= Valencia (Corts Valencianes constituency) =

Coordinates: 39°20′N 0°50′W

- Corts Valencianes; Electoral constituency
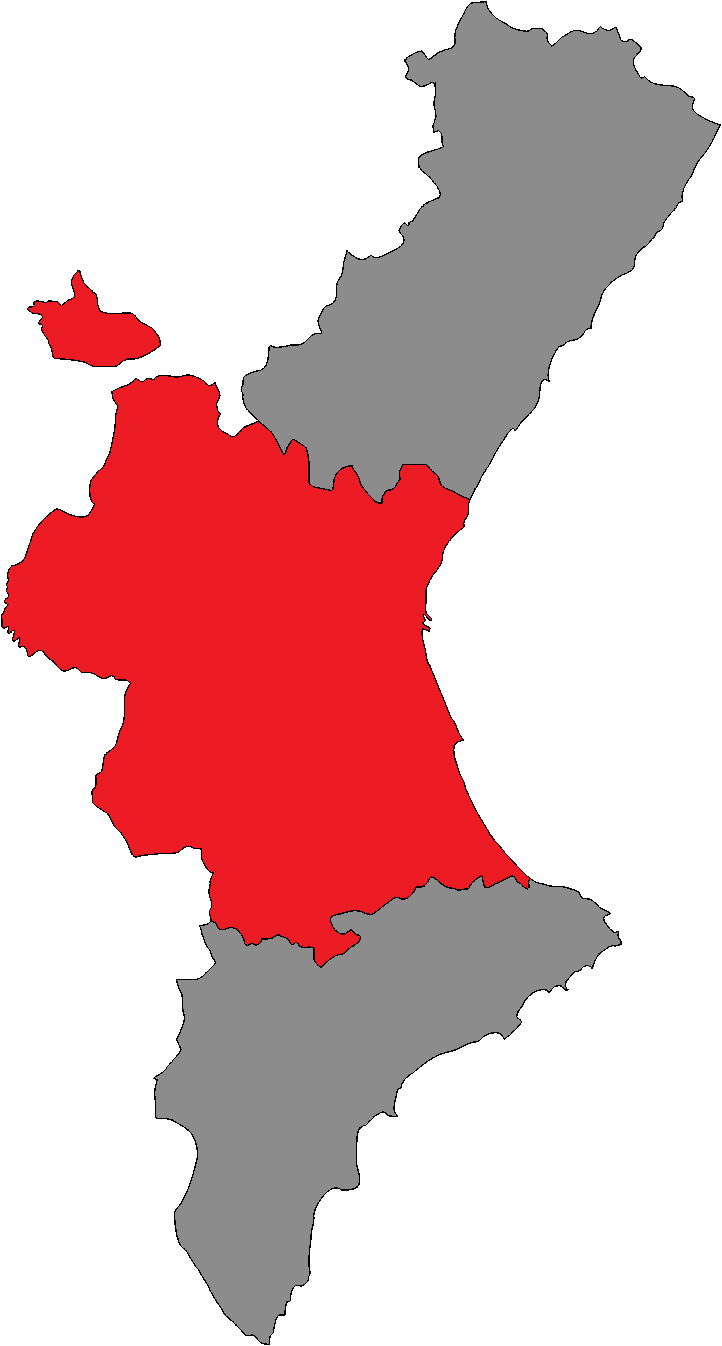
- Location of Valencia within the Valencian Community
- Province: Valencia
- Autonomous community: Valencian Community
- Population: ▲2,709,433 (2024)
- Electorate: ▲1,995,970 (2023)
- Major settlements: Valencia, Torrent, Gandía, Paterna, Sagunto

Current constituency
- Created: 1983
- Seats: 35 (1983–1987); 37 (1987–2003); 36 (2003–2007); 40 (2007–present)
- Members: PP (15); PSPV (12); Compromís (8); Vox (5)

Valencia (Catalan: València) is one of the three constituencies (Spanish: circunscripciones) represented in the Corts Valencianes, the regional legislature of the Valencian Community. The constituency currently elects 40 deputies. Its boundaries correspond to those of the Spanish province of Valencia. The electoral system uses the D'Hondt method and closed-list proportional representation, with a minimum threshold of five percent regionally.

== Electoral system ==
The constituency was created as per the Statute of Autonomy of the Valencian Community of 1982 and was first contested in the 1983 regional election. The Statute provided for the three provinces in the Valencian Community—Alicante, Castellón and Valencia—to be established as multi-member districts in the Corts Valencianes, with this regulation being maintained under the 1987 regional electoral law. Each constituency is entitled to an initial minimum of 20 seats, with the remaining 39—29 until 2007—being distributed in proportion to their populations (provided that the seat-to-population ratio in any given province did not exceed three times that of any other). The exception was the 1983 election, when each constituency was allocated a fixed number of seats: 29 for Alicante, 25 for Castellón and 35 for Valencia.

Voting is on the basis of universal suffrage, which comprises all nationals over eighteen, registered in the Valencian Community and in full enjoyment of their political rights. Amendments to the electoral law in 2011 required for Valencians abroad to apply for voting before being permitted to vote, a system known as "begged" or expat vote (Spanish: Voto rogado) which was abolished in 2022. Seats are elected using the D'Hondt method and a closed list proportional representation, with a threshold of five percent of valid votes—which includes blank ballots—being applied regionally. Parties not reaching the threshold are not taken into consideration for seat distribution.

The electoral law allows for parties and federations registered in the interior ministry, coalitions and groupings of electors to present lists of candidates. Parties and federations intending to form a coalition ahead of an election are required to inform the relevant Electoral Commission within ten days of the election call—fifteen before 1985—whereas groupings of electors need to secure the signature of at least one percent of the electorate in the constituencies for which they seek election—one-thousandth of the electorate, with a compulsory minimum of 500 signatures, until 1985—disallowing electors from signing for more than one list of candidates.

== Deputies ==
Deputies 1983–present
Key to parties PCE–PCPV EUPV IU–UPV CPV Unides Podem Podemos/Podem Compromís PSPV–PSOE CDS Cs UV PP CP AP Vox
Corts	Election	Distribution
1st	1983	3 / 20 / 12
2nd	1987	3 / 17 / 3 / 6 / 8
3rd	1991	3 / 18 / 6 / 10
4th	1995	5 / 12 / 4 / 16
5th	1999	2 / 14 / 21
6th	2003	3 / 14 / 19
7th	2007	3 / 14 / 23
8th	2011	2 / 4 / 12 / 22
9th	2015	5 / 10 / 8 / 5 / 12
10th	2019	3 / 9 / 10 / 7 / 7 / 4
11th	2023	8 / 12 / 15 / 5

== Regional elections ==
=== 2023 ===
Summary of the 28 May 2023 Corts Valencianes election results in Valencia
Parties and alliances	Popular vote			Seats	
Parties and alliances	Votes	%	±pp	Total	+/−
People's Party (PP)	457,889	33.59	+15.58	15	+8
Socialist Party of the Valencian Country (PSPV–PSOE)	380,331	27.90	+5.27	12	+2
Commitment: Més–Initiative–Greens Equo (Compromís)	237,286	17.40	–3.34	8	–1
Vox (Vox)	172,078	12.62	+2.44	5	+1
United We Can–United Left (Unides Podem–EUPV)	50,284	3.69	–3.75	0	–3
Citizens–Party of the Citizenry (CS)	20,559	1.51	–15.83	0	–7
Animalist Party with the Environment (PACMA)^{1}	13,079	0.96	–0.47	0	±0
United Coalition (Units)	2,769	0.20	New	0	±0
Republican Left of the Valencian Country (ERPV)	2,356	0.17	±0.00	0	±0
Blank Seats to Leave Empty Seats (EB)	2,090	0.15	New	0	±0
Decide (Decidix)	1,763	0.13	New	0	±0
Communist Party of the Peoples of Spain (PCPE)	1,716	0.13	–0.02	0	±0
Zero Cuts (Recortes Cero)	1,620	0.12	New	0	±0
For a Fairer World (PUM+J)	1,373	0.10	New	0	±0
Valencian Republic–European Valencianist Party (RV–PVE)	941	0.07	–0.01	0	±0
Alliance for the Commerce and Housing (AlianzaCV)	811	0.06	New	0	±0
Blank ballots	16,398	1.20	+0.49		
Total	1,363,343			40	±0
Valid votes	1,363,343	98.85	+0.25		
Invalid votes	15,916	1.15	–0.25		
Votes cast / turnout	1,379,259	69.10	–5.35		
Abstentions	616,711	30.90	+5.35		
Registered voters	1,995,970				
Sources
Footnotes: ^{1} Animalist Party with the Environment results are compared to Animalist Party Against Mistreatment of Animals totals in the 2019 election.

=== 2019 ===
Summary of the 28 April 2019 Corts Valencianes election results in Valencia
Parties and alliances	Popular vote			Seats	
Parties and alliances	Votes	%	±pp	Total	+/−
Socialist Party of the Valencian Country (PSPV–PSOE)	326,663	22.63	+4.04	10	+2
Commitment: Bloc–Initiative–Greens Equo (Compromís)	299,404	20.74	–2.11	9	–1
People's Party (PP)	259,934	18.01	–7.31	7	–5
Citizens–Party of the Citizenry (Cs)	250,267	17.34	+5.53	7	+2
Vox (Vox)	146,908	10.18	+9.72	4	+4
United We Can–United Left (Unides Podem–EUPV)^{1}	107,397	7.44	–8.02	3	–2
Animalist Party Against Mistreatment of Animals (PACMA)	20,572	1.43	+0.65	0	±0
We Are Valencian in Movement (UiG–Som–CUIDES)	7,102	0.49	+0.02	0	±0
Forward–The Eco-pacifist Greens (Avant/Adelante–LVEP)	3,840	0.27	+0.17	0	±0
Democratic People (Poble)	2,503	0.17	+0.01	0	±0
Republican Left of the Valencian Country (ERPV)	2,501	0.17	New	0	±0
Communist Party of the Peoples of Spain (PCPE)	2,176	0.15	+0.07	0	±0
Valencian Republic–European Valencianist Party (RV–PVE)	1,179	0.08	New	0	±0
Spanish Phalanx of the CNSO (FE–JONS)	1,007	0.07	–0.04	0	±0
At Once Valencian Community (aUna CV)	981	0.07	New	0	±0
Blank ballots	10,228	0.71	–0.55		
Total	1,443,353			40	±0
Valid votes	1,443,353	98.60	–0.11		
Invalid votes	20,509	1.40	+0.11		
Votes cast / turnout	1,463,862	74.45	+2.91		
Abstentions	502,361	25.55	–2.91		
Registered voters	1,966,223				
Sources
Footnotes: ^{1} United We Can–United Left results are compared to the combined totals of We Can and Citizen Agreement in the 2015 election.

=== 2015 ===
Summary of the 24 May 2015 Corts Valencianes election results in Valencia
Parties and alliances	Popular vote			Seats	
Parties and alliances	Votes	%	±pp	Total	+/−
People's Party (PP)	347,541	25.32	–24.25	12	–10
Commitment Coalition: Bloc–Initiative–Greens (Compromís)	313,745	22.85	+13.98	10	+6
Socialist Party of the Valencian Country (PSPV–PSOE)	255,239	18.59	–7.72	8	–4
Citizens–Party of the Citizenry (C's)	162,123	11.81	New	5	+5
We Can (Podemos/Podem)	149,917	10.92	New	5	+5
Citizen Agreement (EUPV–EV–ERPV–AS)^{1}	62,386	4.54	–3.24	0	–2
Union, Progress and Democracy (UPyD)	14,474	1.05	–1.18	0	±0
Animalist Party Against Mistreatment of Animals (PACMA)	10,758	0.78	+0.42	0	±0
Let's Win Valencian Country (Ganemos)	8,079	0.59	New	0	±0
We Are Valencian (SOMVAL)	6,392	0.47	New	0	±0
Vox (Vox)	6,363	0.46	New	0	±0
Spain 2000 (E–2000)	4,941	0.36	–0.21	0	±0
Democratic People (Poble)	2,210	0.16	New	0	±0
Blank Seats (Eb)	1,806	0.13	New	0	±0
Spanish Phalanx of the CNSO (FE–JONS)	1,528	0.11	+0.02	0	±0
United for Valencia (UxV)	1,438	0.10	–0.12	0	±0
Zero Cuts (Recortes Cero)	1,400	0.10	New	0	±0
Forward (Avant)	1,322	0.10	New	0	±0
Communist Party of the Peoples of Spain (PCPE)	1,151	0.08	–0.03	0	±0
Together (Junts)^{2}	646	0.05	±0.00	0	±0
Libertarian Party (P–LIB)	622	0.05	New	0	±0
Republican Social Movement (MSR)	603	0.04	New	0	±0
Democratic Forum (FDEE)	423	0.03	New	0	±0
The National Coalition (LCN)	413	0.03	New	0	±0
Blank ballots	17,259	1.26	–1.08		
Total	1,372,779			40	±0
Valid votes	1,372,779	98.71	+0.22		
Invalid votes	17,991	1.29	–0.22		
Votes cast / turnout	1,390,770	71.54	+0.02		
Abstentions	553,141	28.46	–0.02		
Registered voters	1,943,911				
Sources
Footnotes: ^{1} Citizen Agreement results are compared to the combined totals of United Left of the Valencian Country, Greens and Eco-pacifists and Republican Left of the Valencian Country in the 2011 election.; ^{2} Together results are compared to Valencian Nationalist Left–European Valencianist Party totals in the 2011 election.

=== 2011 ===
Summary of the 22 May 2011 Corts Valencianes election results in Valencia
Parties and alliances	Popular vote			Seats	
Parties and alliances	Votes	%	±pp	Total	+/−
People's Party (PP)	669,454	49.57	–4.06	22	–1
Socialist Party of the Valencian Country (PSPV–PSOE)	355,341	26.31	–6.20	12	–2
Bloc–Initiative–Greens: Commitment Coalition (Compromís)^{1}	119,797	8.87	n/a	4	+3
United Left of the Valencian Country (EUPV)^{1}	86,143	6.38	n/a	2	±0
Union, Progress and Democracy (UPyD)	30,124	2.23	New	0	±0
Greens and Eco-pacifists (VyE)	13,492	1.00	New	0	±0
Spain 2000 (E–2000)	7,683	0.57	+0.33	0	±0
Valencian Coalition (CVa)	7,060	0.52	–0.55	0	±0
Republican Left of the Valencian Country (ERPV)	5,415	0.40	–0.06	0	±0
Anti-Bullfighting Party Against Mistreatment of Animals (PACMA)	4,838	0.36	New	0	±0
Citizens for Blank Votes (CenB)	4,222	0.31	New	0	±0
Liberal Democratic Centre (CDL)	3,119	0.23	New	0	±0
United for Valencia (UxV)	3,019	0.22	+0.10	0	±0
Communist Party of the Peoples of Spain (PCPE)	1,432	0.11	–0.06	0	±0
Humanist Party (PH)	1,190	0.09	+0.01	0	±0
Spanish Falange of the JONS (FE-JONS)	1,156	0.09	+0.04	0	±0
National Democracy (DN)	915	0.07	+0.02	0	±0
Communist Unification of Spain (UCE)	886	0.07	New	0	±0
The Republic (La República)	735	0.05	New	0	±0
Valencian Nationalist Left–European Valencianist Party (ENV–RV–PVE)	677	0.05	New	0	±0
Spanish Patriotic Social Party (SPES)	585	0.04	New	0	±0
Movement for People's Unity–Republicans (MUP–R)	529	0.04	–0.02	0	±0
Foreigners' Party (PdEx)	508	0.04	New	0	±0
Authentic Phalanx (FA)	456	0.03	–0.05	0	±0
Blank ballots	31,664	2.34	+0.99		
Total	1,350,440			40	±0
Valid votes	1,350,440	98.49	–0.94		
Invalid votes	20,743	1.51	+0.94		
Votes cast / turnout	1,371,183	71.52	+0.15		
Abstentions	546,086	28.48	–0.15		
Registered voters	1,917,269				
Sources
Footnotes: ^{1} Within the Commitment for the Valencian Country alliance in the 2007 election.

=== 2007 ===
Summary of the 27 May 2007 Corts Valencianes election results in Valencia
Parties and alliances	Popular vote			Seats	
Parties and alliances	Votes	%	±pp	Total	+/−
People's Party (PP)	721,460	53.63	+7.35	23	+4
Socialist Party of the Valencian Country (PSPV–PSOE)	437,261	32.51	–2.61	14	±0
Commitment for the Valencian Country (Compromís PV)^{1}	118,650	8.82	–3.13	3	±0
Valencian Coalition (CVa)	14,376	1.07	New	0	±0
Valencian Union–The Eco-pacifist Greens (UV–LVEP)	12,675	0.94	–2.96	0	±0
Republican Left of the Valencian Country (ERPV)	6,176	0.46	+0.15	0	±0
Social Democratic Party (PSD)	4,468	0.33	New	0	±0
Spain 2000 (E–2000)	3,205	0.24	+0.11	0	±0
Communist Party of the Peoples of Spain (PCPE)	2,300	0.17	+0.03	0	±0
United for Valencia (UxV)	1,617	0.12	New	0	±0
Humanist Party (PH)	1,143	0.08	±0.00	0	±0
Authentic Phalanx (FA)	1,046	0.08	+0.01	0	±0
Movement for People's Unity–Republicans (MUP–R)	751	0.06	New	0	±0
National Democracy (DN)	706	0.05	New	0	±0
Spanish Falange of the JONS (FE-JONS)	698	0.05	New	0	±0
Liberal Centrist Union (UCL)	427	0.03	New	0	±0
Blank ballots	18,198	1.35	–0.15		
Total	1,345,157			40	+4
Valid votes	1,345,157	99.43	+0.01		
Invalid votes	7,683	0.57	–0.01		
Votes cast / turnout	1,352,840	71.37	–0.93		
Abstentions	542,821	28.63	+0.93		
Registered voters	1,895,661				
Sources
Footnotes: ^{1} Commitment for the Valencian Country results are compared to the combined totals of United Left–The Greens–Valencian Left: Agreement and Valencian Nationalist Bloc–Green Left in the 2003 election.

=== 2003 ===
Summary of the 25 May 2003 Corts Valencianes election results in Valencia
Parties and alliances	Popular vote			Seats	
Parties and alliances	Votes	%	±pp	Total	+/−
People's Party (PP)	624,253	46.28	–0.81	19	–2
Socialist Party of the Valencian Country (PSPV–PSOE)	473,757	35.12	+2.57	14	±0
United Left–The Greens–Valencian Left: The Agreement (L'Entesa)	94,956	7.04	+0.59	3	+1
Valencian Nationalist Bloc–Green Left (Bloc–EV)	66,282	4.91	+0.04	0	±0
Union–Valencian Union (UV)	52,625	3.90	–2.57	0	±0
Republican Left of the Valencian Country (ERPV)	4,169	0.31	New	0	±0
Communist Party of the Peoples of Spain (PCPE)	1,922	0.14	New	0	±0
Spain 2000 (E–2000)	1,697	0.13	New	0	±0
Family and Life Party (PFyV)	1,690	0.13	New	0	±0
Regional Party of the Valencian Community (PRCV)	1,604	0.12	New	0	±0
Democratic and Social Centre (CDS)	1,295	0.10	–0.03	0	±0
Federal Republican Party (PRF)	1,279	0.09	+0.02	0	±0
Another Democracy is Possible (ODeP)	1,156	0.09	New	0	±0
Humanist Party (PH)	1,061	0.08	±0.00	0	±0
Authentic Phalanx (FA)	973	0.07	New	0	±0
Blank ballots	20,247	1.50	+0.03		
Total	1,348,966			36	–1
Valid votes	1,348,966	99.42	–0.08		
Invalid votes	7,820	0.58	+0.08		
Votes cast / turnout	1,356,786	72.30	+4.95		
Abstentions	519,901	27.70	–4.95		
Registered voters	1,876,687				

=== 1999 ===
Summary of the 13 June 1999 Corts Valencianes election results in Valencia
Parties and alliances	Popular vote			Seats	
Parties and alliances	Votes	%	±pp	Total	+/−
People's Party (PP)	594,896	47.09	+7.01	21	+5
Spanish Socialist Workers' Party–Progressives (PSOE–p)	411,194	32.55	+0.02	14	+2
Valencian Union (UV)	81,681	6.47	–3.87	0	–4
United Left of the Valencian Country (EUPV)	81,443	6.45	–6.12	2	–3
Valencian Nationalist Bloc–The Greens (BNV–EV)^{1}	61,503	4.87	+2.27	0	±0
Valencian Community Alternative (ACV)	6,146	0.49	New	0	±0
Centrist Union–Democratic and Social Centre (UC–CDS)	1,641	0.13	–0.20	0	±0
Valencian Independent Organization (OIV)	1,316	0.10	New	0	±0
Spanish Phalanx of the CNSO (FE–JONS)	1,175	0.09	+0.04	0	±0
Valencian Nationalist Left (ENV)	1,103	0.09	+0.02	0	±0
Humanist Party (PH)	1,020	0.08	New	0	±0
Federal Republican Left–Federal Republican Party (IRF–PRF)	939	0.07	New	0	±0
Spanish Autonomous League (LAE)	608	0.05	+0.01	0	±0
Blank ballots	18,591	1.47	+0.45		
Total	1,263,256			37	±0
Valid votes	1,263,256	99.50	+0.01		
Invalid votes	6,383	0.50	–0.01		
Votes cast / turnout	1,269,639	67.35	–9.10		
Abstentions	615,427	32.65	+9.10		
Registered voters	1,885,066				
Sources
Footnotes: ^{1} Valencian Nationalist Bloc–The Greens results are compared to Valencian People's Union–Nationalist Bloc totals in the 1995 election.

=== 1995 ===
Summary of the 28 May 1995 Corts Valencianes election results in Valencia
Parties and alliances	Popular vote			Seats	
Parties and alliances	Votes	%	±pp	Total	+/−
People's Party (PP)	534,753	40.08	+16.81	16	+6
Spanish Socialist Workers' Party (PSOE)	434,059	32.53	–9.65	12	–6
United Left–The Greens (EU–EV)^{1}	167,669	12.57	+2.44	5	+2
Valencian Union–Independents–Centrists (UV–FICVA–CCV)	138,032	10.34	–5.94	4	–2
Valencian People's Union–Nationalist Bloc (UPV–BN)	34,635	2.60	–1.27	0	±0
Democratic and Social Centre (CDS)	4,405	0.33	–2.15	0	±0
Communist Party of the Peoples of Spain (PCPE)	1,613	0.12	+0.01	0	±0
Autonomist Republican Party (PRA)	1,139	0.09	New	0	±0
Platform of Independents of Spain (PIE)	1,085	0.08	New	0	±0
Valencian Nationalist Left (ENV)^{2}	943	0.07	–0.13	0	±0
Humanist Platform (PH–LE)	773	0.06	New	0	±0
Spanish Phalanx of the CNSO (FE–JONS)	670	0.05	New	0	±0
Spanish Autonomous League (LAE)	542	0.04	New	0	±0
United Alicante (AU)	448	0.03	New	0	±0
Blank ballots	13,604	1.02	+0.02		
Total	1,334,370			37	±0
Valid votes	1,334,370	99.49	±0.00		
Invalid votes	6,892	0.51	±0.00		
Votes cast / turnout	1,341,262	76.45	+7.10		
Abstentions	413,209	23.55	–7.10		
Registered voters	1,754,471				
Sources
Footnotes: ^{1} United Left–The Greens results are compared to the combined totals of United Left of the Valencian Country and The Greens in the 1991 election.; ^{2} Valencian Nationalist Left results are compared to Valencian Nationalist Union totals in the 1991 election.

=== 1991 ===
Summary of the 26 May 1991 Corts Valencianes election results in Valencia
Parties and alliances	Popular vote			Seats	
Parties and alliances	Votes	%	±pp	Total	+/−
Spanish Socialist Workers' Party (PSOE)	477,766	42.18	+1.55	18	+1
People's Party (PP)^{1}	263,550	23.27	+3.09	10	+2
Valencian Union (UV)	184,379	16.28	+1.33	6	±0
United Left of the Valencian Country (EUPV)^{2}	93,820	8.28	n/a	3	±0
Valencian People's Union (UPV)^{2}	43,891	3.87	n/a	0	±0
Democratic and Social Centre (CDS)	28,043	2.48	–7.03	0	–3
The Greens (LV)	20,959	1.85	+1.07	0	±0
Valencian Nationalist Union (UNV)^{3}	2,248	0.20	–0.05	0	±0
National Front (FN)	2,184	0.19	New	0	±0
Socialist Democracy (DS)	1,848	0.16	New	0	±0
Left Platform (PCE (m–l)–CRPE)^{4}	1,207	0.11	–0.03	0	±0
Alliance for the Republic (AxR)^{5}	1,005	0.09	–0.04	0	±0
Cantonalist Party of the Alicantine Country (Alicantón)	469	0.04	New	0	±0
Blank ballots	11,332	1.00	+0.02		
Total	1,132,701			37	±0
Valid votes	1,132,701	99.49	+0.63		
Invalid votes	5,811	0.51	–0.63		
Votes cast / turnout	1,138,512	69.35	–5.71		
Abstentions	503,102	30.65	+5.71		
Registered voters	1,641,614				
Sources
Footnotes: ^{1} People's Party results are compared to the combined totals of People's Alliance and People's Democratic Party–Valencian Centrists in the 1987 election.; ^{2} Within the United Left–Valencian People's Union alliance in the 1987 election.; ^{3} Valencian Nationalist Union results are compared to Valencian Nationalist Left totals in the 1987 election.; ^{4} Left Platform results are compared to Republican Popular Unity totals in the 1987 election.; ^{5} Alliance for the Republic results are compared to Internationalist Socialist Workers' Party totals in the 1987 election.

=== 1987 ===
Summary of the 10 June 1987 Corts Valencianes election results in Valencia
Parties and alliances	Popular vote			Seats	
Parties and alliances	Votes	%	±pp	Total	+/−
Spanish Socialist Workers' Party (PSOE)	464,470	40.63	–9.58	17	–3
People's Alliance (AP)^{1}	227,144	19.87	n/a	8	±0
Valencian Union (UV)^{1}	170,866	14.95	n/a	6	+4
Democratic and Social Centre (CDS)	108,718	9.51	+7.89	3	+3
United Left–Valencian People's Union (IU–UPV)^{2}	104,050	9.10	–2.66	3	±0
Workers' Party of Spain–Communist Unity (PTE–UC)	19,507	1.71	New	0	±0
The Greens (LV)	8,964	0.78	New	0	±0
Valencian Electoral Coalition (CEV)	7,217	0.63	New	0	±0
Spanish Vertex Ecological Development Revindication (VERDE)	5,056	0.44	New	0	±0
People's Democratic Party–Valencian Centrists (PDP–CV)^{1}	3,507	0.31	n/a	0	–1
Valencian Nationalist Left (ENV–URV)	2,803	0.25	–0.44	0	±0
Left Front (FI)	2,295	0.20	New	0	±0
Communist Unification of Spain (UCE)	2,287	0.20	New	0	±0
Humanist Platform (PH)	2,043	0.18	New	0	±0
Republican Popular Unity (UPR)^{3}	1,651	0.14	+0.02	0	±0
Internationalist Socialist Workers' Party (POSI)	1,448	0.13	New	0	±0
Liberal Party (PL)^{1}	n/a	n/a	n/a	0	–1
Blank ballots	11,216	0.98	+0.29		
Total	1,143,242			37	+2
Valid votes	1,143,242	98.86	–0.03		
Invalid votes	13,144	1.14	+0.03		
Votes cast / turnout	1,156,386	75.06	+1.67		
Abstentions	384,235	24.94	–1.67		
Registered voters	1,540,621				
Sources
Footnotes: ^{1} Within the People's Coalition–Valencian Union alliance in the 1983 election.; ^{2} United Left–Valencian People's Union results are compared to the combined totals of Communist Party of the Valencian Country and Valencian People's Union in the 1983 election.; ^{3} Republican Popular Unity results are compared to Popular Struggle Coalition totals in the 1983 election.

=== 1983 ===
Summary of the 8 May 1983 Corts Valencianes election results in Valencia
Parties and alliances	Popular vote			Seats	
Parties and alliances	Votes	%	±pp	Total	+/−
Spanish Socialist Workers' Party (PSOE)	552,146	50.21	n/a	20	n/a
People's Coalition–Valencian Union (AP–PDP–UL–UV)	349,981	31.82	n/a	12	n/a
Communist Party of the Valencian Country (PCE–PCPV)	91,149	8.29	n/a	3	n/a
Valencian People's Union (UPV)	38,142	3.47	n/a	0	n/a
Democratic and Social Centre (CDS)	17,798	1.62	n/a	0	n/a
Valencian Independent Organization (OIV)	12,585	1.14	n/a	0	n/a
Liberal Democratic Party (PDL)	9,171	0.83	n/a	0	n/a
Valencian Nationalist Left (ENV–URV)	7,623	0.69	n/a	0	n/a
Workers' Socialist Party (PST)	6,271	0.57	n/a	0	n/a
Spanish Communist Workers' Party (PCOE)	5,945	0.54	n/a	0	n/a
Popular Struggle Coalition (CLP)	1,350	0.12	n/a	0	n/a
Blank ballots	7,586	0.69	n/a		
Total	1,099,747			35	n/a
Valid votes	1,099,747	98.89	n/a		
Invalid votes	12,327	1.11	n/a		
Votes cast / turnout	1,112,074	73.39	n/a		
Abstentions	403,296	26.61	n/a		
Registered voters	1,515,370				
