= Castellón (Congress of Deputies constituency) =

Electoral constituency in Spain

Coordinates: 40°10′N 0°10′W

- Congress of Deputies; Electoral constituency
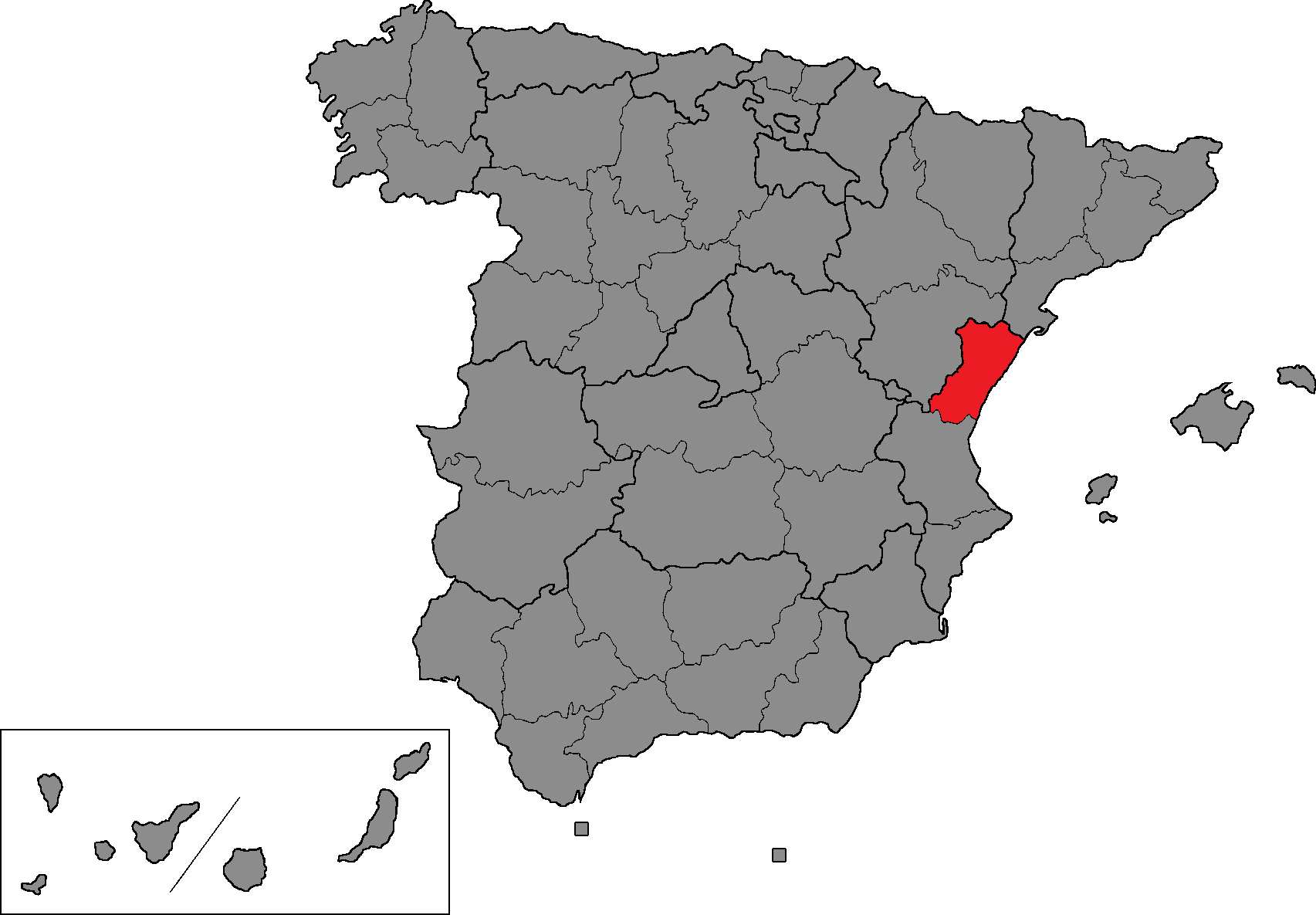
- Location of Castellón within Spain
- Province: Castellón
- Autonomous community: Valencian Community
- Population: ▲615,849 (2024)
- Electorate: ▲430,830 (2023)
- Major settlements: Castellón de la Plana, Villarreal

Current constituency
- Created: 1977
- Seats: 5
- Members: PP (2); PSOE (2); Vox (1)

Castellón (Valencian: Castelló) is one of the 52 constituencies represented in the Congress of Deputies, the lower chamber of the Spanish parliament, the Cortes Generales. The constituency (whose boundaries correspond to those of the homonymous province) currently elects five deputies. The electoral system uses the D'Hondt method and closed-list proportional voting, with a minimum threshold of three percent.

== Electoral system ==
The constituency was created as per the Political Reform Law and was first contested in the 1977 general election. The Law provided for the provinces of Spain to be established as multi-member districts in the Congress of Deputies, with this regulation being maintained under the Spanish Constitution of 1978. Additionally, the Constitution requires for any modification of the provincial limits to be approved under an organic law, needing an absolute majority in the Cortes Generales.

Voting is based on universal suffrage, comprising all Spanish nationals over 18 years of age with full political rights, provided that they have not been deprived of the right to vote by a final sentence. The only exception was in 1977, when this was limited to nationals over 21 years of age and in full enjoyment of their political and civil rights. Amendments in 2011 required non-resident citizens to apply for voting, a system known as "begged" voting (Spanish: Voto rogado). which was abolished in 2022. Further, amendments in 2018 granted the right to vote to those legally incapacitated. The Congress of Deputies has a minimum of 300 and a maximum of 400 seats, with electoral provisions fixing its size at 350. Of these, 348 are elected in 50 multi-member constituencies corresponding to the provinces of Spain—each of which is assigned an initial minimum of two seats and the remaining 248 distributed in proportion to population—using the D'Hondt method and closed-list proportional voting, with a three percent-threshold of valid votes (including blank ballots) in each constituency. The remaining two seats are allocated to Ceuta and Melilla as single-member districts elected by plurality voting. The use of this electoral method may result in a higher effective threshold depending on district magnitude and vote distribution. The law does not provide for by-elections to fill vacant seats; instead, any vacancies arising after the proclamation of candidates and during the legislative term are filled by the next candidates on the party lists or, when required, by designated substitutes.

The electoral law allows for parties and federations registered in the interior ministry, alliances and groupings of electors to present lists of candidates. Parties and federations intending to form an alliance are required to inform the relevant electoral commission within 10 days of the election call—15 before 1985—whereas groupings of electors need to secure the signature of at least one percent of the electorate in the constituencies for which they seek election—one permille of the electorate, with a compulsory minimum of 500 signatures, until 1985—disallowing electors from signing for more than one list. Also since 2011, parties, federations or alliances that have not obtained a mandate in either chamber of the Cortes at the preceding election are required to secure the signature of at least 0.1 percent of electors in the aforementioned constituencies. Amendments in 2007 required a balanced composition of men and women in the electoral lists, so that candidates of either sex made up at least 40 percent of the total composition; further amendments in 2024 required the use of a zipper system.

== Deputies ==
Deputies 1977–present
Key to parties U.Podemos ALV EEM PSOE Cs CIC UCD PP CP AP Vox
Legislature	Election	Distribution
Constituent	1977	2 / 1 / 2
1st	1979	2 / 3
2nd	1982	3 / 2
3rd	1986	3 / 2
4th	1989	3 / 2
5th	1993	2 / 3
6th	1996	2 / 3
7th	2000	2 / 3
8th	2004	2 / 3
9th	2008	2 / 3
10th	2011	2 / 3
11th	2015	1 / 1 / 1 / 2
12th	2016	1 / 1 / 1 / 2
13th	2019 (Apr)	1 / 2 / 1 / 1
14th	2019 (Nov)	1 / 2 / 1 / 1
15th	2023	2 / 2 / 1

== General elections ==
=== 2026 ===
Summary of the 29 November 2026 Congress of Deputies election results in Castellón
Parties and alliances	Popular vote			Seats	
Parties and alliances	Votes	%	±pp	Total	+/−
People's Party (PP)					
Spanish Socialist Workers' Party (PSOE)					
Vox (Vox)					
Commitment: Valencian Front (Compromís–EUPV–Podem–ERPV)^{1}					
Animalist Party with the Environment (PACMA)					
Workers' Front (FO)					
Spanish Phalanx of the CNSO (FE de las JONS)					
Self-employed Party (Partido Autónomos)			New		
The Party is Over (SALF)			New		
Communist Party of the Workers of Spain (PCTE)			New		
Blank ballots					
Total				5	±0
Valid votes					
Invalid votes					
Votes cast / turnout					
Abstentions					
Registered voters	448,196				
Sources
Footnotes: ^{1} Commitment: Valencian Front results are compared to the combined totals of We Unite to Win and Zero Cuts in the 2023 election.

=== 2023 ===
Summary of the 23 July 2023 Congress of Deputies election results in Castellón
Parties and alliances	Popular vote			Seats	
Parties and alliances	Votes	%	±pp	Total	+/−
People's Party (PP)	108,302	35.17	+11.34	2	+1
Spanish Socialist Workers' Party (PSOE)	100,530	32.65	+4.10	2	±0
Vox (Vox)	48,913	15.88	–2.75	1	±0
Commitment–Unite: We Unite to Win (Sumar–Compromís)^{1}	44,187	14.35	–5.14	0	–1
Animalist Party with the Environment (PACMA)^{2}	1,968	0.64	–0.20	0	±0
Workers' Front (FO)	721	0.23	New	0	±0
Zero Cuts (Recortes Cero)	493	0.16	+0.07	0	±0
Spanish Phalanx of the CNSO (FE de las JONS)	161	0.05	±0.00	0	±0
Blank ballots	2,655	0.86	+0.10		
Total	307,930			5	±0
Valid votes	307,930	98.83	–0.15		
Invalid votes	3,651	1.17	+0.15		
Votes cast / turnout	311,581	72.32	+1.61		
Abstentions	119,249	27.68	–1.61		
Registered voters	430,830				
Sources
Footnotes: ^{1} Commitment–Unite: We Unite to Win results are compared to the combined totals of United We Can and More Commitment in the November 2019 election.; ^{2} Animalist Party with the Environment results are compared to Animalist Party Against Mistreatment of Animals totals in the November 2019 election.

=== November 2019 ===
Summary of the 10 November 2019 Congress of Deputies election results in Castellón
Parties and alliances	Popular vote			Seats	
Parties and alliances	Votes	%	±pp	Total	+/−
Spanish Socialist Workers' Party (PSOE)	84,078	28.55	–0.93	2	±0
People's Party (PP)	70,176	23.83	+3.49	1	±0
Vox (Vox)	54,849	18.63	+6.65	1	+1
United We Can (Podemos–EUPV)	39,251	13.33	–0.60	1	±0
Citizens–Party of the Citizenry (Cs)	20,302	6.89	–9.39	0	–1
More Commitment (Més Compromís)^{1}	18,140	6.16	+0.83	0	±0
Animalist Party Against Mistreatment of Animals (PACMA)	2,483	0.84	–0.24	0	±0
Republican Left of the Valencian Country (ERPV)	1,106	0.38	+0.11	0	±0
Forward–The Greens (Avant/Adelante–LV)	405	0.14	–0.05	0	±0
Spanish Communist Workers' Party (PCOE)	379	0.13	New	0	±0
For a Fairer World (PUM+J)	370	0.13	+0.03	0	±0
Zero Cuts–Green Group (Recortes Cero–GV)	257	0.09	–0.02	0	±0
Communist Party of the Peoples of Spain (PCPE)	194	0.07	–0.03	0	±0
Spanish Phalanx of the CNSO (FE de las JONS)	137	0.05	–0.02	0	±0
At Once Valencian Community (aUna CV)	104	0.04	New	0	±0
Blank ballots	2,238	0.76	+0.03		
Total	294,469			5	±0
Valid votes	294,469	98.98	+0.21		
Invalid votes	3,023	1.02	–0.21		
Votes cast / turnout	297,492	70.71	–4.89		
Abstentions	123,249	29.29	+4.89		
Registered voters	420,741				
Sources
Footnotes: ^{1} More Commitment results are compared to Commitment: Bloc–Initiative–Greens Equo totals in the April 2019 election.

=== April 2019 ===
Summary of the 28 April 2019 Congress of Deputies election results in Castellón
Parties and alliances	Popular vote			Seats	
Parties and alliances	Votes	%	±pp	Total	+/−
Spanish Socialist Workers' Party (PSOE)	92,379	29.48	+7.40	2	+1
People's Party (PP)	63,756	20.34	–15.34	1	–1
Citizens–Party of the Citizenry (Cs)	51,017	16.28	+1.53	1	±0
United We Can (Podemos–EUPV)^{1}	43,656	13.93	–10.23	1	±0
Vox (Vox)	37,551	11.98	+11.74	0	±0
Commitment: Bloc–Initiative–Greens Equo (Compromís 2019)	16,713	5.33	New	0	±0
Animalist Party Against Mistreatment of Animals (PACMA)	3,381	1.08	+0.08	0	±0
Republican Left of the Valencian Country (ERPV)	859	0.27	New	0	±0
Forward–The Greens (Avant/Adelante–LV)	586	0.19	New	0	±0
Zero Cuts–Green Group (Recortes Cero–GV)	341	0.11	–0.08	0	±0
Communist Party of the Peoples of Spain (PCPE)	329	0.10	–0.03	0	±0
For a Fairer World (PUM+J)	302	0.10	New	0	±0
Spanish Phalanx of the CNSO (FE de las JONS)	222	0.07	–0.09	0	±0
Blank ballots	2,301	0.73	+0.04		
Total	313,393			5	±0
Valid votes	313,393	98.77	–0.20		
Invalid votes	3,909	1.23	+0.20		
Votes cast / turnout	317,302	75.60	+3.01		
Abstentions	102,412	24.40	–3.01		
Registered voters	419,714				
Sources
Footnotes: ^{1} United We Can results are compared to The Valencian Way totals in the 2016 election.

=== 2016 ===
Summary of the 26 June 2016 Congress of Deputies election results in Castellón
Parties and alliances	Popular vote			Seats	
Parties and alliances	Votes	%	±pp	Total	+/−
People's Party (PP)	106,746	35.68	+3.86	2	±0
The Valencian Way (Podemos–Compromís–EUPV)^{1}	72,281	24.16	–3.09	1	±0
Spanish Socialist Workers' Party (PSOE)	66,062	22.08	+0.56	1	±0
Citizens–Party of the Citizenry (C's)	44,121	14.75	–0.87	1	±0
Animalist Party Against Mistreatment of Animals (PACMA)	2,985	1.00	+0.27	0	±0
Citizens of Democratic Centre (CCD)	1,712	0.57	–0.12	0	±0
Vox (Vox)	711	0.24	–0.06	0	±0
Union, Progress and Democracy (UPyD)	662	0.22	–0.34	0	±0
Zero Cuts–Green Group (Recortes Cero–GV)	561	0.19	+0.03	0	±0
Spanish Phalanx of the CNSO (FE de las JONS)	476	0.16	New	0	±0
We Are Valencian (SOMVAL)	415	0.14	–0.01	0	±0
Communist Party of the Peoples of Spain (PCPE)	403	0.13	–0.03	0	±0
Blank ballots	2,069	0.69	+0.01		
Total	299,204			5	±0
Valid votes	299,204	98.97	+0.03		
Invalid votes	3,120	1.03	–0.03		
Votes cast / turnout	302,324	72.59	–2.39		
Abstentions	114,167	27.41	+2.39		
Registered voters	416,491				
Sources
Footnotes: ^{1} The Valencian Way results are compared to the combined totals of It is Time and United Left of the Valencian Country–Popular Unity in Common in the 2015 election.

=== 2015 ===
Summary of the 20 December 2015 Congress of Deputies election results in Castellón
Parties and alliances	Popular vote			Seats	
Parties and alliances	Votes	%	±pp	Total	+/−
People's Party (PP)	98,474	31.82	–21.02	2	–1
It is Time (Podemos–Compromís)^{1}	74,732	24.15	+20.14	1	+1
Spanish Socialist Workers' Party (PSOE)	66,590	21.52	–8.04	1	–1
Citizens–Party of the Citizenry (C's)	48,328	15.62	New	1	+1
United Left of the Valencian Country–Popular Unity in Common (EUPV–UPeC)	9,605	3.10	–2.19	0	±0
Animalist Party Against Mistreatment of Animals (PACMA)	2,252	0.73	+0.32	0	±0
Citizens of Democratic Centre (CCD)	2,137	0.69	New	0	±0
Union, Progress and Democracy (UPyD)	1,743	0.56	–3.49	0	±0
Vox (Vox)	921	0.30	New	0	±0
Communist Party of the Peoples of Spain (PCPE)	509	0.16	–0.03	0	±0
Zero Cuts–Green Group (Recortes Cero–GV)	489	0.16	New	0	±0
National Democracy (DN)	471	0.15	New	0	±0
We Are Valencian (SOMVAL)	467	0.15	New	0	±0
Valencian Country Now (Ara PV)^{2}	413	0.13	–0.38	0	±0
Feminist Initiative (IFem)	261	0.08	New	0	±0
Blank ballots	2,093	0.68	–0.72		
Total	309,485			5	±0
Valid votes	309,485	98.94	+0.61		
Invalid votes	3,330	1.06	–0.61		
Votes cast / turnout	312,815	74.98	+2.24		
Abstentions	104,382	25.02	–2.24		
Registered voters	417,197				
Sources
Footnotes: ^{1} It is Time results are compared to Commitment Coalition–Equo totals in the 2011 election.; ^{2} Valencian Country Now results are compared to Republican Left of the Valencian Country totals in the 2011 election.

=== 2011 ===
Summary of the 20 November 2011 Congress of Deputies election results in Castellón
Parties and alliances	Popular vote			Seats	
Parties and alliances	Votes	%	±pp	Total	+/−
People's Party (PP)	156,683	52.84	+3.86	3	±0
Spanish Socialist Workers' Party (PSOE)	87,657	29.56	–14.62	2	±0
United Left of the Valencian Country–The Greens: Plural Left (EUPV–EV)	15,692	5.29	+3.20	0	±0
Union, Progress and Democracy (UPyD)	12,008	4.05	+3.49	0	±0
Bloc–Initiative–Greens–Equo: Commitment Coalition (Compromís–Q)^{1}	11,890	4.01	+3.00	0	±0
Spain 2000 (E–2000)	3,687	1.24	+0.91	0	±0
Republican Left of the Valencian Country (ERPV)	1,501	0.51	+0.17	0	±0
Animalist Party Against Mistreatment of Animals (PACMA)	1,223	0.41	+0.24	0	±0
Pirate Party (Pirata)	1,001	0.34	New	0	±0
Communist Party of the Peoples of Spain (PCPE)	563	0.19	+0.13	0	±0
Internationalist Socialist Workers' Party (POSI)	284	0.10	+0.07	0	±0
Communist Unification of Spain (UCE)	180	0.06	New	0	±0
Blank ballots	4,146	1.40	+0.32		
Total	296,515			5	±0
Valid votes	296,515	98.33	–0.93		
Invalid votes	5,033	1.67	+0.93		
Votes cast / turnout	301,548	72.74	–5.09		
Abstentions	113,013	27.26	+5.09		
Registered voters	414,561				
Sources
Footnotes: ^{1} Bloc–Initiative–Greens–Equo: Commitment Coalition results are compared to Bloc–Initiative–Greens totals in the 2008 election.

=== 2008 ===
Summary of the 9 March 2008 Congress of Deputies election results in Castellón
Parties and alliances	Popular vote			Seats	
Parties and alliances	Votes	%	±pp	Total	+/−
People's Party (PP)	155,549	48.98	+3.34	3	±0
Spanish Socialist Workers' Party (PSOE)	140,304	44.18	–0.42	2	±0
United and Republican Left (EUPV–IR)	6,635	2.09	–1.22	0	±0
Bloc–Initiative–Greens (Bloc–IdPV–EVEE)	3,223	1.01	–1.02	0	±0
Union, Progress and Democracy (UPyD)	1,790	0.56	New	0	±0
Republican Left of the Valencian Country (esquerra–PV)	1,082	0.34	–0.37	0	±0
Spain 2000 (E–2000)	1,054	0.33	+0.11	0	±0
The Greens (EV–LV)^{1}	750	0.24	–0.45	0	±0
The Greens–Green Group (LV–GV)	553	0.17	New	0	±0
Anti-Bullfighting Party Against Mistreatment of Animals (PACMA)	544	0.17	New	0	±0
Social Democratic Party (PSD)	426	0.13	New	0	±0
Citizens–Party of the Citizenry (C's)	294	0.09	New	0	±0
For a Fairer World (PUM+J)	229	0.07	New	0	±0
Valencian Coalition (CVa)	213	0.07	New	0	±0
National Democracy (DN)	209	0.07	±0.00	0	±0
Communist Party of the Peoples of Spain (PCPE)	203	0.06	–0.02	0	±0
Spanish Phalanx of the CNSO (FE de las JONS)	196	0.06	–0.01	0	±0
Valencian Nationalist Option (ONV)	183	0.06	New	0	±0
Family and Life Party (PFyV)	124	0.04	–0.08	0	±0
Internationalist Socialist Workers' Party (POSI)	93	0.03	–0.06	0	±0
Humanist Party (PH)	78	0.02	–0.07	0	±0
For the Valencian Republic (plRV)	76	0.02	New	0	±0
Authentic Phalanx (FA)	72	0.02	–0.04	0	±0
Spanish Alternative (AES)	72	0.02	New	0	±0
Carlist Traditionalist Communion (CTC)	70	0.02	New	0	±0
Kingdom of Valencia Identity (IRV)	62	0.02	New	0	±0
National Alliance (AN)	60	0.02	New	0	±0
Centrist Party (PCTR)	36	0.01	New	0	±0
Blank ballots	3,416	1.08	–0.53		
Total	317,596			5	±0
Valid votes	317,596	99.26	+0.12		
Invalid votes	2,362	0.74	–0.12		
Votes cast / turnout	319,958	77.83	–0.58		
Abstentions	91,123	22.17	+0.58		
Registered voters	411,081				
Sources
Footnotes: ^{1} The Greens results are compared to The Eco-pacifist Greens totals in the 2004 election.

=== 2004 ===
Summary of the 14 March 2004 Congress of Deputies election results in Castellón
Parties and alliances	Popular vote			Seats	
Parties and alliances	Votes	%	±pp	Total	+/−
People's Party (PP)	142,462	45.64	–8.15	3	±0
Spanish Socialist Workers' Party (PSOE)	139,236	44.60	+9.25	2	±0
United Left–The Agreement+Republican Left (Entesa+IR)	10,322	3.31	–0.49	0	±0
Valencian Nationalist Bloc–Green Left (Bloc–EV)	6,325	2.03	–0.33	0	±0
Republican Left of the Valencian Country (ERPV)	2,210	0.71	+0.48	0	±0
The Eco-pacifist Greens (LVEP)	2,153	0.69	–0.05	0	±0
Citizens for Blank Votes (CenB)	881	0.28	New	0	±0
Democratic and Social Centre (CDS)	752	0.24	+0.15	0	±0
Spain 2000 (E–2000)	694	0.22	+0.18	0	±0
Family and Life Party (PFyV)	390	0.12	New	0	±0
Humanist Party (PH)	282	0.09	+0.03	0	±0
Internationalist Socialist Workers' Party (POSI)	266	0.09	–0.07	0	±0
Communist Party of the Peoples of Spain (PCPE)	255	0.08	–0.01	0	±0
Spanish Phalanx of the CNSO (FE de las JONS)	211	0.07	New	0	±0
National Democracy (DN)	205	0.07	New	0	±0
Authentic Phalanx (FA)	172	0.06	New	0	±0
Republican Party (PRF)	152	0.05	New	0	±0
The Phalanx (FE)	121	0.04	–0.05	0	±0
Republican Social Movement (MSR)	60	0.02	New	0	±0
Blank ballots	5,025	1.61	+0.29		
Total	312,174			5	±0
Valid votes	312,174	99.14	–0.02		
Invalid votes	2,703	0.86	+0.02		
Votes cast / turnout	314,877	78.41	+4.71		
Abstentions	86,682	21.59	–4.71		
Registered voters	401,559				

=== 2000 ===
Summary of the 12 March 2000 Congress of Deputies election results in Castellón
Parties and alliances	Popular vote			Seats	
Parties and alliances	Votes	%	±pp	Total	+/−
People's Party (PP)	152,462	53.79	+7.32	3	±0
Spanish Socialist Workers' Party–Progressives (PSOE–p)	100,177	35.35	–4.64	2	±0
United Left of the Valencian Country (EUPV)	10,773	3.80	–3.80	0	±0
Valencian Nationalist Bloc–The Greens–Valencians for Change (BNV–EV)^{1}	6,678	2.36	+0.12	0	±0
Valencian Union (UV)	3,511	1.24	–0.72	0	±0
The Eco-pacifist Greens (LVEP)	2,111	0.74	New	0	±0
Internationalist Socialist Workers' Party (POSI)	997	0.35	New	0	±0
Liberal Independent Group (GIL)	668	0.24	New	0	±0
Front for the Valencian Country–Republican Left of Catalonia (Front–ERC)	662	0.23	–0.05	0	±0
Communist Party of the Peoples of Spain (PCPE)	263	0.09	–0.13	0	±0
Centrist Union–Democratic and Social Centre (UC–CDS)	258	0.09	–0.09	0	±0
The Phalanx (FE)	242	0.09	New	0	±0
Humanist Party (PH)	171	0.06	+0.01	0	±0
Carlist Party (PC)	159	0.06	New	0	±0
Natural Law Party (PLN)	131	0.05	New	0	±0
Spain 2000 Platform (ES2000)	118	0.04	New	0	±0
Valencian Nationalist Left (ENV)	118	0.04	–0.01	0	±0
Catalan State (EC)	113	0.04	New	0	±0
Spanish Democratic Party (PADE)	62	0.02	New	0	±0
Republican Action (AR)	0	0.00	New	0	±0
Blank ballots	3,751	1.32	+0.47		
Total	283,425			5	±0
Valid votes	283,425	99.16	–0.22		
Invalid votes	2,391	0.84	+0.22		
Votes cast / turnout	285,816	73.70	–7.86		
Abstentions	102,007	26.30	+7.86		
Registered voters	387,823				
Sources
Footnotes: ^{1} Valencian Nationalist Bloc–The Greens–Valencians for Change results are compared to the combined totals of Valencian People's Union–Nationalist Bloc and The Greens of the Valencian Country in the 1996 election.

=== 1996 ===
Summary of the 3 March 1996 Congress of Deputies election results in Castellón
Parties and alliances	Popular vote			Seats	
Parties and alliances	Votes	%	±pp	Total	+/−
People's Party (PP)	140,578	46.47	+1.60	3	±0
Spanish Socialist Workers' Party (PSOE)	120,997	39.99	+0.40	2	±0
United Left of the Valencian Country (EUPV)	23,003	7.60	+0.55	0	±0
Valencian Union (UV)	5,933	1.96	+0.21	0	±0
Valencian People's Union–Nationalist Bloc (UPV–BN)	4,341	1.43	–0.71	0	±0
The Greens of the Valencian Country (EV)	2,446	0.81	+0.01	0	±0
Republican Left of Catalonia (ERC)	840	0.28	New	0	±0
Communist Party of the Peoples of Spain (PCPE)	666	0.22	New	0	±0
Centrist Union (UC)	544	0.18	–1.86	0	±0
Workers' Revolutionary Party (PRT)	174	0.06	New	0	±0
Authentic Spanish Phalanx (FEA)	163	0.05	New	0	±0
Valencian Nationalist Left (ENV)	157	0.05	–0.01	0	±0
Humanist Party (PH)	144	0.05	+0.02	0	±0
Blank ballots	2,559	0.85	+0.20		
Total	302,545			5	±0
Valid votes	302,545	99.38	+0.16		
Invalid votes	1,885	0.62	–0.16		
Votes cast / turnout	304,430	81.56	+0.44		
Abstentions	68,809	18.44	–0.44		
Registered voters	373,239				

=== 1993 ===
Summary of the 6 June 1993 Congress of Deputies election results in Castellón
Parties and alliances	Popular vote			Seats	
Parties and alliances	Votes	%	±pp	Total	+/−
People's Party (PP)	128,916	44.87	+10.99	3	+1
Spanish Socialist Workers' Party (PSOE)	113,752	39.59	–2.09	2	–1
United Left of the Valencian Country (EU–PV)	20,250	7.05	+1.56	0	±0
Valencian People's Union (UPV)	6,135	2.14	–0.32	0	±0
Democratic and Social Centre (CDS)	5,867	2.04	–6.76	0	±0
Valencian Union (UV)	5,014	1.75	+0.47	0	±0
The Greens (LV)^{1}	2,294	0.80	–0.67	0	±0
The Ecologists (LE)	1,096	0.38	–0.36	0	±0
Ruiz-Mateos Group–European Democratic Alliance (ARM–ADE)	564	0.20	–0.99	0	±0
Spanish Democratic Republican Action (ARDE)	501	0.17	New	0	±0
Revolutionary Workers' Party (POR)	209	0.07	New	0	±0
Valencian Nationalist Left (ENV)	164	0.06	–0.05	0	±0
Spanish Phalanx of the CNSO (FE–JONS)	163	0.06	–0.07	0	±0
Cantonal Party of Castellón (PCAN)	158	0.05	New	0	±0
Natural Law Party (PLN)	140	0.05	New	0	±0
Coalition for a New Socialist Party (CNPS)^{2}	119	0.04	–0.15	0	±0
Humanist Party (PH)	99	0.03	–0.04	0	±0
Communist Unification of Spain (UCE)	0	0.00	New	0	±0
Blank ballots	1,881	0.65	–0.01		
Total	287,322			5	±0
Valid votes	287,322	99.22	+0.14		
Invalid votes	2,267	0.78	–0.14		
Votes cast / turnout	289,589	81.12	+5.80		
Abstentions	67,405	18.88	–5.80		
Registered voters	356,994				
Sources
Footnotes: ^{1} The Greens results are compared to The Greens–Green List totals in the 1989 election.; ^{2} Coalition for a New Socialist Party results are compared to Alliance for the Republic totals in the 1989 election.

=== 1989 ===
Summary of the 29 October 1989 Congress of Deputies election results in Castellón
Parties and alliances	Popular vote			Seats	
Parties and alliances	Votes	%	±pp	Total	+/−
Spanish Socialist Workers' Party (PSOE)	106,223	41.68	–4.57	3	±0
People's Party (PP)^{1}	86,359	33.88	+0.52	2	±0
Democratic and Social Centre (CDS)	22,428	8.80	–0.16	0	±0
United Left–United Left of the Valencian Country (IU–EU)	14,004	5.49	+3.10	0	±0
Valencian People's Union (UPV)	6,267	2.46	+0.31	0	±0
The Greens–Green List (LV–LV)	3,753	1.47	+0.91	0	±0
Valencian Union (UV)	3,254	1.28	+0.76	0	±0
Ruiz-Mateos Group (Ruiz-Mateos)	3,042	1.19	New	0	±0
Workers' Party of Spain–Communist Unity (PTE–UC)^{2}	1,999	0.78	–0.76	0	±0
The Ecologist Greens (LVE)	1,877	0.74	New	0	±0
Workers' Socialist Party (PST)	1,238	0.49	+0.05	0	±0
Social Democratic Coalition (CSD)	979	0.38	New	0	±0
Communist Party of the Peoples of Spain (PCPE)	525	0.21	New	0	±0
Alliance for the Republic (AxR)^{3}	476	0.19	+0.05	0	±0
Spanish Phalanx of the CNSO (FE–JONS)	319	0.13	–0.07	0	±0
Valencian Nationalist Left–Valencian Regional Union (ENV–URV)	278	0.11	New	0	±0
Humanist Party (PH)	176	0.07	New	0	±0
Communist Party of Spain (Marxist–Leninist) (PCE (m–l))^{4}	0	0.00	–0.22	0	±0
Blank ballots	1,673	0.66	+0.10		
Total	254,870			5	±0
Valid votes	254,870	99.08	+1.20		
Invalid votes	2,366	0.92	–1.20		
Votes cast / turnout	257,236	75.32	–2.51		
Abstentions	84,268	24.68	+2.51		
Registered voters	341,504				
Sources
Footnotes: ^{1} People's Party results are compared to People's Coalition totals in the 1986 election.; ^{2} Workers' Party of Spain–Communist Unity results are compared to Communists' Unity Board totals in the 1986 election.; ^{3} Alliance for the Republic results are compared to Internationalist Socialist Workers' Party totals in the 1986 election.; ^{4} Communist Party of Spain (Marxist–Leninist) results are compared to Republican Popular Unity totals in the 1986 election.

=== 1986 ===
Summary of the 22 June 1986 Congress of Deputies election results in Castellón
Parties and alliances	Popular vote			Seats	
Parties and alliances	Votes	%	±pp	Total	+/−
Spanish Socialist Workers' Party (PSOE)	119,250	46.25	–3.37	3	±0
People's Coalition (AP–PDP–PL)^{1}	86,032	33.36	+5.22	2	±0
Democratic and Social Centre (CDS)	23,113	8.96	+6.25	0	±0
Democratic Reformist Party (PRD)	6,447	2.50	New	0	±0
United Left (IU)^{2}	6,155	2.39	–0.77	0	±0
Valencian People's Union (UPV)	5,556	2.15	+1.54	0	±0
Communists' Unity Board (MUC)	3,961	1.54	New	0	±0
The Greens (LV)	1,448	0.56	New	0	±0
Valencian Union (UV)	1,351	0.52	New	0	±0
Workers' Socialist Party (PST)	1,124	0.44	+0.09	0	±0
Republican Popular Unity (UPR)^{3}	573	0.22	+0.12	0	±0
Communist Unification of Spain (UCE)	528	0.20	+0.11	0	±0
Spanish Phalanx of the CNSO (FE–JONS)	509	0.20	+0.20	0	±0
Internationalist Socialist Workers' Party (POSI)	366	0.14	New	0	±0
Party of the Communists of Catalonia (PCC)	0	0.00	New	0	±0
Blank ballots	1,450	0.56	+0.14		
Total	257,863			5	±0
Valid votes	257,863	97.88	+0.74		
Invalid votes	5,593	2.12	–0.74		
Votes cast / turnout	263,456	77.83	–8.11		
Abstentions	75,040	22.17	+8.11		
Registered voters	338,496				
Sources
Footnotes: ^{1} People's Coalition results are compared to People's Alliance–People's Democratic Party–Valencian Union totals in the 1982 election.; ^{2} United Left results are compared to Communist Party of the Valencian Country totals in the 1982 election.; ^{3} Republican Popular Unity results are compared to Communist Party of Spain (Marxist–Leninist) totals in the 1982 election.

=== 1982 ===
Summary of the 28 October 1982 Congress of Deputies election results in Castellón
Parties and alliances	Popular vote			Seats	
Parties and alliances	Votes	%	±pp	Total	+/−
Spanish Socialist Workers' Party (PSOE)	130,200	49.62	+13.94	3	+1
People's Alliance–People's Democratic Party–Valencian Union (AP–PDP–UV)^{1}	73,826	28.14	+24.65	2	+2
Union of the Democratic Centre (UCD)	33,547	12.79	–33.55	0	–3
Communist Party of the Valencian Country (PCE–PV)	8,280	3.16	–4.06	0	±0
Democratic and Social Centre (CDS)	7,100	2.71	New	0	±0
New Force (FN)^{2}	2,777	1.06	–1.03	0	±0
United Left of the Valencian Country (EUPV)	1,967	0.75	New	0	±0
Valencian People's Union (UPV)	1,589	0.61	New	0	±0
Workers' Socialist Party (PST)	915	0.35	New	0	±0
Communist League–Internationalist Socialist Workers' Coalition (LC (COSI))	299	0.11	New	0	±0
Communist Party of Spain (Marxist–Leninist) (PCE (m–l))	252	0.10	New	0	±0
Communist Unification of Spain (UCE)	240	0.09	New	0	±0
Independent Spanish Phalanx (FEI)	177	0.07	New	0	±0
Falangist Movement of Spain (MFE)	124	0.05	New	0	±0
Spanish Phalanx of the CNSO (FE–JONS)	0	0.00	New	0	±0
Socialist Party (PS)^{3}	0	0.00	–1.21	0	±0
Blank ballots	1,089	0.42	+0.09		
Total	262,382			5	±0
Valid votes	262,382	97.14	–1.50		
Invalid votes	7,736	2.86	+1.50		
Votes cast / turnout	270,118	85.94	+7.23		
Abstentions	44,182	14.06	–7.23		
Registered voters	314,300				
Sources
Footnotes: ^{1} People's Alliance–People's Democratic Party–Valencian Union results are compared to Democratic Coalition totals in the 1979 election.; ^{2} New Force results are compared to National Union totals in the 1979 election.; ^{3} Socialist Party results are compared to Spanish Socialist Workers' Party (historical) totals in the 1979 election.

=== 1979 ===
Summary of the 1 March 1979 Congress of Deputies election results in Castellón
Parties and alliances	Popular vote			Seats	
Parties and alliances	Votes	%	±pp	Total	+/−
Union of the Democratic Centre (UCD)	111,359	46.34	+11.02	3	+1
Spanish Socialist Workers' Party (PSOE)^{1}	85,727	35.68	+3.60	2	±0
Communist Party of Spain (PCE)	17,361	7.22	+1.33	0	±0
Democratic Coalition (CD)^{2}	8,382	3.49	–2.64	0	±0
National Union (UN)^{3}	5,033	2.09	+1.14	0	±0
Spanish Socialist Workers' Party (historical) (PSOEh)^{4}	2,913	1.21	+0.12	0	±0
Carlist Party (PC)	1,275	0.53	New	0	±0
Left Bloc for National Liberation (BEAN)	1,060	0.44	New	0	±0
Party of Labour of Spain (PTE)^{5}	1,012	0.42	–0.02	0	±0
Communist Organization of Spain (Red Flag) (OCE–BR)	962	0.40	New	0	±0
Workers' Revolutionary Organization (ORT)	957	0.40	New	0	±0
Communist Movement–Organization of Communist Left (MCPV–OIC)	921	0.38	New	0	±0
Republican Left (IR)	887	0.37	New	0	±0
Workers' Communist Party (PCT)	480	0.20	New	0	±0
Spanish Phalanx of the CNSO (Authentic) (FE–JONS(A))	421	0.18	New	0	±0
Workers and Peasants Party (POC)	417	0.17	New	0	±0
Revolutionary Communist League (LCR)^{6}	341	0.14	–0.29	0	±0
Centre Independent Candidacy (CIC)	n/a	n/a	–12.53	0	–1
Blank ballots	791	0.33	+0.02		
Total	240,299			5	±0
Valid votes	240,299	98.64	+0.30		
Invalid votes	3,302	1.36	–0.30		
Votes cast / turnout	243,601	78.71	–6.82		
Abstentions	65,893	21.29	+6.82		
Registered voters	309,494				
Sources
Footnotes: ^{1} Spanish Socialist Workers' Party results are compared to the combined totals of Spanish Socialist Workers' Party and People's Socialist Party–Socialist Unity in the 1977 election.; ^{2} Democratic Coalition results are compared to People's Alliance totals in the 1977 election.; ^{3} National Union results are compared to the combined totals of Spanish Phalanx of the CNSO and New Force in the 1977 election.; ^{4} Spanish Socialist Workers' Party (historical) results are compared to Democratic Socialist Alliance totals in the 1977 election.; ^{5} Party of Labour of Spain results are compared to Democratic Left Front totals in the 1977 election.; ^{6} Revolutionary Communist League results are compared to Front for Workers' Unity totals in the 1977 election.

=== 1977 ===
Summary of the 15 June 1977 Congress of Deputies election results in Castellón
Parties and alliances	Popular vote			Seats	
Parties and alliances	Votes	%	±pp	Total	+/−
Union of the Democratic Centre (UCD)	84,115	35.32	n/a	2	n/a
Spanish Socialist Workers' Party (PSOE)	69,976	29.38	n/a	2	n/a
Centre Independent Candidacy (CIC)	29,834	12.53	n/a	1	n/a
People's Alliance (AP)	14,596	6.13	n/a	0	n/a
Communist Party of Spain (PCE)	14,029	5.89	n/a	0	n/a
People's Socialist Party–Socialist Unity (PSP–US)	6,430	2.70	n/a	0	n/a
Christian Democratic Team of the Spanish State (FDC–UDPV)	5,515	2.32	n/a	0	n/a
Socialist Party of the Valencian Country (PSPV)	3,727	1.56	n/a	0	n/a
Democratic Socialist Alliance (ASDCI)	2,600	1.09	n/a	0	n/a
Carlist Electors of the Valencian Country (ECPV)	2,252	0.95	n/a	0	n/a
Spanish Phalanx of the CNSO (FE–JONS)	1,389	0.58	n/a	0	n/a
Democratic Left Front (FDI)	1,040	0.44	n/a	0	n/a
Front for Workers' Unity (FUT)	1,024	0.43	n/a	0	n/a
New Force (FN)	877	0.37	n/a	0	n/a
Blank ballots	750	0.31	n/a		
Total	238,154			5	n/a
Valid votes	238,154	98.34	n/a		
Invalid votes	4,032	1.66	n/a		
Votes cast / turnout	242,186	85.53	n/a		
Abstentions	40,975	14.47	n/a		
Registered voters	283,161				

== Bibliography ==
- Ley 1/1977, de 4 de enero, para la Reforma Política (Fundamental Law 1/1977). Official State Gazette (in Spanish). 4 January 1977. BOE-A-1977-165.
- Real Decreto-ley 20/1977, de 18 de marzo, sobre Normas Electorales (Royal Decree-Law 20/1977). Official State Gazette (in Spanish). 18 March 1977. BOE-A-1977-7445.
- Constitución Española (Constitution). Official State Gazette (in Spanish). 27 December 1978. BOE-A-1978-31229.
- Ley Orgánica 5/1985, de 19 de junio, del Régimen Electoral General (Organic Law 5/1985). Official State Gazette (in Spanish). 19 June 1985. BOE-A-1985-11672.
- Carreras de Odriozola, Albert; Tafunell Sambola, Xavier (2005) [1989]. Estadísticas históricas de España, siglos XIX-XX (PDF) (in Spanish). Vol. 1 (II ed.). Bilbao: Fundación BBVA. pp. 1072–1097. ISBN 84-96515-00-1. Archived from the original (PDF) on 24 September 2015.
