= Alicante (Corts Valencianes constituency) =

Coordinates: 38°30′N 0°30′W

- Corts Valencianes; Electoral constituency
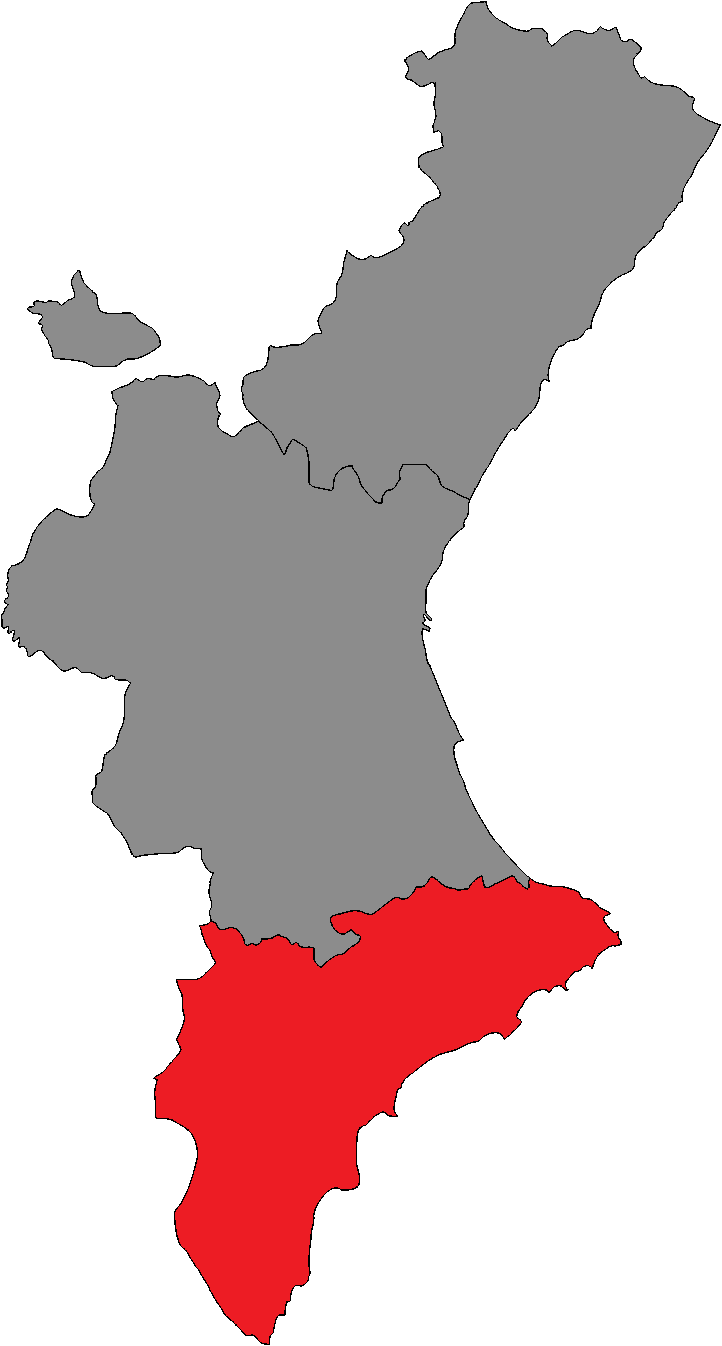
- Location of Alicante within the Valencian Community
- Province: Alicante
- Autonomous community: Valencian Community
- Population: ▲1,991,259 (2024)
- Electorate: ▲1,304,381 (2023)
- Major settlements: Alicante, Elche, Alcoy, Elda, Benidorm, Orihuela

Current constituency
- Created: 1983
- Seats: 29 (1983–1991); 30 (1991–2007); 35 (2007–present)
- Members: PP (15); PSPV (11); Vox (5); Compromís (4)

Alicante (Valencian: Alacant) is one of the three constituencies (Spanish: circunscripciones) represented in the Corts Valencianes, the regional legislature of the Valencian Community. The constituency currently elects 35 deputies. Its boundaries correspond to those of the Spanish province of Alicante. The electoral system uses the D'Hondt method and closed-list proportional representation, with a minimum threshold of five percent regionally.

== Electoral system ==
The constituency was created as per the Statute of Autonomy of the Valencian Community of 1982 and was first contested in the 1983 regional election. The Statute provided for the three provinces in the Valencian Community—Alicante, Castellón and Valencia—to be established as multi-member districts in the Corts Valencianes, with this regulation being maintained under the 1987 regional electoral law. Each constituency is entitled to an initial minimum of 20 seats, with the remaining 39—29 until 2007—being distributed in proportion to their populations (provided that the seat-to-population ratio in any given province did not exceed three times that of any other). The exception was the 1983 election, when each constituency was allocated a fixed number of seats: 29 for Alicante, 25 for Castellón and 35 for Valencia.

Voting is on the basis of universal suffrage, which comprises all nationals over eighteen, registered in the Valencian Community and in full enjoyment of their political rights. Amendments to the electoral law in 2011 required for Valencians abroad to apply for voting before being permitted to vote, a system known as "begged" or expat vote (Spanish: Voto rogado) which was abolished in 2022. Seats are elected using the D'Hondt method and a closed list proportional representation, with a threshold of five percent of valid votes—which includes blank ballots—being applied regionally. Parties not reaching the threshold are not taken into consideration for seat distribution.

The electoral law allows for parties and federations registered in the interior ministry, coalitions and groupings of electors to present lists of candidates. Parties and federations intending to form a coalition ahead of an election are required to inform the relevant Electoral Commission within ten days of the election call—fifteen before 1985—whereas groupings of electors need to secure the signature of at least one percent of the electorate in the constituencies for which they seek election—one-thousandth of the electorate, with a compulsory minimum of 500 signatures, until 1985—disallowing electors from signing for more than one list of candidates.

== Deputies ==
Deputies 1983–present
Key to parties PCE–PCPV EUPV IU–UPV CPV Unides Podem Podemos/Podem Compromís PSPV–PSOE CDS Cs PP CP AP Vox
Corts	Election	Distribution
1st	1983	2 / 17 / 10
2nd	1987	2 / 14 / 4 / 9
3rd	1991	2 / 16 / 12
4th	1995	3 / 12 / 15
5th	1999	2 / 12 / 16
6th	2003	2 / 12 / 16
7th	2007	2 / 14 / 19
8th	2011	2 / 1 / 12 / 20
9th	2015	5 / 5 / 9 / 5 / 11
10th	2019	3 / 4 / 10 / 7 / 7 / 4
11th	2023	4 / 11 / 15 / 5

== Regional elections ==
=== 2023 ===
Summary of the 28 May 2023 Corts Valencianes election results in Alicante
Parties and alliances	Popular vote			Seats	
Parties and alliances	Votes	%	±pp	Total	+/−
People's Party (PP)	319,981	39.28	+19.21	15	+8
Socialist Party of the Valencian Country (PSPV–PSOE)	240,447	29.52	+3.96	11	+1
Vox (Vox)	100,331	12.32	+1.04	5	+1
Commitment: Més–Initiative–Greens Equo (Compromís)	82,878	10.17	–0.81	4	±0
United We Can–United Left (Unides Podem–EUPV)	28,540	3.50	–5.75	0	–3
Citizens–Party of the Citizenry (CS)	12,531	1.54	–17.60	0	–7
Animalist Party with the Environment (PACMA)^{1}	7,757	0.95	–0.62	0	±0
The Eco-pacifist Greens (Centro Moderado)^{2}	4,846	0.59	+0.15	0	±0
Communist Party of the Peoples of Spain (PCPE)	1,461	0.18	–0.01	0	±0
Republican Left of the Valencian Country (ERPV)	1,318	0.16	±0.00	0	±0
United Coalition (Units)	1,055	0.13	New	0	±0
Zero Cuts (Recortes Cero)	897	0.11	New	0	±0
Regionalist Alicantine Party–Citizen Hope (PAR–EsC)	641	0.08	New	0	±0
Alliance for the Commerce and Housing (AlianzaCV)	598	0.07	New	0	±0
Valencian Republic–European Valencianist Party (RV–PVE)	532	0.07	–0.03	0	±0
Decide (Decidix)	377	0.05	New	0	±0
Blank ballots	10,386	1.28	+0.48		
Total	814,576			35	±0
Valid votes	814,576	98.68	+0.06		
Invalid votes	10,887	1.32	–0.06		
Votes cast / turnout	825,463	63.28	–8.87		
Abstentions	478,918	36.72	+8.87		
Registered voters	1,304,381				

=== 2019 ===
Summary of the 28 April 2019 Corts Valencianes election results in Alicante
Parties and alliances	Popular vote			Seats	
Parties and alliances	Votes	%	±pp	Total	+/−
Socialist Party of the Valencian Country (PSPV–PSOE)	231,662	25.56	+2.88	10	+1
People's Party (PP)	181,867	20.07	–7.67	7	–4
Citizens–Party of the Citizenry (Cs)	173,468	19.14	+4.99	7	+2
Vox (Vox)	102,239	11.28	+10.92	4	+4
Commitment: Bloc–Initiative–Greens Equo (Compromís)	99,488	10.98	–1.52	4	–1
United We Can–United Left (Unides Podem–EUPV)^{1}	83,855	9.25	–7.29	3	–2
Animalist Party Against Mistreatment of Animals (PACMA)	14,271	1.57	+0.66	0	±0
The Eco-pacifist Greens–Forward (Avant/Adelante–LVEP)	3,980	0.44	New	0	±0
Seniors in Action (3e en acción)	1,869	0.21	New	0	±0
Communist Party of the Peoples of Spain (PCPE)	1,757	0.19	+0.01	0	±0
Republican Left of the Valencian Country (ERPV)	1,471	0.16	New	0	±0
Act (PACT)	1,230	0.14	New	0	±0
Valencian Republic–European Valencianist Party (RV–PVE)	929	0.10	New	0	±0
Republican Alternative (ALTER)	620	0.07	New	0	±0
Blank ballots	7,229	0.80	–0.75		
Total	906,189			35	±0
Valid votes	906,189	98.62	+0.14		
Invalid votes	12,639	1.38	–0.14		
Votes cast / turnout	918,828	72.15	+6.20		
Abstentions	354,692	27.85	–6.20		
Registered voters	1,273,520				
Sources
Footnotes: ^{1} United We Can–United Left results are compared to the combined totals of We Can and Citizen Agreement in the 2015 election.

=== 2015 ===
Summary of the 24 May 2015 Corts Valencianes election results in Alicante
Parties and alliances	Popular vote			Seats	
Parties and alliances	Votes	%	±pp	Total	+/−
People's Party (PP)	224,935	27.74	–21.89	11	–9
Socialist Party of the Valencian Country (PSPV–PSOE)	183,946	22.68	–7.17	9	–3
Citizens–Party of the Citizenry (C's)	114,724	14.15	New	5	+5
Commitment Coalition: Bloc–Initiative–Greens (Compromís)	101,368	12.50	+7.93	5	+4
We Can (Podemos/Podem)	98,792	12.18	New	5	+5
Citizen Agreement (EUPV–EV–ERPV–AS)^{1}	35,324	4.36	–3.30	0	–2
Union, Progress and Democracy (UPyD)	12,003	1.48	–1.62	0	±0
Let's Win Valencian Country (Ganemos)	8,096	1.00	New	0	±0
Animalist Party Against Mistreatment of Animals (PACMA)	7,361	0.91	+0.48	0	±0
Vox (Vox)	2,958	0.36	New	0	±0
Spanish Phalanx of the CNSO (FE–JONS)	1,615	0.20	New	0	±0
Communist Party of the Peoples of Spain (PCPE)	1,444	0.18	+0.04	0	±0
Zero Cuts (Recortes Cero)	1,287	0.16	New	0	±0
Citizen Hope (EsC)	1,129	0.14	New	0	±0
Spain 2000 (E–2000)	1,011	0.12	–0.08	0	±0
Democratic Forum (FDEE)	799	0.10	New	0	±0
Libertarian Party (P–LIB)	597	0.07	New	0	±0
Together (Junts)	558	0.07	New	0	±0
The National Coalition (LCN)	407	0.05	New	0	±0
Blank ballots	12,550	1.55	–1.03		
Total	810,904			35	±0
Valid votes	810,904	98.48	+0.15		
Invalid votes	12,540	1.52	–0.15		
Votes cast / turnout	823,444	65.95	–2.25		
Abstentions	425,106	34.05	+2.25		
Registered voters	1,248,550				
Sources
Footnotes: ^{1} Citizen Agreement results are compared to the combined totals of United Left of the Valencian Country, Greens and Eco-pacifists and Republican Left of the Valencian Country in the 2011 election.

=== 2011 ===
Summary of the 22 May 2011 Corts Valencianes election results in Alicante
Parties and alliances	Popular vote			Seats	
Parties and alliances	Votes	%	±pp	Total	+/−
People's Party (PP)	405,305	49.63	–2.16	20	+1
Socialist Party of the Valencian Country (PSPV–PSOE)	243,817	29.85	–6.72	12	–2
United Left of the Valencian Country (EUPV)^{1}	43,881	5.37	n/a	2	±0
Bloc–Initiative–Greens: Commitment Coalition (Compromís)^{1}	37,301	4.57	n/a	1	+1
Union, Progress and Democracy (UPyD)	25,312	3.10	New	0	±0
Greens and Eco-pacifists (VyE)	15,328	1.88	New	0	±0
Liberal Democratic Centre (CDL)	4,579	0.56	+0.46	0	±0
Anti-Bullfighting Party Against Mistreatment of Animals (PACMA)	3,537	0.43	New	0	±0
Republican Left of the Valencian Country (ERPV)	3,342	0.41	–0.03	0	±0
Renewal Liberal Centre (CLR)	2,463	0.30	+0.12	0	±0
Spain 2000 (E–2000)	1,600	0.20	+0.07	0	±0
Communist Party of the Peoples of Spain (PCPE)	1,515	0.19	+0.02	0	±0
Humanist Party (PH)	1,376	0.17	+0.06	0	±0
Valencian Coalition (CVa)	1,296	0.16	±0.00	0	±0
Authentic Phalanx (FA)	1,171	0.14	–0.01	0	±0
Family and Life Party (PFyV)	982	0.12	New	0	±0
Movement for People's Unity–Republicans (MUP–R)	911	0.11	+0.01	0	±0
Communist Unification of Spain (UCE)	833	0.10	New	0	±0
National Democracy (DN)	681	0.08	New	0	±0
United for Valencia (UxV)	429	0.05	–0.03	0	±0
Blank ballots	21,034	2.58	+1.14		
Total	816,693			35	±0
Valid votes	816,693	98.31	–0.91		
Invalid votes	14,010	1.69	+0.91		
Votes cast / turnout	830,703	68.20	+0.15		
Abstentions	387,423	31.80	–0.15		
Registered voters	1,218,126				
Sources
Footnotes: ^{1} Within the Commitment for the Valencian Country alliance in the 2007 election.

=== 2007 ===
Summary of the 27 May 2007 Corts Valencianes election results in Alicante
Parties and alliances	Popular vote			Seats	
Parties and alliances	Votes	%	±pp	Total	+/−
People's Party (PP)	415,016	51.79	+3.47	19	+3
Socialist Party of the Valencian Country (PSPV–PSOE)	293,073	36.57	–0.62	14	+2
Commitment for the Valencian Country (Compromís PV)^{1}	54,261	6.77	–3.02	2	±0
Valencian Union–The Eco-pacifist Greens (UV–LVEP)	8,544	1.07	–0.71	0	±0
Social Democratic Party (PSD)	4,405	0.55	New	0	±0
Republican Left of the Valencian Country (ERPV)	3,566	0.44	+0.18	0	±0
Liberal Centre (CL)	1,511	0.19	New	0	±0
Renewal Liberal Centre (CLR)	1,461	0.18	New	0	±0
Communist Party of the Peoples of Spain (PCPE)	1,402	0.17	–0.02	0	±0
Valencian Coalition (CVa)	1,317	0.16	New	0	±0
Authentic Phalanx (FA)	1,193	0.15	+0.02	0	±0
Spain 2000 (E–2000)	1,036	0.13	+0.06	0	±0
Humanist Party (PH)	896	0.11	–0.06	0	±0
Liberal Democratic Centre (CDL)	785	0.10	New	0	±0
Movement for People's Unity–Republicans (MUP–R)	780	0.10	New	0	±0
United for Valencia (UxV)	627	0.08	New	0	±0
Blank ballots	11,531	1.44	–0.15		
Total	801,404			35	+5
Valid votes	801,404	99.22	–0.09		
Invalid votes	6,317	0.78	+0.09		
Votes cast / turnout	807,721	68.05	–1.68		
Abstentions	379,313	31.95	+1.68		
Registered voters	1,187,034				
Sources
Footnotes: ^{1} Commitment for the Valencian Country results are compared to the combined totals of United Left–The Greens–Valencian Left: Agreement and Valencian Nationalist Bloc–Green Left in the 2003 election.

=== 2003 ===
Summary of the 25 May 2003 Corts Valencianes election results in Alicante
Parties and alliances	Popular vote			Seats	
Parties and alliances	Votes	%	±pp	Total	+/−
People's Party (PP)	383,409	48.32	–0.39	16	±0
Socialist Party of the Valencian Country (PSPV–PSOE)	295,084	37.19	+1.18	12	±0
United Left–The Greens–Valencian Left: The Agreement (L'Entesa)	46,831	5.90	–0.17	2	±0
Valencian Nationalist Bloc–Green Left (Bloc–EV)	30,865	3.89	+0.22	0	±0
Union–Valencian Union (UV)	14,089	1.78	+0.04	0	±0
Republican Left of the Valencian Country (ERPV)	2,092	0.26	New	0	±0
Democratic and Social Centre (CDS)	1,593	0.20	+0.02	0	±0
Communist Party of the Peoples of Spain (PCPE)	1,520	0.19	New	0	±0
Humanist Party (PH)	1,350	0.17	+0.05	0	±0
Authentic Phalanx (FA)	1,071	0.13	New	0	±0
Regional Party of the Valencian Community (PRCV)	904	0.11	New	0	±0
National Democracy (DN)	798	0.10	New	0	±0
Federal Republican Party (PRF)	680	0.09	+0.03	0	±0
Spain 2000 (E–2000)	569	0.07	New	0	±0
Blank ballots	12,638	1.59	+0.01		
Total	793,493			30	±0
Valid votes	793,493	99.31	–0.04		
Invalid votes	5,551	0.69	+0.04		
Votes cast / turnout	799,044	69.73	+2.05		
Abstentions	346,896	30.27	–2.05		
Registered voters	1,145,940				

=== 1999 ===
Summary of the 13 June 1999 Corts Valencianes election results in Alicante
Parties and alliances	Popular vote			Seats	
Parties and alliances	Votes	%	±pp	Total	+/−
People's Party (PP)	357,815	48.71	+2.05	16	+1
Spanish Socialist Workers' Party–Progressives (PSOE–p)	264,583	36.01	+0.05	12	±0
United Left of the Valencian Country (EUPV)	44,583	6.07	–4.87	2	–1
Valencian Nationalist Bloc–The Greens (BNV–EV)^{1}	26,977	3.67	+1.30	0	±0
Valencian Union (UV)	12,757	1.74	–0.35	0	±0
Liberal Centre (CL)	4,813	0.66	New	0	±0
The Ecologist–Pacifist Greens (LVEP)	4,176	0.57	New	0	±0
Independent Initiative (II)	2,524	0.34	New	0	±0
Spanish Phalanx of the CNSO (FE–JONS)	1,467	0.20	+0.05	0	±0
Centrist Union–Democratic and Social Centre (UC–CDS)	1,337	0.18	New	0	±0
Humanist Party (PH)	918	0.12	New	0	±0
Valencian Nationalist Left (ENV)	673	0.09	±0.00	0	±0
Federal Republican Left–Federal Republican Party (IRF–PRF)	454	0.06	New	0	±0
Blank ballots	11,575	1.58	+0.47		
Total	734,652			30	±0
Valid votes	734,652	99.35	–0.04		
Invalid votes	4,832	0.65	+0.04		
Votes cast / turnout	739,484	67.68	–7.52		
Abstentions	353,104	32.32	+7.52		
Registered voters	1,092,588				
Sources
Footnotes: ^{1} Valencian Nationalist Bloc–The Greens results are compared to Valencian People's Union–Nationalist Bloc totals in the 1995 election.

=== 1995 ===
Summary of the 28 May 1995 Corts Valencianes election results in Alicante
Parties and alliances	Popular vote			Seats	
Parties and alliances	Votes	%	±pp	Total	+/−
People's Party (PP)	351,329	46.66	+13.58	15	+3
Spanish Socialist Workers' Party (PSOE)	270,704	35.96	–8.68	12	–4
United Left–The Greens (EU–EV)^{1}	82,379	10.94	+2.02	3	+1
Valencian People's Union–Nationalist Bloc (UPV–BN)	17,864	2.37	–0.45	0	±0
Valencian Union–Independents–Centrists (UV–FICVA–CCV)	15,706	2.09	+0.37	0	±0
United Alicante (AU)	2,328	0.31	New	0	±0
Communist Party of the Peoples of Spain (PCPE)	1,746	0.23	+0.04	0	±0
Spanish Phalanx of the CNSO (FE–JONS)	1,092	0.15	New	0	±0
Autonomist Republican Party (PRA)	718	0.10	New	0	±0
Valencian Nationalist Left (ENV)^{2}	641	0.09	New	0	±0
Blank ballots	8,373	1.11	+0.06		
Total	752,880			30	±0
Valid votes	752,880	99.39	–0.02		
Invalid votes	4,633	0.61	+0.02		
Votes cast / turnout	757,513	75.20	+7.30		
Abstentions	249,773	24.80	–7.30		
Registered voters	1,007,286				
Sources
Footnotes: ^{1} United Left–The Greens results are compared to the combined totals of United Left of the Valencian Country and The Greens in the 1991 election.; ^{2} Valencian Nationalist Left results are compared to Valencian Nationalist Union totals in the 1991 election.

=== 1991 ===
Summary of the 26 May 1991 Corts Valencianes election results in Alicante
Parties and alliances	Popular vote			Seats	
Parties and alliances	Votes	%	±pp	Total	+/−
Spanish Socialist Workers' Party (PSOE)	279,594	44.64	+2.01	16	+2
People's Party (PP)^{1}	207,159	33.08	+3.08	12	+3
United Left of the Valencian Country (EUPV)^{2}	45,458	7.26	n/a	2	+1
Democratic and Social Centre (CDS)	36,675	5.86	–8.47	0	–4
Valencian People's Union (UPV)^{2}	17,655	2.82	n/a	0	–1
Valencian Union (UV)	10,794	1.72	+0.92	0	±0
The Greens (LV)	10,422	1.66	–0.12	0	±0
The Greens of Alicante–Green Union (LVA–UVE)	5,569	0.89	New	0	±0
Cantonalist Party of the Alicantine Country (Alicantón)	3,484	0.56	New	0	±0
Socialist Democracy (DS)	1,632	0.26	New	0	±0
Left Platform (PCE (m–l)–CRPE)^{3}	1,221	0.19	–0.03	0	±0
Blank ballots	6,600	1.05	–0.11		
Total	626,263			30	+1
Valid votes	626,263	99.41	+0.45		
Invalid votes	3,721	0.59	–0.45		
Votes cast / turnout	629,984	67.90	–4.69		
Abstentions	297,828	32.10	+4.69		
Registered voters	927,812				
Sources
Footnotes: ^{1} People's Party results are compared to the combined totals of People's Alliance and People's Democratic Party–Valencian Centrists in the 1987 election.; ^{2} Within the United Left–Valencian People's Union alliance in the 1987 election.; ^{3} Left Platform results are compared to Republican Popular Unity totals in the 1987 election.

=== 1987 ===
Summary of the 10 June 1987 Corts Valencianes election results in Alicante
Parties and alliances	Popular vote			Seats	
Parties and alliances	Votes	%	±pp	Total	+/−
Spanish Socialist Workers' Party (PSOE)	262,409	42.63	–12.05	14	–3
People's Alliance (AP)^{1}	172,380	28.00	n/a	9	+3
Democratic and Social Centre (CDS)	88,234	14.33	+11.99	4	+4
United Left–Valencian People's Union (IU–UPV)^{2}	41,729	6.78	–1.58	2	±0
People's Democratic Party–Valencian Centrists (PDP–CV)^{1}	12,299	2.00	n/a	0	–2
The Greens (LV)	10,944	1.78	New	0	±0
Workers' Party of Spain–Communist Unity (PTE–UC)	8,007	1.30	New	0	±0
Valencian Union (UV)^{1}	4,927	0.80	n/a	0	–2
Valencian Electoral Coalition (CEV)	2,472	0.40	New	0	±0
Communist Unification of Spain (UCE)	1,610	0.26	New	0	±0
Republican Popular Unity (UPR)^{3}	1,324	0.22	±0.00	0	±0
Humanist Platform (PH)	1,215	0.20	New	0	±0
Valencian Nationalist Left (ENV–URV)	908	0.15	New	0	±0
Blank ballots	7,127	1.16	+0.46		
Total	615,585			29	±0
Valid votes	615,585	98.96	–0.09		
Invalid votes	6,483	1.04	+0.24		
Votes cast / turnout	622,068	72.59	+1.87		
Abstentions	234,918	27.41	–1.87		
Registered voters	856,986				
Sources
Footnotes: ^{1} Within the People's Coalition–Valencian Union alliance in the 1983 election.; ^{2} United Left–Valencian People's Union results are compared to the combined totals of Communist Party of the Valencian Country and Valencian People's Union in the 1983 election.; ^{3} Republican Popular Unity results are compared to Popular Struggle Coalition totals in the 1983 election.

=== 1983 ===
Summary of the 8 May 1983 Corts Valencianes election results in Alicante
Parties and alliances	Popular vote			Seats	
Parties and alliances	Votes	%	±pp	Total	+/−
Spanish Socialist Workers' Party (PSOE)	313,402	54.68	n/a	17	n/a
People's Coalition–Valencian Union (AP–PDP–UL–UV)	178,235	31.10	n/a	10	n/a
Communist Party of the Valencian Country (PCE–PCPV)	38,057	6.64	n/a	2	n/a
Democratic and Social Centre (CDS)	13,418	2.34	n/a	0	n/a
Liberal Democratic Party (PDL)	11,000	1.92	n/a	0	n/a
Valencian People's Union (UPV)	9,883	1.72	n/a	0	n/a
Workers' Socialist Party (PST)	3,885	0.68	n/a	0	n/a
Popular Struggle Coalition (CLP)	1,236	0.22	n/a	0	n/a
Blank ballots	4,018	0.70	n/a		
Total	573,134			29	n/a
Valid votes	573,134	99.20	n/a		
Invalid votes	4,619	0.80	n/a		
Votes cast / turnout	577,753	70.72	n/a		
Abstentions	239,230	29.28	n/a		
Registered voters	816,983				
