= 1983 Valencian regional election =

Election in the Spanish region of the Valencian Community

- 8 May 1983

All 89 seats in the Corts Valencianes 45 seats needed for a majority
- Opinion polls
- Registered: 2,654,967
- Turnout: 1,931,142 (72.7%)
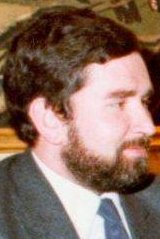

	First party	Second party	Third party
Leader	Joan Lerma	Manuel Giner	José Galán
Party	PSOE	AP–PDP–UL–UV	PCE–PCPV
Leader since	31 July 1979	December 1981	23 September 1980
Leader's seat	Valencia	Valencia	Alicante
Seats won	51	32	6
Popular vote	982,567	609,519	142,570
Percentage	51.4%	31.9%	7.5%
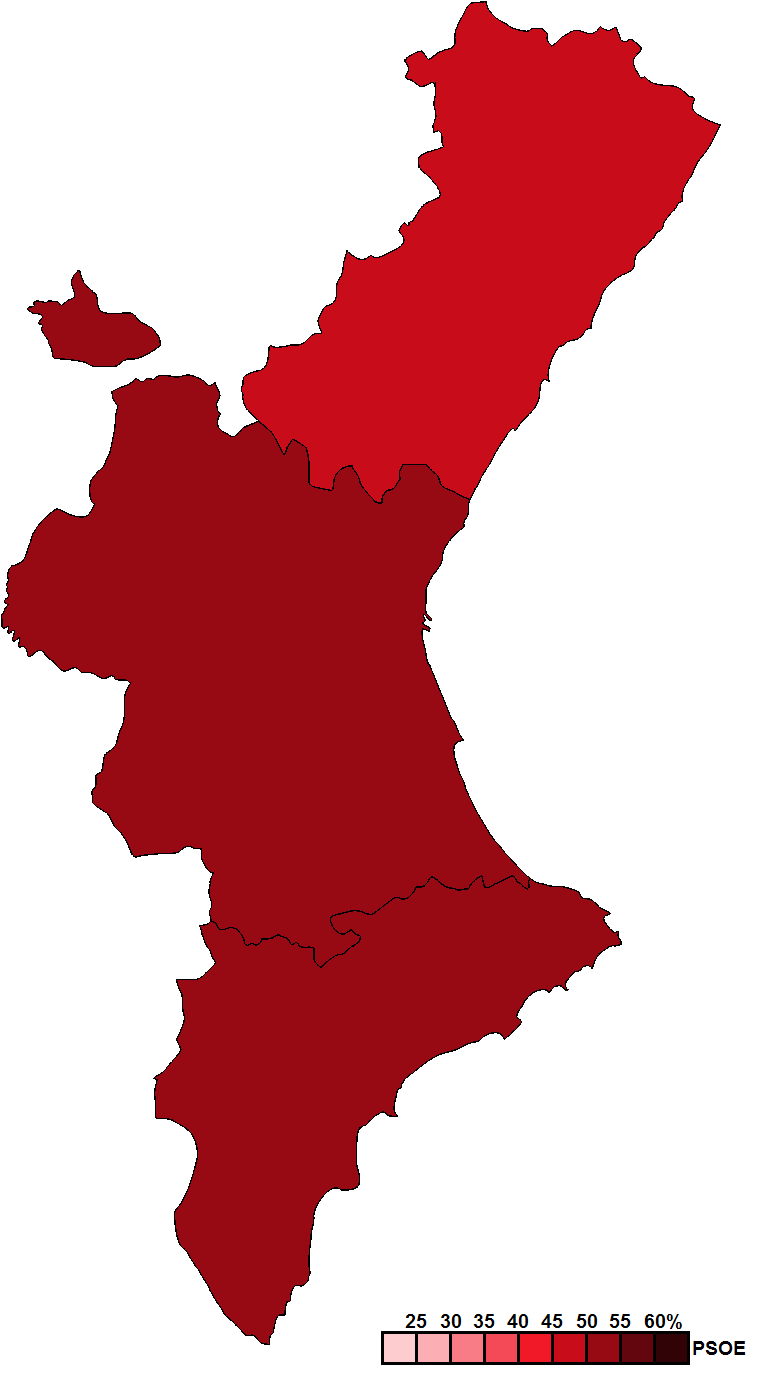
President before election
Joan Lerma
PSOE
President after election
Joan Lerma
PSOE

A regional election was held in the Valencian Community on 8 May 1983 to elect the 1st Corts of the autonomous community. All 89 seats in the Corts were up for election. It was held concurrently with regional elections in twelve other autonomous communities and local elections all across Spain.

The Spanish Socialist Workers' Party (PSOE) won the election with an absolute majority of 51 out of 89 seats and almost one million votes (51.4% of the vote). The People's Coalition, composed in the Valencian Community by the People's Alliance (AP), the People's Democratic Party (PDP), the Liberal Union and the Valencian Union (UV), became the second political force and the main opposition party in the Corts Valencianes with 32 seats. The Communist Party of Spain (PCE) managed to surpass the 5% regional threshold and entered the Corts with 6 seats, seeing a slight recovery from its results in the October 1982 general election.

As a result of the election, regional PSOE leader Joan Lerma became the first democratically elected president of the Valencian Government.

== Overview ==
Under the 1982 Statute of Autonomy, the Corts Valencianes were the unicameral legislature of the Valencian Community, having legislative power in devolved matters, as well as the ability to grant or withdraw confidence from a regional president. The electoral and procedural rules were supplemented by national law provisions (which were those used in the 1977 general election).

=== Date ===
The Council of the Valencian Country, in agreement with the Government of Spain and with the prior favorable vote of the Corts Valencianes during their transitional period, was required to call an election to the Corts within from 1 February to 31 May 1983.

The Corts Valencianes could not be dissolved before the expiration date of parliament.

The Corts Valencianes were officially dissolved on 10 March 1983 with the publication of the corresponding decree in the DOGV, setting election day for 8 May and scheduling for the chamber to reconvene on 7 June.

=== Electoral system ===
Voting for the Corts was based on universal suffrage, comprising all Spanish nationals over 18 years of age, registered in the Valencian Community and with full political rights.

The Corts Valencianes had 89 seats in their first election. All members were elected in three multi-member constituencies—corresponding to the provinces of Alicante, Castellón and Valencia, each of which was assigned a fixed number of seats—using the D'Hondt method and closed-list proportional voting, with a five percent-threshold of valid votes (including blank ballots) regionally.

As a result of the aforementioned allocation, each Corts constituency was entitled the following seats:

Seats	Constituencies
35	Valencia
29	Alicante
25	Castellón

The law did not provide for by-elections to fill vacant seats; instead, any vacancies arising after the proclamation of candidates and during the legislative term were filled by the next candidates on the party lists or, when required, by designated substitutes.

== Parties and candidates ==
The electoral law allowed for parties and federations registered in the interior ministry, alliances and groupings of electors to present lists of candidates. Parties and federations intending to form an alliance were required to inform the relevant electoral commission within fifteen days of the election call, whereas groupings of electors needed to secure the signature of at least one permille—and, in any case, 500 signatures—of the electorate in the constituencies for which they sought election, disallowing electors from signing for more than one list.

Below is a list of the main parties and alliances which contested the election:

Candidacy	Parties and alliances	Leading candidate	Ideology	Gov.	Ref.
PSOE	List: Spanish Socialist Workers' Party (PSOE)	Joan Lerma	Social democracy	Yes	
AP–PDP– UL–UV	List: People's Alliance (AP); People's Democratic Party (PDP); Liberal Union (UL); Valencian Union (UV)	Manuel Giner	Conservatism; Christian democracy	No	
PCE–PCPV	List: Communist Party of the Valencian Country (PCE–PCPV)	José Galán	Eurocommunism	Yes	

The electoral disaster of the Union of the Democratic Centre (UCD) in the October 1982 general election and the outcome of its extraordinary congress held in December, in which the party's leadership chose to transform the UCD into a christian democratic political force, brought the party to a process of virtual disintegration as many of its remaining members either switched party allegiances, split into new, independent candidacies or left politics altogether. Subsequent attempts to seek electoral allies ahead of the incoming 1983 local and regional elections, mainly the conservative People's Alliance (AP) and the christian democratic People's Democratic Party (PDP), had limited success due to concerns from both AP and UCD over such alliance policy: AP strongly rejected any agreement that implied any sort of global coalition with UCD due to the party's ongoing decomposition, and prospects about a possible PDP–UCD merger did not come into fruition because of the latter's reluctance to dilute its brand within another party. By the time the UCD's executive had voted for the liquidation of the party's mounting debts and its subsequent dissolution on 18 February 1983, electoral alliances with the AP–PDP coalition had only been agreed in some provinces of the Basque Country and Galicia.

Together with AP, the PDP had agreed to maintain their general election alliance—now rebranded as the People's Coalition—for the May local and regional elections, with the inclusion of the Liberal Union (UL), a political party created in January 1983 out of independents from the AP–PDP coalition in an attempt to appeal to former UCD liberal voters. The Coalition had seen its numbers soar from late February as a result of many former members from the UCD's christian democratic wing joining the PDP.

== Opinion polls ==
The table below lists voting intention estimates in reverse chronological order, showing the most recent first and using the dates when the survey fieldwork was done, as opposed to the date of publication. Where the fieldwork dates are unknown, the date of publication is given instead. The highest percentage figure in each polling survey is displayed with its background shaded in the leading party's colour. If a tie ensues, this is applied to the figures with the highest percentages. The "Lead" column on the right shows the percentage-point difference between the parties with the highest percentages in a poll. When available, seat projections determined by the polling organisations are displayed below (or in place of) the percentages in a smaller font; 45 seats were required for an absolute majority in the Corts Valencianes.

Polling firm/Commissioner	Fieldwork date	Sample size	Turnout	PSOE	AP–PDP–UL–UV	PCE–PCPV	CDS	Lead
1983 regional election	8 May 1983	—N/a	72.7	51.4; 51	31.9; 32	7.5; 6	1.9; 0	19.5
Sofemasa/El País	23–26 Apr 1983	?	?	? 62/67	? 23/26	–	–	?
1982 general election	28 Oct 1982	—N/a	84.0	53.1 (54)	29.1 (29)	4.6 (0)	2.5 (0)	24.0

== Results ==
=== Overall ===
Summary of the 8 May 1983 Corts Valencianes election results →
Parties and alliances	Popular vote			Seats	
Parties and alliances	Votes	%	±pp	Total	+/−
Spanish Socialist Workers' Party (PSOE)	982,567	51.41	n/a	51	n/a
People's Coalition–Valencian Union (AP–PDP–UL–UV)	609,519	31.89	n/a	32	n/a
Communist Party of the Valencian Country (PCE–PCPV)	142,570	7.46	n/a	6	n/a
Valencian People's Union (UPV)	58,712	3.07	n/a	0	n/a
Democratic and Social Centre (CDS)	36,015	1.88	n/a	0	n/a
Liberal Democratic Party (PDL)	29,788	1.56	n/a	0	n/a
Valencian Independent Organization (OIV)	12,585	0.66	n/a	0	n/a
Workers' Socialist Party (PST)	10,156	0.53	n/a	0	n/a
Valencian Nationalist Left (ENV–URV)	7,623	0.40	n/a	0	n/a
Spanish Communist Workers' Party (PCOE)	5,945	0.31	n/a	0	n/a
Popular Struggle Coalition (CLP)	2,586	0.14	n/a	0	n/a
Blank ballots	13,180	0.69	n/a		
Total	1,911,246			89	n/a
Valid votes	1,911,246	98.97	n/a		
Invalid votes	19,896	1.03	n/a		
Votes cast / turnout	1,931,142	72.74	n/a		
Abstentions	723,825	27.26	n/a		
Registered voters	2,654,967				

Popular vote
PSOE	51.41%
AP–PDP–UL–UV	31.89%
PCE–PCPV	7.46%
UPV	3.07%
CDS	1.88%
PDL	1.56%
Others	2.04%
Blank ballots	0.69%

Seats
PSOE	57.30%
AP–PDP–UL–UV	35.96%
PCE–PCPV	6.74%

=== Distribution by constituency ===
Constituency	PSOE		CP–UV		PCE–PV	
Constituency	%	S	%	S	%	S
Alicante	54.7	17	31.1	10	6.6	2
Castellón	49.1	14	34.1	10	5.6	1
Valencia	50.2	20	31.8	12	8.3	3
Total	51.4	51	31.9	32	7.5	6

== Aftermath ==
=== Government formation ===
Investiture
Candidate	Ballot →	6 June 1983	
Candidate	Required majority →	45 out of 89	
Joan Lerma (PSOE)	Yes: • PSOE (51)	51 / 89	check
Joan Lerma (PSOE)	No: • AP–PDP–UL–UV (32)	32 / 89	check
Joan Lerma (PSOE)	Abstentions: • PCPV (6)	6 / 89	check
Joan Lerma (PSOE)	Absentees	0 / 89	check
José Galán (PCPV)	Yes: • PCPV (6)	6 / 89	X mark
José Galán (PCPV)	No: • PSOE (51); • AP–PDP–UL–UV (32)	83 / 89	X mark
José Galán (PCPV)	Abstentions	0 / 89	X mark
José Galán (PCPV)	Absentees	0 / 89	X mark

== Bibliography ==
- Real Decreto-ley 20/1977, de 18 de marzo, sobre Normas Electorales (Royal Decree-Law 20/1977). Official State Gazette (in Spanish). 18 March 1977. BOE-A-1977-7445.
- Ley Orgánica 5/1982, de 1 de julio, de Estatuto de Autonomía de la Comunidad Valenciana (Organic Law 1/1982). Official State Gazette (in Spanish). 1 July 1982 [version as of 10 July 1982]. BOE-A-1982-17235.
- Decreto 29/1983, del Consell de la Generalitat Valenciana por el que se convocan elecciones a las Cortes Valencianas (PDF) (Decree 29/1983). Official Journal of the Valencian Government (in Spanish). 9 March 1983.
