= María Angels Ramón-Llin =

Spanish politician

María Angels Ramón-Llin i Martínez (born 15 June 1963 in Valencia, Spain) is a Spanish politician who belongs to the People's Party (PP).

Married with one son and daughter, Ramón-Llin holds a degree in law. She entered politics in 1982 when she joined Unió Valenciana (UV) a right wing regional party. She served as President of its youth wing from 1983 to 1991. In 1987 when she was elected as a UV deputy to the Corts Valencianes, the Valencian regional parliament, serving until 2004. During that period she served as Environment and Agriculture minister (1995-1997) and Minister for Agriculture, Fisheries and Food (1999-2003) in the Valencian regional administration She abandoned UV on 11 January 1999 and later joined the PP. In 2004 she moved to national politics when she was elected to the Spanish Congress of Deputies representing Valencia region for the PP. She did not stand in 2008 but remains a member of the Provincial committee of the PP in Valencia region.

Ramón-Llin also has a diploma in music and is a qualified teacher of Valencian.
