= Left Grouping of the Valencian Country =

Left Grouping of the Valencian Country Agrupament d'Esquerra del País Valencià
- Founded: 1982
- Dissolved: 1984
- Merger of: The nationalist sector of the Communist Party of the Valencian Country. Moderate sector of the Socialist Party of National Liberation. Independents.
- Succeeded by: Valencian People's Union
- Ideology: Valencian nationalism Socialism; Pancatalanism

Left Grouping of the Valencian Country (in Catalan: Agrupament d'Esquerra del País Valencià) was a political group created in 1982 out of a nationalist splinter-group of the Communist Party of the Valencian Country (PCPV), the 'possibilist' sector of the Socialist Party of National Liberation of the Catalan Countries (PSAN) and independent leftwing nationalists. AEPV was registered as a political party. Soon after its foundation AEPV initiated cooperation with the Nationalist Party of the Valencian Country (PNPV) and the Left Unity of the Valencian Country (UEPV), with whom AEPV founded the coalition Valencian People's Union (UPV).

Leading figures of AEPV were Gustau Muñoz and Ernest Garcia.

When UPV became a political party in 1984 AEPV was dissolved.
