= 1987 Valencian regional election =

Election in the Spanish region of the Valencian Community

- 10 June 1987

All 89 seats in the Corts Valencianes 45 seats needed for a majority
- Opinion polls
- Registered: 2,727,703 ▲2.7%
- Turnout: 2,030,881 (74.5%) ▲1.8 pp
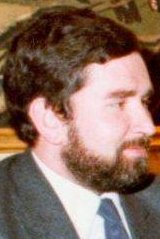

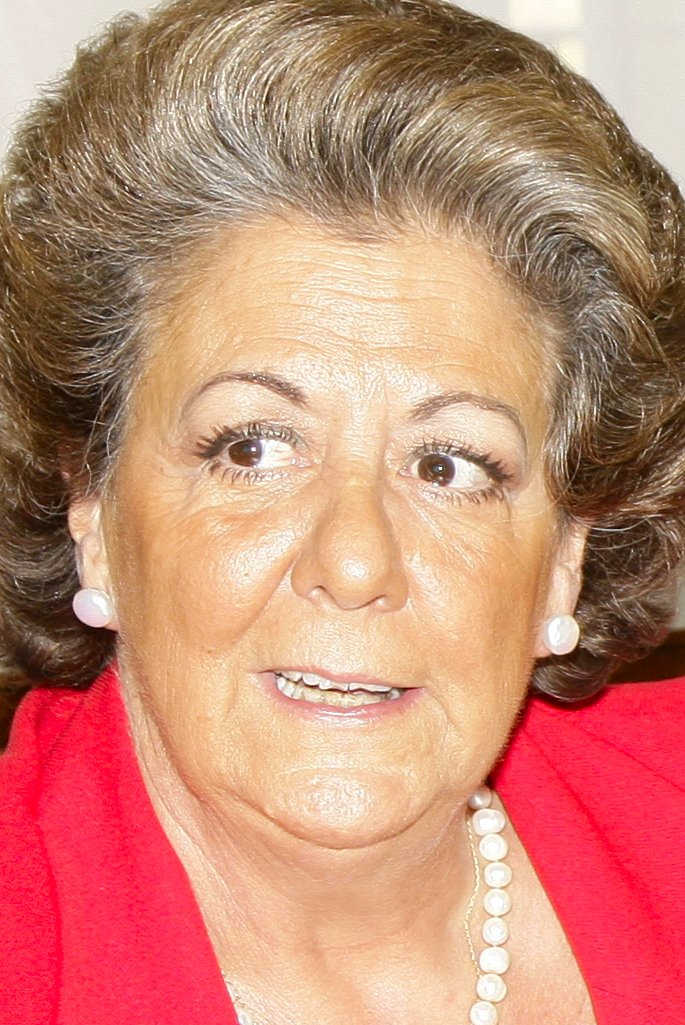

	First party	Second party	Third party
Leader	Joan Lerma	Rita Barberá	Pedro Gozalbo
Party	PSOE	AP	CDS
Leader since	31 July 1979	1987	1987
Leader's seat	Valencia	Valencia	Castellón
Last election	51 seats, 51.4%	20 seats (CP) (Note: Within the AP–PDP–UL–UV alliance in the 1983 election: AP (20 seats), PDP (6 seats), UV (5 seats) and UL/PL (1 seat).)	0 seats, 1.9%
Seats won	42	25	10
Seat change	▼9	▲5	▲10
Popular vote	828,961	476,099	225,663
Percentage	41.3%	23.7%	11.2%
Swing	▼10.1 pp	n/a	▲9.3 pp
	Fourth party	Fifth party
Leader	Filibert Crespo	Albert Taberner
Party	UV	IU–UPV
Leader since	1987	1986
Leader's seat	Valencia	Valencia
Last election	5 seats (CP)	6 seats, 10.5% (Note: Results for PCE–PCPV (7.5%, 6 seats) and UPV (3.1%, 0 seats) in the 1983 election.)
Seats won	6	6
Seat change	▲1	0
Popular vote	183,541	159,579
Percentage	9.1%	7.9%
Swing	n/a	▼2.6 pp
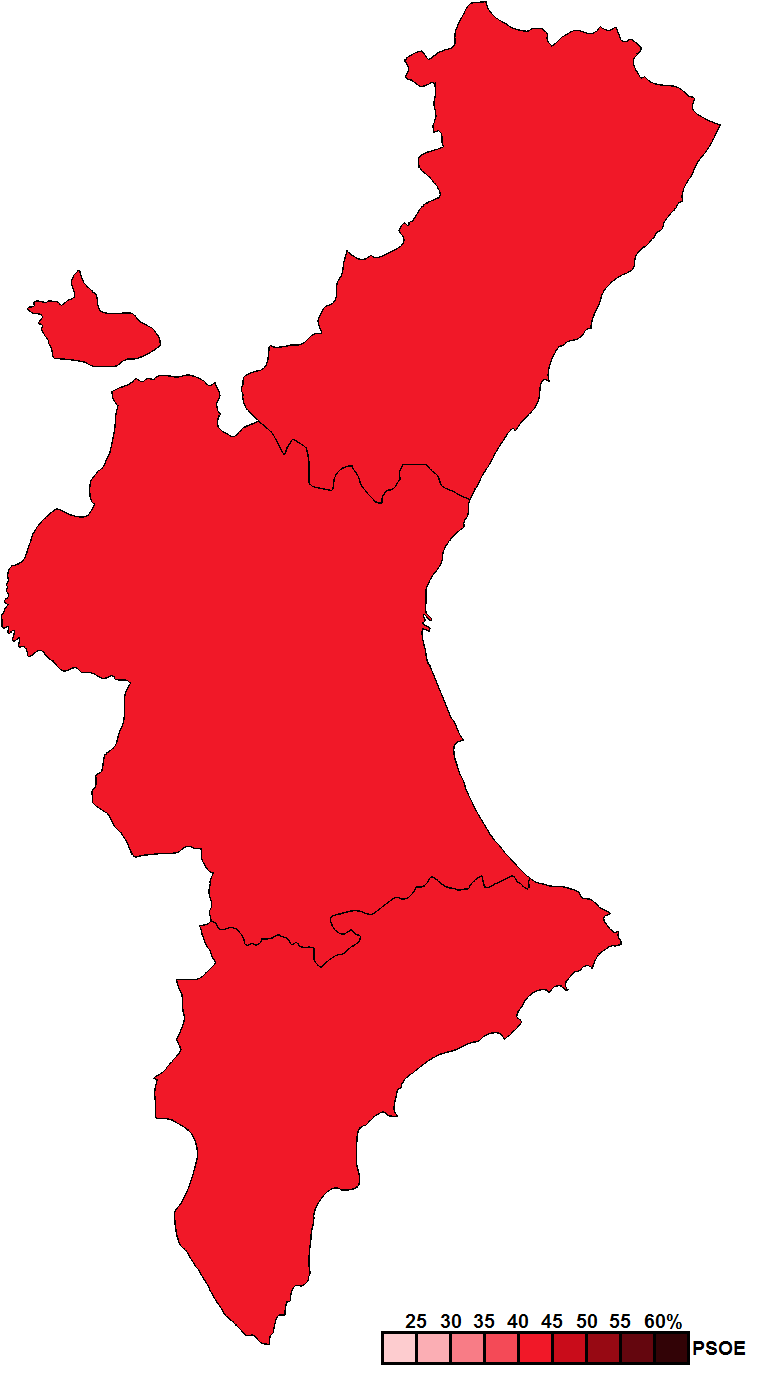
President before election
Joan Lerma
PSOE
Elected President
Joan Lerma
PSOE

A regional election was held in the Valencian Community on 10 June 1987 to elect the 2nd Corts of the autonomous community. All 89 seats in the Corts were up for election. It was held concurrently with regional elections in twelve other autonomous communities and local elections all across Spain, as well as the 1987 European Parliament election.

The Spanish Socialist Workers' Party (PSOE), suffering from a strong loss of popular support, lost 9 seats together with the absolute majority it had achieved in 1983. However, the PSOE remained as the largest party by a great margin due to the splitting up of the vote between the opposition parties. Incumbent President Joan Lerma was able to retain government thanks to the support of the IU-UPV alliance, and went on to form a minority government.

The People's Coalition had broken up after the 1986 general election. As a result, the People's Alliance (AP) and the People's Democratic Party (PDP) contested the election separately. AP, with future Mayoress of Valencia Rita Barberá as regional candidate, scored slightly less than 24% of the vote and lost 2 seats compared to the combined totals for the AP-PDP-UL coalition in 1983, while the PDP was swept out of the Corts entirely.

On the other hand, the election saw an increase of support for minor parties: Centrist Democratic and Social Centre (CDS) experienced a significant increase of its popular support and became the third political force in the region with over 10% of the share. The regionalist right-wing Valencian Union (UV), which ran separately for the first time, won 6 seats to the 5 it had obtained within the People's Coalition in 1983. The Communist Party of Spain (PCE), which had formed the electoral alliance United Left (IU) in April 1986 with other smaller left-wing parties across Spain, stood in coalition with the regional Valencian People's Unity (UPV) and won 6 seats.

== Overview ==
Under the 1982 Statute of Autonomy, the Corts Valencianes were the unicameral legislature of the Valencian Community, having legislative power in devolved matters, as well as the ability to grant or withdraw confidence from a regional president. The electoral and procedural rules were supplemented by national law provisions.

=== Date ===
The term of the Corts Valencianes expired four years after the date of their previous election. The election decree was required to be issued no later than 25 days before the scheduled expiration date of parliament and published on the following day in the Official Journal of the Valencian Government (DOGV), with election day taking place between 54 and 60 days after the decree's publication (and in any case within 60 days after the parliament's expiration). The previous election was held on 8 May 1983, which meant that the chamber's term would have expired on 8 May 1987. The election decree was required to be published in the DOGV no later than 14 April 1987, setting the latest possible date for election day on 13 June 1987.

The Corts Valencianes could not be dissolved before the expiration date of parliament.

The election to the Corts Valencianes was officially called on 14 April 1987 with the publication of the corresponding decree in the DOGV, setting election day for 10 June and scheduling for the chamber to reconvene on 2 July.

=== Electoral system ===
Voting for the Corts was based on universal suffrage, comprising all Spanish nationals over 18 years of age, registered in the Valencian Community and with full political rights, provided that they had not been deprived of the right to vote by a final sentence, nor were legally incapacitated.

The Corts Valencianes had a minimum of 75 and a maximum of 100 seats, with the electoral law fixing its size at 89. All were elected in three multi-member constituencies—corresponding to the provinces of Alicante, Castellón and Valencia, each of which was assigned an initial minimum of 20 seats and the remaining 29 distributed in proportion to population (with the seat-to-population ratio in any given province not exceeding three times that of any other)—using the D'Hondt method and closed-list proportional voting, with a five percent-threshold of valid votes (including blank ballots) regionally.

As a result of the aforementioned allocation, each Corts constituency was entitled the following seats:

Seats	Constituencies
37	Valencia^{(+2)}
29	Alicante
23	Castellón^{(−2)}

The law did not provide for by-elections to fill vacant seats; instead, any vacancies arising after the proclamation of candidates and during the legislative term were filled by the next candidates on the party lists or, when required, by designated substitutes.

=== Outgoing parliament ===
The table below shows the composition of the parliamentary groups in the chamber at the time of dissolution.

Parliamentary composition in April 1987
Groups	Parties	Legislators	
Groups	Parties	Seats	Total
Socialist Parliamentary Group	PSOE	51	51
People's Parliamentary Group	AP	19	19
Communist Parliamentary Group	PCPV	6	6
Mixed Group	PDP	5 (Note: José María de Andrés, José Antonio Bandrés, Emilio Bomant, Joaquín Galant and Vicente Pérez Devesa, former CP legislators.)	13
Mixed Group	UV	4 (Note: Manuel Campillos, Xavier Casp, Salvador Llácer and Joaquín Vidal, former CP legislators.)	13
Mixed Group	PL	2 (Note: Juan Marco Molines and Piedad Ortells, former CP legislators.)	13
Mixed Group	INDEP	2 (Note: Antonio Martínez Serrano and Antonio García Ágredas, former CP legislators.)	13

== Parties and candidates ==
The electoral law allowed for parties and federations registered in the interior ministry, alliances and groupings of electors to present lists of candidates. Parties and federations intending to form an alliance were required to inform the relevant electoral commission within 10 days of the election call, whereas groupings of electors needed to secure the signature of at least one percent of the electorate in the constituencies for which they sought election, disallowing electors from signing for more than one list.

Below is a list of the main parties and alliances which contested the election:

Candidacy	Parties and alliances	Leading candidate	Ideology	Previous result		Gov.	Ref.
Candidacy	Parties and alliances	Leading candidate	Ideology	Vote %	Seats	Gov.	Ref.
PSOE	List: Spanish Socialist Workers' Party (PSOE)	Joan Lerma	Social democracy	51.4%	51	Yes	
AP	List: People's Alliance (AP)	Rita Barberá	Conservatism; National conservatism	31.9%	32	No	
PDP	List: People's Democratic Party (PDP)	José María de Andrés	Christian democracy	31.9%	32	No	
UV	List: Valencian Union (UV)	Filibert Crespo	Blaverism; Conservatism	31.9%	32	No	
IU–UPV	List: Communist Party of the Valencian Country (PCPV); Valencian People's Union (UPV); Socialist Action Party (PASOC); Communist Party of the Peoples of Spain (PCPE); Progressive Federation (FP); Republican Left (IR)	Albert Taberner	Socialism; Valencian nationalism	10.5%	6	No	
CDS	List: Democratic and Social Centre (CDS)	Pedro Gozalbo	Centrism; Liberalism	1.9%	0	No	

== Opinion polls ==
The tables below list opinion polling results in reverse chronological order, showing the most recent first and using the dates when the survey fieldwork was done, as opposed to the date of publication. Where the fieldwork dates are unknown, the date of publication is given instead. The highest percentage figure in each polling survey is displayed with its background shaded in the leading party's colour. If a tie ensues, this is applied to the figures with the highest percentages. The "Lead" column on the right shows the percentage-point difference between the parties with the highest percentages in a poll.

=== Voting intention estimates ===
The table below lists weighted voting intention estimates. Refusals are generally excluded from the party vote percentages, while question wording and the treatment of "don't know" responses and those not intending to vote may vary between polling organisations. When available, seat projections determined by the polling organisations are displayed below (or in place of) the percentages in a smaller font; 45 seats were required for an absolute majority in the Corts Valencianes.

Polling firm/Commissioner	Fieldwork date	Sample size	Turnout	PSOE	AP–PDP–PL	IU	UPV	CDS	UV	AP	PDP	EU–UPV	Lead
1987 regional election	10 Jun 1987	—N/a	74.5	41.3; 42	–	(Note: Within IU–UPV.)		11.2; 10	9.1; 6	23.7; 25	1.0; 0	7.9; 6	17.6
Demoscopia/El País	22–26 May 1987	?	74	42.2; 43	–			12.7; 11	4.8; 0	26.8; 30	0.7; 0	7.4; 5	15.4
Sofemasa/AP	16 Apr 1987	?	?	35.3	–	5.9	–	13.7	5.9	23.5	3.9	–	11.8
1986 general election	22 Jun 1986	—N/a	76.4	47.5 (49)	28.8 (32)	4.7 (0)	1.9 (0)	8.8 (8)	3.1 (0)	(Note: Within AP–PDP–UL–UV/AP–PDP–PL.)		–	18.7
1983 regional election	8 May 1983	—N/a	72.7	51.4; 51	31.9; 32	7.5 (Note: Results for PCE–PCPV in the 1983 election.); 6	3.1; 0	1.9; 0				–	19.5

== Results ==
=== Overall ===
← Summary of the 10 June 1987 Corts Valencianes election results →
Parties and alliances	Popular vote			Seats	
Parties and alliances	Votes	%	±pp	Total	+/−
Spanish Socialist Workers' Party (PSOE)	828,961	41.28	−10.13	42	−9
People's Alliance (AP)^{1}	476,099	23.71	n/a	25	+5
Democratic and Social Centre (CDS)	225,663	11.24	+9.36	10	+10
Valencian Union (UV)^{1}	183,541	9.14	n/a	6	+1
United Left–Valencian People's Union (IU–UPV)^{2}	159,579	7.95	−2.58	6	±0
Workers' Party of Spain–Communist Unity (PTE–UC)	33,770	1.68	New	0	±0
The Greens (LV)	22,262	1.11	New	0	±0
People's Democratic Party–Valencian Centrists (PDP–CV)^{1}	20,171	1.00	n/a	0	−6
Valencian Electoral Coalition (CEV)	11,984	0.60	New	0	±0
Spanish Vertex Ecological Development Revindication (VERDE)	5,056	0.25	New	0	±0
Communist Unification of Spain (UCE)	4,325	0.22	New	0	±0
Valencian Nationalist Left (ENV–URV)	4,175	0.21	−0.19	0	±0
Humanist Platform (PH)	3,658	0.18	New	0	±0
Republican Popular Unity (UPR)^{3}	3,309	0.16	+0.02	0	±0
Left Front (FI)	2,295	0.11	New	0	±0
Internationalist Socialist Workers' Party (POSI)	1,884	0.09	New	0	±0
Liberal Party (PL)^{1}	n/a	n/a	n/a	0	−1
Blank ballots	21,497	1.07	+0.38		
Total	2,008,229			89	±0
Valid votes	2,008,229	98.88	−0.09		
Invalid votes	22,652	1.12	+0.09		
Votes cast / turnout	2,030,881	74.45	+1.71		
Abstentions	696,822	25.55	−1.71		
Registered voters	2,727,703				
Sources
Footnotes: ^{1} Within the People's Coalition–Valencian Union alliance in the 1983 election.; ^{2} United Left–Valencian People's Union results are compared to the combined totals of Communist Party of the Valencian Country and Valencian People's Union in the 1983 election.; ^{3} Republican Popular Unity results are compared to Popular Struggle Coalition totals in the 1983 election.

Popular vote
PSOE	41.28%
AP	23.71%
CDS	11.24%
UV	9.14%
IU–UPV	7.95%
PTE–UC	1.68%
LV	1.11%
PDP–CV	1.00%
Others	1.83%
Blank ballots	1.07%

Seats
PSOE	47.19%
AP	28.09%
CDS	11.24%
UV	6.74%
IU–UPV	6.74%

=== Distribution by constituency ===
Constituency	PSOE		AP		CDS		UV		IU–UPV	
Constituency	%	S	%	S	%	S	%	S	%	S
Alicante	42.6	14	28.0	9	14.3	4	0.8	−	6.8	2
Castellón	40.9	11	30.7	8	11.5	3	3.1	−	5.5	1
Valencia	40.6	17	19.9	8	9.5	3	14.9	6	9.1	3
Total	41.3	42	23.7	25	11.2	10	9.1	6	7.9	6

== Aftermath ==
=== Government formation ===
Investiture
Candidate	Ballot →	21 July 1987	
Candidate	Required majority →	45 out of 89	
Joan Lerma (PSOE)	Yes: • PSOE (42); • IU–UPV (6)	48 / 89	check
Joan Lerma (PSOE)	No: • AP (25)	25 / 89	check
Joan Lerma (PSOE)	Abstentions: • CDS (10)	10 / 89	check
Joan Lerma (PSOE)	Absentees: • UV (6)	6 / 89	check
Rita Barberá (AP)	Yes: • AP (25)	25 / 89	X mark
Rita Barberá (AP)	No: • PSOE (42); • CDS (10); • IU–UPV (6)	58 / 89	X mark
Rita Barberá (AP)	Abstentions	0 / 89	X mark
Rita Barberá (AP)	Absentees: • UV (6)	6 / 89	X mark

== Bibliography ==
- Ley Orgánica 5/1982, de 1 de julio, de Estatuto de Autonomía de la Comunidad Valenciana (Organic Law 1/1982). Official State Gazette (in Spanish). 1 July 1982 [version as of 10 July 1982]. BOE-A-1982-17235.
- Ley 5/1983, de 30 de diciembre, de Gobierno Valenciano (Law 5/1983). Official State Gazette (in Spanish). 30 December 1983 [version as of 30 December 1983]. BOE-A-1984-3460.
- Ley Orgánica 5/1985, de 19 de junio, del Régimen Electoral General (Organic Law 5/1985). Official State Gazette (in Spanish). 19 June 1985 [version as of 3 April 1987]. BOE-A-1985-11672.
- Ley 1/1987, de 31 de marzo, Electoral Valenciana (Law 1/1987). Official State Gazette (in Spanish). 31 March 1987 [version as of 6 April 1987]. BOE-A-1987-9636.
- Decreto 16/1987, de 13 de abril, del Presidente de la Generalitat Valenciana, de convocatoria de elecciones a las Cortes Valencianas (PDF) (Decree 16/1987). Official Journal of the Valencian Government (in Spanish). 13 April 1987.
