= Valencian State-Valencian Sovereignty =

Valencian political party

Valencian State-Valencian Sovereignty Estat Valencià-Sobirania Valenciana
- President: Joan Sorribes
- Founded: 2006
- Headquarters: València
- Newspaper: La Crida
- Ideology: Valencian nationalism Left-wing nationalism Socialism; Valencian independence Republicanism
- Political position: Left-wing
- National affiliation: Compromís (only at the local level)
- Local representatives (Valencian Community): 1 / 5,784

Party flag

Website
- estatvalencia.blogspot.com.es

Valencian State-Valencian Sovereignty (Catalan: Estat Valencià-Sobirania Valenciana, EV) is a left-wing valencian nationalist political party founded in the Valencian Community in 2006 in Alfafar. Between March 2013 and June 2017 EV was part of the coalition Compromís, participating in the internal current "Left-wing Independentist Pole". EV members continue to be part of local collectives of Compromís.

== Objectives and ideology ==
The main objective of EV is the creation of an independent Valencian Republic, based in democratic, social and ecologic principles. EV recognizes the unity of the Catalan language, but rejects the idea of the Catalan Countries.

== History ==
In the 2008 general elections EV joined the coalition For the Valencian Republic, along with Valencian Nationalist Left and Valencian Republic-European Valencian Party, obtaining 645 votes (0.02%). The party attempted to form an alliance with other small independentist groups of the Valencian Community, Aragón and Catalonia to run for the European elections of 2009, but the alliance failed to gather enough signatures.

In the local elections of 2011 Joan Sorribes, the leader of the party, was elected as the main candidate (first in the list) of Compromís in the municipality of Alfafar, obtaining 440 votes (4.43% of the total vote), slightly below the 5% electoral threshold. In 2013 Sorribes received death threats due to his political activities. EV joined Compromís officially in 2013. Sorribes was elected as a town councillor in Alfafar in the local elections of 2015.

In 2015 EV, along Valencian Left and EV created the Left-wing Independentist Pole as an organized current inside Compromís. Finally, in 2017, EV left the national structures of Compromís, but remained active in the local groups of the coalition.
