= Valencian People's Union =

Valencian People's Union Unitat del Poble Valencià
- Spokesperson: Pere Mayor i Penadés; Josep Lluís Blasco
- Founded: 1982 (as an alliance); 1984 (as a party)
- Dissolved: 1998
- Merger of: Left Grouping of the Valencian Country; Nationalist Party of the Valencian Country
- Succeeded by: Valencian Nationalist Bloc
- Ideology: Valencian nationalism Socialism
- Corts Valencianes (1987-1991): 2 / 89
- Town councillors (1995-1998): 168 / 5,352

The Valencian People's Union (in Valencian: Unitat del Poble Valencià, UPV) was a political alliance created in 1982 when the Left Grouping of the Valencian Country (AEPV) and the Nationalist Party of the Valencian Country (PNPV) merged to contest the 1982 general election. In 1983, the United Left of the Valencian Country joined the coalition to contest the 1983 regional election. In 1984, AEPV and PNPV became a unified party.

== Electoral performance ==
=== Corts Valencianes ===
Date	Votes			Seats		Status	Size	Notes
Date	#	%	±pp	#	±	Status	Size	Notes
1983	58,712	3.1%	—	0 / 89	—	N/A	4th	
1987*	159,579	7.9%	+4.8	2 / 89	2	Opposition	5th	government support
1991	73,813	3.7%	–4.2	0 / 89	2	N/A	6th	
1995**	64,253	2.7%	–1.0	0 / 89	0	N/A	5th	

- * In coalition with United Left of the Valencian Country.
- ** In coalition with Nationalist Bloc.

=== Cortes Generales ===
==== Valencian Community ====
Congress of Deputies
Date	Votes			Seats		Status	Size
Date	#	%	±pp	#	±	Status	Size
1982	18,516	0.9%	+0.1	0 / 29	0	N/A	7th
1986	40,264	1.9%	+1.0	0 / 31	0	N/A	6th
1989	40,767	1.9%	±0.0	0 / 31	0	N/A	6th
1993	41,052	1.7%	–0.2	0 / 31	0	N/A	5th
1996*	26,777	1.0%	–0.7	0 / 32	0	N/A	5th

Senate
Date	Seats		Size
Date	#	±	Size
1982	0 / 12	0	15th
1986	0 / 12	0	6th
1989	0 / 12	0	6th
1993	0 / 12	0	5th
1996*	0 / 12	0	5th

- * In coalition with Nationalist Bloc.
