= Valencian Nationalist Left =

Valencian Nationalist Left Esquerra Nacionalista Valenciana
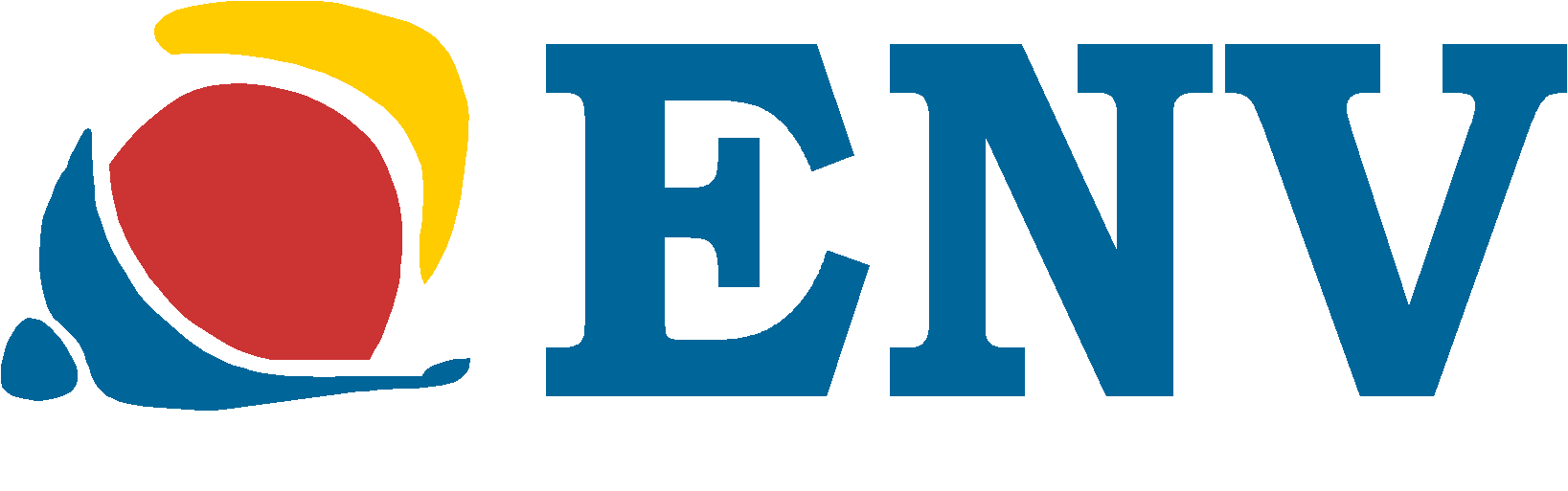
- President: Josep Velasco Santamaría
- Secretary-General: Albert Marín Sanchis
- Founded: 1979
- Headquarters: Valencia
- Ideology: Valencian nationalism Left-wing nationalism Progressivism; Valencian independence Republicanism; Former: Anti-Catalanism; Blaverism
- Political position: Left-wing

Party flag

Website
- www.esquerranacionalista.org

Valencian Nationalist Left (Catalan: Esquerra Nacionalista Valenciana, ENV) is a left-wing valencian nationalist political party founded in the Valencian Community in 1979, as a refoundation of the previous Valencian Regional Union.

== History ==
The party was founded by left-wing faction of Valencian Regional Union (URV) in its 1st congress (October 1979), as a refoundation of that party. The right-wing faction of URV founded a new party called Valencian Union (UV).

In the decade of the 1980s, the party founded an editorial with the name Editorial Nova Valéncia (ENV), that published several titles related to Valencian nationalism. The book that had the greatest impact was Bases per al Nacionalisme Valencià (Bases for Valencian nationalism in 1986). This book had the objective of contributing to establish the bases and the theory of Valencian nationalism at the end of the 20th century.

ENV never had any big electoral success, with the anti-catalanist political space already being occupied by UV. In the II Extraordinary Congress of ENV, held in 1990, the party entered a state of hibernation as a result of its limited electoral results. A couple of years later the party was reactivated, following the affiliation of Miquel Ramon i Quiles (senator expelled from UV) and Francesc Martínez León (member of the City Council of Valencia).

In 1993 ENV started to cooperate with the Nationalist Valencian Party (PVN). Since that year ENV abandoned its most extreme anti-Catalan stances, recognizing the unity of the Valencian–Catalan language, for example.

In 1989 ENV participated in the European Parliament elections with a single candidate, integrated in the list of Valencian Union.

In the Valencian elections of 2007 ENV participated, along with Valencian Nationalist Option, in the United for Valencia (UxV) coalition. In the Spanish general elections of 2008 the party was part of the coalition For the Valencian Republic, along with other two parties: Valencian State-Valencian Sovereignty and Valencian Republic-European Valencian Party.

== Elections ==
| Election | Votes | Vote % |
|---|---|---|
| Spanish general election, 1982 | 6,738 | 0.32% |
| Valencian regional election, 1983 | 7,623 | 0.40% |
| Spanish municipal elections, 1983 | 46 | 0.0% |
| Spanish general election, 1986 | 2,116 | 0.1% |
| Valencian regional election, 1987 | 4,175 | 0.21% |
| Spanish general election, 1989 | 2,098 | 0.1% |
| Spanish general election, 1993 | 1,517 | 0.06% |
| Valencian regional election, 1995 | 1,861 | 0.08% |
| Spanish general election, 1996 | 1,023 | 0.04% |
| Valencian regional election, 1999 | 2,070 | 0.09% |
| Spanish general election, 2000 | 920 | 0.04% |

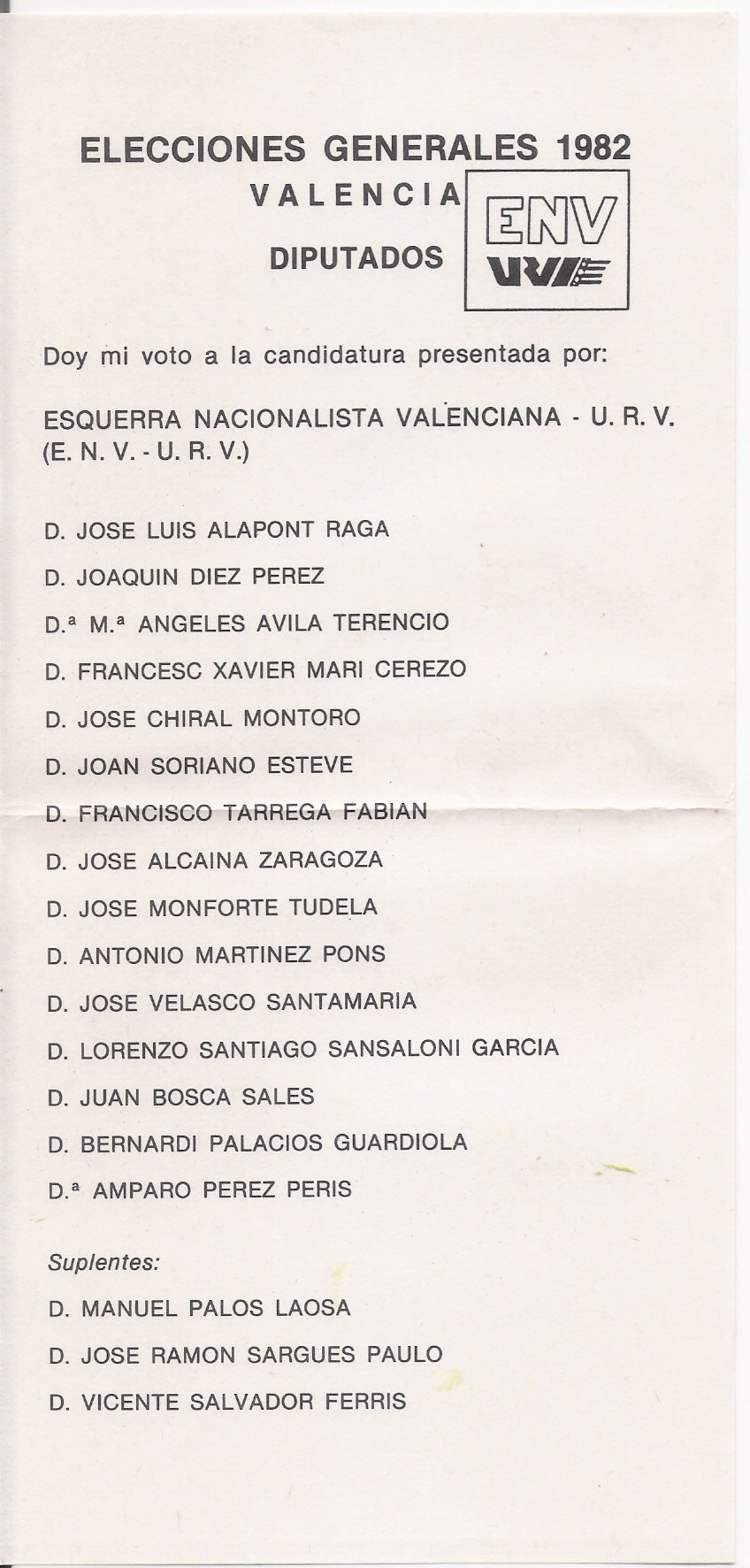
Generales 1982.

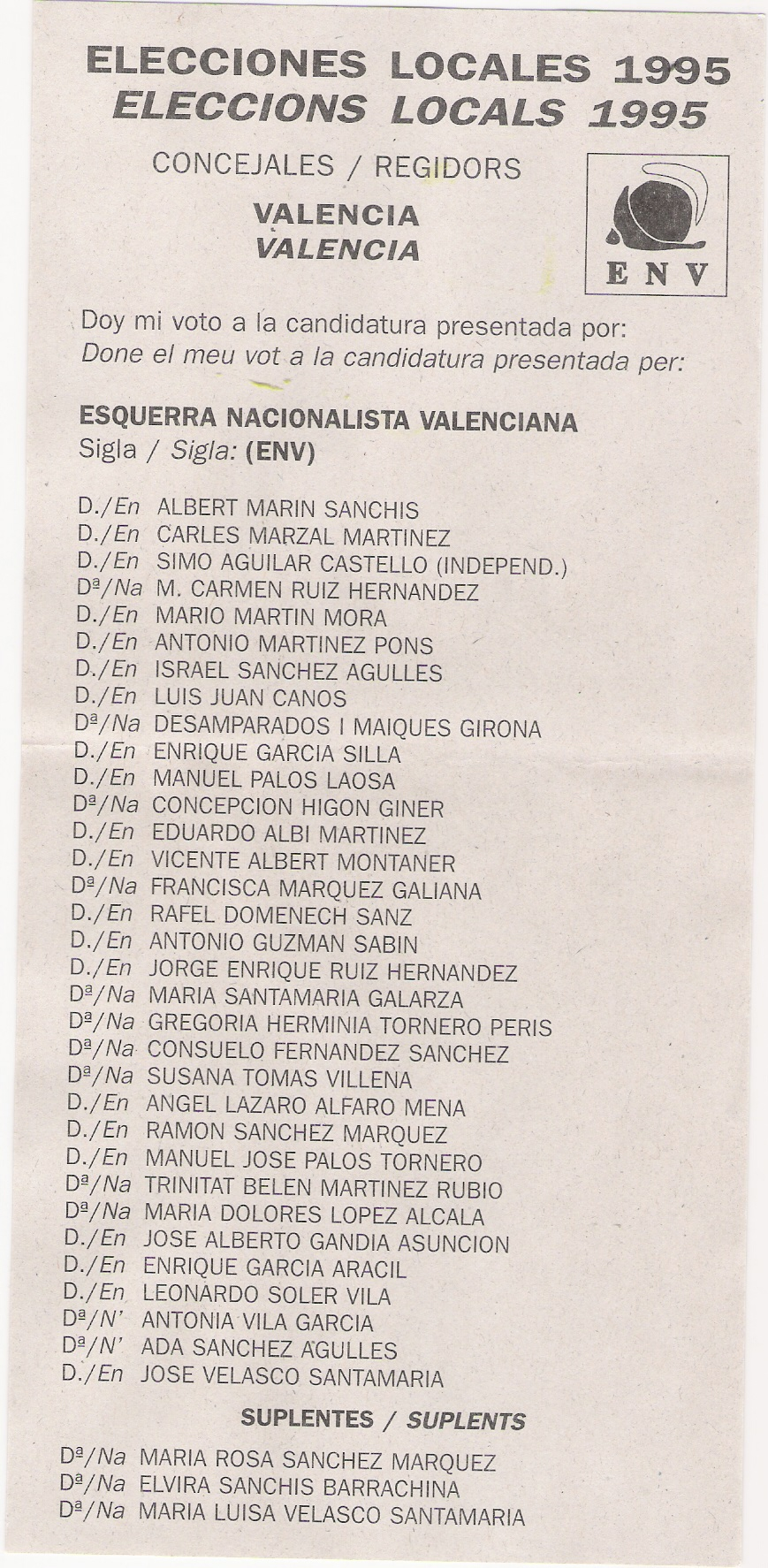
Locales 1995.

== See also ==
- Blaverism
- Valencian Union
