= Communist Party of the Valencian Country =

Communist Party of the Valencian Country Partit Comunista del País Valencià
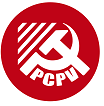
- President: Javier Parra
- Founded: 2000
- Headquarters: Valencia, Spain
- Membership (2013): 743
- Ideology: Communism; Marxism; Republicanism
- Political position: Far-left
- National affiliation: Communist Party of Spain
- Regional affiliation: United Left of the Valencian Country
- Congreso de los Diputados Valencian seats.: 1 / 33

Website
- www.pcpv.es

The Communist Party of the Valencian Country (Valencian: Partit Comunista del País Valencià, Spanish: Partido Comunista del País Valenciano) is a Spanish communist political party, acting as the federation of the Communist Party of Spain (PCE) in the Valencian Community. As such, it is a component party of the United Left of the Valencian Country group.

The PCPV was constituted in 1976, a year after the death of Francisco Franco, during the Spanish transition to democracy. Its first general secretary was Antonio Palomares, a communist leader who had fought against Francoist Spain. In its First Congress in 1979, the PCPV elected Ernest García as its general secretary. Nevertheless, García was in minority in the Executive Board, and had to resign, being replaced by José Galán until the 3rd Congress, which elected Juan Villalba as general secretary. As Villalba stood by Santiago Carrillo when the latter left the PCE, the PCE leadership requested the summoning of a 4th PCPV Congress in 1985, one which elected Pedro Zamora as general secretary in a vote that excluded Carrillo's followers.

After the fall of the Soviet Union, some members of the PCE stood for its dissolution and the conversion of the United Left (IU) coalition into a new political party. In this context, at 1992 the 6th Congress of the PCPV elected a new leadership headed by Joan Ribó. Joan Ribó was elected general coordinator of the United Left of the Valencian Country (EUPV) in 1998, being replaced by Alfred Botella as the general coordinator of the PCPV. Botella was re-elected at the 8th (in 2000) and 9th (2002) Congresses.

PCPV sticker from 1977

At 2005, during a conflict inside the IU, Botella resigned and the leadership of the PCPV convoked an extraordinary 10th Congress, which elected a new leadership that unanimously voted for Marga Sanz as general secretary.
