= Results of the 2004 Spanish Congress election =

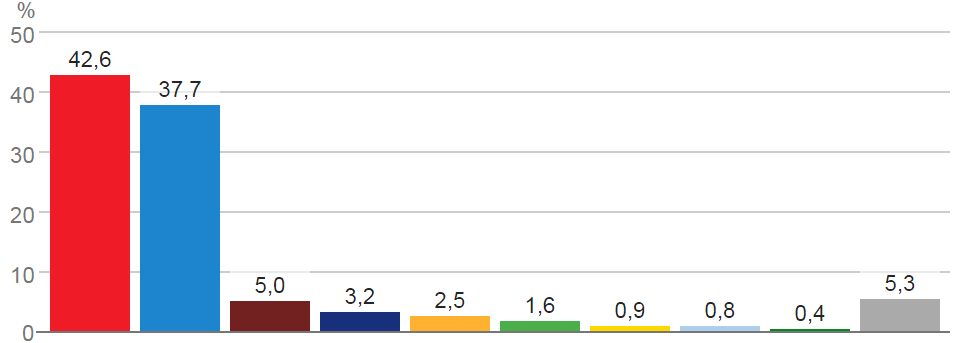
| (Spain) | Main: 2004 Spanish general election |
← 2000 14 March 2004 2008 →
| Party | | Votes | % | Seats |
| | PSOE | 11,026,163 | 42.6% | 164 |
| | PP | 9,763,144 | 37.7% | 148 |
| | IU | 1,284,081 | 5.0% | 5 |
| | CiU | 835,471 | 3.2% | 10 |
| | ERC | 652,196 | 2.5% | 8 |
| | EAJ/PNV | 420,980 | 1.6% | 7 |
| | CC | 235,221 | 0.9% | 3 |
| | BNG | 208,688 | 0.8% | 2 |
| | CHA | 94,252 | 0.4% | 1 |
| | Others | 1,371,103 | 5.3% | 2 |
| Total | | 25,891,299 | 100.0% | 350 |

This article presents the results breakdown of the election to the Congress of Deputies held in Spain on 14 March 2004. The following tables show detailed results in each of the country's 17 autonomous communities and in the autonomous cities of Ceuta and Melilla, as well as a summary of constituency and regional results.

== Nationwide ==
← Summary of the 14 March 2004 Congress of Deputies election results →
| Parties and alliances | Popular vote | | | Seats | |
| Parties and alliances | Votes | % | ±pp | Total | +/− |
|---|---|---|---|---|---|
| Spanish Socialist Workers' Party (PSOE) | 11,026,163 | 42.59 | +8.42 | 164 | +39 |
| People's Party (PP) | 9,763,144 | 37.71 | −6.81 | 148 | −35 |
| United Left (IU)^{2} | 1,284,081 | 4.96 | −0.93 | 5 | −4 |
| Convergence and Union (CiU) | 835,471 | 3.23 | −0.96 | 10 | −5 |
| Republican Left of Catalonia (ERC) | 652,196 | 2.52 | +1.68 | 8 | +7 |
| Basque Nationalist Party (EAJ/PNV)^{3} | 420,980 | 1.63 | +0.13 | 7 | ±0 |
| Canarian Coalition (CC) | 235,221 | 0.91 | −0.16 | 3 | −1 |
| Galician Nationalist Bloc (BNG) | 208,688 | 0.81 | −0.51 | 2 | −1 |
| Andalusian Party (PA) | 181,868 | 0.70 | −0.19 | 0 | −1 |
| Aragonese Union (CHA) | 94,252 | 0.36 | +0.03 | 1 | ±0 |
| Basque Solidarity (EA)^{3} | 80,905 | 0.31 | −0.06 | 1 | ±0 |
| The Eco-pacifist Greens (LVEP) | 68,027 | 0.26 | +0.16 | 0 | ±0 |
| The Eco-pacifist Greens (LVEP) | 37,499 | 0.14 | +0.04 | 0 | ±0 |
| The Greens–The Ecologist Alternative (EV–AE) | 30,528 | 0.12 | New | 0 | ±0 |
| Navarre Yes (NaBai)^{4} | 61,045 | 0.24 | +0.15 | 1 | +1 |
| Valencian Nationalist Bloc–Green Left (Bloc–EV) | 40,759 | 0.16 | −0.09 | 0 | ±0 |
| Progressives for the Balearic Islands (PSM–EN, EU, EV, ER)^{5} | 40,289 | 0.16 | −0.06 | 0 | ±0 |
| Citizens for Blank Votes (CenB) | 40,208 | 0.16 | New | 0 | ±0 |
| Aralar–Stand up (Aralar–Zutik) | 38,560 | 0.15 | New | 0 | ±0 |
| Aragonese Party (PAR) | 36,540 | 0.14 | −0.03 | 0 | ±0 |
| Democratic and Social Centre (CDS) | 34,101 | 0.13 | +0.03 | 0 | ±0 |
| Socialist Party of Andalusia (PSA) | 24,127 | 0.09 | New | 0 | ±0 |
| Humanist Party (PH) | 21,758 | 0.08 | ±0.00 | 0 | ±0 |
| The Greens of the Community of Madrid (LVCM) | 19,600 | 0.08 | −0.01 | 0 | ±0 |
| Republican Left (IR) | 16,993 | 0.07 | New | 0 | ±0 |
| Cannabis Party for Legalization and Normalization (PCLyN) | 16,918 | 0.07 | New | 0 | ±0 |
| Family and Life Party (PFyV) | 16,699 | 0.06 | New | 0 | ±0 |
| The Greens (Verdes) | 15,220 | 0.06 | ±0.00 | 0 | ±0 |
| The Greens of the Region of Murcia (LVRM) | 7,074 | 0.03 | ±0.00 | 0 | ±0 |
| The Greens of Asturias (Verdes) | 5,013 | 0.02 | ±0.00 | 0 | ±0 |
| The Greens of Extremadura (LV) | 3,133 | 0.01 | ±0.00 | 0 | ±0 |
| National Democracy (DN) | 15,180 | 0.06 | New | 0 | ±0 |
| Leonese People's Union (UPL) | 14,160 | 0.05 | −0.13 | 0 | ±0 |
| Communist Party of the Peoples of Spain (PCPE) | 12,979 | 0.05 | −0.01 | 0 | ±0 |
| The Greens–Green Group (LV–GV) | 12,749 | 0.05 | −0.04 | 0 | ±0 |
| Spanish Phalanx of the CNSO (FE de las JONS)^{6} | 12,266 | 0.05 | +0.02 | 0 | ±0 |
| Majorcan Union (UM) | 10,558 | 0.04 | ±0.00 | 0 | ±0 |
| The Phalanx (FE) | 10,311 | 0.04 | −0.02 | 0 | ±0 |
| Commoners' Land–Castilian Nationalist Party (TC–PNC) | 8,866 | 0.03 | −0.05 | 0 | ±0 |
| Internationalist Socialist Workers' Party (POSI) | 8,003 | 0.03 | −0.02 | 0 | ±0 |
| Republican Social Movement (MSR) | 6,768 | 0.03 | New | 0 | ±0 |
| Spanish Democratic Party (PADE) | 5,677 | 0.02 | −0.02 | 0 | ±0 |
| Convergence of Democrats of Navarre (CDN) | 5,573 | 0.02 | −0.02 | 0 | ±0 |
| Authentic Phalanx (FA) | 4,589 | 0.02 | New | 0 | ±0 |
| Asturianist Party (PAS) | 4,292 | 0.02 | −0.01 | 0 | ±0 |
| Spain 2000 (E–2000) | 4,231 | 0.02 | −0.02 | 0 | ±0 |
| Canarian Nationalist Party (PNC) | 4,092 | 0.02 | New | 0 | ±0 |
| United Extremadura (EU) | 3,916 | 0.02 | ±0.00 | 0 | ±0 |
| Party of Self-employed and Professionals (AUTONOMO) | 3,124 | 0.01 | −0.01 | 0 | ±0 |
| Initiative for the Development of Soria (IDES) | 2,934 | 0.01 | New | 0 | ±0 |
| Andalusia Assembly (A) | 2,930 | 0.01 | ±0.00 | 0 | ±0 |
| Canarian Popular Alternative (APCa) | 2,715 | 0.01 | New | 0 | ±0 |
| European Green Group (GVE) | 2,662 | 0.01 | New | 0 | ±0 |
| Independent Candidacy–The Party of Castile and León (CI–PCL) | 2,421 | 0.01 | −0.01 | 0 | ±0 |
| Unsubmissive Seats–Alternative of Discontented Democrats (Ei–ADD) | 2,332 | 0.01 | New | 0 | ±0 |
| Party of the Democratic Karma (PKD) | 2,300 | 0.01 | ±0.00 | 0 | ±0 |
| Galician People's Front (FPG) | 2,257 | 0.01 | ±0.00 | 0 | ±0 |
| Galician Coalition (CG) | 2,235 | 0.01 | ±0.00 | 0 | ±0 |
| Alliance for Development and Nature (ADN) | 2,215 | 0.01 | New | 0 | ±0 |
| Party of Precarious Workers (PTPRE) | 2,115 | 0.01 | New | 0 | ±0 |
| Kingdom of Valencia Identity (IRV) | 2,111 | 0.01 | New | 0 | ±0 |
| Party of Self-employed, Retirees and Widows (PAE) | 2,082 | 0.01 | ±0.00 | 0 | ±0 |
| Andecha Astur (AA) | 1,970 | 0.01 | ±0.00 | 0 | ±0 |
| Union of the Salamancan People (UPSa) | 1,871 | 0.01 | New | 0 | ±0 |
| The Greens–Green Alternative (EV–AV) | 1,836 | 0.01 | −0.04 | 0 | ±0 |
| Carlist Party (PC) | 1,813 | 0.01 | ±0.00 | 0 | ±0 |
| Romantic Mutual Support Party (PMAR) | 1,561 | 0.01 | New | 0 | ±0 |
| Cantabrian Nationalist Council (CNC) | 1,431 | 0.01 | ±0.00 | 0 | ±0 |
| Salamanca–Zamora–León–PREPAL (PREPAL) | 1,322 | 0.01 | ±0.00 | 0 | ±0 |
| Another Democracy is Possible (ODeP) | 1,302 | 0.01 | New | 0 | ±0 |
| Independent Social Group (ASI) | 1,237 | 0.00 | New | 0 | ±0 |
| Independent Social Democratic Party of the Valencian Community (PSICV) | 1,096 | 0.00 | New | 0 | ±0 |
| Republican Party (PRF) | 1,051 | 0.00 | New | 0 | ±0 |
| Alternative for Gran Canaria (AxGC) | 957 | 0.00 | New | 0 | ±0 |
| Alliance for National Unity (AUN) | 923 | 0.00 | New | 0 | ±0 |
| Left Assembly–Initiative for Andalusia (A–IZ) | 901 | 0.00 | New | 0 | ±0 |
| Christian Positivist Party (PPCr) | 892 | 0.00 | ±0.00 | 0 | ±0 |
| Asturian Left (IAS) | 854 | 0.00 | ±0.00 | 0 | ±0 |
| Socialist Party of the People of Ceuta (PSPC) | 807 | 0.00 | ±0.00 | 0 | ±0 |
| Liberal Centrist Union (UCL) | 798 | 0.00 | New | 0 | ±0 |
| Caló Nationalist Party (PNCA) | 757 | 0.00 | −0.01 | 0 | ±0 |
| United Zamora (ZU) | 754 | 0.00 | New | 0 | ±0 |
| Union of Centrists of Menorca (UCM) | 751 | 0.00 | New | 0 | ±0 |
| Internationalist Struggle (LI (LIT–CI)) | 668 | 0.00 | −0.01 | 0 | ±0 |
| Spanish Democratic Front (FDE) | 619 | 0.00 | New | 0 | ±0 |
| Castilian Unity (UdCa) | 601 | 0.00 | New | 0 | ±0 |
| Andalusian Social Democratic Party (PSDA) | 583 | 0.00 | New | 0 | ±0 |
| Nationalist Maga Alternative (AMAGA) | 468 | 0.00 | New | 0 | ±0 |
| Balearic People's Union (UPB) | 411 | 0.00 | ±0.00 | 0 | ±0 |
| European Nation State (N) | 410 | 0.00 | ±0.00 | 0 | ±0 |
| Workers for Democracy Coalition (TD) | 407 | 0.00 | New | 0 | ±0 |
| National Workers' Party (PNT) | 379 | 0.00 | New | 0 | ±0 |
| Party of The People (LG) | 378 | 0.00 | New | 0 | ±0 |
| Regionalist Party of Guadalajara (PRGU) | 330 | 0.00 | ±0.00 | 0 | ±0 |
| National Union (UN) | 318 | 0.00 | ±0.00 | 0 | ±0 |
| Citizens' Convergence of the South-East (CCSE) | 308 | 0.00 | ±0.00 | 0 | ±0 |
| National Democratic Party of Spain (PDNE) | 232 | 0.00 | New | 0 | ±0 |
| Spanish Absolute Honesty Political Group (GPHAE) | 52 | 0.00 | New | 0 | ±0 |
| Blank ballots | 407,795 | 1.58 | ±0.00 | | |
| Total | 25,891,299 | | | 350 | ±0 |
| Valid votes | 25,891,299 | 98.99 | −0.33 | | |
| Invalid votes | 264,137 | 1.01 | +0.33 | | |
| Votes cast / turnout | 26,155,436 | 75.66 | +6.95 | | |
| Abstentions | 8,416,395 | 24.34 | −6.95 | | |
| Registered voters | 34,571,831 | | | | |
Sources
Footnotes: ^{1} Spanish Socialist Workers' Party results are compared to the combined totals of Spanish Socialist Workers' Party–Progressives and Extremaduran Coalition in the 2000 election.; ^{2} United Left results are compared to the combined totals of United Left, Initiative for Catalonia–Greens and Independent Socialists of Extremadura in the 2000 election. It does not include results in the Balearic Islands.; ^{3} Basque Nationalist Party and Basque Solidarity do not include results in Navarre.; ^{4} Navarre Yes results are compared to the combined totals of Basque Solidarity and Basque Nationalist Party in Navarre in the 2000 election.; ^{5} Progressives for the Balearic Islands results are compared to the combined totals of Socialist Party of Mallorca–Nationalist Agreement, United Left of the Balearic Islands, The Greens of the Balearic Islands and Republican Left of Catalonia in the 2000 election, only in the Balearic Islands.; ^{6} Spanish Phalanx of the CNSO results are compared to Independent Spanish Phalanx–Phalanx 2000 totals in the 2000 election.

== Summary ==
=== Constituencies ===

Summary of constituency results in the 14 March 2004 Congress of Deputies election
| Constituency | PSOE | | PP | | IU | | CiU | | ERC | | PNV | | CC | | BNG | | CHA | | EA | | NaBai | |
| Constituency | % | S | % | S | % | S | % | S | % | S | % | S | % | S | % | S | % | S | % | S | % | S |
|---|---|---|---|---|---|---|---|---|---|---|---|---|---|---|---|---|---|---|---|---|---|---|
| A Coruña | 38.9 | 4 | 44.6 | 4 | 1.9 | − | | | | | | | | | 11.7 | 1 | | | | | | |
| Álava | 30.8 | 2 | 26.9 | 1 | 7.8 | − | | | | | 25.8 | 1 | | | | | | | 4.3 | − | | |
| Albacete | 46.3 | 2 | 46.9 | 2 | 3.9 | − | | | | | | | | | | | | | | | | |
| Alicante | 42.1 | 5 | 48.9 | 6 | 3.9 | − | | | 0.3 | − | | | | | | | | | | | | |
| Almería | 47.7 | 3 | 44.3 | 2 | 3.1 | − | | | | | | | | | | | | | | | | |
| Asturias | 43.4 | 4 | 43.8 | 4 | 8.4 | − | | | | | | | | | | | | | | | | |
| Ávila | 34.0 | 1 | 59.5 | 2 | 3.2 | − | | | | | | | | | | | | | | | | |
| Badajoz | 51.7 | 3 | 41.7 | 3 | 3.9 | − | | | | | | | | | | | | | | | | |
| Balearic Islands | 39.5 | 4 | 45.9 | 4 | | | | | | | | | | | | | | | | | | |
| Barcelona | 41.7 | 14 | 16.0 | 5 | 6.5 | 2 | 19.3 | 6 | 14.1 | 4 | | | | | | | | | | | | |
| Biscay | 26.8 | 3 | 18.7 | 2 | 8.6 | − | | | | | 37.3 | 4 | | | | | | | 4.3 | − | | |
| Burgos | 38.9 | 2 | 52.0 | 2 | 3.3 | − | | | | | | | | | | | | | | | | |
| Cáceres | 50.5 | 2 | 43.5 | 2 | 2.8 | − | | | | | | | | | | | | | | | | |
| Cádiz | 50.7 | 6 | 33.6 | 3 | 6.0 | − | | | | | | | | | | | | | | | | |
| Cantabria | 40.9 | 2 | 51.9 | 3 | 3.3 | − | | | | | | | | | | | | | | | | |
| Castellón | 44.6 | 2 | 45.6 | 3 | 3.3 | − | | | 0.7 | − | | | | | | | | | | | | |
| Ceuta | 35.8 | − | 59.2 | 1 | 0.6 | − | | | | | | | | | | | | | | | | |
| Ciudad Real | 48.1 | 3 | 46.6 | 2 | 2.8 | − | | | | | | | | | | | | | | | | |
| Córdoba | 49.9 | 4 | 33.7 | 3 | 9.7 | − | | | | | | | | | | | | | | | | |
| Cuenca | 45.4 | 1 | 49.7 | 2 | 2.4 | − | | | | | | | | | | | | | | | | |
| Girona | 31.6 | 2 | 11.5 | − | 4.2 | − | 27.1 | 2 | 23.3 | 2 | | | | | | | | | | | | |
| Granada | 51.5 | 4 | 37.0 | 3 | 6.0 | − | | | | | | | | | | | | | | | | |
| Guadalajara | 44.1 | 1 | 47.6 | 2 | 4.4 | − | | | | | | | | | | | | | | | | |
| Guipúzcoa | 26.3 | 2 | 15.3 | 1 | 7.7 | − | | | | | 31.0 | 2 | | | | | | | 11.5 | 1 | | |
| Huelva | 56.2 | 3 | 30.6 | 2 | 5.5 | − | | | | | | | | | | | | | | | | |
| Huesca | 45.7 | 2 | 37.5 | 1 | 2.7 | − | | | | | | | | | | | 6.4 | − | | | | |
| Jaén | 54.4 | 4 | 34.1 | 2 | 5.8 | − | | | | | | | | | | | | | | | | |
| La Rioja | 44.0 | 2 | 49.9 | 2 | 2.8 | − | | | | | | | | | | | | | | | | |
| Las Palmas | 33.9 | 3 | 42.2 | 4 | 2.0 | − | | | | | | | 18.1 | 1 | | | | | | | | |
| León | 46.8 | 3 | 45.0 | 2 | 2.1 | − | | | | | | | | | | | | | | | | |
| Lleida | 29.6 | 2 | 14.6 | − | 3.0 | − | 29.5 | 1 | 21.5 | 1 | | | | | | | | | | | | |
| Lugo | 37.2 | 2 | 49.7 | 2 | 1.0 | − | | | | | | | | | 10.1 | − | | | | | | |
| Madrid | 44.1 | 16 | 45.0 | 17 | 6.4 | 2 | | | | | | | | | | | | | | | | |
| Málaga | 49.8 | 6 | 36.4 | 4 | 6.4 | − | | | | | | | | | | | | | | | | |
| Melilla | 41.4 | − | 54.6 | 1 | 0.8 | − | | | | | | | | | | | | | | | | |
| Murcia | 35.0 | 3 | 57.4 | 6 | 4.3 | − | | | | | | | | | | | | | | | | |
| Navarre | 33.6 | 2 | 37.6 | 2 | 5.9 | − | | | | | | | | | | | | | | | 18.0 | 1 |
| Ourense | 31.1 | 1 | 55.3 | 3 | 0.9 | − | | | | | | | | | 10.9 | − | | | | | | |
| Palencia | 43.1 | 1 | 50.2 | 2 | 2.8 | − | | | | | | | | | | | | | | | | |
| Pontevedra | 37.5 | 3 | 46.0 | 3 | 2.2 | − | | | | | | | | | 11.6 | 1 | | | | | | |
| Salamanca | 39.8 | 2 | 54.3 | 2 | 2.0 | − | | | | | | | | | | | | | | | | |
| Santa Cruz de Tenerife | 35.0 | 3 | 28.3 | 2 | 1.9 | − | | | | | | | 30.9 | 2 | | | | | | | | |
| Segovia | 39.9 | 1 | 52.4 | 2 | 3.5 | − | | | | | | | | | | | | | | | | |
| Seville | 58.3 | 8 | 27.9 | 4 | 6.7 | − | | | | | | | | | | | | | | | | |
| Soria | 38.8 | 1 | 50.8 | 2 | 2.1 | − | | | | | | | | | | | | | | | | |
| Tarragona | 35.5 | 3 | 17.0 | 1 | 3.8 | − | 21.5 | 1 | 19.8 | 1 | | | | | | | | | | | | |
| Teruel | 41.1 | 2 | 40.8 | 1 | 2.9 | − | | | | | | | | | | | 5.1 | − | | | | |
| Toledo | 46.5 | 2 | 47.5 | 3 | 3.5 | − | | | | | | | | | | | | | | | | |
| Valencia | 42.2 | 7 | 45.7 | 8 | 5.4 | 1 | | | 0.6 | − | | | | | | | | | | | | |
| Valladolid | 44.6 | 2 | 46.8 | 3 | 3.7 | − | | | | | | | | | | | | | | | | |
| Zamora | 39.9 | 1 | 53.3 | 2 | 2.5 | − | | | | | | | | | | | | | | | | |
| Zaragoza | 40.3 | 3 | 35.5 | 3 | 2.8 | − | | | | | | | | | | | 14.5 | 1 | | | | |
| Total | 42.6 | 164 | 37.7 | 148 | 5.0 | 5 | 3.2 | 10 | 2.5 | 8 | 1.6 | 7 | 0.9 | 3 | 0.8 | 2 | 0.4 | 1 | 0.3 | 1 | 0.2 | 1 |

=== Regions ===

Summary of regional results in the 14 March 2004 Congress of Deputies election
| Region | PSOE | | PP | | IU | | CiU | | ERC | | PNV | | CC | | BNG | | CHA | | EA | | NaBai | |
| Region | % | S | % | S | % | S | % | S | % | S | % | S | % | S | % | S | % | S | % | S | % | S |
|---|---|---|---|---|---|---|---|---|---|---|---|---|---|---|---|---|---|---|---|---|---|---|
| Andalusia | 52.9 | 38 | 33.7 | 23 | 6.4 | − | | | | | | | | | | | | | | | | |
| Aragon | 41.3 | 7 | 36.5 | 5 | 2.8 | − | | | | | | | | | | | 12.1 | 1 | | | | |
| Asturias | 43.4 | 4 | 43.8 | 4 | 8.4 | − | | | | | | | | | | | | | | | | |
| Balearic Islands | 39.5 | 4 | 45.9 | 4 | | | | | | | | | | | | | | | | | | |
| Basque Country | 27.2 | 7 | 18.9 | 4 | 8.2 | − | | | | | 33.7 | 7 | | | | | | | 6.5 | 1 | | |
| Canary Islands | 34.5 | 6 | 35.4 | 6 | 1.9 | − | | | | | | | 24.3 | 3 | | | | | | | | |
| Cantabria | 40.9 | 2 | 51.9 | 3 | 3.3 | − | | | | | | | | | | | | | | | | |
| Castile and León | 41.9 | 14 | 50.3 | 19 | 2.8 | − | | | | | | | | | | | | | | | | |
| Castilla–La Mancha | 46.5 | 9 | 47.4 | 11 | 3.4 | − | | | | | | | | | | | | | | | | |
| Catalonia | 39.5 | 21 | 15.6 | 6 | 5.8 | 2 | 20.8 | 10 | 15.9 | 8 | | | | | | | | | | | | |
| Ceuta | 35.8 | − | 59.2 | 1 | 0.6 | − | | | | | | | | | | | | | | | | |
| Extremadura | 51.2 | 5 | 42.4 | 5 | 3.5 | − | | | | | | | | | | | | | | | | |
| Galicia | 37.2 | 10 | 47.1 | 12 | 1.7 | − | | | | | | | | | 11.4 | 2 | | | | | | |
| La Rioja | 44.0 | 2 | 49.9 | 2 | 2.8 | − | | | | | | | | | | | | | | | | |
| Madrid | 44.1 | 16 | 45.0 | 17 | 6.4 | 2 | | | | | | | | | | | | | | | | |
| Melilla | 41.4 | − | 54.6 | 1 | 0.8 | − | | | | | | | | | | | | | | | | |
| Murcia | 35.0 | 3 | 57.4 | 6 | 4.3 | − | | | | | | | | | | | | | | | | |
| Navarre | 33.6 | 2 | 37.6 | 2 | 5.9 | − | | | | | | | | | | | | | | | 18.0 | 1 |
| Valencian Community | 42.4 | 14 | 46.8 | 17 | 4.7 | 1 | | | 0.5 | – | | | | | | | | | | | | |
| Total | 42.6 | 164 | 37.7 | 148 | 5.0 | 5 | 3.2 | 10 | 2.5 | 8 | 1.6 | 7 | 0.9 | 3 | 0.8 | 2 | 0.4 | 1 | 0.3 | 1 | 0.2 | 1 |

== Autonomous communities ==
=== Andalusia ===
← Summary of the 14 March 2004 Congress of Deputies election results in Andalusia →
| Parties and alliances | Popular vote | | | Seats | |
| Parties and alliances | Votes | % | ±pp | Total | +/− |
|---|---|---|---|---|---|
| Spanish Socialist Workers' Party (PSOE) | 2,377,455 | 52.86 | +9.00 | 38 | +8 |
| People's Party (PP) | 1,514,987 | 33.69 | −6.88 | 23 | −5 |
| United Left/The Greens–Assembly for Andalusia (IULV–CA) | 287,374 | 6.39 | −1.43 | 0 | −3 |
| Andalusian Party (PA) | 181,868 | 4.04 | −1.07 | 0 | −1 |
| Socialist Party of Andalusia (PSA) | 24,127 | 0.54 | New | 0 | ±0 |
| Citizens for Blank Votes (CenB) | 6,653 | 0.15 | New | 0 | ±0 |
| Humanist Party (PH) | 4,055 | 0.09 | +0.01 | 0 | ±0 |
| Republican Left (IR) | 3,462 | 0.08 | New | 0 | ±0 |
| Democratic and Social Centre (CDS) | 3,336 | 0.07 | +0.02 | 0 | ±0 |
| Andalusia Assembly (A) | 2,930 | 0.07 | ±0.00 | 0 | ±0 |
| Family and Life Party (PFyV) | 2,596 | 0.06 | New | 0 | ±0 |
| Spanish Phalanx of the CNSO (FE de las JONS)^{1} | 2,190 | 0.05 | +0.02 | 0 | ±0 |
| Party of Precarious Workers (PTPRE) | 2,115 | 0.05 | New | 0 | ±0 |
| National Democracy (DN) | 1,956 | 0.04 | New | 0 | ±0 |
| The Phalanx (FE) | 1,708 | 0.04 | −0.02 | 0 | ±0 |
| Republican Social Movement (MSR) | 1,276 | 0.03 | New | 0 | ±0 |
| Spanish Democratic Party (PADE) | 1,023 | 0.02 | −0.02 | 0 | ±0 |
| Left Assembly–Initiative for Andalusia (A–IZ) | 901 | 0.02 | New | 0 | ±0 |
| Christian Positivist Party (PPCr) | 892 | 0.02 | +0.01 | 0 | ±0 |
| Andalusian Social Democratic Party (PSDA) | 583 | 0.01 | New | 0 | ±0 |
| Spain 2000 (E–2000) | 503 | 0.01 | −0.03 | 0 | ±0 |
| Communist Party of the Peoples of Spain (PCPE) | 372 | 0.01 | −0.08 | 0 | ±0 |
| National Union (UN) | 318 | 0.01 | ±0.00 | 0 | ±0 |
| Authentic Phalanx (FA) | 288 | 0.01 | New | 0 | ±0 |
| Blank ballots | 74,305 | 1.65 | +0.28 | | |
| Total | 4,497,273 | | | 61 | −1 |
| Valid votes | 4,497,273 | 99.39 | +0.09 | | |
| Invalid votes | 27,780 | 0.61 | −0.09 | | |
| Votes cast / turnout | 4,525,053 | 74.77 | +6.00 | | |
| Abstentions | 1,526,716 | 25.23 | −6.00 | | |
| Registered voters | 6,051,769 | | | | |
Sources
Footnotes: ^{1} Spanish Phalanx of the CNSO results are compared to Independent Spanish Phalanx–Phalanx 2000 totals in the 2000 election.

=== Aragon ===
← Summary of the 14 March 2004 Congress of Deputies election results in Aragon →
| Parties and alliances | Popular vote | | | Seats | |
| Parties and alliances | Votes | % | ±pp | Total | +/− |
|---|---|---|---|---|---|
| Spanish Socialist Workers' Party (PSOE) | 322,428 | 41.28 | +10.20 | 7 | +3 |
| People's Party (PP) | 284,893 | 36.48 | −10.75 | 5 | −3 |
| Aragonese Union (CHA) | 94,252 | 12.07 | +1.65 | 1 | ±0 |
| Aragonese Party (PAR) | 36,540 | 4.68 | −0.70 | 0 | ±0 |
| United Left–The Greens (IU–LV) | 21,836 | 2.80 | −0.71 | 0 | ±0 |
| Citizens for Blank Votes (CenB) | 1,037 | 0.13 | New | 0 | ±0 |
| Democratic and Social Centre (CDS) | 775 | 0.10 | +0.07 | 0 | ±0 |
| Family and Life Party (PFyV) | 719 | 0.09 | New | 0 | ±0 |
| National Democracy (DN) | 581 | 0.07 | New | 0 | ±0 |
| Communist Party of the Peoples of Spain (PCPE) | 460 | 0.06 | New | 0 | ±0 |
| Republican Left (IR) | 428 | 0.05 | New | 0 | ±0 |
| Humanist Party (PH) | 359 | 0.05 | ±0.00 | 0 | ±0 |
| Spanish Phalanx of the CNSO (FE de las JONS)^{1} | 310 | 0.04 | +0.01 | 0 | ±0 |
| The Phalanx (FE) | 258 | 0.03 | −0.02 | 0 | ±0 |
| Republican Social Movement (MSR) | 163 | 0.02 | New | 0 | ±0 |
| Authentic Phalanx (FA) | 161 | 0.02 | New | 0 | ±0 |
| Carlist Party (PC) | 99 | 0.01 | New | 0 | ±0 |
| Spanish Democratic Party (PADE) | 23 | 0.00 | −0.02 | 0 | ±0 |
| Blank ballots | 15,679 | 2.01 | +0.56 | | |
| Total | 781,001 | | | 13 | ±0 |
| Valid votes | 781,001 | 99.40 | +0.11 | | |
| Invalid votes | 4,731 | 0.60 | −0.11 | | |
| Votes cast / turnout | 785,732 | 77.04 | +5.65 | | |
| Abstentions | 234,191 | 22.96 | −5.65 | | |
| Registered voters | 1,019,923 | | | | |
Sources
Footnotes: ^{1} Spanish Phalanx of the CNSO results are compared to Independent Spanish Phalanx–Phalanx 2000 totals in the 2000 election.

=== Asturias ===
← Summary of the 14 March 2004 Congress of Deputies election results in Asturias →
| Parties and alliances | Popular vote | | | Seats | |
| Parties and alliances | Votes | % | ±pp | Total | +/− |
|---|---|---|---|---|---|
| People's Party (PP) | 307,977 | 43.77 | −2.56 | 4 | −1 |
| Spanish Socialist Workers' Party (PSOE) | 305,240 | 43.38 | +6.36 | 4 | +1 |
| United Left–Bloc for Asturias (IU–BA) | 59,253 | 8.42 | −1.84 | 0 | −1 |
| The Greens of Asturias (Verdes) | 5,013 | 0.71 | −0.03 | 0 | ±0 |
| Asturianist Party (PAS) | 4,292 | 0.61 | −0.29 | 0 | ±0 |
| Andecha Astur (AA) | 1,970 | 0.28 | −0.03 | 0 | ±0 |
| Citizens for Blank Votes (CenB) | 1,348 | 0.19 | New | 0 | ±0 |
| Asturian Left (IAS) | 854 | 0.12 | −0.05 | 0 | ±0 |
| Communist Party of the Peoples of Spain (PCPE) | 798 | 0.11 | New | 0 | ±0 |
| Asturian Democratic Convergence–CDS (CDAS–CDS) | 582 | 0.08 | −0.02 | 0 | ±0 |
| Humanist Party (PH) | 415 | 0.06 | +0.01 | 0 | ±0 |
| Republican Left (IR) | 377 | 0.05 | New | 0 | ±0 |
| National Democracy (DN) | 254 | 0.04 | New | 0 | ±0 |
| Spanish Phalanx of the CNSO (FE de las JONS)^{1} | 253 | 0.04 | +0.01 | 0 | ±0 |
| Republican Social Movement (MSR) | 216 | 0.03 | New | 0 | ±0 |
| The Phalanx (FE) | 181 | 0.03 | −0.02 | 0 | ±0 |
| Authentic Phalanx (FA) | 179 | 0.03 | New | 0 | ±0 |
| Blank ballots | 14,453 | 2.05 | +0.37 | | |
| Total | 703,655 | | | 8 | −1 |
| Valid votes | 703,655 | 99.45 | +0.11 | | |
| Invalid votes | 3,902 | 0.55 | −0.11 | | |
| Votes cast / turnout | 707,557 | 71.73 | +4.74 | | |
| Abstentions | 278,795 | 28.27 | −4.74 | | |
| Registered voters | 986,352 | | | | |
Sources
Footnotes: ^{1} Spanish Phalanx of the CNSO results are compared to Independent Spanish Phalanx–Phalanx 2000 totals in the 2000 election.

=== Balearic Islands ===
← Summary of the 14 March 2004 Congress of Deputies election results in the Balearic Islands →
| Parties and alliances | Popular vote | | | Seats | |
| Parties and alliances | Votes | % | ±pp | Total | +/− |
|---|---|---|---|---|---|
| People's Party (PP) | 215,737 | 45.89 | −7.98 | 4 | −1 |
| Spanish Socialist Workers' Party (PSOE) | 185,623 | 39.48 | +10.20 | 4 | +2 |
| Progressives for the Balearic Islands (PSM–EN, EU, EV, ER)^{1} | 40,289 | 8.57 | −4.07 | 0 | ±0 |
| Majorcan Union (UM) | 10,558 | 2.25 | +0.15 | 0 | ±0 |
| European Green Group (GVE) | 2,662 | 0.57 | New | 0 | ±0 |
| Citizens for Blank Votes (CenB) | 1,588 | 0.34 | New | 0 | ±0 |
| Independent Social Group (ASI) | 1,237 | 0.26 | New | 0 | ±0 |
| Republican Left (IR) | 825 | 0.18 | New | 0 | ±0 |
| Union of Centrists of Menorca (UCM) | 751 | 0.16 | New | 0 | ±0 |
| Balearic People's Union (UPB) | 411 | 0.09 | −0.04 | 0 | ±0 |
| Workers for Democracy Coalition (TD) | 407 | 0.09 | −0.02 | 0 | ±0 |
| Spanish Phalanx of the CNSO (FE de las JONS)^{2} | 325 | 0.07 | +0.02 | 0 | ±0 |
| The Phalanx (FE) | 272 | 0.06 | ±0.00 | 0 | ±0 |
| National Democracy (DN) | 227 | 0.05 | New | 0 | ±0 |
| Republican Social Movement (MSR) | 134 | 0.03 | New | 0 | ±0 |
| Blank ballots | 9,073 | 1.93 | +0.44 | | |
| Total | 470,119 | | | 8 | +1 |
| Valid votes | 470,119 | 99.29 | −0.05 | | |
| Invalid votes | 3,362 | 0.71 | +0.05 | | |
| Votes cast / turnout | 473,481 | 68.84 | +7.41 | | |
| Abstentions | 214,353 | 31.16 | −7.41 | | |
| Registered voters | 687,834 | | | | |
Sources
Footnotes: ^{1} Progressives for the Balearic Islands results are compared to the combined totals of Socialist Party of Mallorca–Nationalist Agreement, United Left of the Balearic Islands, The Greens of the Balearic Islands and Republican Left of Catalonia in the 2000 election.; ^{2} Spanish Phalanx of the CNSO results are compared to Independent Spanish Phalanx–Phalanx 2000 totals in the 2000 election.

=== Basque Country ===
← Summary of the 14 March 2004 Congress of Deputies election results in the Basque Country →
| Parties and alliances | Popular vote | | | Seats | |
| Parties and alliances | Votes | % | ±pp | Total | +/− |
|---|---|---|---|---|---|
| Basque Nationalist Party (EAJ/PNV) | 420,980 | 33.72 | +3.34 | 7 | ±0 |
| Socialist Party of the Basque Country–Basque Country Left (PSE–EE (PSOE)) | 339,751 | 27.22 | +3.91 | 7 | +3 |
| People's Party (PP) | 235,785 | 18.89 | −9.37 | 4 | −3 |
| United Left (EB/IU) | 102,342 | 8.20 | +2.75 | 0 | ±0 |
| Basque Solidarity (EA) | 80,905 | 6.48 | −1.09 | 1 | ±0 |
| Aralar–Stand up (Aralar–Zutik) | 38,560 | 3.09 | New | 0 | ±0 |
| Humanist Party (PH) | 4,022 | 0.32 | +0.05 | 0 | ±0 |
| Party of the Democratic Karma (PKD) | 2,300 | 0.18 | −0.06 | 0 | ±0 |
| Internationalist Socialist Workers' Party (POSI) | 1,682 | 0.13 | +0.02 | 0 | ±0 |
| Democratic and Social Centre (CDS) | 1,472 | 0.12 | +0.06 | 0 | ±0 |
| Republican Left (IR) | 1,193 | 0.10 | New | 0 | ±0 |
| National Democracy (DN) | 707 | 0.06 | New | 0 | ±0 |
| Republican Social Movement (MSR) | 528 | 0.04 | New | 0 | ±0 |
| Carlist Party of the Basque Country–Carlist Party (EKA–PC) | 515 | 0.04 | ±0.00 | 0 | ±0 |
| Spanish Phalanx of the CNSO (FE de las JONS)^{1} | 320 | 0.03 | +0.01 | 0 | ±0 |
| The Phalanx (FE) | 266 | 0.02 | −0.02 | 0 | ±0 |
| Authentic Phalanx (FA) | 100 | 0.01 | New | 0 | ±0 |
| Blank ballots | 16,889 | 1.35 | −1.66 | | |
| Total | 1,248,317 | | | 19 | ±0 |
| Valid votes | 1,248,317 | 92.31 | −6.63 | | |
| Invalid votes | 104,017 | 7.69 | +6.63 | | |
| Votes cast / turnout | 1,352,334 | 74.97 | +11.13 | | |
| Abstentions | 451,603 | 25.03 | −11.13 | | |
| Registered voters | 1,803,937 | | | | |
Sources
Footnotes: ^{1} Spanish Phalanx of the CNSO results are compared to Independent Spanish Phalanx–Phalanx 2000 totals in the 2000 election.

=== Canary Islands ===
← Summary of the 14 March 2004 Congress of Deputies election results in the Canary Islands →
| Parties and alliances | Popular vote | | | Seats | |
| Parties and alliances | Votes | % | ±pp | Total | +/− |
|---|---|---|---|---|---|
| People's Party (PP) | 342,672 | 35.44 | −6.37 | 6 | −1 |
| Spanish Socialist Workers' Party (PSOE) | 333,084 | 34.45 | +12.26 | 6 | +3 |
| Canarian Coalition (CC) | 235,221 | 24.33 | −5.23 | 3 | −1 |
| The Greens–United Left–Citizens' Alternative Initiative (LV–IU–AC25M) | 18,612 | 1.93 | −0.48 | 0 | ±0 |
| The Greens–Green Group (LV–GV) | 11,033 | 1.14 | New | 0 | ±0 |
| Canarian Nationalist Party (PNC) | 4,092 | 0.42 | New | 0 | ±0 |
| Canarian Popular Alternative (APCa) | 2,715 | 0.28 | New | 0 | ±0 |
| Communist Party of the Canarian People (PCPC) | 1,592 | 0.16 | −0.01 | 0 | ±0 |
| Democratic and Social Centre (CDS) | 1,445 | 0.15 | +0.02 | 0 | ±0 |
| Alternative for Gran Canaria (AxGC) | 957 | 0.10 | New | 0 | ±0 |
| Humanist Party (PH) | 895 | 0.09 | −0.04 | 0 | ±0 |
| Republican Left (IR) | 642 | 0.07 | New | 0 | ±0 |
| Internationalist Socialist Workers' Party (POSI) | 582 | 0.06 | New | 0 | ±0 |
| National Democracy (DN) | 517 | 0.05 | New | 0 | ±0 |
| Spanish Phalanx of the CNSO (FE de las JONS) | 488 | 0.05 | New | 0 | ±0 |
| Nationalist Maga Alternative (AMAGA) | 468 | 0.05 | New | 0 | ±0 |
| Authentic Phalanx (FA) | 456 | 0.05 | New | 0 | ±0 |
| Party of The People (LG) | 378 | 0.04 | New | 0 | ±0 |
| The Phalanx (FE) | 354 | 0.04 | −0.06 | 0 | ±0 |
| Republican Social Movement (MSR) | 261 | 0.03 | New | 0 | ±0 |
| Blank ballots | 10,382 | 1.07 | +0.21 | | |
| Total | 966,846 | | | 15 | +1 |
| Valid votes | 966,846 | 99.42 | +0.07 | | |
| Invalid votes | 5,630 | 0.58 | −0.07 | | |
| Votes cast / turnout | 972,476 | 66.70 | +6.03 | | |
| Abstentions | 485,462 | 33.30 | −6.03 | | |
| Registered voters | 1,457,938 | | | | |

=== Cantabria ===
← Summary of the 14 March 2004 Congress of Deputies election results in Cantabria →
| Parties and alliances | Popular vote | | | Seats | |
| Parties and alliances | Votes | % | ±pp | Total | +/− |
|---|---|---|---|---|---|
| People's Party (PP) | 190,383 | 51.90 | −4.94 | 3 | ±0 |
| Spanish Socialist Workers' Party (PSOE) | 149,906 | 40.87 | +7.40 | 2 | ±0 |
| United Left (IU) | 12,146 | 3.31 | −1.71 | 0 | ±0 |
| Cantabrian Nationalist Council (CNC) | 1,431 | 0.39 | −0.24 | 0 | ±0 |
| Citizens for Blank Votes (CenB) | 1,326 | 0.36 | New | 0 | ±0 |
| Democratic and Social Centre (CDS) | 896 | 0.24 | +0.02 | 0 | ±0 |
| Humanist Party (PH) | 694 | 0.19 | +0.08 | 0 | ±0 |
| Republican Social Movement (MSR) | 500 | 0.14 | New | 0 | ±0 |
| Communist Party of the Peoples of Spain (PCPE) | 431 | 0.12 | −0.04 | 0 | ±0 |
| Spanish Phalanx of the CNSO (FE de las JONS)^{1} | 209 | 0.06 | ±0.00 | 0 | ±0 |
| National Democracy (DN) | 204 | 0.06 | New | 0 | ±0 |
| The Phalanx (FE) | 167 | 0.05 | −0.04 | 0 | ±0 |
| Authentic Phalanx (FA) | 140 | 0.04 | New | 0 | ±0 |
| Carlist Party (PC) | 126 | 0.03 | New | 0 | ±0 |
| Blank ballots | 8,267 | 2.25 | −0.37 | | |
| Total | 366,826 | | | 5 | ±0 |
| Valid votes | 366,826 | 99.12 | +0.08 | | |
| Invalid votes | 3,244 | 0.88 | −0.08 | | |
| Votes cast / turnout | 370,070 | 77.23 | +5.42 | | |
| Abstentions | 109,119 | 22.77 | −5.42 | | |
| Registered voters | 479,189 | | | | |
Sources
Footnotes: ^{1} Spanish Phalanx of the CNSO results are compared to Independent Spanish Phalanx–Phalanx 2000 totals in the 2000 election.

=== Castile and León ===
← Summary of the 14 March 2004 Congress of Deputies election results in Castile and León →
| Parties and alliances | Popular vote | | | Seats | |
| Parties and alliances | Votes | % | ±pp | Total | +/− |
|---|---|---|---|---|---|
| People's Party (PP) | 846,623 | 50.31 | −5.37 | 19 | −3 |
| Spanish Socialist Workers' Party (PSOE) | 705,053 | 41.90 | +9.73 | 14 | +3 |
| United Left (IU) | 47,693 | 2.83 | −1.61 | 0 | ±0 |
| Leonese People's Union (UPL) | 14,160 | 0.84 | −1.81 | 0 | ±0 |
| Commoners' Land–Castilian Nationalist Party (TC–PNC) | 6,816 | 0.41 | −0.57 | 0 | ±0 |
| Citizens for Blank Votes (CenB) | 3,681 | 0.22 | New | 0 | ±0 |
| Democratic and Social Centre (CDS) | 3,306 | 0.20 | −0.12 | 0 | ±0 |
| Initiative for the Development of Soria (IDES) | 2,934 | 0.17 | New | 0 | ±0 |
| Independent Candidacy–The Party of Castile and León (CI–PCL) | 2,421 | 0.14 | −0.13 | 0 | ±0 |
| Union of the Salamancan People (UPSa) | 1,871 | 0.11 | New | 0 | ±0 |
| Cannabis Party for Legalization and Normalization (PCLyN) | 1,851 | 0.11 | New | 0 | ±0 |
| Family and Life Party (PFyV) | 1,690 | 0.10 | New | 0 | ±0 |
| The Greens–Green Group (LV–GV) | 1,581 | 0.09 | New | 0 | ±0 |
| Salamanca–Zamora–León–PREPAL (PREPAL) | 1,322 | 0.08 | −0.05 | 0 | ±0 |
| Humanist Party (PH) | 1,316 | 0.08 | −0.02 | 0 | ±0 |
| Republican Left (IR) | 1,042 | 0.06 | New | 0 | ±0 |
| Spanish Phalanx of the CNSO (FE de las JONS)^{1} | 881 | 0.05 | +0.01 | 0 | ±0 |
| Communist Party of the Castilian People (PCPC–PCPE) | 857 | 0.05 | −0.01 | 0 | ±0 |
| United Zamora (ZU) | 754 | 0.04 | New | 0 | ±0 |
| The Phalanx (FE) | 738 | 0.04 | −0.05 | 0 | ±0 |
| National Democracy (DN) | 695 | 0.04 | New | 0 | ±0 |
| Spanish Democratic Party (PADE) | 622 | 0.04 | −0.03 | 0 | ±0 |
| Authentic Phalanx (FA) | 429 | 0.03 | New | 0 | ±0 |
| Republican Social Movement (MSR) | 408 | 0.02 | New | 0 | ±0 |
| Liberal Centrist Union (UCL) | 140 | 0.01 | New | 0 | ±0 |
| Spain 2000 (E–2000) | 119 | 0.01 | −0.04 | 0 | ±0 |
| Carlist Party (PC) | 91 | 0.01 | ±0.00 | 0 | ±0 |
| Romantic Mutual Support Party (PMAR) | 77 | 0.00 | New | 0 | ±0 |
| Spanish Absolute Honesty Political Group (GPHAE) | 17 | 0.00 | New | 0 | ±0 |
| Blank ballots | 33,669 | 2.00 | −0.01 | | |
| Total | 1,682,857 | | | 33 | ±0 |
| Valid votes | 1,682,857 | 99.23 | +0.01 | | |
| Invalid votes | 13,066 | 0.77 | −0.01 | | |
| Votes cast / turnout | 1,695,923 | 77.81 | +5.24 | | |
| Abstentions | 483,598 | 22.19 | −5.24 | | |
| Registered voters | 2,179,521 | | | | |
Sources
Footnotes: ^{1} Spanish Phalanx of the CNSO results are compared to Independent Spanish Phalanx–Phalanx 2000 totals in the 2000 election.

=== Castilla–La Mancha ===
← Summary of the 14 March 2004 Congress of Deputies election results in Castilla–La Mancha →
| Parties and alliances | Popular vote | | | Seats | |
| Parties and alliances | Votes | % | ±pp | Total | +/− |
|---|---|---|---|---|---|
| People's Party (PP) | 547,764 | 47.40 | −4.96 | 11 | −1 |
| Spanish Socialist Workers' Party (PSOE) | 537,405 | 46.50 | +5.72 | 9 | +1 |
| United Left–Left of Castilla–La Mancha (IU–ICAM) | 39,001 | 3.37 | −0.98 | 0 | ±0 |
| Citizens for Blank Votes (CenB) | 2,270 | 0.20 | New | 0 | ±0 |
| Democratic and Social Centre (CDS) | 1,629 | 0.14 | +0.01 | 0 | ±0 |
| Family and Life Party (PFyV) | 1,379 | 0.12 | New | 0 | ±0 |
| Commoners' Land–Castilian Nationalist Party (TC–PNC) | 1,021 | 0.09 | −0.06 | 0 | ±0 |
| Humanist Party (PH) | 829 | 0.07 | −0.05 | 0 | ±0 |
| Communist Party of the Peoples of Spain (PCPE) | 769 | 0.07 | New | 0 | ±0 |
| National Democracy (DN) | 687 | 0.06 | New | 0 | ±0 |
| Republican Left (IR) | 614 | 0.05 | New | 0 | ±0 |
| Castilian Unity (UdCa) | 601 | 0.05 | New | 0 | ±0 |
| The Phalanx (FE) | 561 | 0.05 | −0.03 | 0 | ±0 |
| Spanish Democratic Party (PADE) | 509 | 0.04 | −0.01 | 0 | ±0 |
| Spanish Phalanx of the CNSO (FE de las JONS)^{1} | 487 | 0.04 | +0.03 | 0 | ±0 |
| Authentic Phalanx (FA) | 363 | 0.03 | New | 0 | ±0 |
| Regionalist Party of Guadalajara (PRGU) | 330 | 0.03 | −0.01 | 0 | ±0 |
| Republican Social Movement (MSR) | 287 | 0.02 | New | 0 | ±0 |
| Romantic Mutual Support Party (PMAR) | 273 | 0.02 | New | 0 | ±0 |
| Internationalist Socialist Workers' Party (POSI) | 152 | 0.01 | New | 0 | ±0 |
| Spanish Absolute Honesty Political Group (GPHAE) | 35 | 0.00 | New | 0 | ±0 |
| Blank ballots | 18,726 | 1.62 | +0.29 | | |
| Total | 1,155,692 | | | 20 | ±0 |
| Valid votes | 1,155,692 | 99.14 | −0.06 | | |
| Invalid votes | 10,050 | 0.86 | +0.06 | | |
| Votes cast / turnout | 1,165,742 | 79.90 | +3.59 | | |
| Abstentions | 293,202 | 20.10 | −3.59 | | |
| Registered voters | 1,458,944 | | | | |
Sources
Footnotes: ^{1} Spanish Phalanx of the CNSO results are compared to Independent Spanish Phalanx–Phalanx 2000 totals in the 2000 election.

=== Catalonia ===
← Summary of the 14 March 2004 Congress of Deputies election results in Catalonia →
| Parties and alliances | Popular vote | | | Seats | |
| Parties and alliances | Votes | % | ±pp | Total | +/− |
|---|---|---|---|---|---|
| Socialists' Party of Catalonia (PSC–PSOE) | 1,586,748 | 39.47 | +5.34 | 21 | +4 |
| Convergence and Union (CiU) | 835,471 | 20.78 | −8.01 | 10 | −5 |
| Republican Left of Catalonia (ERC) | 638,902 | 15.89 | +10.25 | 8 | +7 |
| People's Party (PP) | 626,107 | 15.58 | −7.21 | 6 | −6 |
| Initiative for Catalonia Greens–United and Alternative Left (ICV–EUiA)^{1} | 234,790 | 5.84 | +0.07 | 2 | +1 |
| The Greens–The Ecologist Alternative (EV–AE) | 30,528 | 0.76 | New | 0 | ±0 |
| Internationalist Socialist Workers' Party (POSI) | 3,688 | 0.09 | −0.05 | 0 | ±0 |
| Citizens for Blank Votes (CenB) | 3,641 | 0.09 | New | 0 | ±0 |
| Republican Left–Left Republican Party (IR–PRE) | 3,325 | 0.08 | +0.03 | 0 | ±0 |
| Democratic and Social Centre (CDS) | 2,636 | 0.07 | +0.01 | 0 | ±0 |
| Unsubmissive Seats–Alternative of Discontented Democrats (Ei–ADD) | 2,332 | 0.06 | New | 0 | ±0 |
| Communist Party of the Catalan People (PCPC) | 2,331 | 0.06 | New | 0 | ±0 |
| Family and Life Party (PFiV) | 2,028 | 0.05 | New | 0 | ±0 |
| The Greens–Green Alternative (EV–AV) | 1,836 | 0.05 | −0.29 | 0 | ±0 |
| Spanish Phalanx of the CNSO (FE de las JONS)^{2} | 1,561 | 0.04 | +0.02 | 0 | ±0 |
| Humanist Party (PH) | 1,550 | 0.04 | −0.01 | 0 | ±0 |
| The Phalanx (FE) | 1,410 | 0.04 | ±0.00 | 0 | ±0 |
| National Democracy (DN) | 1,392 | 0.03 | New | 0 | ±0 |
| Caló Nationalist Party (PNCA) | 757 | 0.02 | −0.01 | 0 | ±0 |
| Republican Social Movement (MSR) | 691 | 0.02 | New | 0 | ±0 |
| Spanish Democratic Party (PADE) | 674 | 0.02 | ±0.00 | 0 | ±0 |
| Internationalist Struggle (LI (LIT–CI)) | 487 | 0.01 | −0.01 | 0 | ±0 |
| European Nation State (N) | 410 | 0.01 | −0.02 | 0 | ±0 |
| Spanish Democratic Front (FDE) | 377 | 0.01 | New | 0 | ±0 |
| Spain 2000 (E–2000) | 117 | 0.00 | −0.03 | 0 | ±0 |
| Carlist Party of Catalonia (PCdeC) | 61 | 0.00 | New | 0 | ±0 |
| Blank ballots | 35,923 | 0.89 | −0.52 | | |
| Total | 4,019,773 | | | 47 | +1 |
| Valid votes | 4,019,773 | 99.68 | +0.18 | | |
| Invalid votes | 12,816 | 0.32 | −0.18 | | |
| Votes cast / turnout | 4,032,589 | 75.96 | +11.95 | | |
| Abstentions | 1,276,125 | 24.04 | −11.95 | | |
| Registered voters | 5,308,714 | | | | |
Sources
Footnotes: ^{1} Initiative for Catalonia Greens–United and Alternative Left results are compared to the combined totals of Initiative for Catalonia–Greens and United and Alternative Left in the 2000 election.; ^{2} Spanish Phalanx of the CNSO results are compared to Independent Spanish Phalanx–Phalanx 2000 totals in the 2000 election.

=== Extremadura ===
← Summary of the 14 March 2004 Congress of Deputies election results in Extremadura →
| Parties and alliances | Popular vote | | | Seats | |
| Parties and alliances | Votes | % | ±pp | Total | +/− |
|---|---|---|---|---|---|
| Spanish Socialist Workers' Party (PSOE)^{1} | 356,826 | 51.22 | +6.15 | 5 | ±0 |
| People's Party (PP) | 295,326 | 42.39 | −4.91 | 5 | −1 |
| United Left–Independent Socialists of Extremadura (IU–SIEx)^{2} | 24,158 | 3.47 | −1.44 | 0 | ±0 |
| United Extremadura (EU) | 3,916 | 0.56 | −0.17 | 0 | ±0 |
| The Greens of Extremadura (LV) | 3,133 | 0.45 | −0.07 | 0 | ±0 |
| Communist Party of the Peoples of Spain (PCPE) | 872 | 0.13 | New | 0 | ±0 |
| Citizens for Blank Votes (CenB) | 769 | 0.11 | New | 0 | ±0 |
| Democratic and Social Centre (CDS) | 727 | 0.10 | +0.02 | 0 | ±0 |
| Republican Left (IR) | 384 | 0.06 | New | 0 | ±0 |
| Family and Life Party (PFyV) | 351 | 0.05 | New | 0 | ±0 |
| Humanist Party (PH) | 294 | 0.04 | +0.01 | 0 | ±0 |
| National Democracy (DN) | 283 | 0.04 | New | 0 | ±0 |
| Spanish Phalanx of the CNSO (FE de las JONS)^{3} | 247 | 0.04 | +0.02 | 0 | ±0 |
| Authentic Phalanx (FA) | 203 | 0.02 | New | 0 | ±0 |
| Republican Social Movement (MSR) | 139 | 0.02 | New | 0 | ±0 |
| The Phalanx (FE) | 129 | 0.02 | −0.05 | 0 | ±0 |
| Blank ballots | 8,889 | 1.28 | +0.12 | | |
| Total | 696,646 | | | 10 | −1 |
| Valid votes | 696,646 | 99.26 | +0.05 | | |
| Invalid votes | 5,164 | 0.74 | −0.05 | | |
| Votes cast / turnout | 701,810 | 79.26 | +3.84 | | |
| Abstentions | 183,600 | 20.74 | −3.84 | | |
| Registered voters | 885,410 | | | | |
Sources
Footnotes: ^{1} Spanish Socialist Workers' Party results are compared to the combined totals of Spanish Socialist Workers' Party–Progressives and Extremaduran Coalition in the 2000 election.; ^{2} United Left–Independent Socialists of Extremadura results are compared to the combined totals of United Left and Independent Socialists of Extremadura in the 2000 election.; ^{3} Spanish Phalanx of the CNSO results are compared to Independent Spanish Phalanx–Phalanx 2000 totals in the 2000 election.

=== Galicia ===
← Summary of the 14 March 2004 Congress of Deputies election results in Galicia →
| Parties and alliances | Popular vote | | | Seats | |
| Parties and alliances | Votes | % | ±pp | Total | +/− |
|---|---|---|---|---|---|
| People's Party (PP) | 865,460 | 47.15 | −6.84 | 12 | −4 |
| Socialists' Party of Galicia (PSdeG–PSOE) | 682,684 | 37.19 | +13.48 | 10 | +4 |
| Galician Nationalist Bloc (BNG) | 208,688 | 11.37 | −7.25 | 2 | −1 |
| United Left (EU–IU) | 31,908 | 1.74 | +0.46 | 0 | ±0 |
| Party of Self-employed and Professionals (AUTONOMO) | 3,124 | 0.17 | −0.02 | 0 | ±0 |
| Humanist Party (PH) | 2,740 | 0.15 | +0.03 | 0 | ±0 |
| Democratic and Social Centre (CDS) | 2,507 | 0.14 | +0.04 | 0 | ±0 |
| Galician People's Front (FPG) | 2,257 | 0.12 | −0.02 | 0 | ±0 |
| Galician Coalition (CG) | 2,235 | 0.12 | −0.02 | 0 | ±0 |
| Republican Left–Galician Republican Left (IR–ERG) | 1,669 | 0.09 | New | 0 | ±0 |
| National Democracy (DN) | 1,029 | 0.06 | New | 0 | ±0 |
| Spanish Phalanx of the CNSO (FE de las JONS)^{1} | 715 | 0.04 | +0.02 | 0 | ±0 |
| Spanish Democratic Party (PADE) | 653 | 0.04 | ±0.00 | 0 | ±0 |
| The Phalanx (FE) | 626 | 0.03 | −0.02 | 0 | ±0 |
| Republican Social Movement (MSR) | 539 | 0.03 | New | 0 | ±0 |
| Blank ballots | 28,850 | 1.57 | +0.25 | | |
| Total | 1,835,684 | | | 24 | −1 |
| Valid votes | 1,835,684 | 99.29 | −0.01 | | |
| Invalid votes | 13,130 | 0.71 | +0.01 | | |
| Votes cast / turnout | 1,848,814 | 70.97 | +5.95 | | |
| Abstentions | 756,072 | 29.03 | −5.95 | | |
| Registered voters | 2,604,886 | | | | |
Sources
Footnotes: ^{1} Spanish Phalanx of the CNSO results are compared to Independent Spanish Phalanx–Phalanx 2000 totals in the 2000 election.

=== La Rioja ===
← Summary of the 14 March 2004 Congress of Deputies election results in La Rioja →
| Parties and alliances | Popular vote | | | Seats | |
| Parties and alliances | Votes | % | ±pp | Total | +/− |
|---|---|---|---|---|---|
| People's Party (PP) | 92,441 | 49.94 | −4.16 | 2 | −1 |
| Spanish Socialist Workers' Party (PSOE) | 81,390 | 43.97 | +9.10 | 2 | +1 |
| United Left (IU) | 5,115 | 2.76 | −1.26 | 0 | ±0 |
| Citizens for Blank Votes (CenB) | 926 | 0.50 | New | 0 | ±0 |
| Family and Life Party (PFyV) | 434 | 0.23 | New | 0 | ±0 |
| Democratic and Social Centre (CDS) | 272 | 0.15 | +0.07 | 0 | ±0 |
| Republican Left (IR) | 253 | 0.14 | New | 0 | ±0 |
| The Phalanx (FE) | 154 | 0.08 | +0.02 | 0 | ±0 |
| National Democracy (DN) | 123 | 0.07 | New | 0 | ±0 |
| Republican Social Movement (MSR) | 101 | 0.05 | New | 0 | ±0 |
| Carlist Party (PC) | 63 | 0.03 | ±0.00 | 0 | ±0 |
| Blank ballots | 3,827 | 2.07 | +0.15 | | |
| Total | 185,099 | | | 4 | ±0 |
| Valid votes | 185,099 | 99.22 | −0.02 | | |
| Invalid votes | 1,446 | 0.78 | +0.02 | | |
| Votes cast / turnout | 186,545 | 79.46 | +5.25 | | |
| Abstentions | 48,231 | 20.54 | −5.25 | | |
| Registered voters | 234,776 | | | | |

=== Madrid ===
← Summary of the 14 March 2004 Congress of Deputies election results in Madrid →
| Parties and alliances | Popular vote | | | Seats | |
| Parties and alliances | Votes | % | ±pp | Total | +/− |
|---|---|---|---|---|---|
| People's Party (PP) | 1,576,636 | 45.02 | −7.50 | 17 | −2 |
| Spanish Socialist Workers' Party (PSOE) | 1,544,676 | 44.11 | +11.05 | 16 | +4 |
| United Left of the Community of Madrid (IUCM) | 225,109 | 6.43 | −2.69 | 2 | −1 |
| The Greens of the Community of Madrid (LVCM) | 19,600 | 0.56 | −0.12 | 0 | ±0 |
| The Eco-pacifist Greens (LVEP) | 15,984 | 0.46 | New | 0 | ±0 |
| Citizens for Blank Votes (CenB) | 9,990 | 0.29 | New | 0 | ±0 |
| Democratic and Social Centre (CDS) | 7,528 | 0.21 | +0.10 | 0 | ±0 |
| National Democracy (DN) | 4,036 | 0.12 | New | 0 | ±0 |
| Family and Life Party (PFyV) | 2,888 | 0.08 | New | 0 | ±0 |
| Spanish Phalanx of the CNSO (FE de las JONS)^{1} | 2,676 | 0.08 | +0.03 | 0 | ±0 |
| Alliance for Development and Nature (ADN) | 2,215 | 0.06 | New | 0 | ±0 |
| Party of Self-employed, Retirees and Widows (PAE) | 2,082 | 0.06 | +0.02 | 0 | ±0 |
| The Phalanx (FE) | 1,943 | 0.06 | ±0.00 | 0 | ±0 |
| Humanist Party (PH) | 1,770 | 0.05 | −0.02 | 0 | ±0 |
| Communist Party of the Peoples of Spain (PCPE) | 1,746 | 0.05 | −0.04 | 0 | ±0 |
| Republican Left (IR) | 1,530 | 0.04 | New | 0 | ±0 |
| Another Democracy is Possible (ODeP) | 1,302 | 0.04 | New | 0 | ±0 |
| Romantic Mutual Support Party (PMAR) | 1,211 | 0.03 | New | 0 | ±0 |
| Commoners' Land–Castilian Nationalist Party (TC–PNC) | 1,029 | 0.03 | −0.01 | 0 | ±0 |
| Spanish Democratic Party (PADE) | 1,024 | 0.03 | −0.01 | 0 | ±0 |
| Alliance for National Unity (AUN) | 923 | 0.03 | New | 0 | ±0 |
| Authentic Phalanx (FA) | 909 | 0.03 | New | 0 | ±0 |
| Internationalist Socialist Workers' Party (POSI) | 892 | 0.03 | −0.03 | 0 | ±0 |
| Republican Social Movement (MSR) | 684 | 0.02 | New | 0 | ±0 |
| Spain 2000 (E–2000) | 528 | 0.02 | ±0.00 | 0 | ±0 |
| Liberal Centrist Union (UCL) | 410 | 0.01 | New | 0 | ±0 |
| Carlist Party (PC) | 238 | 0.01 | ±0.00 | 0 | ±0 |
| Internationalist Struggle (LI (LIT–CI)) | 181 | 0.01 | ±0.00 | 0 | ±0 |
| Blank ballots | 72,038 | 2.06 | +0.18 | | |
| Total | 3,501,778 | | | 35 | +1 |
| Valid votes | 3,501,778 | 99.50 | +0.02 | | |
| Invalid votes | 17,465 | 0.50 | −0.02 | | |
| Votes cast / turnout | 3,519,243 | 78.93 | +6.85 | | |
| Abstentions | 939,297 | 21.07 | −6.85 | | |
| Registered voters | 4,458,540 | | | | |
Sources
Footnotes: ^{1} Spanish Phalanx of the CNSO results are compared to Independent Spanish Phalanx–Phalanx 2000 totals in the 2000 election.

=== Murcia ===
← Summary of the 14 March 2004 Congress of Deputies election results in Murcia →
| Parties and alliances | Popular vote | | | Seats | |
| Parties and alliances | Votes | % | ±pp | Total | +/− |
|---|---|---|---|---|---|
| People's Party (PP) | 413,902 | 57.42 | −0.66 | 6 | ±0 |
| Spanish Socialist Workers' Party (PSOE) | 252,246 | 35.00 | +2.62 | 3 | ±0 |
| United Left (IU) | 30,787 | 4.27 | −1.97 | 0 | ±0 |
| The Greens of the Region of Murcia (LVRM) | 7,074 | 0.98 | ±0.00 | 0 | ±0 |
| Democratic and Social Centre (CDS) | 1,153 | 0.16 | +0.07 | 0 | ±0 |
| Citizens for Blank Votes (CenB) | 957 | 0.13 | New | 0 | ±0 |
| Family and Life Party (PFyV) | 657 | 0.09 | New | 0 | ±0 |
| Republican Left (IR) | 521 | 0.07 | New | 0 | ±0 |
| Spanish Democratic Party (PADE) | 426 | 0.06 | −0.15 | 0 | ±0 |
| Communist Party of the Peoples of Spain (PCPE) | 419 | 0.06 | New | 0 | ±0 |
| National Workers' Party (PNT) | 379 | 0.05 | New | 0 | ±0 |
| Authentic Phalanx (FA) | 361 | 0.05 | New | 0 | ±0 |
| Spanish Phalanx of the CNSO (FE de las JONS) | 353 | 0.05 | New | 0 | ±0 |
| Citizens' Convergence of the South-East (CCSE) | 308 | 0.04 | −0.06 | 0 | ±0 |
| National Democracy (DN) | 258 | 0.04 | New | 0 | ±0 |
| National Democratic Party of Spain (PDNE) | 232 | 0.03 | New | 0 | ±0 |
| The Phalanx (FE) | 228 | 0.03 | −0.06 | 0 | ±0 |
| Republican Social Movement (MSR) | 183 | 0.03 | New | 0 | ±0 |
| Blank ballots | 10,331 | 1.43 | +0.36 | | |
| Total | 720,775 | | | 9 | ±0 |
| Valid votes | 720,775 | 99.38 | −0.05 | | |
| Invalid votes | 4,491 | 0.62 | +0.05 | | |
| Votes cast / turnout | 725,266 | 77.06 | +3.52 | | |
| Abstentions | 215,879 | 22.94 | −3.52 | | |
| Registered voters | 941,145 | | | | |

=== Navarre ===
← Summary of the 14 March 2004 Congress of Deputies election results in Navarre →
| Parties and alliances | Popular vote | | | Seats | |
| Parties and alliances | Votes | % | ±pp | Total | +/− |
|---|---|---|---|---|---|
| Navarrese People's Union–People's Party (UPN–PP) | 127,653 | 37.60 | −12.29 | 2 | −1 |
| Spanish Socialist Workers' Party (PSOE) | 113,906 | 33.55 | +6.23 | 2 | ±0 |
| Navarre Yes (NaBai)^{1} | 61,045 | 17.98 | +11.13 | 1 | +1 |
| United Left of Navarre (IUN/NEB) | 19,899 | 5.86 | −1.75 | 0 | ±0 |
| Convergence of Democrats of Navarre (CDN) | 5,573 | 1.64 | −1.22 | 0 | ±0 |
| Humanist Party (PH) | 958 | 0.28 | −0.04 | 0 | ±0 |
| Family and Life Party (PFyV) | 778 | 0.23 | New | 0 | ±0 |
| Democratic and Social Centre (CDS) | 763 | 0.22 | +0.05 | 0 | ±0 |
| Republican Left (IR) | 634 | 0.19 | New | 0 | ±0 |
| Carlist Party (PC) | 620 | 0.18 | −0.03 | 0 | ±0 |
| National Democracy (DN) | 351 | 0.10 | New | 0 | ±0 |
| Spain 2000 (E–2000) | 221 | 0.07 | −0.02 | 0 | ±0 |
| The Phalanx (FE) | 195 | 0.06 | −0.09 | 0 | ±0 |
| Republican Social Movement (MSR) | 173 | 0.05 | New | 0 | ±0 |
| Blank ballots | 6,739 | 1.98 | −1.97 | | |
| Total | 339,508 | | | 5 | ±0 |
| Valid votes | 339,508 | 95.54 | −3.22 | | |
| Invalid votes | 15,831 | 4.46 | +3.22 | | |
| Votes cast / turnout | 355,339 | 76.22 | +10.15 | | |
| Abstentions | 110,842 | 23.78 | −10.15 | | |
| Registered voters | 466,181 | | | | |
Sources
Footnotes: ^{1} Navarre Yes results are compared to the combined totals of Basque Solidarity and Basque Nationalist Party in the 2000 election.

=== Valencian Community ===
← Summary of the 14 March 2004 Congress of Deputies election results in the Valencian Community →
| Parties and alliances | Popular vote | | | Seats | |
| Parties and alliances | Votes | % | ±pp | Total | +/− |
|---|---|---|---|---|---|
| People's Party (PP) | 1,242,800 | 46.78 | −5.33 | 17 | −2 |
| Spanish Socialist Workers' Party (PSOE) | 1,127,700 | 42.45 | +8.45 | 14 | +2 |
| United Left–The Agreement+Republican Left (Entesa+IR) | 123,611 | 4.65 | −1.17 | 1 | ±0 |
| Valencian Nationalist Bloc–Green Left (Bloc–EV) | 40,759 | 1.53 | −0.88 | 0 | ±0 |
| The Eco-pacifist Greens (LVEP) | 21,515 | 0.81 | −0.10 | 0 | ±0 |
| Cannabis Party for Legalization and Normalization (PCLyN) | 15,067 | 0.57 | New | 0 | ±0 |
| Republican Left of the Valencian Country (ERPV) | 13,294 | 0.50 | +0.37 | 0 | ±0 |
| Citizens for Blank Votes (CenB) | 6,022 | 0.23 | New | 0 | ±0 |
| Democratic and Social Centre (CDS) | 4,985 | 0.19 | +0.11 | 0 | ±0 |
| Family and Life Party (PFyV) | 3,179 | 0.12 | New | 0 | ±0 |
| Spain 2000 (E–2000) | 2,721 | 0.10 | +0.04 | 0 | ±0 |
| Communist Party of the Peoples of Spain (PCPE) | 2,332 | 0.09 | −0.04 | 0 | ±0 |
| Kingdom of Valencia Identity (IRV) | 2,111 | 0.08 | New | 0 | ±0 |
| Humanist Party (PH) | 1,861 | 0.07 | +0.01 | 0 | ±0 |
| National Democracy (DN) | 1,788 | 0.07 | New | 0 | ±0 |
| Spanish Phalanx of the CNSO (FE de las JONS)^{1} | 1,251 | 0.05 | +0.02 | 0 | ±0 |
| Independent Social Democratic Party of the Valencian Community (PSICV) | 1,096 | 0.04 | New | 0 | ±0 |
| Republican Party (PRF) | 1,051 | 0.04 | New | 0 | ±0 |
| Internationalist Socialist Workers' Party (POSI) | 1,007 | 0.04 | −0.07 | 0 | ±0 |
| Authentic Phalanx (FA) | 1,000 | 0.04 | New | 0 | ±0 |
| The Phalanx (FE) | 959 | 0.04 | −0.02 | 0 | ±0 |
| Spanish Democratic Party (PADE) | 663 | 0.02 | −0.03 | 0 | ±0 |
| Republican Social Movement (MSR) | 485 | 0.02 | New | 0 | ±0 |
| Liberal Centrist Union (UCL) | 248 | 0.01 | New | 0 | ±0 |
| Spanish Democratic Front (FDE) | 242 | 0.01 | New | 0 | ±0 |
| Blank ballots | 38,805 | 1.46 | +0.26 | | |
| Total | 2,656,552 | | | 32 | ±0 |
| Valid votes | 2,656,552 | 99.35 | ±0.00 | | |
| Invalid votes | 17,468 | 0.65 | ±0.00 | | |
| Votes cast / turnout | 2,674,020 | 77.71 | +5.01 | | |
| Abstentions | 766,872 | 22.29 | −5.01 | | |
| Registered voters | 3,440,892 | | | | |
Sources
Footnotes: ^{1} Spanish Phalanx of the CNSO results are compared to Independent Spanish Phalanx–Phalanx 2000 totals in the 2000 election.

== Autonomous cities ==
=== Ceuta ===
← Summary of the 14 March 2004 Congress of Deputies election results in Ceuta →
| Parties and alliances | Popular vote | | | Seats | |
| Parties and alliances | Votes | % | ±pp | Total | +/− |
|---|---|---|---|---|---|
| People's Party (PP) | 21,142 | 59.24 | +11.65 | 1 | ±0 |
| Spanish Socialist Workers' Party (PSOE) | 12,769 | 35.78 | +17.78 | 0 | ±0 |
| Socialist Party of the People of Ceuta (PSPC) | 807 | 2.26 | −0.32 | 0 | ±0 |
| United Left (IU) | 218 | 0.61 | −0.14 | 0 | ±0 |
| The Phalanx (FE) | 116 | 0.33 | +0.03 | 0 | ±0 |
| National Democracy (DN) | 62 | 0.17 | New | 0 | ±0 |
| Republican Left (IR) | 37 | 0.10 | New | 0 | ±0 |
| Spanish Democratic Party (PADE) | 25 | 0.07 | −0.01 | 0 | ±0 |
| Blank ballots | 515 | 1.44 | −0.19 | | |
| Total | 35,691 | | | 1 | ±0 |
| Valid votes | 35,691 | 99.11 | +0.08 | | |
| Invalid votes | 319 | 0.89 | −0.08 | | |
| Votes cast / turnout | 36,010 | 63.45 | +8.30 | | |
| Abstentions | 20,741 | 36.55 | −8.30 | | |
| Registered voters | 56,751 | | | | |

=== Melilla ===
← Summary of the 14 March 2004 Congress of Deputies election results in Melilla →
| Parties and alliances | Popular vote | | | Seats | |
| Parties and alliances | Votes | % | ±pp | Total | +/− |
|---|---|---|---|---|---|
| People's Party (PP) | 14,856 | 54.60 | +4.80 | 1 | ±0 |
| Spanish Socialist Workers' Party (PSOE) | 11,273 | 41.43 | +21.01 | 0 | ±0 |
| United Left (IU) | 229 | 0.84 | −0.67 | 0 | ±0 |
| The Greens–Green Group (LV–GV) | 135 | 0.50 | −0.16 | 0 | ±0 |
| Democratic and Social Centre (CDS) | 89 | 0.33 | New | 0 | ±0 |
| Republican Left (IR) | 57 | 0.21 | New | 0 | ±0 |
| The Phalanx (FE) | 46 | 0.17 | −0.01 | 0 | ±0 |
| Spanish Democratic Party (PADE) | 35 | 0.13 | +0.08 | 0 | ±0 |
| National Democracy (DN) | 30 | 0.11 | New | 0 | ±0 |
| Spain 2000 (E–2000) | 22 | 0.08 | New | 0 | ±0 |
| Blank ballots | 435 | 1.60 | −0.50 | | |
| Total | 27,207 | | | 1 | ±0 |
| Valid votes | 27,207 | 99.18 | −0.10 | | |
| Invalid votes | 225 | 0.82 | +0.10 | | |
| Votes cast / turnout | 27,432 | 55.84 | +1.84 | | |
| Abstentions | 21,697 | 44.16 | −1.84 | | |
| Registered voters | 49,129 | | | | |
