= Results of the 2000 Spanish Congress election =

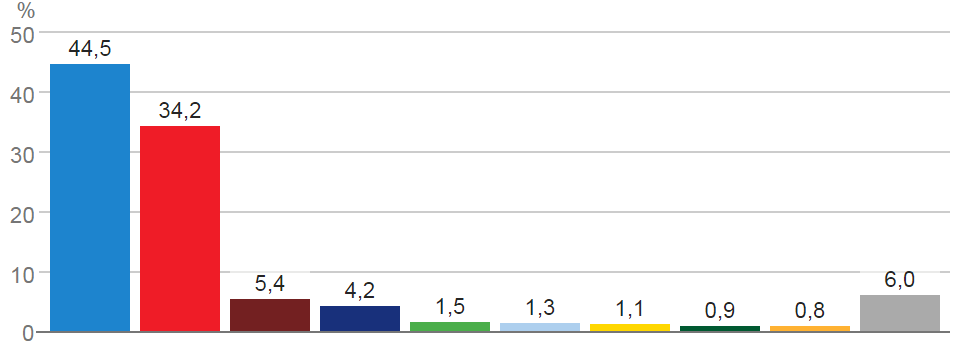
| (Spain) | Main: 2000 Spanish general election |
← 1996 12 March 2000 2004 →
| Party | | Votes | % | Seats |
| | PP | 10,321,178 | 44.5% | 183 |
| | PSOE–p | 7,918,752 | 34.2% | 125 |
| | IU | 1,263,043 | 5.4% | 8 |
| | CiU | 970,421 | 4.2% | 15 |
| | EAJ/PNV | 353,953 | 1.5% | 7 |
| | BNG | 306,268 | 1.3% | 3 |
| | CC | 248,261 | 1.1% | 4 |
| | PA | 206,255 | 0.9% | 1 |
| | ERC | 194,715 | 0.8% | 1 |
| | Others | 1,398,444 | 6.0% | 3 |
| Total | | 23,181,290 | 100.0% | 350 |

This article presents the results breakdown of the election to the Congress of Deputies held in Spain on 12 March 2000. The following tables show detailed results in each of the country's 17 autonomous communities and in the autonomous cities of Ceuta and Melilla, as well as a summary of constituency and regional results.

== Nationwide ==
← Summary of the 12 March 2000 Congress of Deputies election results →
| Parties and alliances | Popular vote | | | Seats | |
| Parties and alliances | Votes | % | ±pp | Total | +/− |
|---|---|---|---|---|---|
| People's Party (PP) | 10,321,178 | 44.52 | +5.73 | 183 | +27 |
| Spanish Socialist Workers' Party–Progressives (PSOE–p) | 7,918,752 | 34.16 | −3.47 | 125 | −16 |
| United Left (IU)^{1} | 1,263,043 | 5.45 | −3.90 | 8 | −11 |
| Convergence and Union (CiU) | 970,421 | 4.19 | −0.41 | 15 | −1 |
| Basque Nationalist Party (EAJ/PNV) | 353,953 | 1.53 | +0.26 | 7 | +2 |
| Galician Nationalist Bloc (BNG) | 306,268 | 1.32 | +0.44 | 3 | +1 |
| Canarian Coalition (CC) | 248,261 | 1.07 | +0.19 | 4 | ±0 |
| Andalusian Party (PA) | 206,255 | 0.89 | +0.35 | 1 | +1 |
| Republican Left of Catalonia (ERC) | 194,715 | 0.84 | +0.17 | 1 | ±0 |
| Initiative for Catalonia–Greens (IC–V)^{2} | 119,290 | 0.51 | −0.68 | 1 | −1 |
| Basque Solidarity (EA) | 100,742 | 0.43 | −0.03 | 1 | ±0 |
| Aragonese Union (CHA) | 75,356 | 0.33 | +0.13 | 1 | +1 |
| Liberal Independent Group (GIL) | 72,162 | 0.31 | New | 0 | ±0 |
| The Greens (Verdes)^{3} | 70,906 | 0.31 | +0.15 | 0 | ±0 |
| Valencian Nationalist Bloc–The Greens–Valencians for Change (BNV–EV)^{4} | 58,551 | 0.25 | +0.06 | 0 | ±0 |
| Valencian Union (UV) | 57,830 | 0.25 | −0.12 | 0 | −1 |
| Leonese People's Union (UPL) | 41,690 | 0.18 | +0.13 | 0 | ±0 |
| Aragonese Party (PAR) | 38,883 | 0.17 | New | 0 | ±0 |
| Centrist Union–Democratic and Social Centre (UC–CDS) | 23,576 | 0.10 | −0.08 | 0 | ±0 |
| PSM–Nationalist Agreement (PSM–EN) | 23,482 | 0.10 | ±0.00 | 0 | ±0 |
| The Eco-pacifist Greens (LVEP) | 22,220 | 0.10 | New | 0 | ±0 |
| The Greens of the Community of Madrid (LVCM) | 21,087 | 0.09 | +0.06 | 0 | ±0 |
| The Greens–Green Group (LV–GV) | 20,618 | 0.09 | +0.02 | 0 | ±0 |
| Humanist Party (PH) | 19,683 | 0.08 | +0.03 | 0 | ±0 |
| Commoners' Land–Castilian Nationalist Party (TC–PNC) | 18,290 | 0.08 | +0.06 | 0 | ±0 |
| Natural Law Party (PLN) | 17,372 | 0.07 | New | 0 | ±0 |
| The Phalanx (FE) | 14,431 | 0.06 | New | 0 | ±0 |
| Asturian Renewal Union (URAS) | 13,360 | 0.06 | New | 0 | ±0 |
| Communist Party of the Peoples of Spain (PCPE) | 12,898 | 0.06 | ±0.00 | 0 | ±0 |
| Internationalist Socialist Workers' Party (POSI)^{5} | 12,208 | 0.05 | +0.04 | 0 | ±0 |
| The Greens–Green Alternative (EV–AV) | 11,579 | 0.05 | New | 0 | ±0 |
| Lanzarote Independents Party (PIL) | 10,323 | 0.04 | New | 0 | ±0 |
| Spain 2000 Platform (ES2000) | 9,562 | 0.04 | New | 0 | ±0 |
| Spanish Democratic Party (PADE) | 9,136 | 0.04 | New | 0 | ±0 |
| Convergence of Democrats of Navarre (CDN) | 8,646 | 0.04 | −0.03 | 0 | ±0 |
| Majorcan Union–Independents of Menorca (UM–INME) | 8,372 | 0.04 | +0.01 | 0 | ±0 |
| Andalusian Left (IA) | 8,175 | 0.04 | New | 0 | ±0 |
| Independent Spanish Phalanx–Phalanx 2000 (FEI–FE 2000) | 6,621 | 0.03 | +0.02 | 0 | ±0 |
| Localist Bloc of Melilla (BLM) | 6,514 | 0.03 | New | 0 | ±0 |
| Riojan Party (PR) | 6,155 | 0.03 | +0.01 | 0 | ±0 |
| Asturianist Party (PAS) | 5,876 | 0.03 | −0.02 | 0 | ±0 |
| Regionalist Unity of Castile and León (URCL) | 5,683 | 0.02 | ±0.00 | 0 | ±0 |
| United Extremadura (EU) | 4,771 | 0.02 | New | 0 | ±0 |
| Party of Self-employed and Professionals (AUTONOMO) | 4,218 | 0.02 | New | 0 | ±0 |
| Independent Candidacy–The Party of Castile and León (CI–PCL) | 4,184 | 0.02 | New | 0 | ±0 |
| Catalan State (EC) | 3,356 | 0.01 | New | 0 | ±0 |
| Andalusian Nation (NA) | 3,262 | 0.01 | ±0.00 | 0 | ±0 |
| Galician Democracy (DG) | 2,958 | 0.01 | New | 0 | ±0 |
| Republican Action (AR) | 2,858 | 0.01 | +0.01 | 0 | ±0 |
| Party of the Democratic Karma (PKD) | 2,759 | 0.01 | New | 0 | ±0 |
| Andalusia Assembly (A) | 2,727 | 0.01 | New | 0 | ±0 |
| Party of Self-employed, Retirees and Independents (EL–PAPI) | 2,713 | 0.01 | New | 0 | ±0 |
| Extremaduran Coalition (PREx–CREx) | 2,371 | 0.01 | −0.02 | 0 | ±0 |
| Galician Coalition (CG) | 2,361 | 0.01 | New | 0 | ±0 |
| Zamoran People's Union (UPZ) | 2,347 | 0.01 | New | 0 | ±0 |
| Galician People's Front (FPG) | 2,252 | 0.01 | ±0.00 | 0 | ±0 |
| Carlist Party (PC) | 2,131 | 0.01 | New | 0 | ±0 |
| Salamanca–Zamora–León–PREPAL (PREPAL) | 2,118 | 0.01 | ±0.00 | 0 | ±0 |
| Cantabrian Nationalist Council (CNC) | 2,103 | 0.01 | New | 0 | ±0 |
| Andecha Astur (AA) | 2,036 | 0.01 | New | 0 | ±0 |
| Self-employed Spanish Party (PEDA) | 1,904 | 0.01 | New | 0 | ±0 |
| Internationalist Struggle (LI (LIT–CI)) | 1,716 | 0.01 | New | 0 | ±0 |
| Party Association of Widows and Legal Wives (PAVIEL) | 1,690 | 0.01 | New | 0 | ±0 |
| Republican Left–Left Republican Party (IR–PRE) | 1,541 | 0.01 | New | 0 | ±0 |
| Party of Self-employed, Retirees and Widows (PAE) | 1,462 | 0.01 | +0.01 | 0 | ±0 |
| Independent Salamancan Union (USI) | 1,416 | 0.01 | New | 0 | ±0 |
| Independent Socialists of Extremadura (SIEx) | 1,412 | 0.01 | ±0.00 | 0 | ±0 |
| Madrilenian Independent Regional Party (PRIM) | 1,363 | 0.01 | ±0.00 | 0 | ±0 |
| Caló Nationalist Party (PNCA) | 1,331 | 0.01 | New | 0 | ±0 |
| Party of El Bierzo (PB) | 1,191 | 0.01 | +0.01 | 0 | ±0 |
| Asturian Left Bloc (BIA) | 1,085 | 0.00 | New | 0 | ±0 |
| Aragonese Initiative (INAR) | 1,057 | 0.00 | New | 0 | ±0 |
| Progressives of Canaries Unity (UP–CAN) | 980 | 0.00 | New | 0 | ±0 |
| Valencian Nationalist Left (ENV) | 920 | 0.00 | ±0.00 | 0 | ±0 |
| Almerian Regionalist Union (URAL) | 838 | 0.00 | New | 0 | ±0 |
| Socialist Party of the People of Ceuta (PSPC) | 788 | 0.00 | −0.01 | 0 | ±0 |
| European Nation State (N) | 710 | 0.00 | ±0.00 | 0 | ±0 |
| Liberal and Social Democratic Coalition (CSD–L) | 650 | 0.00 | New | 0 | ±0 |
| Citizens' Convergence of the South-East (CCSE) | 645 | 0.00 | New | 0 | ±0 |
| Federal Progressives (PF) | 609 | 0.00 | New | 0 | ±0 |
| New Region (NR) | 598 | 0.00 | −0.01 | 0 | ±0 |
| Christian Positivist Party (PPCr) | 546 | 0.00 | New | 0 | ±0 |
| Balearic People's Union (UPB) | 524 | 0.00 | New | 0 | ±0 |
| Voice of the Andalusian People (VDPA) | 493 | 0.00 | ±0.00 | 0 | ±0 |
| Independent Initiative (II) | 425 | 0.00 | New | 0 | ±0 |
| Regionalist Party of Guadalajara (PRGU) | 400 | 0.00 | ±0.00 | 0 | ±0 |
| Iberian Union (UNIB) | 388 | 0.00 | New | 0 | ±0 |
| New Force (FN) | 343 | 0.00 | New | 0 | ±0 |
| Social and Autonomist Liberal Group (ALAS) | 339 | 0.00 | ±0.00 | 0 | ±0 |
| Balearic Islands Renewal Party (PRIB) | 334 | 0.00 | New | 0 | ±0 |
| Pensionist Assembly of the Canaries (TPC) | 319 | 0.00 | New | 0 | ±0 |
| National Union (UN) | 314 | 0.00 | New | 0 | ±0 |
| Cives (Cives) | 206 | 0.00 | New | 0 | ±0 |
| Movement for Humanist Socialism (MASH) | 121 | 0.00 | New | 0 | ±0 |
| Democratic Party of the People (PDEP) | 85 | 0.00 | New | 0 | ±0 |
| Nationalist Aprome (Aprome) | 60 | 0.00 | New | 0 | ±0 |
| Basque Citizens (EH)^{6} | 0 | 0.00 | −0.72 | 0 | −2 |
| Blank ballots | 366,823 | 1.58 | +0.61 | | |
| Total | 23,181,290 | | | 350 | ±0 |
| Valid votes | 23,181,290 | 99.32 | −0.18 | | |
| Invalid votes | 158,200 | 0.68 | +0.18 | | |
| Votes cast / turnout | 23,339,490 | 68.71 | −8.67 | | |
| Abstentions | 10,630,150 | 31.29 | +8.67 | | |
| Registered voters | 33,969,640 | | | | |
Sources
Footnotes: ^{1} United Left does not include Initiative for Catalonia results in Catalonia.; ^{2} Initiative for Catalonia–Greens results are compared to Initiative for Catalonia totals in the 1996 election, only in Catalonia.; ^{3} The Greens does not include results in the Valencian Community.; ^{4} Valencian Nationalist Bloc–The Greens–Valencians for Change results are compared to the combined totals of Valencian People's Union–Nationalist Bloc and The Greens of the Valencian Country in the 1996 election.; ^{5} Internationalist Socialist Workers' Party results are compared to Republican Coalition totals in the 1996 election.; ^{6} Basque Citizens results are compared to Popular Unity totals in the 1996 election. EH called for election boycott and urged its supporters to abstain.

== Summary ==
=== Constituencies ===

Summary of constituency results in the 12 March 2000 Congress of Deputies election
| Constituency | PP | | PSOE–p | | IU | | CiU | | PNV | | BNG | | CC | | PA | | ERC | | IC–V | | EA | | CHA | |
| Constituency | % | S | % | S | % | S | % | S | % | S | % | S | % | S | % | S | % | S | % | S | % | S | % | S |
|---|---|---|---|---|---|---|---|---|---|---|---|---|---|---|---|---|---|---|---|---|---|---|---|---|
| A Coruña | 51.9 | 5 | 24.8 | 2 | 1.4 | − | | | | | 19.3 | 2 | | | | | | | | | | | | |
| Álava | 39.1 | 2 | 24.3 | 1 | 5.6 | − | | | 20.7 | 1 | | | | | | | | | | | 4.7 | − | | |
| Albacete | 51.2 | 2 | 41.2 | 2 | 5.0 | − | | | | | | | | | | | | | | | | | | |
| Alicante | 54.3 | 7 | 34.8 | 4 | 5.3 | − | | | | | | | | | | | 0.1 | − | | | | | | |
| Almería | 48.7 | 3 | 42.3 | 2 | 4.2 | − | | | | | | | | | 2.4 | − | | | | | | | | |
| Asturias | 46.3 | 5 | 37.0 | 3 | 10.3 | 1 | | | | | | | | | | | | | | | | | | |
| Ávila | 65.3 | 2 | 26.7 | 1 | 4.8 | − | | | | | | | | | | | | | | | | | | |
| Badajoz | 47.0 | 3 | 44.8 | 3 | 5.4 | − | | | | | | | | | | | | | | | | | | |
| Balearic Islands | 53.9 | 5 | 29.3 | 2 | 4.0 | − | | | | | | | | | | | 0.3 | − | | | | | | |
| Barcelona | 23.5 | 8 | 35.5 | 12 | 2.5 | − | 26.3 | 9 | | | | | | | | | 5.1 | 1 | 4.1 | 1 | | | | |
| Biscay | 27.3 | 3 | 22.9 | 2 | 5.8 | − | | | 34.2 | 4 | | | | | | | | | | | 5.1 | − | | |
| Burgos | 58.4 | 3 | 29.0 | 1 | 4.6 | − | | | | | | | | | | | | | | | | | | |
| Cáceres | 47.8 | 3 | 44.6 | 2 | 3.7 | − | | | | | | | | | | | | | | | | | | |
| Cádiz | 41.2 | 4 | 39.4 | 4 | 6.7 | − | | | | | | | | | 9.9 | 1 | | | | | | | | |
| Cantabria | 56.8 | 3 | 33.5 | 2 | 5.0 | − | | | | | | | | | | | | | | | | | | |
| Castellón | 53.8 | 3 | 35.3 | 2 | 3.8 | − | | | | | | | | | | | 0.2 | − | | | | | | |
| Ceuta | 47.6 | 1 | 18.0 | − | 0.8 | − | | | | | | | | | | | | | | | | | | |
| Ciudad Real | 51.7 | 3 | 42.6 | 2 | 3.7 | − | | | | | | | | | | | | | | | | | | |
| Córdoba | 40.9 | 3 | 40.5 | 3 | 11.9 | 1 | | | | | | | | | 4.5 | − | | | | | | | | |
| Cuenca | 53.4 | 2 | 41.2 | 1 | 2.9 | − | | | | | | | | | | | | | | | | | | |
| Girona | 15.9 | 1 | 28.4 | 2 | 1.5 | − | 41.0 | 2 | | | | | | | | | 8.7 | − | 1.8 | − | | | | |
| Granada | 42.7 | 3 | 44.4 | 4 | 7.2 | − | | | | | | | | | 3.5 | − | | | | | | | | |
| Guadalajara | 54.4 | 2 | 36.1 | 1 | 5.8 | − | | | | | | | | | | | | | | | | | | |
| Guipúzcoa | 24.6 | 2 | 23.7 | 1 | 4.7 | − | | | 27.7 | 2 | | | | | | | | | | | 14.1 | 1 | | |
| Huelva | 40.2 | 2 | 46.9 | 3 | 6.4 | − | | | | | | | | | 4.7 | − | | | | | | | | |
| Huesca | 45.1 | 2 | 37.1 | 1 | 3.1 | − | | | | | | | | | | | | | | | | | 5.5 | − |
| Jaén | 40.3 | 3 | 47.7 | 3 | 7.1 | − | | | | | | | | | 3.3 | − | | | | | | | | |
| La Rioja | 54.1 | 3 | 34.9 | 1 | 4.0 | − | | | | | | | | | | | | | | | | | | |
| Las Palmas | 48.0 | 4 | 18.4 | 1 | 2.5 | − | | | | | | | 25.8 | 2 | | | | | | | | | | |
| León | 48.8 | 3 | 32.0 | 2 | 3.6 | − | | | | | | | | | | | | | | | | | | |
| Lleida | 21.0 | 1 | 27.6 | 1 | 1.0 | − | 39.0 | 2 | | | | | | | | | 7.2 | − | 1.8 | − | | | | |
| Lugo | 58.0 | 3 | 22.9 | 1 | 1.0 | − | | | | | 16.2 | − | | | | | | | | | | | | |
| Madrid | 52.5 | 19 | 33.1 | 12 | 9.1 | 3 | | | | | | | | | | | | | | | | | | |
| Málaga | 43.5 | 5 | 39.1 | 4 | 8.1 | 1 | | | | | | | | | 5.2 | − | | | | | | | | |
| Melilla | 49.8 | 1 | 20.4 | − | 1.5 | − | | | | | | | | | | | | | | | | | | |
| Murcia | 58.1 | 6 | 32.4 | 3 | 6.2 | − | | | | | | | | | | | | | | | | | | |
| Navarre | 49.9 | 3 | 27.3 | 2 | 7.6 | − | | | 2.2 | − | | | | | | | | | | | 4.7 | − | | |
| Ourense | 57.2 | 3 | 23.1 | 1 | 0.7 | − | | | | | 17.0 | − | | | | | | | | | | | | |
| Palencia | 55.5 | 2 | 35.8 | 1 | 4.2 | − | | | | | | | | | | | | | | | | | | |
| Pontevedra | 53.4 | 5 | 23.0 | 2 | 1.5 | − | | | | | 19.6 | 1 | | | | | | | | | | | | |
| Salamanca | 58.5 | 3 | 32.7 | 1 | 3.7 | − | | | | | | | | | | | | | | | | | | |
| Santa Cruz de Tenerife | 35.0 | 3 | 26.3 | 2 | 2.3 | − | | | | | | | 33.7 | 2 | | | | | | | | | | |
| Segovia | 57.5 | 2 | 30.8 | 1 | 5.2 | − | | | | | | | | | | | | | | | | | | |
| Seville | 35.0 | 5 | 49.0 | 7 | 8.3 | 1 | | | | | | | | | 5.1 | − | | | | | | | | |
| Soria | 58.5 | 2 | 32.0 | 1 | 4.3 | − | | | | | | | | | | | | | | | | | | |
| Tarragona | 24.3 | 2 | 32.4 | 2 | 1.4 | − | 31.1 | 2 | | | | | | | | | 6.1 | − | 2.1 | − | | | | |
| Teruel | 47.9 | 2 | 33.8 | 1 | 2.9 | − | | | | | | | | | | | | | | | | | 3.4 | − |
| Toledo | 52.7 | 3 | 40.3 | 2 | 4.6 | − | | | | | | | | | | | | | | | | | | |
| Valencia | 50.5 | 9 | 33.2 | 6 | 6.5 | 1 | | | | | | | | | | | 0.1 | − | | | | | | |
| Valladolid | 53.1 | 3 | 35.1 | 2 | 6.1 | − | | | | | | | | | | | | | | | | | | |
| Zamora | 58.8 | 2 | 32.4 | 1 | 2.8 | − | | | | | | | | | | | | | | | | | | |
| Zaragoza | 47.6 | 4 | 29.2 | 2 | 3.7 | − | | | | | | | | | | | | | | | | | 12.8 | 1 |
| Total | 44.5 | 183 | 34.2 | 125 | 5.4 | 8 | 4.2 | 15 | 1.5 | 7 | 1.3 | 3 | 1.1 | 4 | 0.9 | 1 | 0.8 | 1 | 0.5 | 1 | 0.4 | 1 | 0.3 | 1 |

=== Regions ===

Summary of regional results in the 12 March 2000 Congress of Deputies election
| Region | PP | | PSOE–p | | IU | | CiU | | PNV | | BNG | | CC | | PA | | ERC | | IC–V | | EA | | CHA | |
| Region | % | S | % | S | % | S | % | S | % | S | % | S | % | S | % | S | % | S | % | S | % | S | % | S |
|---|---|---|---|---|---|---|---|---|---|---|---|---|---|---|---|---|---|---|---|---|---|---|---|---|
| Andalusia | 40.6 | 28 | 43.9 | 30 | 7.8 | 3 | | | | | | | | | 5.1 | 1 | | | | | | | | |
| Aragon | 47.2 | 8 | 31.1 | 4 | 3.5 | − | | | | | | | | | | | | | | | | | 10.4 | 1 |
| Asturias | 46.3 | 5 | 37.0 | 3 | 10.3 | 1 | | | | | | | | | | | | | | | | | | |
| Balearic Islands | 53.9 | 5 | 29.3 | 2 | 4.0 | − | | | | | | | | | | | 0.3 | − | | | | | | |
| Basque Country | 28.3 | 7 | 23.3 | 4 | 5.4 | − | | | 30.4 | 7 | | | | | | | | | | | 7.6 | 1 | | |
| Canary Islands | 41.8 | 7 | 22.2 | 3 | 2.4 | − | | | | | | | 29.6 | 4 | | | | | | | | | | |
| Cantabria | 56.8 | 3 | 33.5 | 2 | 5.0 | − | | | | | | | | | | | | | | | | | | |
| Castile and León | 55.7 | 22 | 32.2 | 11 | 4.4 | − | | | | | | | | | | | | | | | | | | |
| Castilla–La Mancha | 52.4 | 12 | 40.8 | 8 | 4.3 | − | | | | | | | | | | | | | | | | | | |
| Catalonia | 22.8 | 12 | 34.1 | 17 | 2.2 | − | 28.8 | 15 | | | | | | | | | 5.6 | 1 | 3.5 | 1 | | | | |
| Ceuta | 47.6 | 1 | 18.0 | − | 0.8 | − | | | | | | | | | | | | | | | | | | |
| Extremadura | 47.3 | 6 | 44.7 | 5 | 4.7 | − | | | | | | | | | | | | | | | | | | |
| Galicia | 54.0 | 16 | 23.7 | 6 | 1.3 | − | | | | | 18.6 | 3 | | | | | | | | | | | | |
| La Rioja | 54.1 | 3 | 34.9 | 1 | 4.0 | − | | | | | | | | | | | | | | | | | | |
| Madrid | 52.5 | 19 | 33.1 | 12 | 9.1 | 3 | | | | | | | | | | | | | | | | | | |
| Melilla | 49.8 | 1 | 20.4 | − | 1.5 | − | | | | | | | | | | | | | | | | | | |
| Murcia | 58.1 | 6 | 32.4 | 3 | 6.2 | − | | | | | | | | | | | | | | | | | | |
| Navarre | 49.9 | 3 | 27.3 | 2 | 7.6 | − | | | 2.2 | − | | | | | | | | | | | 4.7 | − | | |
| Valencian Community | 52.1 | 19 | 34.0 | 12 | 5.8 | 1 | | | | | | | | | | | 0.1 | – | | | | | | |
| Total | 44.5 | 183 | 34.2 | 125 | 5.4 | 8 | 4.2 | 15 | 1.5 | 7 | 1.3 | 3 | 1.1 | 4 | 0.9 | 1 | 0.8 | 1 | 0.5 | 1 | 0.4 | 1 | 0.3 | 1 |

== Autonomous communities ==
=== Andalusia ===
← Summary of the 12 March 2000 Congress of Deputies election results in Andalusia →
| Parties and alliances | Popular vote | | | Seats | |
| Parties and alliances | Votes | % | ±pp | Total | +/− |
|---|---|---|---|---|---|
| Spanish Socialist Workers' Party–Progressives (PSOE–p) | 1,771,968 | 43.86 | −2.80 | 30 | −2 |
| People's Party (PP) | 1,639,034 | 40.57 | +5.19 | 28 | +4 |
| United Left/The Greens–Assembly for Andalusia (IULV–CA) | 315,891 | 7.82 | −5.66 | 3 | −3 |
| Andalusian Party (PA) | 206,255 | 5.11 | +1.99 | 1 | +1 |
| Liberal Independent Group (GIL) | 16,123 | 0.40 | New | 0 | ±0 |
| Andalusian Left (IA) | 8,175 | 0.20 | New | 0 | ±0 |
| Communist Party of the Peoples of Spain (PCPE) | 3,559 | 0.09 | −0.03 | 0 | ±0 |
| Andalusian Nation (NA) | 3,262 | 0.08 | ±0.00 | 0 | ±0 |
| Humanist Party (PH) | 3,197 | 0.08 | +0.02 | 0 | ±0 |
| Andalusia Assembly (A) | 2,727 | 0.07 | New | 0 | ±0 |
| Natural Law Party (PLN) | 2,430 | 0.06 | New | 0 | ±0 |
| The Phalanx (FE) | 2,388 | 0.06 | New | 0 | ±0 |
| Centrist Union–Democratic and Social Centre (UC–CDS) | 2,074 | 0.05 | −0.02 | 0 | ±0 |
| Spain 2000 Platform (ES2000) | 1,584 | 0.04 | New | 0 | ±0 |
| Spanish Democratic Party (PADE) | 1,481 | 0.04 | New | 0 | ±0 |
| Independent Spanish Phalanx–Phalanx 2000 (FEI–FE 2000) | 1,203 | 0.03 | +0.02 | 0 | ±0 |
| Internationalist Socialist Workers' Party (POSI) | 921 | 0.02 | New | 0 | ±0 |
| Almerian Regionalist Union (URAL) | 838 | 0.02 | New | 0 | ±0 |
| Christian Positivist Party (PPCr) | 546 | 0.01 | New | 0 | ±0 |
| Voice of the Andalusian People (VDPA) | 493 | 0.01 | ±0.00 | 0 | ±0 |
| National Union (UN) | 314 | 0.00 | New | 0 | ±0 |
| Republican Action (AR) | 303 | 0.01 | New | 0 | ±0 |
| Blank ballots | 55,486 | 1.37 | +0.54 | | |
| Total | 4,040,252 | | | 62 | ±0 |
| Valid votes | 4,040,252 | 99.30 | −0.12 | | |
| Invalid votes | 28,541 | 0.70 | +0.12 | | |
| Votes cast / turnout | 4,068,793 | 68.77 | −9.23 | | |
| Abstentions | 1,847,990 | 31.23 | +9.23 | | |
| Registered voters | 5,916,783 | | | | |

=== Aragon ===
← Summary of the 12 March 2000 Congress of Deputies election results in Aragon →
| Parties and alliances | Popular vote | | | Seats | |
| Parties and alliances | Votes | % | ±pp | Total | +/− |
|---|---|---|---|---|---|
| People's Party (PP) | 341,396 | 47.23 | −0.69 | 8 | ±0 |
| Spanish Socialist Workers' Party–Progressives (PSOE–p) | 224,650 | 31.08 | −3.56 | 4 | −1 |
| Aragonese Union (CHA) | 75,356 | 10.42 | +4.00 | 1 | +1 |
| Aragonese Party (PAR) | 38,883 | 5.38 | New | 0 | ±0 |
| United Left of Aragon (IU) | 25,395 | 3.51 | −5.63 | 0 | ±0 |
| The Greens–Green Group–SOS Nature (LV–GV) | 3,774 | 0.52 | +0.16 | 0 | ±0 |
| Aragonese Initiative (INAR) | 1,057 | 0.15 | New | 0 | ±0 |
| The Phalanx (FE) | 374 | 0.05 | New | 0 | ±0 |
| Humanist Party (PH) | 348 | 0.05 | +0.01 | 0 | ±0 |
| Natural Law Party (PLN) | 283 | 0.04 | New | 0 | ±0 |
| Spain 2000 Platform (ES2000) | 205 | 0.03 | New | 0 | ±0 |
| Centrist Union–Democratic and Social Centre (UC–CDS) | 194 | 0.03 | −0.04 | 0 | ±0 |
| Independent Spanish Phalanx–Phalanx 2000 (FEI–FE 2000) | 192 | 0.03 | New | 0 | ±0 |
| Catalan State (EC) | 162 | 0.02 | New | 0 | ±0 |
| Spanish Democratic Party (PADE) | 118 | 0.02 | New | 0 | ±0 |
| Blank ballots | 10,473 | 1.45 | +0.24 | | |
| Total | 722,860 | | | 13 | ±0 |
| Valid votes | 722,860 | 99.29 | −0.22 | | |
| Invalid votes | 5,200 | 0.71 | +0.22 | | |
| Votes cast / turnout | 728,060 | 71.39 | −6.07 | | |
| Abstentions | 291,785 | 28.61 | +6.07 | | |
| Registered voters | 1,019,845 | | | | |

=== Asturias ===
← Summary of the 12 March 2000 Congress of Deputies election results in Asturias →
| Parties and alliances | Popular vote | | | Seats | |
| Parties and alliances | Votes | % | ±pp | Total | +/− |
|---|---|---|---|---|---|
| People's Party (PP) | 302,626 | 46.33 | +5.30 | 5 | +1 |
| Spanish Socialist Workers' Party–Progressives (PSOE–p) | 241,830 | 37.02 | −2.83 | 3 | −1 |
| United Left (IU) | 67,024 | 10.26 | −5.25 | 1 | ±0 |
| Asturian Renewal Union (URAS) | 13,360 | 2.05 | New | 0 | ±0 |
| Asturianist Party (PAS) | 5,876 | 0.90 | −0.79 | 0 | ±0 |
| The Greens of Asturias (Verdes) | 4,874 | 0.75 | +0.26 | 0 | ±0 |
| Andecha Astur (AA) | 2,036 | 0.31 | New | 0 | ±0 |
| Asturian Left Bloc (BIA) | 1,085 | 0.17 | New | 0 | ±0 |
| Party of Self-employed and Professionals (AUTONOMO) | 1,036 | 0.16 | New | 0 | ±0 |
| Centrist Union–Democratic and Social Centre (UC–CDS) | 658 | 0.10 | −0.14 | 0 | ±0 |
| Spain 2000 Platform (ES2000) | 607 | 0.09 | New | 0 | ±0 |
| Humanist Party (PH) | 329 | 0.05 | New | 0 | ±0 |
| The Phalanx (FE) | 295 | 0.05 | New | 0 | ±0 |
| Natural Law Party (PLN) | 280 | 0.04 | New | 0 | ±0 |
| Independent Spanish Phalanx–Phalanx 2000 (FEI–FE 2000) | 173 | 0.03 | New | 0 | ±0 |
| Spanish Democratic Party (PADE) | 160 | 0.02 | New | 0 | ±0 |
| Blank ballots | 10,985 | 1.68 | +0.74 | | |
| Total | 653,234 | | | 9 | ±0 |
| Valid votes | 653,234 | 99.34 | −0.18 | | |
| Invalid votes | 4,319 | 0.66 | +0.18 | | |
| Votes cast / turnout | 657,553 | 66.99 | −8.92 | | |
| Abstentions | 323,951 | 33.01 | +8.92 | | |
| Registered voters | 981,504 | | | | |

=== Balearic Islands ===
← Summary of the 12 March 2000 Congress of Deputies election results in the Balearic Islands →
| Parties and alliances | Popular vote | | | Seats | |
| Parties and alliances | Votes | % | ±pp | Total | +/− |
|---|---|---|---|---|---|
| People's Party (PP) | 214,348 | 53.87 | +7.46 | 5 | +1 |
| Spanish Socialist Workers' Party–Progressives (PSOE–p) | 116,515 | 29.28 | −6.67 | 2 | −1 |
| PSM–Nationalist Agreement (PSM–EN) | 23,482 | 5.90 | +0.19 | 0 | ±0 |
| United Left of the Balearic Islands (EU) | 15,928 | 4.00 | −3.69 | 0 | ±0 |
| The Greens of the Balearic Islands (EVIB) | 9,556 | 2.40 | +0.18 | 0 | ±0 |
| Majorcan Union–Independents of Menorca (UM–INME) | 8,372 | 2.10 | +0.49 | 0 | ±0 |
| Republican Left of Catalonia (ERC) | 1,340 | 0.34 | −0.08 | 0 | ±0 |
| Balearic People's Union (UPB) | 524 | 0.13 | New | 0 | ±0 |
| Workers for Democracy Coalition (TD) | 423 | 0.11 | +0.02 | 0 | ±0 |
| Centrist Union–Democratic and Social Centre (UC–CDS) | 341 | 0.09 | −0.01 | 0 | ±0 |
| Balearic Islands Renewal Party (PRIB) | 334 | 0.08 | New | 0 | ±0 |
| Spain 2000 Platform (ES2000) | 221 | 0.06 | New | 0 | ±0 |
| The Phalanx (FE) | 220 | 0.06 | New | 0 | ±0 |
| Independent Spanish Phalanx–Phalanx 2000 (FEI–FE 2000) | 182 | 0.05 | New | 0 | ±0 |
| Catalan State (EC) | 169 | 0.04 | New | 0 | ±0 |
| Blank ballots | 5,943 | 1.49 | +0.49 | | |
| Total | 397,898 | | | 7 | ±0 |
| Valid votes | 397,898 | 99.34 | −0.08 | | |
| Invalid votes | 2,661 | 0.66 | +0.08 | | |
| Votes cast / turnout | 400,559 | 61.43 | −10.20 | | |
| Abstentions | 251,450 | 38.57 | +10.20 | | |
| Registered voters | 652,009 | | | | |

=== Basque Country ===
← Summary of the 12 March 2000 Congress of Deputies election results in the Basque Country →
| Parties and alliances | Popular vote | | | Seats | |
| Parties and alliances | Votes | % | ±pp | Total | +/− |
|---|---|---|---|---|---|
| Basque Nationalist Party (EAJ/PNV) | 347,417 | 30.38 | +5.34 | 7 | +2 |
| People's Party (PP) | 323,235 | 28.26 | +9.92 | 7 | +2 |
| Socialist Party of the Basque Country–Basque Country Left (PSE–EE (PSOE)) | 266,583 | 23.31 | −0.36 | 4 | −1 |
| Basque Solidarity (EA) | 86,557 | 7.57 | −0.65 | 1 | ±0 |
| United Left (EB/IU) | 62,293 | 5.45 | −3.76 | 0 | −1 |
| The Greens (B/LV) | 10,121 | 0.88 | +0.40 | 0 | ±0 |
| Humanist Party (PH) | 3,058 | 0.27 | +0.19 | 0 | ±0 |
| Party of the Democratic Karma (PKD) | 2,759 | 0.24 | New | 0 | ±0 |
| Natural Law Party (PLN) | 2,378 | 0.21 | New | 0 | ±0 |
| Internationalist Socialist Workers' Party (POSI) | 1,297 | 0.11 | New | 0 | ±0 |
| Democratic and Social Centre–Centrist Union (CDS–UC) | 709 | 0.06 | −0.01 | 0 | ±0 |
| Communist Party of the Peoples of Spain (PCPE) | 534 | 0.05 | New | 0 | ±0 |
| Spain 2000 Platform (ES2000) | 502 | 0.04 | New | 0 | ±0 |
| Republican Action (AR) | 451 | 0.04 | New | 0 | ±0 |
| Carlist Party (EKA) | 430 | 0.04 | New | 0 | ±0 |
| The Phalanx (FE) | 410 | 0.04 | New | 0 | ±0 |
| Internationalist Struggle (LI (LIT–CI)) | 331 | 0.03 | New | 0 | ±0 |
| Independent Spanish Phalanx–Phalanx 2000 (FEI–FE 2000) | 254 | 0.02 | +0.01 | 0 | ±0 |
| Basque Citizens (EH)^{1} | 0 | 0.00 | −12.28 | 0 | −2 |
| Blank ballots | 34,381 | 3.01 | +1.46 | | |
| Total | 1,143,700 | | | 19 | ±0 |
| Valid votes | 1,143,700 | 98.94 | −0.37 | | |
| Invalid votes | 12,299 | 1.06 | +0.37 | | |
| Votes cast / turnout | 1,155,999 | 63.84 | −7.69 | | |
| Abstentions | 654,667 | 36.16 | +7.69 | | |
| Registered voters | 1,810,666 | | | | |
Sources
Footnotes: ^{1} Basque Citizens results are compared to Popular Unity totals in the 1996 election. EH called for election boycott and urged its supporters to abstain.

=== Canary Islands ===
← Summary of the 12 March 2000 Congress of Deputies election results in the Canary Islands →
| Parties and alliances | Popular vote | | | Seats | |
| Parties and alliances | Votes | % | ±pp | Total | +/− |
|---|---|---|---|---|---|
| People's Party (PP) | 351,110 | 41.81 | +4.19 | 7 | +2 |
| Canarian Coalition (CC) | 248,261 | 29.56 | +4.47 | 4 | ±0 |
| Spanish Socialist Workers' Party–Progressives (PSOE–p) | 186,363 | 22.19 | −7.78 | 3 | −2 |
| Canarian United Left (IUC) | 20,214 | 2.41 | −3.07 | 0 | ±0 |
| Lanzarote Independents Party (PIL) | 10,323 | 1.23 | New | 0 | ±0 |
| The Greens of Canaries (Verdes) | 10,302 | 1.23 | New | 0 | ±0 |
| Communist Party of the Canarian People (PCPC) | 1,408 | 0.17 | +0.04 | 0 | ±0 |
| Humanist Party (PH) | 1,131 | 0.13 | +0.05 | 0 | ±0 |
| Centrist Union–Democratic and Social Centre (UC–CDS) | 1,060 | 0.13 | ±0.00 | 0 | ±0 |
| Progressives of Canaries Unity (UP–CAN) | 980 | 0.12 | New | 0 | ±0 |
| The Phalanx (FE) | 809 | 0.10 | New | 0 | ±0 |
| Pensionist Assembly of the Canaries (TPC) | 319 | 0.04 | New | 0 | ±0 |
| Natural Law Party (PLN) | 301 | 0.04 | New | 0 | ±0 |
| Blank ballots | 7,233 | 0.86 | +0.29 | | |
| Total | 839,814 | | | 14 | ±0 |
| Valid votes | 839,814 | 99.35 | −0.23 | | |
| Invalid votes | 5,534 | 0.65 | +0.23 | | |
| Votes cast / turnout | 845,348 | 60.67 | −8.47 | | |
| Abstentions | 548,062 | 39.33 | +8.47 | | |
| Registered voters | 1,393,410 | | | | |

=== Cantabria ===
← Summary of the 12 March 2000 Congress of Deputies election results in Cantabria →
| Parties and alliances | Popular vote | | | Seats | |
| Parties and alliances | Votes | % | ±pp | Total | +/− |
|---|---|---|---|---|---|
| People's Party (PP) | 189,442 | 56.84 | +6.37 | 3 | ±0 |
| Spanish Socialist Workers' Party–Progressives (PSOE–p) | 111,556 | 33.47 | −2.14 | 2 | ±0 |
| United Left (IU) | 16,714 | 5.02 | −6.34 | 0 | ±0 |
| Cantabrian Nationalist Council (CNC) | 2,103 | 0.63 | New | 0 | ±0 |
| Liberal Independent Group (GIL) | 1,343 | 0.40 | New | 0 | ±0 |
| Centrist Union–Democratic and Social Centre (UC–CDS) | 743 | 0.22 | −0.18 | 0 | ±0 |
| Natural Law Party (PLN) | 598 | 0.18 | New | 0 | ±0 |
| Communist Party of the Peoples of Spain (PCPE) | 536 | 0.16 | −0.02 | 0 | ±0 |
| Humanist Party (PH) | 353 | 0.11 | −0.06 | 0 | ±0 |
| Internationalist Socialist Workers' Party (POSI) | 328 | 0.10 | New | 0 | ±0 |
| The Phalanx (FE) | 293 | 0.09 | New | 0 | ±0 |
| Independent Spanish Phalanx–Phalanx 2000 (FEI–FE 2000) | 194 | 0.06 | New | 0 | ±0 |
| Spain 2000 Platform (ES2000) | 183 | 0.05 | New | 0 | ±0 |
| Spanish Democratic Party (PADE) | 156 | 0.05 | New | 0 | ±0 |
| Blank ballots | 8,726 | 2.62 | +1.02 | | |
| Total | 333,268 | | | 5 | ±0 |
| Valid votes | 333,268 | 99.04 | −0.25 | | |
| Invalid votes | 3,240 | 0.96 | +0.25 | | |
| Votes cast / turnout | 336,508 | 71.81 | −7.50 | | |
| Abstentions | 132,099 | 28.19 | +7.50 | | |
| Registered voters | 468,607 | | | | |

=== Castile and León ===
← Summary of the 12 March 2000 Congress of Deputies election results in Castile and León →
| Parties and alliances | Popular vote | | | Seats | |
| Parties and alliances | Votes | % | ±pp | Total | +/− |
|---|---|---|---|---|---|
| People's Party (PP) | 876,670 | 55.68 | +3.48 | 22 | ±0 |
| Spanish Socialist Workers' Party–Progressives (PSOE–p) | 506,595 | 32.17 | −2.86 | 11 | ±0 |
| United Left (IU) | 69,835 | 4.44 | −4.69 | 0 | ±0 |
| Leonese People's Union (UPL) | 41,690 | 2.65 | +1.93 | 0 | ±0 |
| Commoners' Land–Castilian Nationalist Party (TC–PNC) | 15,414 | 0.98 | +0.67 | 0 | ±0 |
| Regionalist Unity of Castile and León (URCL) | 5,683 | 0.36 | +0.12 | 0 | ±0 |
| Centrist Union–Democratic and Social Centre (UC–CDS) | 5,353 | 0.34 | −0.10 | 0 | ±0 |
| Independent Candidacy–The Party of Castile and León (CI–PCL) | 4,184 | 0.27 | New | 0 | ±0 |
| Natural Law Party (PLN) | 2,618 | 0.17 | New | 0 | ±0 |
| Zamoran People's Union (UPZ) | 2,347 | 0.15 | New | 0 | ±0 |
| Salamanca–Zamora–León–PREPAL (PREPAL) | 2,118 | 0.13 | +0.01 | 0 | ±0 |
| Humanist Party (PH) | 1,592 | 0.10 | +0.01 | 0 | ±0 |
| Independent Salamancan Union (USI) | 1,416 | 0.09 | New | 0 | ±0 |
| The Phalanx (FE) | 1,348 | 0.09 | New | 0 | ±0 |
| Party of El Bierzo (PB) | 1,191 | 0.08 | +0.02 | 0 | ±0 |
| Spanish Democratic Party (PADE) | 1,156 | 0.07 | New | 0 | ±0 |
| The Greens–Green Group (LV–GV) | 1,143 | 0.07 | +0.02 | 0 | ±0 |
| Communist Party of the Peoples of Spain (PCPE) | 876 | 0.06 | +0.03 | 0 | ±0 |
| Spain 2000 Platform (ES2000) | 711 | 0.05 | New | 0 | ±0 |
| Independent Spanish Phalanx–Phalanx 2000 (FEI–FE 2000) | 557 | 0.04 | New | 0 | ±0 |
| Cives (Cives) | 206 | 0.01 | New | 0 | ±0 |
| Carlist Party (PC) | 119 | 0.01 | New | 0 | ±0 |
| Blank ballots | 31,679 | 2.01 | +0.66 | | |
| Total | 1,574,501 | | | 33 | ±0 |
| Valid votes | 1,574,501 | 99.22 | −0.16 | | |
| Invalid votes | 12,449 | 0.78 | +0.16 | | |
| Votes cast / turnout | 1,586,950 | 72.57 | −6.44 | | |
| Abstentions | 599,709 | 27.43 | +6.44 | | |
| Registered voters | 2,186,659 | | | | |

=== Castilla–La Mancha ===
← Summary of the 12 March 2000 Congress of Deputies election results in Castilla–La Mancha →
| Parties and alliances | Popular vote | | | Seats | |
| Parties and alliances | Votes | % | ±pp | Total | +/− |
|---|---|---|---|---|---|
| People's Party (PP) | 563,203 | 52.36 | +5.18 | 12 | +1 |
| Spanish Socialist Workers' Party–Progressives (PSOE–p) | 438,630 | 40.78 | −1.84 | 8 | −1 |
| United Left (IU) | 46,746 | 4.35 | −4.05 | 0 | ±0 |
| Liberal Independent Group (GIL) | 2,698 | 0.25 | New | 0 | ±0 |
| Natural Law Party (PLN) | 1,736 | 0.16 | New | 0 | ±0 |
| Commoners' Land–Castilian Nationalist Party (TC–PNC) | 1,612 | 0.15 | +0.07 | 0 | ±0 |
| Centrist Union–Democratic and Social Centre (UC–CDS) | 1,372 | 0.13 | −0.17 | 0 | ±0 |
| Humanist Party (PH) | 1,262 | 0.12 | +0.03 | 0 | ±0 |
| The Phalanx (FE) | 875 | 0.08 | New | 0 | ±0 |
| The Greens–Green Group (LV–GV) | 605 | 0.06 | New | 0 | ±0 |
| Spain 2000 Platform (ES2000) | 589 | 0.05 | New | 0 | ±0 |
| Spanish Democratic Party (PADE) | 573 | 0.05 | New | 0 | ±0 |
| Regionalist Party of Guadalajara (PRGU) | 400 | 0.04 | +0.01 | 0 | ±0 |
| Party of Self-employed, Retirees and Independents (EL–PAPI) | 377 | 0.04 | New | 0 | ±0 |
| Party of Self-employed, Retirees and Widows (PAE) | 268 | 0.02 | New | 0 | ±0 |
| Independent Spanish Phalanx–Phalanx 2000 (FEI–FE 2000) | 130 | 0.01 | New | 0 | ±0 |
| Carlist Party (PC) | 97 | 0.01 | New | 0 | ±0 |
| Republican Action (AR) | 61 | 0.01 | New | 0 | ±0 |
| Blank ballots | 14,328 | 1.33 | +0.43 | | |
| Total | 1,075,571 | | | 20 | ±0 |
| Valid votes | 1,075,571 | 99.20 | −0.17 | | |
| Invalid votes | 8,665 | 0.80 | +0.17 | | |
| Votes cast / turnout | 1,084,236 | 76.31 | −6.78 | | |
| Abstentions | 336,658 | 23.69 | +6.78 | | |
| Registered voters | 1,420,894 | | | | |

=== Catalonia ===
← Summary of the 12 March 2000 Congress of Deputies election results in Catalonia →
| Parties and alliances | Popular vote | | | Seats | |
| Parties and alliances | Votes | % | ±pp | Total | +/− |
|---|---|---|---|---|---|
| Socialists' Party of Catalonia (PSC–PSOE) | 1,150,533 | 34.13 | −5.23 | 17 | −2 |
| Convergence and Union (CiU) | 970,421 | 28.79 | −0.82 | 15 | −1 |
| People's Party (PP) | 768,318 | 22.79 | +4.83 | 12 | +4 |
| Republican Left of Catalonia (ERC) | 190,292 | 5.64 | +1.46 | 1 | ±0 |
| Initiative for Catalonia–Greens (IC–V) | 119,290 | 3.54 | −4.10 | 1 | −1 |
| United and Alternative Left (EUiA) | 75,091 | 2.23 | New | 0 | ±0 |
| The Greens–Green Group (EV–GV) | 14,922 | 0.44 | New | 0 | ±0 |
| The Greens–Green Alternative (EV–AV) | 11,579 | 0.34 | New | 0 | ±0 |
| Internationalist Socialist Workers' Party (POSI) | 4,751 | 0.14 | New | 0 | ±0 |
| Liberal Independent Group (GIL) | 3,002 | 0.09 | New | 0 | ±0 |
| Catalan State (EC) | 2,321 | 0.07 | New | 0 | ±0 |
| Centrist Union–Democratic and Social Centre (UC–CDS) | 1,980 | 0.06 | −0.01 | 0 | ±0 |
| Humanist Party (PH) | 1,820 | 0.05 | +0.01 | 0 | ±0 |
| Republican Left–Left Republican Party (IR–PRE) | 1,541 | 0.05 | New | 0 | ±0 |
| Natural Law Party (PLN) | 1,474 | 0.04 | New | 0 | ±0 |
| The Phalanx (FE) | 1,371 | 0.04 | New | 0 | ±0 |
| Caló Nationalist Party (PNCA) | 1,142 | 0.03 | New | 0 | ±0 |
| Spain 2000 Platform (ES2000) | 855 | 0.03 | New | 0 | ±0 |
| Independent Spanish Phalanx–Phalanx 2000 (FEI–FE 2000) | 826 | 0.02 | New | 0 | ±0 |
| Internationalist Struggle (LI (LIT–CI)) | 816 | 0.02 | New | 0 | ±0 |
| European Nation State (N) | 710 | 0.02 | +0.01 | 0 | ±0 |
| Spanish Democratic Party (PADE) | 606 | 0.02 | New | 0 | ±0 |
| Democratic Party of the People (PDEP) | 85 | 0.00 | New | 0 | ±0 |
| Blank ballots | 47,526 | 1.41 | +0.75 | | |
| Total | 3,371,272 | | | 46 | ±0 |
| Valid votes | 3,371,272 | 99.50 | −0.17 | | |
| Invalid votes | 16,856 | 0.50 | +0.17 | | |
| Votes cast / turnout | 3,388,128 | 64.01 | −12.51 | | |
| Abstentions | 1,905,337 | 35.99 | +12.51 | | |
| Registered voters | 5,293,465 | | | | |

=== Extremadura ===
← Summary of the 12 March 2000 Congress of Deputies election results in Extremadura →
| Parties and alliances | Popular vote | | | Seats | |
| Parties and alliances | Votes | % | ±pp | Total | +/− |
|---|---|---|---|---|---|
| People's Party (PP) | 310,850 | 47.30 | +7.02 | 6 | +1 |
| Spanish Socialist Workers' Party–Progressives (PSOE–p) | 293,831 | 44.71 | −3.72 | 5 | −1 |
| United Left (IU) | 30,865 | 4.70 | −4.20 | 0 | ±0 |
| United Extremadura (EU) | 4,771 | 0.73 | New | 0 | ±0 |
| The Greens of Extremadura (LV) | 3,417 | 0.52 | New | 0 | ±0 |
| Extremaduran Coalition (PREx–CREx) | 2,371 | 0.36 | −0.68 | 0 | ±0 |
| Independent Socialists of Extremadura (SIEx) | 1,412 | 0.21 | −0.03 | 0 | ±0 |
| Centrist Union–Democratic and Social Centre (UC–CDS) | 525 | 0.08 | −0.06 | 0 | ±0 |
| The Phalanx (FE) | 461 | 0.07 | New | 0 | ±0 |
| Natural Law Party (PLN) | 326 | 0.05 | New | 0 | ±0 |
| Humanist Party (PH) | 198 | 0.03 | +0.01 | 0 | ±0 |
| Spain 2000 Platform (ES2000) | 191 | 0.03 | New | 0 | ±0 |
| Spanish Democratic Party (PADE) | 188 | 0.03 | New | 0 | ±0 |
| Independent Spanish Phalanx–Phalanx 2000 (FEI–FE 2000) | 137 | 0.02 | −0.01 | 0 | ±0 |
| Blank ballots | 7,605 | 1.16 | +0.44 | | |
| Total | 657,148 | | | 11 | ±0 |
| Valid votes | 657,148 | 99.21 | −0.36 | | |
| Invalid votes | 5,245 | 0.79 | +0.36 | | |
| Votes cast / turnout | 662,393 | 75.42 | −6.91 | | |
| Abstentions | 215,899 | 24.58 | +6.91 | | |
| Registered voters | 878,292 | | | | |

=== Galicia ===
← Summary of the 12 March 2000 Congress of Deputies election results in Galicia →
| Parties and alliances | Popular vote | | | Seats | |
| Parties and alliances | Votes | % | ±pp | Total | +/− |
|---|---|---|---|---|---|
| People's Party (PP) | 888,092 | 53.99 | +5.68 | 16 | +2 |
| Socialists' Party of Galicia–Progressives (PSdeG–PSOE–p) | 389,999 | 23.71 | −9.83 | 6 | −3 |
| Galician Nationalist Bloc (BNG) | 306,268 | 18.62 | +5.77 | 3 | +1 |
| United Left (EU–IU) | 21,127 | 1.28 | −2.35 | 0 | ±0 |
| Party of Self-employed and Professionals (AUTONOMO) | 3,182 | 0.19 | New | 0 | ±0 |
| Galician Democracy (DG) | 2,958 | 0.18 | New | 0 | ±0 |
| Galician Coalition (CG) | 2,361 | 0.14 | New | 0 | ±0 |
| Galician People's Front (FPG) | 2,252 | 0.14 | +0.02 | 0 | ±0 |
| Humanist Party (PH) | 1,911 | 0.12 | +0.04 | 0 | ±0 |
| Centrist Union–Democratic and Social Centre (UC–CDS) | 1,724 | 0.10 | −0.05 | 0 | ±0 |
| Spain 2000 Platform (ES2000) | 929 | 0.06 | New | 0 | ±0 |
| The Phalanx (FE) | 893 | 0.05 | New | 0 | ±0 |
| Natural Law Party (PLN) | 716 | 0.04 | New | 0 | ±0 |
| Spanish Democratic Party (PADE) | 594 | 0.04 | New | 0 | ±0 |
| Independent Spanish Phalanx–Phalanx 2000 (FEI–FE 2000) | 329 | 0.02 | New | 0 | ±0 |
| Blank ballots | 21,703 | 1.32 | +0.40 | | |
| Total | 1,645,045 | | | 25 | ±0 |
| Valid votes | 1,645,045 | 99.30 | −0.05 | | |
| Invalid votes | 11,617 | 0.70 | +0.05 | | |
| Votes cast / turnout | 1,656,662 | 65.02 | −6.38 | | |
| Abstentions | 891,119 | 34.98 | +6.38 | | |
| Registered voters | 2,547,781 | | | | |

=== La Rioja ===
← Summary of the 12 March 2000 Congress of Deputies election results in La Rioja →
| Parties and alliances | Popular vote | | | Seats | |
| Parties and alliances | Votes | % | ±pp | Total | +/− |
|---|---|---|---|---|---|
| People's Party (PP) | 91,810 | 54.10 | +4.69 | 3 | +1 |
| Spanish Socialist Workers' Party–Progressives (PSOE–p) | 59,171 | 34.87 | −1.78 | 1 | −1 |
| United Left (IU) | 6,830 | 4.02 | −4.69 | 0 | ±0 |
| Riojan Party (PR) | 6,155 | 3.63 | +0.23 | 0 | ±0 |
| The Greens (Verdes) | 1,709 | 1.01 | New | 0 | ±0 |
| Spanish Democratic Party (PADE) | 139 | 0.08 | New | 0 | ±0 |
| Centrist Union–Democratic and Social Centre (UC–CDS) | 131 | 0.08 | −0.18 | 0 | ±0 |
| Movement for Humanist Socialism (MASH) | 121 | 0.07 | New | 0 | ±0 |
| The Phalanx (FE) | 104 | 0.06 | New | 0 | ±0 |
| Humanist Party (PH) | 79 | 0.05 | New | 0 | ±0 |
| Natural Law Party (PLN) | 79 | 0.05 | New | 0 | ±0 |
| Carlist Party (PC) | 56 | 0.03 | New | 0 | ±0 |
| Spain 2000 Platform (ES2000) | 46 | 0.03 | New | 0 | ±0 |
| Blank ballots | 3,265 | 1.92 | +0.45 | | |
| Total | 169,695 | | | 4 | ±0 |
| Valid votes | 169,695 | 99.24 | −0.16 | | |
| Invalid votes | 1,302 | 0.76 | +0.16 | | |
| Votes cast / turnout | 170,997 | 74.21 | −6.71 | | |
| Abstentions | 59,430 | 25.79 | +6.71 | | |
| Registered voters | 230,427 | | | | |

=== Madrid ===
← Summary of the 12 March 2000 Congress of Deputies election results in Madrid →
| Parties and alliances | Popular vote | | | Seats | |
| Parties and alliances | Votes | % | ±pp | Total | +/− |
|---|---|---|---|---|---|
| People's Party (PP) | 1,625,831 | 52.52 | +3.23 | 19 | +2 |
| Spanish Socialist Workers' Party–Progressives (PSOE–p) | 1,023,212 | 33.06 | +1.64 | 12 | +1 |
| United Left of the Community of Madrid (IUCM) | 282,180 | 9.12 | −7.32 | 3 | −3 |
| Liberal Independent Group (GIL) | 32,432 | 1.05 | New | 0 | ±0 |
| The Greens (LV) | 24,372 | 0.79 | +0.63 | 0 | ±0 |
| The Greens of the Community of Madrid (LVCM) | 21,087 | 0.68 | +0.43 | 0 | ±0 |
| Centrist Union–Democratic and Social Centre (UC–CDS) | 3,557 | 0.11 | −0.26 | 0 | ±0 |
| Communist Party of the Peoples of Spain (PCPE) | 2,836 | 0.09 | +0.04 | 0 | ±0 |
| Party of Self-employed, Retirees and Independents (EL–PAPI) | 2,336 | 0.08 | New | 0 | ±0 |
| Humanist Party (PH) | 2,050 | 0.07 | +0.03 | 0 | ±0 |
| The Phalanx (FE) | 1,955 | 0.06 | New | 0 | ±0 |
| Internationalist Socialist Workers' Party (POSI) | 1,757 | 0.06 | New | 0 | ±0 |
| Party Association of Widows and Legal Wives (PAVIEL) | 1,690 | 0.05 | New | 0 | ±0 |
| Independent Spanish Phalanx–Phalanx 2000 (FEI–FE 2000) | 1,469 | 0.05 | +0.02 | 0 | ±0 |
| Madrilenian Independent Regional Party (PRIM) | 1,363 | 0.04 | −0.01 | 0 | ±0 |
| Spanish Democratic Party (PADE) | 1,306 | 0.04 | New | 0 | ±0 |
| Commoners' Land–Castilian Nationalist Party (TC–PNC) | 1,264 | 0.04 | New | 0 | ±0 |
| Natural Law Party (PLN) | 1,263 | 0.04 | New | 0 | ±0 |
| Party of Self-employed, Retirees and Widows (PAE) | 1,194 | 0.04 | New | 0 | ±0 |
| Republican Action (AR) | 1,089 | 0.04 | +0.02 | 0 | ±0 |
| Spain 2000 Platform (ES2000) | 773 | 0.02 | New | 0 | ±0 |
| Liberal and Social Democratic Coalition (CSD–L) | 650 | 0.02 | New | 0 | ±0 |
| Federal Progressives (PF) | 609 | 0.02 | New | 0 | ±0 |
| Iberian Union (UNIB) | 388 | 0.01 | New | 0 | ±0 |
| Carlist Party (PC) | 384 | 0.01 | New | 0 | ±0 |
| Internationalist Struggle (LI (LIT–CI)) | 306 | 0.01 | New | 0 | ±0 |
| Blank ballots | 58,114 | 1.88 | +0.62 | | |
| Total | 3,095,467 | | | 34 | ±0 |
| Valid votes | 3,095,467 | 99.48 | −0.20 | | |
| Invalid votes | 16,195 | 0.52 | +0.20 | | |
| Votes cast / turnout | 3,111,662 | 72.08 | −7.51 | | |
| Abstentions | 1,205,484 | 27.92 | +7.51 | | |
| Registered voters | 4,317,146 | | | | |

=== Murcia ===
← Summary of the 12 March 2000 Congress of Deputies election results in Murcia →
| Parties and alliances | Popular vote | | | Seats | |
| Parties and alliances | Votes | % | ±pp | Total | +/− |
|---|---|---|---|---|---|
| People's Party (PP) | 389,564 | 58.08 | +8.19 | 6 | +1 |
| Spanish Socialist Workers' Party–Progressives (PSOE–p) | 217,179 | 32.38 | −5.61 | 3 | ±0 |
| United Left (IU) | 41,842 | 6.24 | −4.29 | 0 | −1 |
| The Greens of the Region of Murcia (LVRM) | 6,555 | 0.98 | New | 0 | ±0 |
| Liberal Independent Group (GIL) | 2,362 | 0.35 | New | 0 | ±0 |
| Spanish Democratic Party (PADE) | 1,389 | 0.21 | New | 0 | ±0 |
| Self-employed Spanish Party (PEDA) | 1,130 | 0.17 | New | 0 | ±0 |
| Citizens' Convergence of the South-East (CCSE) | 645 | 0.10 | ±0.00 | 0 | ±0 |
| Centrist Union–Democratic and Social Centre (UC–CDS) | 635 | 0.09 | −0.18 | 0 | ±0 |
| The Phalanx (FE) | 604 | 0.09 | New | 0 | ±0 |
| New Region (NR) | 598 | 0.09 | −0.12 | 0 | ±0 |
| Natural Law Party (PLN) | 410 | 0.06 | New | 0 | ±0 |
| Spain 2000 Platform (ES2000) | 383 | 0.06 | New | 0 | ±0 |
| Catalan State (EC) | 203 | 0.03 | New | 0 | ±0 |
| Blank ballots | 7,185 | 1.07 | +0.28 | | |
| Total | 670,684 | | | 9 | ±0 |
| Valid votes | 670,684 | 99.43 | −0.11 | | |
| Invalid votes | 3,832 | 0.57 | +0.11 | | |
| Votes cast / turnout | 674,516 | 73.54 | −8.46 | | |
| Abstentions | 242,701 | 26.46 | +8.46 | | |
| Registered voters | 917,217 | | | | |

=== Navarre ===
← Summary of the 12 March 2000 Congress of Deputies election results in Navarre →
| Parties and alliances | Popular vote | | | Seats | |
| Parties and alliances | Votes | % | ±pp | Total | +/− |
|---|---|---|---|---|---|
| Navarrese People's Union–People's Party (UPN–PP) | 150,995 | 49.89 | +12.77 | 3 | +1 |
| Spanish Socialist Workers' Party–Progressives (PSOE–p) | 82,688 | 27.32 | −2.94 | 2 | ±0 |
| United Left of Navarre (IUN/NEB) | 23,038 | 7.61 | −4.84 | 0 | −1 |
| Basque Solidarity (EA) | 14,185 | 4.69 | +0.92 | 0 | ±0 |
| Convergence of Democrats of Navarre (CDN) | 8,646 | 2.86 | −2.39 | 0 | ±0 |
| Basque Nationalist Party (EAJ/PNV) | 6,536 | 2.16 | +1.19 | 0 | ±0 |
| Natural Law Party (PLN) | 1,366 | 0.45 | New | 0 | ±0 |
| Humanist Party (PH) | 970 | 0.32 | +0.03 | 0 | ±0 |
| Carlist Party (EKA) | 650 | 0.21 | New | 0 | ±0 |
| Democratic and Social Centre–Centrist Union (CDS–UC) | 529 | 0.17 | +0.06 | 0 | ±0 |
| The Phalanx (FE) | 455 | 0.15 | New | 0 | ±0 |
| Spain 2000 Platform (ES2000) | 267 | 0.09 | New | 0 | ±0 |
| Internationalist Struggle (LI (LIT–CI)) | 263 | 0.09 | New | 0 | ±0 |
| Independent Spanish Phalanx–Phalanx 2000 (FEI–FE 2000) | 153 | 0.05 | New | 0 | ±0 |
| Basque Citizens (EH)^{1} | 0 | 0.00 | −8.16 | 0 | ±0 |
| Blank ballots | 11,945 | 3.95 | +2.26 | | |
| Total | 302,686 | | | 5 | ±0 |
| Valid votes | 302,686 | 98.76 | −0.62 | | |
| Invalid votes | 3,808 | 1.24 | +0.62 | | |
| Votes cast / turnout | 306,494 | 66.07 | −7.38 | | |
| Abstentions | 157,398 | 33.93 | +7.38 | | |
| Registered voters | 463,892 | | | | |
Sources
Footnotes: ^{1} Basque Citizens results are compared to Popular Unity totals in the 1996 election. EH called for election boycott and urged its supporters to abstain.

=== Valencian Community ===
← Summary of the 12 March 2000 Congress of Deputies election results in the Valencian Community →
| Parties and alliances | Popular vote | | | Seats | |
| Parties and alliances | Votes | % | ±pp | Total | +/− |
|---|---|---|---|---|---|
| People's Party (PP) | 1,267,062 | 52.11 | +8.38 | 19 | +4 |
| Spanish Socialist Workers' Party–Progressives (PSOE–p) | 826,595 | 34.00 | −4.32 | 12 | −1 |
| United Left of the Valencian Country (EUPV) | 141,404 | 5.82 | −5.26 | 1 | −2 |
| Valencian Nationalist Bloc–The Greens–Valencians for Change (BNV–EV)^{1} | 58,551 | 2.41 | +0.58 | 0 | ±0 |
| Valencian Union (UV) | 57,830 | 2.38 | −1.16 | 0 | −1 |
| The Eco-pacifist Greens (LVEP) | 22,220 | 0.91 | New | 0 | ±0 |
| Liberal Independent Group (GIL) | 5,444 | 0.22 | New | 0 | ±0 |
| Communist Party of the Peoples of Spain (PCPE) | 3,149 | 0.13 | −0.02 | 0 | ±0 |
| Front for the Valencian Country–Republican Left of Catalonia (Front–ERC) | 3,083 | 0.13 | ±0.00 | 0 | ±0 |
| Internationalist Socialist Workers' Party (POSI) | 2,731 | 0.11 | New | 0 | ±0 |
| Centrist Union–Democratic and Social Centre (UC–CDS) | 1,960 | 0.08 | −0.05 | 0 | ±0 |
| Spain 2000 Platform (ES2000) | 1,516 | 0.06 | New | 0 | ±0 |
| The Phalanx (FE) | 1,435 | 0.06 | New | 0 | ±0 |
| Humanist Party (PH) | 1,385 | 0.06 | +0.02 | 0 | ±0 |
| Spanish Democratic Party (PADE) | 1,233 | 0.05 | New | 0 | ±0 |
| Natural Law Party (PLN) | 1,015 | 0.04 | New | 0 | ±0 |
| Republican Action (AR) | 954 | 0.04 | +0.03 | 0 | ±0 |
| Valencian Nationalist Left (ENV) | 920 | 0.04 | ±0.00 | 0 | ±0 |
| Independent Spanish Phalanx–Phalanx 2000 (FEI–FE 2000) | 784 | 0.03 | New | 0 | ±0 |
| Self-employed Spanish Party (PEDA) | 774 | 0.03 | New | 0 | ±0 |
| Catalan State (EC) | 501 | 0.02 | New | 0 | ±0 |
| Independent Initiative (II) | 425 | 0.02 | New | 0 | ±0 |
| Carlist Party (PC) | 395 | 0.02 | New | 0 | ±0 |
| New Force (FN) | 343 | 0.01 | New | 0 | ±0 |
| Social and Autonomist Liberal Group (ALAS) | 339 | 0.01 | −0.01 | 0 | ±0 |
| Caló Nationalist Party (PNCA) | 189 | 0.01 | New | 0 | ±0 |
| Blank ballots | 29,198 | 1.20 | +0.40 | | |
| Total | 2,431,435 | | | 32 | ±0 |
| Valid votes | 2,431,435 | 99.35 | −0.14 | | |
| Invalid votes | 15,946 | 0.65 | +0.14 | | |
| Votes cast / turnout | 2,447,381 | 72.70 | −8.96 | | |
| Abstentions | 918,829 | 27.30 | +8.96 | | |
| Registered voters | 3,366,210 | | | | |
Sources
Footnotes: ^{1} Valencian Nationalist Bloc–The Greens–Valencians for Change results are compared to the combined totals of Valencian People's Union–Nationalist Bloc and The Greens of the Valencian Country in the 1996 election.

== Autonomous cities ==
=== Ceuta ===
← Summary of the 12 March 2000 Congress of Deputies election results in Ceuta →
| Parties and alliances | Popular vote | | | Seats | |
| Parties and alliances | Votes | % | ±pp | Total | +/− |
|---|---|---|---|---|---|
| People's Party (PP) | 14,514 | 47.59 | −5.62 | 1 | ±0 |
| Liberal Independent Group (GIL) | 8,758 | 28.71 | New | 0 | ±0 |
| Spanish Socialist Workers' Party–Progressives (PSOE–p) | 5,491 | 18.00 | −17.79 | 0 | ±0 |
| Socialist Party of the People of Ceuta (PSPC) | 788 | 2.58 | −4.70 | 0 | ±0 |
| United Left (IU) | 229 | 0.75 | −1.46 | 0 | ±0 |
| The Phalanx (FE) | 93 | 0.30 | New | 0 | ±0 |
| Natural Law Party (PLN) | 76 | 0.25 | New | 0 | ±0 |
| Democratic and Social Centre–Centrist Union (CDS–UC) | 31 | 0.10 | New | 0 | ±0 |
| Spanish Democratic Party (PADE) | 24 | 0.08 | New | 0 | ±0 |
| Blank ballots | 497 | 1.63 | +0.41 | | |
| Total | 30,501 | | | 1 | ±0 |
| Valid votes | 30,501 | 99.03 | +0.23 | | |
| Invalid votes | 300 | 0.97 | −0.23 | | |
| Votes cast / turnout | 30,801 | 55.15 | −8.66 | | |
| Abstentions | 25,047 | 44.85 | +8.66 | | |
| Registered voters | 55,848 | | | | |

=== Melilla ===
← Summary of the 12 March 2000 Congress of Deputies election results in Melilla →
| Parties and alliances | Popular vote | | | Seats | |
| Parties and alliances | Votes | % | ±pp | Total | +/− |
|---|---|---|---|---|---|
| People's Party–Melillan People's Union (PP–UPM) | 13,078 | 49.80 | −0.77 | 1 | ±0 |
| Localist Bloc of Melilla (BLM) | 6,514 | 24.81 | New | 0 | ±0 |
| Spanish Socialist Workers' Party–Progressives (PSOE–p) | 5,363 | 20.42 | −22.90 | 0 | ±0 |
| United Left (IU) | 397 | 1.51 | −1.97 | 0 | ±0 |
| The Greens–Green Group (LV–GV) | 174 | 0.66 | New | 0 | ±0 |
| Nationalist Aprome (Aprome) | 60 | 0.23 | −0.50 | 0 | ±0 |
| The Phalanx (FE) | 48 | 0.18 | New | 0 | ±0 |
| Independent Spanish Phalanx–Phalanx 2000 (FEI–FE 2000) | 38 | 0.14 | +0.02 | 0 | ±0 |
| Natural Law Party (PLN) | 23 | 0.09 | New | 0 | ±0 |
| Spanish Democratic Party (PADE) | 13 | 0.05 | New | 0 | ±0 |
| Blank ballots | 551 | 2.10 | +0.48 | | |
| Total | 26,259 | | | 1 | ±0 |
| Valid votes | 26,259 | 99.28 | +0.19 | | |
| Invalid votes | 191 | 0.72 | −0.19 | | |
| Votes cast / turnout | 26,450 | 54.00 | −7.95 | | |
| Abstentions | 22,535 | 46.00 | +7.95 | | |
| Registered voters | 48,985 | | | | |
