= National Democratic Party of Spain =

National Democratic Party of Spain Partido Demócrata Nacional de España
- President: Salvador González Pedrero
- Founded: 1 September 2003
- Headquarters: Plaza San Nicolás, 2 bajo Q, Murcia
- Ideology: Neofascism; Spanish nationalism
- Political position: Far-right

National Democratic Party of Spain (in Spanish: Partido Demócrata Nacional de España) is a small far-right nationalist political party in Spain. In the 2004 parliamentary elections PDNE was the second least voted party, with just 232 votes.
