= Party of the Democratic Karma =

Party of the Democratic Karma Partido del Karma Democrático
- Leader: Bosco "el Tosco"
- Founded: 2000
- Headquarters: Bilbao
- Newspaper: Karma dice
- Ideology: Joke party

Website
- www.pkd.com

Party of the Democratic Karma (Spanish: Partido del Karma Democrático) is a Spanish joke party founded by the publishers of the satire magazine Karma dice (English: Karma Says). The party was officially registered in 2002.

== Activities and history ==
The party's motto is "PKD: the useless vote. The vote just like you." (Spanish: "PKD: el voto inútil. El voto como tú.") They support absurd proposals like paying civil servants with corticoles (vouchers from the general store El Corte Inglés redeemable for school supplies), building in flower pots, and promising to corrupt themselves as much as possible. Their magazine and party are based in the Basque Country, and they reflect a reaction to their fellow Basque citizens' perceived overly serious approach to life.

In the Basque elections in 2001, the party received the seventh most votes.
