= European Nation State =

European Nation State Estado Nacional Europeo
- Secretary: Luis Antonio García Rodríguez
- Founded: 10 January of 1999
- Ideology: Neo-Nazism; Revolutionary nationalism Pan-European nationalism
- Political position: Far-right
- Colours: Black and White

Website
- n-europa.org

European Nation State (in Spanish: Estado Nacional Europeo), also referred to as N, is a small far-right political party in Catalonia, Spain. The party defines itself as "National European" and "Popular Socialist". It publishes Intemperie.

== History ==
The party participated in the 2003 Barcelona municipal elections and the 2004 parliamentary elections. In the latter, the party received 410 votes.

In October 2005 police arrested six N members, including the party general secretary Luis Antonio García Rodríguez. The Fiscalia del Tribunal Superior de Justícia de Catalunya has petitioned that N ought to be banned on the grounds of being a Nazi party.
