= Castellón (Corts Valencianes constituency) =

Coordinates: 40°10′N 0°10′W

- Corts Valencianes; Electoral constituency
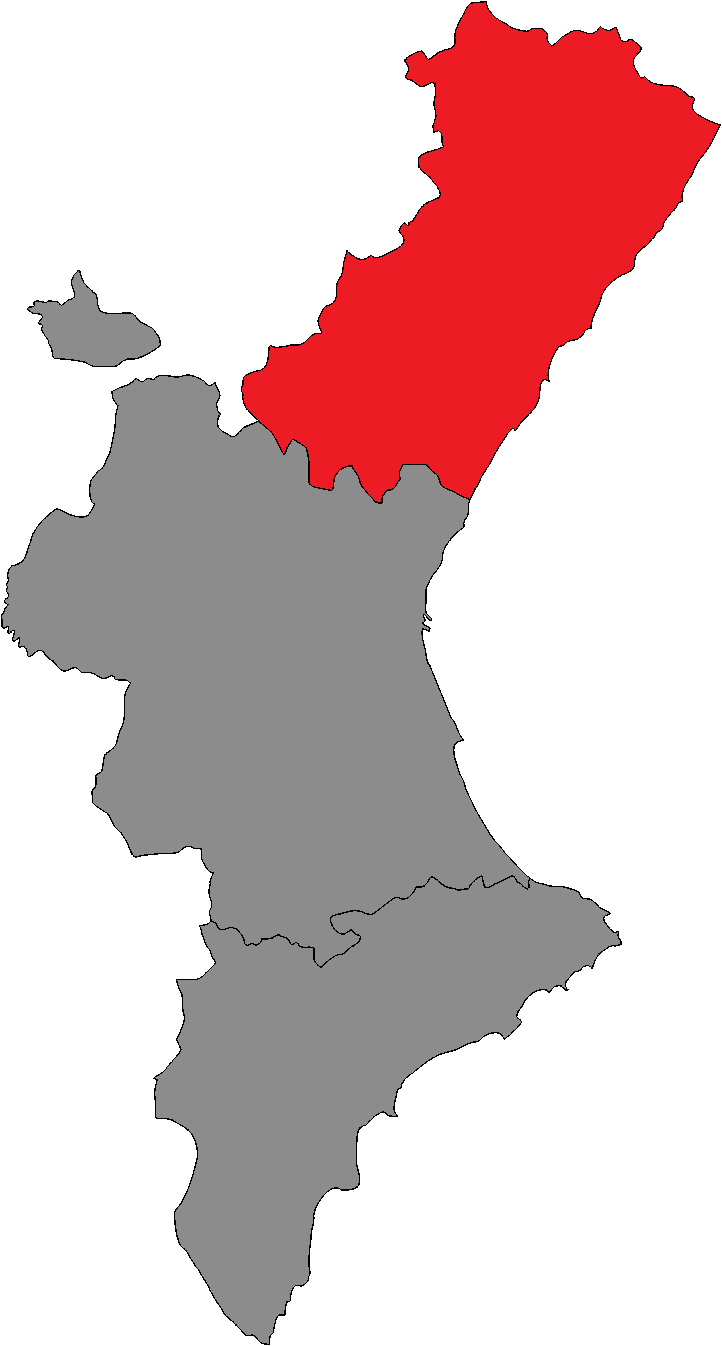
- Location of Castellón within the Valencian Community
- Province: Castellón
- Autonomous community: Valencian Community
- Population: ▲615,849 (2024)
- Electorate: ▲430,308 (2023)
- Major settlements: Castellón de la Plana, Villarreal

Current constituency
- Created: 1983
- Seats: 25 (1983–1987); 23 (1987–1991); 22 (1991–2003); 23 (2003–2007); 24 (2007–present)
- Members: PP (10); PSPV (8); Compromís (3); Vox (3)

Castellón (Valencian: Castelló) is one of the three constituencies (Spanish: circunscripciones) represented in the Corts Valencianes, the regional legislature of the Valencian Community. The constituency currently elects 24 deputies. Its boundaries correspond to those of the Spanish province of Castellón. The electoral system uses the D'Hondt method and closed-list proportional representation, with a minimum threshold of five percent regionally.

== Electoral system ==
The constituency was created as per the Statute of Autonomy of the Valencian Community of 1982 and was first contested in the 1983 regional election. The Statute provided for the three provinces in the Valencian Community—Alicante, Castellón and Valencia—to be established as multi-member districts in the Corts Valencianes, with this regulation being maintained under the 1987 regional electoral law. Each constituency is entitled to an initial minimum of 20 seats, with the remaining 39—29 until 2007—being distributed in proportion to their populations (provided that the seat-to-population ratio in any given province did not exceed three times that of any other). The exception was the 1983 election, when each constituency was allocated a fixed number of seats: 29 for Alicante, 25 for Castellón and 35 for Valencia.

Voting is on the basis of universal suffrage, which comprises all nationals over eighteen, registered in the Valencian Community and in full enjoyment of their political rights. Amendments to the electoral law in 2011 required for Valencians abroad to apply for voting before being permitted to vote, a system known as "begged" or expat vote (Spanish: Voto rogado) which was abolished in 2022. Seats are elected using the D'Hondt method and a closed list proportional representation, with a threshold of five percent of valid votes—which includes blank ballots—being applied regionally. Parties not reaching the threshold are not taken into consideration for seat distribution.

The electoral law allows for parties and federations registered in the interior ministry, coalitions and groupings of electors to present lists of candidates. Parties and federations intending to form a coalition ahead of an election are required to inform the relevant Electoral Commission within ten days of the election call—fifteen before 1985—whereas groupings of electors need to secure the signature of at least one percent of the electorate in the constituencies for which they seek election—one-thousandth of the electorate, with a compulsory minimum of 500 signatures, until 1985—disallowing electors from signing for more than one list of candidates.

== Deputies ==
Deputies 1983–present
Key to parties PCE–PCPV EUPV IU–UPV CPV Unides Podem Podemos/Podem Compromís PSPV–PSOE CDS Cs UV PP CP AP Vox
Corts	Election	Distribution
1st	1983	1 / 14 / 10
2nd	1987	1 / 11 / 3 / 8
3rd	1991	1 / 11 / 1 / 9
4th	1995	2 / 8 / 1 / 11
5th	1999	1 / 9 / 12
6th	2003	1 / 9 / 13
7th	2007	2 / 10 / 12
8th	2011	1 / 1 / 9 / 13
9th	2015	3 / 4 / 6 / 3 / 8
10th	2019	2 / 4 / 7 / 4 / 5 / 2
11th	2023	3 / 8 / 10 / 3

== Regional elections ==
=== 2023 ===
Summary of the 28 May 2023 Corts Valencianes election results in Castellón
Parties and alliances	Popular vote			Seats	
Parties and alliances	Votes	%	±pp	Total	+/−
People's Party (PP)	104,023	35.99	+14.47	10	+5
Socialist Party of the Valencian Country (PSPV–PSOE)	87,364	30.22	+2.63	8	+1
Commitment: Més–Initiative–Greens Equo (Compromís)	37,825	13.09	–1.34	3	–1
Vox (Vox)	37,775	13.07	+2.60	3	+1
United We Can–United Left (Unides Podem–EUPV)	9,328	3.23	–4.55	0	–2
Citizens–Party of the Citizenry (CS)	4,005	1.39	–13.74	0	–4
Centered in Our Land (Centrats)	1,326	0.46	New	0	±0
Republican Left of the Valencian Country (ERPV)	896	0.31	–0.04	0	±0
Communist Party of the Peoples of Spain (PCPE)	638	0.22	+0.03	0	±0
United Coalition (Units)	442	0.15	New	0	±0
Zero Cuts (Recortes Cero)	409	0.14	New	0	±0
Alliance for the Commerce and Housing (AlianzaCV)	280	0.10	New	0	±0
Valencian Republic–European Valencianist Party (RV–PVE)	272	0.09	New	0	±0
Decide (Decidix)	233	0.08	New	0	±0
Blank ballots	4,251	1.47	+0.58		
Total	289,067			24	±0
Valid votes	289,067	98.53	+0.14		
Invalid votes	4,301	1.47	–0.14		
Votes cast / turnout	293,368	68.18	–6.92		
Abstentions	136,940	31.82	+6.92		
Registered voters	430,308				

=== 2019 ===
Summary of the 28 April 2019 Corts Valencianes election results in Castellón
Parties and alliances	Popular vote			Seats	
Parties and alliances	Votes	%	±pp	Total	+/−
Socialist Party of the Valencian Country (PSPV–PSOE)	85,584	27.59	+3.61	7	+1
People's Party (PP)	66,733	21.52	–8.02	5	–3
Citizens–Party of the Citizenry (Cs)	46,941	15.13	+4.06	4	+1
Commitment: Bloc–Initiative–Greens Equo (Compromís)	44,748	14.43	+0.12	4	±0
Vox (Vox)	32,461	10.47	+10.12	2	+2
United We Can–United Left (Unides Podem–EUPV)^{1}	24,140	7.78	–6.93	2	–1
Animalist Party Against Mistreatment of Animals (PACMA)	3,604	1.16	+0.59	0	±0
Republican Left of the Valencian Country (ERPV)	1,097	0.35	New	0	±0
Forward–The Eco-pacifist Greens (Avant/Adelante–LVEP)	784	0.25	New	0	±0
Communist Party of the Peoples of Spain (PCPE)	576	0.19	+0.08	0	±0
Democratic People (Poble)	428	0.14	New	0	±0
Spanish Phalanx of the CNSO (FE–JONS)	300	0.10	–0.05	0	±0
Blank ballots	2,764	0.89	–0.58		
Total	310,167			24	±0
Valid votes	310,167	98.39	–0.03		
Invalid votes	5,077	1.61	+0.03		
Votes cast / turnout	315,244	75.10	+4.02		
Abstentions	104,527	24.90	–4.02		
Registered voters	419,771				
Sources
Footnotes: ^{1} United We Can–United Left results are compared to the combined totals of We Can and Citizen Agreement in the 2015 election.

=== 2015 ===
Summary of the 24 May 2015 Corts Valencianes election results in Castellón
Parties and alliances	Popular vote			Seats	
Parties and alliances	Votes	%	±pp	Total	+/−
People's Party (PP)	86,136	29.54	–18.52	8	–5
Socialist Party of the Valencian Country (PSPV–PSOE)	69,913	23.98	–7.03	6	–3
Commitment Coalition: Bloc–Initiative–Greens (Compromís)	41,710	14.31	+7.57	4	+3
We Can (Podemos/Podem)	33,680	11.55	New	3	+3
Citizens–Party of the Citizenry (C's)	32,274	11.07	New	3	+3
Citizen Agreement (EUPV–EV–ERPV–AS)^{1}	9,207	3.16	–3.90	0	–1
Citizens of Democratic Centre (CCD)	2,510	0.86	New	0	±0
Union, Progress and Democracy (UPyD)	2,277	0.78	–1.13	0	±0
Let's Win Valencian Country (Ganemos)	2,147	0.74	New	0	±0
Animalist Party Against Mistreatment of Animals (PACMA)	1,662	0.57	+0.24	0	±0
Spain 2000 (E–2000)	1,557	0.53	–0.49	0	±0
The Greens–The Ecologist Alternative (EV–AE)	1,149	0.39	New	0	±0
Vox (Vox)	1,015	0.35	New	0	±0
We Are Valencian (SOMVAL)	443	0.15	New	0	±0
Spanish Phalanx of the CNSO (FE–JONS)	426	0.15	New	0	±0
Communist Party of the Peoples of Spain (PCPE)	330	0.11	–0.07	0	±0
The National Coalition (LCN)	286	0.10	New	0	±0
Together (Junts)	272	0.09	New	0	±0
Zero Cuts (Recortes Cero)	219	0.08	New	0	±0
Democratic Forum (FDEE)	88	0.03	New	0	±0
Blank ballots	4,274	1.47	–1.34		
Total	291,575			24	±0
Valid votes	291,575	98.42	+0.48		
Invalid votes	4,670	1.58	–0.48		
Votes cast / turnout	296,245	71.08	+1.15		
Abstentions	120,559	28.92	–1.15		
Registered voters	416,804				
Sources
Footnotes: ^{1} Citizen Agreement results are compared to the combined totals of United Left of the Valencian Country, Greens and Eco-pacifists and Republican Left of the Valencian Country in the 2011 election.

=== 2011 ===
Summary of the 22 May 2011 Corts Valencianes election results in Castellón
Parties and alliances	Popular vote			Seats	
Parties and alliances	Votes	%	±pp	Total	+/−
People's Party (PP)	136,353	48.06	–1.25	13	+1
Socialist Party of the Valencian Country (PSPV–PSOE)	87,983	31.01	–6.99	9	–1
Bloc–Initiative–Greens: Commitment Coalition (Compromís)^{1}	19,115	6.74	n/a	1	±0
United Left of the Valencian Country (EUPV)^{1}	14,679	5.17	n/a	1	±0
Union, Progress and Democracy (UPyD)	5,423	1.91	New	0	±0
Greens and Eco-pacifists (VyE)	2,988	1.05	New	0	±0
Spain 2000 (E–2000)	2,908	1.02	+0.43	0	±0
Republican Left of the Valencian Country (ERPV)	2,372	0.84	+0.14	0	±0
Anti-Bullfighting Party Against Mistreatment of Animals (PACMA)	931	0.33	New	0	±0
Valencian Coalition (CVa)	827	0.29	–0.28	0	±0
National Democracy (DN)	555	0.20	New	0	±0
Communist Party of the Peoples of Spain (PCPE)	509	0.18	+0.04	0	±0
Liberal Democratic Centre (CDL)	505	0.18	New	0	±0
Family and Life Party (PFyV)	430	0.15	New	0	±0
United for Valencia (UxV)	189	0.07	–0.04	0	±0
Blank ballots	7,972	2.81	+1.19		
Total	283,739			24	±0
Valid votes	283,739	97.94	–1.24		
Invalid votes	5,963	2.06	+1.24		
Votes cast / turnout	289,702	69.93	–0.61		
Abstentions	124,590	30.07	+0.61		
Registered voters	414,292				
Sources
Footnotes: ^{1} Within the Commitment for the Valencian Country alliance in the 2007 election.

=== 2007 ===
Summary of the 27 May 2007 Corts Valencianes election results in Castellón
Parties and alliances	Popular vote			Seats	
Parties and alliances	Votes	%	±pp	Total	+/−
People's Party (PP)	140,982	49.31	+1.16	12	–1
Socialist Party of the Valencian Country (PSPV–PSOE)	108,653	38.00	+1.51	10	+1
Commitment for the Valencian Country (Compromís PV)^{1}	22,205	7.77	–2.47	2	+1
Republican Left of the Valencian Country (ERPV)	1,944	0.68	+0.21	0	±0
Spain 2000 (E–2000)	1,693	0.59	+0.46	0	±0
Valencian Coalition (CVa)	1,638	0.57	New	0	±0
Valencian Union–The Eco-pacifist Greens (UV–LVEP)	1,570	0.55	–1.47	0	±0
Social Democratic Party (PSD)	1,314	0.46	New	0	±0
Communist Party of the Peoples of Spain (PCPE)	386	0.14	–0.01	0	±0
Spanish Falange of the JONS (FE-JONS)	320	0.11	New	0	±0
United for Valencia (UxV)	315	0.11	New	0	±0
Authentic Phalanx (FA)	254	0.09	–0.01	0	±0
Blank ballots	4,619	1.62	–0.08		
Total	285,893			24	+1
Valid votes	285,893	99.18	+0.02		
Invalid votes	2,376	0.82	–0.02		
Votes cast / turnout	288,269	70.54	–2.22		
Abstentions	120,401	29.46	+2.22		
Registered voters	408,670				
Sources
Footnotes: ^{1} Commitment for the Valencian Country results are compared to the combined totals of United Left–The Greens–Valencian Left: Agreement and Valencian Nationalist Bloc–Green Left in the 2003 election.

=== 2003 ===
Summary of the 25 May 2003 Corts Valencianes election results in Castellón
Parties and alliances	Popular vote			Seats	
Parties and alliances	Votes	%	±pp	Total	+/−
People's Party (PP)	139,118	48.15	–1.15	13	+1
Socialist Party of the Valencian Country (PSPV–PSOE)	105,447	36.49	+1.92	9	±0
Valencian Nationalist Bloc–Green Left (Bloc–EV)	16,864	5.84	+0.54	0	±0
United Left–The Greens–Valencian Left: The Agreement (L'Entesa)	12,707	4.40	+0.23	1	±0
Union–Valencian Union (UV)	5,843	2.02	–2.33	0	±0
Republican Left of the Valencian Country (ERPV)	1,348	0.47	New	0	±0
Federal Republican Party (PRF)	586	0.20	+0.10	0	±0
Communist Party of the Peoples of Spain (PCPE)	442	0.15	New	0	±0
Spain 2000 (E–2000)	384	0.13	New	0	±0
Regional Party of the Valencian Community (PRCV)	360	0.12	New	0	±0
Humanist Party (PH)	336	0.12	±0.00	0	±0
Democratic and Social Centre (CDS)	301	0.10	New	0	±0
Authentic Phalanx (FA)	288	0.10	New	0	±0
Blank ballots	4,920	1.70	–0.16		
Total	288,944			23	+1
Valid votes	288,944	99.16	+0.02		
Invalid votes	2,450	0.84	–0.02		
Votes cast / turnout	291,394	72.76	+2.33		
Abstentions	109,077	27.24	–2.33		
Registered voters	400,471				

=== 1999 ===
Summary of the 13 June 1999 Corts Valencianes election results in Castellón
Parties and alliances	Popular vote			Seats	
Parties and alliances	Votes	%	±pp	Total	+/−
People's Party (PP)	132,300	49.30	+3.69	12	+1
Spanish Socialist Workers' Party–Progressives (PSOE–p)	92,771	34.57	–1.02	9	+1
Valencian Nationalist Bloc–The Greens (BNV–EV)^{1}	14,220	5.30	+1.10	0	±0
Valencian Union (UV)	11,681	4.35	–0.01	0	–1
United Left of the Valencian Country (EUPV)	11,186	4.17	–4.03	1	–1
Spanish Phalanx of the CNSO (FE–JONS)	331	0.12	New	0	±0
Humanist Party (PH)	315	0.12	New	0	±0
Valencian Nationalist Left (ENV)	294	0.11	+0.01	0	±0
Federal Republican Left–Federal Republican Party (IRF–PRF)	267	0.10	New	0	±0
Blank ballots	5,002	1.86	+0.83		
Total	268,367			22	±0
Valid votes	268,367	99.14	–0.26		
Invalid votes	2,315	0.86	+0.26		
Votes cast / turnout	270,682	70.43	–5.86		
Abstentions	113,653	29.57	+5.86		
Registered voters	384,335				
Sources
Footnotes: ^{1} Valencian Nationalist Bloc–The Greens results are compared to Valencian People's Union–Nationalist Bloc totals in the 1995 election.

=== 1995 ===
Summary of the 28 May 1995 Corts Valencianes election results in Castellón
Parties and alliances	Popular vote			Seats	
Parties and alliances	Votes	%	±pp	Total	+/−
People's Party (PP)	127,777	45.61	+10.33	11	+2
Spanish Socialist Workers' Party (PSOE)	99,700	35.59	–5.78	8	–3
United Left–The Greens (EU–EV)^{1}	22,982	8.20	+1.80	2	+1
Valencian Union–Independents–Centrists (UV–FICVA–CCV)	12,218	4.36	–0.84	1	±0
Valencian People's Union–Nationalist Bloc (UPV–BN)	11,754	4.20	–0.72	0	±0
Democratic and Social Centre (CDS)	1,075	0.38	–4.32	0	±0
Platform of Independents of Spain (PIE)	574	0.20	New	0	±0
Communist Party of the Peoples of Spain (PCPE)	413	0.15	+0.02	0	±0
Autonomist Republican Party (PRA)	375	0.13	New	0	±0
Valencian Nationalist Left (ENV)^{2}	277	0.10	New	0	±0
United Alicante (AU)	118	0.04	New	0	±0
Blank ballots	2,887	1.03	–0.04		
Total	280,150			22	±0
Valid votes	280,150	99.40	+0.11		
Invalid votes	1,689	0.60	–0.11		
Votes cast / turnout	281,839	76.29	+3.99		
Abstentions	87,595	23.71	–3.99		
Registered voters	369,434				
Sources
Footnotes: ^{1} United Left–The Greens results are compared to the combined totals of United Left of the Valencian Country and The Greens in the 1991 election.; ^{2} Valencian Nationalist Left results are compared to Valencian Nationalist Union totals in the 1991 election.

=== 1991 ===
Summary of the 26 May 1991 Corts Valencianes election results in Castellón
Parties and alliances	Popular vote			Seats	
Parties and alliances	Votes	%	±pp	Total	+/−
Spanish Socialist Workers' Party (PSOE)	103,069	41.37	+0.44	11	±0
People's Party (PP)^{1}	87,908	35.28	+2.83	9	+1
Valencian Union (UV)	12,953	5.20	+2.09	1	+1
Valencian People's Union (UPV)^{2}	12,267	4.92	n/a	0	±0
United Left of the Valencian Country (EUPV)^{2}	11,964	4.80	n/a	1	±0
Democratic and Social Centre (CDS)	11,715	4.70	–6.81	0	–3
The Greens (LV)	3,994	1.60	+0.66	0	±0
Socialist Democracy (DS)	1,727	0.69	New	0	±0
Alliance for the Republic (AxR)^{3}	378	0.15	–0.02	0	±0
Left Platform (PCE (m–l)–CRPE)	330	0.13	New	0	±0
Cantonalist Party of the Alicantine Country (Alicantón)	166	0.07	New	0	±0
Blank ballots	2,674	1.07	–0.19		
Total	249,145			22	–1
Valid votes	249,145	99.29	+0.49		
Invalid votes	1,770	0.71	–0.49		
Votes cast / turnout	250,915	72.30	–4.17		
Abstentions	96,124	27.70	+4.17		
Registered voters	347,039				
Sources
Footnotes: ^{1} People's Party results are compared to the combined totals of People's Alliance and People's Democratic Party–Valencian Centrists in the 1987 election.; ^{2} Within the United Left–Valencian People's Union alliance in the 1987 election.; ^{3} Alliance for the Republic results are compared to Internationalist Socialist Workers' Party totals in the 1987 election.

=== 1987 ===
Summary of the 10 June 1987 Corts Valencianes election results in Castellón
Parties and alliances	Popular vote			Seats	
Parties and alliances	Votes	%	±pp	Total	+/−
Spanish Socialist Workers' Party (PSOE)	102,082	40.93	–8.16	11	–3
People's Alliance (AP)^{1}	76,575	30.70	n/a	8	+2
Democratic and Social Centre (CDS)	28,711	11.51	+9.50	3	+3
United Left–Valencian People's Union (IU–UPV)^{2}	13,800	5.53	–4.56	1	±0
Valencian Union (UV)^{1}	7,748	3.11	n/a	0	–1
Workers' Party of Spain–Communist Unity (PTE–UC)	6,256	2.51	New	0	±0
People's Democratic Party–Valencian Centrists (PDP–CV)^{1}	4,365	1.75	n/a	0	–3
The Greens (LV)	2,354	0.94	New	0	±0
Valencian Electoral Coalition (CEV)	2,295	0.92	New	0	±0
Valencian Nationalist Left (ENV–URV)	464	0.19	New	0	±0
Internationalist Socialist Workers' Party (POSI)	436	0.17	New	0	±0
Communist Unification of Spain (UCE)	428	0.17	New	0	±0
Humanist Platform (PH)	400	0.16	New	0	±0
Republican Popular Unity (UPR)	334	0.13	New	0	±0
Blank ballots	3,154	1.26	+0.60		
Total	249,402			23	–2
Valid votes	249,402	98.80	+0.02		
Invalid votes	3,025	1.20	–0.02		
Votes cast / turnout	252,427	76.47	+1.67		
Abstentions	77,669	23.53	–1.67		
Registered voters	330,096				
Sources
Footnotes: ^{1} Within the People's Coalition–Valencian Union alliance in the 1983 election.; ^{2} United Left–Valencian People's Union results are compared to the combined totals of Communist Party of the Valencian Country and Valencian People's Union in the 1983 election.

=== 1983 ===
Summary of the 8 May 1983 Corts Valencianes election results in Castellón
Parties and alliances	Popular vote			Seats	
Parties and alliances	Votes	%	±pp	Total	+/−
Spanish Socialist Workers' Party (PSOE)	117,019	49.09	n/a	14	n/a
People's Coalition–Valencian Union (AP–PDP–UL–UV)	81,303	34.11	n/a	10	n/a
Communist Party of the Valencian Country (PCE–PCPV)	13,364	5.61	n/a	1	n/a
Valencian People's Union (UPV)	10,687	4.48	n/a	0	n/a
Liberal Democratic Party (PDL)	9,617	4.03	n/a	0	n/a
Democratic and Social Centre (CDS)	4,799	2.01	n/a	0	n/a
Blank ballots	1,576	0.66	n/a		
Total	238,365			25	n/a
Valid votes	238,365	98.78	n/a		
Invalid votes	2,950	1.22	n/a		
Votes cast / turnout	241,315	74.80	n/a		
Abstentions	81,299	25.20	n/a		
Registered voters	322,614				
