= 2007 Valencian regional election =

Election in the Spanish region of the Valencian Community

- 27 May 2007

All 99 seats in the Corts Valencianes 50 seats needed for a majority
- Opinion polls
- Registered: 3,491,365 ▲2.0%
- Turnout: 2,448,830 (70.1%) ▼1.4 pp
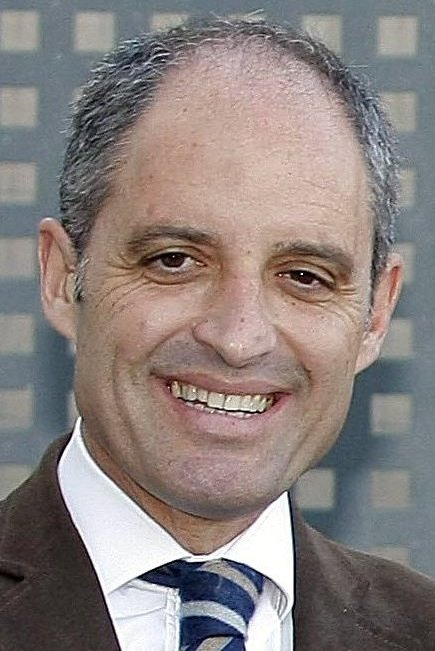

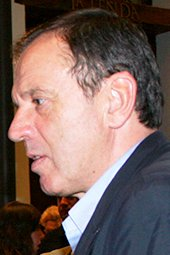

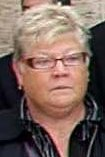
	First party	Second party	Third party
Leader	Francisco Camps	Joan Ignasi Pla	Glòria Marcos
Party	PP	PSPV–PSOE	Compromís PV
Leader since	10 July 2002	24 September 2000	26 January 2007
Leader's seat	Valencia	Valencia	Valencia
Last election	48 seats, 47.2%	35 seats, 36.0%	6 seats, 11.0% (Note: Results for Entesa (6.4%, 6 seats) and Bloc–EV (4.7%, 0 seats) in the 2003 election.)
Seats won	54	38	7
Seat change	▲6	▲3	▲1
Popular vote	1,277,458	838,987	195,116
Percentage	52.5%	34.5%	8.0%
Swing	▲5.3 pp	▼1.5 pp	▼3.0 pp
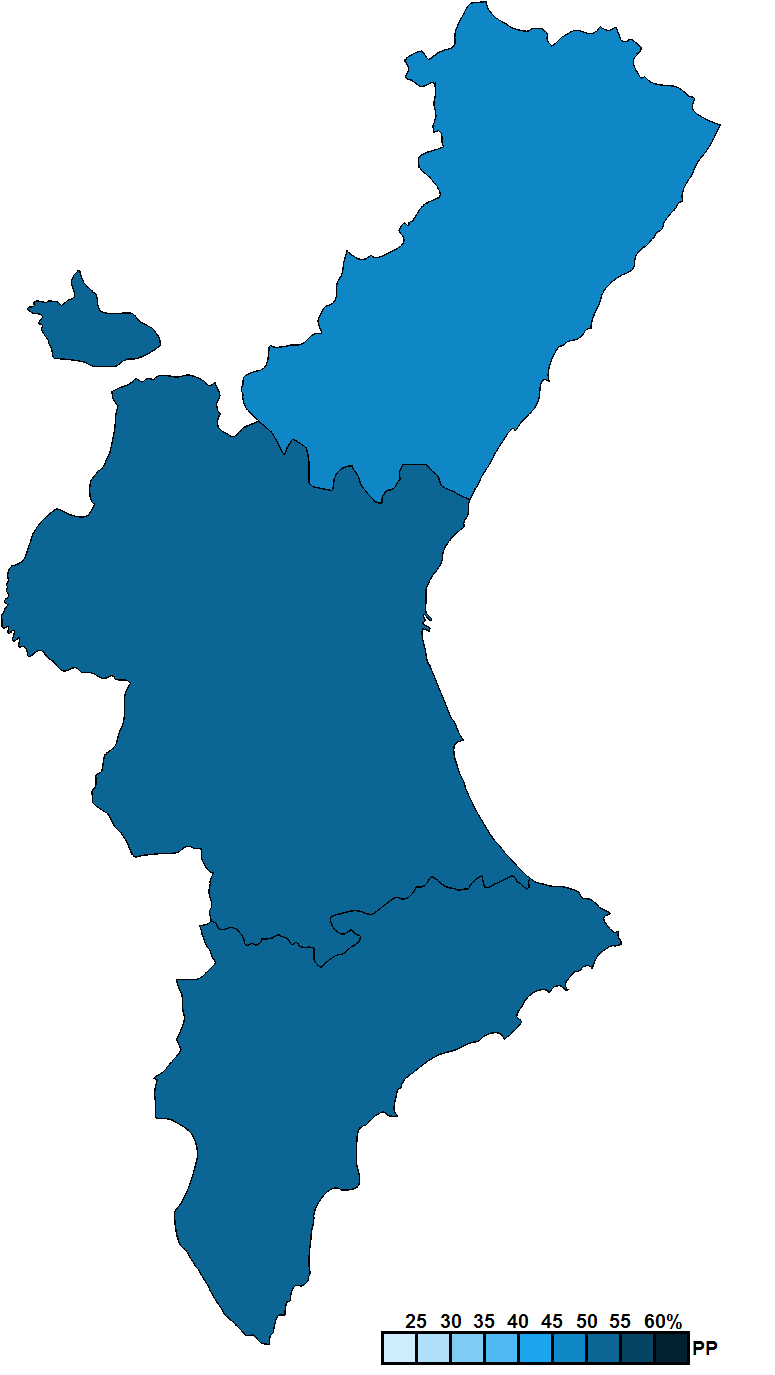
President before election
Francisco Camps
PP
President after election
Francisco Camps
PP

A regional election was held in the Valencian Community on 27 May 2007 to elect the 7th Corts of the autonomous community. All 99 seats in the Corts were up for election. It was held concurrently with regional elections in twelve other autonomous communities and local elections all across Spain.

As in the three previous elections, the People's Party (PP) with an increased absolute majority of seats, as well as winning an absolute majority of votes, the first and only time to date the party has reached this threshold, and only the second time since 1983 that any party has achieved this feat. The PP increased its vote share by more than 5% and gained six of the additional ten seats in the parliament, enlarged as a result of 2006 amendments to the regional Statute of Autonomy, all but ensuring incumbent president Francisco Camps's re-election for a second term in office. The Socialist Party of the Valencian Country (PSPV–PSOE) gained three seats despite seeing its vote share decrease by one point. This came as a result of the enlarged parliament, but the new election defeat and the below-expectations result for the party led to PSPV leader Joan Ignasi Pla to announce that he would step down as party secretary-general in the next congress.

The Valencian Nationalist Bloc (Bloc), whose performance in the previous election brought it within 0.3% of reaching the five percent threshold, had formed an electoral alliance with United Left of the Valencian Country (EUPV) under the name Commitment for the Valencian Country (CPV). This combined list, which also included smaller Green and left-wing groups, saw the Bloc gain its first seat representation in the Corts, though the combined vote for both EUPV and Bloc was considerably lesser than what both had polled separately in 2003.

== Overview ==
Under the 1982 Statute of Autonomy, the Corts Valencianes were the unicameral legislature of the Valencian Community, having legislative power in devolved matters, as well as the ability to grant or withdraw confidence from a regional president. The electoral and procedural rules were supplemented by national law provisions.

=== Date ===
The term of the Corts Valencianes expired four years after the date of their previous election, with election day being fixed for the fourth Sunday of May every four years. The election decree was required to be issued no later than 54 days before the scheduled election date and published on the following day in the Official Journal of the Valencian Government (DOGV). The previous election was held on 25 May 2003, setting the date for election day on the fourth Sunday of May four years later, which was 27 May 2007.

The Corts Valencianes could not be dissolved before the expiration date of parliament, except in the event of an investiture process failing to elect a regional president within a two-month period from the first ballot, after which they were to be automatically dissolved and a fresh election called. Amendments in 2006 would allow the term of the Corts to expire after an early dissolution, but these were to take effect after the 2007 election.

The Corts Valencianes were officially dissolved on 3 April 2007 with the publication of the corresponding decree in the DOGV, setting election day for 27 May and scheduling for the chamber to reconvene on 14 June.

=== Electoral system ===
Voting for the Corts was based on universal suffrage, comprising all Spanish nationals over 18 years of age, registered in the Valencian Community and with full political rights, provided that they had not been deprived of the right to vote by a final sentence, nor were legally incapacitated.

The Corts Valencianes had a minimum of 99 seats, with the electoral law fixing its size at that number. All were elected in three multi-member constituencies—corresponding to the provinces of Alicante, Castellón and Valencia, each of which was assigned an initial minimum of 20 seats and the remaining 39 distributed in proportion to population (with the seat-to-population ratio in any given province not exceeding three times that of any other)—using the D'Hondt method and closed-list proportional voting, with a five percent-threshold of valid votes (including blank ballots) regionally.

As a result of the aforementioned allocation, each Corts constituency was entitled the following seats:

Seats	Constituencies
40	Valencia^{(+4)}
35	Alicante^{(+5)}
24	Castellón^{(+1)}

The law did not provide for by-elections to fill vacant seats; instead, any vacancies arising after the proclamation of candidates and during the legislative term were filled by the next candidates on the party lists or, when required, by designated substitutes.

=== Outgoing parliament ===
The table below shows the composition of the parliamentary groups in the chamber at the time of dissolution.

Parliamentary composition in April 2007
Groups	Parties	Legislators	
Groups	Parties	Seats	Total
People's Parliamentary Group	PP	47	47
Socialist Parliamentary Group	PSPV–PSOE	35	35
The Agreement Parliamentary Group	EUPV	5	6
The Agreement Parliamentary Group	EV–EE	1	6
Mixed Group	CVa	1 (Note: Javier Tomás, former PP legislator.)	1

== Parties and candidates ==
The electoral law allowed for parties and federations registered in the interior ministry, alliances and groupings of electors to present lists of candidates. Parties and federations intending to form an alliance were required to inform the relevant electoral commission within 10 days of the election call, whereas groupings of electors needed to secure the signature of at least one percent of the electorate in the constituencies for which they sought election, disallowing electors from signing for more than one list. Amendments earlier in 2007 required a balanced composition of men and women in the electoral lists, so that candidates of either sex made up at least 40 percent of the total composition.

Below is a list of the main parties and alliances which contested the election:

Candidacy	Parties and alliances	Leading candidate	Ideology	Previous result		Gov.	Ref.
Candidacy	Parties and alliances	Leading candidate	Ideology	Vote %	Seats	Gov.	Ref.
PP	List: People's Party (PP)	Francisco Camps	Conservatism; Christian democracy	47.2%	48	Yes	
PSPV–PSOE	List: Socialist Party of the Valencian Country (PSPV–PSOE)	Joan Ignasi Pla	Social democracy	36.0%	35	No	
Compromís PV	List: United Left of the Valencian Country (EUPV); Valencian Nationalist Bloc (Bloc); The Greens of the Valencian Country (EVPV); The Greens–Ecologist Left of the Valencian Country (EV–EE); Republican Left (IR)	Glòria Marcos	Valencian nationalism Eco-socialism; Green politics	11.0%	6	No	

== Opinion polls ==
The tables below list opinion polling results in reverse chronological order, showing the most recent first and using the dates when the survey fieldwork was done, as opposed to the date of publication. Where the fieldwork dates are unknown, the date of publication is given instead. The highest percentage figure in each polling survey is displayed with its background shaded in the leading party's colour. If a tie ensues, this is applied to the figures with the highest percentages. The "Lead" column on the right shows the percentage-point difference between the parties with the highest percentages in a poll.

=== Voting intention estimates ===
The table below lists weighted voting intention estimates. Refusals are generally excluded from the party vote percentages, while question wording and the treatment of "don't know" responses and those not intending to vote may vary between polling organisations. When available, seat projections determined by the polling organisations are displayed below (or in place of) the percentages in a smaller font; 50 seats were required for an absolute majority in the Corts Valencianes (45 in the 2003 election).

Color key:

Exit poll

Polling firm/Commissioner	Fieldwork date	Sample size	Turnout	PP	PSPV	EUPV	Bloc–EV	UV	CVa	CPV	Lead
2007 regional election	27 May 2007	—N/a	70.1	52.5; 54	34.5; 38	(Note: Within CPV.)		0.9; 0	0.7; 0	8.0; 7	18.0
Ipsos/RTVE	27 May 2007	?	?	? 50/53	? 37/40			–	–	? 7/9	?
UV/FSP	18 May 2007	?	?	? 45/49	? 41/45			–	–	? 8/10	?
Opina/El País	14–17 May 2007	?	?	50.0; 51/52	38.0; 39			–	–	9.5; 8/9	12.0
Grup Marest/Levante-EMV	10–16 May 2007	2,000	73.3	44.5; 48	37.6; 40			2.2; 0	2.6; 0	11.5; 11	6.9
Celeste-Tel/Terra	9–15 May 2007	?	?	48.8; 52/53	37.1; 38/39			–	–	8.4; 8/9	11.7
Opina/Cadena SER	13 May 2007	1,000	?	51.6; 54	37.5; 38			–	0.6; 0	8.6; 7	14.1
TNS Demoscopia/Antena 3	10 May 2007	?	?	? 50/52	? 37/39			–	–	? 9/10	?
Sigma Dos/El Mundo	27 Apr–8 May 2007	900	?	49.4; 50/53	36.8; 38/41			–	–	8.9; 8	12.6
Noxa/La Vanguardia	2–7 May 2007	800	?	50.5; 52/54	35.1; 35/37			2.2; 0	–	10.4; 9/11	15.4
CIS	9 Apr–6 May 2007	1,797	?	49.8; 53	36.0; 38			3.3; 0	–	8.2; 8	13.8
PP	8 Apr 2007	1,200	?	? 55/57	? 35/36			–	–	? 7/8	?
Grup Marest/Levante-EMV	28 Mar–5 Apr 2007	2,000	73.3	45.2; 49	37.4; 39			2.0; 0	2.0; 0	12.2; 11	7.8
Metroscopia/ABC	12 Feb 2007	?	70	51.4; 55	34.7; 36			–	–	8.4; 8	16.7
PP	12–20 Jan 2007	1,200	?	50.2; 55	34.9; 36			–	–	10.6; 8	15.3
Grup Marest/Levante-EMV	2–17 Jan 2007	2,000	72.0	44.7; 46; 42	38.2; 41; 37			1.5; 0; 0	–	12.6; 12; 10	6.5
Sigma Dos/El Mundo	16–24 Nov 2006	?	?	49.1; 53/56; 48/50	35.3; 37/40; 34/36	6.6; 6; 5	4.1; 0; 0	–	–	–	13.8
PP	23 Nov 2006	?	?	50.0	35.0	–	–	–	–	–	15.0
Opina/El País	2–3 Oct 2006	1,200	?	49.3	36.4	7.0	4.5	1.5	–	–	12.9
PSPV	18–25 Sep 2006	2,000	75	46.6; 47/48	40.5; 42/44			–	–	8.6; 8/9	6.1
PSPV	18–25 Sep 2006	2,000	75	46.1; 49/50	39.4; 44/45	5.9; 5	4.8; 0	–	–	–	6.7
Astel/PP	8–13 Sep 2006	1,014	73	49.8; 55	35.4; 38	6.9; 6	4.5; 0	2.1; 0	–	–	14.4
PSPV	13 Jul 2006	?	?	47.0	36.0	–	–	–	–	–	11.0
Grup Marest/Levante-EMV	23 May–1 Jun 2006	2,000	?	45.4; 48	38.9; 41			1.4; 0	–	11.3; 10	6.5
Grup Marest/Levante-EMV	23 May–1 Jun 2006	2,000	?	45.4; 50	38.9; 43	6.4; 6	4.9; 0	1.4; 0	–	–	6.5
Opimarco/PSPV	24 Apr–10 May 2006	750	?	46.6; 49	39.6; 41			1.6; 0	–	10.1; 9	7.0
Opimarco/PSPV	24 Apr–10 May 2006	750	?	46.6; 51	39.6; 43	5.5; 5	4.6; 0	1.6; 0	–	–	7.0
Betaconsulting/PP	28 Mar–8 Apr 2006	1,000	73	49.6; 55	36.0; 38	6.6; 6	3.7; 0	–	–	–	13.6
KMC/El Boletín	6 Mar 2006	?	?	49.2	36.5	5.5	3.3	1.3	1.7	–	12.7
Opimarco/PSPV	1–15 Dec 2005	750	?	46.7; 48/49	38.3; 41/43			2.2	–	10.0; 9/10	8.4
Opimarco/PSPV	1–15 Dec 2005	750	?	46.7; 49/50	38.3; 43/44	5.6; 6	4.4; 0	2.2; 0	–	–	8.4
KMC/El Boletín	21 Nov 2005	?	?	49.4	35.0	6.9	2.9	3.6	2.2	–	14.4
PP	17 Nov 2005	?	?	? 51	? 32	? 6	–	–	–	–	?
Opina/El País	9 Oct 2005	?	?	48.0	36.6	6.5	3.2	1.5	–	–	11.4
PP	12 Mar 2005	?	?	? 49	? 36	? 4	–	–	–	–	?
2004 EP election	13 Jun 2004	—N/a	50.5	49.7 (48)	42.2 (41)	3.3 (0)	1.1 (0)	0.5 (0)	–	–	7.5
2004 general election	14 Mar 2004	—N/a	77.7	46.8 (47)	42.4 (42)	4.7 (0)	1.5 (0)	–	–	–	4.4
2003 regional election	25 May 2003	—N/a	71.5	47.2; 48	36.0; 35	6.4; 6	4.7; 0	3.0; 0	–	–	11.2

=== Voting preferences ===
The table below lists raw, unweighted voting preferences.

Polling firm/Commissioner	Fieldwork date	Sample size	PP	PSPV	EUPV	Bloc–EV	UV	CPV	Question	X mark	Lead
2007 regional election (Note: Does not include non-resident citizens.)	27 May 2007	—N/a	37.1	24.4			0.7	5.7	—N/a	29.1	12.7
CIS	9 Apr–6 May 2007	1,797	35.9	24.0			0.7	5.3	25.3	6.1	11.9
2004 EP election	13 Jun 2004	—N/a	25.4	21.4	1.7	0.6	0.2	–	—N/a	49.0	4.0
2004 general election	14 Mar 2004	—N/a	36.7	33.2	3.6	1.2	–	–	—N/a	21.2	3.5
2003 regional election	25 May 2003	—N/a	33.9	25.8	4.6	3.4	2.1	–	—N/a	27.7	8.1

=== Victory preferences ===
The table below lists opinion polling on the victory preferences for each party in the event of a regional election taking place.

Polling firm/Commissioner	Fieldwork date	Sample size	PP	PSPV	UV	CPV	Other/ None	Question	Lead
Opina/Cadena SER	13 May 2007	1,000	42.8	33.4	0.2	2.1	7.7	13.8	9.4
CIS	9 Apr–6 May 2007	1,797	42.4	29.5	0.9	5.4	7.5	14.4	12.9

=== Victory likelihood ===
The table below lists opinion polling on the perceived likelihood of victory for each party in the event of a regional election taking place.

Polling firm/Commissioner	Fieldwork date	Sample size	PP	PSPV	UV	CPV	Other/ None	Question	Lead
Opina/Cadena SER	13 May 2007	1,000	73.0	7.6	–	–	0.1	19.3	65.4
CIS	9 Apr–6 May 2007	1,797	67.1	11.3	0.0	0.2	0.5	20.8	55.8

=== Preferred President ===
The table below lists opinion polling on leader preferences to become president of the Valencian Government.

Polling firm/Commissioner	Fieldwork date	Sample size					Other/ None/ Not care	Question	Lead
Polling firm/Commissioner	Fieldwork date	Sample size	Camps PP	Pla PSPV	Marcos EUPV	Miralles UV	Other/ None/ Not care	Question	Lead
Opina/Cadena SER	13 May 2007	1,000	45.6	29.0	2.5	0.7	7.0	15.2	16.6
Noxa/La Vanguardia	2–7 May 2007	800	51.0	17.0	2.0	2.0	18.0	10.0	34.0
CIS	9 Apr–6 May 2007	1,797	46.7	24.6	3.2	0.8	2.5	22.2	22.1

=== Predicted President ===
The table below lists opinion polling on the perceived likelihood for each leader to become president of the Valencian Government.

Polling firm/Commissioner	Fieldwork date	Sample size				Other/ None/ Not care	Question	Lead
Polling firm/Commissioner	Fieldwork date	Sample size	Camps PP	Pla PSPV	Marcos EUPV	Other/ None/ Not care	Question	Lead
Opina/Cadena SER	13 May 2007	1,000	76.8	7.7	0.5	0.3	14.7	69.1

== Results ==
=== Overall ===
← Summary of the 27 May 2007 Corts Valencianes election results →
Parties and alliances	Popular vote			Seats	
Parties and alliances	Votes	%	±pp	Total	+/−
People's Party (PP)	1,277,458	52.52	+5.35	54	+6
Socialist Party of the Valencian Country (PSPV–PSOE)	838,987	34.49	−1.47	38	+3
Commitment for the Valencian Country (Compromís PV)^{1}	195,116	8.02	−3.02	7	+1
Valencian Union–The Eco-pacifist Greens (UV–LVEP)	22,789	0.94	−2.04	0	±0
Valencian Coalition (CVa)	17,331	0.71	New	0	±0
Republican Left of the Valencian Country (ERPV)	11,686	0.48	+0.17	0	±0
Social Democratic Party (PSD)	10,187	0.42	New	0	±0
Spain 2000 (E–2000)	5,934	0.24	+0.13	0	±0
Communist Party of the Peoples of Spain (PCPE)	4,088	0.17	+0.01	0	±0
United for Valencia (UxV)	2,559	0.11	New	0	±0
Authentic Phalanx (FA)	2,493	0.10	±0.00	0	±0
Humanist Party (PH)	2,039	0.08	−0.03	0	±0
Movement for People's Unity–Republicans (MUP–R)	1,531	0.06	New	0	±0
Liberal Centre (CL)	1,511	0.06	New	0	±0
Renewal Liberal Centre (CLR)	1,461	0.06	New	0	±0
Spanish Phalanx of the CNSO (FE–JONS)	1,018	0.04	New	0	±0
Liberal Democratic Centre (CDL)	785	0.03	New	0	±0
National Democracy (DN)	706	0.03	±0.00	0	±0
Liberal Centrist Union (UCL)	427	0.02	New	0	±0
Blank ballots	34,348	1.41	−0.14		
Total	2,432,454			99	+10
Valid votes	2,432,454	99.33	−0.02		
Invalid votes	16,376	0.67	+0.02		
Votes cast / turnout	2,448,830	70.14	−1.37		
Abstentions	1,042,535	29.86	+1.37		
Registered voters	3,491,365				
Sources
Footnotes: ^{1} Commitment for the Valencian Country results are compared to the combined totals of United Left–The Greens–Valencian Left: Agreement and Valencian Nationalist Bloc–Green Left in the 2003 election.

Popular vote
PP	52.52%
PSPV–PSOE	34.49%
Compromís PV	8.02%
Others	3.56%
Blank ballots	1.41%

Seats
PP	54.54%
PSPV–PSOE	38.38%
Compromís PV	7.07%

=== Distribution by constituency ===
Constituency	PP		PSPV		CPV	
Constituency	%	S	%	S	%	S
Alicante	51.8	19	36.6	14	6.8	2
Castellón	49.3	12	38.0	10	7.8	2
Valencia	53.6	23	32.5	14	8.8	3
Total	52.5	54	34.5	38	8.0	7

== Aftermath ==
=== Government formation ===
Investiture; Nomination of Francisco Camps (PP)
Ballot →	25 June 2007
Required majority →	50 out of 99
Yes: • PP (54)	54 / 99
No: • PSPV (37); • Compromís PV (7)	44 / 99
Abstentions	0 / 99
Absentees	0 / 99

== Bibliography ==
- Ley Orgánica 5/1982, de 1 de julio, de Estatuto de Autonomía de la Comunidad Valenciana (Organic Law 1/1982). Official State Gazette (in Spanish). 1 July 1982 [version as of 2 July 2002]. BOE-A-1982-17235.
- Ley 5/1983, de 30 de diciembre, del Consell (Law 5/1983). Official State Gazette (in Spanish). 30 December 1983 [version as of 23 March 2007]. BOE-A-1984-3460.
- Ley Orgánica 5/1985, de 19 de junio, del Régimen Electoral General (Organic Law 5/1985). Official State Gazette (in Spanish). 19 June 1985 [version as of 20 April 2007]. BOE-A-1985-11672.
- Ley 1/1987, de 31 de marzo, Electoral Valenciana (Law 1/1987). Official State Gazette (in Spanish). 31 March 1987 [version as of 6 April 1987]. BOE-A-1987-9636.
- Ley Orgánica 1/2006, de 10 de abril, de Reforma de la Ley Orgánica 5/1982, de 1 de julio, de Estatuto de Autonomía de la Comunidad Valenciana (Organic Law 1/2006). Official State Gazette (in Spanish). 10 April 2006 [version as of 11 April 2006]. BOE-A-1982-17235.
- Decreto 4/2007, de 2 de abril, del president de la Generalitat, de disolución de Les Corts y convocatoria de elecciones a las mismas (PDF) (Decree 4/2007). Official Journal of the Valencian Government (in Spanish). 3 April 2007.
