= 2003 Valencian regional election =

Election in the Spanish region of the Valencian Community

- 25 May 2003

All 89 seats in the Corts Valencianes 45 seats needed for a majority
- Opinion polls
- Registered: 3,423,098 ▲1.8%
- Turnout: 2,447,224 (71.5%) ▲3.7 pp
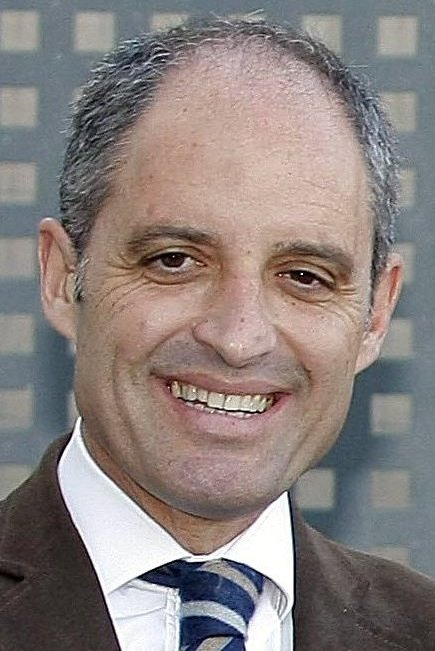

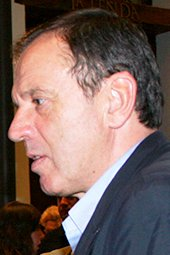

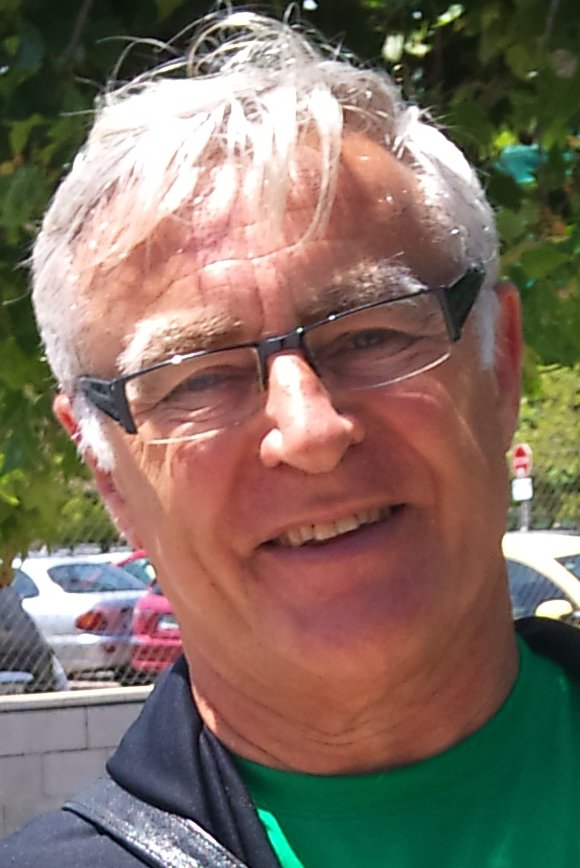
	First party	Second party	Third party
Leader	Francisco Camps	Joan Ignasi Pla	Joan Ribó
Party	PP	PSPV–PSOE	L'Entesa
Leader since	10 July 2002	24 September 2000	1997
Leader's seat	Valencia	Valencia	Valencia
Last election	49 seats, 47.9%	35 seats, 33.9%	5 seats, 6.1%
Seats won	48	35	6
Seat change	▼1	0	▲1
Popular vote	1,146,780	874,288	154,494
Percentage	47.2%	36.0%	6.4%
Swing	▼0.7 pp	▲2.1 pp	▲0.3 pp
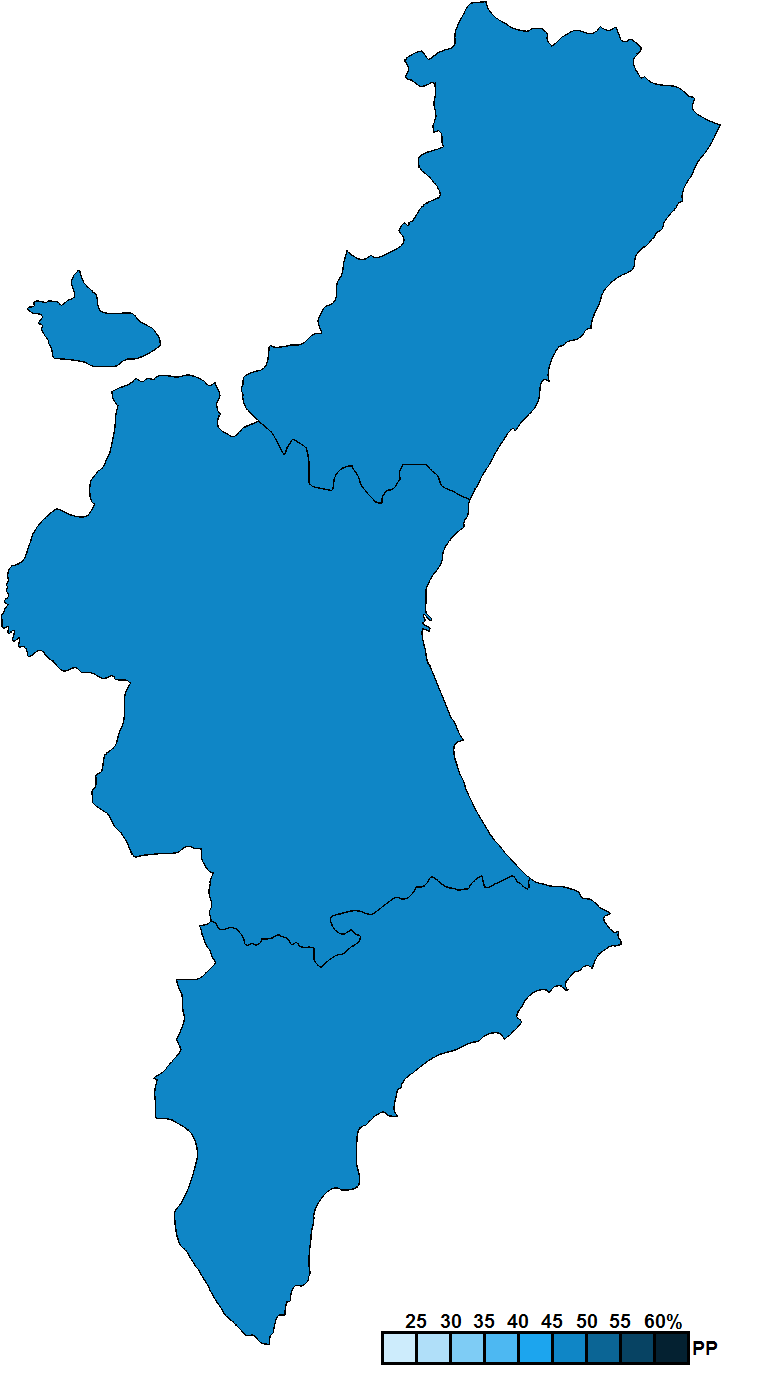
President before election
José Luis Olivas
PP
Elected President
Francisco Camps
PP

A regional election was held in the Valencian Community on 25 May 2003 to elect the 6th Corts of the autonomous community. All 89 seats in the Corts were up for election. It was held concurrently with regional elections in twelve other autonomous communities and local elections all across Spain.

Despite growing discontent with the nationwide José María Aznar's government, the People's Party (PP) was able to comfortably retain its absolute majority in the Corts, losing only one seat compared to 1999, which was gained by the Agreement (L'Entesa) alliance led by United Left of the Valencian Country (EUPV). The Socialist Party of the Valencian Country (PSPV–PSOE), while increasing its vote share in two percentage points compared to its 1999 result, failed to translate it into any new seats. Valencian Union (UV), the former PP coalition partner during the first Zaplana government (1995–1999), continued its decline into irrelevance and fell below 3%, depriving it of any possibility of overcoming the five percent threshold to enter the Corts.

Francisco Camps became the new president of the Valencian Government succeeding José Luis Olivas, who had replaced Eduardo Zaplana in 2002 after the latter was named Labour and Social Affairs minister in Aznar's second cabinet.

== Overview ==
Under the 1982 Statute of Autonomy, the Corts Valencianes were the unicameral legislature of the Valencian Community, having legislative power in devolved matters, as well as the ability to grant or withdraw confidence from a regional president. The electoral and procedural rules were supplemented by national law provisions.

=== Date ===
The term of the Corts Valencianes expired four years after the date of their previous election, with election day being fixed for the fourth Sunday of May every four years. The election decree was required to be issued no later than 54 days before the scheduled election date and published on the following day in the Official Journal of the Valencian Government (DOGV). The previous election was held on 13 June 1999, setting the date for election day on the fourth Sunday of May four years later, which was 25 May 2003.

The Corts Valencianes could not be dissolved before the expiration date of parliament.

The Corts Valencianes were officially dissolved on 1 April 2003 with the publication of the corresponding decree in the DOGV, setting election day for 25 May and scheduling for the chamber to reconvene on 12 June.

=== Electoral system ===
Voting for the Corts was based on universal suffrage, comprising all Spanish nationals over 18 years of age, registered in the Valencian Community and with full political rights, provided that they had not been deprived of the right to vote by a final sentence, nor were legally incapacitated.

The Corts Valencianes had a minimum of 75 and a maximum of 100 seats, with the electoral law fixing its size at 89. All were elected in three multi-member constituencies—corresponding to the provinces of Alicante, Castellón and Valencia, each of which was assigned an initial minimum of 20 seats and the remaining 29 distributed in proportion to population (with the seat-to-population ratio in any given province not exceeding three times that of any other)—using the D'Hondt method and closed-list proportional voting, with a five percent-threshold of valid votes (including blank ballots) regionally.

As a result of the aforementioned allocation, each Corts constituency was entitled the following seats:

Seats	Constituencies
36	Valencia^{(−1)}
30	Alicante
23	Castellón^{(+1)}

The law did not provide for by-elections to fill vacant seats; instead, any vacancies arising after the proclamation of candidates and during the legislative term were filled by the next candidates on the party lists or, when required, by designated substitutes.

=== Outgoing parliament ===
The table below shows the composition of the parliamentary groups in the chamber at the time of dissolution.

Parliamentary composition in April 2003
Groups	Parties	Legislators	
Groups	Parties	Seats	Total
People's Parliamentary Group	PP	49	49
Socialist–Progressives Parliamentary Group	PSPV–PSOE	34	34
United Left Parliamentary Group	EUPV	5	5
Mixed Group	EV–IPV	1 (Note: Joan Francesc Peris, former PSPV legislator.)	1

== Parties and candidates ==
The electoral law allowed for parties and federations registered in the interior ministry, alliances and groupings of electors to present lists of candidates. Parties and federations intending to form an alliance were required to inform the relevant electoral commission within 10 days of the election call, whereas groupings of electors needed to secure the signature of at least one percent of the electorate in the constituencies for which they sought election, disallowing electors from signing for more than one list.

Below is a list of the main parties and alliances which contested the election:

Candidacy	Parties and alliances	Leading candidate	Ideology	Previous result		Gov.	Ref.
Candidacy	Parties and alliances	Leading candidate	Ideology	Vote %	Seats	Gov.	Ref.
PP	List: People's Party (PP)	Francisco Camps	Conservatism; Christian democracy	47.9%	49	Yes	
PSPV–PSOE	List: Socialist Party of the Valencian Country (PSPV–PSOE)	Joan Ignasi Pla	Social democracy	33.9%	35	No	
L'Entesa	List: United Left of the Valencian Country (EUPV) – Communist Party of the Valencian Country (PCPV) – Revolutionary Workers' Party (POR) – Workers' Revolutionary Party–Revolutionary Left (PRT–IR); The Greens (EV/LV); Valencian Left (EV)	Joan Ribó	Valencian nationalism Socialism; Green politics	6.1%	5	No	
Bloc–EV	List: Valencian Nationalist Bloc (Bloc); Green Left (EV)	Pere Mayor	Valencian nationalism Eco-socialism; Green politics	4.5%	0	No	

== Opinion polls ==
The tables below list opinion polling results in reverse chronological order, showing the most recent first and using the dates when the survey fieldwork was done, as opposed to the date of publication. Where the fieldwork dates are unknown, the date of publication is given instead. The highest percentage figure in each polling survey is displayed with its background shaded in the leading party's colour. If a tie ensues, this is applied to the figures with the highest percentages. The "Lead" column on the right shows the percentage-point difference between the parties with the highest percentages in a poll.

=== Voting intention estimates ===
The table below lists weighted voting intention estimates. Refusals are generally excluded from the party vote percentages, while question wording and the treatment of "don't know" responses and those not intending to vote may vary between polling organisations. When available, seat projections determined by the polling organisations are displayed below (or in place of) the percentages in a smaller font; 45 seats were required for an absolute majority in the Corts Valencianes.

Color key:

Exit poll

Polling firm/Commissioner	Fieldwork date	Sample size	Turnout	PP	PSPV	EUPV	UV	Bloc–EV	Lead
2003 regional election	25 May 2003	—N/a	71.5	47.2; 48	36.0; 35	6.4; 6	3.0; 0	4.7; 0	11.2
Sigma Dos/Antena 3	25 May 2003	?	?	? 46/49	? 34/37	? 6	–	–	?
Ipsos–Eco/RTVE	25 May 2003	?	?	? 46/48	? 35/37	? 4/6	–	–	?
Insight/La Razón	19 May 2003	?	?	47.6; 47/50	? 33/37	? 4/5	–	–	?
Opina/El País	18 May 2003	?	?	46.0; 46/47	38.0; 38	6.0; 4/5	3.0; 0	3.0; 0	8.0
GES/PSPV	9–15 May 2003	2,000	72.6	44.0; 43/44	39.9; 40/41	6.7; 5	3.9; 0	4.6; 0	4.1
Investratègia/Bloc–EV	9–11 May 2003	1,500	68.8	45.5; 44/47	37.5; 33/36	6.5; 4/5	3.2; 0	5.6; 4/5	8.0
CIS	22 Mar–28 Apr 2003	2,096	80.0	41.9; 44	37.9; 39	7.4; 6	3.9; 0	4.1; 0	4.0
Vox Pública/El Periódico	25–27 Apr 2003	800	?	45.0– 46.0; 45/48	36.5– 37.5; 35/39	5.0– 6.0; 3/5	–	4.5– 5.5; 0/4	8.5
Insight/PP	9–18 Dec 2002	1,200	?	51.1; 49/52	34.3; 34/36	6.1; 3/4	3.9; 0	3.9; 0	16.8
GES/PSPV	15–23 Oct 2002	3,000	?	44.9; 44	40.2; 40	5.7; 5	3.8; 0	3.9; 0	4.7
CIS	9 Sep–9 Oct 2002	730	76.6	47.7	34.1	6.7	–	–	13.6
GES/PSPV	10 Dec–25 Apr 2002	27,000	?	46.1; 46	37.8; 38	5.9; 5	–	3.3; 0	8.3
GES/PSPV	10 Jan–10 Feb 2002	10,500	?	47.5; 47	38.4; 38	5.2; 4	3.4; 0	3.5; 0	9.1
Insight/PP	26 Dec–10 Jan 2002	900	?	52.1; 52/53	33.1; 31/33	5.4; 4/5	1.7; 0	3.6; 0	19.0
Insight/PP	1–8 Jul 2000	1,200	?	51.8; 49/55	31.0; 29/32	5.8; 4/5	3.9; 0	5.0; 0/4	20.8
2000 general election	12 Mar 2000	—N/a	72.7	52.1 (52)	34.0 (34)	5.8 (3)	2.4 (0)	2.4 (0)	18.1
Insight/PP	3 Jan 2000	?	?	52.8	30.3	–	–	–	22.5
1999 regional election	13 Jun 1999	—N/a	67.8	47.9; 49	33.9; 35	6.1; 5	4.7; 0	4.5; 0	14.0

=== Voting preferences ===
The table below lists raw, unweighted voting preferences.

Polling firm/Commissioner	Fieldwork date	Sample size	PP	PSPV	EUPV	UV	Bloc–EV	Question	X mark	Lead
2003 regional election (Note: Does not include non-resident citizens.)	25 May 2003	—N/a	33.9	25.8	4.6	2.1	3.4	—N/a	27.7	8.1
CIS	22 Mar–28 Apr 2003	2,096	27.3	25.8	4.7	1.6	2.3	29.6	4.4	1.5
Vox Pública/El Periódico	25–27 Apr 2003	800	33.8	26.5	3.4	0.9	2.8	24.7	3.5	7.3
CIS	9 Sep–9 Oct 2002	730	31.6	22.6	4.0	–	–	25.4	9.9	9.0
2000 general election	12 Mar 2000	—N/a	38.0	24.8	4.2	1.7	1.8	—N/a	26.6	13.2
1999 regional election	13 Jun 1999	—N/a	32.1	22.7	4.1	3.1	3.0	—N/a	32.0	9.4

=== Victory preferences ===
The table below lists opinion polling on the victory preferences for each party in the event of a regional election taking place.

Polling firm/Commissioner	Fieldwork date	Sample size	PP	PSPV	EUPV	UV	Bloc–EV	Other/ None	Question	Lead
CIS	22 Mar–28 Apr 2003	2,096	34.5	36.1	4.0	2.0	2.3	1.6	19.4	1.6

=== Victory likelihood ===
The table below lists opinion polling on the perceived likelihood of victory for each party in the event of a regional election taking place.

Polling firm/Commissioner	Fieldwork date	Sample size	PP	PSPV	EUPV	UV	Bloc–EV	Other/ None	Question	Lead
CIS	22 Mar–28 Apr 2003	2,096	48.4	26.8	0.1	0.1	0.1	0.1	24.4	21.6

=== Preferred President ===
The table below lists opinion polling on leader preferences to become president of the Valencian Government.

Polling firm/Commissioner	Fieldwork date	Sample size							Other/ None/ Not care	Question	Lead
Polling firm/Commissioner	Fieldwork date	Sample size	Camps PP	Pla PSPV	Ribó EUPV	Chiquillo UV	Juan UV	Mayor Bloc	Other/ None/ Not care	Question	Lead
CIS	22 Mar–28 Apr 2003	2,096	21.2	18.6	2.9	1.0	–	1.7	4.6	50.0	2.6
Vox Pública/El Periódico	25–27 Apr 2003	800	20.9	18.1	4.0	–	0.9	4.0	16.1	36.1	2.8

== Results ==
=== Overall ===
← Summary of the 25 May 2003 Corts Valencianes election results →
Parties and alliances	Popular vote			Seats	
Parties and alliances	Votes	%	±pp	Total	+/−
People's Party (PP)	1,146,780	47.17	−0.71	48	−1
Socialist Party of the Valencian Country (PSPV–PSOE)	874,288	35.96	+2.05	35	±0
United Left–The Greens–Valencian Left: The Agreement (L'Entesa)	154,494	6.35	+0.30	6	+1
Valencian Nationalist Bloc–Green Left (Bloc–EV)	114,011	4.69	+0.16	0	±0
Union–Valencian Union (UV)	72,557	2.98	−1.70	0	±0
Republican Left of the Valencian Country (ERPV)	7,609	0.31	New	0	±0
Communist Party of the Peoples of Spain (PCPE)	3,884	0.16	New	0	±0
Democratic and Social Centre (CDS)	3,189	0.13	±0.00	0	±0
Regional Party of the Valencian Community (PRCV)	2,868	0.12	New	0	±0
Humanist Party (PH)	2,747	0.11	+0.01	0	±0
Spain 2000 (E–2000)	2,650	0.11	New	0	±0
Federal Republican Party (PRF)	2,545	0.10	+0.03	0	±0
Authentic Phalanx (FA)	2,332	0.10	New	0	±0
Family and Life Party (PFyV)	1,690	0.07	New	0	±0
Another Democracy is Possible (ODeP)	1,156	0.05	New	0	±0
National Democracy (DN)	798	0.03	New	0	±0
Blank ballots	37,805	1.55	±0.00		
Total	2,431,403			89	±0
Valid votes	2,431,403	99.35	−0.06		
Invalid votes	15,821	0.65	+0.06		
Votes cast / turnout	2,447,224	71.49	+3.68		
Abstentions	975,874	28.51	−3.68		
Registered voters	3,423,098				

Popular vote
PP	47.17%
PSPV–PSOE	35.96%
L'Entesa	6.35%
Bloc–EV	4.69%
UV	2.98%
Others	1.29%
Blank ballots	1.55%

Seats
PP	53.93%
PSPV–PSOE	39.33%
L'Entesa	6.74%

=== Distribution by constituency ===
Constituency	PP		PSPV		L'Entesa	
Constituency	%	S	%	S	%	S
Alicante	48.3	16	37.2	12	5.9	2
Castellón	48.1	13	36.5	9	4.4	1
Valencia	46.3	19	35.1	14	7.0	3
Total	47.2	48	36.0	35	6.4	6

== Aftermath ==
=== Government formation ===
Investiture
Candidate	Ballot →	18 June 2003	
Candidate	Required majority →	45 out of 89	
Francisco Camps (PP)	Yes: • PP (48)	48 / 89	check
Francisco Camps (PP)	No: • PSPV (34); • L'Entesa (6)	40 / 89	check
Francisco Camps (PP)	Absentees	0 / 89	check
Francisco Camps (PP)	Abstentions: • PSPV (1)	0 / 89	check
Joan Ignasi Pla (PSPV)	Cancelled		
Joan Ribó (L'Entesa)	Cancelled		

=== 2006 motion of no confidence ===
Motion of no confidence Nomination of Joan Ignasi Pla (PSPV)
Ballot →	4 October 2006
Required majority →	45 out of 89
Yes: • PSPV (35)	35 / 89
No: • PP (47)	47 / 89
Abstentions: • L'Entesa (6); • CVa (1)	7 / 89
Absentees	0 / 89

== Bibliography ==
- Ley Orgánica 5/1982, de 1 de julio, de Estatuto de Autonomía de la Comunidad Valenciana (Organic Law 1/1982). Official State Gazette (in Spanish). 1 July 1982 [version as of 2 July 2002]. BOE-A-1982-17235.
- Ley 5/1983, de 30 de diciembre, de Gobierno Valenciano (Law 5/1983). Official State Gazette (in Spanish). 30 December 1983 [version as of 7 March 2002]. BOE-A-1984-3460.
- Ley Orgánica 5/1985, de 19 de junio, del Régimen Electoral General (Organic Law 5/1985). Official State Gazette (in Spanish). 19 June 1985 [version as of 11 March 2003]. BOE-A-1985-11672.
- Ley 1/1987, de 31 de marzo, Electoral Valenciana (Law 1/1987). Official State Gazette (in Spanish). 31 March 1987 [version as of 6 April 1987]. BOE-A-1987-9636.
- Decreto 3/2003, de 31 de marzo, del Presidente de la Generalitat, de disolución y convocatoria de elecciones a las Cortes Valencianas (PDF) (Decree 3/2003). Official Journal of the Valencian Government (in Spanish). 31 March 2003.
