= Esquerra Unida–L'Entesa =

- Leader: Joan Ribó (2003); Glòria Marcos (2003–2007)
- Founded: 2003
- Dissolved: 2007
- Merger of: EUPV; EV–EE (2004–2007); EV (2003–2004); EV/LV (2003–2004); PSPV–PSOE (2003, Sueca)
- Succeeded by: Commitment for the Valencian Country; United and Republican Left
- Ideology: Socialism; Communism; Valencian nationalism Ecologism; Republicanism; Federalism
- Political position: Left-wing

Esquerra Unida–L'Entesa (English: United Left–The Agreement) or simply L'Entesa (English: The Agreement) was a Valencian electoral alliance formed by United Left of the Valencian Country (EUPV), Valencian Left (EV) and The Greens (EV/LV) to contest the 2003 Valencian regional election. The alliance also included the Socialist Party of the Valencian Country (PSPV–PSOE) in six municipalities in the judicial district of Sueca to contest the 2003 Spanish local elections.

Ahead of the 2004 Spanish general election, L'Entesa explored a coalition with the Valencian Nationalist Bloc (Bloc), which was ultimately rejected by the later. Subsequently, EV/LV announced its withdrawal from the alliance in order to run in coalition with the PSOE, whereas EV choose not to renew their alliance with EUPV for the 2004 general election. As a result, the alliance was reduced to EUPV. It was later joined for the 2004 European Parliament election by the platform of regional LV MP Carles Arnal, who would go on to form The Greens–Ecologist Left of the Valencian Country (EV–EE) in response to LV's alliance with the PSOE for both the general and European Parliament elections.

The alliance would be succeeded by the Commitment for the Valencian Country and United and Republican Left coalitions for the 2007 Valencian regional and 2008 Spanish general elections, respectively.

== Composition ==
=== 2003 Valencian regional and local elections ===
Party
United Left of the Valencian Country (EUPV)
Valencian Left (EV)
The Greens (EV/LV)
Socialist Party of the Valencian Country (PSPV–PSOE) (Note: The Socialist Party of the Valencian Country (PSPV–PSOE) only joined the coalition in six municipalities of the judicial district of Sueca to contest the 2003 Spanish local elections.)

=== 2004 Spanish general election ===
Party
United Left of the Valencian Country (EUPV)

=== 2004 European Parliament election ===
Party
United Left of the Valencian Country (EUPV)
The Greens–Ecologist Left of the Valencian Country (EV–EE)
