= Botella =

Botella may refer to:

- Ana Botella (born 1953), Spanish politician
- Félix Mantilla Botella (born 1974), Spanish tennis player
- Juan Botella (1941–1970), Mexican diver
- Lola Botella (1945–2023), Spanish politician
- Monic Cecconi-Botella (1936–2025), French pianist, music educator and composer
- Salvador Botella (1929–2006), Spanish road bicycle racer
