= 2011 Valencian regional election =

Election in the Spanish region of the Valencian Community

- 22 May 2011

All 99 seats in the Corts Valencianes 50 seats needed for a majority
- Opinion polls
- Registered: 3,549,687 ▲1.7%
- Turnout: 2,491,588 (70.2%) ▲0.1 pp
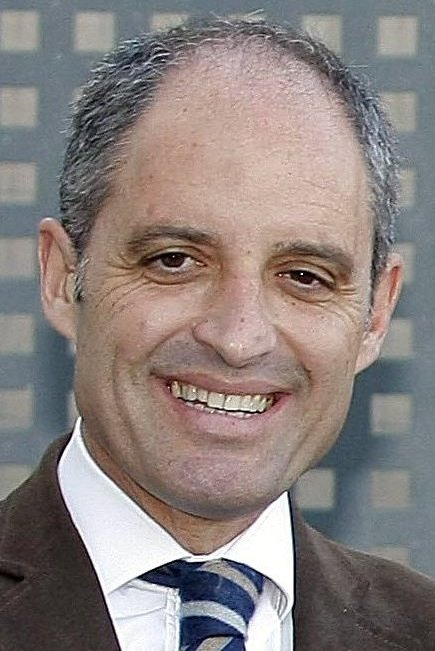

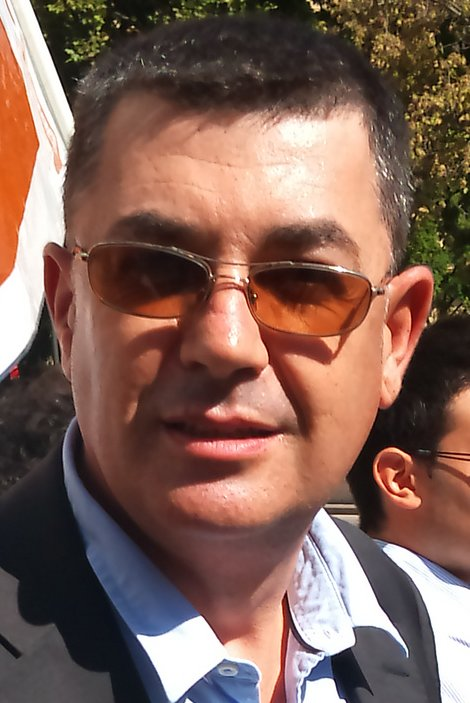

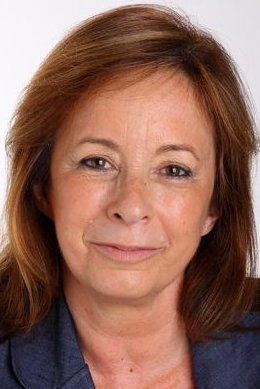
	First party	Second party	Third party
Leader	Francisco Camps	Jorge Alarte	Enric Morera
Party	PP	PSPV–PSOE	Compromís
Leader since	10 July 2002	28 September 2008	17 April 2010
Leader's seat	Valencia	Valencia	Valencia
Last election	54 seats, 52.5%	38 seats, 34.5%	2 seats (CPV) (Note: Within the Compromís PV alliance in the 2007 election: EUPV (5 seats) and Bloc (2 seats).)
Seats won	55	33	6
Seat change	▲1	▼5	▲4
Popular vote	1,211,112	687,141	176,213
Percentage	49.4%	28.0%	7.2%
Swing	▼3.1 pp	▼6.5 pp	n/a
	Fourth party
Leader	Marga Sanz
Party	EUPV
Leader since	8 March 2009
Leader's seat	Valencia
Last election	5 seats (CPV)
Seats won	5
Seat change	0
Popular vote	144,703
Percentage	5.9%
Swing	n/a
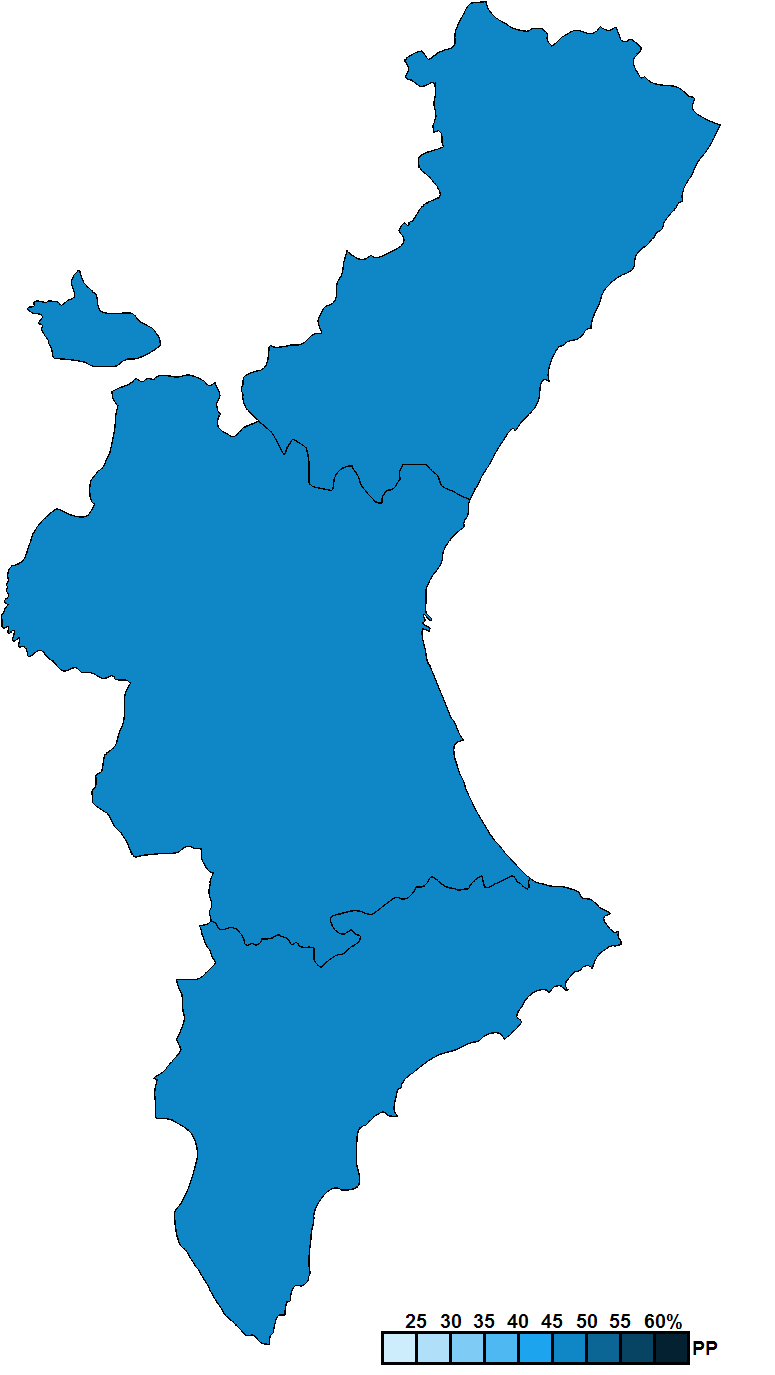
President before election
Francisco Camps
PP
President after election
Francisco Camps
PP

A regional election was held in the Valencian Community on 22 May 2011 to elect the 8th Corts of the autonomous community. All 99 seats in the Corts were up for election. It was held concurrently with regional elections in twelve other autonomous communities and local elections all across Spain.

The election was won by the People's Party (PP), which increased its majority despite a drop in its vote share. The Socialist Party of the Valencian Country (PSPV–PSOE) continued its long term decline and, similarly to the PSOE's performance in other regions with concurrent elections, it sustained severed damage from voters—weary of the ongoing financial crisis affecting the country—and obtained one of its worst electoral results since the autonomous community's inception. On the other hand, the electoral alliance between United Left of the Valencian Country (EUPV) and the Valencian Nationalist Bloc (Bloc) which contested the 2007 election had dissolved, with both parties entering the legislature much at the expense of the declining PSOE. The Bloc, running together with Valencian People's Initiative (IdPV) and The Greens–Ecologist Left of the Valencian Country (EV–EE) under the Coalició Compromís umbrella, entered parliament on its own for the first time in history.

While Francisco Camps was able to get re-elected as president, his alleged implication in the Gürtel affair would see his resignation just one month into his third term in July. He would be succeeded by Alberto Fabra, who would serve in the post for the remainder of the term.

== Overview ==
Under the 1982 Statute of Autonomy, the Corts Valencianes were the unicameral legislature of the Valencian Community, having legislative power in devolved matters, as well as the ability to grant or withdraw confidence from a regional president. The electoral and procedural rules were supplemented by national law provisions.

=== Date ===
The term of the Corts Valencianes expired four years after the date of their previous election. Amendments in 2006—taking effect after the 2007 election—abolished fixed-term elections, instead allowing the term of the Corts to expire after an early dissolution. The election decree was required to be issued no later than 25 days before the scheduled expiration date of parliament and published on the following day in the Official Journal of the Valencian Government (DOGV), with election day taking place 54 days after the decree's publication. The previous election was held on 27 May 2007, which meant that the chamber's term would have expired on 27 May 2011. The election decree was required to be published in the DOGV no later than 3 May 2011, setting the latest possible date for election day on 26 June 2011.

The regional president had the prerogative to dissolve the Corts Valencianes at any given time and call a snap election, provided that no motion of no confidence was in process. In the event of an investiture process failing to elect a regional president within a two-month period from the first ballot, the Corts were to be automatically dissolved and a fresh election called.

The Corts Valencianes were officially dissolved on 29 March 2011 with the publication of the corresponding decree in the DOGV, setting election day for 22 May and scheduling for the chamber to reconvene on 9 June.

=== Electoral system ===
Voting for the Corts was based on universal suffrage, comprising all Spanish nationals over 18 years of age, registered in the Valencian Community and with full political rights, provided that they had not been deprived of the right to vote by a final sentence, nor were legally incapacitated. Amendments earlier in 2011 required non-resident citizens to apply for voting, a system known as "begged" voting (Spanish: Voto rogado).

The Corts Valencianes had a minimum of 99 seats, with the electoral law fixing its size at that number. All were elected in three multi-member constituencies—corresponding to the provinces of Alicante, Castellón and Valencia, each of which was assigned an initial minimum of 20 seats and the remaining 39 distributed in proportion to population (with the seat-to-population ratio in any given province not exceeding three times that of any other)—using the D'Hondt method and closed-list proportional voting, with a five percent-threshold of valid votes (including blank ballots) regionally.

As a result of the aforementioned allocation, each Corts constituency was entitled the following seats:

Seats	Constituencies
40	Valencia
35	Alicante
24	Castellón

The law did not provide for by-elections to fill vacant seats; instead, any vacancies arising after the proclamation of candidates and during the legislative term were filled by the next candidates on the party lists or, when required, by designated substitutes.

=== Outgoing parliament ===
The table below shows the composition of the parliamentary groups in the chamber at the time of dissolution.

Parliamentary composition in March 2011
Groups	Parties	Legislators	
Groups	Parties	Seats	Total
People's Parliamentary Group	PP	54	54
Socialist Parliamentary Group	PSPV–PSOE	38	38
Commitment Parliamentary Group	Bloc	2	4
Commitment Parliamentary Group	IdPV	2	4
Non-Inscrits	EUPV	3	3

== Parties and candidates ==
The electoral law allowed for parties and federations registered in the interior ministry, alliances and groupings of electors to present lists of candidates. Parties and federations intending to form an alliance were required to inform the relevant electoral commission within 10 days of the election call, whereas groupings of electors needed to secure the signature of at least one percent of the electorate in the constituencies for which they sought election, disallowing electors from signing for more than one list. Additionally, a balanced composition of men and women was required in the electoral lists, so that candidates of either sex made up at least 40 percent of the total composition.

Below is a list of the main parties and alliances which contested the election:

Candidacy	Parties and alliances	Leading candidate	Ideology	Previous result		Gov.	Ref.
Candidacy	Parties and alliances	Leading candidate	Ideology	Vote %	Seats	Gov.	Ref.
PP	List: People's Party (PP)	Francisco Camps	Conservatism; Christian democracy	52.5%	54	Yes	
PSPV–PSOE	List: Socialist Party of the Valencian Country (PSPV–PSOE)	Jorge Alarte	Social democracy	34.5%	38	No	
EUPV	List: United Left of the Valencian Country (EUPV)	Marga Sanz	Socialism; Communism	8.0% (Note: Results for Compromís PV in the 2007 election.)	7	No	
Compromís	List: Valencian Nationalist Bloc (Bloc); Valencian People's Initiative (IdPV); The Greens–Ecologist Left of the Valencian Country (EV–EE)	Enric Morera	Valencianism; Progressivism; Green politics	8.0%	7	No	

== Opinion polls ==
The tables below list opinion polling results in reverse chronological order, showing the most recent first and using the dates when the survey fieldwork was done, as opposed to the date of publication. Where the fieldwork dates are unknown, the date of publication is given instead. The highest percentage figure in each polling survey is displayed with its background shaded in the leading party's colour. If a tie ensues, this is applied to the figures with the highest percentages. The "Lead" column on the right shows the percentage-point difference between the parties with the highest percentages in a poll.

=== Voting intention estimates ===
The table below lists weighted voting intention estimates. Refusals are generally excluded from the party vote percentages, while question wording and the treatment of "don't know" responses and those not intending to vote may vary between polling organisations. When available, seat projections determined by the polling organisations are displayed below (or in place of) the percentages in a smaller font; 50 seats were required for an absolute majority in the Corts Valencianes.

Color key:

Exit poll

Polling firm/Commissioner	Fieldwork date	Sample size	Turnout	PP	PSPV	EUPV	Compromís	UPyD	Lead
2011 regional election	22 May 2011	—N/a	70.2	49.4; 55	28.0; 33	5.9; 5	7.2; 6	2.5; 0	21.4
Ipsos–Eco/FORTA	22 May 2011	?	?	49.9; 56/59	27.6; 29/32	6.6; 5/6	6.4; 5/6	–	22.3
TNS Demoscopia/Antena 3	10–11 May 2011	1,500	68.2	51.3; 56/58	29.2; 32/34	8.3; 9	4.4; 0	–	23.1
Metroscopia/El País	9–10 May 2011	1,200	?	51.6; 59	28.7; 33	7.1; 7	4.2; 0	–	22.9
NC Report/La Razón	3–10 May 2011	?	?	54.9; 58/61	29.1; 33/34	? 5/6	–	–	25.8
GAD/La Gaceta	26 Apr–3 May 2011	893	?	54.1; 58	31.1; 35	7.2; 6	3.9; 0	–	23.0
Ikerfel/Vocento	19–26 Apr 2011	3,200	?	52.6; 58/60	30.1; 34/36	6.0; 3/5	3.2; 0	1.6; 0	22.5
NC Report/La Razón	25 Apr 2011	?	?	55.8; 58/61	29.2; 34/35	5.8; 4/6	4.1; 0	–	26.6
Celeste-Tel/Terra	13–20 Apr 2011	700	?	51.2; 57	28.9; 33	6.4; 5	5.8; 4	–	22.3
CIS	17 Mar–17 Apr 2011	1,983	?	53.1; 60	28.8; 33	7.1; 6	2.7; 0	1.7; 0	24.3
GAD/COPE	13–14 Apr 2011	402	?	54.2; 57/59	31.6; 33/35	6.7; 6/7	3.7; 0	–	22.6
Sigma Dos/El Mundo	11–14 Apr 2011	900	?	52.3; 56/59	32.6; 36/39	6.4; 4	3.5; 0	–	19.7
Obradoiro de Socioloxía/Público	4–7 Apr 2011	?	?	50.4; 55	32.6; 35	5.7; 5	5.7; 4	–	17.8
Inmerco/Valencia Plaza	30 Mar–5 Apr 2011	401	?	53.4	29.9	7.7	3.1	–	23.5
GAD/ABC	7–15 Mar 2011	1,200	?	55.1; 60	30.5; 33	6.8; 6	3.7; 0	–	24.6
Sigma Dos/El Mundo	17–21 Dec 2010	900	?	56.7; 63/65	27.3; 29/32	5.6; 4/5	3.0; 0	–	29.4
PSPV	5–15 Oct 2010	1,200	66.5	56.1; 60	29.9; 35	5.3; 4	4.0; 0	–	26.2
Metroscopia/El País	5–6 Oct 2010	1,000	?	51.2; 60	29.3; 33	6.7; 6	3.5; 0	–	21.9
Astel/PP	20 Sep–6 Oct 2010	1,600	?	54.8; 57/58	31.0; 33/34	8.5; 8	–	–	23.8
Área de Consultoría	6–10 Sep 2010	1,200	?	53.4; 57	31.7; 36	6.4; 6	3.5; 0	–	21.7
Astel/PP	19–23 Jul 2010	?	?	54.7; 57/58	31.2; 34/35	7.8; 7	–	–	23.5
Sigma Dos/El Mundo	24–27 May 2010	900	?	55.8; 59/64	30.7; 30/33	6.4; 4/6	2.5; 0	–	25.1
PSPV	21 May 2010	1,500	?	54.0; 58	31.6; 35	5.5; 6	4.5; 0	–	22.4
Inmerco/Valencia Plaza	26–30 Apr 2010	400	?	51.9	34.5	3.5	4.1	–	17.4
Astel/PP	6–29 Apr 2010	1,600	?	54.9; 57/58	32.4; 35/36	7.2; 6	–	–	22.5
Obradoiro de Socioloxía/Público	23–25 Mar 2010	800	?	51.0; 57/58	31.2; 35/36	8.0; 6	3.3; 0	1.7; 0	19.8
Astel/PP	10–16 Dec 2009	1,197	?	55.1; 57	32.8; 36	7.0; 6	–	–	22.3
PSPV	27 Nov 2009	?	?	51.2	35.6	5.8	3.6	–	15.6
Sigma Dos/El Mundo	4–5 Nov 2009	500	?	50.8	33.4	9.7		2.5	17.4
Metroscopia/El País	5–6 Oct 2009	?	?	53.3; 61	32.2; 36	5.3; 2	4.0; 0	–	21.1
Astel/PP	1–12 Sep 2009	1,204	?	54.1; 57	32.9; 35	7.5; 7	2.5; 0	–	21.2
2009 EP election	7 Jun 2009	—N/a	52.8	52.2 (58)	37.6 (41)	2.8 (0)	1.0 (0)	2.1 (0)	14.6
PSPV	10 May 2009	1,200	68.6	52.1; 57	32.7; 38	–	–	–	19.4
PP	16–26 Feb 2009	?	?	53.7; 57	33.6; 36	? 6	–	–	20.1
Metroscopia/El País	9 Oct 2008	?	?	55.4; 59	34.4; 40	–	–	–	21.0
2008 general election	9 Mar 2008	—N/a	78.8	51.6 (56)	41.0 (43)	2.7 (0)	1.1 (0)	0.7 (0)	10.6
2007 regional election	27 May 2007	—N/a	70.1	52.5; 54	34.5; 38	8.0; 7		–	18.0

=== Voting preferences ===
The table below lists raw, unweighted voting preferences.

Polling firm/Commissioner	Fieldwork date	Sample size	PP	PSPV	EUPV	Compromís	UPyD	Question	X mark	Lead
2011 regional election (Note: Does not include non-resident citizens.)	22 May 2011	—N/a	34.7	19.7	4.1	5.0	1.7	—N/a	28.5	15.0
CIS	17 Mar–17 Apr 2011	1,983	36.6	15.8	3.7	1.8	1.2	27.2	7.5	20.8
Obradoiro de Socioloxía/Público	4–7 Apr 2011	?	34.3	20.6	2.9	4.0	1.4	–	–	13.7
Obradoiro de Socioloxía/Público	23–25 Mar 2010	800	39.0	20.2	5.6	3.3	1.7	–	–	18.8
2009 EP election	7 Jun 2009	—N/a	27.8	19.9	1.5	0.5	1.1	—N/a	46.6	7.9
2008 general election	9 Mar 2008	—N/a	40.9	32.3	2.1	0.9	0.6	—N/a	20.3	8.6
2007 regional election	27 May 2007	—N/a	37.1	24.4	5.7		–	—N/a	29.1	12.7

=== Victory preferences ===
The table below lists opinion polling on the victory preferences for each party in the event of a regional election taking place.

Polling firm/Commissioner	Fieldwork date	Sample size	PP	PSPV	EUPV	Compromís	UPyD	Other/ None	Question	Lead
CIS	17 Mar–17 Apr 2011	1,983	42.1	20.7	4.2	1.7	1.6	12.1	17.5	21.4
GAD/COPE	13–14 Apr 2011	402	50.0	23.9	3.0	2.5	–	7.2	13.4	26.1

=== Victory likelihood ===
The table below lists opinion polling on the perceived likelihood of victory for each party in the event of a regional election taking place.

Polling firm/Commissioner	Fieldwork date	Sample size	PP	PSPV	EUPV	Compromís	UPyD	Other/ None	Question	Lead
CIS	17 Mar–17 Apr 2011	1,983	83.6	3.6	0.0	0.1	–	0.2	12.4	80.0
GAD/COPE	13–14 Apr 2011	402	84.3	7.5	–	–	–	0.5	7.7	76.8
Astel/PP	20 Sep–6 Oct 2010	1,600	76.3	9.9	–	–	–	3.2	10.6	66.4
Área de Consultoría	6–10 Sep 2010	1,200	70.6	11.1	–	–	–	18.3		59.5
Astel/PP	19–23 Jul 2010	?	77.1	5.8	–	–	–	2.0	12.8	71.3
Astel/PP	6–29 Apr 2010	1,600	74.7	10.0	–	–	–	1.5	13.8	64.7
Astel/PP	10–16 Dec 2009	1,197	73.1	12.5	–	–	–	0.8	13.6	60.6

=== Preferred President ===
The table below lists opinion polling on leader preferences to become president of the Valencian Government.

Polling firm/Commissioner	Fieldwork date	Sample size							Other/ None/ Not care	Question	Lead
Polling firm/Commissioner	Fieldwork date	Sample size	Camps PP	Alarte PSPV	Sanz EUPV	Morera Compromís	Oltra Compromís	Soriano UPyD	Other/ None/ Not care	Question	Lead
GAD/La Gaceta	26 Apr–3 May 2011	893	48.7	21.2	–	–	–	–	–	–	27.5
CIS	17 Mar–17 Apr 2011	1,983	40.4	16.5	2.0	2.2	–	0.8	7.8	30.3	23.9
GAD/COPE	13–14 Apr 2011	402	52.5	20.1	2.2	2.7	–	–	13.4	9.0	32.4
Obradoiro de Socioloxía/Público	4–7 Apr 2011	?	41.8	25.2	–	–	–	–	33.0		16.6
Metroscopia/El País	5–6 Oct 2010	1,000	40.0	39.0	–	–	–	–	21.0		1.0
Astel/PP	19–23 Jul 2010	?	48.4	18.4	0.7	3.5	–	–	29.0		30.0
Astel/PP	6–29 Apr 2010	1,600	45.5	17.9	2.5	0.7	2.2	–	34.7		27.6
Obradoiro de Socioloxía/Público	23–25 Mar 2010	800	38.3	20.0	–	–	–	–	41.7		18.3
Astel/PP	10–16 Dec 2009	1,197	45.6	15.3	0.6	1.1	2.7	–	34.7		30.3
PP	16–26 Feb 2009	?	53.1	15.6	–	–	–	–	31.3		37.5

=== Predicted President ===
The table below lists opinion polling on the perceived likelihood for each leader to become president.

Polling firm/Commissioner	Fieldwork date	Sample size			Other/ None/ Not care	Question	Lead
Polling firm/Commissioner	Fieldwork date	Sample size	Camps PP	Alarte PSPV	Other/ None/ Not care	Question	Lead
Obradoiro de Socioloxía/Público	4–7 Apr 2011	?	77.3	6.0	16.7		71.3
Obradoiro de Socioloxía/Público	23–25 Mar 2010	800	68.4	7.1	24.5		61.3

== Results ==
=== Overall ===
← Summary of the 22 May 2011 Corts Valencianes election results →
Parties and alliances	Popular vote			Seats	
Parties and alliances	Votes	%	±pp	Total	+/−
People's Party (PP)	1,211,112	49.42	−3.10	55	+1
Socialist Party of the Valencian Country (PSPV–PSOE)	687,141	28.04	−6.45	33	−5
Bloc–Initiative–Greens: Commitment Coalition (Compromís)^{1}	176,213	7.19	n/a	6	+4
United Left of the Valencian Country (EUPV)^{1}	144,703	5.90	n/a	5	±0
Union, Progress and Democracy (UPyD)	60,859	2.48	New	0	±0
Greens and Eco-pacifists (VyE)	31,808	1.30	New	0	±0
Spain 2000 (E–2000)	12,191	0.50	+0.26	0	±0
Republican Left of the Valencian Country (ERPV)	11,129	0.45	−0.03	0	±0
Anti-Bullfighting Party Against Mistreatment of Animals (PACMA)	9,306	0.38	New	0	±0
Valencian Coalition (CVa)	9,183	0.37	−0.34	0	±0
Liberal Democratic Centre (CDL)	8,203	0.33	+0.30	0	±0
Citizens for Blank Votes (CenB)	4,222	0.17	New	0	±0
United for Valencia (UxV)	3,637	0.15	+0.04	0	±0
Communist Party of the Peoples of Spain (PCPE)	3,456	0.14	−0.03	0	±0
Humanist Party (PH)	2,566	0.10	+0.02	0	±0
Renewal Liberal Centre (CLR)	2,463	0.10	+0.04	0	±0
National Democracy (DN)	2,151	0.09	+0.06	0	±0
Communist Unification of Spain (UCE)	1,719	0.07	New	0	±0
Authentic Phalanx (FA)	1,627	0.07	−0.03	0	±0
Movement for People's Unity–Republicans (MUP–R)	1,440	0.06	±0.00	0	±0
Family and Life Party (PFyV)	1,412	0.06	New	0	±0
Spanish Phalanx of the CNSO (FE–JONS)	1,156	0.05	+0.01	0	±0
The Republic (La República)	735	0.03	New	0	±0
Valencian Nationalist Left–European Valencianist Party (ENV–RV–PVE)	677	0.03	New	0	±0
Spanish Patriotic Social Party (SPES)	585	0.02	New	0	±0
Foreigners' Party (PdEx)	508	0.02	New	0	±0
Blank ballots	60,670	2.48	+1.07		
Total	2,450,872			99	±0
Valid votes	2,450,872	98.37	−0.96		
Invalid votes	40,716	1.63	+0.96		
Votes cast / turnout	2,491,588	70.19	+0.05		
Abstentions	1,058,099	29.81	−0.05		
Registered voters	3,549,687				
Sources
Footnotes: ^{1} Within the Commitment for the Valencian Country alliance in the 2007 election.

Popular vote
PP	49.42%
PSPV–PSOE	28.04%
Compromís	7.19%
EUPV	5.90%
UPyD	2.48%
VyE	1.30%
Others	3.20%
Blank ballots	2.48%

Seats
PP	55.56%
PSPV–PSOE	33.33%
Compromís	6.06%
EUPV	5.05%

=== Distribution by constituency ===
Constituency	PP		PSPV		Compr.		EUPV	
Constituency	%	S	%	S	%	S	%	S
Alicante	49.6	20	29.9	12	4.6	1	5.4	2
Castellón	48.1	13	31.0	9	6.7	1	5.2	1
Valencia	49.6	22	26.3	12	8.9	4	6.4	2
Total	49.4	55	28.0	33	7.2	6	5.9	5

== Aftermath ==
=== Government formation ===
Investiture; Nomination of Francisco Camps (PP)
Ballot →	16 June 2011
Required majority →	50 out of 99
Yes: • PP (55)	55 / 99
No: • PSPV (32); • Compromís (6); • EUPV (5)	43 / 99
Abstentions	0 / 99
Absentees: • PSPV (1)	1 / 99

=== July 2011 investiture ===
Investiture; Nomination of Alberto Fabra (PP)
Ballot →	26 July 2011
Required majority →	50 out of 99
Yes: • PP (55)	55 / 99
No: • PSPV (32); • Compromís (6); • EUPV (5)	43 / 99
Abstentions	0 / 99
Absentees: • PSPV (1)	1 / 99

== Bibliography ==
- Ley 5/1983, de 30 de diciembre, del Consell (Law 5/1983). Official State Gazette (in Spanish). 30 December 1983 [version as of 23 March 2007]. BOE-A-1984-3460.
- Ley Orgánica 5/1985, de 19 de junio, del Régimen Electoral General (Organic Law 5/1985). Official State Gazette (in Spanish). 19 June 1985 [version as of 30 April 2011]. BOE-A-1985-11672.
- Ley 1/1987, de 31 de marzo, Electoral Valenciana (Law 1/1987). Official State Gazette (in Spanish). 31 March 1987 [version as of 6 April 1987]. BOE-A-1987-9636.
- Ley Orgánica 1/2006, de 10 de abril, de Reforma de la Ley Orgánica 5/1982, de 1 de julio, de Estatuto de Autonomía de la Comunidad Valenciana (Organic Law 1/2006). Official State Gazette (in Spanish). 10 April 2006 [version as of 17 July 2010]. BOE-A-1982-17235.
- Decreto 2/2011, de 28 de marzo, del president de la Generalitat, de disolución de Les Corts y de convocatoria de elecciones a las mismas (PDF) (Decree 2/2011). Official Journal of the Valencian Government (in Spanish). 28 March 2011.
