= Lola Botella =

Spanish politician (1945–2023)

María Dolores "Lola" Botella Arbona (20 July 1945 – 31 August 2023) was a Spanish People's Party (PP) politician. She was the mayor of Carcaixent in the Valencian Community from 1999 to 2015, and a deputy in the Corts Valencianes from 2007 to 2011 and from 2014 to 2015.

== Biography ==
Botella served four terms as mayor, having the longest tenure in the city's history. Her tenure coincided with the Spanish property bubble, during which there were many new buildings in the city. In 2015 she chose not to run again, giving her place at the top of the list to the leader of the local PP, Salvador Ferrer.

Botella was elected to the Corts Valencianes in the 2007 Valencian regional election, running 14th on the PP list in the Valencia constituency. She was listed 33rd in 2011 and was not elected, but returned to her seat in the legislature in July 2014 after 19 names ahead of her had resigned, the last being that of Serafín Castellano.

In February 2013, Botella was charged with alleged misappropriation of public funds. The investigation was part of the Gürtel case.

Botella died at age 78, after a long illness.
