= Joan Pla =

Joan Pla may refer to:

- Joan Baptista Pla, Spanish composer and oboist
- Joan Ignasi Pla, Spanish politician
