= Enrique Verdeguer Puig =

Spanish state economist

Enrique Verdeguer Puig (born Feb. 2nd 1964) is a Spanish state economist, commercial technician, developer, and politician.

== Biography ==
He was born in the city of Valencia in the year 1964.

He holds a degree in economics from the University of Valencia and also has a master's degree in Economic Development from the University of Oxford.

After completing his higher studies, he became a technician in the Superior Body of Commercial and State Economists, in which he has held various positions of responsibility over the years.

He was deputy director of Foreign Sector Studies at the Ministry of Economy, Director of the Center for Economic and Commercial Studies (CECO) Foundation, Economic Counselor at the Embassy of Spain in Rabat, Morocco, and finally Director General of Information and Investments at the Spanish Institute for Foreign Trade (ICEX).

He became affiliated with the People's Party of the Valencian Community in 2011, when regional president Francisco Camps entrusted him with the task of leading the newly remodeled Department of Economy, Industry, and Commerce of the Valencian Government, where he was in charge of promoting industrial and economic policies and also became an important political figure within the Valencian government.

Subsequently, in January 2012, the Council of Ministers of Spain appointed him as the new President of the Administrator of Railway Infrastructure (better known as ADIF), which led to the next President of the Valencian Government appointing politician Máximo Buch Torralva as his successor in the department.

Since January 21, 2014, he has been the Director of the Campus of the ESADE Business School in Madrid, with the aim of promoting the presence and activity of the business school in support of Spanish multinational companies in their internationalization process. He currently serves as the Coordinator of Economy for the Permanent Representation of Spain to the European Union in Brussels.
