= Commitment for the Valencian Country =

Commitment for the Valencian Country Compromís pel País Valencià
- Leader: Glòria Marcos; Enric Morera
- Founded: 29 November 2006
- Dissolved: 12 November 2008
- Merger of: EUPV; Bloc; EVPV; EV–EE; IR
- Ideology: Valencian nationalism Eco-socialism; Green politics

Website
- www.compromispelpaisvalencia.org

Commitment for the Valencian Country (Valencian: Compromís pel País Valencià, Compromís PV or CPV) was a Valencian political coalition formed for the 2007 Valencian regional election by United Left of the Valencian Country (EUPV), Valencian Nationalist Bloc (Bloc), The Greens of the Valencian Country (EVPV), The Greens–Ecologist Left of the Valencian Country (EV–EE) and Republican Left (IR). After the coalition's failure to fulfill expectations, it was not renewed for the 2008 Spanish general election, where Valencian People's Initiative (IdPV), a split-off from EUPV, chose to run together with the Bloc and EV–EE in opposition to the United and Republican Left alliance (formed by EUPV and IR).

CPV eventually disbanded in November 2008 after EUPV MPs split from their parliamentary group in the Corts Valencianes. The Bloc, IdPV and EV–EE would strengthen their alliance and form Coalició Compromís (English: Commitment Coalition) in 2010.

== History ==
Talks had been ongoing throughout 2006 between EUPV and the Bloc after the unsuccessful attempt of the L'Entesa alliance in 2003 and 2004. On 29 November 2006, EUPV, the Bloc and EVPV reached a coalition agreement to run together in the incoming Valencian regional election under the EU–Bloc–Verds. Compromís pel País Valencià name (English: EU–Bloc–Greens. Commitment for the Valencian Country). By January 2007, the coalition was extended to include EV–EE and IR. The alliance did not materialize for the simultaneous 2007 Spanish local elections, with EUPV forming a global alliance only with EVPV and IR, whereas coalitions with the Bloc were limited to around 20 municipalities.

The coalition obtained 195,116 votes (8% of the share) in the regional election, which was seen as a failure as it was significantly less than expected, as both EUPV and the Bloc had garnered 268,505 votes (11% of the share) in 2003, when they ran separately. This result translated to 7 seats in the Corts Valencianes, only one more than those obtained by L'Entesa. The electoral result sparked a crisis within the alliance, which translated into its parliamentary group in the Corts. Mònica Oltra and other EUPV members eventually split to establish Valencian People's Initiative (IdPV) as a political party.

On 12 November 2008, EUPV MPs left the Compromís parliamentary group following Glòria Marcos's expulsion from the group, after months of continuous clashes and disagreements between EUPV, on the one hand, and the Bloc and IdPV, on the other. The remaining parties within the Compromís group eventually joined into the Coalició Compromís alliance.

== Composition ==
Party
United Left of the Valencian Country (EUPV)
Valencian Nationalist Bloc (Bloc)
The Greens of the Valencian Country (EVPV)
The Greens–Ecologist Left of the Valencian Country (EV–EE)
Republican Left (IR)

== Electoral performance ==
=== Corts Valencianes ===
Corts Valencianes
Election	Vote	%	Seats	Status	Leader
2007	195,116 (#3)	8.02	7 / 99	Opposition	Glòria Marcos
