= Enric Morera =

Enric Morera may refer to:

- Enric Morera i Viura (1865–1942), Catalan musical composer
- Enric Morera i Català (born 1964), Valencian politician, leader of the Valencian Nationalist Bloc and Compromís
