= Green Left–Initiative for the Valencian Country =

Green Left–Initiative for the Valencian Country Esquerra Verda–Iniciativa pel País Valencià
- Leader: Joan Francesc Peris
- Founded: 26 May 2001
- Dissolved: 6 November 2004
- Split from: Democratic Party of the New Left
- Succeeded by: The Greens of the Valencian Country
- Ideology: Ecologism

Green Left–Initiative for the Valencian Country (Spanish: Esquerra Verda–Iniciativa pel País Valencià; EV–IPV) or just Green Left (Spanish: Esquerra Verda; EV) was a political party in the Valencian Community founded in May 2001 from the Nova Esquerra (English: "New Left", NE) faction within the Democratic Party of the New Left (PDNI). It was led by Valencian MP Joan Francesc Peris, previously a member from United Left of the Valencian Country (EUPV), who had been elected in the 1999 Valencian regional election in the PSOE–PDNI electoral alliance.

The party contested the 2003 Valencian regional and 2004 Spanish general elections in alliance with the Valencian Nationalist Bloc (Bloc), but failed to gain any seat. EV–IPV subsequently merged with The Greens branch in the Valencian Community (EV/LV) and Alternative Left of Buñol (IAB) to form The Greens of the Valencian Country (EVPV) in November 2004.
