= 2019 Spanish general election =

2019 Spanish general election may refer to one of two general elections held in Spain in 2019:

- April 2019 Spanish general election, to elect the 13th Cortes Generales
- November 2019 Spanish general election, to elect the 14th Cortes Generales
