= Socialist Party of the Valencian Country =

Socialist Party of the Valencian Country Partit Socialista del País Valencià
- President: Ciprià Ciscar
- Secretary-General: Diana Morant
- Founded: 1978
- Headquarters: C/ Blanqueries, 4 Valencia, Valencian Community, Spain
- Membership (2014): 17,230
- Ideology: Social democracy Federalism; Valencianism
- Political position: Centre-left
- National affiliation: Spanish Socialist Workers' Party
- Valencian Courts: 27 / 99
- Congress of Deputies: 10 / 32 (Valencian seats)
- Spanish Senate: 8 / 18 (Valencian seats)
- Provincial deputations: 28 / 89
- Local seats: 1,832 / 5,784

Website
- www.socialistesvalencians.org

The Socialist Party of the Valencian Country (Valencian: Partit Socialista del País Valencià. Spanish: Partido Socialista del País Valenciano, PSPV–PSOE) is a social-democratic political party in the Valencian Community, and is a regional branch of the national Spanish Socialist Workers' Party (PSOE).

The PSPV was originally a small nationalist and leftist Valencian party, mostly confined to the academic world within the University of Valencia. In 1978, they decided to merge with the much larger national PSOE, to which they integrated. Their name remains in the name of the Valencian branch of the PSOE, officially called PSPV-PSOE, even though it is usually reduced to PSOE only by the party itself. This Valencian branch of the PSOE, unlike its Catalan counterpart, does not have a record of having acted independently from the national executive of the Spanish-wide PSOE.

== History ==
The PSPV-PSOE was the ruling party in the Valencian Country from 1983 through 1995. The People's Party (PP) won the elections since 1995 until 2015, when the PSPV-PSOE won the elections and ended the 20-year tenure of the PP. The PSPV-PSOE remains the main opposition party of the PP from 1995 to date.

In their general meeting held in September 2008, the party was scheduled to officially drop the PSPV line in their name and change it to PSCV to adjust it to the official name of the territory (Comunitat Valenciana, CV) but, eventually, this proposal was discarded and the name was not changed. However, talk of a name change for the party keeps lingering on, as its new leader is said to support a different name in order to be in synch with the current Valencian situation. (for further information, see Names of the Valencian Community)

== Electoral performance ==
=== Corts Valencianes ===
Corts Valencianes
Election	Votes	%	#	Seats	+/–	Leading candidate	Status in legislature
1983	982,567	51.41%	1st	51 / 89	—	Joan Lerma	Government
1987	828,961	41.28%	1st	42 / 89	9	Joan Lerma	Government
1991	860,429	42.85%	1st	45 / 89	3	Joan Lerma	Government
1995	804,463	33.98%	2nd	32 / 89	13	Joan Lerma	Opposition
1999	768,548	33.91%	2nd	35 / 89	3	Antoni Asunción	Opposition
2003	874,288	35.96%	2nd	35 / 89	0	Joan Ignasi Pla	Opposition
2007	838,987	34.49%	2nd	38 / 99	3	Joan Ignasi Pla	Opposition
2011	687,141	28.04%	2nd	33 / 99	5	Jorge Alarte	Opposition
2015	509,098	20.57%	2nd	23 / 99	10	Ximo Puig	Coalition
2019	643,909	24.21%	1st	27 / 99	4	Ximo Puig	Coalition
2023	691,715	28.70%	2nd	31 / 99	4	Ximo Puig	Opposition

=== Cortes Generales ===
Cortes Generales
Election	Valencian Community						
Election	Congress					Senate	
Election	Votes	%	#	Seats	+/–	Seats	+/–
1977	678,429	36.33%	1st	13 / 29	—	8 / 12	—
1979	698,677	37.31%	1st	13 / 29	0	6 / 12	2
1982	1,118,354	53.11%	1st	19 / 29	6	9 / 12	3
1986	993,439	47.49%	1st	18 / 31	1	9 / 12	0
1989	878,377	41.46%	1st	16 / 31	2	9 / 12	0
1993	935,325	38.35%	2nd	12 / 31	4	4 / 12	5
1996	990,993	38.32%	2nd	13 / 32	1	3 / 12	1
2000	826,595	34.00%	2nd	12 / 32	1	3 / 12	0
2004	1,127,700	42.45%	2nd	14 / 32	2	3 / 12	0
2008	1,124,414	40.97%	2nd	14 / 33	0	3 / 12	0
2011	697,474	26.75%	2nd	10 / 33	4	3 / 12	0
2015	531,489	19.83%	3rd	7 / 32	3	2 / 12	1
2016	539,278	20.79%	3rd	6 / 33	1	0 / 12	2
2019 (Apr)	746,486	27.78%	1st	10 / 32	4	9 / 12	9
2019 (Nov)	700,159	27.60%	1st	10 / 32	0	6 / 12	3

=== European Parliament ===
European Parliament
Election	Valencian Community		
Election	Votes	%	#
1987	845,517	42.08%	1st
1989	732,602	42.67%	1st
1994	608,897	30.49%	2nd
1999	807,299	35.61%	2nd
2004	737,669	42.21%	2nd
2009	708,244	37.59%	2nd
2014	379,541	21.56%	2nd
2019	763,120	32.97%	1st
