= Valencian Nationalist Bloc =

Valencian Nationalist Bloc Bloc Nacionalista Valencià
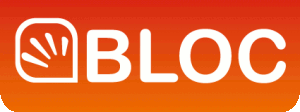
- Leader: Enric Morera
- Founded: 1998
- Dissolved: 27 June 2021
- Merger of: Valencian People's Union; Valencian Nationalist Party; Nationalists of Alcoi
- Succeeded by: Més–Compromís
- Headquarters: Sant Jacint 28, 46006 Valencia
- Ideology: Valencian nationalism Progressivism; Ecologism
- Political position: Left-wing
- Regional affiliation: Commitment for the Valencian Country (2006–2008); Coalició Compromís (since 2010)
- European affiliation: European Free Alliance
- European Parliament group: Greens–EFA
- Colours: Orange

Website
- bloc.compromis.net

The Valencian Nationalist Bloc (Valencian: Bloc Nacionalista Valencià, Bloc or BNV; IPA: [ˈblɔɡ nasionaˈlista valensiˈa]) was a Valencian nationalist party in the Valencian Country, Spain. It was the largest party in the Coalició Compromís until 2021, when it was replaced in a refoundation process by Més–Compromís.

== History ==
The Bloc was formed in 1998 as a result of the federation of several parties in a coalition formed for the 1995 regional elections. That group of parties was headed by Unitat del Poble Valencià (UPV, founded in 1982) which is the main predecessor of the current Bloc, together with other smaller parties, often locally based, such as the Valencian Nationalist Party (1990) or Alcoi Nationalists (1994).

The Bloc has historically defined itself as a left-wing party. This position shifted to a centrist or center-left position in the late nineties, as part of a strategy to appeal to a broader audience known as tercera via (third way). This strategy proved unsuccessful, especially due to their failure to attract enough of the regionalist vote in the 2003 regional elections.

Then, for the 2007 Valencian regional elections to the Corts Valencianes, the Valencian regional parliament, the Bloc returned to a more left wing agenda as it ran in coalition with EUPV, the Valencian branch of Izquierda Unida, a coalition whose main member is the Communist Party (PCE). This coalition operated under the name of Compromís pel País Valencià. Compromís' results (seven seats) did not achieve their goal of growing and forming a front alongside the Spanish Socialist Workers' Party (PSOE) to oust the Partido Popular from the regional government. Still, they allowed Bloc to enter the autonomous Parliament (two seats) and secured EUPV representation as well (the remaining five seats).

However, a schism occurred soon after within the EUPV between the two more nationalist and social democratic MPs on the one side and the more communist and less nationalist remaining three members on the other. The former MPs were finally expelled from EUPV and went on to create a new party Iniciativa del Poble Valencià (Valencian People Initiative). In turn, they allied themselves with the Bloc, thus effectively gaining a majority for the nationalists in the coalition, while creating a climate of frigid relations between EUPV and Bloc for the remainder of the term, making the renewal of the pact for future polls unlikely in the short term.

For the 2008 General election the Bloc ran in coalition with other left wing, regional and green parties, such as Iniciativa del Poble Valencià. However, despite the fact that the list was headed by a sitting deputy, Isaura Navarro, their vote fell relative to 2004.

For the 2011 Valencian Regional elections, they stood in an electoral alliance with Iniciativa del Poble Valencià and other Green parties in a new coalition called Coalició Compromís. This coalition won a record of six seats in the Valencian parliament, and also won the first seat in history for a Valencian Nationalist force in the Spanish national parliament at the 2011 Spanish General Election.

== Representation ==
Unitat del Poble Valencià logo.

The Bloc only runs elections held in the Valencian Community. Including its Unitat del Poble Valencià former era, until 2011 it had historically polled at around 4% of the votes in elections for the Valencian regional parliament, with significantly lower figures when running at Spanish general elections in Valencia.

Since 2011, it has been represented by Coalició Compromís, and became the third political force in the Land of Valencia, with 3 of 6 seats of Coalició Compromís in the Valencian parliament, about 385 seats in municipal councils and one seat in the Spanish parliament.

=== Coalitions ===
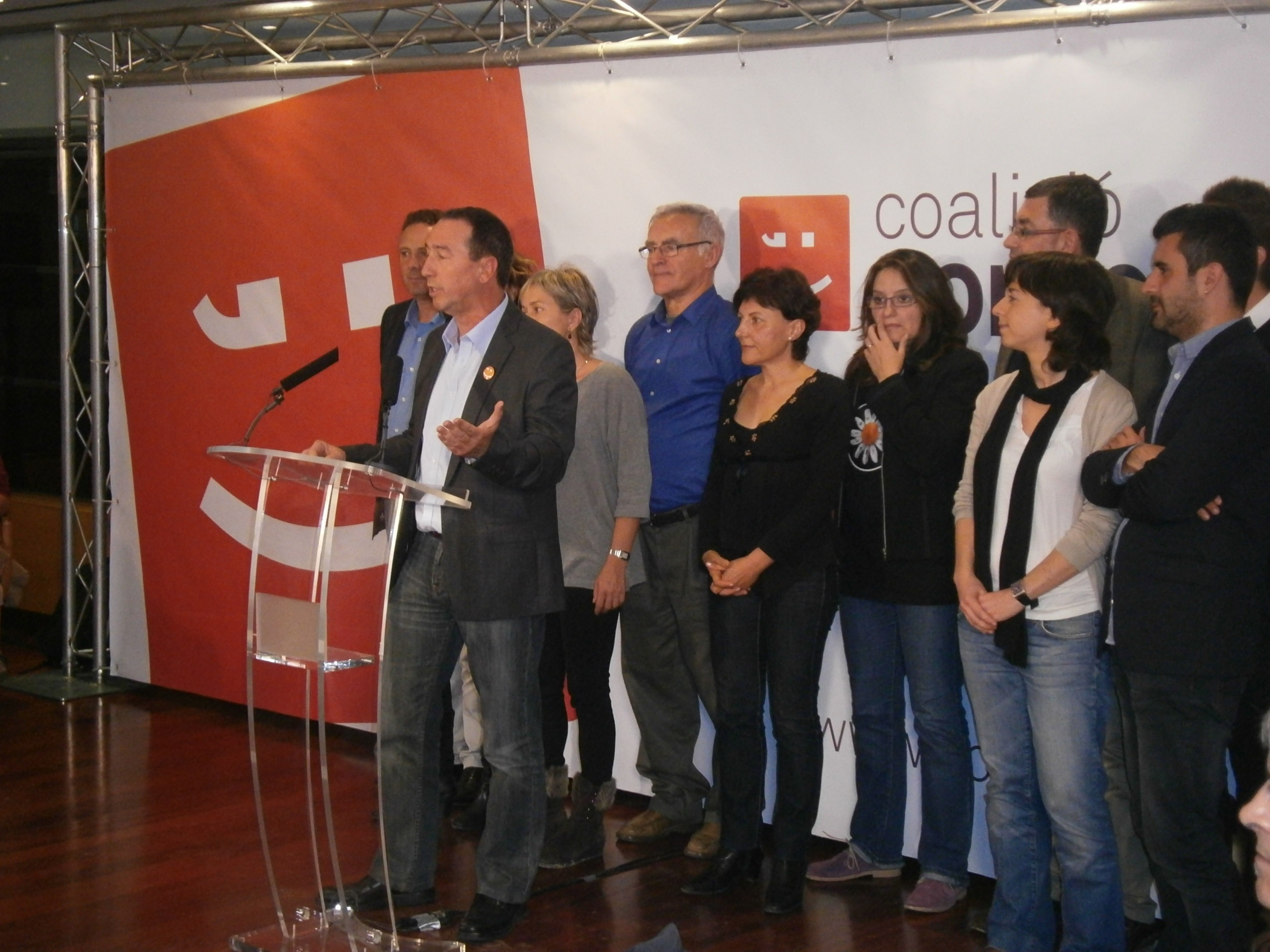
The people of Compromís, with Joan Baldoví in front, celebrating their first MP in the 2011 Spanish general election.

Bloc has been represented at the Valencian parliament three times, twice by means of a coalition with the Valencian branch of United Left.

Their first participation in this coalition was in 1987, under Bloc's "Unitat del Poble Valencià" (UPV) former name. According to the coalition pact, UPV was allotted two out of the six MPs. Internal tensions within the coalition and, especially, within the UPV, led to its disbanding. These events were the start of the process which led to the demise of UPV and its refoundation as BLOC.

Still, both parties (under new names, Bloc for UPV and Esquerra Unida del País Valencià, EUPV, for United Left) agreed to repeat their coalition for the 2007 regional elections, in order to secure if only joint representation, something which was at stake if they participated by themselves. This renewed coalition, called Compromís pel País Valencià, indeed achieved representation with seven MPs, two of which corresponded to Bloc according to the coalition pact rules. Internal dissent plagued again the coalition, this time predating especially on its EUPV component, which has split since.

In 2011, the BLOC created a coalition Coalició Compromís, running alongside Iniciativa del Poble Valencià (a scission of United Left) and the Green, both partners in the previous coalition. Coalició Compromís got 6 seats in the Valencian Parlement in the 2011 elections, consolidating itself as the third political force in the Land of Valencia.

=== At municipalities ===
Support for the Bloc is higher at the local level, with 384 councillors and about 20 mayors. Thus, it is the distant third major Valencian political party at the municipal level, far from the major parties, PP and PSPV-PSOE. The party is nearly absent in a number of areas in the Valencian Community (virtually all of those comarcas which are Spanish speaking only) while it is a major political agent in others, namely in its historic stronghold at the contiguous area formed by the northernmost part of Alicante province and the southernmost part of Valencia province.

== International representation ==
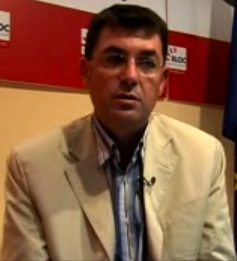
Enric Morera, 2008.

For the 1999 European Parliament election the Bloc allied with the Catalonia-based Convergence and Union and the Majorca Socialist Party with Bloc leader Enric Morera fifth on the list. The coalition won two seats, however Morera briefly became a Euro MP in April 2004

The Bloc joined the Galeusca coalition in the 2004 European Parliament election, with other nationalist parties from the Spanish state such as the Basque Nationalist Party, the Catalan Convergence and Union, the Galician Nationalist Bloc, and the Socialist Party of Majorca. Galeusca got two seats, neither of them for the BNV.

== Electoral performance ==
=== Corts Valencianes ===
Date	Votes			Seats		Status	Size
Date	#	%	±pp	#	±	Status	Size
1999*	102,700	4.5%	+1.8	0 / 89	0	N/A	5th
2003	114,011	4.7%	+0.2	0 / 89	0	N/A	4th
2007	195,116	8.0%	N/A	2 / 99	2	Opposition	**
2011	176,213	7.2%	+4.9	3 / 99	1	Opposition	***
2015	456,823	18.5%	+11.3	10 / 99	7	Government	***
2019	443 640	16.44%	-2.9	11 / 99	1	Government	***

- * In coalition with The Greens.
- ** Within Commitment for the Valencian Country.
- *** Within Compromís. (As Més-Compromís)

=== Cortes Generales ===
==== Valencian Community ====
Congress of Deputies
Date	Votes			Seats		Status	Size
Date	#	%	±pp	#	±	Status	Size
2000 *	58,551	2.4%	N/A	0 / 32	0	N/A	4th
2004	40,759	1.5%	–0.9	0 / 32	0	N/A	4th
2008 **	29,760	1.1%	–0.4	0 / 33	0	N/A	4th
2011 ***	125,306	4.8%	N/A	1 / 33	1	Opposition	5th
2015 ****	673,549	25.1%	N/A	2 / 32	1	Opposition	2nd
2016 *****	659,771	25.4%	N/A	2 / 33	0	Opposition	2nd
2019 April *****	173,821	6.47%	N/A	1 / 33	0	Opposition	6th
2019 November ******	176,287	6.95%	+0.5	1 / 33	0	Opposition	6th

Senate
Date	Seats		Size
Date	#	±	Size
2000*	0 / 12	0	5th
2004	0 / 12	0	4th
2008**	0 / 12	0	3rd
2011	0 / 12	0	***
2015	0 / 12	0	****
2016	1 / 12	1	*****
2019 April	0 / 12	1	******
2019 November	0 / 12	0	******

- * In coalition with The Greens–Valencians for Change.
- ** In coalition with Initiative and Greens
- *** Within Compromís-Equo.
- **** Within És el moment.
- ***** Within A la valenciana.
- ****** Within Compromís 2019

=== European Parliament ===
Spain
Date	Votes			Seats		Size
Date	#	%	±pp	#	±	Size
1999 (a)	937,687	4.4%	N/A	0 / 64	0	4th
2004 (b)	798,816	5.2%	N/A	0 / 54	0	3rd
2009 (c)	808,246	5.1%	N/A	0 / 54	0	3rd
2014 (d)	302,266	1.9%	N/A	1 / 54	1	10th
2019 (e)	296,491	1.32%	N/A	0 / 54	0	9th

Valencian Community
Date	Votes			Size
Date	#	%	±pp	Size
1999 (a)	54,589	2.4%	+0.6	5th
2004 (b)	19,627	1.1%	–1.3	4th
2009 (c)	18,458	1.0%	–0.1	5th
2014 (d)	139,863	8.0%	+7.0	6th
2019 (e)	193,506	8.36%	+0.36	5th

- (a) Within Convergence and Union.
- (b) Within Galeusca–Peoples of Europe.
- (c) Within Coalition for Europe.
- (d) Within European Spring.
- (e) Within CpE.
