= Monic Cecconi-Botella =

French pianist, music educator and composer (1936–2025)

Monic Gabrielle Cecconi-Botella (30 September 1936 – 28 December 2025) was a French pianist, music educator and composer.

== Life and career ==
Cecconi-Botella was born in Courbevoie on 30 September 1936. She studied at the Conservatoire de Paris with Maurice Duruflé, Jean Rivier and Henri Dutilleux. After completing her studies, she worked as a professor of music theory at the Conservatoire of Aubervilliers. In 1983, she became a professor of music analysis at the Conservatoire de Paris.

In 1966, Cecconi-Botella won a First at the Prix de Rome. Her opera Noctuaile won a Grand Prix du Disque. In 2008, she founded the Festival Seasons of the Voice in Gordes, Provence.

Cecconi-Botella died on 28 December 2025, at the age of 89.

== Works ==
Cecconi-Botella explored multi-media arts in her compositions. Selected works include:

- Bucolique for flute and piano
- Cérémonie for viola and piano
- Noctuaile opera in two parts, libretto by René David
- He Signed Vincent (about the life of Vincent van Gogh)
- The Woman of the Ogre, opera, book by Pierrette Fleutiaux
- Operaclown, children's opera, libretto by René Pillot
- Pirlipipi, children's opera, libretto by Pierre Gripari
- Triangle Crystal, children's opera, book by Françoise Arquetout
