= United and Republican Left =

United and Republican Left Esquerra Unida i Republicana
- Leader: Antonio Montalbán
- Founded: 2008; 18 years ago
- Dissolved: 2008; 18 years ago
- Merger of: EUPV; IR
- Ideology: Socialism; Communism; Republicanism
- Political position: Left-wing

United and Republican Left (Valencian: Esquerra Unida i Republicana) was a Valencian electoral alliance formed by United Left of the Valencian Country (EUPV) and Republican Left (IR) to contest the 2008 Spanish general election in the Valencian Community. The list was led by Antonio Montalbán.

== Composition ==
Party
| United Left of the Valencian Country (EUPV) |
| Republican Left (IR) |
