= United Left of the Valencian Country =

United Left of the Valencian Country Esquerra Unida del País Valencià
- Spokesperson: Ignacio Blanco Giner
- General Coordinator: Marga Sanz
- Founded: 1986
- Merger of: Communist Party of the Valencian Country; Izquierda Abierta; Republican Left; Communist Youth of the Valencian Country; Open Space; Independents
- Membership (2014): 3,264
- Ideology: Socialism; Communism; Valencianism; Catalanism; Republicanism
- Political position: Left-wing to far-left
- National affiliation: United Left
- Regional affiliation: Valencian Front (since 2026) (Note: The party was formerly part of Esquerra Unida–L'Entesa (2003–2007), Commitment for the Valencian Country (2006–2008), United and Republican Left (2008), Acord Ciutadà (2015), A la valenciana (2016) and Sumem per Guanyar (2023–2026))
- Congreso de los Diputados: 1 / 33 Inside Unidas Podemos
- Corts Valencianes: 0 / 99 Inside Unidas Podemos
- Provincial deputations: 1 / 87
- Mayors: 11 / 542
- Local government (Note: Excluding coalitions.): 114 / 5,716

Website
- www.eupv.org

United Left of the Valencian Country (Catalan: Esquerra Unida del País Valencià) is the Valencian federation of the Spanish left wing political and social movement United Left. Marga Sanz is the current General Coordinator and Ignacio Blanco Giner its spokesperson.

The Communist Party of the Valencian Country (PCPV, Valencian federation of PCE) is the major member of the coalition.

== Election results ==
Election	Votes province Alicante	%	Seats	Votes province Castellón/Castelló	%	Seats	Votes provincia València	%	Seats	Votes total Valencian Community	%	Seats
1977	50.444	9,2	1	14.029	5,9	-	106.133	9,8	1	170.606	9,15	2
1979	62.018	11,2	1	17.361	7,2	-	145.141	13,5	2	224.520	12,0	3
1982	26.531	4,1	-	8.280	3,2	-	63.026	5,31	-	97.837	4,7	-
1986	31.340	4,9	-	6.155	2,4	-	60.857	5,11	-	98.352	4,7	-
1989	59.491	9,0	1	14.004	5,5	-	118.706	9,94	1	192.201	9,12	2
1993	80.339	10,3	1	20.250	7,1	-	156.340	11,49	2	256.929	10,60	3
1996	88.772	10,7	1	23.003	7,7	-	174.807	12,18	2	286.582	11,17	3
2000	42.998	5,4	-	10.773	3,9	-	87.633	6,60	1	141.404	5,89	1
2004	34.774	4,0	-	10.322	3,4	-	78.515	5,48	1	123.611	4,72	1
2008	21.087	2,3	-	6.635	2,1	-	46.683	3,15	-	74.405	2,73	-
2011	57.503	6,48	-	15.641	5,28	-	96.237	6,77	1	169.381		1

=== Valencian elections ===
Election	Votes province Alicante	%	Seats	Votes province Castellón/Castelló	%	Seats	Votes provincia València	%	Seats	Votes total Valencian Community	%	Seats
1983	38.057	6,7	2	13.364	5,64	1	91.149	8,35	3	142.570	7,51	6
1987	41.729	6,86	2	13.800	5,6	1	104.050	9,19	3	159.579	8,03	6
1991	45.458	7,34	2	11.964	4,85	1	93.820	8,37	3	151.242	7,61	6
1995	82.379	11,06	3	22.982	8,29	2	167.669	12,69	5	273.030	11,66	10
1999	44.583	6,17	2	11.186	4,25	1	81.443	6,54	2	137.212	6,15	5
2003	46.831	6,0	2	12.707	4,47	1	94.956	7,14	3	154.494	6,45	6
2007	54.261	6,87	2	22.205	7,89	2	118.650	8,94	3	195.116	8,14	7
2011	43.881	5,52	2	14.679	5,32	1	86.143	6,53	2	144.703	6,05	5
2015	35.142	4,29	-	9.202	3,11	-	61.703	4,49	-	106.047	4,26	-

== See also ==
- United Left (Spain)
