= Joan Ignasi Pla =

Spanish politician

Joan Ignasi Pla Durá (Atzeneta d'Albaida, Spain, 31 July 1959) is a Spanish politician who belongs to the Spanish Socialist Workers' Party (PSOE).

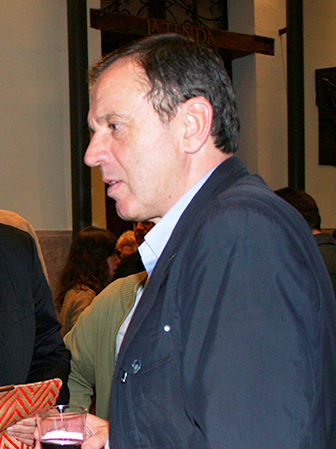
Joan Ignasi Pla (2015).

Married with one son, Pla graduated in law and also gained a diploma in public administration. He then worked in the Generalitat Valenciana, the Valencian regional administration, and later became secretary general of the Valencian regional branch of the PSOE. He became involved in national politics in 1996 when he was selected as part of the PSOE list for the national parliament as a candidate for Valencia province. Placed seventh on the list, in a district where the party had won six seats at the previous election, he was unsuccessful, as the party failed to gain any seats, however he joined the national parliament in 1999 as a substitute for a retiring member. He was re-elected in 2000 but stood down in June 2003, after being elected to the Corts Valencianes, the Valencian regional parliament.

In 2001 he successfully sought the PSOE nomination for President of the Generalitat Valenciana, defeating party rival Cipria Ciscar in the PSOE primaries, however in 2003, he lost the election to Francisco Camps of the Partido Popular. He also stood in 2007 for the Valencian Presidency, but again lost to Francisco Camps.
