= The Greens–Ecologist Left of the Valencian Country =

The Greens–Ecologist Left of the Valencian Country Els Verds–Esquerra Ecologista del País Valencià
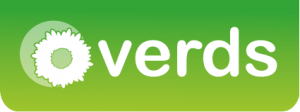
- Founded: 2004
- Dissolved: 2014
- Split from: The Greens
- Merged into: Greens Equo of the Valencian Country
- Ideology: Green politics Ecologism
- National affiliation: L'Entesa (2004–2007); Commitment for the Valencian Country (2007–2008); Compromís (2010–2014)

Website
- www.elsverdsesquerraecologista.org

The Greens–Ecologist Left of the Valencian Country (Spanish: Els Verds–Esquerra Ecologista del País Valencià; EV–EE) was a green political party in the Valencian Community founded in 2004 as a split from The Greens (EV/LV), in response to EV/LV's alliance with the Spanish Socialist Workers' Party (PSOE) for both the 2004 Spanish general and European Parliament elections.

In 2014 it joined with Equo's regional branch to form Greens Equo of the Valencian Country.
