= Francisco Camps =

Spanish politician (born 1962)

The Right Honourable Francisco Camps
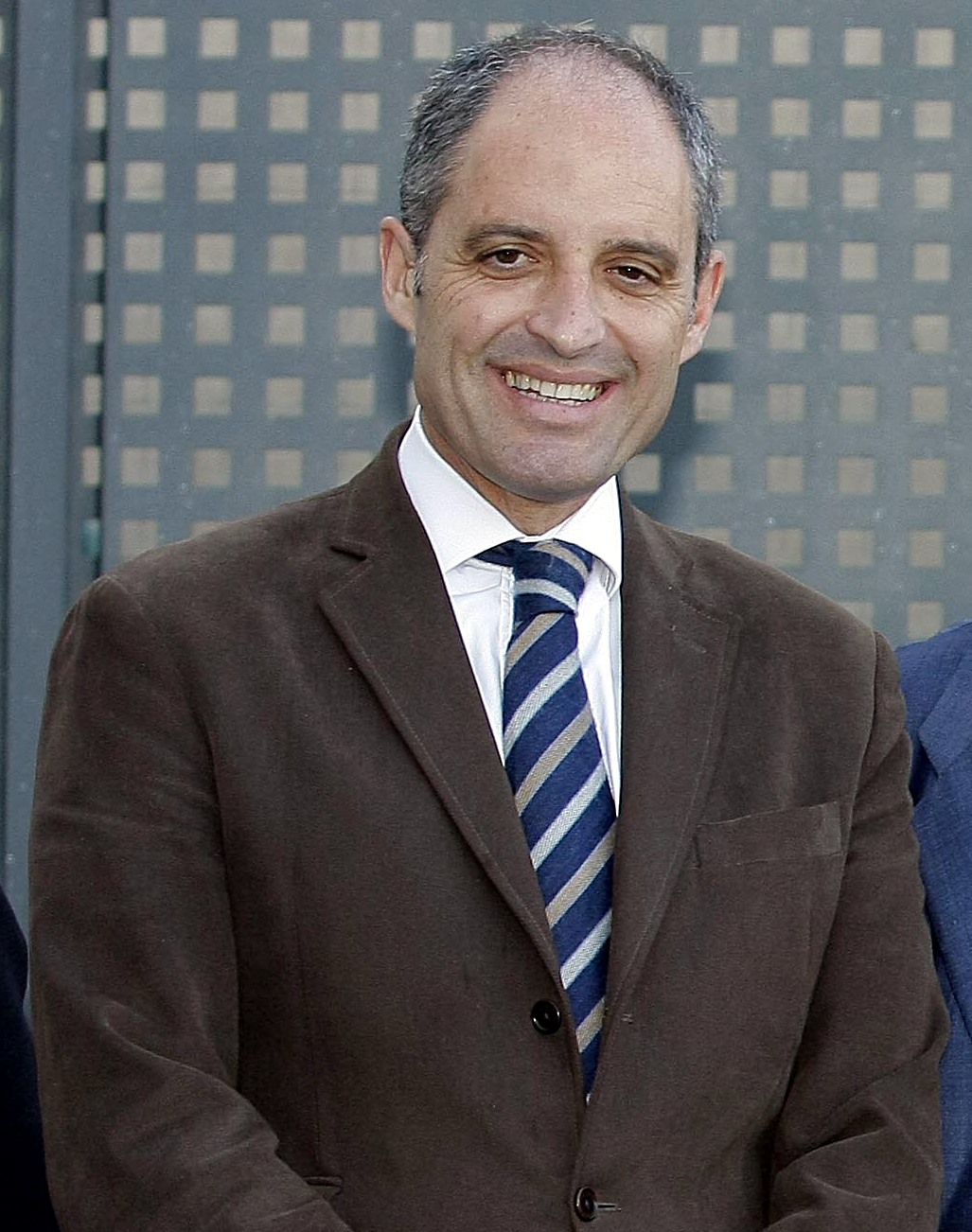

President of the Valencian Government
- In office 27 June 2003 – 28 July 2011
- Monarch: Juan Carlos I
- Preceded by: José Luis Olivas
- Succeeded by: Alberto Fabra

Personal details
- Born: 28 August 1962 (age 64) Valencia, Spain
- Party: PPCV
- Spouse: Isabel Bas
- Children: 3
- Education: University of Valencia

Francisco Enrique Camps Ortiz (born 28 August 1962) is a Spanish politician belonging to the Partido Popular (PP). He served as President of the Valencian Government, the Valencian regional administration, in the period 2003–2011, and is still a member of the Corts Valencianes, the Valencian regional parliament.

== Biography ==
A lawyer, Mr Camps is married with three children. He was first elected as a local councillor to Valencia city council, serving from 1991 to 1996, occupying the Presidency of the municipal transport body during that period. In 1996 he was elected to the Spanish Congress, representing Valencia province serving as Secretary of State for Territorial Administrations. However he resigned from the Congress 11 months later in February 1997, after being named as Minister for Culture and Education in the Generalitat Valenciana, retaining that post until January 1999. At the 2000 General Election, he returned to the Spanish Congress but again resigned in 2002 in order to run for President of the Valencian Government.

In July 2003 he was elected president, being re-elected with absolute majorities in 2007 and 2011. During his administration he attracted the European Grand Prix auto race and the America's Cup yacht race. He continued to serve as president until his resignation in 2011.

== Gürtel affair ==
In February 2009 Camps was implicated in a scandal known as the Gürtel affair (Caso Gürtel) relating to an alleged criminal network controlled by businessman Francisco Correa. ("Gürtel" is the German translation for the businessman's surname, Correa/belt).

In March 2009, Camps was one of several PP figures accused by magistrate Baltasar Garzón of taking bribes. Garzón alleged that Camps received €12,000 towards a tailor's bill from an associate of Correa. For two years Camps was to claim that he paid for the clothes himself. The case against Camps was transferred to a local court in Valencia which, in August 2009, ruled that Camps had not committed a crime. In May 2010 Camps' bribery case reopened as the High Court in Madrid ruled that there was enough evidence to bring a case against him. Camps was reelected as President of Valencia in May 2011, although the case threatened to undermine his political career. On 20 July 2011, Camps resigned as Valencian president and leader of the Valencian Partido Popular in order to avoid standing trial while in office. He continued to maintain his innocence although he said that he may have received presents.

On 25 January 2012 he was declared 'not guilty' by a popular jury.

Six years later, on 25 January 2018 Ricardo Costa, Mr. Camps's old colleague, admitted that the People's Party in the Valencian Community was financed with "dirty money". This acknowledgement was helpful for the inquiry into political financing using "Associations" in several provinces of the Valencian Country.

== Formula One case ==
Moreover, Francisco Camps is under investigation for the Formula One in Valencia.
