= Republican Left (Spain, 1977) =

Republican Left Izquierda Republicana
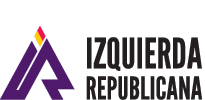
- Leader: Fran Pérez
- Founded: 1977
- Headquarters: C/ Silva, nº 5 - 4ª planta - 28013 (Madrid)
- Ideology: Republicanism; Iberian federalism Radicalism; Laicism
- Political position: Left-wing
- National affiliation: United Left (1986–2002, 2011–present)
- Colors: Red, Yellow and Murrey

Party flag

Website
- https://izqrepublicana.es/

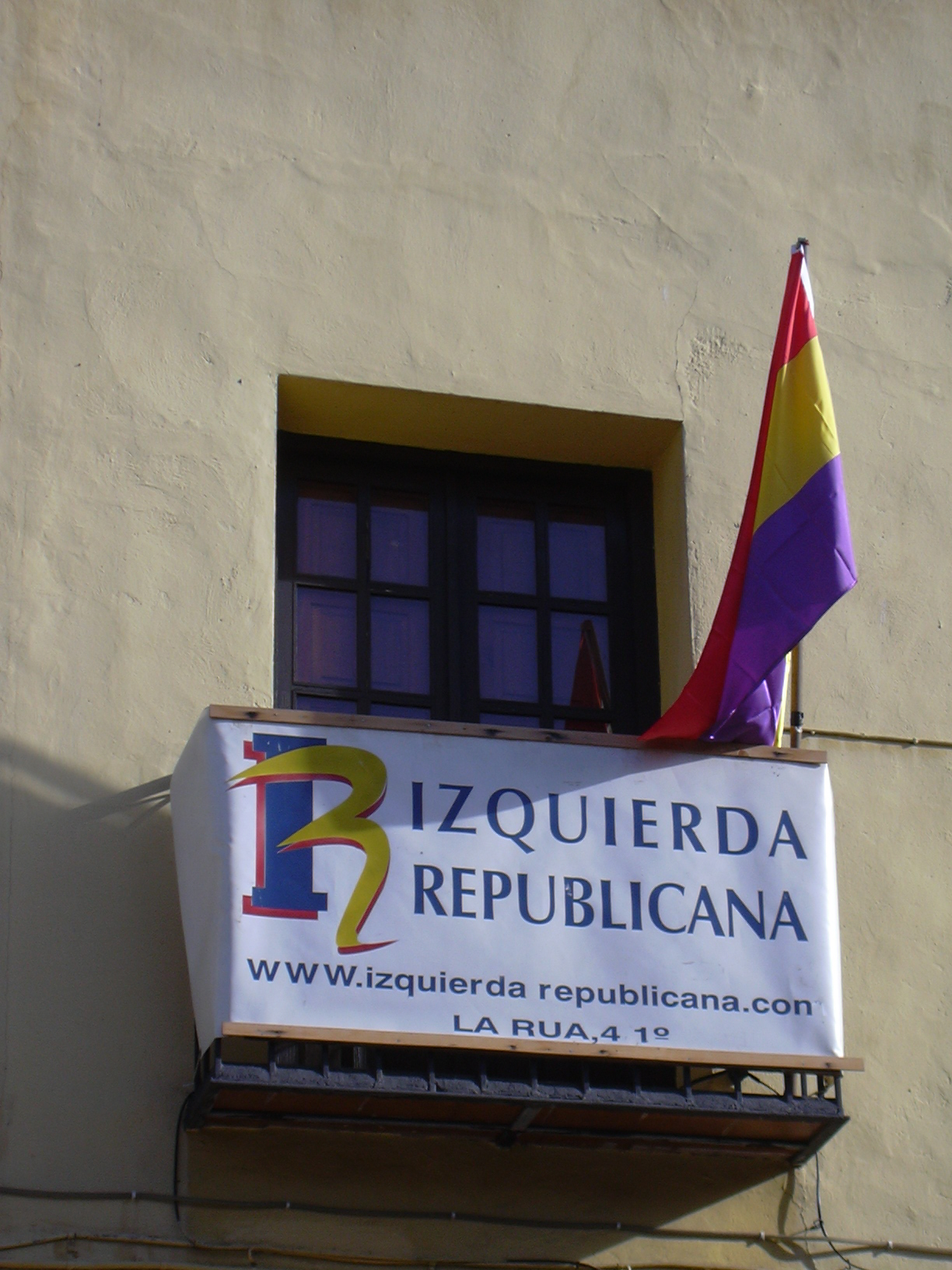
A branch of the party in León.

A distinct entity from Republican Left of Catalonia

The Republican Left (Spanish: Izquierda Republicana) is a Spanish republican political party. Founded in 1977, it considers itself as the heir to Manuel Azaña's Republican Left. Its contemporary presence is now limited to a handful of local councillors.

The party describes itself as a republican, federal, radical, secular, pacifist and environmentalist party. It maintains close links with the Nonviolent Radical Party.

Dictator Francisco Franco's death in 1975, allowed for the founding of new political parties. Republican Left was formed in 1977 and in April 1986, became a founding member of the United Left electoral alliance, which it broke away from in 2002. It participated in the 2004 election, winning 0.07% of the vote. It rejoined United Left in 2011.

== See also ==
- Liberalism and radicalism in Spain
- Republicanism in Spain
