= Opinion polling for the 2015 Spanish local elections (Valencian Community) =

In the run up to the 2015 Spanish local elections, various organisations carried out opinion polling to gauge voting intention in local entities in Spain. Results of such polls for municipalities in the Valencian Community are displayed in this article. The date range for these opinion polls is from the previous local elections, held on 22 May 2011, to the day the next elections were held, on 24 May 2015.

Polls are listed in reverse chronological order, showing the most recent first and using the dates when the survey fieldwork was done, as opposed to the date of publication. Where the fieldwork dates are unknown, the date of publication is given instead. The highest percentage figure in each polling survey is displayed with its background shaded in the leading party's colour. If a tie ensues, this is applied to the figures with the highest percentages. The "Lead" columns on the right shows the percentage-point difference between the parties with the highest percentages in a given poll.

== Municipalities ==
=== Alboraya ===
Polling firm/Commissioner	Fieldwork date	Sample size	Turnout	PP	PSPV	UPPA	Compromís	CIALBO	EUPV	ERPV	UPyD	Podemos/Podem	C's	Lead
2015 municipal election	24 May 2015	—N/a	73.1	19.1; 4	27.1; 7	(Note: Within C's.)	24.3; 6	–	5.6; 1	1.7; 0	5.0; 0	–	14.9; 3	2.8
GIPEyOP	28 Apr–14 May 2015	246	?	23.9; 5	17.0; 4		20.9; 5	–	7.7; 1	3.0; 0	6.5; 1	–	20.9; 5	3.0
GIPEyOP	19 Dec–19 Jan 2015	122	?	28.9; 7	15.0; 4	13.2; 3	9.7; 2	–	7.3; 2	–	–	13.8; 3	–	13.9
2011 municipal election	22 May 2011	—N/a	72.7	31.6; 8	18.1; 5	12.9; 3	11.6; 3	7.9; 2	4.6; 0	2.9; 0	2.2; 0	–	–	13.5

=== Alicante ===
Polling firm/Commissioner	Fieldwork date	Sample size	Turnout	PP	PSPV	EUPV	UPyD	Compromís	GA	C's	Lead
2015 municipal election	24 May 2015	—N/a	63.2	25.6; 8	20.3; 6	(Note: Within Guanyar Alacant.)	2.7; 0	9.0; 3	18.7; 6	18.7; 6	5.3
Sigma Dos/Mediaset	4–7 May 2015	?	?	28.8; 11	23.6; 9	? 1/2	–	7.4 ?	11.2 ?	19.4; 7	5.2
ODEC/PSPV	9–13 Mar 2015	597	?	27.9; 10	25.4; 9		3.2; 0	5.1; 1	14.8; 5	12.3; 4	2.5
PSPV	8 Dec 2014	?	?	? 13/14	? 9/10	? 0/1	? 1	? 0/1	? 3/5	–	?
Llorente & Cuenca	31 Oct 2014	?	?	? 11/12	? 6/7	? 2/3	? 1	? 1/2	? 4/5	–	?
PSPV	25 Feb 2013	?	?	? 11	? 8/9	? 3	? 5	? 0/1	–	–	?
2011 municipal election	22 May 2011	—N/a	61.9	52.1; 18	25.1; 8	7.6; 2	5.0; 1	3.7; 0	–	–	27.0

=== Benidorm ===
Polling firm/Commissioner	Fieldwork date	Sample size	Turnout	PSPV	PP	L	UPyD	LV	Compromís	EUPV	CBM	C's	Podemos/Podem	Lead
2015 municipal election	24 May 2015	—N/a	57.2	22.3; 7	27.2; 8	8.9; 2	2.8; 0	(Note: Within Compromís.)	7.0; 2	3.8; 0	12.0; 3	9.5; 3	–	4.9
Beninoticias	2 Feb 2015	?	?	? 6/7	? 8/9	? 0/1	? 1/2	? 0/1	? 0/1	? 0/1	? 4/5	–	? 1/2	?
Perfiles/Diario Información	12 Apr 2014	400	?	27.0– 28.0; 8/9	30.0– 31.0; 9/10	15.0– 16.0; 5	5.0– 6.0; 1	–	7.0– 8.0; 2	–	–	3.0– 4.0; 0	–	3.0
Accesi Consulting	12 Jan 2014	?	?	? 7/8	? 9/10	? 2/3	? 3	–	–	? 2/3	? 2/3	–	–	?
2011 municipal election	22 May 2011	—N/a	63.2	38.4; 11	37.8; 11	12.5 (Note: Results for CDL.); 3	1.8; 0	1.7; 0	0.9; 0	–	–	–	–	0.6

=== Benicàssim ===
Polling firm/Commissioner	Fieldwork date	Sample size	Turnout	PP	PSPV	AC	Compromís	ARB	C's	Lead
2015 municipal election	24 May 2015	—N/a	69.6	31.2; 6	15.2; 3	12.4; 2	16.9; 3	6.6; 1	13.2; 2	14.3
PP	25 Dec 2014	?	?	? 5	? 6	? 1	? 3	? 2	–	?
2011 municipal election	22 May 2011	—N/a	68.9	50.9; 9	26.8; 5	10.4 (Note: Results for EUPV.); 2	8.2 (Note: Results for Bloc.); 1	–	–	24.1

=== Carcaixent ===
Polling firm/Commissioner	Fieldwork date	Sample size	Turnout	PP	Compromís	PSPV	PSD	UxV	GdC	RC	Lead
2015 municipal election	24 May 2015	—N/a	73.5	17.5; 4	37.2; 10	10.4; 2	–	10.3; 2	8.4; 2	6.7; 1	19.7
Compromís	30 Mar 2014	256	?	? 5/6	? 10	? 2/3	? 1/2	? 1	–	–	?
2011 municipal election	22 May 2011	—N/a	75.4	43.9; 10	26.6; 6	13.1; 3	8.6; 1	5.9; 1	–	–	17.3

=== Castellón de la Plana ===
Polling firm/Commissioner	Fieldwork date	Sample size	Turnout	PP	PSPV	Compromís	L'EC	UPyD	CSenM	C's	Lead
2015 municipal election	24 May 2015	—N/a	66.5	26.0; 8	21.0; 6	13.9; 4	3.7; 0	1.8; 0	13.1; 4	15.0; 5	5.0
MyWord/Cadena SER	5–11 May 2015	400	?	27.1; 7/9	22.2; 6/7	12.5; 3/4	3.8; 0/1	1.2; 0	14.7; 4/5	15.0; 4/5	4.9
Sigma Dos/Mediaset	4–7 May 2015	?	?	33.1; 9	25.7; 6/7	9.1; 2	4.7; 0/1	–	10.3; 2/3	13.3; 3	7.4
Invest Group/Levante-EMV	22–30 Apr 2015	500	?	23.3; 6/7	25.1; 7/8	9.6; 2/3	7.6; 2	–	16.2; 4/5	15.0; 3/4	1.8
2011 municipal election	22 May 2011	—N/a	62.5	46.6; 15	26.6; 9	8.8; 2	5.7; 1	3.7; 0	–	–	20.0

=== Crevillent ===
Polling firm/Commissioner	Fieldwork date	Sample size	Turnout	PP	PSPV	Compromís	AC	UPyD	C's	SSPC	Lead
2015 municipal election	24 May 2015	—N/a	70.0	36.8; 9	13.2; 3	22.3; 5	9.2; 2	2.7; 0	9.4; 2	4.2; 0	14.5
Política Crevillent	4–7 Mar 2015	312	?	35.5; 8/9	15.2; 3	17.4; 4	16.4; 4	5.1; 0/1	5.9; 1	3.1; 0	18.1
Política Crevillent	14 Sep 2014	?	?	38.3; 9	18.4; 4	19.8; 5	15.7; 3	–	–	–	18.5
Política Crevillent	7 Aug 2014	?	?	39.2; 9	20.9; 5	17.3; 4	14.7; 3	–	–	–	18.3
2011 municipal election	22 May 2011	—N/a	72.0	57.1; 13	17.1; 3	12.9; 3	8.9; 2	–	–	–	40.0

=== Elche ===
Polling firm/Commissioner	Fieldwork date	Sample size	Turnout	PP	PSPV	PE	EUPV	Compromís	G	C's	I	Lead
2015 municipal election	24 May 2015	—N/a	66.5	29.6; 9	26.2; 8	5.8; 1	3.9; 0	13.8; 4	1.6; 0	9.6; 3	6.5; 2	3.4
PSPV	25 Nov–5 Dec 2014	800	?	? 9/10	? 10/11	? 1/2	? 1	? 1	? 1/2	–	–	?
2011 municipal election	22 May 2011	—N/a	68.5	43.8; 14	38.3; 12	5.3; 1	2.8; 0	2.8; 0	–	–	–	5.5

=== Elda ===
Polling firm/Commissioner	Fieldwork date	Sample size	Turnout	PP	PSPV	EUPV	UPyD	Compromís	C's	SSPE	Lead
2015 municipal election	24 May 2015	—N/a	66.6	24.0; 7	31.7; 9	7.6; 2	4.0; 0	8.2; 2	10.0; 3	10.0; 2	7.7
Pnyx	13 May 2014	?	?	? 10	? 9	? 3	? 2	? 1	–	–	?
2011 municipal election	22 May 2011	—N/a	66.0	49.0; 14	29.8; 8	7.8; 2	5.8; 1	3.1; 0	–	–	19.2

=== Gandia ===
Polling firm/Commissioner	Fieldwork date	Sample size	Turnout	PP	PSPV	Compromís	EUPV	UPyD	GG	PSdG	LVPV	C's	MG	Lead
2015 municipal election	24 May 2015	—N/a	72.4	39.0; 12	25.9; 7	(Note: Within MG.)		0.9; 0	2.3; 0	1.2; 0	2.2; 0	5.2; 1	17.4; 5	13.1
GIPEyOP	28 Apr–14 May 2015	350	?	28.7; 8	25.9; 8			3.6; 0	3.0; 0	5.3; 1	1.5; 0	6.1; 1	17.2; 5	2.8
Ceres/PP	21–27 Jan 2015	505	?	? 12/13	? 4/6	? 3/5	? 0/1	–	? 3/4	–	? 0/1	? 0/1	–	?
GIPEyOP	19 Dec–19 Jan 2015	354	?	32.4; 10	30.2; 10	14.2; 4	2.9; 0	5.6; 1	–	3.4; 0	–	–	–	2.2
Survio/Altres Veus	14 Jan 2015	335	?	? 9/10	? 6/7	? 3	? 0	? 2	? 4	–	–	–	–	?
2011 municipal election	22 May 2011	—N/a	74.3	44.6; 13	35.0; 10	9.1; 2	2.4; 0	0.7; 0	–	–	–	–	–	9.6

=== L'Eliana ===
Polling firm/Commissioner	Fieldwork date	Sample size	Turnout	PP	PSPV	EUPV	Compromís	UPyD	Podemos/Podem	C's	Lead
2015 municipal election	24 May 2015	—N/a	74.1	33.5; 6	37.0; 7	8.8; 1	10.3; 2	2.3; 0	–	6.9; 1	3.5
GIPEyOP	28 Apr–14 May 2015	381	?	39.7; 8	34.6; 6	11.0; 2	5.6; 1	4.2; 0	–	4.9; 0	5.1
GIPEyOP	19 Dec–19 Jan 2015	178	?	40.4; 8	24.4; 5	10.1; 2	5.2; 1	–	9.4; 1	–	16.0
2011 municipal election	22 May 2011	—N/a	73.7	44.4; 8	42.3; 8	5.8; 1	1.6; 0	–	–	–	2.1

=== La Vall d'Uixó ===
Polling firm/Commissioner	Fieldwork date	Sample size	Turnout	PP	PSPV	EUPV	Compromís	UPyD	C's	SLV	Lead
2015 municipal election	24 May 2015	—N/a	75.3	34.6; 8	26.3; 6	13.2; 3	9.2; 2	1.4; 0	6.3; 1	7.8; 1	8.3
Levante-EMV	30 Mar 2014	?	?	48.6; 10/11	29.1; 6/7	9.3; 2	4.3; 0/1	5.5; 1	–	–	19.5
2011 municipal election	22 May 2011	—N/a	71.8	49.2; 11	30.6; 7	12.9; 3	4.3; 0	–	–	–	18.6

=== Oropesa del Mar ===
Polling firm/Commissioner	Fieldwork date	Sample size	Turnout	PP	GIO	Compromís	PSPV	C's	SSPOM	Lead
2015 municipal election	24 May 2015	—N/a	63.0	40.8; 6		15.9; 2	16.7; 2	15.2; 2	10.2; 1	24.1
C's	22–27 Apr 2015	300	65	35.3; 4/5		12.7; 1/2	12.3; 1/2	32.0; 4/5	7.7; 0/1	3.3
2011 municipal election	22 May 2011	—N/a	60.8	48.1; 10	18.4; 3	14.0; 2	13.7; 2	–	–	29.7

=== Segorbe ===
Polling firm/Commissioner	Fieldwork date	Sample size	Turnout	PP	PSPV	ARDE	EUPV	Podemos/Podem	AESP	Lead
2015 municipal election	24 May 2015	—N/a	76.9	42.6; 6	34.3; 5	(Note: Within AESP.)	4.6; 0		16.5; 2	8.3
Soluciones Estratégicas/PP	Dec 2014	300	?	52.0; 8	18.1; 2/3	6.5; 0/1	7.7; 1	11.0; 1	–	33.9
2011 municipal election	22 May 2011	—N/a	77.3	56.5; 8	29.3; 4	8.8; 1	3.4; 0	–	–	27.2

=== Torrevieja ===
Polling firm/Commissioner	Fieldwork date	Sample size	Turnout	PP	PSPV	APTCe	LVPV	EUPV	C's	ST	Lead
2015 municipal election	24 May 2015	—N/a	50.6	37.9; 11	16.6; 4	6.4; 1	13.8; 4	6.4; 1	6.7; 2	7.8; 2	21.3
SyM Consulting	Oct 2014	?	?	? 12/13	? 9	? 3/4	? 0	? 2	–	–	?
2011 municipal election	22 May 2011	—N/a	53.9	47.5; 15	19.0; 6	14.4; 4	9.2; 2	4.8; 0	–	–	28.5

=== Vall d'Alba ===
Polling firm/Commissioner	Fieldwork date	Sample size	Turnout	PP	PSPV	Lead
2015 municipal election	24 May 2015	—N/a	75.4	57.2; 7	40.1; 4	17.1
PP	Mar 2015	400	?	67.6; 9	21.3; 2	46.3
2011 municipal election	22 May 2011	—N/a	79.1	71.8; 8	26.7; 3	45.1

=== Villarreal ===
Polling firm/Commissioner	Fieldwork date	Sample size	Turnout	PP	PSPV	Bloc	IxVR	EUPV	UPyD	Compromís	C's	Podemos/Podem	Lead
2015 municipal election	24 May 2015	—N/a	66.5	23.0; 6	43.9; 13			4.9; 0	1.1; 0	15.7; 4	7.5; 2	–	20.9
MyWord/Cadena SER	29 Apr–6 May 2015	300	?	32.8; 8/10	33.6; 8/10			0.8; 0	1.1; 0	14.5; 3/4	12.5; 3	–	0.8
PSPV	17 Jan 2015	750	?	32.4; 8/9	35.1; 10			5.0; 1	3.4; 0	13.9; 4/5	3.2; 0	7.0; 1/2	2.7
2011 municipal election	22 May 2011	—N/a	65.7	43.5; 12	29.3; 8	12.3; 3	6.2; 1	5.3; 1	–	–	–	–	14.2
