= 2019 Spanish local elections in the Valencian Community =

This article presents the results breakdown of the local elections held in the Valencian Community on 26 May 2019. The following tables show detailed results in the autonomous community's most populous municipalities, sorted alphabetically.

== City control ==
The following table lists party control in the most populous municipalities, including provincial capitals (shown in bold). Gains for a party are displayed with the cell's background shaded in that party's colour.

Municipality	Population	Previous control	New control
Alcoy	58,977	Socialist Party of the Valencian Country (PSPV–PSOE)	Socialist Party of the Valencian Country (PSPV–PSOE)
**Alicante**	331,577	People's Party (PP)	People's Party (PP)
Benidorm	67,558	People's Party (PP)	People's Party (PP)
**Castellón de la Plana**	170,888	Socialist Party of the Valencian Country (PSPV–PSOE)	Socialist Party of the Valencian Country (PSPV–PSOE)
Elche	230,625	Socialist Party of the Valencian Country (PSPV–PSOE)	Socialist Party of the Valencian Country (PSPV–PSOE)
Elda	52,404	Socialist Party of the Valencian Country (PSPV–PSOE)	Socialist Party of the Valencian Country (PSPV–PSOE)
Gandia	73,829	Socialist Party of the Valencian Country (PSPV–PSOE)	Socialist Party of the Valencian Country (PSPV–PSOE)
Orihuela	76,778	People's Party (PP)	People's Party (PP) (PSPV–PSOE in 2022)
Paterna	69,156	Socialist Party of the Valencian Country (PSPV–PSOE)	Socialist Party of the Valencian Country (PSPV–PSOE)
Sagunto	65,669	Commitment Coalition (Compromís)	Socialist Party of the Valencian Country (PSPV–PSOE)
Torrent	81,245	Socialist Party of the Valencian Country (PSPV–PSOE)	Socialist Party of the Valencian Country (PSPV–PSOE)
Torrevieja	82,599	The Greens (LV)	People's Party (PP)
**Valencia**	791,413	Commitment Coalition (Compromís)	Commitment Coalition (Compromís)

== Municipalities ==
=== Alcoy ===
Population: 58,977

← Summary of the 26 May 2019 City Council of Alcoy election results →
Parties and alliances	Popular vote			Seats	
Parties and alliances	Votes	%	±pp	Total	+/−
Socialist Party of the Valencian Country (PSPV–PSOE)	12,603	43.27	+12.11	12	+3
People's Party (PP)	4,756	16.33	+0.95	4	±0
Commitment to Alcoy: Municipal Commitment (Compromís Municipal)	2,568	8.82	−3.16	2	−1
Citizens–Party of the Citizenry (Cs)	2,473	8.49	−7.09	2	−2
We Can (Podem)	2,398	8.23	New	2	+2
Let's Win Alcoy–United Left: We Keep Forward (GA–EUPV:SE)	2,255	7.74	−11.48	2	−3
Vox (Vox)	1,598	5.49	New	1	+1
Seniors in Action (3e en acción)	228	0.78	New	0	±0
Blank ballots	247	0.85	−0.77		
Total	29,126			25	±0
Valid votes	29,126	99.25	+0.96		
Invalid votes	221	0.75	−0.96		
Votes cast / turnout	29,347	63.39	−5.44		
Abstentions	16,951	36.61	+5.44		
Registered voters	46,298				

=== Alicante ===
Population: 331,577

← Summary of the 26 May 2019 City Council of Alicante election results →
Parties and alliances	Popular vote			Seats	
Parties and alliances	Votes	%	±pp	Total	+/−
People's Party (PP)	39,479	29.33	+3.73	9	+1
Socialist Party of the Valencian Country (PSPV–PSOE)	37,193	27.63	+7.33	9	+3
Citizens–Party of the Citizenry (Cs)	22,267	16.54	−2.17	5	−1
United We Can–United Left (Podem–EUPV)^{1}	12,254	9.10	−9.62	2	−4
Commitment to Alicante: Municipal Commitment (Compromís Municipal)	9,043	6.72	−2.31	2	−1
Vox (Vox)	8,580	6.37	+5.80	2	+2
Animalist Party Against Mistreatment of Animals (PACMA)	1,652	1.23	−0.24	0	±0
With You, We Are Democracy (Contigo)	756	0.56	New	0	±0
Regionalist Alicantine Party–Citizen Hope (PAR–EsC)^{2}	747	0.56	+0.23	0	±0
Forward–The Eco-pacifist Greens (Avant–LV)	444	0.33	New	0	±0
Democratic Centre Coalition (CCD)	334	0.25	New	0	±0
Act (PACT)	274	0.20	New	0	±0
Communist Party of the Peoples of Spain (PCPE)	226	0.17	−0.44	0	±0
Seniors in Action (3e en acción)	208	0.15	New	0	±0
Together We Win (JC)	165	0.12	New	0	±0
The Left of Alicante–Republics Now–Municipal Agreement (EA–AR–AM)	101	0.08	New	0	±0
Spanish Phalanx of the CNSO (FE de las JONS)	72	0.05	−0.19	0	±0
Alicantine Regional Alternative (ARAL)	66	0.05	−0.06	0	±0
Libertarian Party (P–LIB)	55	0.04	−0.11	0	±0
Blank ballots	676	0.50	−0.66		
Total	134,592			25	±0
Valid votes	134,592	99.63	+0.48		
Invalid votes	501	0.37	−0.48		
Votes cast / turnout	135,093	56.03	−7.22		
Abstentions	106,005	43.97	+7.22		
Registered voters	241,098				
Sources
Footnotes: ^{1} United We Can–United Left results are compared to Let's Win Alicante: Citizen Agreement totals in the 2015 election.; ^{2} Regionalist Alicantine Party–Citizen Hope results are compared to Citizen Hope–Together for Alicante totals in the 2015 election.

=== Benidorm ===
Population: 67,558

← Summary of the 26 May 2019 City Council of Benidorm election results →
Parties and alliances	Popular vote			Seats	
Parties and alliances	Votes	%	±pp	Total	+/−
People's Party (PP)	9,162	39.68	+12.50	13	+5
Socialist Party of the Valencian Country (PSPV–PSOE)	7,329	31.74	+9.45	10	+3
Citizens–Party of the Citizenry (Cs)	2,015	8.73	−0.76	2	−1
Commitment to Benidorm: Municipal Commitment (Compromís Municipal)	1,046	4.53	−2.47	0	−2
We Can (Podem)	944	4.09	New	0	±0
Vox (Vox)	784	3.40	New	0	±0
With You, We Are Democracy (Contigo)	393	1.70	New	0	±0
Democratic Centre Coalition (CCD)	393	1.70	New	0	±0
The Eco-pacifist Greens (Centro Moderado)	300	1.30	New	0	±0
United Left–Republican Left: We Keep Forward (EU–ER:SE)	299	1.29	−2.54	0	±0
We Are Benidorm–Neighbourhood Platform (SOM–BND)	174	0.75	New	0	±0
For the Commerce and Housing of Benidorm (CVBenidorm)	54	0.23	New	0	±0
Union of Independent Citizens (UCIN)	51	0.22	New	0	±0
Citizens for Benidorm (CBM)	n/a	n/a	−12.00	0	−3
Liberals of Benidorm (Liberales)	n/a	n/a	−8.95	0	−2
Blank ballots	145	0.63	−0.87		
Total	23,089			25	±0
Valid votes	23,089	99.34	+1.05		
Invalid votes	153	0.66	−1.05		
Votes cast / turnout	23,242	53.08	−4.10		
Abstentions	20,543	46.92	+4.10		
Registered voters	43,785				

=== Castellón de la Plana ===
Population: 170,888

← Summary of the 26 May 2019 City Council of Castellón de la Plana election results →
Parties and alliances	Popular vote			Seats	
Parties and alliances	Votes	%	±pp	Total	+/−
Socialist Party of the Valencian Country (PSPV–PSOE)	25,550	34.78	+13.76	10	+4
People's Party (PP)	17,608	23.97	−1.99	7	−1
Citizens–Party of the Citizenry (Cs)	10,345	14.08	−0.93	4	−1
Commitment to Castellón: Municipal Commitment (Compromís Municipal)	8,565	11.66	−2.27	3	−1
United We Can–On the Move–United Left (Podemos–CSenMov–EUPV)^{1}	4,808	6.55	−10.20	2	−2
Vox (Vox)	4,704	6.40	+5.59	1	+1
Animalist Party Against Mistreatment of Animals (PACMA)	634	0.86	New	0	±0
Democratic Centre Coalition (CCD)	353	0.48	−0.54	0	±0
The Left of Castellón–Municipal Agreement (L'EdC–AM)	234	0.32	New	0	±0
Valencian Democrats (DV)	206	0.28	New	0	±0
Spanish Phalanx of the CNSO (FE de las JONS)	61	0.08	New	0	±0
Blank ballots	391	0.53	−0.79		
Total	73,459			27	±0
Valid votes	73,459	99.56	+0.53		
Invalid votes	325	0.44	−0.53		
Votes cast / turnout	73,784	60.61	−5.91		
Abstentions	47,961	39.39	+5.91		
Registered voters	121,745				
Sources
Footnotes: ^{1} United We Can–On the Move–United Left results are compared to the combined totals of Castellón on the Move and The Left of Castellón totals in the 2015 election.

=== Elche ===
Population: 230,625

← Summary of the 26 May 2019 City Council of Elche election results →
Parties and alliances	Popular vote			Seats	
Parties and alliances	Votes	%	±pp	Total	+/−
Socialist Party of the Valencian Country (PSPV–PSOE)	37,390	36.80	+10.60	12	+4
People's Party (PP)	28,150	27.71	−1.92	9	±0
Citizens–Party of the Citizenry (Cs)	8,997	8.85	−0.79	2	−1
Commitment to Elche: Municipal Commitment (Compromís Municipal)	6,598	6.49	−7.29	2	−2
Vox (Vox)	6,025	5.93	New	2	+2
We Can (Podemos)	4,660	4.59	New	0	±0
Ilicitans for Elche (Ilicitanos)	3,046	3.00	−3.55	0	−2
Party of Elche (Partido de Elche/Partit d'Elx)	2,888	2.84	−3.01	0	−1
With You, We Are Democracy (Contigo)	1,256	1.24	New	0	±0
Decide–Choose (DTET)	1,104	1.09	New	0	±0
Stand Up Elche: We Keep Forward (EUPV–ERPV:SE)^{1}	711	0.70	−3.17	0	±0
Communist Party of the Peoples of Spain (PCPE)	121	0.12	−0.18	0	±0
Communist Party of the Workers of Spain (PCTE)	48	0.05	New	0	±0
Democratic People (Poble)	41	0.04	New	0	±0
Blank ballots	569	0.56	−0.53		
Total	101,604			27	±0
Valid votes	101,604	99.63	+0.49		
Invalid votes	377	0.37	−0.49		
Votes cast / turnout	101,981	59.65	−6.84		
Abstentions	68,990	40.35	+6.84		
Registered voters	170,971				
Sources
Footnotes: ^{1} Stand Up Elche: We Keep Forward results are compared to United Left of the Valencian Country: Citizen Agreement totals in the 2015 election.

=== Elda ===
Population: 52,404

← Summary of the 26 May 2019 City Council of Elda election results →
Parties and alliances	Popular vote			Seats	
Parties and alliances	Votes	%	±pp	Total	+/−
Socialist Party of the Valencian Country (PSPV–PSOE)	10,157	40.23	+8.48	13	+4
People's Party (PP)	4,584	18.16	−5.80	5	−2
Citizens–Party of the Citizenry (Cs)	4,101	16.24	+6.24	5	+2
Vox (Vox)	1,407	5.57	+4.76	1	+1
United Left of the Valencian Country: We Keep Forward (EUPV:SE)	1,285	5.09	−2.47	1	−1
Commitment to Elda: Municipal Commitment (Compromís Municipal)	1,144	4.53	−3.67	0	−2
We Can (Podemos)^{1}	1,002	3.97	−6.02	0	−2
We Are Elda (SE)	527	2.09	New	0	±0
With You, We Are Democracy (Contigo)	426	1.69	New	0	±0
Eldensan Movement (ESM–CCD–LV)^{2}	277	1.10	−1.17	0	±0
Impulse (Impulsa)	151	0.60	New	0	±0
Blank ballots	188	0.74	−0.68		
Total	25,249			25	±0
Valid votes	25,249	99.44	+0.55		
Invalid votes	143	0.56	−0.55		
Votes cast / turnout	25,392	60.62	−5.99		
Abstentions	16,497	39.38	+5.99		
Registered voters	41,889				
Sources
Footnotes: ^{1} We Can results are compared to Yes We Can! Elda totals in the 2015 election.; ^{2} Eldensan Movement results are compare to Citizens of Democratic Centre totals in the 2015 election.

=== Gandia ===
Population: 73,829

← Summary of the 26 May 2019 City Council of Gandia election results →
Parties and alliances	Popular vote			Seats	
Parties and alliances	Votes	%	±pp	Total	+/−
Socialist Party of the Valencian Country (PSPV–PSOE)	11,921	35.80	+9.93	11	+4
People's Party (PP)	10,741	32.26	−6.71	9	−3
Commitment–More United Gandia (Compromís–EUPV–ERPV)	4,652	13.97	−3.44	4	−1
Citizens–Party of the Citizenry (Cs)	1,819	5.46	+0.26	1	±0
Vox (Vox)	1,464	4.40	New	0	±0
We Can (Podem)^{1}	1,093	3.28	−1.45	0	±0
The Greens (LV/EV)	1,007	3.02	+1.07	0	±0
Valencian Democrats (DV)	339	1.02	New	0	±0
Blank ballots	261	0.78	−0.45		
Total	33,297			25	±0
Valid votes	33,297	99.42	+0.53		
Invalid votes	194	0.58	−0.53		
Votes cast / turnout	33,491	65.66	−6.73		
Abstentions	17,516	34.34	+6.73		
Registered voters	51,007				
Sources
Footnotes: ^{1} We Can are compared to Yes We Can Gandia totals in the 2015 election.

=== Orihuela ===
Population: 76,778

← Summary of the 26 May 2019 City Council of Orihuela election results →
Parties and alliances	Popular vote			Seats	
Parties and alliances	Votes	%	±pp	Total	+/−
People's Party (PP)	9,496	33.83	−2.56	9	−2
Socialist Party of the Valencian Country (PSPV–PSOE)	6,519	23.22	−2.23	6	−2
Citizens–Party of the Citizenry (Cs)	5,371	19.13	+9.34	5	+2
Let's Change Orihuela–Clear: United We Can (UP)^{1}	3,695	13.16	−0.89	3	+1
Vox (Vox)	1,932	6.88	+6.43	2	+2
Commitment to Orihuela: Municipal Commitment (Compromís Municipal)	759	2.70	+0.18	0	±0
Communist Party of the Peoples of Spain (PCPE)	98	0.35	−0.05	0	±0
Democratic Forum (FDEE)	n/a	n/a	−5.15	0	−1
Blank ballots	199	0.71	−0.79		
Total	28,069			25	±0
Valid votes	28,069	99.24	+0.93		
Invalid votes	214	0.76	−0.93		
Votes cast / turnout	28,283	60.02	−2.60		
Abstentions	18,838	39.98	+2.60		
Registered voters	47,121				
Sources
Footnotes: ^{1} Let's Change Orihuela–Clear: United We Can results are compared to the combined totals of Let's Change Orihuela–United Left–The Greens and Clear in the 2015 election.

=== Paterna ===
Population: 69,156

← Summary of the 26 May 2019 City Council of Paterna election results →
Parties and alliances	Popular vote			Seats	
Parties and alliances	Votes	%	±pp	Total	+/−
Socialist Party of the Valencian Country (PSPV–PSOE)	14,487	47.41	+24.86	13	+7
People's Party (PP)	4,395	14.38	−6.33	4	−2
Citizens–Party of the Citizenry (Cs)	3,975	13.01	−0.06	3	−1
Commitment to Paterna: Municipal Commitment (Compromís Municipal)	3,268	10.70	−9.98	3	−3
Vox (Vox)	2,136	6.99	+6.18	2	+2
We Can (Podem)	1,239	4.06	−5.68	0	−2
United Left of the Valencian Country: We Keep Forward (EUPV:SE)	822	2.69	−3.63	0	−1
With You, We Are Democracy (Contigo)	71	0.23	New	0	±0
Blank ballots	161	0.53	−0.85		
Total	30,554			25	±0
Valid votes	30,554	99.67	+0.58		
Invalid votes	102	0.33	−0.58		
Votes cast / turnout	30,656	60.66	−7.15		
Abstentions	19,880	39.34	+7.15		
Registered voters	50,536				
Sources
Footnotes: ^{1} We Can results are compared to Paterna Yes We Can totals in the 2015 election.

=== Sagunto ===
Population: 65,669

← Summary of the 26 May 2019 City Council of Sagunto election results →
Parties and alliances	Popular vote			Seats	
Parties and alliances	Votes	%	±pp	Total	+/−
Socialist Party of the Valencian Country (PSPV–PSOE)	6,976	23.31	+12.59	7	+4
Commitment to Sagunto: Municipal Commitment (Compromís Municipal)	5,453	18.22	−2.50	5	±0
Portenian Initiative (IP)	4,975	16.63	+3.66	5	+2
People's Party (PP)	3,732	12.47	−5.76	3	−2
United Left of the Valencian Country (EUPV)	2,773	9.27	−5.64	2	−2
Citizens–Party of the Citizenry (Cs)	2,527	8.44	+1.22	2	±0
Vox (Vox)	1,615	5.40	New	1	+1
In Common We Can (En Comú Podem)	1,400	4.68	New	0	±0
Our ADN (ENADN)	217	0.73	−11.23	0	−3
Republican Left of the Valencian Country–Municipal Agreement (ERPV–AM)	81	0.27	−0.26	0	±0
Blank ballots	175	0.58	−0.80		
Total	29,924			25	±0
Valid votes	29,924	99.53	+0.68		
Invalid votes	140	0.47	−0.68		
Votes cast / turnout	30,064	60.82	−6.17		
Abstentions	19,364	39.18	+6.17		
Registered voters	49,428				

=== Torrent ===
Population: 81,245

← Summary of the 26 May 2019 City Council of Torrent election results →
Parties and alliances	Popular vote			Seats	
Parties and alliances	Votes	%	±pp	Total	+/−
Socialist Party of the Valencian Country (PSPV–PSOE)	14,020	40.00	+11.58	11	+2
People's Party (PP)	9,420	26.88	−3.87	8	−1
Citizens–Party of the Citizenry (Cs)	3,164	9.03	+1.15	2	±0
Commitment to Torrent: Municipal Commitment (Compromís Municipal)	2,900	8.27	−7.43	2	−2
Vox (Vox)	2,507	7.15	+6.66	2	+2
We Can (Podem)^{1}	1,312	3.74	New	0	±0
Winning Torrent–United Left: We Keep Forward (EUPV:SE)	783	2.23	−3.30	0	−1
We Are Valencian in Movement (UiG–Som–CUIDES)	318	0.91	New	0	±0
With You, We Are Democracy (Contigo)	283	0.81	New	0	±0
Forward–The Eco-pacifist Greens (Avant)	126	0.36	New	0	±0
Blank ballots	217	0.62	−0.45		
Total	35,050			25	±0
Valid votes	35,050	99.43	+0.25		
Invalid votes	200	0.57	−0.25		
Votes cast / turnout	35,250	58.52	−9.49		
Abstentions	24,989	41.48	+9.49		
Registered voters	60,239				

=== Torrevieja ===
Population: 82,599

← Summary of the 26 May 2019 City Council of Torrevieja election results →
Parties and alliances	Popular vote			Seats	
Parties and alliances	Votes	%	±pp	Total	+/−
People's Party (PP)	10,614	47.08	+9.14	14	+3
Socialist Party of the Valencian Country (PSPV–PSOE)	4,467	19.81	+3.21	5	+1
The Greens: Municipal Commitment (Compromiso Municipal)^{1}	2,666	11.82	−3.51	3	−1
Citizens–Party of the Citizenry (Cs)	1,199	5.32	−1.36	1	−1
Dream Torrevieja (Sueña)	1,159	5.14	−2.64	1	−1
Vox (Vox)	1,143	5.07	New	1	+1
United–United Left in Alliance for Torrevieja (Unidas–EUPV)^{2}	996	4.42	−1.96	0	−1
With You, We Are Democracy (Contigo)	184	0.82	New	0	±0
Popular Alternative of Torrevieja–Independents (APTCe–I)	n/a	n/a	−6.43	0	−1
Blank ballots	118	0.52	−0.32		
Total	22,546			25	±0
Valid votes	22,546	99.33	+0.64		
Invalid votes	151	0.67	−0.64		
Votes cast / turnout	22,697	51.14	+0.55		
Abstentions	21,685	48.86	−0.55		
Registered voters	44,382				
Sources
Footnotes: ^{1} The Greens: Municipal Commitment results are compared to the combined totals of The Greens and United for Torrevieja: Municipal Commitment in the 2015 election.; ^{2} United–United Left in Alliance for Torrevieja results are compared to United Left of the Valencian Country totals in the 2015 election.

=== Valencia ===
Population: 791,413

== See also ==
- 2019 Valencian regional election
