= 2015 Spanish local elections in the Valencian Community =

This article presents the results breakdown of the local elections held in the Valencian Community on 24 May 2015. The following tables show detailed results in the autonomous community's most populous municipalities, sorted alphabetically.

== City control ==
The following table lists party control in the most populous municipalities, including provincial capitals (shown in bold). Gains for a party are displayed with the cell's background shaded in that party's colour.

Municipality	Population	Previous control	New control
Alcoy	59,675	Socialist Party of the Valencian Country (PSPV–PSOE)	Socialist Party of the Valencian Country (PSPV–PSOE)
**Alicante**	332,067	People's Party (PP)	Socialist Party of the Valencian Country (PSPV–PSOE) (PP in 2018)
Benidorm	69,010	Socialist Party of the Valencian Country (PSPV–PSOE)	People's Party (PP)
**Castellón de la Plana**	173,841	People's Party (PP)	Socialist Party of the Valencian Country (PSPV–PSOE)
Elche	228,647	People's Party (PP)	Socialist Party of the Valencian Country (PSPV–PSOE)
Elda	53,540	People's Party (PP)	Socialist Party of the Valencian Country (PSPV–PSOE)
Gandia	76,497	People's Party (PP)	Socialist Party of the Valencian Country (PSPV–PSOE)
Orihuela	83,417	The Greens (LV)	People's Party (PP)
Paterna	67,156	People's Party (PP)	Socialist Party of the Valencian Country (PSPV–PSOE)
Sagunto	65,003	People's Party (PP)	Commitment Coalition (Compromís)
Torrent	80,551	People's Party (PP)	Socialist Party of the Valencian Country (PSPV–PSOE)
Torrevieja	91,415	People's Party (PP)	The Greens (LV)
**Valencia**	786,424	People's Party (PP)	Commitment Coalition (Compromís)

== Municipalities ==
=== Alcoy ===
Population: 59,675

← Summary of the 24 May 2015 City Council of Alcoy election results →
Parties and alliances	Popular vote			Seats	
Parties and alliances	Votes	%	±pp	Total	+/−
Socialist Party of the Valencian Country (PSPV–PSOE)	9,931	31.16	+6.39	9	+2
Let's Win Alcoy: Citizen Agreement (GA:AC)^{1}	6,126	19.22	+9.42	5	+3
Citizens–Party of the Citizenry (C's)	4,967	15.58	New	4	+4
People's Party (PP)	4,901	15.38	−23.43	4	−7
Commitment to Alcoy: Commitment (Compromís)^{2}	3,817	11.98	−7.35	3	−2
Union, Progress and Democracy (UPyD)	989	3.10	+0.03	0	±0
Let's Change Between All (CET)	626	1.96	New	0	±0
Blank ballots	516	1.62	+0.07		
Total	31,873			25	±0
Valid votes	31,873	98.29	−1.06		
Invalid votes	553	1.71	+1.06		
Votes cast / turnout	32,426	68.83	+1.98		
Abstentions	14,683	31.17	−1.98		
Registered voters	47,109				
Sources
Footnotes: ^{1} Let's Win Alcoy: Citizen Agreement results are compared to United Left of the Valencian Country totals in the 2011 election.; ^{2} Commitment to Alcoy: Commitment results are compared to Valencian Nationalist Bloc–Commitment Municipal Coalition totals in the 2011 election.

=== Alicante ===
Population: 332,067

← Summary of the 24 May 2015 City Council of Alicante election results →
Parties and alliances	Popular vote			Seats	
Parties and alliances	Votes	%	±pp	Total	+/−
People's Party (PP)	38,490	25.60	−26.54	8	−10
Socialist Party of the Valencian Country (PSPV–PSOE)	30,526	20.30	−4.76	6	−2
Let's Win Alicante: Citizen Agreement (GA:AC)^{1}	28,155	18.72	+11.11	6	+4
Citizens–Party of the Citizenry (C's)	28,132	18.71	New	6	+6
Commitment to Alicante: Commitment (Compromís)^{2}	13,582	9.03	+5.36	3	+3
Union, Progress and Democracy (UPyD)	4,065	2.70	−2.35	0	−1
Animalist Party Against Mistreatment of Animals (PACMA)	2,207	1.47	+1.00	0	±0
Communist Party of the Peoples of Spain (PCPE)	920	0.61	+0.31	0	±0
Vox (Vox)	861	0.57	New	0	±0
Citizen Hope–Together for Alicante (EsC–JxA)	502	0.33	New	0	±0
Spanish Phalanx of the CNSO (FE de las JONS)	359	0.24	New	0	±0
Independent Initiative (II)	359	0.24	New	0	±0
Libertarian Party (P–LIB)	221	0.15	New	0	±0
Alicantine Regional Alternative (ARAL)	160	0.11	New	0	±0
Spain on the Move (LEM)	88	0.06	New	0	±0
Blank ballots	1,744	1.16	−1.09		
Total	150,371			29	±0
Valid votes	150,371	99.15	+0.45		
Invalid votes	1,294	0.85	−0.45		
Votes cast / turnout	151,665	63.25	+1.34		
Abstentions	88,140	36.75	−1.34		
Registered voters	239,805				
Sources
Footnotes: ^{1} Let's Win Alicante: Citizen Agreement results are compared to United Left of the Valencian Country totals in the 2011 election.; ^{2} Commitment to Alicante: Commitment results are compared to Bloc–Initiative–Greens: Commitment Municipal Coalition totals in the 2011 election.

=== Benidorm ===
Population: 69,010

← Summary of the 24 May 2015 City Council of Benidorm election results →
Parties and alliances	Popular vote			Seats	
Parties and alliances	Votes	%	±pp	Total	+/−
People's Party (PP)	6,779	27.18	−10.57	8	−3
Socialist Party of the Valencian Country (PSPV–PSOE)	5,560	22.29	−16.14	7	−4
Citizens for Benidorm (CBM)	2,992	12.00	New	3	+3
Citizens–Party of the Citizenry (C's)	2,366	9.49	New	3	+3
Liberals of Benidorm (Liberales)^{1}	2,232	8.95	−3.55	2	−1
Commitment–The Greens Benidorm: Commitment (Compromís)	1,746	7.00	+6.13	2	+2
United Left of the Valencian Country (EUPV)	955	3.83	New	0	±0
Yes We Can Benidorm (SsPB)	786	3.15	New	0	±0
Union, Progress and Democracy (UPyD)	704	2.82	+0.98	0	±0
Let's Change Between All (CET)	446	1.79	New	0	±0
Blank ballots	374	1.50	−0.02		
Total	24,940			25	±0
Valid votes	24,940	98.29	−0.61		
Invalid votes	434	1.71	+0.61		
Votes cast / turnout	25,374	57.18	−6.03		
Abstentions	19,001	42.82	+6.03		
Registered voters	44,375				
Sources
Footnotes: ^{1} Liberals of Benidorm results are compared to Liberal Democratic Centre totals in the 2011 election.

=== Castellón de la Plana ===
Population: 173,841

← Summary of the 24 May 2015 City Council of Castellón de la Plana election results →
Parties and alliances	Popular vote			Seats	
Parties and alliances	Votes	%	±pp	Total	+/−
People's Party (PP)	20,770	25.96	−20.64	8	−7
Socialist Party of the Valencian Country (PSPV–PSOE)	16,811	21.02	−5.59	7	−2
Citizens–Party of the Citizenry (C's)	12,005	15.01	New	4	+4
Commitment to Castellón: Commitment (Compromís)^{1}	11,144	13.93	+5.11	4	+2
Castellón on the Move (Castelló–En–Moviment)	10,450	13.06	New	4	+4
The Left of Castellón (L'EC–EUPV–ERPV–EV–FR)^{2}	2,950	3.69	−4.14	0	−1
Union, Progress and Democracy (UPyD)	1,439	1.80	−1.91	0	±0
Let's Change Between All (CET)	878	1.10	New	0	±0
Citizens of Democratic Centre (CCD)	814	1.02	New	0	±0
Vox (Vox)	644	0.81	New	0	±0
Spain 2000 (E–2000)	482	0.60	−0.56	0	±0
Castellón Democracy (DeCs)	349	0.44	New	0	±0
National Democracy (DN)	199	0.25	−0.11	0	±0
Blank ballots	1,059	1.32	−1.44		
Total	79,994			27	±0
Valid votes	79,994	99.03	+0.72		
Invalid votes	782	0.97	−0.72		
Votes cast / turnout	80,776	66.52	+3.98		
Abstentions	40,652	33.48	−3.98		
Registered voters	121,428				
Sources
Footnotes: ^{1} Commitment to Castellón: Commitment results are compared to Valencian Nationalist Bloc–Commitment Coalition totals in the 2011 election.; ^{2} The Left of Castellón results are compared to the combined totals of United Left of the Valencian Country, Greens and Eco-pacifists and Republican Left of the Valencian Country in the 2011 election.

=== Elche ===
Population: 228,647

← Summary of the 24 May 2015 City Council of Elche election results →
Parties and alliances	Popular vote			Seats	
Parties and alliances	Votes	%	±pp	Total	+/−
People's Party (PP)	32,878	29.63	−14.14	9	−5
Socialist Party of the Valencian Country (PSPV–PSOE)	29,071	26.20	−12.14	8	−4
Commitment to Elche: Commitment (Compromís)	15,293	13.78	+11.00	4	+4
Citizens–Party of the Citizenry (C's)	10,694	9.64	New	3	+3
Ilicitans for Elche (Ilicitanos)	7,267	6.55	New	2	+2
Party of Elche (Partido de Elche/Partit d'Elx)	6,487	5.85	+0.58	1	±0
United Left of the Valencian Country: Citizen Agreement (EUPV:AC)	4,289	3.87	+1.06	0	±0
Let's Win Elche (Ganemos)	1,758	1.58	New	0	±0
Union, Progress and Democracy (UPyD)	1,340	1.21	−0.50	0	±0
Democratic Forum (FDEE)	352	0.32	New	0	±0
Communist Party of the Peoples of Spain (PCPE)	330	0.30	+0.12	0	±0
Blank ballots	1,211	1.09	−0.47		
Total	110,970			27	±0
Valid votes	110,970	99.14	−0.08		
Invalid votes	964	0.86	+0.08		
Votes cast / turnout	111,934	66.49	−2.05		
Abstentions	56,408	33.51	+2.05		
Registered voters	168,342				

=== Elda ===
Population: 53,540

← Summary of the 24 May 2015 City Council of Elda election results →
Parties and alliances	Popular vote			Seats	
Parties and alliances	Votes	%	±pp	Total	+/−
Socialist Party of the Valencian Country (PSPV–PSOE)	8,911	31.75	+1.96	9	+1
People's Party (PP)	6,725	23.96	−25.09	7	−7
Citizens–Party of the Citizenry (C's)	2,808	10.00	New	3	+3
Yes We Can! Elda (Sí se puede)	2,804	9.99	New	2	+2
Commitment to Elda: Commitment (Compromís)	2,301	8.20	+5.14	2	+2
United Left of the Valencian Country: Citizen Agreement (EUPV:AC)	2,122	7.56	−0.25	2	±0
Union, Progress and Democracy (UPyD)	1,136	4.05	−1.73	0	−1
Citizens of Democratic Centre (CCD)	636	2.27	New	0	±0
Vox (Vox)	227	0.81	New	0	±0
Blank ballots	398	1.42	−1.38		
Total	28,068			25	±0
Valid votes	28,068	98.89	+0.51		
Invalid votes	314	1.11	−0.51		
Votes cast / turnout	28,382	66.61	+0.62		
Abstentions	14,229	33.39	−0.62		
Registered voters	42,611				

=== Gandia ===
Population: 76,497

← Summary of the 24 May 2015 City Council of Gandia election results →
Parties and alliances	Popular vote			Seats	
Parties and alliances	Votes	%	±pp	Total	+/−
People's Party (PP)	14,301	38.97	−5.68	12	−1
Socialist Party of the Valencian Country (PSPV–PSOE)	9,491	25.87	−9.10	7	−3
More Gandia (Compromís–EUPV–ERPV)^{1}	6,390	17.41	+5.95	5	+3
Citizens–Party of the Citizenry (C's)	1,909	5.20	New	1	+1
Yes We Can Gandia (SEPG)	1,735	4.73	New	0	±0
Let's Win Gandia (Guanyem/Ganemos)	838	2.28	New	0	±0
The Greens of the Valencian Country (EVPV/LVPV)	794	2.16	New	0	±0
Social Party of Gandia (PSdG)	439	1.20	New	0	±0
Union, Progress and Democracy (UPyD)	344	0.94	+0.29	0	±0
Blank ballots	452	1.23	−0.21		
Total	36,693			25	±0
Valid votes	36,693	98.89	+0.04		
Invalid votes	411	1.11	−0.04		
Votes cast / turnout	37,104	72.39	−1.88		
Abstentions	14,154	27.61	+1.88		
Registered voters	51,258				
Sources
Footnotes: ^{1} More Gandia results are compared to the combined totals of Bloc–Greens: Commitment Municipal Coalition and United Left of the Valencian Country–The Unity–Greens in the 2011 election.

=== Orihuela ===
Population: 83,417

← Summary of the 24 May 2015 City Council of Orihuela election results →
Parties and alliances	Popular vote			Seats	
Parties and alliances	Votes	%	±pp	Total	+/−
People's Party (PP)	10,652	36.39	−8.97	11	−1
Socialist Party of the Valencian Country (PSPV–PSOE)	7,450	25.45	+1.58	8	+2
Citizens–Party of the Citizenry (C's)	2,866	9.79	New	3	+3
Let's Change Orihuela–United Left–The Greens (CO–EUPV–LV)^{1}	2,680	9.16	−3.12	2	−1
Democratic Forum (FDEE)	1,508	5.15	New	1	+1
Clear (CLARO)^{2}	1,430	4.89	−9.59	0	−4
Let's Win Orihuela (Ganemos)	931	3.18	New	0	±0
Greens–Municipal Commitment (Compromiso)	739	2.52	New	0	±0
Union, Progress and Democracy (UPyD)	152	0.52	New	0	±0
Vox (Vox)	133	0.45	New	0	±0
Spain 2000 (E–2000)	125	0.43	New	0	±0
Communist Party of the Peoples of Spain (PCPE)	116	0.40	+0.03	0	±0
Popular Democracy and Freedom (DLP)	50	0.17	New	0	±0
Blank ballots	440	1.50	+0.07		
Total	29,272			25	±0
Valid votes	29,272	98.31	−0.54		
Invalid votes	502	1.69	+0.54		
Votes cast / turnout	29,774	62.62	−8.90		
Abstentions	17,775	37.38	+8.90		
Registered voters	47,549				
Sources
Footnotes: ^{1} Let's Change Orihuela–United Left–The Greens results are compared to the combined totals of The Greens of the Valencian Country and United Left of the Valencian Country in the 2011 election.; ^{2} Clear results are compared to Renewal Liberal Centre–Clear totals in the 2011 election.

=== Paterna ===
Population: 67,156

← Summary of the 24 May 2015 City Council of Paterna election results →
Parties and alliances	Popular vote			Seats	
Parties and alliances	Votes	%	±pp	Total	+/−
Socialist Party of the Valencian Country (PSPV–PSOE)	7,447	22.55	−1.88	6	−1
People's Party (PP)	6,840	20.71	−30.37	6	−8
Commitment to Paterna: Commitment (Compromís)	6,829	20.68	+12.91	6	+4
Citizens–Party of the Citizenry (C's)	4,318	13.07	New	4	+4
Paterna Yes We Can (PASIP)	3,216	9.74	New	2	+2
United Left of the Valencian Country: Citizen Agreement (EUPV:AC)	2,089	6.32	−0.79	1	−1
Union, Progress and Democracy (UPyD)	672	2.03	−0.51	0	±0
Participate (Participa)	387	1.17	New	0	±0
Vox (Vox)	266	0.81	New	0	±0
Democratic Forum of Paterna (FDEE)	223	0.68	New	0	±0
Democratic Centre of Paterna (CDdP)	170	0.51	−1.15	0	±0
Party of Paterna (PDP)	116	0.35	−0.30	0	±0
Blank ballots	456	1.38	−0.89		
Total	33,029			25	±0
Valid votes	33,029	99.09	+0.58		
Invalid votes	305	0.91	−0.58		
Votes cast / turnout	33,334	67.81	+2.37		
Abstentions	15,822	32.19	−2.37		
Registered voters	49,156				

=== Sagunto ===
Population: 65,003

← Summary of the 24 May 2015 City Council of Sagunto election results →
Parties and alliances	Popular vote			Seats	
Parties and alliances	Votes	%	±pp	Total	+/−
Commitment to Sagunto: Commitment (Compromís)	6,703	20.72	+5.28	5	+1
People's Party (PP)	5,897	18.23	−15.04	5	−4
United Left of the Valencian Country (EUPV)	4,823	14.91	+2.69	4	+1
Portenian Initiative (IP)	4,198	12.97	−2.16	3	−1
ADN Morvedre (ADNM)	3,870	11.96	New	3	+3
Socialist Party of the Valencian Country (PSPV–PSOE)	3,467	10.72	−6.27	3	−2
Citizens–Party of the Citizenry (C's)	2,336	7.22	New	2	+2
Union, Progress and Democracy (UPyD)	384	1.19	New	0	±0
Republican Left of the Valencian Country–Municipal Agreement (ERPV–AM)	171	0.53	−0.83	0	±0
Building the Left–Socialist Alternative (CLI–AS)	61	0.19	New	0	±0
Blank ballots	446	1.38	−1.17		
Total	32,356			25	±0
Valid votes	32,356	98.85	+0.48		
Invalid votes	375	1.15	−0.48		
Votes cast / turnout	32,731	66.99	+2.43		
Abstentions	16,129	33.01	−2.43		
Registered voters	48,860				

=== Torrent ===
Population: 80,551

← Summary of the 24 May 2015 City Council of Torrent election results →
Parties and alliances	Popular vote			Seats	
Parties and alliances	Votes	%	±pp	Total	+/−
People's Party (PP)	12,229	30.75	−17.18	9	−5
Socialist Party of the Valencian Country (PSPV–PSOE)	11,304	28.42	−3.72	9	±0
Commitment to Torrent: Commitment (Compromís)	6,244	15.70	+8.24	4	+2
Citizens–Party of the Citizenry (C's)	3,133	7.88	New	2	+2
Winning Torrent (GT–EUPV–EV–ERPV–AS)^{1}	2,201	5.53	+1.66	1	+1
Let's Win Torrent (Ganemos)	1,910	4.80	New	0	±0
Union, Progress and Democracy (UPyD)	1,032	2.59	±0.00	0	±0
Torrent Act (Actúa Torrent)	692	1.74	New	0	±0
Spain 2000 (E–2000)	347	0.87	−2.05	0	±0
Vox (Vox)	193	0.49	New	0	±0
Republican Social Movement (MSR)	58	0.15	New	0	±0
Blank ballots	427	1.07	−0.52		
Total	39,770			25	±0
Valid votes	39,770	99.18	+0.12		
Invalid votes	327	0.82	−0.12		
Votes cast / turnout	40,097	68.01	+0.24		
Abstentions	18,858	31.99	−0.24		
Registered voters	58,955				
Sources
Footnotes: ^{1} Winning Torrent results are compared to United Left of the Valencian Country totals in the 2011 election.

=== Torrevieja ===
Population: 91,415

← Summary of the 24 May 2015 City Council of Torrevieja election results →
Parties and alliances	Popular vote			Seats	
Parties and alliances	Votes	%	±pp	Total	+/−
People's Party (PP)	8,982	37.94	−9.52	11	−4
Socialist Party of the Valencian Country (PSPV–PSOE)	3,930	16.60	−2.36	4	−2
The Greens (LV)	3,275	13.83	+4.67	4	+2
Dream Torrevieja (Sueña)	1,842	7.78	New	2	+2
Citizens–Party of the Citizenry (C's)	1,582	6.68	New	2	+2
Popular Alternative of Torrevieja–Independents (APTCe–I)	1,523	6.43	−8.00	1	−3
United Left of the Valencian Country (EUPV)	1,511	6.38	+1.56	1	+1
United for Torrevieja: Municipal Commitment (Compromiso)	356	1.50	New	0	±0
The Greens–Green Group (LV–GV)	315	1.33	New	0	±0
Union, Progress and Democracy (UPyD)	159	0.67	−0.60	0	±0
Blank ballots	200	0.84	−0.21		
Total	23,675			25	−2
Valid votes	23,675	98.69	−0.41		
Invalid votes	314	1.31	+0.41		
Votes cast / turnout	23,989	50.59	−3.31		
Abstentions	23,427	49.41	+3.31		
Registered voters	47,416				

=== Valencia ===
Population: 786,424

== See also ==
- 2015 Valencian regional election
