= Opinion polling for the 2019 Spanish local elections (Valencian Community) =

In the run up to the 2019 Spanish local elections, various organisations carried out opinion polling to gauge voting intention in local entities in Spain. Results of such polls for municipalities in the Valencian Community are displayed in this article. The date range for these opinion polls is from the previous local elections, held on 24 May 2015, to the day the next elections were held, on 26 May 2019.

Polls are listed in reverse chronological order, showing the most recent first and using the dates when the survey fieldwork was done, as opposed to the date of publication. Where the fieldwork dates are unknown, the date of publication is given instead. The highest percentage figure in each polling survey is displayed with its background shaded in the leading party's colour. If a tie ensues, this is applied to the figures with the highest percentages. The "Lead" columns on the right shows the percentage-point difference between the parties with the highest percentages in a given poll.

== Municipalities ==
=== Alcoy ===
Polling firm/Commissioner	Fieldwork date	Sample size	Turnout	PSPV	EUPV	Cs	PP	Compromís	Podemos/Podem	Vox	Lead
2019 municipal election	26 May 2019	—N/a	63.4	43.3; 12	7.7; 2	8.5; 2	16.3; 4	8.8; 2	8.2; 2	5.5; 1	27.0
GIPEyOP	7–20 May 2019	17	?	29.5; 8	10.1; 3	14.6; 4	15.3; 4	10.1; 2	11.2; 3	6.5; 1	14.2
2015 municipal election	24 May 2015	—N/a	68.8	31.2; 9	19.2; 5	15.6; 4	15.4; 4	12.0; 3	–	–	12.0

=== Alicante ===
Polling firm/Commissioner	Fieldwork date	Sample size	Turnout	PP	PSPV	EUPV	Cs	Compromís	Vox	Podemos/Podem	Podem–EUPV	Lead
2019 municipal election	26 May 2019	—N/a	56.0	29.3; 9	27.6; 9	(Note: Within Unidas Podemos.)	16.5; 5	6.7; 2	6.4; 2		9.1; 2	1.7
GIPEyOP	7–20 May 2019	?	?	18.8; 6	28.0; 10		17.9; 6	8.3; 2	9.5; 3		13.1; 4	9.2
Invest Group/Prensa Ibérica	19 May 2019	?	?	23.4; 7/8	29.6; 9/10		19.3; 6	8.9; 2/3	5.9; 1/2		11.4; 3	6.2
SyM Consulting/Alicante Plaza	3–5 May 2019	579	?	19.9; 6	24.7; 8		18.3; 5/6	10.5; 3	5.8; 1/2		17.8; 5	4.8
SyM Consulting/Alicante Plaza	15–16 Jan 2019	528	?	20.8; 6	21.6; 6/7		18.4; 5/6	9.3; 3	19.2; 6		6.2; 2	0.8
SyM Consulting/Alicante Plaza	8–11 Feb 2018	480	58.8	22.8; 6/7	14.3; 4/5	–	27.4; 8	18.3; 6	–	13.7; 3/4	–	4.6
2015 municipal election	24 May 2015	—N/a	63.2	25.6; 8	20.3; 6	18.7; 6	18.7; 6	9.0; 3	0.6; 0	–	–	5.3

=== Benidorm ===
Polling firm/Commissioner	Fieldwork date	Sample size	Turnout	PP	PSPV	CBM	Cs	L	Compromís	EUPV	Podemos/Podem	Vox	Lead
2019 municipal election	26 May 2019	—N/a	53.1	39.7; 13	31.7; 10	–	8.7; 2	–	4.5; 0	1.3; 0	4.1; 0	3.4; 0	8.0
GIPEyOP	7–20 May 2019	28	?	23.9; 7	29.5; 9	–	16.6; 5	–	6.3; 1	9.0; 2	4.5; 0	6.3; 1	5.6
2015 municipal election	24 May 2015	—N/a	57.2	27.2; 8	22.3; 7	12.0; 3	9.5; 3	8.9; 2	7.0; 2	3.8; 0	–	–	4.9

=== Castellón de la Plana ===
Polling firm/Commissioner	Fieldwork date	Sample size	Turnout	PP	PSPV	Cs	Compromís	CSenM	Vox	Podemos/Podem	Unides Podem–EUPV	Lead
2019 municipal election	26 May 2019	—N/a	60.6	24.0; 7	34.8; 10	14.1; 4	11.7; 3		6.4; 1		6.5; 2	10.8
GIPEyOP	7–20 May 2019	25	?	19.5; 5	30.6; 9	17.1; 5	15.2; 4		5.1; 1		11.4; 3	11.1
Invest Group/Prensa Ibérica	19 May 2019	?	?	18.3; 5/6	29.9; 8/9	16.7; 4/5	13.7; 4		5.2; 0/1		12.5; 3/4	11.6
SyM Consulting/Valencia Plaza	3–5 May 2019	570	?	22.8; 6/7	21.2; 6	14.0; 4	17.8; 5		11.1; 3		8.4; 2/3	1.6
SyM Consulting/Castellón Plaza	2–5 Oct 2018	540	?	15.3; 4/5	26.8; 7/8	23.3; 7	13.3; 4	6.6; 1/2	–	8.3; 2	–	3.5
2015 municipal election	24 May 2015	—N/a	66.5	26.0; 8	21.0; 6	15.0; 5	13.9; 4	13.1; 4	0.8; 0	–	–	5.0

=== Denia ===
Polling firm/Commissioner	Fieldwork date	Sample size	Turnout	PSPV	PP	Compromís	GD-CU-I	Cs	CET	EUPV	Unides Podem–EUPV	Vox	Lead
2019 municipal election	26 May 2019	—N/a	57.0	48.3; 12	11.7; 3	12.6; 3	6.0; 1	9.9; 2	4.9; 0	1.3; 0	–	4.4; 0	35.7
Dénia.com	6–9 May 2019	287	?	41.5; 11	10.5; 2	10.8; 3	5.6; 1	8.0; 2			6.3; 1	5.9; 1	29.7
2015 municipal election	24 May 2015	—N/a	63.7	28.4; 7	18.5; 4	16.6; 4	10.2; 2	9.8; 2	9.0; 2	4.3; 0	–	–	9.9

=== Elche ===
Polling firm/Commissioner	Fieldwork date	Sample size	Turnout	PP	PSPV	Compromís	Cs	I	PE	EUPV	G	Vox	CSD	Podemos/Podem	Lead
2019 municipal election	26 May 2019	—N/a	59.7	27.7; 9	36.8; 12	6.5; 2	8.9; 2	3.0; 0	2.8; 0	0.7; 0	–	5.9; 1	1.2; 0	4.6; 0	9.1
GIPEyOP	7–20 May 2019	11	?	21.4; 7	29.6; 10	11.5; 3	14.6; 4	–	–	–	–	10.1; 3	–	8.6; 2	8.2
Invest Group/Prensa Ibérica	19 May 2019	?	?	21.7; 7	38.2; 11/12	8.4; 2	12.1; 3	–	–	–	–	4.6; 0/1	–	11.1; 3	16.5
ESdiarioCV	16–18 May 2019	989	?	26.3; 8	29.5; 9	? 2	? 2	? 0	5.5; 1	–	–	? 1	8.7; 3	? 1	3.2
SyM Consulting/Alicante Plaza	4–5 May 2019	498	?	21.3; 7	29.6; 9/10	12.6; 4	10.1; 3	4.5; 0	3.9; 0	1.3; 0	–	5.0; 1	–	8.8; 2/3	8.3
ESdiarioCV	18–19 Apr 2019	1,462	?	19.7; 6	27.7; 8	? 3	? 1	? 0	6.5; 2	–	–	13.6; 4	6.2; 2	? 1	8.0
ESdiarioCV	18–22 Jan 2019	459	?	21.1; 6	26.0; 8	14.2; 4	18.3; 5	? 0	5.2; 1	–	? 0	10.5; 3	–	–	4.9
SyM Consulting/Alicante Plaza	2–5 Oct 2018	503	67.8	20.7; 6	31.7; 9/10	11.9; 3/4	11.3; 3	6.6; 2	7.3; 2	–	5.0; 0/1	–	–	–	11.0
ODEC/PSPV	26 May 2018	700	?	22.3; 7	27.9; 9	14.1; 5	16.5; 5	4.5; 0	5.3; 1	1.3; 0	4.5; 0	–	–	–	5.6
2015 municipal election	24 May 2015	—N/a	66.5	29.6; 9	26.2; 8	13.8; 4	9.6; 3	6.5; 2	5.8; 1	3.9; 0	1.6; 0	–	–	–	3.4

=== Gandia ===
Polling firm/Commissioner	Fieldwork date	Sample size	Turnout	PP	PSPV	Compromís	Cs	Podemos/Podem	Vox	Lead
2019 municipal election	26 May 2019	—N/a	65.7	32.3; 9	35.8; 11	14.0; 4	5.5; 1	3.3; 0	4.4; 0	3.5
GIPEyOP	7–20 May 2019	21	?	17.6; 5	29.0; 8	20.7; 5	14.6; 4	7.0; 2	5.0; 1	8.3
PP	5 Dec 2016	?	?	39.7; 12/13	19.2; 5/6	16.1; 4/5	4.8; 0	8.9; 1/2	–	20.5
2015 municipal election	24 May 2015	—N/a	72.2	39.0; 12	25.9; 7	17.4; 5	5.2; 1	4.7*; 0	–	13.1
(*) Results for Yes We Can Gandia.

=== Moncada ===
Polling firm/Commissioner	Fieldwork date	Sample size	Turnout	PP	PSPV	Compromís	Cs	a.mun	G	EUPV	Vox	Unides Podem–EUPV	Lead
2019 municipal election	26 May 2019	—N/a	63.8	15.4; 4	35.8; 9	14.3; 3	12.8; 3	3.8; 0			8.3; 2	4.8; 0	20.4
SyM Consulting/EPDA	10–11 Apr 2019	440	?	19.0; 4/5	12.6; 3	14.4; 3	7.3; 1/2	–	5.5; 3		23.8; 6	10.0; 2	4.8
2015 municipal election	24 May 2015	—N/a	71.5	24.3; 6	23.8; 5	17.8; 4	10.2; 2	8.0; 2	7.4; 1	5.8; 1	–	–	0.5

=== Paterna ===
Polling firm/Commissioner	Fieldwork date	Sample size	Turnout	PSPV	PP	Compromís	Cs	PaSiP	EUPV	Vox	Unides Podem–EUPV	Lead
2019 municipal election	26 May 2019	—N/a	60.7	47.4; 13	14.4; 4	10.7; 3	13.0; 3	4.1; 0	2.7; 0	7.0; 2	–	33.0
GIPEyOP	7–20 May 2019	53	?	31.4; 8	14.1; 4	14.9; 4	17.8; 5	9.3; 2	5.9; 1	5.8; 1	–	13.6
SyM Consulting/EPDA	26–27 Apr 2019	664	?	26.2; 8	15.0; 4	12.1; 3	17.5; 5			11.8; 3	7.5; 2	8.7
2015 municipal election	24 May 2015	—N/a	67.8	22.5; 6	20.7; 6	20.7; 6	13.1; 4	9.7; 2	6.3; 1	0.8; 0	–	1.8

=== Requena ===
Polling firm/Commissioner	Fieldwork date	Sample size	Turnout	PSPV	PP	Podemos	EUPV	Cs	PRyA	Vox	Lead
2019 municipal election	26 May 2019	—N/a	60.7	51.0; 13	22.5; 5	5.8; 1	2.2; 0	7.6; 1	6.7; 1	3.3; 0	28.5
SyM Consulting/EPDA	3–4 May 2019	468	?	35.3; 8/9	11.6; 2/3	12.9; 3	8.8; 2	9.5; 2	4.0; 0	15.0; 3	20.3
2015 municipal election	24 May 2015	—N/a	64.6	34.3; 8	31.6; 7	12.9*; 3	6.5; 1	6.5; 1	5.5; 1	–	2.7
(*) Results for Requena Participates.

=== Rocafort ===
Polling firm/Commissioner	Fieldwork date	Sample size	Turnout	PP	PSPV	Cs	Unides Podem–EUPV	IxR	Compromís	Vox	C	Lead
2019 municipal election	26 May 2019	—N/a	72.1	23.6; 4	31.4; 5	14.4; 2	11.5; 1	2.9; 0	5.6; 0	9.2; 1	0.5; 0	7.8
SyM Consulting/EPDA	22–23 Mar 2019	432	?	28.2; 4	32.2; 5	10.1; 1	4.5; 0/1	5.7; 1	3.8; 0	10.8; 1/2	1.9; 0	4.0
2015 municipal election	24 May 2015	—N/a	76.5	27.5; 4	27.4; 4	15.5; 2	12.0*; 1	8.1; 1	7.6; 1	–	–	0.1
(*) Results for Let's Win Rocafort.

=== Sagunto ===
Polling firm/Commissioner	Fieldwork date	Sample size	Turnout	Compromís	PP	EUPV	IP	ADNM	PSPV	Cs	Vox	Podemos/Podem	Lead
2019 municipal election	26 May 2019	—N/a	60.8	18.2; 5	12.5; 3	9.3; 2	16.6; 5	0.7; 0	23.3; 7	8.4; 2	5.4; 1	4.7; 0	5.1
GIPEyOP	7–20 May 2019	78	?	18.3; 5	14.6; 4	11.6; 3	–	–	24.8; 7	10.8; 3	5.3; 1	10.3; 2	6.5
SyM Consulting/EPDA	22–23 Mar 2019	725	?	16.4; 4	11.2; 3	15.4; 4	11.1; 2/3	8.1; 2	19.4; 5	10.2; 2/3	8.2; 2	–	3.0
2015 municipal election	24 May 2015	—N/a	67.0	20.7; 5	18.2; 5	14.9; 4	13.0; 3	12.0; 3	10.7; 3	7.2; 2	–	–	2.5

=== Torrent ===
Polling firm/Commissioner	Fieldwork date	Sample size	Turnout	PP	PSPV	Compromís	Cs	EUPV	Vox	Podemos/Podem	Lead
2019 municipal election	26 May 2019	—N/a	58.5	26.9; 8	40.0; 11	8.3; 2	9.0; 2	2.2; 0	7.2; 2	3.7; 0	13.1
GIPEyOP	7–20 May 2019	15	?	21.5; 6	28.2; 8	12.9; 4	14.0; 4	4.4; 0	6.8; 2	6.1; 1	6.7
2015 municipal election	24 May 2015	—N/a	68.0	30.7; 9	28.4; 9	15.7; 4	7.9; 2	5.5; 1	0.5; 0	–	2.3

=== Torrevieja ===
Polling firm/Commissioner	Fieldwork date	Sample size	Turnout	PP	PSPV	LVPV	ST	Cs	APTCe	EUPV	Vox	Lead
2019 municipal election	26 May 2019	—N/a	51.1	47.1; 14	19.8; 5	11.8; 3	5.1; 1	5.3; 1	–	4.4; 0	5.1; 1	27.3
GIPEyOP	7–20 May 2019	25	?	30.2; 8	18.7; 5	7.8; 2	14.9; 4	11.1; 3	–	5.3; 1	10.0; 2	11.5
GIPEyOP	10 Mar 2018	?	?	39.3; 11/12	14.6; 4	12.2; 3	5.9; 1/2	14.2; 4	2.2; 0	5.5; 1	–	24.7
2015 municipal election	24 May 2015	—N/a	50.6	37.9; 11	16.6; 4	13.8; 4	7.8; 2	6.7; 2	6.4; 1	6.4; 1	–	21.3

=== Utiel ===
Polling firm/Commissioner	Fieldwork date	Sample size	Turnout	PP	PSPV	RUYA	EUPV	Cs	Unides Podem–EUPV	Lead
2019 municipal election	26 May 2019	—N/a	68.1	34.7; 6	50.8; 10			5.0; 0	8.0; 1	16.1
SyM Consulting/EPDA	3–4 May 2019	516	?	33.9; 6/7	39.3; 7/8			8.6; 1	14.1; 2	5.4
2015 municipal election	24 May 2015	—N/a	71.0	37.0; 7	33.2; 6	11.8; 2	8.2; 1	7.5; 1	–	3.8

=== Villarreal ===
Polling firm/Commissioner	Fieldwork date	Sample size	Turnout	PSPV	PP	Compromís	Cs	EUPV	Vox	Unides Podem–EUPV	Lead
2019 municipal election	26 May 2019	—N/a	62.5	46.3; 13	20.2; 5	11.0; 3	10.6; 2		5.5; 1	5.4; 1	26.1
PSOE	27 Feb 2019	?	?	44.1– 44.3; 12	20.9– 22.0; 5/6	14.1– 14.9; 3/4	11.0– 12.0; 2/3	3.7; 0	4.8– 5.3; 0/1	–	22.3– 23.2
2015 municipal election	24 May 2015	—N/a	68.8	43.9; 13	23.0; 6	15.7; 4	7.5; 2	4.9; 0	–	–	20.9

=== Xàtiva ===
Polling firm/Commissioner	Fieldwork date	Sample size	Turnout	PSPV	EUPV	PP	Compromís	Cs	Lead
2019 municipal election	26 May 2019	—N/a	65.5	41.5; 10	22.3; 5	15.5; 4	3.9; 0	9.3; 2	19.2
IES Josep de Ribera	12 May 2017	404	?	? 7	? 5	? 6	? 2	? 1	?
2015 municipal election	24 May 2015	—N/a	73.5	27.4; 7	23.2; 5	21.9; 5	13.7; 3	7.1; 1	4.2
