= 2011 Spanish local elections in the Valencian Community =

This article presents the results breakdown of the local elections held in the Valencian Community on 22 May 2011. The following tables show detailed results in the autonomous community's most populous municipalities, sorted alphabetically.

== City control ==
The following table lists party control in the most populous municipalities, including provincial capitals (shown in bold). Gains for a party are displayed with the cell's background shaded in that party's colour.

Municipality	Population	Previous control	New control
Alcoy	61,417	People's Party (PP)	Socialist Party of the Valencian Country (PSPV–PSOE)
**Alicante**	334,418	People's Party (PP)	People's Party (PP)
Benidorm	71,198	Socialist Party of the Valencian Country (PSPV–PSOE)	Socialist Party of the Valencian Country (PSPV–PSOE)
**Castellón de la Plana**	180,690	People's Party (PP)	People's Party (PP)
Elche	230,822	Socialist Party of the Valencian Country (PSPV–PSOE)	People's Party (PP)
Elda	54,815	People's Party (PP)	People's Party (PP)
Gandia	79,430	Socialist Party of the Valencian Country (PSPV–PSOE)	People's Party (PP)
Orihuela	87,113	People's Party (PP)	The Greens of the Valencian Country (EVPV/LVPV)
Paterna	65,921	People's Party (PP)	People's Party (PP)
Sagunto	66,259	People's Party (PP)	People's Party (PP)
Torrent	79,843	People's Party (PP)	People's Party (PP)
Torrevieja	101,091	People's Party (PP)	People's Party (PP)
**Valencia**	809,267	People's Party (PP)	People's Party (PP)

== Municipalities ==
=== Alcoy ===
Population: 61,417

← Summary of the 22 May 2011 City Council of Alcoy election results →
Parties and alliances	Popular vote			Seats	
Parties and alliances	Votes	%	±pp	Total	+/−
People's Party (PP)	12,256	38.81	−11.16	11	−2
Socialist Party of the Valencian Country (PSPV–PSOE)	7,824	24.77	−7.92	7	−2
Valencian Nationalist Bloc–Commitment Municipal Coalition (Bloc–Compromís)^{1}	6,106	19.33	+12.13	5	+3
United Left of the Valencian Country (EUPV)	3,094	9.80	+2.77	2	+1
Union, Progress and Democracy (UPyD)	969	3.07	New	0	±0
Liberal Democratic Centre (CDL)	712	2.25	New	0	±0
Communist Unification of Spain (UCE)	132	0.42	New	0	±0
Blank ballots	490	1.55	+0.06		
Total	31,583			25	±0
Valid votes	31,583	99.35	−0.15		
Invalid votes	208	0.65	+0.15		
Votes cast / turnout	31,791	66.85	−2.15		
Abstentions	15,764	33.15	+2.15		
Registered voters	47,555				
Sources
Footnotes: ^{1} Valencian Nationalist Bloc–Commitment Municipal Coalition results are compared to Valencian Nationalist Bloc totals in the 2007 election.

=== Alicante ===
Population: 334,418

← Summary of the 22 May 2011 City Council of Alicante election results →
Parties and alliances	Popular vote			Seats	
Parties and alliances	Votes	%	±pp	Total	+/−
People's Party (PP)	75,434	52.14	+7.99	18	+3
Socialist Party of the Valencian Country (PSPV–PSOE)	36,255	25.06	−16.27	8	−6
United Left of the Valencian Country (EUPV)	11,008	7.61	+2.75	2	+2
Union, Progress and Democracy (UPyD)	7,306	5.05	New	1	+1
Bloc–Initiative–Greens: Commitment Municipal Coalition (Compromís)^{1}	5,317	3.67	+2.52	0	±0
Greens and Eco-pacifists (VyE)	2,085	1.44	New	0	±0
Neighbours for Alicante (VA)	1,420	0.98	−2.25	0	±0
Anti-Bullfighting Party Against Mistreatment of Animals (PACMA)	676	0.47	New	0	±0
Communist Party of the Peoples of Spain (PCPE)	439	0.30	+0.13	0	±0
Family and Life Party (PFyV)	415	0.29	New	0	±0
Republican Left of the Valencian Country–Municipal Agreement (ERPV–AM)	369	0.26	+0.08	0	±0
Spain 2000 (E–2000)	365	0.25	New	0	±0
Authentic Phalanx (FA)	253	0.17	−0.04	0	±0
Foreigners' Party (PdEx)	94	0.06	New	0	±0
Blank ballots	3,251	2.25	+0.57		
Total	144,687			29	±0
Valid votes	144,687	98.70	−0.85		
Invalid votes	1,911	1.30	+0.85		
Votes cast / turnout	146,598	61.91	+1.66		
Abstentions	90,198	38.09	−1.66		
Registered voters	236,796				
Sources
Footnotes: ^{1} Bloc–Initiative–Greens: Commitment Municipal Coalition results are compared to Valencian Nationalist Bloc–The Greens Ecologist Left totals in the 2007 election.

=== Benidorm ===
Population: 71,198

← Summary of the 22 May 2011 City Council of Benidorm election results →
Parties and alliances	Popular vote			Seats	
Parties and alliances	Votes	%	±pp	Total	+/−
Socialist Party of the Valencian Country (PSPV–PSOE)	10,379	38.43	−4.71	11	−1
People's Party (PP)	10,195	37.75	−10.66	11	−2
Liberal Democratic Centre (CDL)	3,375	12.50	New	3	+3
Party of Benidorm (PdB)	586	2.17	New	0	±0
Alternative for Benidorm (ALBEN)	580	2.15	New	0	±0
Union, Progress and Democracy (UPyD)	496	1.84	New	0	±0
The Greens and Ecologists Coalition (LVyE)	455	1.68	New	0	±0
Commitment Municipal Coalition (Compromís)^{1}	235	0.87	−1.35	0	±0
Republican Left of the Valencian Country–Municipal Agreement (ERPV–AM)	207	0.77	+0.50	0	±0
Spain 2000 (E–2000)	86	0.32	−0.41	0	±0
Blank ballots	411	1.52	+0.24		
Total	27,005			25	±0
Valid votes	27,005	98.90	−0.38		
Invalid votes	299	1.10	+0.38		
Votes cast / turnout	27,304	63.21	+2.38		
Abstentions	15,892	36.79	−2.38		
Registered voters	43,196				
Sources
Footnotes: ^{1} Commitment Municipal Coalition results are compared to Valencian Nationalist Bloc totals in the 2007 election.

=== Castellón de la Plana ===
Population: 180,690

← Summary of the 22 May 2011 City Council of Castellón de la Plana election results →
Parties and alliances	Popular vote			Seats	
Parties and alliances	Votes	%	±pp	Total	+/−
People's Party (PP)	34,707	46.60	−1.31	15	+1
Socialist Party of the Valencian Country (PSPV–PSOE)	19,822	26.61	−12.03	9	−3
Valencian Nationalist Bloc–Commitment Coalition (Bloc–Compromís)^{1}	6,572	8.82	+3.64	2	+1
United Left of the Valencian Country (EUPV)	4,257	5.72	+2.13	1	+1
Union, Progress and Democracy (UPyD)	2,764	3.71	New	0	±0
Greens and Eco-pacifists (VyE)	1,245	1.67	New	0	±0
Initiative for Castellón–Greens: Municipal Commitment (IxCastelló–V:CM)	1,217	1.63	New	0	±0
Spain 2000 (E–2000)	865	1.16	+0.16	0	±0
Republican Left of the Valencian Country–Municipal Agreement (ERPV–AM)	330	0.44	−0.07	0	±0
National Democracy (DN)	268	0.36	New	0	±0
Valencian Coalition (CVa)	212	0.28	±0.00	0	±0
Authentic Phalanx (FA)	105	0.14	New	0	±0
Valencian Nationalist Left–European Valencianist Party (ENV–RV–PVE)	57	0.08	New	0	±0
Blank ballots	2,057	2.76	+0.82		
Total	74,478			27	±0
Valid votes	74,478	98.31	−1.07		
Invalid votes	1,281	1.69	+1.07		
Votes cast / turnout	75,759	62.54	+0.15		
Abstentions	45,384	37.46	−0.15		
Registered voters	121,143				
Sources
Footnotes: ^{1} Valencian Nationalist Bloc–Commitment Coalition results are compared to Valencian Nationalist Bloc totals in the 2007 election.

=== Elche ===
Population: 230,822

← Summary of the 22 May 2011 City Council of Elche election results →
Parties and alliances	Popular vote			Seats	
Parties and alliances	Votes	%	±pp	Total	+/−
People's Party (PP)	49,626	43.77	+1.86	14	+1
Socialist Party of the Valencian Country (PSPV–PSOE)	43,462	38.34	−3.68	12	−1
Party of Elche (Partido de Elche/Partit d'Elx)	5,977	5.27	+1.24	1	+1
United Left of the Valencian Country (EUPV)	3,190	2.81	−3.47	0	−1
Commitment to Elche: Commitment Municipal Coalition (Compromís)	3,155	2.78	New	0	±0
Union, Progress and Democracy (UPyD)	1,939	1.71	New	0	±0
Greens and Eco-pacifists (VyE)	1,120	0.99	New	0	±0
Independent Initiative (II)	982	0.87	New	0	±0
Movement for People's Unity–Republicans (MUP–R)	644	0.57	+0.09	0	±0
Humanist Party (PH)	459	0.40	+0.02	0	±0
Citizens for Blank Votes (CenB)	403	0.36	New	0	±0
Popular Alternative of Elche (APE)	221	0.19	New	0	±0
Communist Party of the Peoples of Spain (PCPE)	199	0.18	±0.00	0	±0
Liberal Democratic Centre (CDL)	118	0.10	New	0	±0
Centre and Democracy Forum (CyD)	111	0.10	New	0	±0
Blank ballots	1,765	1.56	+0.12		
Total	113,371			27	±0
Valid votes	113,371	99.22	−0.33		
Invalid votes	889	0.78	+0.33		
Votes cast / turnout	114,260	68.54	+5.69		
Abstentions	52,437	31.46	−5.69		
Registered voters	166,697				

=== Elda ===
Population: 54,815

← Summary of the 22 May 2011 City Council of Elda election results →
Parties and alliances	Popular vote			Seats	
Parties and alliances	Votes	%	±pp	Total	+/−
People's Party (PP)	13,702	49.05	+3.75	14	+1
Socialist Party of the Valencian Country (PSPV–PSOE)	8,321	29.79	−3.37	8	−1
United Left of the Valencian Country (EUPV)	2,182	7.81	−0.21	2	±0
Union, Progress and Democracy (UPyD)	1,614	5.78	New	1	+1
Commitment to Elda: Commitment Municipal Coalition (Compromís)	855	3.06	New	0	±0
Liberal Democratic Centre (CDL)	480	1.72	New	0	±0
Liberal Centrist Union (UCL)	n/a	n/a	−5.89	0	−1
Blank ballots	781	2.80	+0.10		
Total	27,935			25	±0
Valid votes	27,935	98.38	−1.02		
Invalid votes	460	1.62	+1.02		
Votes cast / turnout	28,395	65.99	+0.58		
Abstentions	14,635	34.01	−0.58		
Registered voters	43,030				

=== Gandia ===
Population: 79,430

← Summary of the 22 May 2011 City Council of Gandia election results →
Parties and alliances	Popular vote			Seats	
Parties and alliances	Votes	%	±pp	Total	+/−
People's Party (PP)	16,824	44.65	+12.82	13	+4
Socialist Party of the Valencian Country (PSPV–PSOE)	13,178	34.97	−5.91	10	−2
Bloc–Greens: Commitment Municipal Coalition (Compromís)^{1}	3,415	9.06	+1.86	2	±0
Platform of Gandia (PdG)	1,529	4.06	−5.34	0	−2
United Left of the Valencian Country–The Unity–Greens (EUPV–LU–V)	904	2.40	+1.29	0	±0
Spain 2000 (E–2000)	411	1.09	−0.15	0	±0
Valencian Independent Group (GIVAL)	409	1.09	New	0	±0
Union, Progress and Democracy (UPyD)	246	0.65	New	0	±0
Valencian Coalition (CVa)	125	0.33	−2.78	0	±0
New Citizen Space (NEC)	98	0.26	New	0	±0
Blank ballots	541	1.44	+0.32		
Total	37,680			25	±0
Valid votes	37,680	98.85	−0.69		
Invalid votes	438	1.15	+0.69		
Votes cast / turnout	38,118	74.27	+3.56		
Abstentions	13,206	25.73	−3.56		
Registered voters	51,324				
Sources
Footnotes: ^{1} Bloc–Greens: Commitment Municipal Coalition results are compared to Valencian Nationalist Bloc–The Greens Ecologist Left totals in the 2007 election.

=== Orihuela ===
Population: 87,113

← Summary of the 22 May 2011 City Council of Orihuela election results →
Parties and alliances	Popular vote			Seats	
Parties and alliances	Votes	%	±pp	Total	+/−
People's Party (PP)	14,765	45.36	+0.61	12	−2
Socialist Party of the Valencian Country (PSPV–PSOE)	7,769	23.87	+1.31	6	−1
Renewal Liberal Centre–Clear (CLR–CLARO)^{1}	4,713	14.48	+5.62	4	+3
The Greens of the Valencian Country (EVPV/LVPV)	3,495	10.74	+1.70	3	±0
Oriolan Representation Party (PRO)	720	2.21	New	0	±0
United Left of the Valencian Country (EUPV)	501	1.54	+0.22	0	±0
Communist Party of the Peoples of Spain (PCPE)	120	0.37	New	0	±0
Blank ballots	466	1.43	+0.12		
Total	32,549			25	±0
Valid votes	32,549	98.85	−0.50		
Invalid votes	378	1.15	+0.50		
Votes cast / turnout	32,927	71.52	−0.41		
Abstentions	13,109	28.48	+0.41		
Registered voters	46,036				
Sources
Footnotes: ^{1} Renewal Liberal Centre–Clear results are compared to the combined totals of Renewal Liberal Centre and Clear in the 2007 election.

=== Paterna ===
Population: 65,921

← Summary of the 22 May 2011 City Council of Paterna election results →
Parties and alliances	Popular vote			Seats	
Parties and alliances	Votes	%	±pp	Total	+/−
People's Party (PP)	15,997	51.08	−2.46	14	−1
Socialist Party of the Valencian Country (PSPV–PSOE)	7,649	24.43	−6.15	7	−1
Commitment to Paterna–Commitment Municipal Coalition (Compromís)^{1}	2,433	7.77	n/a	2	±0
United Left of the Valencian Country (EUPV)^{1}	2,228	7.11	n/a	2	+2
Union, Progress and Democracy (UPyD)	796	2.54	New	0	±0
Ecolo–Greens of Paterna (E–VP)	606	1.94	New	0	±0
Liberal Democratic Centre of Paterna (CDdP–CDL)	519	1.66	New	0	±0
Party of Paterna (PDP)	205	0.65	New	0	±0
Communist Unification of Spain (UCE)	107	0.34	New	0	±0
Republican Left of the Valencian Country–Municipal Agreement (ERPV–AM)	65	0.21	−0.17	0	±0
Blank ballots	711	2.27	+0.75		
Total	31,316			25	±0
Valid votes	31,316	98.51	−1.03		
Invalid votes	474	1.49	+1.03		
Votes cast / turnout	31,790	65.44	+1.28		
Abstentions	16,791	34.56	−1.28		
Registered voters	48,581				
Sources
Footnotes: ^{1} Within the United Left–Bloc for Paterna–The Greens–Republican Left alliance in the 2007 election.

=== Sagunto ===
Population: 66,259

← Summary of the 22 May 2011 City Council of Sagunto election results →
Parties and alliances	Popular vote			Seats	
Parties and alliances	Votes	%	±pp	Total	+/−
People's Party (PP)	10,470	33.27	+1.08	9	±0
Socialist Party of the Valencian Country (PSPV–PSOE)	5,346	16.99	−7.10	5	−1
Valencian Nationalist Bloc–Commitment Municipal Coalition (Compromís)^{1}	4,858	15.44	+5.16	4	+2
Portenian Segregation (SP)	4,760	15.13	−6.13	4	−2
United Left of the Valencian Country (EUPV)	3,847	12.22	+3.26	3	+1
Liberal Democratic Centre (CDL)	583	1.85	New	0	±0
Republican Left of the Valencian Country–Municipal Agreement (ERPV–AM)	429	1.36	+0.46	0	±0
Movement for People's Unity–Republicans (MUP–R)	374	1.19	New	0	±0
Blank ballots	804	2.55	+0.80		
Total	31,471			25	±0
Valid votes	31,471	98.37	−1.15		
Invalid votes	520	1.63	+1.15		
Votes cast / turnout	31,991	64.56	+1.78		
Abstentions	17,561	35.44	−1.78		
Registered voters	49,552				
Sources
Footnotes: ^{1} Valencian Nationalist Bloc–Commitment Municipal Coalition results are compared to Valencian Nationalist Bloc totals in the 2007 election.

=== Torrent ===
Population: 79,843

← Summary of the 22 May 2011 City Council of Torrent election results →
Parties and alliances	Popular vote			Seats	
Parties and alliances	Votes	%	±pp	Total	+/−
People's Party (PP)	18,753	47.93	+4.13	14	+1
Socialist Party of the Valencian Country (PSPV–PSOE)	12,576	32.14	−7.81	9	−2
Bloc–Greens–Platform for the Hospital: Commitment Coalition (Compromís)^{1}	2,919	7.46	+2.14	2	+1
United Left of the Valencian Country (EUPV)	1,514	3.87	+0.08	0	±0
Spain 2000 (E–2000)	1,143	2.92	New	0	±0
Union, Progress and Democracy (UPyD)	1,014	2.59	New	0	±0
United for Valencia (UxV)	359	0.92	+0.54	0	±0
Valencian Coalition (CVa)	120	0.31	−0.57	0	±0
Communist Party of the Peoples of Spain (PCPE)	57	0.15	New	0	±0
Communist Unification of Spain (UCE)	48	0.12	New	0	±0
Blank ballots	621	1.59	+0.41		
Total	39,124			25	±0
Valid votes	39,124	99.06	−0.56		
Invalid votes	373	0.94	+0.56		
Votes cast / turnout	39,497	67.77	+5.58		
Abstentions	18,788	32.23	−5.58		
Registered voters	58,285				
Sources
Footnotes: ^{1} Bloc–Greens–Platform for the Hospital: Commitment Coalition results are compared to Bloc–Greens–Platform for the Hospital totals in the 2007 election.

=== Torrevieja ===
Population: 101,091

← Summary of the 22 May 2011 City Council of Torrevieja election results →
Parties and alliances	Popular vote			Seats	
Parties and alliances	Votes	%	±pp	Total	+/−
People's Party (PP)	11,364	47.46	−5.57	15	+1
Socialist Party of the Valencian Country (PSPV–PSOE)	4,539	18.96	−9.96	6	−1
Popular Alternative of Torrevieja (APTCe)	3,455	14.43	New	4	+4
The Greens of the Valencian Country (EVPV/LVPV)	2,193	9.16	+1.75	2	±0
United Left of the Valencian Country (EUPV)	1,153	4.82	−2.76	0	−2
Commitment to Torrevieja (UCPT)	630	2.63	New	0	±0
Union, Progress and Democracy (UPyD)	305	1.27	New	0	±0
Humanist Party (PH)	52	0.22	−0.18	0	±0
Blank ballots	251	1.05	−0.42		
Total	23,942			27	+2
Valid votes	23,942	99.10	+0.08		
Invalid votes	218	0.90	−0.08		
Votes cast / turnout	24,160	53.90	+2.26		
Abstentions	20,660	46.10	−2.26		
Registered voters	44,820				

=== Valencia ===
Population: 809,267

== See also ==
- 2011 Valencian regional election
