= 2023 Spanish local elections in the Valencian Community =

This article presents the results breakdown of the local elections held in the Valencian Community on 28 May 2023. The following tables show detailed results in the autonomous community's most populous municipalities, sorted alphabetically.

== City control ==
The following table lists party control in the most populous municipalities, including provincial capitals (shown in bold). Gains for a party are displayed with the cell's background shaded in that party's colour.

Municipality	Population	Previous control	New control
Alcoy	58,960	Socialist Party of the Valencian Country (PSPV–PSOE)	Socialist Party of the Valencian Country (PSPV–PSOE)
**Alicante**	338,577	People's Party (PP)	People's Party (PP)
Benidorm	69,738	People's Party (PP)	People's Party (PP)
**Castellón de la Plana**	171,857	Socialist Party of the Valencian Country (PSPV–PSOE)	People's Party (PP)
Elche	235,580	Socialist Party of the Valencian Country (PSPV–PSOE)	People's Party (PP)
Elda	52,297	Socialist Party of the Valencian Country (PSPV–PSOE)	Socialist Party of the Valencian Country (PSPV–PSOE)
Gandia	75,911	Socialist Party of the Valencian Country (PSPV–PSOE)	Socialist Party of the Valencian Country (PSPV–PSOE)
Orihuela	80,784	Socialist Party of the Valencian Country (PSPV–PSOE)	People's Party (PP)
Paterna	71,880	Socialist Party of the Valencian Country (PSPV–PSOE)	Socialist Party of the Valencian Country (PSPV–PSOE)
Sagunto	68,066	Socialist Party of the Valencian Country (PSPV–PSOE)	Socialist Party of the Valencian Country (PSPV–PSOE)
Torrent	85,142	Socialist Party of the Valencian Country (PSPV–PSOE)	People's Party (PP)
Torrevieja	83,547	People's Party (PP)	People's Party (PP)
**Valencia**	792,492	Commitment Coalition (Compromís)	People's Party (PP)

== Municipalities ==
=== Alcoy ===
Population: 58,960

← Summary of the 28 May 2023 City Council of Alcoy election results →
Parties and alliances	Popular vote			Seats	
Parties and alliances	Votes	%	±pp	Total	+/−
Socialist Party of the Valencian Country (PSPV–PSOE)	8,941	29.77	−13.50	9	−3
People's Party (PP)	8,874	29.55	+13.22	8	+4
Commitment to Alcoy: Agreement to Win (Acord per Guanyar)	3,644	12.13	+3.31	3	+1
Vox (Vox)	3,211	10.69	+5.20	3	+2
Let's Win Alcoy United Left: Forward (EUPV:Endavant)	2,629	8.75	+1.01	2	±0
We Can (Podem)	1,140	3.80	−4.43	0	−2
Citizens–Party of the Citizenry (CS)	553	1.84	−6.65	0	−2
Independent Democratic Action (ADIN)	292	0.97	New	0	±0
Seniors in Action (3e en acción)	222	0.74	−0.04	0	±0
Blank ballots	523	1.74	+0.89		
Total	30,029			25	±0
Valid votes	30,029	98.26	−0.99		
Invalid votes	533	1.74	+0.99		
Votes cast / turnout	30,562	66.44	+3.05		
Abstentions	15,435	33.56	−3.05		
Registered voters	45,997				

=== Alicante ===
Population: 338,577

← Summary of the 28 May 2023 City Council of Alicante election results →
Parties and alliances	Popular vote			Seats	
Parties and alliances	Votes	%	±pp	Total	+/−
People's Party (PP)	59,905	40.74	+11.41	14	+5
Socialist Party of the Valencian Country (PSPV–PSOE)	38,146	25.94	−1.69	8	−1
Vox (Vox)	21,084	14.34	+7.97	4	+2
Commitment to Alicante: Agreement to Win (Acord per Guanyar)	10,839	7.37	+0.65	2	±0
United Left–United We Can (EUPV–Podem:Unidas)	7,392	5.03	−4.07	1	−1
Citizens–Party of the Citizenry (CS)	4,715	3.21	−13.33	0	−5
Animalist Party with the Environment (PACMA)^{1}	1,882	1.28	+0.05	0	±0
Alicante Wins (AG)	509	0.35	New	0	±0
Communist Party of the Peoples of Spain (PCPE)	363	0.25	+0.08	0	±0
For a Fairer World (PUM+J)	202	0.14	New	0	±0
Alicantine Regional Alternative (ARAL)	173	0.12	+0.07	0	±0
Spanish Phalanx of the CNSO (FE de las JONS)	120	0.08	+0.03	0	±0
Blank ballots	1,710	1.16	+0.66		
Total	147,040			27	±0
Valid votes	147,040	99.09	−0.54		
Invalid votes	1,347	0.91	+0.54		
Votes cast / turnout	148,387	61.13	+5.10		
Abstentions	94,348	38.87	−5.10		
Registered voters	242,735				
Sources
Footnotes: ^{1} Animalist Party with the Environment results are compared to Animalist Party Against Mistreatment of Animals totals in the 2019 election.

=== Benidorm ===
Population: 69,738

← Summary of the 28 May 2023 City Council of Benidorm election results →
Parties and alliances	Popular vote			Seats	
Parties and alliances	Votes	%	±pp	Total	+/−
People's Party (PP)	13,964	57.03	+17.35	16	+3
Socialist Party of the Valencian Country (PSPV–PSOE)	6,675	27.26	−4.48	8	−2
Vox (Vox)	1,551	6.33	+2.93	1	+1
Commitment to Benidorm: Agreement to Win (Acord per Guanyar)	881	3.60	−0.93	0	±0
Citizens–Party of the Citizenry (CS)	517	2.11	−6.62	0	−2
United We Can–United Left Benidorm (Podem–EUPV:Unidas)^{1}	492	2.01	−3.37	0	±0
Alliance for the Commerce and Housing (AlianzaCV)^{2}	83	0.34	+0.11	0	±0
Union of Independent Citizens (UCIN)	73	0.30	+0.08	0	±0
Blank ballots	249	1.02	+0.39		
Total	24,485			25	±0
Valid votes	24,485	99.09	−0.25		
Invalid votes	226	0.91	+0.25		
Votes cast / turnout	24,711	56.17	+3.09		
Abstentions	19,283	43.83	−3.09		
Registered voters	43,994				
Sources
Footnotes: ^{1} United We Can–United Left Benidorm results are compared to the combined totals of We Can and United Left–Republican Left: We Keep Forward in the 2019 election.; ^{2} Alliance for the Commerce and Housing results are compared to For the Commerce and Housing of Benidorm totals in the 2019 election.

=== Castellón de la Plana ===
Population: 171,857

← Summary of the 28 May 2023 City Council of Castellón de la Plana election results →
Parties and alliances	Popular vote			Seats	
Parties and alliances	Votes	%	±pp	Total	+/−
People's Party (PP)	28,438	35.89	+11.92	11	+4
Socialist Party of the Valencian Country (PSPV–PSOE)	22,419	28.30	−6.48	9	−1
Vox (Vox)	10,614	13.40	+7.00	4	+3
Commitment to Castellón: Agreement to Win (Acord per Guanyar)	9,393	11.86	+0.20	3	±0
United We Can–United Left (Podem–EUPV:Unidas)	2,699	3.41	−3.14	0	−2
We Are Castellón (Som CS)	2,075	2.62	New	0	±0
Citizens–Party of the Citizenry (CS)	1,713	2.16	−11.92	0	−4
What is Ours (Lo Nostre)	349	0.44	New	0	±0
Republican Left of the Valencian Country–Municipal Agreement (ERPV–AM)	206	0.26	−0.06	0	±0
Independent Democratic Action (ADIN Castelló)	183	0.23	New	0	±0
Spanish Phalanx of the CNSO (FE de las JONS)	95	0.12	+0.04	0	±0
Blank ballots	1,044	1.32	+0.79		
Total	79,228			27	±0
Valid votes	79,228	98.96	−0.60		
Invalid votes	830	1.04	+0.60		
Votes cast / turnout	80,058	65.44	+4.83		
Abstentions	42,272	34.56	−4.83		
Registered voters	122,330				

=== Elche ===
Population: 235,580

← Summary of the 28 May 2023 City Council of Elche election results →
Parties and alliances	Popular vote			Seats	
Parties and alliances	Votes	%	±pp	Total	+/−
Socialist Party of the Valencian Country (PSPV–PSOE)	43,760	38.68	+1.88	12	±0
People's Party (PP)	42,281	37.37	+9.66	11	+2
Vox (Vox)	12,901	11.40	+5.47	3	+1
Commitment to Elche: Agreement to Win (Acord per Guanyar)	6,200	5.48	−1.01	1	−1
United We Can–United Left–Green Alliance (Podem–EUPV–AV:Unidas)^{1}	2,419	2.14	−3.15	0	±0
With You, We Are Democracy (Contigo)	1,592	1.41	+0.17	0	±0
Citizens–Party of the Citizenry (CS)	1,328	1.17	−7.68	0	−2
El Altet Decides (EAD)	1,317	1.16	+0.07	0	±0
Republican Left of the Valencian Country (ERPV)	167	0.15	New	0	±0
Blank ballots	1,162	1.03	+0.47		
Total	113,127			27	±0
Valid votes	113,127	99.26	−0.37		
Invalid votes	846	0.74	+0.37		
Votes cast / turnout	113,973	66.18	+6.53		
Abstentions	58,236	33.82	−6.53		
Registered voters	172,209				
Sources
Footnotes: ^{1} United We Can–United Left–Green Alliance results are compared to the combined totals of We Can and Stand Up Elche: We Keep Forward in the 2019 election.

=== Elda ===
Population: 52,297

← Summary of the 28 May 2023 City Council of Elda election results →
Parties and alliances	Popular vote			Seats	
Parties and alliances	Votes	%	±pp	Total	+/−
Socialist Party of the Valencian Country (PSPV–PSOE)	11,297	44.47	+4.24	12	−1
People's Party (PP)	7,966	31.36	+13.20	9	+4
Vox (Vox)	2,461	9.69	+4.12	2	+1
Elda for Everyone–United for Elda: Agreement to Win (Acuerdo para Ganar)^{1}	1,823	7.18	−6.41	2	+1
Citizens–Party of the Citizenry (CS)	1,081	4.26	−11.98	0	−5
For You, For Elda with Common Sense (PESC)	362	1.43	New	0	±0
Blank ballots	411	1.62	0.88		
Total	25,401			25	±0
Valid votes	25,401	98.76	−0.68		
Invalid votes	318	1.24	0.68		
Votes cast / turnout	25,719	62.36	1.74		
Abstentions	15,527	37.64	−1.74		
Registered voters	41,246				
Sources
Footnotes: ^{1} Elda for Everyone–United for Elda: Agreement to Win results are compared to the combined totals of United Left of the Valencian Country: We Keep Forward, Commitment to Elda: Municipal Commitment and We Can in the 2019 election.

=== Gandia ===
Population: 75,911

← Summary of the 28 May 2023 City Council of Gandia election results →
Parties and alliances	Popular vote			Seats	
Parties and alliances	Votes	%	±pp	Total	+/−
Socialist Party of the Valencian Country (PSPV–PSOE)	14,364	41.48	+5.68	12	+1
People's Party (PP)	12,031	34.74	+2.48	10	+1
More Gandia: Agreement to Win (Acord per Guanyar)^{1}	3,104	8.96	−8.29	2	−2
Vox (Vox)	2,336	6.75	+2.35	1	+1
Project Gandia (Projecte–G)^{2}	1,362	3.93	+0.91	0	±0
Union of Independent Citizens of Gandia (UCIN de Gandia)	556	1.61	New	0	±0
Alive Spain (EVFP)	249	0.72	New	0	±0
Citizens–Party of the Citizenry (CS)	163	0.47	−4.99	0	−1
Civil Action (ACGandia)	99	0.29	New	0	±0
Blank ballots	367	1.06	+0.28		
Total	34,631			25	±0
Valid votes	34,631	98.91	−0.51		
Invalid votes	382	1.09	+0.51		
Votes cast / turnout	35,013	67.22	+1.56		
Abstentions	17,072	32.78	−1.56		
Registered voters	52,085				
Sources
Footnotes: ^{1} More Gandia: Agreement to Win results are compared to the combined totals of Commitment–More United Gandia and We Can in the 2019 election.; ^{2} Project Gandia results are compared to The Greens totals in the 2019 election.

=== Orihuela ===
Population: 80,784

← Summary of the 28 May 2023 City Council of Orihuela election results →
Parties and alliances	Popular vote			Seats	
Parties and alliances	Votes	%	±pp	Total	+/−
People's Party (PP)	11,710	38.63	+4.80	10	+1
Socialist Party of the Valencian Country (PSPV–PSOE)	6,632	21.88	−1.34	6	±0
Vox (Vox)	4,261	14.06	+7.18	4	+2
Citizens–Party of the Citizenry (CS)	3,325	10.97	−8.16	3	−2
Let's Change Orihuela: Agreement to Win (Acuerdo para Ganar)^{1}	2,396	7.90	−7.96	2	−1
Party for the Independence of Orihuela Coast (PIOC)	1,382	4.56	New	0	±0
Concord in Orihuela (CONDOR)	179	0.59	New	0	±0
Communist Party of the Peoples of Spain (PCPE)	101	0.33	−0.02	0	±0
Blank ballots	326	1.08	+0.37		
Total	30,312			25	±0
Valid votes	30,312	98.94	−0.30		
Invalid votes	324	1.06	+0.30		
Votes cast / turnout	30,636	65.29	+5.27		
Abstentions	16,288	34.71	−5.27		
Registered voters	46,924				
Sources
Footnotes: ^{1} Let's Change Orihuela: Agreement to Win results are compared to the combined totals of Let's Change Orihuela–Clear: United We Can and Commitment to Orihuela: Municipal Commitment in the 2019 election.

=== Paterna ===
Population: 71,880

← Summary of the 28 May 2023 City Council of Paterna election results →
Parties and alliances	Popular vote			Seats	
Parties and alliances	Votes	%	±pp	Total	+/−
Socialist Party of the Valencian Country (PSPV–PSOE)	16,677	48.61	+1.20	14	+1
People's Party (PP)	8,080	23.55	+9.17	6	+2
Vox (Vox)	4,541	13.24	+6.25	3	+1
Commitment to Paterna: Agreement to Win (Acord per Guanyar)	2,826	8.24	−2.46	2	−1
United We Can–United Left (Podem–EUPV:Unidas)^{1}	1,041	3.03	−3.72	0	±0
Citizens–Party of the Citizenry (CS)	483	1.41	−11.60	0	−3
United Valencia (VLC)	308	0.90	New	0	±0
Blank ballots	353	1.03	+0.50		
Total	34,309			25	±0
Valid votes	34,309	99.23	−0.44		
Invalid votes	266	0.77	+0.44		
Votes cast / turnout	34,575	66.91	+6.25		
Abstentions	17,100	33.09	−6.25		
Registered voters	51,675				
Sources
Footnotes: ^{1} United We Can–United Left results are compared to the combined totals of We Can and United Left of the Valencian Country: We Keep Forward in the 2019 election.

=== Sagunto ===
Population: 68,066

← Summary of the 28 May 2023 City Council of Sagunto election results →
Parties and alliances	Popular vote			Seats	
Parties and alliances	Votes	%	±pp	Total	+/−
Socialist Party of the Valencian Country (PSPV–PSOE)	13,799	43.49	+20.18	12	+5
People's Party (PP)	6,028	19.00	+6.53	5	+2
Portenian Initiative (IP)	3,762	11.86	−4.77	3	−2
Vox (Vox)	2,508	7.90	+2.50	2	+1
Commitment to Sagunto: Agreement to Win (Acord per Guanyar)	2,490	7.85	−10.37	2	−3
United Left–United We Can (EUPV–Podem:Unidas)^{1}	2,256	7.11	−6.84	1	−1
Citizens–Party of the Citizenry (CS)	309	0.97	−7.47	0	−2
With You, We Are Democracy (Contigo)	298	0.94	New	0	±0
Blank ballots	279	0.88	+0.30		
Total	31,729			25	±0
Valid votes	31,729	99.26	−0.27		
Invalid votes	235	0.74	+0.27		
Votes cast / turnout	31,964	63.73	+2.91		
Abstentions	18,189	36.27	−2.91		
Registered voters	50,153				
Sources
Footnotes: ^{1} United Left–United We Can results are compared to the combined totals of United Left of the Valencian Country and In Common We Can in the 2019 election.

=== Torrent ===
Population: 85,142

← Summary of the 28 May 2023 City Council of Torrent election results →
Parties and alliances	Popular vote			Seats	
Parties and alliances	Votes	%	±pp	Total	+/−
Socialist Party of the Valencian Country (PSPV–PSOE)	15,155	37.54	−2.46	10	−1
People's Party (PP)	13,436	33.28	+6.40	9	+1
Vox (Vox)	5,715	14.16	+7.01	4	+2
Commitment–United for Torrent–Left: Agreement to Win (Acord per Guanyar)^{1}	3,579	8.87	−5.37	2	±0
Citizens–Party of the Citizenry (CS)	1,227	3.04	−5.99	0	−2
Uniting for Torrent–Decide (+XTorrent–Decidix)	775	1.92	New	0	±0
Blank ballots	484	1.20	+0.58		
Total	40,371			25	±0
Valid votes	40,371	98.97	−0.46		
Invalid votes	421	1.03	+0.46		
Votes cast / turnout	40,792	65.93	+7.41		
Abstentions	21,075	34.07	−7.41		
Registered voters	61,867				
Sources
Footnotes: ^{1} Commitment–United for Torrent–Left: Agreement to Win results are compared to the combined totals of Commitment to Torrent: Municipal Commitment, We Can and Winning Torrent–United Left: We Keep Forward in the 2019 election.

=== Torrevieja ===
Population: 83,547

← Summary of the 28 May 2023 City Council of Torrevieja election results →
Parties and alliances	Popular vote			Seats	
Parties and alliances	Votes	%	±pp	Total	+/−
People's Party (PP)	12,640	55.57	+8.49	16	+2
Socialist Party of the Valencian Country (PSPV–PSOE)	4,704	20.68	+0.87	6	+1
Vox (Vox)	2,144	9.43	+4.36	2	+1
Dream Torrevieja (Sueña)	1,169	5.14	±0.00	1	±0
The Greens of Torrevieja: Agreement to Win (Acord per Guanyar)	910	4.00	−7.82	0	−3
United Left–United We Can: Uniting for Torrevieja (EUPV–Podemos:Unidas)	692	3.04	−1.38	0	±0
Citizens–Party of the Citizenry (CS)	202	0.89	−4.43	0	−1
Alive Spain (EVFP)	84	0.37	New	0	±0
Blank ballots	200	0.88	+0.36		
Total	22,745			25	±0
Valid votes	22,745	99.01	−0.32		
Invalid votes	228	0.99	+0.32		
Votes cast / turnout	22,973	52.89	+1.75		
Abstentions	20,464	47.11	−1.75		
Registered voters	43,437				

=== Valencia ===
Population: 792,492

== See also ==
- 2023 Valencian regional election
