= Agustí Cerdà i Argent =

Spanish politician

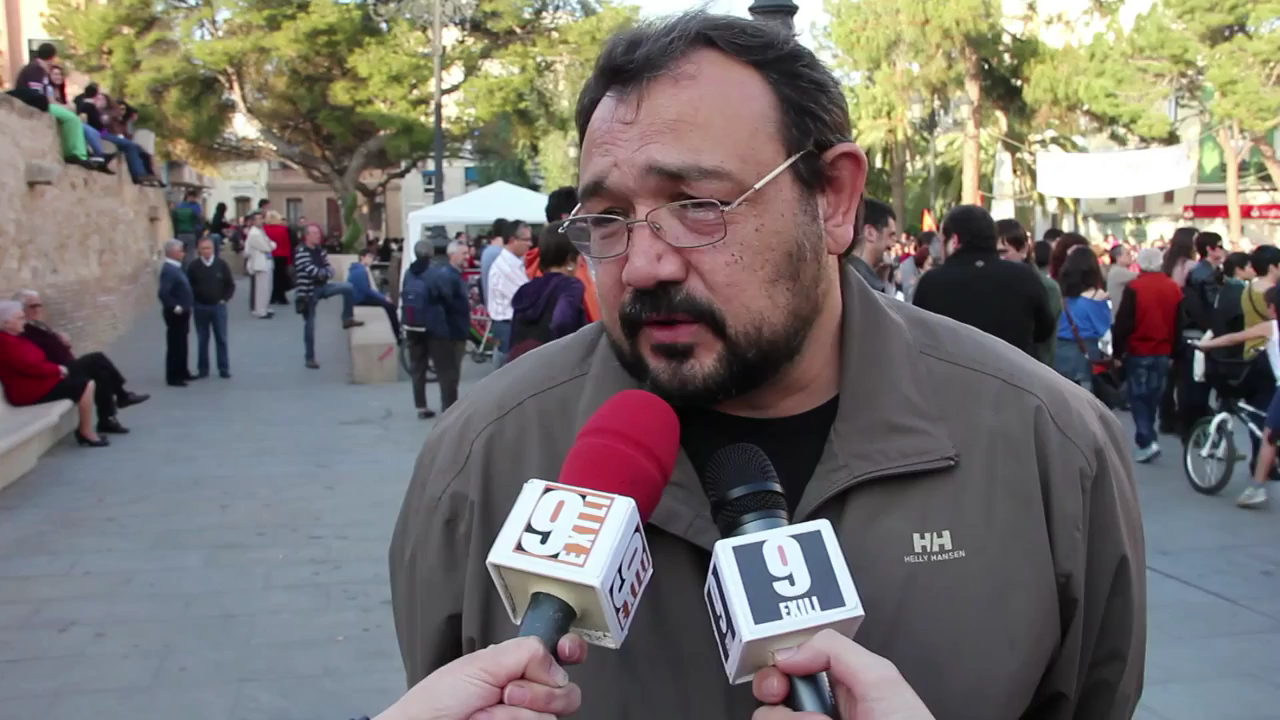
Agustí Cerdà i Argent

Agustí Cerdà i Argent (born 8 December 1965 in Canals, Valencia) is a Spanish politician, president of the minority Catalan nationalist party Republican Left of the Valencian Country since its foundation in September of year 2000. He was a Spanish MP during the 2004 term.

== Background ==
In his youth he was a member of the permanent secretary of the Bloc d'Estudiants Agermanats (Student Brotherhood Block) from 1983 to 1988, and a charter member of the Assemblea d'Estudiants Nacionalistes (Nationalist Students Assembly). In 1985 he entered into the Moviment de Defensa de la Terra (Movement for the Land Defence) and later joined in the Partit Socialista d'Alliberament Nacional (Socialist National Liberation Party of Catalonia), remaining in it until 1993 and entering into its executive. During this period he was one of the founders of the youthful Catalan independentist organization Maulets. In 1987 he was employed by the Fundació Ausiàs March (Ausiàs March Foundation), for the organization of the Premis Octubre, to take care of the classification of 10,000 documents that make up the present file of the Social and Workers' movements, the most important documentary fund on Valencian social and political movements.

Cerdà is a member of the Acció Cultural del País Valencià (Cultural Action of the Valencian Country) since 1984, whom he was manager for from 1992 to 1996. As a part of this task, he coordinated the Casals Jaume I and the parade in Valencia around the civic platform Bloc de Progrés Jaume I.

In 1999 he founded, along with other personalities from the Bloc, the Front pel País Valencià (Front for the Valencian Country), which contested the 2000 Spanish general elections in a joint list with the Republican Left of Catalonia, where he headed the list for the Valencia region, but was not elected. In 2000 July Front pel País Valencià joined in ERC. In September Republican Left of the Valencian Country was created as the union of the Front with ERC. In that foundational congress, Cerdà i Argent was chosen president of Republican Left of the Valencian Country and was also elected member of the national and permanent executive commissions of the party. He was the first in the list for Valencia in the 2003 local Autonomous elections, but again failed to be elected.

Then, at the 2004 Spanish general elections, in which he did not manage to be chosen when obtaining a 0.57% of the votes. In spite of this, he eventually obtained a deputy act since he had also been included in the Republican Left on the Catalonia list for Barcelona, in Catalonia, where the list he was included in did achieve the necessary votes. During his term at the Spanish Congress, he was president of the Commission of Relations with the Ombudsman. In the following Spanish general election he failed to be elected either in the Valencia or Barcelona districts. He remains president of ERPV.
