= Greens and Eco-pacifists =

Greens and Eco-pacifists Verdes y Ecopacifistas
- Founded: 2011
- Merger of: EVPV; LVE; LV–GV
- Ideology: Green politics

Greens and Eco-pacifists (Spanish: Verdes y Ecopacifistas, VyE) was a Spanish party alliance in the 2011 Valencian regional election formed by The Greens of the Valencian Country (EVPV), The Eco-pacifist Greens (LVE) and The Greens–Green Group (LV–GV).

== Composition ==
Party
The Greens of the Valencian Country (EVPV)
The Eco-pacifist Greens (LVE)
The Greens–Green Group (LV–GV)
