= Domingo Pérez, Toledo =

Domingo Pérez
- Municipality
- Flag Coat of arms

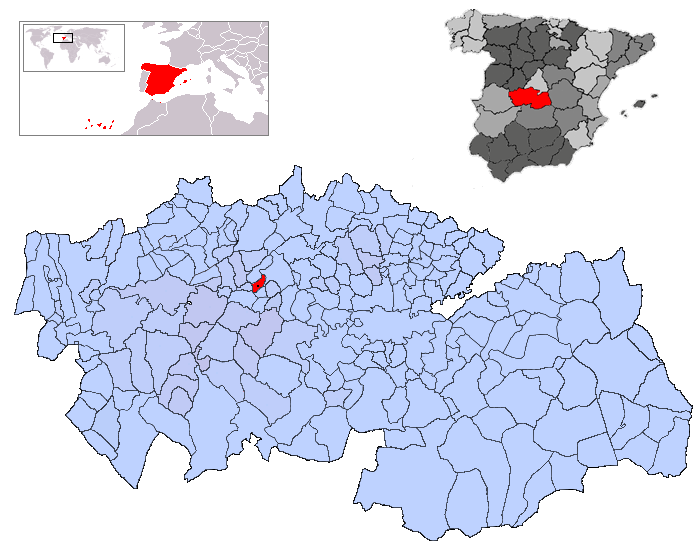

- Location in Spain
- Coordinates: 39°58′37″N 4°30′17″W
- Country: Spain
- Autonomous community: Castile-La Mancha
- Province: Toledo
- Comarca: Torrijos
- Judicial district: Torrijos
- Founded: Ver texto

Government
  - Alcalde: Blas Rodríguez Gómez de las Heras(2007)

Area
  - Total: 13 km^{2} (5.0 sq mi)
- Elevation: 498 m (1,634 ft)

Population (2025-01-01)
  - Total: 418
  - Density: 32/km^{2} (83/sq mi)
- Demonym(s): Domingoperano, na
- Time zone: UTC+1 (CET)
  - Summer (DST): UTC+2 (CEST)
- Postal code: 45544
- Dialing code: 925
- Website: Official website

Domingo Pérez is a Spanish municipality of Toledo province, in the autonomous community of Castile-La Mancha. Its population is 498 and its surface is 1031 km^{2}, with a density of 38.31 people/km^{2}. The mayor is Mr. Blas Rodríguez Gomez de las Heras, of the Partido Popular. The Partido Popular has 5 municipal councillors, the Partido Socialista Obrero has one and there is an independent.

In the 2004 Spanish General Election, the Partido Popular got 89.5% of the vote, and the Partido Socialista Obrero got 10.5%, in Domingo Pérez.

== Demographics ==
Historical population
Year	Pop.	±%
1900	958	—
1910	1,160	+21.1%
1920	1,219	+5.1%
1930	1,359	+11.5%
1940	1,173	−13.7%
1950	1,316	+12.2%
1960	1,179	−10.4%
1970	798	−32.3%
1981	622	−22.1%
1991	535	−14.0%
2001	473	−11.6%
2011	503	+6.3%
2021	325	−35.4%
2023	387	+19.1%
Source: INE
