= Democratic Centre Coalition =

Democratic Centre Coalition Coalición de Centro Democrático
- President: David García
- Secretary-General: José María Martín
- Founded: 10 September 2010
- Split from: CDS
- Headquarters: Avd/ Diagonal, 10, 2º D, Nules
- Ideology: Liberalism; Progressivism; Suarism
- Political position: Centre
- Mayors: 4 / 8,125
- Local Government: 50 / 67,611

Website
- ccd-centro.com

Democratic Centre Coalition (Spanish: Coalición de Centro Democrático, sometimes translated as the Coalition of the Democratic Centre) is a centrist and liberal political party in Spain, founded in 2010 by members of the former Democratic and Social Centre (CDS). Before 2016 the party was called Citizens of Democratic Centre (Spanish: Ciudadanos de Centro Democrático).

== History ==
The party was founded in 2010 by David García Pérez, ex-leader of the Youth of the CDS. In the local elections of 2011 CCD gained 20 town councillors and 1 mayor in Domingo Pérez (Province of Toledo).

In April 2012, and after identifying various irregularities in the Town Council of Domingo Pérez, CCD decided to take the case to the Anti-Corruption Prosecutor's Office, denounced the case in the media and expelled the Mayor from the town. CCD also denounced irregularities in the government of the previous mayor of the municipality (PP).

In the European elections of 2014 CCD didn't run and endorsed Citizens (C's). In the local elections of 2015 CCD won 50 town councillors and 4 mayors. The leader of the party, David García, became the mayor of Nules (Province of Castellón). In December 2016 the party changed its name to the current Democratic Centre Coalition.
