= Valencian Democrats =

Valencian Democrats Demòcrates Valencians
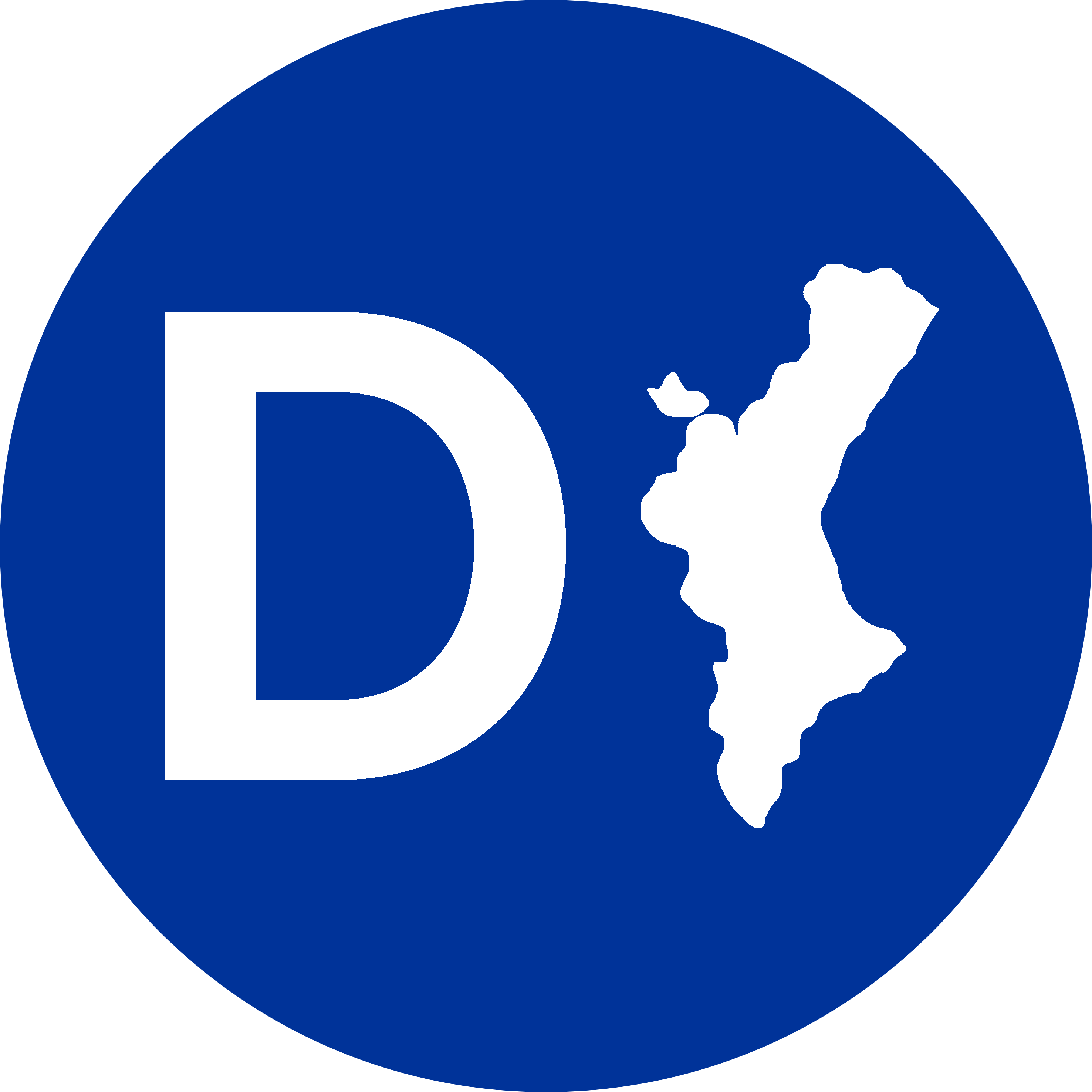
- Secretary-General: Natxo Temiño
- Founded: 2013
- Dissolved: 2024
- Headquarters: València
- Ideology: Valencianism; Liberalism
- Political position: Centre
- National affiliation: CEUS (2019–2024)
- Colours: Blue; White
- Local Government in the Valencian Community: 17 / 5,742

Website
- www.democratesvalencians.org

Valencian Democrats (Catalan: Demòcrates Valencians, DV) is a centrist, Valencianist political party founded in the Valencian Community in 2013 and reactivated in 2017. In 2018, the party achieved some agreements with some local independent parties and in total reached 17 city councilmen.

Natxo Temiño was elected Secretary-General in September 2018, but was replaced by Albert Sarrió in December of the same year.

== Ideology ==
According to its statutes, DV is defined as a "centrist and valencianist" formation, with a "conciliation Valencianism" (also known as Valencianist Third Way) line (overcoming the confrontation between pro-Catalan fusterianism and anti-Catalan blaverism).
