= Acord Ciutadà =

Citizen Agreement Acord Ciutadà
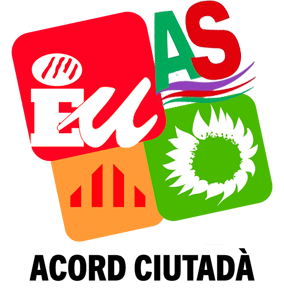
- Leader: Ignacio Blanco
- Founded: 2015
- Headquarters: Valencia, Spain
- Ideology: Democratic socialism Valencianism; Catalanism; Republicanism; Ecologism
- Political position: Left-wing
- Town councillors: 214 / 5,784

Citizen Agreement (Valencian: Acord Ciutadà) is a Valencian political coalition formed by United Left of the Valencian Country (EUPV), Republican Left of the Valencian Country (ERPV), The Greens of the Valencian Country (EVPV) and Building the Left–Socialist Alternative (CLI–AS) to contest the 2015 Valencian regional and local elections.

== Composition ==
Party
United Left of the Valencian Country (EUPV)
Republican Left of the Valencian Country (ERPV)
The Greens of the Valencian Country (EVPV)
Building the Left–Socialist Alternative (CLI–AS)
