= CLARO (political party) =

Political party in Orihuela, Spain

C.L.A.R.O is a political party in Orihuela, Spain.
