= Republican Left of the Valencian Country =

Republican Left of the Valencian Country Esquerra Republicana del País Valencià
- President: Josep Manel Barberà i Sorlí
- Secretary-General: Núria Arnau
- Founded: 2000
- Headquarters: C/Erudit Orellana, 10-1; València, Spain
- Ideology: Catalan nationalism Valencian nationalism Left-wing nationalism Catalan independence Republicanism; Democratic socialism Països Catalans
- Political position: Centre-left to left-wing
- National affiliation: Republican Left of Catalonia
- Regional affiliation: Acord Ciutadà (2015); Valencian Front (since 2026)
- Colours: Orange
- Congress of Deputies (Valencian seats): 0 / 33
- Senate (Valencian seats): 0 / 18
- European Parliament (Spanish seats): 0 / 61
- Valencian Parliament: 0 / 99
- Local Government: 20 / 5,784

Website
- locals.esquerra.cat/paisvalencia/

Republican Left of the Valencian Country (Catalan: Esquerra Republicana del País Valencià, ERPV) is a Valencian left nationalist and republican party.

The original ERPV was founded in 1933, then disbanded in 1935. In 2000 the vacant ERPV name was taken by the party resulting from the merge of Esquerra Republicana de Catalunya's (ERC) Valencian section and the Front pel País Valencià (Front for the Valencian Country).

ERPV is currently the main explicit sponsor of the Catalan Countries independence in the Valencian Country, where poor electoral results so far limit its participation to a marginal role.

== History ==
=== Foundation and disbandment ===
The party was founded during the Spanish Second Republic and became established under the leadership of Gaietà Huguet, in Castellón. In 1935, he impelled a merging with the party Esquerra Valenciana (Valencian Left, EV), founded in 1934 and led by Vicent Marco Miranda (ex-Mayor of Valencia), Josep Benedito, Miquel Duran de València and Manuel Sanchís-Guarner. After Vicent Marco obtained in 1936 the act of deputy in Valencia within the candidatures of the Popular Front both parties joint in a common parliamentary group in the Spanish Congress with the name of Catalan Left.

In 1935, ERPV disbanded and merged as a fraction in EV. The Spanish Civil War truncated many political projects in which Esquerra Valenciana participated, the most important of which was a project of a Valencian statute of autonomy with the official name of País Valencià (rendered in English by some as "Valencian Country", see names of the Valencian Community), which would have granted similar autonomous powers as with the other so-called historical nationalities in Spain (namely, Andalusia, Basque country, Catalonia and Galicia). In spite of it, Esquerra Valenciana, the main party in which ERPV had diluted, reached their maximum growth in that period, arriving to exceed 10,000 affiliated.

Under the regime of Francisco Franco, Esquerra Valenciana (the party which ERPV had merged with in 1935) was suppressed. Then, after Franco's death, the Spanish Transition and the advent of democracy in Spain, ERPV was not revived.

=== Refoundation ===
In 2000, a group of members of Esquerra Republicana de Catalunya (ERC) in Valencia, decided to revive the ERPV vacant acronym and, led by Agustí Cerdà, claimed to have refounded the party as the Valencian branch of ERC.

== Electoral results ==
Then, 2003 saw ERPV's comeback to democratic elections in the Valencian Community, after more than 60 years of its last electoral contest. The party participated in elections to a number of Valencian city councils. It did not achieve representation elsewhere other than in Sueca.

ERPV ran in the 2007 election to the Corts Valencianes under the "Esquerra" name, achieving 0.49% of the total votes which was far from the 5% threshold needed to achieve representation. Out of a total of 5,622 local councilors elected in the 542 Valencian municipalities, ERPV is currently represented by four local councilors in three municipalities, which limits its participation in Valencian politics to a marginal role.

Despite its status in Valencia, at the 2004 Spanish general election ERPV's leader Agustí Cerdà was elected as an MP himself at the Spanish Parliament. This was made possible by including him in the ERC electoral ticket in Catalonia instead of running for any given Valencian electoral constituency, where ERPV does not achieve any representation other than the few councilors aforementioned.

Then, at the following 2008 Spanish general election, which saw ERC's results halved in Catalonia, Agustí Cerdà was one of the incumbents who lost his seat.

=== Corts Valencianes ===
Date	Votes			Seats		Status	Size
Date	#	%	±pp	#	±	Status	Size
2003	7,609	0.3%	—	0 / 89	—	N/A	6th
2007	11,686	0.5%	+0.2	0 / 99	0	N/A	6th
2011	11,129	0.5%	±0.0	0 / 99	0	N/A	8th
2015	106,917	4.3%	N/A	0 / 99	0	N/A	*
2019	5,069	0.19%	N/A	0 / 99	0	N/A	10th
2023	4,570	0.18%	N/A	0 / 99	0	N/A	9th

- * Within Acord Ciutadà.

== See also ==
- Republican Left of Catalonia (ERC)
