= The Greens of the Valencian Country =

The Greens of the Valencian Country Els Verds del País Valencià
- Leader: Toni Roderic
- Founded: 6 November 2004
- Merger of: EV–IPV; EV/LV; IAB
- Ideology: Green politics Ecologism
- National affiliation: Confederation of the Greens
- European Parliament (Spanish seats): 0 / 54
- Congress (Valencian seats): 0 / 33
- Senate (Valencian seats): 0 / 18
- Valencian Parliament: 0 / 99
- Town councillors: 5 / 5,784

Website
- www.elsverdspv.net

The Greens of the Valencian Country (Spanish: Els Verds del País Valencià; EVPV) is a political party currently active in the Valencian Community founded in November 2004 from the merger of Green Left–Initiative for the Valencian Country (EV–IPV), The Greens branch in the Valencian Community (EV/LV) and Alternative Left of Buñol (IAB). It is currently one of the few parties comprising what remains of the Confederation of the Greens in Spain, together with Tour Madrid–The Greens (GM–LV) and The Greens–Green Option (EV–OV).
