= 2027 Valencian regional election =

Election in the Spanish region of the Valencian Community

Next Valencian regional election
- No later than 27 June 2027

All 99 seats in the Corts Valencianes 50 seats needed for a majority
- Opinion polls
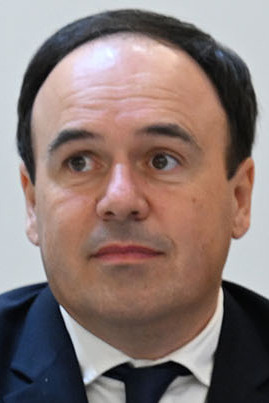

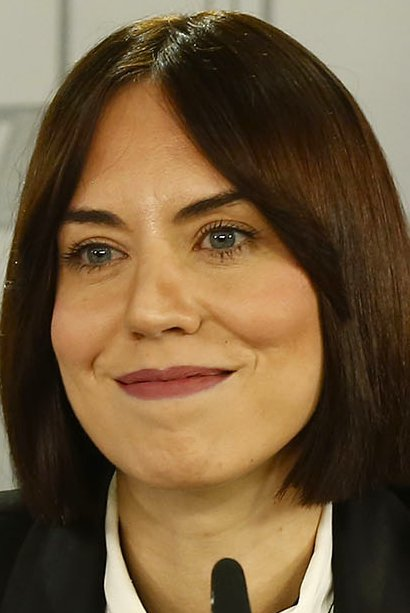

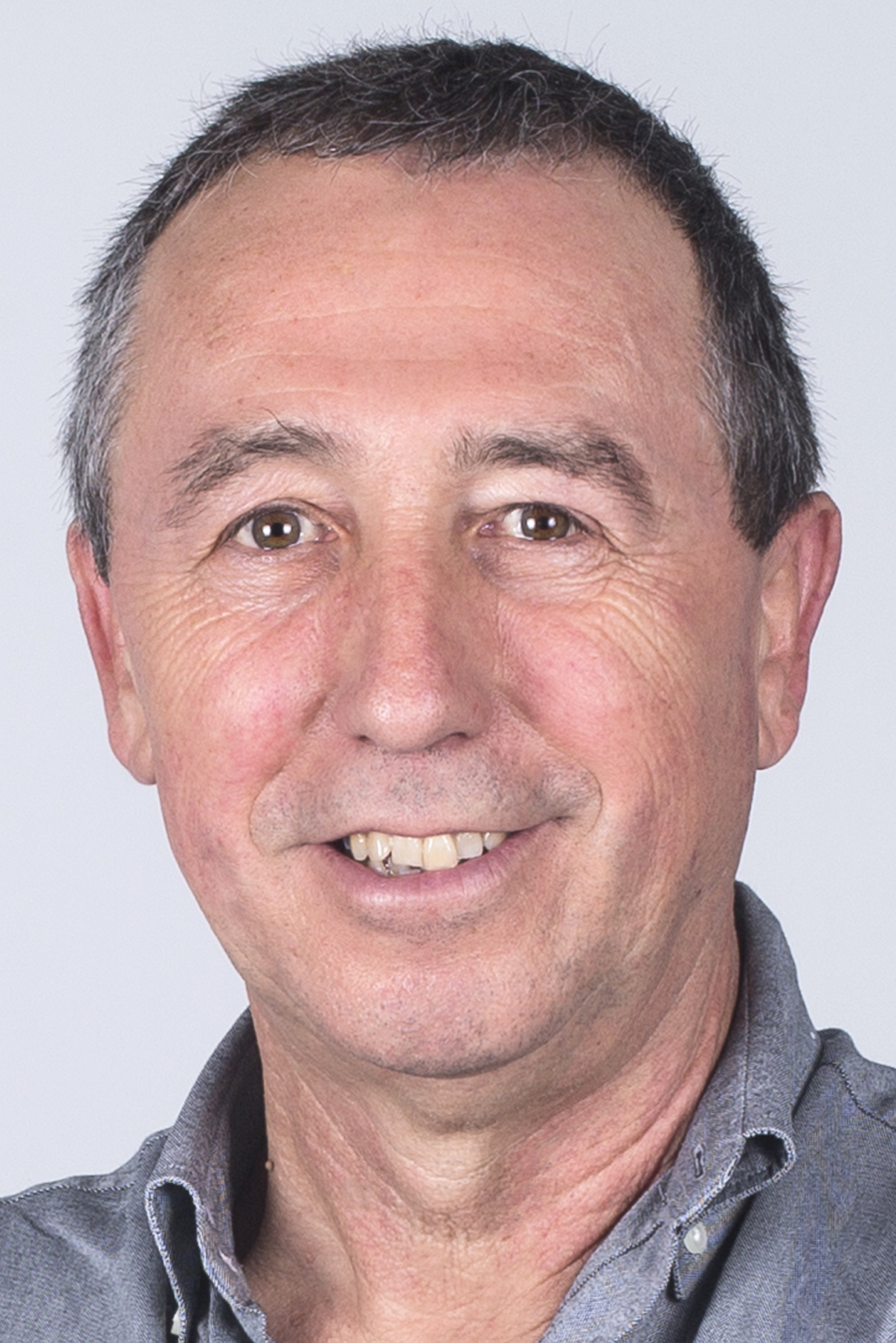

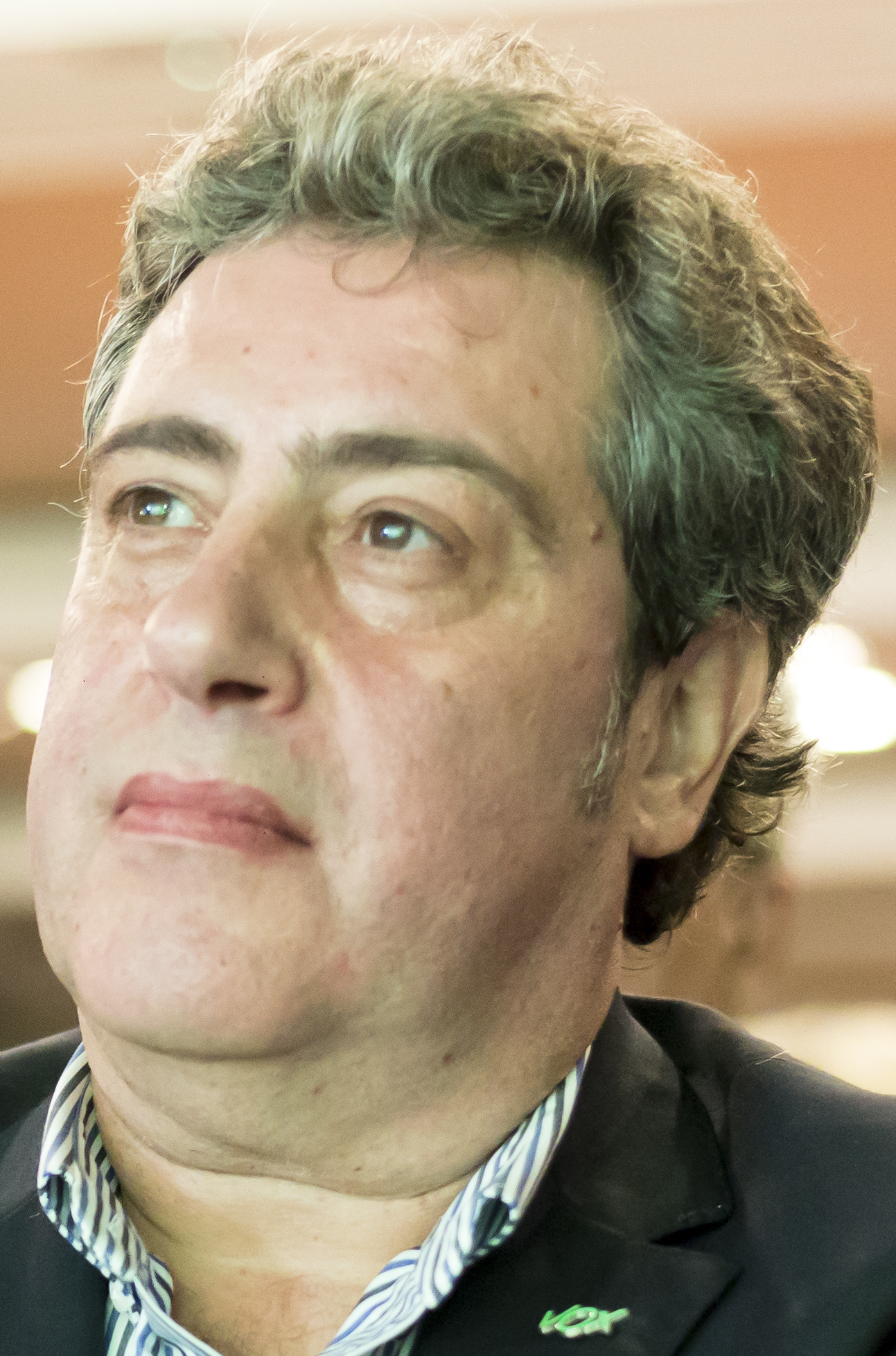
Leader	Juanfran Pérez Llorca	Diana Morant	Joan Baldoví
Party	PP	PSPV–PSOE	Compromís
Leader since	29 November 2025	23 March 2024	13 February 2023
Leader's seat	Alicante	— (Note: Currently serving as minister of Science, Innovation and Universities in the government of Spain.)	Valencia
Last election	40 seats, 35.7%	31 seats, 28.7%	15 seats, 14.5%
Current seats	40	31	15
Seats needed	▲10	▲19	▲35
Leader	José María Llanos
Party	Vox
Leader since	1 January 2024
Leader's seat	Valencia
Last election	13 seats, 12.6%
Current seats	13
Seats needed	▲37
Incumbent President
Juanfran Pérez Llorca
PP

A regional election will be held in the Valencian Community no later than 27 June 2027 to elect the 12th Corts of the autonomous community. All 99 seats in the Corts will be up for election. If customary practice is maintained, the election will be held on 23 May 2027, simultaneously with regional elections in at least seven other autonomous communities and local elections all across Spain.

The 2023 election resulted in a coalition government being formed between the People's Party (PP) and the far-right Vox, with PP's Carlos Mazón becoming the new regional president. This coalition lasted until July 2024, when Vox broke up all of its regional coalitions with the PP. On 29 October 2024, catastrophic floods across the province of Valencia shook Mazón's tenure as the mounting death toll and the poor management of the crisis by the Valencian government sparked widespread outcry, causing the PP's popularity to plummet in opinion polls. Mazón resigned in November 2025, after losing his party's support, being replaced as regional president by PP's Juanfran Pérez Llorca.

== Background ==
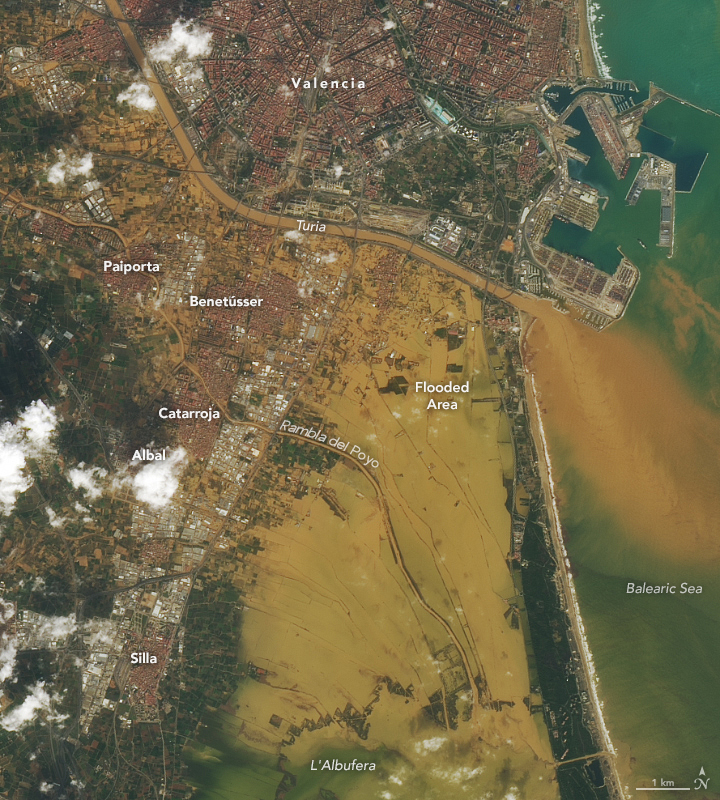
Catastrophic floods swept the province of Valencia on 29 October 2024, with the poor crisis management by Carlos Mazón's administration being perceived as contributing to the high death toll of 229.

The 2023 regional election had seen the "Botànic Agreement" of left-of-centre parties being ousted from power by an alliance of the People's Party (PP) and the far-right Vox party, which formed a coalition government under regional PP leader Carlos Mazón. Negotiations for forming the new Mazón's government coincided with the electoral campaign of the 2023 Spanish general election, a factor which was said to contribute to the PP's electoral disappointment by evidencing the party's willingness to allow the far-right into government despite public pledges to the contrary. This coalition lasted until July 2024, when Vox's national leader Santiago Abascal forced the break up of all PP–Vox regional governments over a controversy regarding the nationwide distribution of unaccompanied migrant minors among the autonomous communities, leading Mazón to immediately dismiss all Vox ministers in his cabinet.

Mazón's tenure was overshadowed by the 29 October 2024 floods across the province of Valencia, caused by torrential rains that brought over a year's worth of precipitation, resulting in one of the deadliest natural disasters in Spanish history with 237 deaths—229 in the province of Valencia alone—and substantial property damage. The Valencian government was criticized for its lack of emergency preparedness and poor disaster response, with Mazón initially downplaying the scale of the floods, then remaining unreachable and his emergency services paralyzed during the most critical hours of the crisis, a late sending of emergency alerts to the endangered population—which arrived when hundreds were already trapped or dying—and the apparent inability of regional authorities to cooperate adequately with the national government. A judicial probe for reckless homicide over alleged negligence in the management of the crisis was opened on several high-ranking regional officers, including the regional minister responsible for emergency services at the time of the floods, while Mazón's popularity plummeted in opinion polls amid his constant changes of story about his whereabouts during the height of the disaster.

Support from the PP's national leadership under Alberto Núñez Feijóo helped Mazón survive calls for his resignation, but his political position remained weak. Public outrage at him was evidenced at the memorial ceremony held on the first anniversary of the tragedy, during which he was jeered and insulted by family members of victims. Added to new evidence hinting at a possible omission of duties while the floods devastated entire towns, and with the judicial investigation closing in on him, Mazón allegedly lost his party's support. With his political demise seeming imminent, the PP descended into chaos on 1–2 November 2025 as the national and regional leaderships vied for controlling his succession. Mazón himself considered resigning and challenged Feijóo by threatening a snap election, while the party crisis deepened due to difficulties in agreeing on a successor and on whether Mazón would be able to retain immunity from judicial prosecution. The latter announced his resignation as regional president on 3 November—claiming that he could not "go on anymore"—pending a negotiation with Vox to elect an interim replacement. The PP selected Juanfran Pérez Llorca to succeed Mazón in the regional presidency, with Vox supporting his investiture on 27 November in exchange for concessions on environmentalism, education, migration and language policy.

== Overview ==
Under the 1982 Statute of Autonomy, the Corts Valencianes are the unicameral legislature of the Valencian Community, having legislative power in devolved matters, as well as the ability to grant or withdraw confidence from a regional president. The electoral and procedural rules are supplemented by national law provisions.

=== Date ===
The term of the Corts Valencianes expires four years after the date of their previous election, unless they are dissolved earlier. The election decree shall be issued no later than 25 days before the scheduled expiration date of parliament and published on the following day in the Official Journal of the Valencian Government (DOGV), with election day taking place 54 days after the decree's publication. The previous election was held on 28 May 2023, which meant that the chamber's term will expire on 28 May 2027. The election decree must be published in the DOGV no later than 4 May 2027, setting the latest possible date for election day on 27 June 2027.

The regional president has the prerogative to dissolve the Corts Valencianes at any given time and call a snap election, provided that no motion of no confidence is in process. In the event of an investiture process failing to elect a regional president within a two-month period from the first ballot, the Corts are to be automatically dissolved and a fresh election called.

An early regional election was ruled out upon the confirmation on 27 October 2025 of an election in Extremadura for 21 December, but gained traction after Mazón lost his party's support two days later over renewed political fallout from his mishandling of the 2024 floods. With the party in disarray amid expectations of his imminent downfall, speculation emerged about going to the polls under a different PP candidate. Mazón reportedly threatened to simultaneously resign from the presidency and call a snap election, seeking to oversee his succession and maintain parliamentary immunity. 28 December 2025, 4 or 18 January 2026 were considered as possible dates in the event of an immediate dissolution of parliament, but the PP faced the problem of not having an electoral candidate. Mazón ultimately announced his resignation on 3 November, with 22 March 2026—according to the legal timetable set by Mazón's resignation—being cited as the most likely date in the event of a failed investiture. Pérez Llorca's investiture as president avoided the risk of an immediate election. New speculation arose during the autumn of 2026, as widespread housing protests across the country led Prime Minister Pedro Sánchez to consider a snap general election; the possibility was commented of the PP advancing the regional election to hold it concurrently with the hypothetical nationwide election.

=== Electoral system ===
Voting for the Corts is based on universal suffrage, comprising all Spanish nationals over 18 years of age, registered in the Valencian Community and with full political rights, provided that they have not been deprived of the right to vote by a final sentence.

The Corts Valencianes had a minimum of 99 seats, with the electoral law fixing its size at that number. All are elected in three multi-member constituencies—corresponding to the provinces of Alicante, Castellón and Valencia, each of which is assigned an initial minimum of 20 seats and the remaining 39 distributed in proportion to population (with the seat-to-population ratio in any given province not exceeding three times that of any other)—using the D'Hondt method and closed-list proportional voting, with a five percent-threshold of valid votes (including blank ballots) regionally.

As a result of the aforementioned allocation, each Corts constituency would be entitled the following seats (as of 11 December 2025): (Note: This seat allocation has been manually calculated by applying the electoral rules set out in the law, on the basis of the latest official population figures provided by the Spanish government as of 2026. As such, it should be deemed as a provisional, non-binding estimation. The definitive allocation will be determined by the election decree at the time of the parliament's dissolution.)

Seats	Constituencies
40	Valencia
35	Alicante
24	Castellón

The law does not provide for by-elections to fill vacant seats; instead, any vacancies arising after the proclamation of candidates and during the legislative term will be filled by the next candidates on the party lists or, when required, by designated substitutes.

=== Current parliament ===
The table below shows the composition of the parliamentary groups in the chamber at the present time.

Current parliamentary composition
Groups	Parties	Legislators	
Groups	Parties	Seats	Total
People's Parliamentary Group	PP	40	40
Socialist Parliamentary Group	PSPV–PSOE	31	31
Commitment Parliamentary Group	Compromís	15	15
Vox Valencian Courts Parliamentary Group	Vox	13	13

== Parties and candidates ==
The electoral law allows for parties and federations registered in the interior ministry, alliances and groupings of electors to present lists of candidates. Parties and federations intending to form an alliance are required to inform the relevant electoral commission within 10 days of the election call, whereas groupings of electors need to secure the signature of at least one percent of the electorate in the constituencies for which they seek election, disallowing electors from signing for more than one list. Amendments in 2024 required a balanced composition of men and women in the electoral lists through the use of a zipper system.

Below is a list of the main parties and alliances which will likely contest the election:

Candidacy	Parties and alliances	Leading candidate	Ideology	Previous result		Gov.	Ref.
Candidacy	Parties and alliances	Leading candidate	Ideology	Vote %	Seats	Gov.	Ref.
PP	List: People's Party (PP)	Juanfran Pérez Llorca	Conservatism; Christian democracy	35.7%	40	Yes	
PSPV–PSOE	List: Socialist Party of the Valencian Country (PSPV–PSOE)	Diana Morant	Social democracy	28.7%	31	15	
Compromís	List: Més–Compromís (Més); Valencian People's Initiative (IdPV); Greens Equo of the Valencian Country (VerdsEquo)	Joan Baldoví	Valencianism; Progressivism; Green politics	14.5%	15	15	
Vox	List: Vox (Vox)	José María Llanos	Right-wing populism Ultranationalism; National conservatism	12.6%	10	15	

Following criticism of his handling of the October floods, regional president Carlos Mazón chose to resign outright, forcing the PP to hastily find a replacement. An internal struggle ensued as the regional party floated the candidacy of Vicente Mompó (president of the provincial deputation of Valencia), whereas the party's national leadership favoured Valencia mayor María José Catalá instead. Juanfran Pérez Llorca, Mazón's deputy in the party, was suggested as interim president until an orderly succession could be organized, with this proposal—along with Catalá's reluctance to succeed Mazón, with she ruling herself out on 7 November—being poorly received by the national PP. Mazón announced his will to resign on 3 November, while urging PP and Vox to elect his replacement. On 11 November, the PP proposed Pérez Llorca as Mazón's successor, with him being elected by the Corts on 27 November.

== Opinion polls ==
The tables below list opinion polling results in reverse chronological order, showing the most recent first and using the dates when the survey fieldwork was done, as opposed to the date of publication. Where the fieldwork dates are unknown, the date of publication is given instead. The highest percentage figure in each polling survey is displayed with its background shaded in the leading party's colour. If a tie ensues, this is applied to the figures with the highest percentages. The "Lead" column on the right shows the percentage-point difference between the parties with the highest percentages in a poll.

=== Graphical summary ===
Local regression trend line of poll results from 28 May 2023 to the present day, with each line corresponding to a political party.

=== Voting intention estimates ===
The table below lists weighted voting intention estimates. Refusals are generally excluded from the party vote percentages, while question wording and the treatment of "don't know" responses and those not intending to vote may vary between polling organisations. When available, seat projections determined by the polling organisations are displayed below (or in place of) the percentages in a smaller font; 50 seats were required for an absolute majority in the Corts Valencianes.

Polling firm/Commissioner	Fieldwork date	Sample size	Turnout	PP	PSPV	Compromís	Vox	Podemos	Sumar	SALF	Lead
SyM Consulting/EPDA	6–16 Oct 2026	2,298	?	36.6; 38/41	25.1; 26/27	15.2; 14/15	19.6; 18/19	–	–	–	11.5
Demoscopia y Servicios/ESdiario	5–7 Oct 2026	1,200	?	33.5; 36/38	24.7; 27	18.5; 18/19	16.6; 16/17	2.5; 0	–	1.4; 0	8.8
SocioMétrica/El Español	1–7 Oct 2026	1,100	?	34.2; 38	23.8; 27	16.2; 16	17.0; 17	2.8; 0	–	1.2; 0	10.4
Sigma Dos/El Mundo	1–6 Oct 2026	1,450	?	32.0; 33/36	22.3; 23/25	21.8; 21/23	17.5; 16/18	1.2; 0	–	–	9.7
Lápiz Estratégico/Prensa Ibérica	24–30 Sep 2025	900	?	39.3; 41	32.6; 34	10.8; 11	12.8; 13	3.5; 0	–	–	6.7
Celeste-Tel/PSPV	3–10 Sep 2026	1,200	?	29.7; 31/34	27.5; 29/32	17.1; 16/19	17.5; 17/19	3.5; 0	–	–	2.2
NC Report/Camps	1–7 Jul 2026	2,600	66.7	31.5; 33	23.1; 27	18.7; 20	17.9; 19	3.2; 0	–	1.5; 0	8.4
Compromís	May–Jun 2026	766	?	31.4– 34.1; 33/36	19.2– 20.4; 20/21	23.3– 25.3; 25/27	15.0– 19.5; 16/20	–	–	–	8.1– 8.8
Sigma Dos/El Mundo	18–28 May 2026	1,602	?	31.9; 35/36	23.1; 25/27	21.0; 20/22	15.2; 15/17	1.2; 0	–	–	8.8
NC Report/Camps	15 Apr–6 May 2026	2,100	66.1	31.4; 32	23.2; 26	18.8; 21	17.8; 20	3.1; 0	–	1.4; 0	8.2
PP	29 Apr 2026	?	?	37.4; 37	28.3; 28	14.1; 14	20.2; 20	–	–	–	9.1
EM-Analytics/Electomanía	1–28 Mar 2026	1,450	?	25.8; 28	25.5; 28	20.4; 21	20.9; 22	3.6; 0	–	–	0.3
SocioMétrica/PP	14 Mar 2026	?	?	? 35	? 28/29	? 16	? 19/20	–	–	–	?
NC Report/Camps	2–18 Feb 2026	1,500	66.2	30.7; 31	23.9; 27	18.4; 20	18.9; 21	3.3; 0	–	1.3; 0	6.8
GfK/Compromís	9–19 Dec 2025	1,025	?	23.3; 24/25	21.7; 24/25	23.7; 25/26	24.4; 25/26	1.0; 0	0.4; 0	0.9; 0	0.7
PSPV	16 Sep–30 Oct 2025	1,812	?	? 27	? 30	? 20	? 22	2.0; 0	–	–	?
GAD3/ABC	13–22 Oct 2025	1,013	?	29.0; 33	25.2; 27	18.9; 19	19.4; 20	3.4; 0	–	–	3.8
Demoscopia y Servicios/ESdiario	3–7 Oct 2025	1,300	60.3	30.5; 34	27.2; 31	15.0; 16	17.4; 18	4.5; 0	–	2.8; 0	3.3
Lápiz Estratégico/Prensa Ibérica	22–26 Sep 2025	750	?	31.7; 34	30.7; 32	15.4; 16	16.5; 17	2.9; 0	–	–	1.0
Demoscopia y Servicios/ESdiario	30 Jun–2 Jul 2025	1,200	59.8	32.4; 36	28.7; 32	13.6; 14	15.2; 17	4.5; 0	–	3.2; 0	3.7
SyM Consulting	4–7 Jun 2025	2,314	64.1	36.1; 39/40	26.4; 28/30	15.3; 15/17	15.1; 14/15	2.3; 0	–	–	9.7
NC Report/La Razón	16–31 May 2025	450	62.9	? 34	? 29	? 19	? 17	–	–	–	?
PP	22 May 2025	?	?	? 32/33	? 30/31	? 17/18	? 18/19	–	–	–	?
Lápiz Estratégico/Prensa Ibérica	14–21 May 2025	750	?	31.3; 33	32.6; 35	15.0; 16	13.9; 15	2.0; 0	–	–	1.3
Demoscopia y Servicios/ESdiario	15–17 Apr 2025	1,200	61.0	33.1; 36/37	30.4; 33/34	13.3; 14	14.1; 15	4.2; 0	–	2.7; 0	2.7
Sigma Dos/El Mundo	10–20 Mar 2025	1,118	?	28.4; 32/34	26.2; 28/30	20.2; 19/21	15.2; 15/17	2.9; 0	–	2.3; 0	2.2
SyM Consulting	11–15 Mar 2025	2,267	63.9	35.4; 38/40	26.7; 28/31	15.1; 15/16	14.9; 15	2.9; 0	–	–	8.7
EM-Analytics/Electomanía	29 Jan–26 Feb 2025	1,450	?	23.3; 25	27.9; 29	22.0; 22	21.9; 23	2.5; 0	–	–	4.6
Sigma Dos/El Mundo	25 Nov–4 Dec 2024	1,202	?	25.4; 29/31	24.6; 28/30	21.4; 20/22	17.2; 18/20	3.3; 0	–	3.1; 0	0.8
Social Data/Grupo Viva	25–27 Nov 2024	1,000	?	25.8; 28/31	25.9; 27/30	19.0; 20/21	17.9; 19/22	2.3; 0	–	3.8; 0/3	0.1
40dB/Prisa	22–25 Nov 2024	800	?	30.2	29.3	14.7	16.4	3.6	–	–	0.9
EM-Analytics/Electomanía	2–16 Nov 2024	924	?	24.2; 25	30.0; 32	21.4; 22	19.9; 20	2.0; 0	–	–	5.8
SyM Consulting/EPDA	8–11 Nov 2024	2,267	59.5	30.9; 33/34	27.5; 31/32	16.6; 16	16.4; 17/18	3.5; 0	–	–	3.4
Demoscopia y Servicios/ESdiario	7–8 Nov 2024	1,200	65.0	32.3; 37	26.7; 28	15.0; 15	13.1; 14	4.1; 0	–	5.8; 5	5.6
EM-Analytics/Electomanía	29 Oct–8 Nov 2024	776	?	24.8; 25	29.5; 32	21.5; 22	19.3; 20	1.7; 0	–	–	4.7
EM-Analytics/Electomanía	29 Sep–27 Oct 2024	1,450	?	38.2; 41	30.4; 33	16.9; 16	10.2; 9	2.5; 0	–	–	7.8
Demoscopia y Servicios/ESdiario	2–5 Oct 2024	1,200	63.0	42.2; 47	28.8; 32	11.7; 12	9.1; 8	3.0; 0	–	3.3; 0	13.4
Lápiz Estratégico/Prensa Ibérica	23–30 Sep 2024	751	?	41.7; 46	31.3; 34	10.6; 11	8.2; 8	3.0; 0	1.8; 0	–	10.4
SocioMétrica/PP	23–27 Sep 2024	2,500	?	40.1; 44	29.3; 32	11.8; 11	11.2; 12	3.1; 0	–	–	10.8
NC Report/La Razón	13–17 Jul 2024	1,000	68.1	39.8; 44/45	29.3; 32	13.2; 13	9.8; 9/10	2.5; 0	–	3.1; 0	10.5
Data10/Okdiario	12–13 Jul 2024	1,500	?	40.7; 46	30.5; 33	11.4; 11	10.2; 9	3.4; 0	–	–	10.2
2024 EP election	9 Jun 2024	—N/a	52.0	35.9 (40)	31.5 (34)	(Note: Within Compromís–Sumar.)	11.5 (12)	3.0 (0)	7.7 (8)	5.8 (5)	4.4
Demoscopia y Servicios/ESdiario	20–22 Mar 2024	1,200	63.0	41.1; 46	26.8; 28	16.2; 16	10.2; 9	–	–	–	14.3
EM-Analytics/Electomanía	29 Jan–26 Feb 2024	1,450	?	35.8; 38	30.2; 33	16.7; 16	12.1; 12	1.5; 0	–	–	5.6
Demoscopia y Servicios/ESdiario	15–21 Dec 2023	1,200	63.0	40.8; 45	27.2; 29	15.8; 15	10.2; 10	–	–	–	13.6
SocioMétrica/PP	10–13 Oct 2023	2,500	?	? 43	? 33	? 11	? 12	–	–	–	?
Demoscopia y Servicios/ESdiario	6–7 Oct 2023	1,200	?	39.3; 42	28.1; 29	17.4; 17	11.3; 11	–	–	–	11.2
2023 general election	23 Jul 2023	—N/a	71.5	34.9 (36)	32.1 (33)		15.6 (16)		15.2 (14)	–	2.8
2023 regional election	28 May 2023	—N/a	67.0	35.7; 40	28.7; 31	14.5; 15	12.6; 13	3.6; 0	–	–	7.0

=== Voting preferences ===
The table below lists raw, unweighted voting preferences.

Polling firm/Commissioner	Fieldwork date	Sample size	PP	PSPV	Compromís	Vox	Podemos	Sumar	SALF	Question	X mark	Lead
CIS	7–31 Mar 2025	1,577	22.3	22.0	12.7	11.5	1.5	1.2	1.6	19.8	2.9	0.3
Social Data/Grupo Viva	25–27 Nov 2024	1,000	15.0	15.6	13.8	13.9	0.9	–	2.5	16.4	12.3	0.6
40dB/Prisa	22–25 Nov 2024	800	16.8	19.9	12.5	16.3	4.0	–	–	13.2	9.9	3.1
Lápiz Estratégico/Prensa Ibérica	23–30 Sep 2024	751	30.2	23.4	7.5	6.0	2.1	1.2	–	24.2	2.0	6.8
2024 EP election (Note: Does not include non-resident citizens.)	9 Jun 2024	—N/a	19.1	16.8		6.1	1.6	4.1	3.1	—N/a	46.3	2.3
2023 general election	23 Jul 2023	—N/a	25.5	23.4		11.4		11.1	–	—N/a	26.4	2.1
2023 regional election	28 May 2023	—N/a	24.1	19.3	9.8	8.5	2.4	–	–	—N/a	30.6	4.8

=== Victory preferences ===
The table below lists opinion polling on the victory preferences for each party in the event of a regional election taking place.

Polling firm/Commissioner	Fieldwork date	Sample size	PP	PSPV	Compromís	Vox	Podemos	Sumar	SALF	Other/ None	Question	Lead
Lápiz Estratégico/Prensa Ibérica	24–30 Sep 2025	900	27.3	21.6	10.0	9.2	2.2	–	–	–	–	5.7
Lápiz Estratégico/Prensa Ibérica	22–26 Sep 2025	750	21.6	22.8	12.3	12.0	2.3	0.5	0.4	–	–	1.2
Lápiz Estratégico/Prensa Ibérica	23–30 Sep 2024	751	30.2	23.8	7.5	5.9	2.5	1.1	–	1.2	27.7	6.4

=== Victory likelihood ===
The table below lists opinion polling on the perceived likelihood of victory for each party in the event of a regional election taking place.

Polling firm/Commissioner	Fieldwork date	Sample size	PP	PSPV	Compromís	Vox	Podemos	Sumar	Other/ None	Question	Lead	
Lápiz Estratégico/Prensa Ibérica	24–30 Sep 2025	900	47.0	18.7	1.6	3.1	0.1	–	–	–	–	28.3
Lápiz Estratégico/Prensa Ibérica	22–26 Sep 2025	750	32.7	18.7	2.9	4.3	0.8	–	–	–	14.0	
Lápiz Estratégico/Prensa Ibérica	23–30 Sep 2024	751	44.4	17.3	4.1	2.4	0.8	0.4	1.2	29.8	27.1	

=== Preferred President ===
The table below lists opinion polling on leader preferences to become president of the Valencian Government.

All candidates

Polling firm/Commissioner	Fieldwork date	Sample size								Other/ None/ Not care	Question	Lead
Polling firm/Commissioner	Fieldwork date	Sample size	Mazón PP	Catalá PP	Llorca PP	Puig PSPV	Morant PSPV	Baldoví Compromís	Llanos Vox	Other/ None/ Not care	Question	Lead
GfK/Compromís	9–19 Dec 2025	1,025	–	–	12.0	–	9.0	22.0	5.0	54.0		10.0
CIS (Note: Responses denoting a party's generic candidate are aggregated to that party's main candidate/leader at the time of the poll.)	7–31 Mar 2025	1,577	9.9	2.3	–	2.3	9.7	7.8	4.5	9.5	54.0	0.2

Mazón vs. Puig

Polling firm/Commissioner	Fieldwork date	Sample size			Other/ None/ Not care	Question	Lead
Polling firm/Commissioner	Fieldwork date	Sample size	Mazón PP	Puig PSPV	Other/ None/ Not care	Question	Lead
SocioMétrica/PP	10–13 Oct 2023	2,500	53.0	47.0	–	–	6.0

=== Predicted President ===
The table below lists opinion polling on the perceived likelihood for each leader to become president.

Polling firm/Commissioner	Fieldwork date	Sample size					Other/ None/ Not care	Question	Lead
Polling firm/Commissioner	Fieldwork date	Sample size	Mazón PP	Morant PSPV	Baldoví Compromís	Llanos Vox	Other/ None/ Not care	Question	Lead
Sigma Dos/El Mundo	10–20 Mar 2025	1,118	25.5	37.0	6.6	4.4	26.5		11.5

== Bibliography ==
- Ley 5/1983, de 30 de diciembre, del Consell (Law 5/1983). Official State Gazette (in Spanish). 30 December 1983 [version as of 23 March 2007]. BOE-A-1984-3460.
- Ley Orgánica 5/1985, de 19 de junio, del Régimen Electoral General (Organic Law 5/1985). Official State Gazette (in Spanish). 19 June 1985 [version as of 2 July 2026]. BOE-A-1985-11672.
- Ley 1/1987, de 31 de marzo, Electoral Valenciana (Law 1/1987). Official State Gazette (in Spanish). 31 March 1987 [version as of 6 April 1987]. BOE-A-1987-9636.
- Ley Orgánica 1/2006, de 10 de abril, de Reforma de la Ley Orgánica 5/1982, de 1 de julio, de Estatuto de Autonomía de la Comunidad Valenciana (Organic Law 1/2006). Official State Gazette (in Spanish). 10 April 2006 [version as of 28 December 2022]. BOE-A-1982-17235.
