= Government of Juanfran Pérez Llorca =

Government of the Valencian Community since 2025

- Government of the Valencian Community
- 2025–present
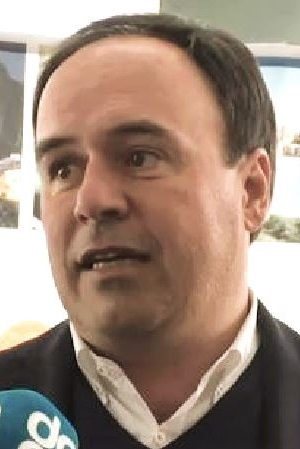
- Juanfran Pérez Llorca in January 2023.
- Date formed: 3 December 2025

People and organisations
- Monarch: Felipe VI
- President: Juanfran Pérez Llorca
- Vice President: Susana Camarero ^{(1st)} José Luís Díez Climent ^{(2nd)} Vicente Martínez ^{(3rd)}
- No. of ministers: 11 (Note: Does not include the President.)
- Total no. of members: 11
- Member party: PP
- Status in legislature: Minority (single-party)
- Opposition party: PSPV–PSOE

History
- Legislature term: 11th Corts
- Predecessor: Mazón

The government of Juanfran Pérez Llorca was formed on 3 December 2025, following the latter's election as president of the Valencian Government by the Corts Valencianes on 27 November and his swearing-in on 2 December, as a result of Carlos Mazón's resignation as regional president over criticism for his handling of the October 2024 floods. It succeeded the Mazón government and is the Valencian Government since 3 December 2025, a total of 36 days.

The cabinet comprised members of the People's Party (PP) and a number of independents.

== Investiture ==
Investiture; Juanfran Pérez Llorca (PP)
Ballot →	27 November 2025
Required majority →	50 out of 99
Yes: • PP (40); • Vox (13)	53 / 99
No: • PSPV (30); • Compromís (15)	45 / 99
Abstentions	0 / 99
Absentees: • PSPV (1)	1 / 99

== Council of Government ==
The Council of Government will be structured into the offices for the president, the two vice presidents, eleven ministries and the posts of secretary and spokesperson of the Council.

← Pérez Llorca Government → (3 December 2025 – present)
Portfolio	Name	Party	Took office	Left office	Ref.
President	Juanfran Pérez Llorca	PP	29 November 2025	Incumbent	
First Vice President; Minister of Housing, Employment, Youth and Equality	Susana Camarero	PP	3 December 2025	Incumbent	
Second Vice President; Minister of the Presidency; Secretary of the Council	José Luís Díez Climent	PP	3 December 2025	Incumbent	
Third Vice President; Minister of Environment, Infrastructures, Territory and of Recovery	Vicente Martínez	PP	3 December 2025	Incumbent	
Minister of Economy, Finance and Public Administration	José Antonio Rovira	PP	3 December 2025	Incumbent	
Minister of Health	Marciano Gómez	PP	3 December 2025	Incumbent	
Minister of Social Services, Family Affairs and Children	Elena Albalat	PP	3 December 2025	Incumbent	
Minister of Education, Culture and Universities	María del Carmen Ortiz Ferrer	Independent	3 December 2025	Incumbent	
Minister of Agriculture, Water, Livestock and Fisheries; Spokesperson of the Council	Miguel Barrachina	PP	3 December 2025	Incumbent	
Minister of Justice, Transparency and Participation	Nuria Martínez	Independent	3 December 2025	Incumbent	
Minister of Emergencies and Interior	Juan Carlos Valderrama	PP	3 December 2025	Incumbent	
Minister of Industry, Tourism, Innovation and Trade	Marián Cano	PP	3 December 2025	Incumbent	

== Notes ==
Preceded by Mazón	Valencian Government; TBC 2025	Incumbent
