= Government of Carlos Mazón =

Government of the Valencian Community between 2023 and 2025

- Government of the Valencian Community
- 2023–2025
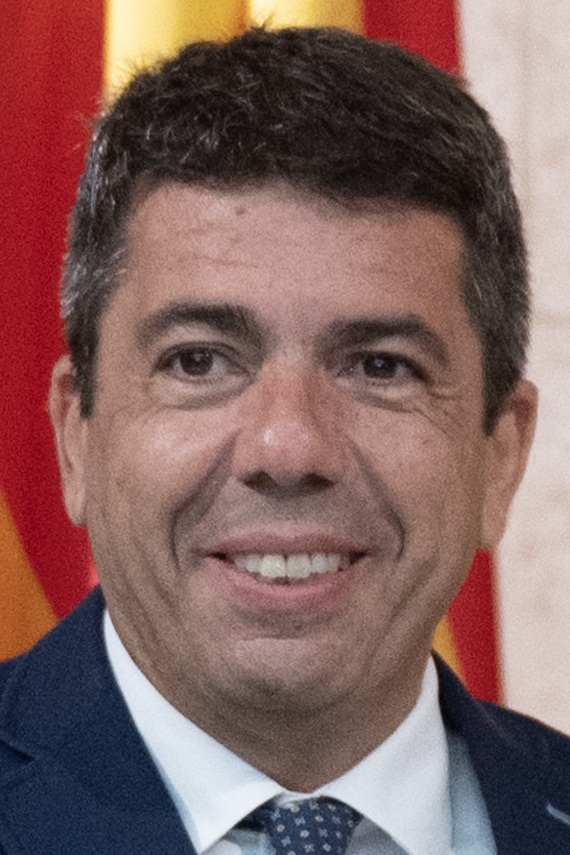
- Carlos Mazón in May 2025.
- Date formed: 19 July 2023
- Date dissolved: 3 December 2025

People and organisations
- Monarch: Felipe VI
- President: Carlos Mazón
- Vice President: Susana Camarero ^{(1st, 2nd)} Vicente Martínez ^{(2nd)} (2025); Francisco Gan Pampols ^{(2nd)} (2024–2025); Vicente Barrera ^{(1st)} (2023–2024)
- No. of ministers: 9 (Note: Does not include the President.) (2023–2024; 2025); 10 (2024–2025)
- Total no. of members: 15
- Member party: PP; Vox (2023–2024)
- Status in legislature: Majority (coalition) (2023–2024); Minority (single-party) (2024–2025)
- Opposition party: PSPV–PSOE
- Opposition leader: Ximo Puig (2023)

History
- Election: 2023 regional election
- Legislature term: 11th Corts
- Predecessor: Puig II
- Successor: Pérez Llorca

The government of Carlos Mazón was formed on 19 July 2023, following the latter's election as president of the Valencian Government by the Corts Valencianes on 13 July and his swearing-in on 17 July, as a result of the People's Party (PP) emerging as the largest parliamentary force at the 2023 regional election. It succeeded the second Puig government and was Valencian Government from 19 July 2023 to 3 December 2025, a total of 868 days, or 2 years, 4 months and 14 days.

Until 2024, the cabinet comprised members of the PP and Vox, as well as a number of independents proposed by the first party. On 11 July 2024, Vox leader Santiago Abascal forced the break up of all PP–Vox governments at the regional level over a national controversy regarding the distribution of unaccompanied migrant minors among the autonomous communities.

It was automatically dismissed on 7 November 2025 as a consequence of the Mazón's resignation as regional president over criticism for his handling of the October 2024 floods, but remained in acting capacity until the next government was sworn in.

== Investiture ==
Investiture; Carlos Mazón (PP)
Ballot →	13 July 2023
Required majority →	50 out of 99
Yes: • PP (40); • Vox (13)	53 / 99
No: • PSPV (31); • Compromís (15)	46 / 99
Abstentions	0 / 99
Absentees	0 / 99

== Cabinet changes ==
Mazón's government saw a number of cabinet changes during its tenure:

- On 11 July 2024, Vox leader Santiago Abascal announced that his party was breaking all of its regional governments with the People's Party (PP) as a result of the later agreeing to a nationwide distribution of unaccompanied migrant minors among the autonomous communities under its control. In the Valencian Community, this resulted in the immediate expulsion from government by president Mazón of Vice President and Culture and Sports minister Vicente Barrera, Justice and Interior minister Elisa Núñez and Agriculture, Livestock and Fisheries minister José Luis Aguirre. They were replaced by Susana Camarero—who became the sole vice president—Salomé Pradas as new Minister of Justice and Interior and Miguel Barrachina at the helm of the new Agriculture, Water, Livestock and Fisheries portfolio; concurrently, Vicente Martínez replaced Pradas as responsible of the Environment, Infrastructures and Territory portfolio, whereas the Culture ministry was abolished and its responsibilities integrated within the Education, Universities and Employment ministry.
- On 15 November 2024, following the 2024 Valencian floods that killed at least 221 in the province of Valencia, Mazón attempted to cast off calls for his resignation by announcing a cabinet reshuffle. This was materialized on 22 November, with Social Services, Equality and Housing minister Susana Camarero being promoted to first vice president and appointed as government spokesperson; a second vicepresidency for the Economic and Social Recovery of the Valencian Community being created with a military officer, Francisco José Gan Pampols, at its helm; the Interior portfolio being split from the Justice department—which also saw a change of minister from Salomé Pradas to Nuria Martínez and was attached the Public Administration competences—to create a new Emergencies ministry under Juan Carlos Valderrama; and Marián Cano becoming new minister of Innovation, Industry, Trade and Tourism following the dismissal of Nuria Montes.

== Council of Government ==
The Council of Government was structured into the offices for the president, the two vice presidents, nine ministries and the posts of secretary and spokesperson of the Council. From July 2024, the Council would include only one vice president. The number of ministries was increased to ten with the post of the second vice president being reestablished in November 2024, then reduced back to nine in November 2025.

← Mazón Government → (19 July 2023 – 3 December 2025)
Portfolio	Name	Party	Took office	Left office	Ref.
President	Carlos Mazón	PP	15 July 2023	29 November 2025	
First Vice President; Minister of Culture and Sports	Vicente Barrera	Vox	19 July 2023	11 July 2024	
Second Vice President; Minister of Social Services, Equality and Housing; Secretary of the Council	Susana Camarero	PP	19 July 2023	12 July 2024	
Minister of Finance, Economy and Public Administration; Spokesperson of the Council	Ruth Merino	Independent	19 July 2023	22 November 2024	
Minister of Justice and Interior	Elisa Núñez	Vox	19 July 2023	11 July 2024	
Minister of Health	Marciano Gómez	PP	19 July 2023	3 December 2025	
Minister of Education, Universities and Employment	José Antonio Rovira	PP	19 July 2023	12 July 2024	
Minister of Agriculture, Livestock and Fisheries	José Luis Aguirre	Vox	19 July 2023	11 July 2024	
Minister of Environment, Water, Infrastructures and Territory	Salomé Pradas	PP	19 July 2023	12 July 2024	
Minister of Innovation, Industry, Trade and Tourism	Nuria Montes	Independent	19 July 2023	22 November 2024	
=== Changes July 2024 ===
Portfolio	Name	Party	Took office	Left office	Ref.
~~Minister of Culture and Sports~~ (Note: On 12 July 2024, the ministries of Education, Universities and Employment, Agriculture, Livestock and Fisheries and Environment, Water, Infrastructures and Territory were reorganized as the Education, Culture, Universities and Employment, Agriculture, Water, Livestock and Fisheries and Environment, Infrastructures and Territory departments, respectively. Concurrently, the Culture and Sports department was disestablished, whereas the second vice president was promoted to the post of sole vice president.)	Disestablished on 12 July 2024.				
Vice President; Minister of Social Services, Equality and Housing; Secretary of the Council	Susana Camarero	PP	12 July 2024	22 November 2024	
Minister of Justice and Interior	Salomé Pradas	PP	12 July 2024	22 November 2024	
Minister of Education, Culture, Universities and Employment	José Antonio Rovira	PP	12 July 2024	3 December 2025	
Minister of Agriculture, Water, Livestock and Fisheries	Miguel Barrachina	PP	12 July 2024	3 December 2025	
Minister of Environment, Infrastructures and Territory	Vicente Martínez	PP	12 July 2024	4 November 2025	
=== Changes November 2024 ===
Portfolio	Name	Party	Took office	Left office	Ref.
First Vice President (Note: On 22 November 2024, the ministries of Finance, Economy and Public Administration and Justice and Interior were reorganized as the Finance and Economy and Justice and Public Administration departments, respectively. Concurrently, a second vice presidency for the Economic and Social Recovery of the Valencian Community and a ministry of Emergencies and Interior were established, with the Social Services, Equality and Housing ministry being renumbered from sole to first vice presidency status.); Minister of Social Services, Equality and Housing; Secretary and Spokesperson of the Council	Susana Camarero	PP	22 November 2024	3 December 2025	
Second Vice President; Minister for the Economic and Social Recovery of the Valencian Community	Francisco Gan Pampols	Military	22 November 2024	4 November 2025	
Minister of Finance and Economy	Ruth Merino	Independent	22 November 2024	3 December 2025	
Minister of Justice and Public Administration	Nuria Martínez	Independent	22 November 2024	3 December 2025	
Minister of Emergencies and Interior	Juan Carlos Valderrama	PP	22 November 2024	3 December 2025	
Minister of Innovation, Industry, Trade and Tourism	Marián Cano	PP	22 November 2024	3 December 2025	
=== Changes November 2025 ===
Portfolio	Name	Party	Took office	Left office	Ref.
Second Vice President; Minister for the Economic and Social Recovery of the Valencian Community and of Environment, Infrastructures and Territory	Vicente Martínez	PP	4 November 2025	3 December 2025	

== Departmental structure ==
Carlos Mazón's government was organised into several superior and governing units, whose number, powers and hierarchical structure varied depending on the ministerial department.

Office (Original name)	Portrait	Name	Took office	Left office	Alliance/party	Ref.
=== Presidency ===
Presidency (Presidencia de la Generalitat)		Carlos Mazón	15 July 2023	29 November 2025	PP	
=== First Vice Presidency ===
First Vice Presidency (Vicepresidencia Primera) (until 12 July 2024; from 22 November 2024) Vice Presidency (Vicepresidencia) (12 July – 22 November 2024)		Vicente Barrera	19 July 2023	11 July 2024	Vox	
First Vice Presidency (Vicepresidencia Primera) (until 12 July 2024; from 22 November 2024) Vice Presidency (Vicepresidencia) (12 July – 22 November 2024)		Susana Camarero	12 July 2024	3 December 2025	PP	
First Vice Presidency (Vicepresidencia Primera) (until 12 July 2024; from 22 November 2024) Vice Presidency (Vicepresidencia) (12 July – 22 November 2024)	See Ministry of Culture and Sports (19 July 2023 – 12 July 2024); See Ministry of Social Services, Equality and Housing (12 July 2024 – present)					
=== Second Vice Presidency ===
Second Vice Presidency (Vicepresidencia Segunda) (until 12 July 2024; from 22 November 2024)		Susana Camarero	19 July 2023	12 July 2024	PP	
Second Vice Presidency (Vicepresidencia Segunda) (until 12 July 2024; from 22 November 2024)		Francisco Gan Pampols	22 November 2024	4 November 2025	PP (Military)	
Second Vice Presidency (Vicepresidencia Segunda) (until 12 July 2024; from 22 November 2024)		Vicente Martínez	4 November 2025	3 December 2025	PP	
Second Vice Presidency (Vicepresidencia Segunda) (until 12 July 2024; from 22 November 2024)	See Ministry of Social Services, Equality and Housing (19 July 2023 – 12 July 2024); See Ministry for the Economic and Social Recovery of the Valencian Community (22 November 2024 – 4 November 2025); See Ministry for the Economic and Social Recovery of the Valencian Community and of Environment, Infrastructures and Territory (4 November 2025 – present)					
=== Ministry of Culture and Sports ===
Ministry of Culture and Sports (Conselleria de Cultura y Deporte) (until 12 July 2024)		Vicente Barrera	19 July 2023	11 July 2024	Vox	
=== Ministry of Social Services, Equality and Housing ===
Ministry of Social Services, Equality and Housing (Conselleria de Servicios Sociales, Igualdad y Vivienda)		Susana Camarero	19 July 2023	3 December 2025	PP	
=== Ministry for the Economic and Social Recovery of the Valencian Community ===
Ministry for the Economic and Social Recovery of the Valencian Community (Conselleria para la Recuperación; Económica y Social de la Comunitat Valenciana) (22 November 2024 – 4 November 2025) Ministry for the Economic and Social Recovery of the Valencian Community and of Environment, Infrastructures and Territory (Conselleria para la Recuperación; Económica y Social de la Comunitat; Valenciana y de Medio Ambiente, Infraestructuras y Territorio) (from 4 November 2025)		Francisco Gan Pampols	22 November 2024	4 November 2025	PP (Military)	
Ministry for the Economic and Social Recovery of the Valencian Community (Conselleria para la Recuperación; Económica y Social de la Comunitat Valenciana) (22 November 2024 – 4 November 2025) Ministry for the Economic and Social Recovery of the Valencian Community and of Environment, Infrastructures and Territory (Conselleria para la Recuperación; Económica y Social de la Comunitat; Valenciana y de Medio Ambiente, Infraestructuras y Territorio) (from 4 November 2025)		Vicente Martínez	4 November 2025	3 December 2025	PP	
=== Ministry of Finance and Economy ===
Ministry of Finance, Economy and Public Administration (Conselleria de Hacienda, Economía y Administración Pública) (until 22 November 2024) Ministry of Finance and Economy (Conselleria de Hacienda y Economía) (from 22 November 2024)		Ruth Merino	19 July 2023	3 December 2025	PP (Independent)	
=== Ministry of Justice ===
Ministry of Justice and Interior (Conselleria de Justicia e Interior) (until 22 November 2024) Ministry of Justice and Public Administration (Conselleria de Justicia y Administración Pública) (from 22 November 2024)		Elisa Núñez	19 July 2023	11 July 2024	Vox	
Ministry of Justice and Interior (Conselleria de Justicia e Interior) (until 22 November 2024) Ministry of Justice and Public Administration (Conselleria de Justicia y Administración Pública) (from 22 November 2024)		Salomé Pradas	12 July 2024	22 November 2024	PP	
Ministry of Justice and Interior (Conselleria de Justicia e Interior) (until 22 November 2024) Ministry of Justice and Public Administration (Conselleria de Justicia y Administración Pública) (from 22 November 2024)		Nuria Martínez	22 November 2024	3 December 2025	PP (Independent)	
=== Ministry of Emergencies ===
Ministry of Emergencies and Interior (Conselleria de Emergencias e Interior) (from 22 November 2024)		Juan Carlos Valderrama	22 November 2024	3 December 2025	PP	
=== Ministry of Health ===
Ministry of Health (Conselleria de Sanidad)		Marciano Gómez	19 July 2023	3 December 2025	PP	
=== Ministry of Education, Universities and Employment ===
Ministry of Education, Universities and Employment (Conselleria de Educación, Universidades y Empleo) (until 12 July 2024) Ministry of Education, Culture, Universities and Employment (Conselleria de Educación, Cultura, Universidades y Empleo) (from 12 July 2024)		José Antonio Rovira	19 July 2023	3 December 2025	PP	
=== Ministry of Agriculture, Livestock and Fisheries ===
Ministry of Agriculture, Livestock and Fisheries (Conselleria de Agricultura, Ganadería y Pesca) (until 12 July 2024) Ministry of Agriculture, Water, Livestock and Fisheries (Conselleria de Agricultura, Agua, Ganadería, y Pesca) (from 12 July 2024)		José Luis Aguirre	19 July 2023	11 July 2024	Vox	
Ministry of Agriculture, Livestock and Fisheries (Conselleria de Agricultura, Ganadería y Pesca) (until 12 July 2024) Ministry of Agriculture, Water, Livestock and Fisheries (Conselleria de Agricultura, Agua, Ganadería, y Pesca) (from 12 July 2024)		Miguel Barrachina	12 July 2024	3 December 2025	PP	
=== Ministry of Environment, Infrastructures and Territory ===
Ministry of Environment, Water, Infrastructures and Territory (Conselleria de Medio Ambiente, Agua, Infraestructuras y Territorio) (until 12 July 2024) Ministry of Environment, Infrastructures and Territory (Conselleria de Medio Ambiente, Infraestructuras y Territorio) (from 12 July 2024)		Salomé Pradas	19 July 2023	12 July 2024	PP	
Ministry of Environment, Water, Infrastructures and Territory (Conselleria de Medio Ambiente, Agua, Infraestructuras y Territorio) (until 12 July 2024) Ministry of Environment, Infrastructures and Territory (Conselleria de Medio Ambiente, Infraestructuras y Territorio) (from 12 July 2024)		Vicente Martínez	12 July 2024	4 November 2025	PP	
=== Ministry of Innovation, Industry, Trade and Tourism ===
Ministry of Innovation, Industry, Trade and Tourism (Conselleria de Innovación, Industria, Comercio y Turismo)		Nuria Montes	19 July 2023	22 November 2024	PP (Independent)	
Ministry of Innovation, Industry, Trade and Tourism (Conselleria de Innovación, Industria, Comercio y Turismo)		Marián Cano	22 November 2024	3 December 2025	PP	
=== Secretariat of the Council ===
Secretariat of the Council (Secretaría del Consell)		Susana Camarero	19 July 2023	3 December 2025	PP	
=== Spokesperson of the Council ===
Spokesperson of the Council (Portavoz del Consell)		Ruth Merino	19 July 2023	22 November 2024	PP (Independent)	
Spokesperson of the Council (Portavoz del Consell)		Susana Camarero	22 November 2024	3 December 2025	PP	

== Notes ==
Preceded by Puig II	Valencian Government; 2023–present	Succeeded by Pérez Llorca
