= Vicente Mompó =

Spanish politician

Vicente José Mompó Aledo
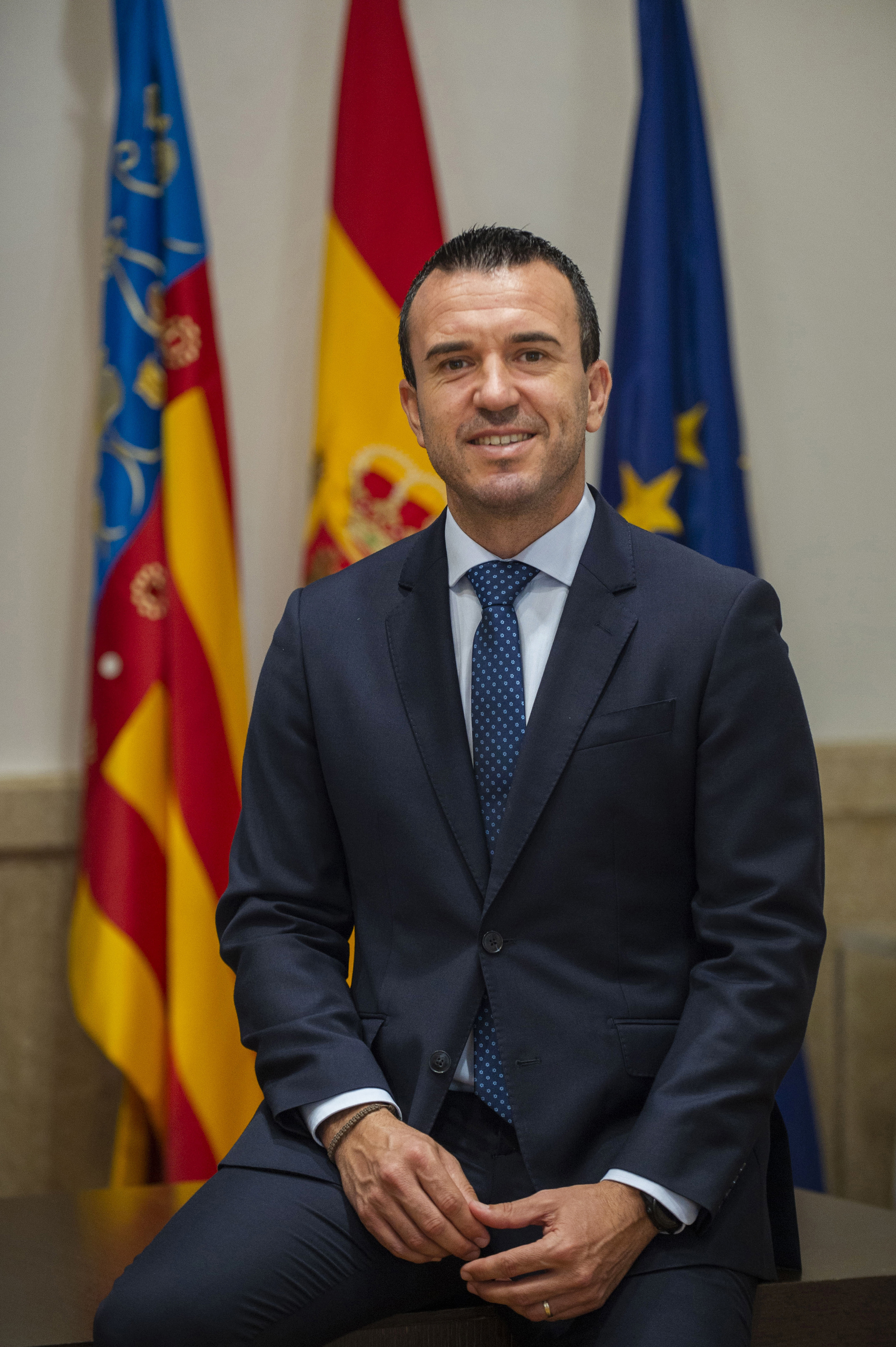
- Vicente Mompó, president of the Provincial Council of Valencia
- Born: 13 June 1981 (age 44); Gavarda, Province of Valencia, Spain
- Occupation: Politician
- Known for: President of the Provincial Council of Valencia

President of the Provincial Council of Valencia
- Incumbent
- Assumed office 11 July 2023
- Preceded by: Toni Gaspar

President of the People's Party of the Province of Valencia
- Incumbent
- Assumed office 25 July 2020
- Preceded by: Rubén Moreno Palanques

Mayor of Gavarda
- Incumbent
- Assumed office 11 June 2011
- Preceded by: Adela Martínez Corbí

Member of the Valencian Parliament
- In office 26 June 2023 – 27 July 2023
- Constituency: Valencia

Vicente José Mompó Aledo (born 13 June 1981) is a Spanish politician who has served as Mayor of Gavarda since 2011, president of the People’s Party (PP) in the Province of Valencia since 2020, and president of the Provincial Council of Valencia since July 2023.

== Biography ==
Mompó graduated in Physical Activity and Sports Sciences in 2005. He later entered the business sector as manager of Gestión Servicios Mompó Aledo S. L., a company he founded in 2014 that organised activity and events contracts.

== Political career ==
Mompó has served as Mayor of Gavarda since 2011. In 2019, he became a provincial deputy for Valencia representing the judicial district of Xàtiva. He later became spokesperson for the People’s Party group and leader of the opposition in the Provincial Council of Valencia. On 15 July 2020, he was elected president of the PP in the province. Following the 2023 Valencian regional election, he briefly served as a deputy in the Corts Valencianes.

On 1 November 2025, amid declining electoral prospects for regional president Carlos Mazón, the presidents of the three provincial councils and the PP’s regional secretary general, Juanfran Pérez Llorca, proposed Mompó to the national leadership as the future party leader and candidate for the next regional elections.

=== Presidency of the Provincial Council of Valencia ===
During the investiture session of the Provincial Council of Valencia held on 14 July 2023, Mompó was elected president in the second round of voting with 15 votes (13 from the People’s Party and 2 from Vox). His election was made possible when Natalia Enguix, candidate of Ens Uneix, voted for herself without the support of the opposition.
