= Bönig =

Bönig or Bonig is a German language surname and a variant of Böhning. Notable people with the name include:

- Isabel Bonig (born 1970), Spanish politician
- Philipp Bönig (born 1980), German former professional footballer
- Sebastian Bönig (born 1981), German football coach and former player
- Winfried Bönig (born 1959), German organist
