= Consell Valencià de Cultura =

Valencian Council of Culture

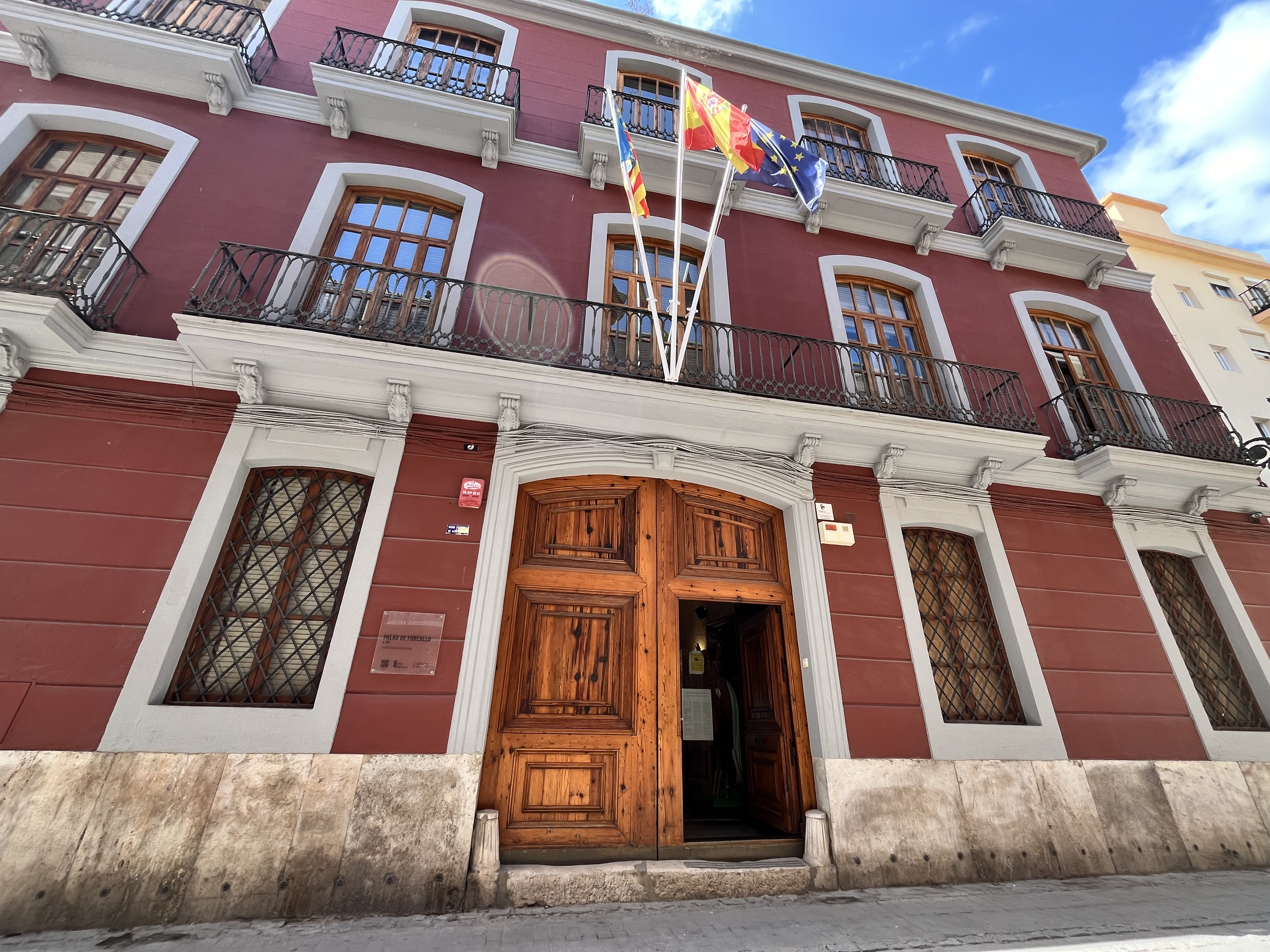
Forcalló Palace in Valencia, site of Valencian Council of Culture

Valencian Council of Culture (in Spanish Consejo Valenciano de Cultura, official name in Valencian, Consell Valencià de Cultura, referred as CVC) is a consultation and advisory institution for the Generalitat Valenciana for affairs related to Valencian culture. It is part of the Government of the Valencia Region Valencian Community It defends and promotes the region's cultural and linguistic values. The council's headquarters are located in the city of Valencia.

It was created in 1985 by a mandate in the regional constitution (Estatuto de Autonomía) of 1982 Statute of autonomy. The institution had as president (1995–2022) Santiago Grisolía, a Spanish scientist of international stature. Since April 2025 the president is the architect José María Lozano Velasco.

The CVC is the official body of the regional government in culture matters and recognition medals to prominent figures like Adela Cortina or the risks or overtourism.

== Bodies and functions ==
The Valencian Council of Culture is governed by collegiate and single-member bodies; their basic structure is as follows, as described in the official reglament:

- Governing bodies:
  - The Presidency
  - The Plenary Session
  - The Government Commission
- Information and working bodies:
  - Arts Commission
  - Science Commission
  - Legal and Regulatory Interpretation Commission
  - Historical and Artistic Legacy Commission
  - Cultural Promotion Commission

The president of the council is elected by the president of the Generalitat Valenciana, and its main function is representative.

The committees may be permanent or temporary.

The Plenary Session's functions are to draft the Organizational Regulations, approve its budgets and annual report, and issue the opinions and reports reserved for it by the Law of the Valencian Council of Culture, as well as propose candidates for renewal of the Council.

The Government Commission is responsible for implementing the agreements of the Council's Plenary Session and is composed of the President, a Secretary, and four Members, elected by the Plenary Session.

== See also ==
- Valencian Parliament
- Kingdom of Valencia
