= Nuria Martínez Sanchis =

Spanish politician

Minister of Justice and Public Administration of the Valencian Community
- Incumbent
- Assumed office 22 November 2024
- President: Carlos Mazón; Juanfran Pérez Llorca

Personal details
- Party: Independent

Nuria Martínez Sanchis is a Spanish politician serving as minister of justice and public administration of the Valencian Community since 2024. From 2018 to 2023, she served as dean of the faculty of legal, economic and social sciences at the Valencia Catholic University Saint Vincent Martyr.
