= Luis Rosado Bretón =

Spanish physician (born 1957)

Luis Rosado Bretón (Madrid, Spain, 1957) is a Spanish physician, intensivist, and politician.

== Biography ==
Degree in Medicine from the Complutense University of Madrid, where he specialized in Intensive Care Medicine and did his first internship at the Hospital General Universitario de Alicante in 1987. He later obtained a position at the Hospital de Villajoyosa (Marina Baja), where he became Deputy Director in 1995. During these years, he has also been Medical Director of the Hospital de San Juan de Alicante and then of the Hospital General Universitaria ("the same hospital where he began his professional career").

In 2007 he was appointed by the Regional Minister of Health, Manuel Cervera Taulet, as Regional Secretary of Health and went on to direct the Valencian Health Agency (AVS).

On June 22, 2011, after being appointed by Francisco Camps, he replaced Manuel Cervera at the head of the Regional Ministry.

Subsequently, on December 7, 2012, he left the position of counselor to be replaced by Manuel Llombart Fuertes after a reshuffle of the council executed by the next president of the Generalitat Alberto Fabra.

Since January 2013, he has been working as an internal doctor in a hospital in Alicante.

== Corruption ==
On December 3, 2013, he was charged by the High Court of Justice of the Valencian Community (TSJCV), linking him in the branch of the Gürtel Case for the alleged crimes of prevarication, influence peddling and falsification of public documents.
