= Vicente Barrera =

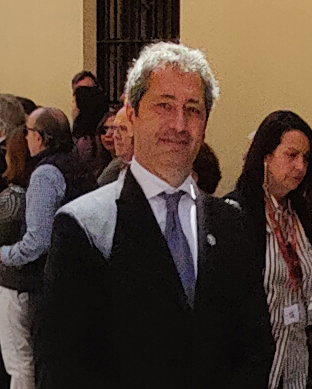

Vicente Barrera Simó (born 28 July 1968) is a Spanish politician of the party Vox. He was previously a bullfighter. He was vice president and Minister of Culture and Sport in the Generalitat Valenciana, in the government of Carlos Mazón, from July 2023 to July 2024.

== Early life ==
Born in Valencia, Barrera graduated with a law degree from the University of Valencia. He then became a bullfighter. He then moved into business interests in food production, restaurants, hotels and property.

== Political career ==
Barrera was previously a supporter of the People's Party (PP). He publicly announced his switch of support to Vox before the 2018 Andalusian regional election. He said that the last straw was the PP voting against the prohibition of the Basque nationalist party EH Bildu.

After the 2023 Valencian regional election, the PP formed a government with Vox. PP leader Carlos Mazón would not form a government including Vox leader Carlos Flores due to the latter's conviction for domestic abuse, so Barrera was named as vice president and Minister of Culture. El Confidencial published that he was still director of seven businesses in the fields of property, wine and seafood, a conflict of interest with his office; he did not make a public speech for the first two months of his tenure.

In his budget in November 2023, Barrera designated €300,000 for the Fundación del Toro de Lidia, a bullfighting organisation in Madrid; he defended the donation to a body in another autonomous community. He also financed Lo Rat Penat and the Royal Academy of Valencian Culture, organisations that believe in using different norms in Valencian than in Catalan, while cutting aid to organisations he deemed to promote the concept of the Catalan Countries.

In July 2024, Vox's national leader Santiago Abascal ordered the regional leaders to resign from PP-led governments in a row over the other party's stance on migration. Mazón fired his Vox ministers, including Barrera, and governed in minority. Both Mazón and Barrera praised each other on a professional and personal level. Barrera said that both his appointment and dismissal were unexpected.

In October 2024, Vox's leadership appointed Barrera to train members of their party.
