= Isabel Bonig =

Spanish politician and lawyer

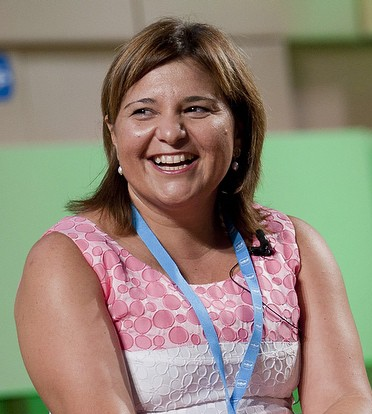

Leader of the People's Party of the Valencian Community
- In office 28 July 2015 – 2021
- Preceded by: Alberto Fabra
- Succeeded by: Carlos Mazón

Personal details
- Born: 25 February 1970 (age 56) Castellón de la Plana, Spain
- Party: PPCV
- Education: Jaume I University
- Occupation: Politician

Isabel Plácida Bonig Trigueros (pronounced [izaˈbɛl ˈplasiða boˈnitʃ i triˈɣeɾos]; Castellón de la Plana, born 25 February 1970) is a Spanish politician and lawyer who belongs to the People's Party (Partido Popular) and lawyer She was the mayor of the municipality of La Vall d'Uixó near Castellón between 2007 and 2011, and the Minister of Infrastructure, Territory and Environment of the Generalitat Valenciana between 2011 and 2015. She is, since July 28, 2015, President of the Popular Party of the Valencian Community. She is married and has no children.

== Biography ==
She graduated in law from the Universidad Jaime I in her home town of Castellón de la Plana, where she obtained the extraordinary end-of-course prize, and is a lawyer. She comes from a family in the province of Castellón.
