= José María Llanos =

Spanish politician, educator and lawyer

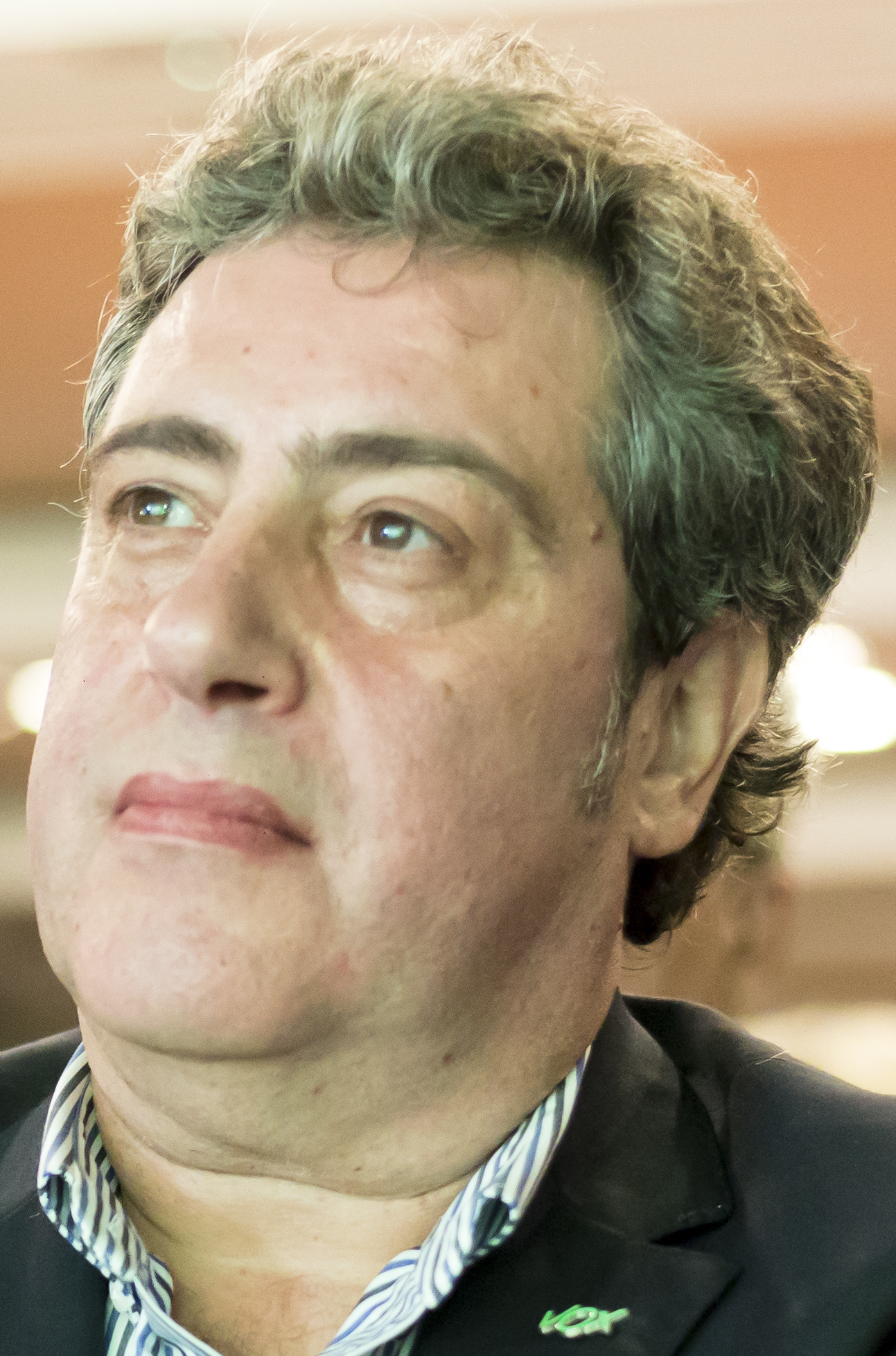

Member of the Corts Valencianes
- Incumbent
- Assumed office 28 April 2019

Personal details
- Born: José María Llanos Pitarch
- Political party: Vox
- Occupation: Politician, teacher and lawyer

José María Llanos Pitarch is a Spanish politician, educator and lawyer who is the president of the Vox party in the Valencia region of Spain and a member of the Corts Valencianes since 2019 representing the Valencia constituency.

Llanos studied political sciences at the University of Valencia followed by a PhD in law. He subsequently worked as a magistrate at the Provincial Court of Valencia and has been a professor of Roman Law at the University of Valencia since 1989. He has been a member of the ultra-Catholic association HazteOir. In 2019, he was elected as Vox's lead candidate to the Corts Valencianes.

Llanos has spoken in support of abolishing the Spanish gender violence act during his election campaign, arguing in an interview with BBC Newsnight that "the (current) law on gender violence persecutes and criminalises the male for being born male." Llanos also calls for NGOs who pick up migrants in the Mediterranean to be charged with human smuggling and supports deploying the Spanish navy to combat human traffickers.
