= Susana Camarero =

Spanish politician

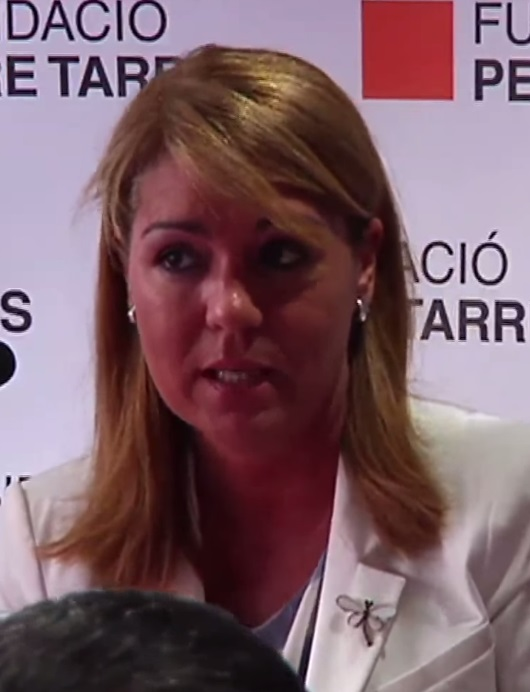
Camarero in 2015

Susana Camarero Benítez (born 25 April 1970) is a Spanish politician who belongs to the People's Party (PP) where she serves on the national executive.

Camarero qualified in law. She entered politics in 1995 when she was elected to the Valencian regional parliament. She resigned from that body five years later when she was elected to the Spanish Congress of Deputies representing Valencia region. She was re-elected in 2004 and 2008. She has sat on various committees including defense, economy & manufacturing and public administration as well as the commission for woman's rights and equality.
