= President of the Valencian Government =

Spanish autonomous community head

- President de la Generalitat Valenciana
- Flag of the Valencian Community

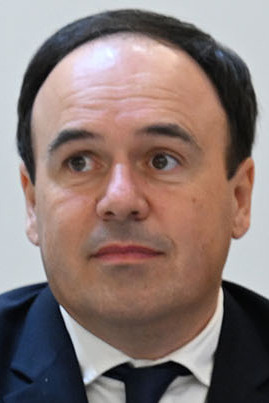
- Incumbent; Juanfran Pérez Llorca since 29 November 2025
- Nominator: Corts Valencianes
- Appointer: The Monarch; countersigned by the Prime Minister
- Inaugural holder: José Lluis Albiñana
- Formation: 10 April 1978
- Website: www.presidencia.gva.es

The president of the Valencian Government (Valencian: President de la Generalitat Valenciana) is the head of the Generalitat Valenciana, the government of the Spanish autonomous community of Valencia. The president is chosen by the Valencian parliament, the Corts Valencianes.

== Election ==
Under Article 27 of the regional Statute of Autonomy, investiture processes to elect the president of the Valencian Government require of an absolute majority—more than half the votes cast—to be obtained in the first ballot in the Corts Valencianes. If unsuccessful, a new ballot will be held 48 hours later requiring only of a simple majority—more affirmative than negative votes—to succeed. If the proposed candidate is not elected, successive proposals are to be transacted under the same procedure. In the event of the investiture process failing to elect a regional president within a two-month period from the first ballot, the Parliament shall be automatically dissolved and a fresh election called.

Before 2006, the election of the regional president was regulated under Article 15. Until then, the Statute allowed for multiple candidates to be voted, with the one securing the absolute majority in the first ballot, or a simple majority in the second one to be held 48 hours later, being elected to the office.

== List of officeholders ==
Governments:

- UCD
- PSOE
- PP
- Mixed coalition

Portrait	Name (Birth–Death)	Term of office			Party	Government Composition	Election	Monarch (Reign)	Ref.
Portrait	Name (Birth–Death)	Took office	Left office	Duration	Party	Government Composition	Election	Monarch (Reign)	Ref.
	José Lluis Albiñana (born 1943)	10 April 1978	30 June 1979	1 year, 256 days	PSOE	Albiñana I PSOE–UCD–AP–PSP– USPV–PCE	N/A	King; Juan Carlos I (1975–2014)	
	José Lluis Albiñana (born 1943)	30 June 1979	22 December 1979	1 year, 256 days	PSOE	Albiñana II; PSOE–UCD–PCE	N/A	King; Juan Carlos I (1975–2014)	
	Enrique Monsonís (1931–2011)	22 December 1979	15 September 1981	2 years, 339 days	UCD	Monsonís I UCD	N/A	King; Juan Carlos I (1975–2014)	
	Enrique Monsonís (1931–2011)	15 September 1981	11 August 1982	2 years, 339 days	UCD	Monsonís II; UCD	N/A	King; Juan Carlos I (1975–2014)	
	Enrique Monsonís (1931–2011)	11 August 1982	26 November 1982	2 years, 339 days	UCD	Monsonís III; UCD–PSOE–PCE	N/A	King; Juan Carlos I (1975–2014)	
	Joan Lerma (born 1951)	26 November 1982	25 June 1983	12 years, 219 days	PSOE	Lerma I PSOE–UCD–PCE	N/A	King; Juan Carlos I (1975–2014)	
	Joan Lerma (born 1951)	25 June 1983	23 July 1987	12 years, 219 days	PSOE	Lerma II; PSOE	1983	King; Juan Carlos I (1975–2014)	
	Joan Lerma (born 1951)	23 July 1987	12 July 1991	12 years, 219 days	PSOE	Lerma III; PSOE	1987	King; Juan Carlos I (1975–2014)	
	Joan Lerma (born 1951)	12 July 1991	3 July 1995	12 years, 219 days	PSOE	Lerma IV; PSOE	1991	King; Juan Carlos I (1975–2014)	
	Eduardo Zaplana (born 1956)	3 July 1995	20 July 1999	7 years, 6 days	PP	Zaplana I PP–UV	1995	King; Juan Carlos I (1975–2014)	
	Eduardo Zaplana (born 1956)	20 July 1999	9 July 2002 (resigned)	7 years, 6 days	PP	Zaplana II; PP	1999	King; Juan Carlos I (1975–2014)	
During this interval, First Vice President José Luis Olivas served as acting officeholder.						Zaplana II; PP	1999	King; Juan Carlos I (1975–2014)	
	José Luis Olivas (1952–2025)	24 July 2002	20 June 2003	331 days	PP	Olivas; PP	1999	King; Juan Carlos I (1975–2014)	
	Francisco Camps (born 1962)	20 June 2003	27 June 2007	8 years, 30 days	PP	Camps I PP	2003	King; Juan Carlos I (1975–2014)	
	Francisco Camps (born 1962)	27 June 2007	18 June 2011	8 years, 30 days	PP	Camps II; PP	2007	King; Juan Carlos I (1975–2014)	
	Francisco Camps (born 1962)	18 June 2011	21 July 2011 (resigned)	8 years, 30 days	PP	Camps III; PP	2011	King; Juan Carlos I (1975–2014)	
During this interval, Vice President Paula Sánchez de León served as acting officeholder.						Camps III; PP	2011	King; Juan Carlos I (1975–2014)	
	Alberto Fabra (born 1964)	28 July 2011	27 June 2015	3 years, 334 days	PP	Fabra; PP	2011	King; Juan Carlos I (1975–2014)	
	Alberto Fabra (born 1964)	28 July 2011	27 June 2015	3 years, 334 days	PP	Fabra; PP	2011	King; Felipe VI (2014–present)	
	Ximo Puig (born 1959)	27 June 2015	15 June 2019	8 years, 18 days	PSPV–PSOE	Puig I PSOE–Compromís	2015	King; Felipe VI (2014–present)	
	Ximo Puig (born 1959)	15 June 2019	15 July 2023	8 years, 18 days	PSPV–PSOE	Puig II; PSOE–Compromís–UP	2019	King; Felipe VI (2014–present)	
	Carlos Mazón (born 1974)	15 July 2023	29 November 2025 (resigned)	2 years, 137 days	PP	Mazón; PP–Vox until Jul 2024; PP from Jul 2024	2023	King; Felipe VI (2014–present)	
	Juanfran Pérez Llorca (born 1976)	29 November 2025	Incumbent	330 days	PP	Pérez Llorca; PP	2023	King; Felipe VI (2014–present)	
