= Palace of the Borgias =

Coordinates: 39°28′40.25″N 0°22′28.7″W

Palace of Benicarló
- Palau de les Corts Valencianes, Palau de Benicarló, Palau dels Borja (Catalan)
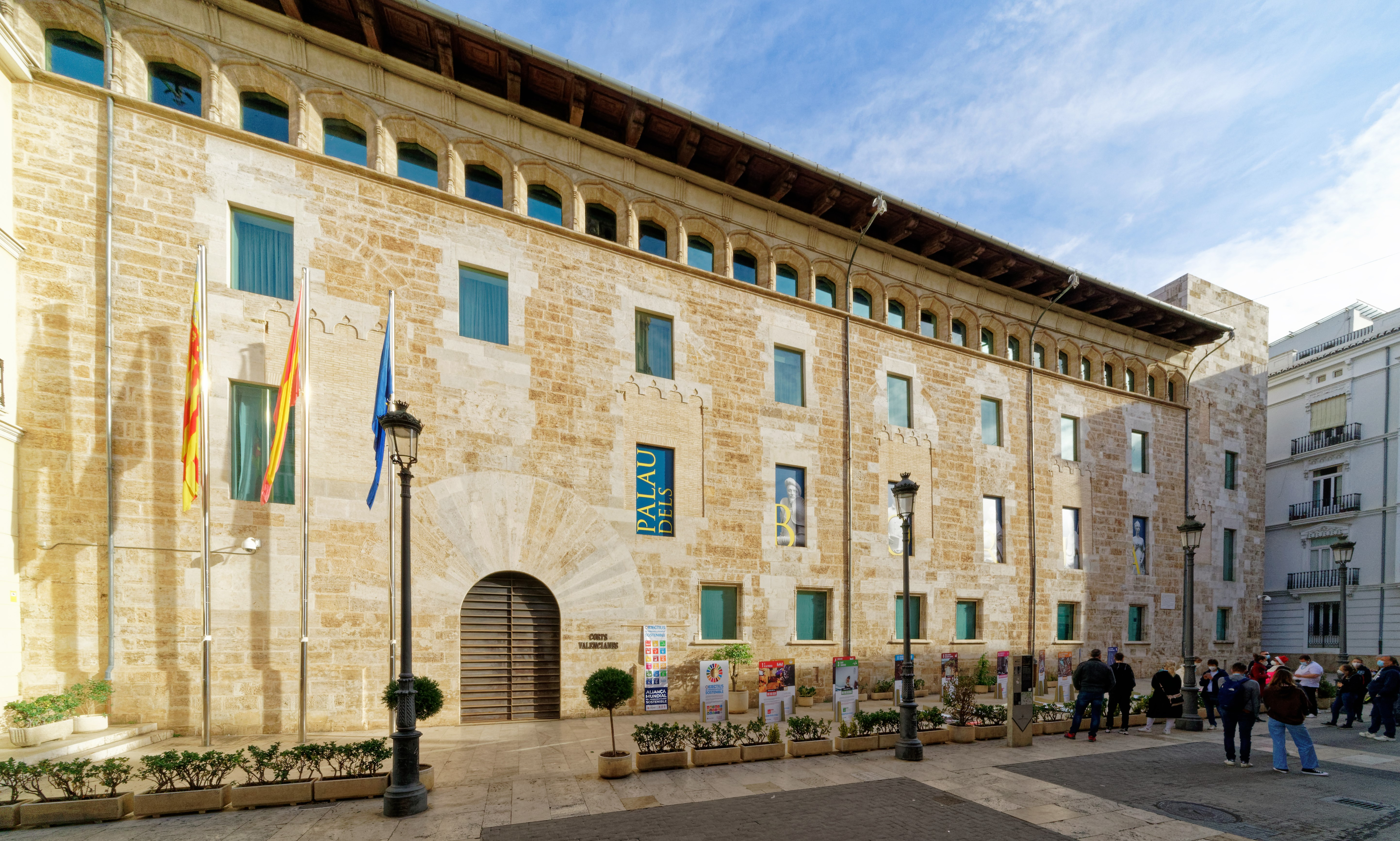
- Interactive map of Palace of Benicarló
- Location: Valencia

History
- Built: 15th century
- Built for: House of Borgia

Site notes
- Architectural styles: Valencian Gothic and Renaissance

Spanish Cultural Heritage
- Official name: Palau de les Corts Valencianes
- Type: Non-movable
- Criteria: Monument
- Designated: 1931

The Palace of Benicarló (officially and in Valencian, Palau de Benicarló, also commonly known as Palau de les Corts Valencianes or Palau dels Borja) is an aristocratic palace of Valencian Gothic and Renaissance styles located in the city of Valencia, Spain. It is now the headquarters of the Valencian Parliament.

The palace was constructed in the 15th century to be the residence of the Borgia family in the capital of the Kingdom of Valencia. The current name honours Joan Pérez de Sanmillán, the Marquis of Benicarló, a Valencian coastal town.

== See also ==
- Valencian Parliament
- House of Borgia
- Route of the Borgias
