= Böhning =

Böhning is a German-language surname. Notable people with the surname include:

- Björn Böhning (born 1978), German politician
- Hans Böhning (1893–1934), German World War I flying ace
