= Miguel Barrachina =

Spanish politician (born 1969)

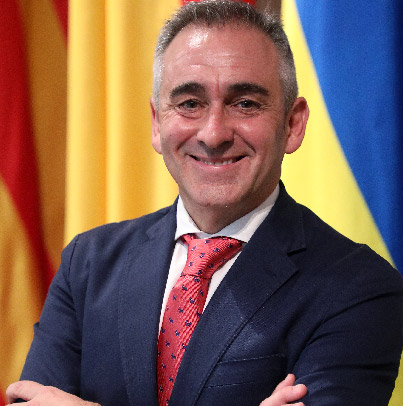
- Barrachina in 2024

Member of the Congress of Deputies
- In office 13 January 2016 – 21 May 2019
- Constituency: Castellón
- In office 2 April 2004 – 27 September 2011
- Constituency: Castellón

Personal details
- Born: 30 January 1969 (age 57)
- Party: People's Party

Miguel Barrachina Ros (born 30 January 1969) is a Spanish politician serving as minister of agriculture, water, livestock and fisheries of the Valencian Community since 2024. He was a member of the Congress of Deputies from 2004 to 2011 and from 2016 to 2019.
