= Generalitat Valenciana =

Set of self-governing institutions of the Valencian community

- Logo

Agency overview
- Formed: 1238 (Corts forals valencianes); 1418 (Diputació General); 1978 (Consell del País Valencià); 1982 (Generalitat Valenciana)
- Jurisdiction: Valencian Community
- Headquarters: Palau de la Generalitat Valenciana
- Employees: 228,453 (2010)
- Minister responsible: President of the Valencian Government, Juanfran Pérez Llorca

The Generalitat Valenciana (Note: Valencian pronunciation: [dʒeneɾaliˈtad valensiˈana]) is the generic name covering the different self-government institutions under which the Spanish autonomous community of Valencia is politically organized.

It consists of seven institutions including the Corts Valencianes (or autonomous Parliament), the President of the Generalitat, or the autonomous government itself (or Consell). Its functions are regulated by the Valencian Statute of Autonomy. Despite being also present in various cities of the Valencian Community, the main locations of the autonomous Parliament, presidency of the Generalitat and the Consell are all in the city of Valencia. There is also an office in Brussels appointed by the Generalitat Valenciana lobbying before the European Union.

== President of the Generalitat ==
The current President of the Generalitat Valenciana is Juanfran Pérez Llorca of the People's Party of the Valencian Community. He assumed the Presidency in November 2025.

== History ==
The Generalitat Valenciana was created in 1418. It acted, along with the Monarch shared with the other territories of the Crown of Aragon, as the ruling body of the Kingdom of Valencia. Originally its posts were designated for three year terms. In 1510, the process of designating posts was reorganized, becoming more automatic and less elective. This re-organization stayed the same until 1709, when it was abolished as a consequence of the War of the Spanish Succession and the subsequent Nueva Planta decrees, along with the other fueros of the Kingdom of Valencia.

The Generalitat Valenciana was not re-established until 1982, after the corresponding Valencian Statute of Autonomy was approved.

== El Consell ==
El Consell consists of eight members, each the leader of an institution. These institutions are:

Education, Culture, and Sports
in charge of education, formal training, universities, sciences, promotion of cultural heritage, language policy, and sports.
Treasury and Public Administrations
responsible for finance, the Valencian business sector, public service, and information technology and management communication.

Health
responsible for health services and public health.

Planning and Environment
responsible for public works, land and coastline planning, housing and building quality, transportation, ports and airports, environment, landscape, and climate change.

Social Welfare
responsible for policies affecting social services, dependence, the disabled, family, children, adoptions, youth, women, and immigration.

Government and Justice
responsible for civil protection, management of the National Police assigned to Valencia, prevention and extinction of fires, management of emergency situations, statutory development, consultations, professional associations, and notarial records.

Economics, Industry, and Employment
in charge of the economy, business sector, agriculture, industry, craftsmanship, domestic and foreign trade, consumerism, and investigation and innovation of technology and energy.

Agriculture, Fishing, Food and Water
responsible for establishing and maintaining relations with other countries of the European Union, other Autonomous Communities, local administrations, and citizens.

== Institutions ==
La Generalitat Valenciana comprises seven institutions:

- Les Corts
- Consell Valencià de Cultura
- Comité Econòmic i Social
- Sindicatura de Comptes
- Acadèmia Valenciana de la Llengua
- Síndic de Greuges
- Consell Jurídic Consultiu

=== Les Corts Valencianes ===
The Corts Valencianes is the Valencian Parliament. It represents the people of Valencia via the members of parliament. These members are elected using a universal, direct, free, and secret vote. It is made up of 75-100 members, which are determined by the Statute of Autonomy and through the voting process. The Statute of Autonomy also requires any candidate running for a Seat must "stand for a party or coalition that obtains more than 5% of the given votes in all the Autonomous Community." The D'Hondt method is used to distribute Seats. In the VIII Term, 35 members of Parliament were elected in the Alicante district, 24 members in the Castellon district, and 40 in the Valencia district.

The Statute of Autonomy dedicates Chapter II of Title III to the Valencian Parliament, which only outlines the composition of the Parliament, the basic principles of the election system, their corresponding duties, and sets out a general outline of the Statute of the Members of Parliament. The Valencian Parliament Regulations were developed in addition to the Statute of Autonomy to govern the organization and functioning of this Institution. On March 4, 1983, the first draft of the Valencian Parliament Regulations was approved during the Transitional Phase. Since then, it has undergone several modifications, which were approved by the Valencian Parliament on December 18, 2006. The contemporary Corts Valencianes differs from its historical counterpart of the same name. The former Corts Valencianes was organized into three arms – Ecclesiastic, Military, and Royal – which had different duties than the Corts today.

=== Consell Valencià de Cultura ===
The Consell Valencià de Cultura (Valencian Council of Culture) is a consultation and advisory institution for the Generalitat Valenciana for affairs related to Valencian culture. It defends and promotes the region's cultural and linguistic values. The Council's headquarters are located in the city of Valencia, but has also held sessions in Valencian municipal centers such as Castelló de la Plana, Alacant, Morella, Elx, and Vilafamés.

=== Comité Econòmic i Social ===
The Economic and Social Committee is a body of the government that provides consultations on economic, social, labor, and employment matters. It is also a part of the public institutions of Valencia.

=== Sindicatura de Comptes ===
The Sindicatura de Comptes, or Audit Office in English, is responsible for the external audit of the economic and financial activity of the public sector in the Valencian Community. This institution of the Generalitat reports to the Corts Valencianes, or Valencian Parliament, but maintains functional independence.

=== Acadèmia Valenciana de la Llengua ===
The Acadèmia Valenciana de la Llengua, or Valencian Academy of Language, was founded in 1998. It is the official governing body over the native language of the region, Valencian. Like the Sindicatura de Comptes, this institution maintains functional independence but works under the Corts Valencianes. The institution's purpose is to define and draw up linguistic rules and safeguard the Valencian language on the basis of its lexicographic and literary tradition and its actual linguistic reality, as well as the established Normes de Castelló (Castello Norms) that were approved in 1932.

=== Síndic de Greuges ===
The Ombudsman of the Valencian Region was established through Ley 11/1988. This office defend the fundamental rights and public freedoms recognized in the Spanish Constitution and Valencian Statute of Autonomy. The ombudsman is elected for a period of five years and may be re-elected.

=== Consell Jurídic Consultiu ===
The Legal Advisory Council of the Valencian government is the supreme branch of the Consell, Regional Administration, and local governments that consults in legal matters.

== Publications ==
Diari Oficial de la Generalitat Valenciana (DOGV) is the official publications in which the laws and norms of the Valencian Community are published. It is currently published every business day, in both official languages.

It was originally established as Boletín Oficial del Consell del País Valenciano (BO del CPV) on 3 May 1978. In 1982, it was renamed Diari Oficial de la Generalitat Valenciana (DOGV) on 15 July 1982 (issue 74).

On 15 December 2006, the publication was renamed Diari Oficial de la Comunitat Valenciana (DOCV), and switched from print to electronic format. It returned to name Diari Oficial de la Generalitat Valenciana (DOGV) on 7 October 2016.

== Debt of the Generalitat ==
In 2014, the government will try to enforce privatizations to try to stop the debt and balance the debt of the Generalitat. To lower debt, the Consell will sell assets and outsource waste treatment plants, sewage treatment plants, housing, and infrastructure as a means to generate income. The goal is to raise $300 million to address its problems, primarily to pay off the debts of the Generalitat, which is one of the departments that went over budget. The Generalitat is the third department to go over budget, after Sanitation and Education. Money to some departments, such as education, will be reduced. Other departments' budgets, such as Justice and Social Welfare, will receive a slight increase.

== See also ==
- Valencian Parliament
- Kingdom of Valencia
- Furs of Valencia
- Palace of the Borgias
