= Alberto Fabra =

Spanish politician

The Right Honourable Alberto Fabra
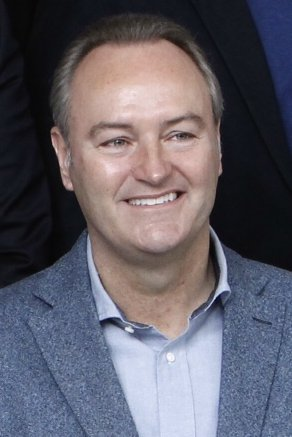

President of the Valencian Government
- In office 28 July 2011 – 25 June 2015
- Monarchs: Juan Carlos I Felipe VI
- Preceded by: Francisco Camps
- Succeeded by: Ximo Puig

Personal details
- Born: 6 April 1964 (age 62) Castellón de la Plana, Valencian Community, Spain
- Party: PPCV
- Spouse: Cristina Fortanet
- Children: 2
- Education: Polytechnic University of Valencia
- Occupation: Technical Architect, Politician

Alberto Fabra Part (Castellón de la Plana, born 6 April 1964) is a Spanish politician who belongs to the People's Party. He was the fifth President of the Valencian Government since devolution was granted in 1982.

== Personal life ==
He graduated in technical architecture at the Polytechnic University of Valencia in 1987.

He is married to Cristina Fortanet and has two children. He has denied being a cousin of the former President of the provincial Council of Castellón, Carlos Fabra.

On 23 March 2020, during COVID-19 pandemic in Spain, Fabra was admitted to an intensive care unit after testing positive for COVID-19.

== Political career ==
He had his first political office in 1991, when he was elected Councillor of the city of Castellón de la Plana. In 1993 he became Councillor for youth and environment and, in 1999, he was appointed Councillor for urban planning. In 2005, he was appointed Mayor of the city, after José Luis Gimeno resigned. Fabra held the position in the municipal elections of 2007 and 2011 (elections in which he was also elected to the Corts Valencianes). In 2009, he was appointed coordinator of the People's Party in the Valencian Community.

He was elected to the 15th Congress of Deputies from Castellón in the 2023 Spanish general election.

== President of the Government ==
On 20 July 2011, when Francisco Camps resigned, he was appointed President of the Valencian Government.
