= Juanfran Pérez Llorca =

Spanish politician (born 1976)

The Most Excellent Juanfran Pérez Llorca
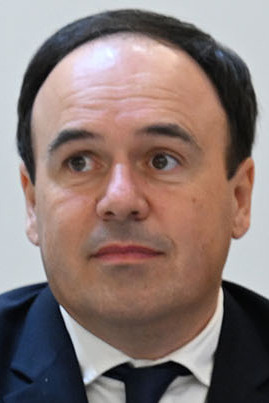
- Pérez Llorca in 2025

President of the Valencian Community
- Incumbent
- Assumed office 29 November 2025
- Monarch: Felipe VI
- Preceded by: Carlos Mazón

Member of the Corts Valencianes
- Incumbent
- Assumed office 28 June 2023
- Constituency: Alicante

Personal details
- Born: 1976 (age 49–50)
- Party: People's Party

Juan Francisco "Juanfran" Pérez Llorca (Valencian: [ˈxwaɱfɾam ˈpeɾez ˈʎoɾka]; born 1976) is a Spanish politician serving as president of the Valencian Government since November 2025 and as a member of the Corts Valencianes since 2023. He has served as secretary general of the People's Party of the Valencian Community since 2023, and as spokesperson of its group in the Corts since 2024. He served as mayor of Finestrat from 2015 to 2025.

== Political career ==
Pérez Llorca joined the People's Party (PP) in 2003 when running for election to the council in Finestrat in the Province of Alicante. He was elected to the council with his party in opposition, forming government in 2007 after breaking the hegemony of the Spanish Socialist Workers' Party (PSOE). He spent eight years in charge of urban planning in the government of mayor Honorato Algado.

For the 2023 Valencian regional election, Pérez Llorca was third on the PP list in the Alicante constituency. He was elected as his party came first with 15 out of 35 seats in the constituency. In July 2024, he succeeded Miguel Barrachina as his party's spokesperson in the Corts Valencianes.

In August 2023, Pérez Llorca went from vice secretary of organisation of the People's Party of the Valencian Community (PPCV) to secretary general, the second highest position in the party. He replaced María José Catalá, the mayor of Valencia. In July 2025, he was appointed to the Executive Committee of the PP by its national leader Alberto Núñez Feijóo.

=== President of the Valencian Government ===
In November 2025, Carlos Mazón announced his resignation as President of the Valencian Government due to criticism since the 2024 Spanish floods. Pérez Llorca was nominated as his successor, with the support of the Valencian PP and the designation of the national body. On 27 November, the regional parliament elected him as president, with Vox also voting in favour. The following day, he resigned as mayor and councillor in Finestrat, to be succeeded by Nati Algado. On 2 December, in his first speech as president, he apologised to the victims of the floods.
