= Carlos Mazón =

Spanish politician

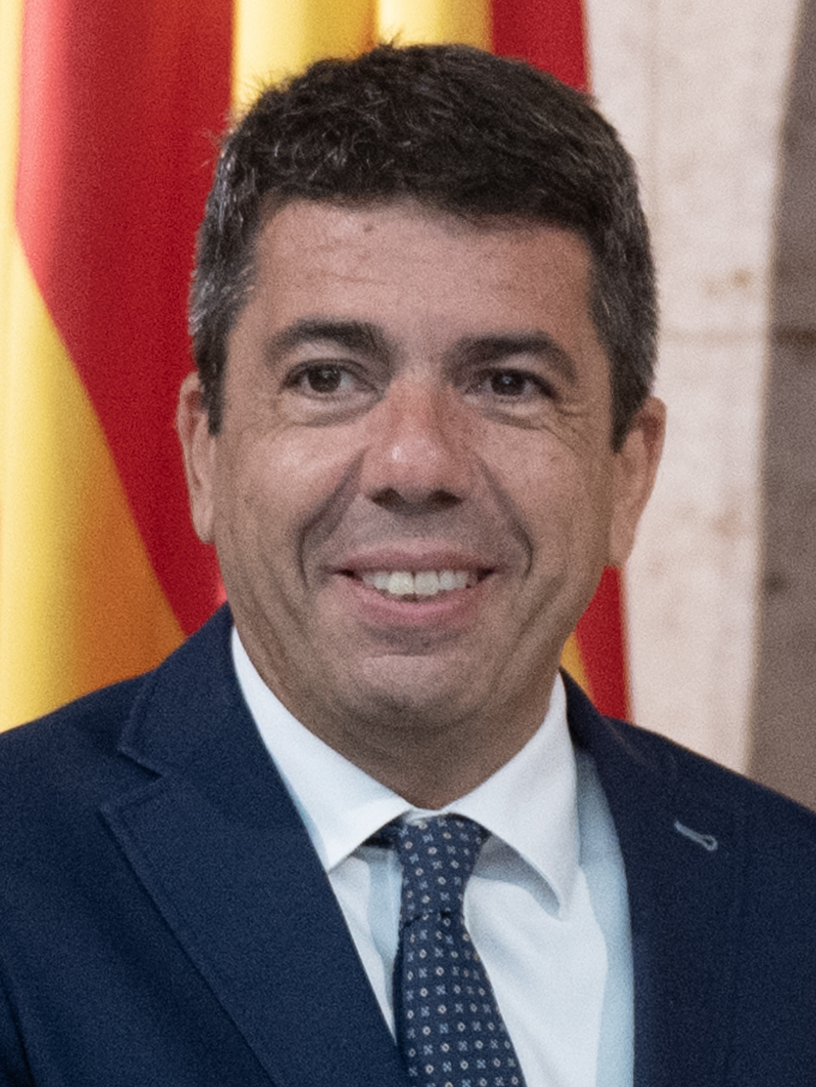
- Mazón in 2025

President of the Valencian Community
- In office 13 July 2023 – 29 November 2025
- Monarch: Felipe VI
- Preceded by: Ximo Puig
- Succeeded by: Juanfran Pérez Llorca

President of the People's Party of the Valencian Community
- Incumbent
- In office 3 July 2021 – 22 December 2025
- Preceded by: Isabel Bonig
- Succeeded by: Juanfran Pérez Llorca

Member of the Corts Valencianes
- Incumbent
- Assumed office 26 June 2023
- Constituency: Valencia

Personal details
- Born: Carlos Arturo Mazón Guixot; 8 April 1974 (age 52) Alicante, Spain
- Party: People's Party
- Spouse: María del Carmen Beviá

Carlos Arturo Mazón Guixot (born 8 April 1974) is a Spanish politician who served as president of the Valencian Government from 2023 to 2025.

He was elected president of the Provincial Deputation of the Province of Alicante in 2019 and led the People's Party of the Valencian Community (PPCV) from 2021 to 2025, leading them to victory in the 2023 Valencian regional election.

Mazón became president of the Valencian Government in July 2023 after forming a coalition with Vox. Twelve months later, he dismissed the Vox ministers in his government after a nationwide rupture between the parties, and continued in a minority government. He was president during the 2024 Spain floods, of which the worst damage was in the Valencian Community. Due to his alleged mismanagement of the crisis, along with unknown whereabouts during the first moments of it, he faced repeated calls for resignation. Following months of protests and after receiving insults from the families of the victims during the 2025 state remembrance service, on 3 November 2025 he announced his resignation as president of the Valencian Community.

== Early life ==
Born in Alicante, Mazón's father of the same name was a haemotologist, who had a street in the city named after him. His maternal grandfather, Alfonso Guixot Guixot, was a businessman involved in entertainment; he owned cinemas and a bullring, and was president of Hércules CF football club.

Mazón graduated in law from the University of Alicante, where he was a member of the student council as the leader of the union Programa 10. He was a member of the New Generations of the People's Party. When the PP entered government in the Valencian Community under Eduardo Zaplana after the 1999 elections, 25-year-old Mazón became director of the Valencian Youth Institute.

== Political career ==
=== Early political career ===
In 2003, under new Valencian president Francisco Camps, Mazón led the Department of Commerce and Consumption. Four years later, following a rift in the People's Party of the Valencian Community (PPCV) between followers of Zaplana and Camps, he was one of the members of the former, more liberal faction that left regional politics and moved into the politics of the Province of Alicante. He served as a councillor in the provincial capital and in the small town of Catral, as well as being director of the Chamber of Commerce and a member of the Provincial Deputation.

Mazón was elected President of the Provincial Deputation of Alicante in July 2019, receiving support from Citizens to be the fifth consecutive PP president since 1995. A year later, he received 98% of the votes to lead the PP branch in his province.

=== President of the Valencian Government ===
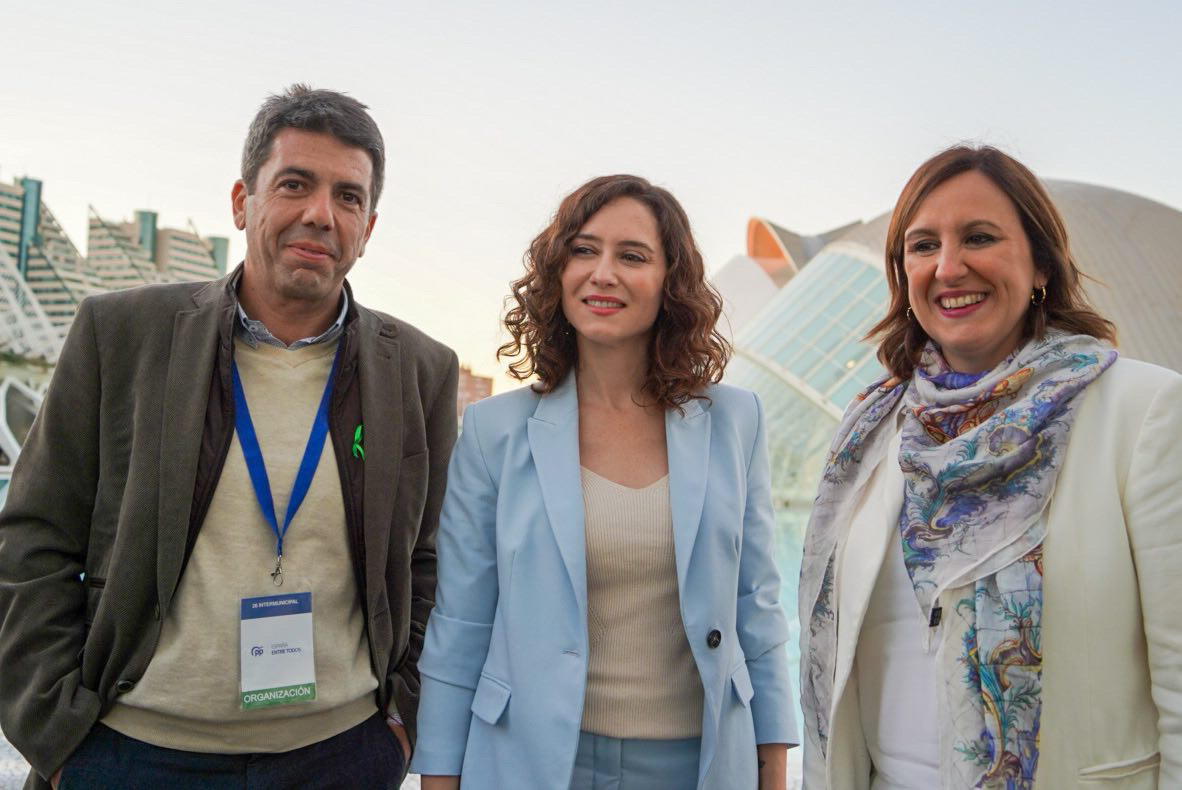
Mazón, Isabel Díaz Ayuso and María José Catalá in February 2023

In July 2021, Mazón succeeded Isabel Bonig as PP leader in the Valencian Community.

In the 2023 Valencian regional election, his party came first with 40 seats, up from 19. The PP formed a government with the 13 deputies from Vox, on the terms of the PP's national leadership that the government would exclude Vox leader Carlos Flores, who was convicted of harassing his ex-wife in 2002. The parties formed a government in July, with ten ministers – two fewer than the previous government. Seven were from the PP, and three from Vox, including vice president and Minister of Culture and Sport Vicente Barrera, a former bullfighter. The PP-Vox government led by Mazón gave subsidies to organisations such as Lo Rat Penat and the Royal Academy of Valencian Culture that propose that the Valencian language is separate to Catalan, while removing funds to organisations it accused of supporting Catalanism.

In July 2024, Mazón fired his ministers from Vox and continued to govern as a minority. This followed nationwide threats by the party's leader Santiago Abascal for Vox to resign from PP-led regional governments, as part of a dispute over migration. Mazón and Barrera spoke positively of each other after the rupture.

==== 2024 Spanish floods ====
Mazón was president during the October 2024 Spain floods. He received criticism for having eliminated his predecessor Ximo Puig's planned Valencian Emergencies Unit: a coordinating body for disaster response, conceived after similar floods in September 2019. The government spokesman stated it was abolished in order to reduce public expenditure and increase efficiency. Previously, the organisation had been criticised by the local firefighters' union as duplicating their work, before they agreed to it.

Mazón was also criticised for having a lunch lasting several hours with a journalist on the afternoon of the disaster. He left the lunch around 6pm and arrived at the emergency command centre about 7:30pm.

Mazón, prime minister Pedro Sánchez of the PSOE and King Felipe VI of Spain were all met with hostility by locals affected by the floods. According to the BBC, Mazón blamed the national government body CHJ for allegedly issuing and retracting a flood warning, which the CHJ denied. He was accused of not calling for sufficient help from the armed forces, for which he said that it was their decision to intervene. Mazón's point on the military was disputed by Javier Marcos, head of the Military Emergency Unit (UME), who said that regional governments had to ask for support.

On 9 November 2024, an estimated 130,000 people protested in Valencia, calling for Mazón to resign over the handling of the floods. A separate rally with 1,200 members, led by the Workers' Front, called for both Mazón and Sánchez to resign.

On the first anniversary of the floods, Mazón was insulted as a "murderer" "coward" and "son of a bitch" by members of the public. On 3 November 2025, he announced his resignation as regional president while keeping his seat as a deputy and therefore parliamentary immunity. Instead of calling snap elections, the members of the Corts would choose the next president. Mazón admitted to errors, including his schedule on the day of the disaster, but denied bad faith.

== Personal life ==
Mazón is married to María del Carmen "Mamen" Mira Beviá, with whom he has two children. A nurse in an Alicante hospital, she was rarely seen at public events with him. Her uncle was José Vicente Beviá Pastor, a PSOE politician who was in the Senate when the Constitution of Spain was approved in 1978.

Mazón is a member of the four-piece band Marengo, which auditioned to represent Spain in the Eurovision Song Contest 2011. In 2013, the band toured the Province of Alicante and the Region of Murcia.
