= People's Party of the Valencian Community =

People's Party of the Valencian Community Partido Popular de la Comunidad Valenciana
- President: Juanfran Pérez Llorca
- Secretary-General: Carlos Gil Santiago
- Spokesperson: Fernando Pastor Llorens
- Founded: 1989
- Headquarters: C/ Quart, 102; 46008 Valencia, Spain
- Ideology: Conservatism; Liberal conservatism Christian democracy Faction: Blaverism
- Political position: Centre-right to right-wing
- National affiliation: PP
- Colors: Sky blue
- Corts Valencianes: 40 / 99
- Congress of Deputies: 13 / 33
- Senate: 11 / 18
- Local Government (2015): 2,219 / 5,784

Website
- www.ppcv.com

The People's Party of the Valencian Community (Spanish: Partido Popular de la Comunidad Valenciana; Valencian: Partit Popular de la Comunitat Valenciana, PP or PPCV) is the Valencian branch of the People's Party, as well as one of the historically most powerful organizations within the PP.

Upon its foundation, the PPCV remained at opposition under the leadership of Pedro Agramunt. However, after Eduardo Zaplana was elected as new party leader in 1993, the party was able to win the 1995 election by a simple majority and form a coalition government with Valencian Union. In 1999 the party obtained the absolute majority in the Valencian Courts, which it held for the next 16 years.

The party, which turned into one of the most powerful organizations in the Valencian Community, was expelled from government in the 2015 election after a 20-year uninterrupted stay in power amid accusations of political corruption and illegal financing. Post-election agreements between Compromís, PSPV and Podemos, as well as other minor left-wing forces, deprived it from the government of most main cities in the Community, which it had been controlling for decades.

== History ==
=== Final term (2011–2015) ===
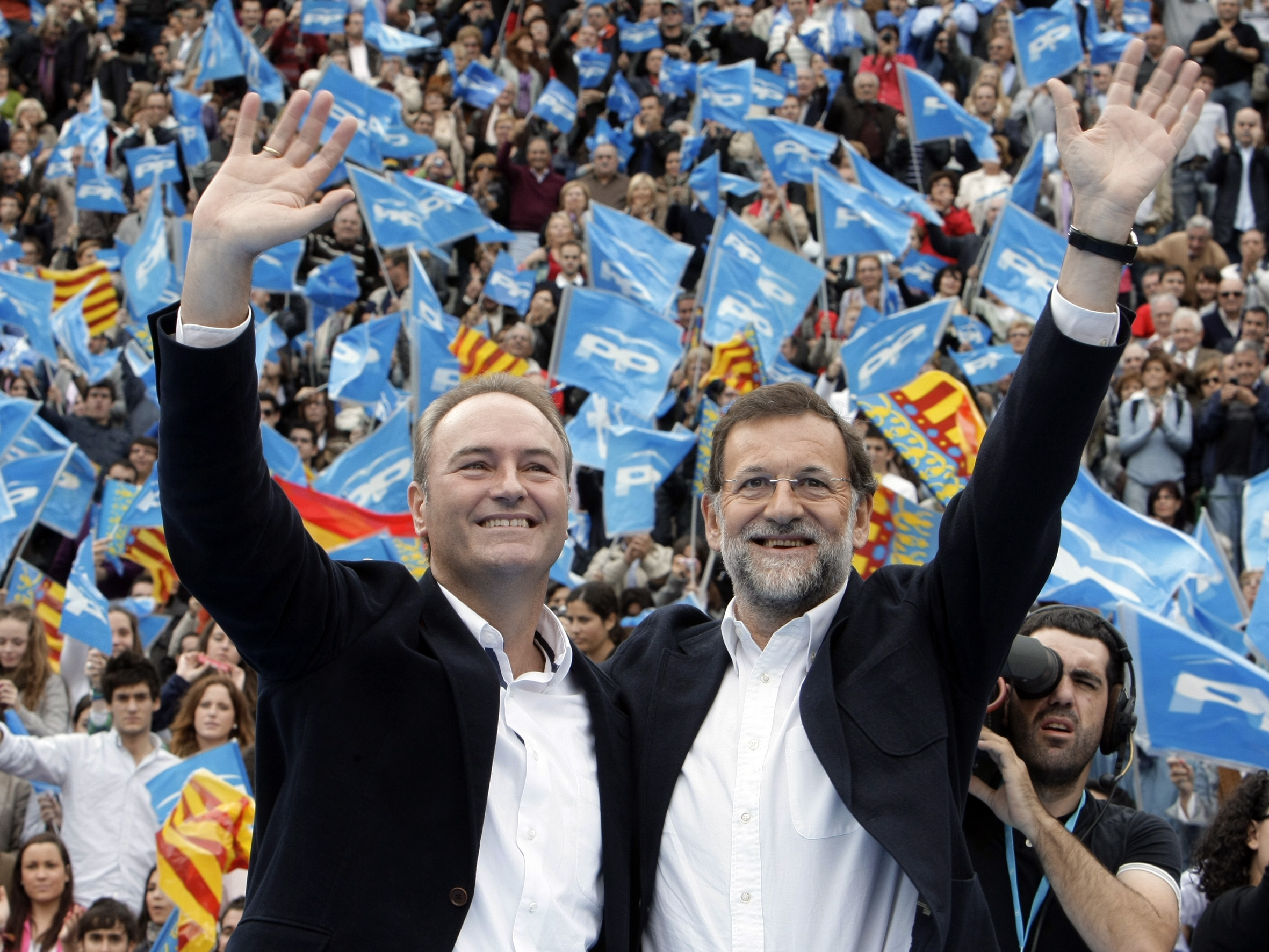
President of the Valencian Government Alberto Fabra and prime minister Mariano Rajoy at a PPCV event in the Plaza de Toros de Valencia in November 2011

Two months after the 2011 election, in which the PPCV enlarged its absolute majority, President Francisco Camps resigned because of his alleged implication in the Gürtel affair, a corruption scandal affecting senior regional party members unveiled in 2009 and that, since then, had begun eroding support for the party in the Community. Camps was replaced as President of the Valencian Government by Alberto Fabra. The following years saw the unveiling of a series of corruption scandals that rocked the PPCV, involving party MPs, mayors, local councillors, regional councillors, Courts' speakers and former regional president José Luis Olivas. At one point, up to 20% of the party MPs in the Valencian Courts (11 out of 55) were charged in different corruption cases; a joke popularized at the time said that they would become the third political force in the Valencian Courts, only behind PP and PSOE, if they were to form their own parliamentary group. The regional party leadership also had to cope with accusations of illegal financing as well as possible embezzlement in the additional costs incurred in the Formula 1 project and Pope Benedict XVI's 2006 visit to Valencia.

At the same time, the regional government had to deal with the effects of the ongoing financial crisis. Despite the community's decision to ask for a bailout from the central government headed by Mariano Rajoy in July 2012, its economic situation remained severe. Fabra's government had to close down RTVV, the regional public television broadcasting channel, because of financing issues; a decision which was met with widespread protest.

The 2014 European Parliament election resulted in enormous losses for the People's Party, which, in the largest Valencian cities, lost almost half of its votes in percentage terms compared to the previous elections. Both the economic crisis and corruption helped hasten the party's decline, which had already seen support drop in opinion polls since 2011. By 2015, corruption scandals had begun to reach party icons such as long-time Mayor of Valencia Rita Barberá, involved in an expenses scandal, embezzlement and a possible illegal party funding scheme at the regional level. The "Imelsa case", another related scandal, shook the PP 2015 electoral campaign as leaked recordings allegedly belonging to public entity Imelsa former director, Marcos Benavent, involved senior party officials, such as Xàtiva Mayor and President of the Valencia Deputation Alfonso Rus, in an alleged illegal financing network of the Valencian PP. The PP denounced Rus and expelled him from the party just 20 days ahead of the election, but he refused to withdraw as candidate and continued campaigning as an independent; the PP being unable to contest the local election in Xàtiva in a separate list.

As a result of these combined events, the party suffered a spectacular collapse in popular support in the 2015 regional election, where it lost 44% of its seats and 46% of its 2011 party vote. Thanks to an agreement between the PSPV, Compromís and Podemos in which Ximo Puig was appointed as new regional President with Mònica Oltra as his deputy, the PPCV was expelled from power after two decades in office.

=== Operation Taula ===
'Operation Taula', a major police operation in Valencia that took place on 26 January 2016, resulted in the arrest of several former and current high-ranking members from the regional PP branch, as a consequence of the ongoing investigation on the PP's corruption in the region during its time in government. Judicial investigation also pointed to former long-time Mayor of Valencia Rita Barberá as a participant in the scandal; her arrest or imputation only being prevented by the fact she had legal protection as an incumbent senator. A few days later, on 1 February, all PP city councillors in the city of Valencia were charged for a possible money laundering offense, including new local party leader Alfonso Novo, as well as most members of Barberá's late government.

Voices within the Valencian PP pointed to the party's refoundation in the region as a regionalist party, in order to try to distance itself as much as possible from the PPCV's past. Interim party leader Isabel Bonig claimed for an extraordinary party congress to be held to rethink the structure and future of the party in the Valencian Community, emphasizing its Valencian roots.

== Leaders ==
=== Party Presidents ===
- 1989–1990: Management Board (headed by Juan Antonio Montesinos)
- 1990–1993: Pedro Agramunt
- 1993–2002: Eduardo Zaplana
- 2002–2011: Francisco Camps
- 2011–2015: Alberto Fabra
- 2015–2021: Isabel Bonig
- 2021–present: Carlos Mazón

=== Presidents of the Valencian Government ===
- 1995–2002: Eduardo Zaplana
- 2002–2003: José Luis Olivas
- 2003–2011: Francisco Camps
- 2011–2015: Alberto Fabra
- 2023-: Carlos Mazón

== Election results ==
=== Corts Valencianes ===
Corts Valencianes
Election	Vote	%	Score	Seats	+/–	Leader	Status in legislature	
Election	Vote	%	Score	Seats	+/–	Leader	Status	Period
1991	558,617	27.82%	2nd	31 / 89	6 (Note: Compared to People's Alliance totals in the 1987 regional election.)	Pedro Agramunt	Opposition	1991–1995
1995	1,013,859	42.83%	1st	42 / 89	11	Eduardo Zaplana	Majority coalition (PP–UV)	1995–1999
1999	1,085,011	47.88%	1st	49 / 89	7	Eduardo Zaplana	Majority government	1999–2015
2003	1,146,780	47.17%	1st	48 / 89	1	Francisco Camps	Majority government	1999–2015
2007	1,277,458	52.52%	1st	54 / 99	6	Francisco Camps	Majority government	1999–2015
2011	1,211,112	49.42%	1st	55 / 99	1	Francisco Camps	Majority government	1999–2015
2015	658,612	26.61%	1st	31 / 99	24	Alberto Fabra	Opposition	2015–2023
2019	508,534	19.12%	2nd	19 / 99	12	Isabel Bonig	Opposition	2015–2023
2023	881,893	35.75%	1st	40 / 99	21	Carlos Mazón	Majority coalition (PP–Vox)	2023–2024
2023	881,893	35.75%	1st	40 / 99	21	Carlos Mazón	Minority government	2024–present

=== Cortes Generales ===
Cortes Generales
Election	Valencian Community						
Election	Congress					Senate	
Election	Vote	%	Score	Seats	+/–	Seats	+/–
1989	572,101	27.00%	2nd	9 / 31	1 (Note: Compared to People's Coalition totals in the 1986 general election.)	3 / 12	0
1993	987,317	40.48%	1st	15 / 31	6	8 / 12	5
1996	1,130,813	43.73%	1st	15 / 32	0	9 / 12	1
2000	1,267,062	52.11%	1st	19 / 32	4	9 / 12	0
2004	1,242,800	46.78%	1st	17 / 32	2	9 / 12	0
2008	1,415,793	51.59%	1st	19 / 33	2	9 / 12	0
2011	1,390,233	53.32%	1st	20 / 33	1	9 / 12	0
2015	838,135	31.26%	1st	11 / 32	9	9 / 12	0
2016	919,229	35.44%	1st	13 / 33	2	9 / 12	0
2019 (Apr)	498,680	18.56%	2nd	7 / 32	6	3 / 12	6
2019 (Nov)	584,415	23.04%	2nd	8 / 32	1	6 / 12	3
2023	922,064	34.87%	1st	13 / 33	5	8 / 12	2

=== European Parliament ===
European Parliament
Election	Valencian Community		
Election	Vote	%	Score
1989	390,500	22.75%	2nd
1994	882,448	44.19%	1st
1999	1,080,472	47.66%	1st
2004	868,948	49.72%	1st
2009	984,005	52.23%	1st
2014	510,586	29.01%	1st
2019	522,998	22.60%	2nd
2024	705,071	35.86%	1st
