= Valencian Corts =

Main legislative body of the Valencian Community, Spain

Coordinates: 39°28′40″N 0°22′28″W

Corts Valencianes

Type
- Type: Spanish regional legislature
- Houses: Unicameral

Leadership
- President: Llanos Massó, Vox since 26 July 2023
- First vice president: Alfredo Castelló, PP since 26 July 2023
- Second vice president: Gabriela Bravo, PSPV since 26 July 2023
- First secretary: Víctor Soler, PP since 26 July 2023
- Second secretary: María José Amigó, Compromís since 26 July 2023

Structure
- Seats: 99
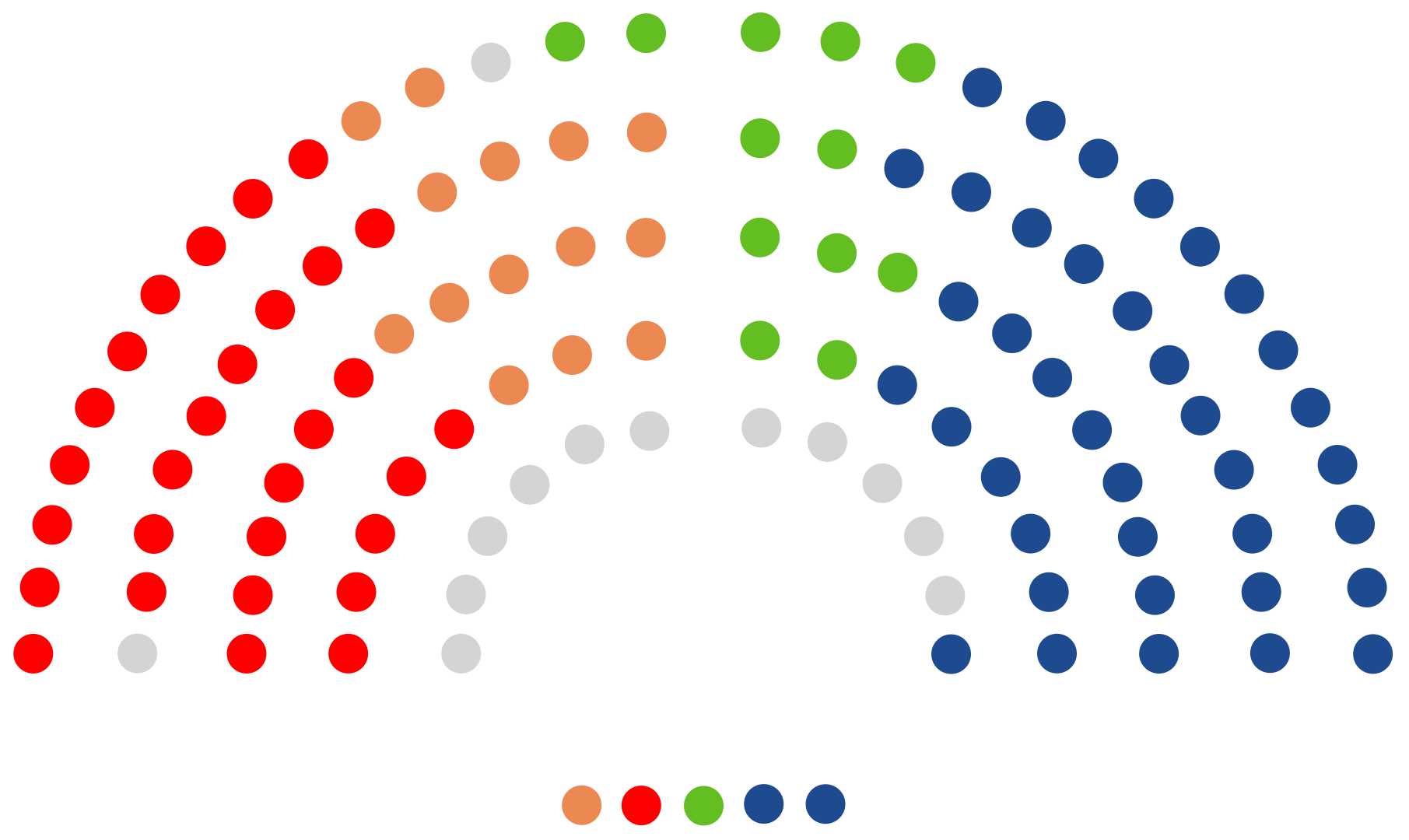
- Political groups: Government (40): PP (40); Opposition (59): PSPV-PSOE (31); Compromís (15) (Note: Més–Compromís (9); Valencian People's Initiative (4); Greens Equo (2)); Vox (13)

Elections
- Voting system: Party-list proportional representation D'Hondt method
- Last election: 28 May 2023

Meeting place
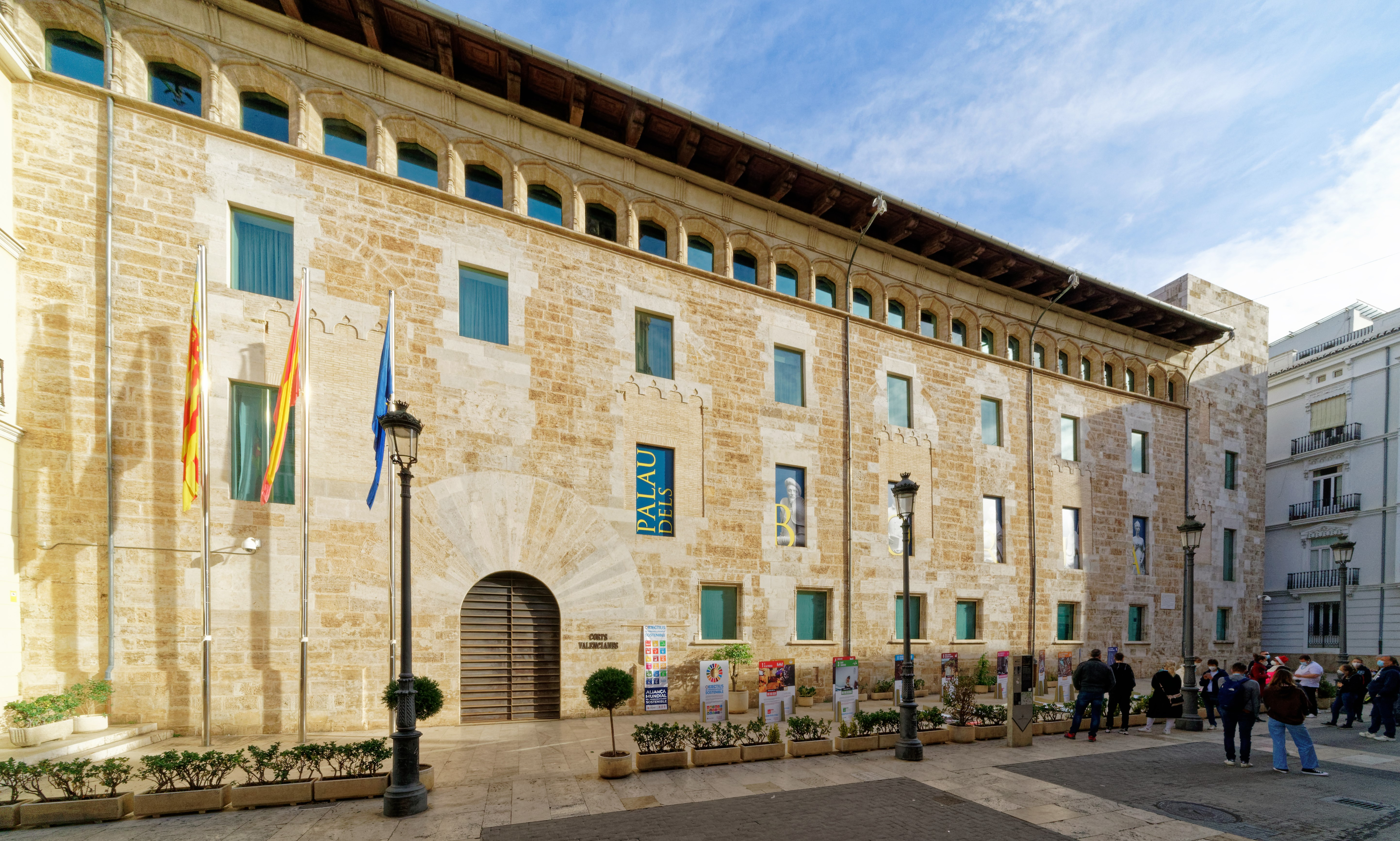
- Palace of the Borgias, Valencia

Website
- www.cortsvalencianes.es

The Valencian Corts (lit. 'Valencian Courts'), or Corts Valencianes, (Note: Pronunciation of "Corts Valencianes": [ˈkoɾ(d)z valensiˈanes]) commonly known as Les Corts, (Note: Pronunciation of "Les Corts" [les ˈkoɾ(t)s]) are the main legislative body of the Generalitat Valenciana and therefore of the Valencian Community. The main location of the Corts is in the Palace of the Borgias in Valencia. However it can meet at any location in the Valencian lands. The Corts has its origins in bodies established in the thirteenth century by King James I of Aragon. The modern institution was established in 1982 under the Valencian statute of autonomy of 1982. The current Corts were elected in 2023.

== History ==
Following the conquest and reign of James I of Aragon, the economic and military needs of the Crown of Aragon justified some meetings of the king with representatives of the three social classes (the nobility, who controlled the military forces, the church and the middle class), to obtain military or financial services. The economic needs justified those meetings, and at the beginning of the sixteenth century, a stable institution called the Corts Valencianes had already been established.

Among the meetings which were held during the reign of James I, the most important was that of 7 April 1261 in Valencia, during which the king promulgated the Furs of Valencia, a series of charters equivalent to a modern constitution. Proof of the economic importance of the corts for the crown is that the king promulgated the Furs in exchange for the sum of 48,000 crowns, which were paid to him by the cities of Valencia and Horta de València which belonged to the clergy and to the nobility, and by the towns of Castelló, Vilafamés, Onda, Llíria, Corbera, Cullera and Gandia.

At the time of those corts, King James established a rule for his successors obliging them to organise a general cort in Valencia at the beginning of each reign, in the first month after their entry into the city. This obligation was renewed during the corts of 1271, the corts were summoned by James I and later by his son Peter III of Aragon. Those Corts were the only obligatory meetings, but the king summoned the corts on other occasions when required.

In 1302, James II decided that it was necessary to summon the corts every three years. Later, during the corts of 1336, Peter IV confirmed this triennial meeting, by specifying that the corts were to meet every three years on All Saints' Day.

During the thirteenth century and at the beginning of the fourteenth, the representations of the other cities in the Kingdom of Valencia were gradually added, until the corts of 1239, during which the representations of various territories met, already constituting the corts of all the Kingdom.

From that moment, the most important cities always met, while others attended depending on the relevance to them of the subjects being discussed. However, the representation was generally important. For example, in the Corts of Valencia of 1510, the following towns were represented: Ademús, Alacant, Alcoi, Alpuente, Alzira, Biar, Bocairent, Borriana, Cabdet, Castelló, Castielfabib, Cullera, Llíria, Morella, Ontinyent, Orihuela, Penàguila, Peníscola, València, Vila Joiosa, Vila-real, Xàtiva, Xèrica and Xixona. Half of the assemblies took place in Valencia cathedral.

The Valencian Corts of 1418, fixed the duration of the corts at three years. In the middle of the fifteenth century, the Valencian institutions were definitively established.

With the unification of the crowns of Castile and Aragon, the Valencian corts declined in importance and were less frequently convened during the sixteenth century, a trend that continued in the seventeenth century. The last corts met in Valencia in 1645. Finally, after the War of the Spanish Succession and the new decree of 1707, the Kingdom of Valencia and its local rights were abolished.

The Corts Valencianes were not convened again until their reestablishment under the Statute of Autonomy of 1982. As of the coming into effect of the Statute of Autonomy, the Corts have operated like a modern representative legislature. Although usually meeting in the provincial capital of Valencia city, they have met in various towns around the Valencian community in recent years, an initiative which has been developed by the most recent legislatures.

== Modern legislatures ==
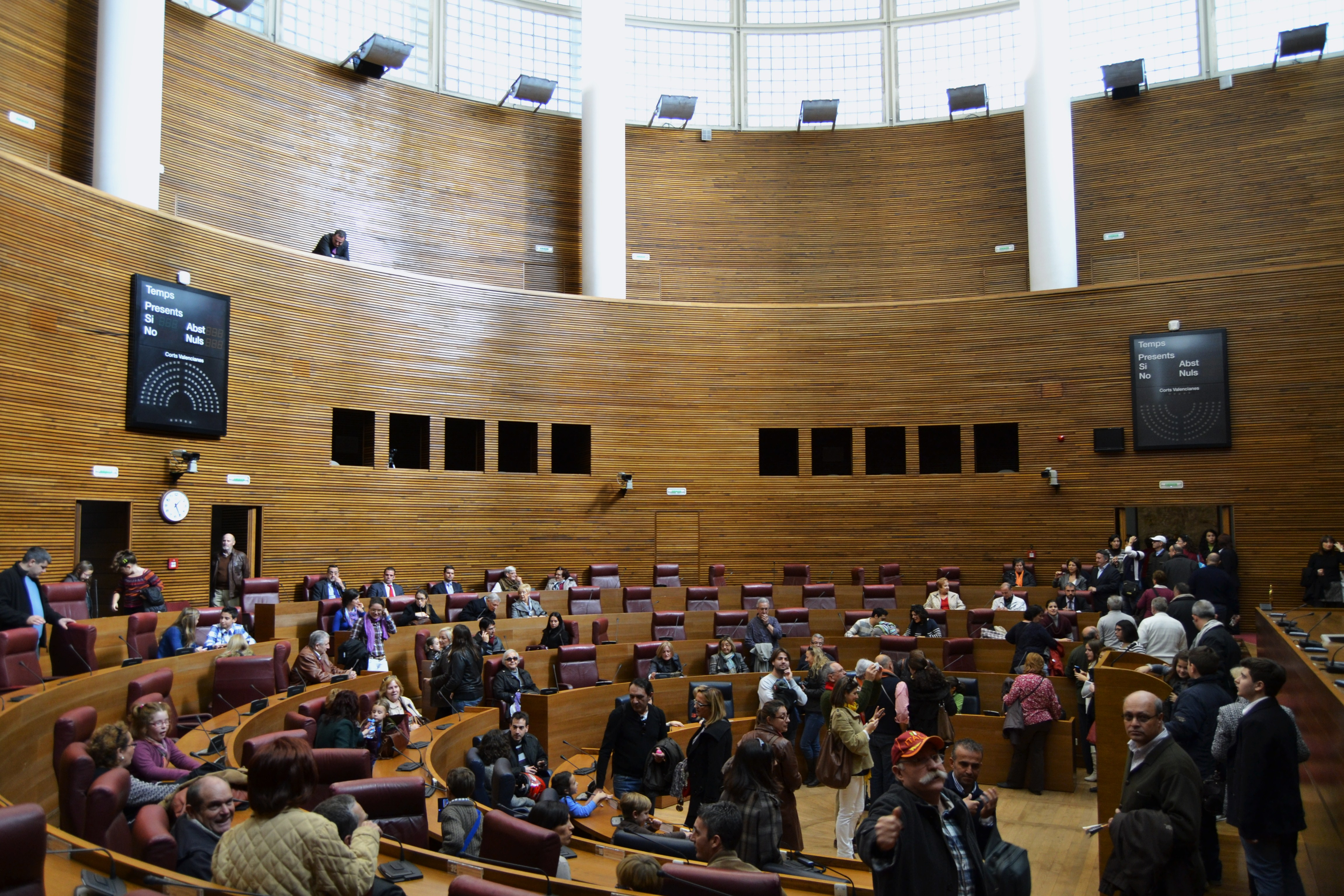
The Meeting chamber of the Cort Valencianes.

The first legislature in modern times was elected in May 1983. The Spanish Socialist Workers' Party (PSOE) won an absolute majority of votes and seats, with 51 of the 89 seats. However they lost their majority in 1987 and were forced to govern in coalition with the smaller United Left party. They won the 1991 elections with a majority of one seat, winning 45 seats in total. However, in the 1995 elections there was a swing to the right with the People's Party (PP) becoming the largest party with 42 seats and governing in coalition with the smaller Unió Valenciana (Valencian Union). This lasted until the elections of 1999 when the PP won an absolute majority with 49 seats. Although they lost a seat in 2003, they strengthened their position in the elections of 2007 and 2011, winning a record 55 seats. In the 2015 elections PP lost the majority, and a coalition of PSPV-PSOE and Compromís came to power. This situation remained the same in the 2019 elections. Then, in 2023, the PP won 40 seats and began governing in coalition with Vox.

=== Results of the elections to the Corts Valencianes ===
Deputies in the Corts Valencianes since 1983
Key to parties PCE–PCPV IU–UPV EUPV Compromís PV Commitment Coalition Podemos United We Can–United Left PSPV–PSOE CDS UV Cs PP CP AP Vox
Election	Distribution	President
1983	6 / 51 / 32	Joan Lerma (PSPV–PSOE)
1987	6 / 42 / 10 / 6 / 25	Joan Lerma (PSPV–PSOE)
1991	6 / 45 / 7 / 31	Joan Lerma (PSPV–PSOE)
1995	10 / 32 / 5 / 42	Eduardo Zaplana (PP)
1999	5 / 35 / 49	Eduardo Zaplana (PP)
2003	6 / 35 / 48	Francisco Camps (PP)
2007	7 / 38 / 54	Francisco Camps (PP)
2011	5 / 6 / 33 / 55	Alberto Fabra (PP)
2015	13 / 19 / 23 / 13 / 31	Ximo Puig (PSPV–PSOE)
2019	8 / 17 / 27 / 18 / 19 / 10	Ximo Puig (PSPV–PSOE)
2023	15 / 31 / 40 / 13	Carlos Mazón (PP)

== Organisation, rules and composition ==
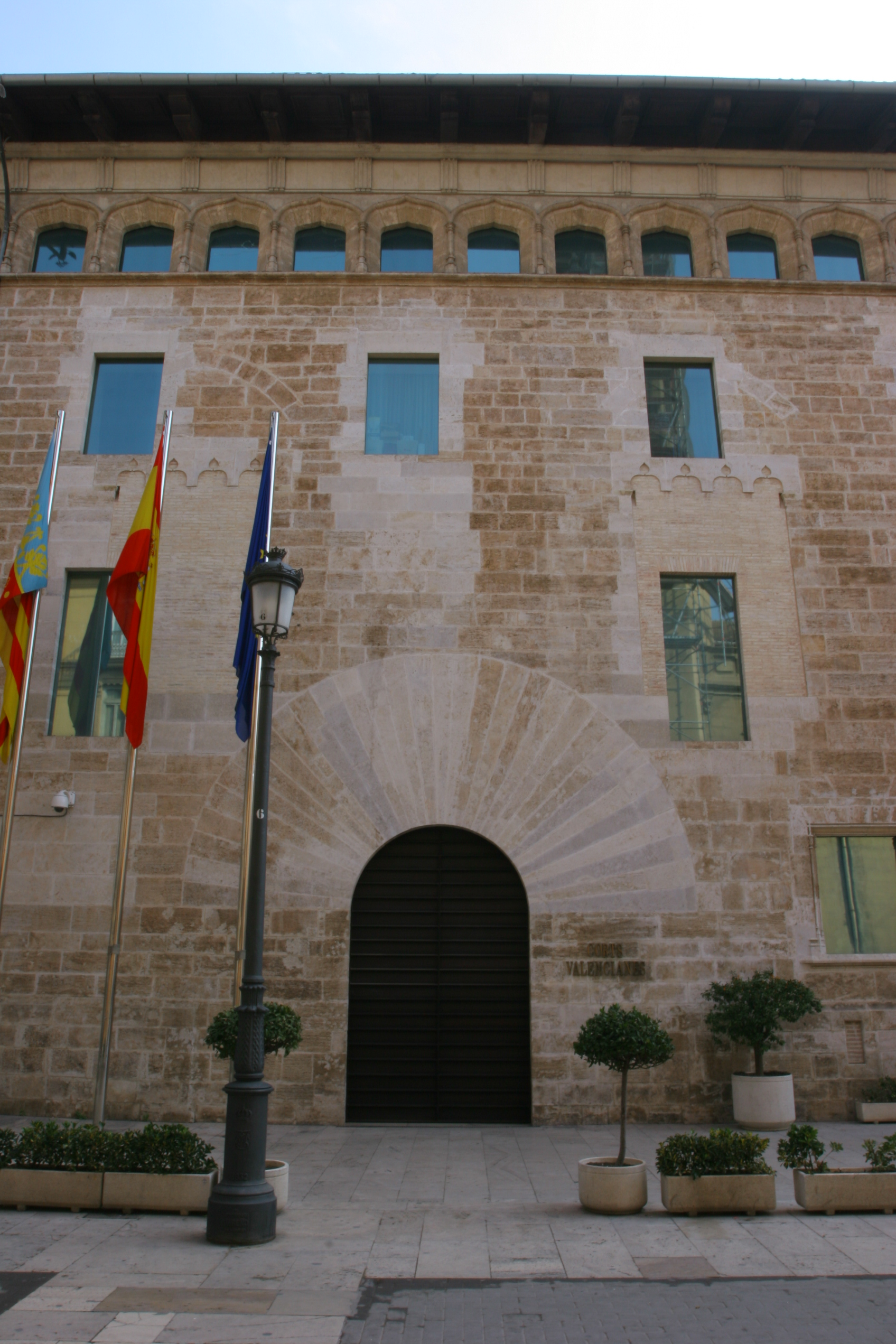
Main entrance to the Corts. (Palace of the Borgias)

Following the passing of the statute of autonomy of the Valencian Community, which established local government for the region, the Corts became the regional assembly, elected every four years by universal adult suffrage.

The name originated in the historic Valencian Corts, however previous bodies of that name had different functions representing three institutions: the clergy, the military/nobility and the royal family.

The Statute of Autonomy primarily defines the Corts Valencianes in chapter II, title II, although there are also references in other articles. The Statute simply indicates the composition of Corts, its functions, the basic principles of the electoral system, and traces the general framework of the Statute of the Deputies. Laws which develop the Statute, the rules of the Corts Valencianes regulate the organization and the operation of the Corts. The first rules were adopted during the transition stage. Since that moment, the rules have been modified on various occasions; the current drafting was ratified on 30 June 1994.

The 1982 Statute of Autonomy states that the Corts will have a number of deputies ranging from 75 to 100. The current electoral law fixes the number at 99 deputies, divided according to the provinces and the electoral constituencies. Currently in the legislature 35 deputies are elected for the Province of Alicante, 24 deputies for the Province of Castellón and 40 deputies for the Province of Valencia. The Statute of Autonomy also states that to be elected, candidates must belong to a list which obtains at least 5% of the total number of votes. Certain political parties and alliances who fail to achieve that threshold, cannot enter the Parliament. For lists which cross the 5% barrier, the distribution of seats is done according to the D'Hondt method.

== See also ==
- List of presidents of the Corts Valencianes
- Palace of the Borgias
- Generalitat Valenciana
- Kingdom of Valencia
- Furs of Valencia
