= Second government of Ximo Puig =

Government of the Valencian Community between 2019 and 2023

2nd government of Ximo Puig
- Government of the Valencian Community
- 2019–2023
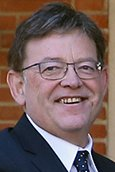
- Ximo Puig in October 2018
- Date formed: 17 June 2019
- Date dissolved: 19 July 2023

People and organisations
- Monarch: Felipe VI
- President: Ximo Puig
- Vice Presidents: Aitana Mas ^{(1st)} (2022–2023); Héctor Illueca ^{(2nd)} (2021–2023); Mónica Oltra ^{(1st)} (2019–2022); Rubén Martínez Dalmau ^{(2nd)} (2019–2021)
- No. of ministers: 11 (Note: Does not include the President.)
- Total no. of members: 16
- Member party: PSPV–PSOE; Compromís; Unides Podem
- Status in legislature: Majority coalition government
- Opposition party: PP
- Opposition leader: Isabel Bonig (2019–2021); Carlos Mazón (2021–2023)

History
- Election: 2019 regional election
- Outgoing election: 2023 regional election
- Legislature term: 10th Corts
- Budget: 2020, 2021, 2022
- Predecessor: Puig I
- Successor: Mazón

The second government of Ximo Puig was formed on 17 June 2019, following the latter's election as President of the Valencian Government by the Corts Valencianes on 13 June and his swearing-in on 15 June, as a result of the Socialist Party of the Valencian Country (PSPV–PSOE) emerging as the largest parliamentary force at the 2019 regional election. It succeeded the first Puig government and was the Valencian Government from 17 June 2019 to 19 July 2023, a total of 1,493 days, or 4 years, 1 month and 2 days.

The cabinet comprised members of the PSPV–PSOE, the Commitment Coalition (Compromís)—with the involvement of Valencian People's Initiative (IdPV) and Valencian Nationalist Bloc (Bloc, later transformed into More–Commitment)—and United We Can (Unides Podem)—comprising We Can (Podem) and United Left of the Valencian Country (EUPV)—, as well as a number of independents proposed by the first party. It was automatically dismissed on 29 May 2023 as a consequence of the 2023 regional election, but remained in acting capacity until the next government was sworn in.

== Investiture ==
Investiture; Ximo Puig (PSPV)
Ballot →	13 June 2019
Required majority →	50 out of 99
Yes: • PSPV (27); • Compromís (17); • Unides Podem–EUPV (8)	52 / 99
No: • PP (19); • Cs (17); • Vox (10)	46 / 99
Abstentions	0 / 99
Absentees: • Cs (1)	1 / 99

== Cabinet changes ==
Puig's second government saw a number of cabinet changes during its tenure:

- On 27 August 2021, second vice president and minister of Housing and Bioclimatic Architecture, Rubén Martínez Dalmau, announced his incoming resignation and farewell from politics following a number of disagreements with his party, Podem. The resignation was effective from 10 September, when Dalmau was replaced in both his posts by Héctor Illueca.
- On 14 May 2022, the cabinet saw an extensive reshuffle. Arcadi España replaced Vicent Soler at the helm of the Finance and Economic Model department, in turn being replaced as Territorial Policy, Public Works and Mobility minister by Rebeca Torró. Vicent Marzà vacated the Education, Culture and Sports ministry, who was assumed by Raquel Tamarit, whereas the Universal Healthcare and Public Health post saw Ana Barceló being replaced by Miguel Mínguez. Carolina Pascual was replaced as Minister of Innovation, Universities, Science and Digital Society by Josefina Bueno.
- On 21 June 2022, vice president Mónica Oltra resigned from all her government positions after the High Court of Justice of Valencia accused her and her ministry of negligence in the protection of a minor who was allegedly abused by her ex-husband, as well as an alleged concealment of the crimes. She was replaced in her government posts by Aitana Mas on 29 June.
- On 25 October 2022, Mireia Mollà was removed as Minister of Agriculture, Rural Development, Climate Emergency and Ecological Transition by request of Aitana Mas, unveiling an internal crisis within their party, Valencian People's Initiative (IdPV). She was replaced in her post by Isaura Navarro the next day.

== Council of Government ==
The Council of Government was structured into the offices for the president, the two vice presidents, 11 ministries and the posts of secretary and spokesperson of the Council.

← Puig II Government → (17 June 2019 – 19 July 2023)
Portfolio	Name	Party	Took office	Left office	Ref.
President	Ximo Puig	PSPV–PSOE	15 June 2019	15 July 2023	
Vice President; Minister of Equality and Inclusive Policies; Secretary and Spokesperson of the Council	Mónica Oltra	Compromís (IdPV)	17 June 2019	21 June 2022	
Second Vice President; Minister of Housing and Bioclimatic Architecture	Rubén Martínez Dalmau	UP (Podem)	17 June 2019	10 September 2021	
Minister of Finance and Economic Model	Vicent Soler	PSPV–PSOE	17 June 2019	14 May 2022	
Minister of Justice, Interior and Public Administration	Gabriela Bravo	Independent	17 June 2019	19 July 2023	
Minister of Education, Culture and Sports	Vicent Marzà	Compr. (Bloc / Més) (Note: The Bloc was refounded as Més–Compromís in June 2021.)	17 June 2019	14 May 2022	
Minister of Universal Healthcare and Public Health	Ana Barceló	PSPV–PSOE	17 June 2019	14 May 2022	
Minister of Sustainable Economy, Productive Sectors, Trade and Labour	Rafael Climent	Compr. (Bloc / Més)	17 June 2019	19 July 2023	
Minister of Agriculture, Rural Development, Climate Emergency and Ecological Transition	Mireia Mollà	Compromís (IdPV)	17 June 2019	25 October 2022	
Minister of Territorial Policy, Public Works and Mobility	Arcadi España	PSPV–PSOE	17 June 2019	14 May 2022	
Minister of Innovation, Universities, Science and Digital Society	Carolina Pascual	Independent	17 June 2019	14 May 2022	
Minister of Participation, Transparency, Cooperation and Democratic Quality	Rosa Pérez Garijo	UP (EUPV)	17 June 2019	19 July 2023	
=== Changes September 2021 ===
Portfolio	Name	Party	Took office	Left office	Ref.
Second Vice President; Minister of Housing and Bioclimatic Architecture	Héctor Illueca	Podem	10 September 2021	19 July 2023	
=== Changes May 2022 ===
Portfolio	Name	Party	Took office	Left office	Ref.
Minister of Finance and Economic Model	Arcadi España	PSPV–PSOE	14 May 2022	19 July 2023	
Minister of Education, Culture and Sports	Raquel Tamarit	Compromís (Més)	14 May 2022	19 July 2023	
Minister of Universal Healthcare and Public Health	Miguel Mínguez	Independent	14 May 2022	19 July 2023	
Minister of Territorial Policy, Public Works and Mobility	Rebeca Torró	PSPV–PSOE	14 May 2022	19 July 2023	
Minister of Innovation, Universities, Science and Digital Society	Josefina Bueno	PSPV–PSOE	14 May 2022	19 July 2023	
=== Changes June 2022 ===
Portfolio	Name	Party	Took office	Left office	Ref.
Vice President; Minister of Equality and Inclusive Policies; Secretary and Spokesperson of the Council	Aitana Mas	Compromís (IdPV)	29 June 2022	19 July 2023	
=== Changes October 2022 ===
Portfolio	Name	Party	Took office	Left office	Ref.
Minister of Agriculture, Rural Development, Climate Emergency and Ecological Transition	Isaura Navarro	Compromís (IdPV)	26 October 2022	19 July 2023	

== Departmental structure ==
Ximo Puig's second government was organised into several superior and governing units, whose number, powers and hierarchical structure varied depending on the ministerial department.

Office (Original name)	Portrait	Name	Took office	Left office	Alliance/party	Ref.
=== Presidency ===
Presidency (Presidencia de la Generalitat)		Ximo Puig	15 June 2019	15 July 2023	PSPV–PSOE	
=== Vice Presidency ===
Vice Presidency (Vicepresidencia)		Mónica Oltra	17 June 2019	21 June 2022 (resigned)	Compromís (IdPV)	
Vice Presidency (Vicepresidencia)		Aitana Mas	29 June 2022	19 July 2023	Compromís (IdPV)	
Vice Presidency (Vicepresidencia)	See Ministry of Equality and Inclusive Policies; See Ministry of Equality and Inclusive Policies					
=== Second Vice Presidency ===
Second Vice Presidency (Vicepresidencia Segunda)		Rubén Martínez Dalmau	17 June 2019	10 September 2021	Unides Podem (Podem)	
Second Vice Presidency (Vicepresidencia Segunda)		Héctor Illueca	10 September 2021	19 July 2023	Unides Podem (Podem)	
Second Vice Presidency (Vicepresidencia Segunda)	See Ministry of Housing and Bioclimatic Architecture					
=== Ministry of Equality and Inclusive Policies ===
Ministry of Equality and Inclusive Policies (Conselleria de Igualdad y Políticas Inclusivas)		Mónica Oltra	17 June 2019	21 June 2022 (resigned)	Compromís (IdPV)	
Ministry of Equality and Inclusive Policies (Conselleria de Igualdad y Políticas Inclusivas)		Aitana Mas	29 June 2022	19 July 2023	Compromís (IdPV)	
=== Ministry of Housing and Bioclimatic Architecture ===
Ministry of Housing and Bioclimatic; Architecture (Conselleria de Vivienda y Arquitectura; Bioclimática)		Rubén Martínez Dalmau	17 June 2019	10 September 2021	Unides Podem (Podem)	
Ministry of Housing and Bioclimatic; Architecture (Conselleria de Vivienda y Arquitectura; Bioclimática)		Héctor Illueca	10 September 2021	19 July 2023	Unides Podem (Podem)	
=== Ministry of Finance and Economic Model ===
Ministry of Finance and Economic Model (Conselleria de Hacienda y Modelo Económico)		Vicent Soler	17 June 2019	14 May 2022	PSPV–PSOE	
Ministry of Finance and Economic Model (Conselleria de Hacienda y Modelo Económico)		Arcadi España	14 May 2022	19 July 2023	PSPV–PSOE	
=== Ministry of Justice, Interior and Public Administration ===
Ministry of Justice, Interior and Public Administration (Conselleria de Justicia, Interior y Administración Pública)		Gabriela Bravo	17 June 2019	19 July 2023	PSPV–PSOE (Independent)	
=== Ministry of Education, Culture and Sports ===
Ministry of Education, Culture and Sports (Conselleria de Educación, Cultura y Deporte)		Vicent Marzà	17 June 2019	14 May 2022	Compromís (Més from Jun 2021; Bloc until Jun 2021)	
Ministry of Education, Culture and Sports (Conselleria de Educación, Cultura y Deporte)		Raquel Tamarit	14 May 2022	19 July 2023	Compromís (Més)	
=== Ministry of Universal Healthcare and Public Health ===
Ministry of Universal; Healthcare and Public Health (Conselleria de Sanidad; Universal y Salud Pública)		Ana Barceló	17 June 2019	14 May 2022	PSPV–PSOE	
Ministry of Universal; Healthcare and Public Health (Conselleria de Sanidad; Universal y Salud Pública)		Miguel Mínguez	17 June 2019	14 May 2022	PSPV–PSOE (Independent)	
=== Ministry of Sustainable Economy, Productive Sectors, Trade and Labour ===
Ministry of Sustainable Economy, Productive Sectors, Trade and Labour (Conselleria de Economía Sostenible, Sectores Productivos, Comercio y Trabajo)		Rafael Climent	17 June 2019	19 July 2023	Compromís (Més from Jun 2021; Bloc until Jun 2021)	
=== Ministry of Agriculture, Rural Development, Climate Emergency and Ecological Transition ===
Ministry of Agriculture, Rural; Development, Climate Emergency and Ecological Transition (Conselleria de Agricultura, Desarrollo Rural, Emergencia Climática y Transición Ecológica)		Mireia Mollà	17 June 2019	25 October 2022	Compromís (IdPV)	
Ministry of Agriculture, Rural; Development, Climate Emergency and Ecological Transition (Conselleria de Agricultura, Desarrollo Rural, Emergencia Climática y Transición Ecológica)		Isaura Navarro	26 October 2022	19 July 2023	Compromís (IdPV)	
=== Ministry of Territorial Policy, Public Works and Mobility ===
Ministry of Territorial Policy, Public Works and Mobility (Conselleria de Política Territorial, Obras Públicas y Movilidad)		Arcadi España	17 June 2019	14 May 2022	PSPV–PSOE	
Ministry of Territorial Policy, Public Works and Mobility (Conselleria de Política Territorial, Obras Públicas y Movilidad)		Rebeca Torró	14 May 2022	19 July 2023	PSPV–PSOE	
=== Ministry of Innovation, Universities, Science and Digital Society ===
Ministry of Innovation, Universities, Science and Digital Society (Conselleria de Innovación, Universidades, Ciencia y Sociedad Digital)		Carolina Pascual	17 June 2019	14 May 2022	PSPV–PSOE (Independent)	
Ministry of Innovation, Universities, Science and Digital Society (Conselleria de Innovación, Universidades, Ciencia y Sociedad Digital)		Josefina Bueno	14 May 2022	19 July 2023	PSPV–PSOE	
=== Ministry of Participation, Transparency, Cooperation and Democratic Quality ===
Ministry of Participation, Transparency, Cooperation and Democratic Quality (Conselleria de Participación, Transparencia, Cooperación y Calidad Democrática)		Rosa Pérez Garijo	17 June 2019	19 July 2023	Unides Podem (EUPV)	
=== Secretariat of the Council ===
Secretariat of the Council (Secretaría del Consell)		Mónica Oltra	17 June 2019	21 June 2022 (resigned)	Compromís (IdPV)	
Secretariat of the Council (Secretaría del Consell)		Aitana Mas	29 June 2022	19 July 2023	Compromís (IdPV)	
=== Spokesperson of the Council ===
Spokesperson of the Council (Portavoz del Consell)		Mónica Oltra	17 June 2019	21 June 2022 (resigned)	Compromís (IdPV)	
Spokesperson of the Council (Portavoz del Consell)		Aitana Mas	29 June 2022	19 July 2023	Compromís (IdPV)	

== Notes ==
Preceded by Puig I	Valencian Government; 2019–2023	Succeeded by Mazón
