= First government of Ximo Puig =

1st government of Ximo Puig
- Government of the Valencian Community
- 2015–2019
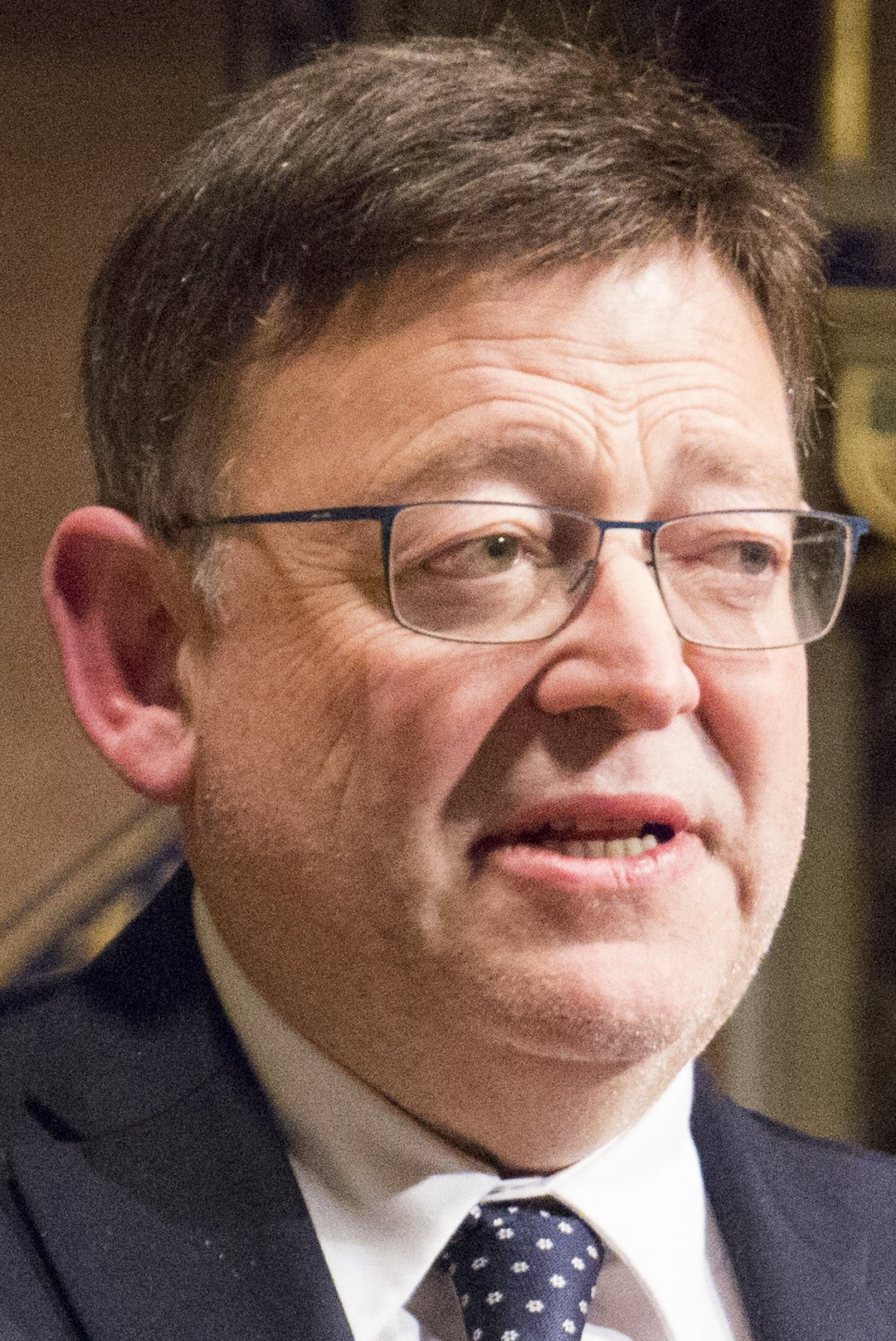
- Ximo Puig in February 2016.
- Date formed: 30 June 2015
- Date dissolved: 17 June 2019

People and organisations
- Monarch: Felipe VI
- President: Ximo Puig
- Vice President: Mónica Oltra
- No. of ministers: 9 (Note: Does not include the President.)
- Total no. of members: 10
- Member party: PSPV–PSOE; Compromís
- Status in legislature: Minority coalition government
- Opposition party: PP
- Opposition leader: Alberto Fabra (2015); Isabel Bonig (2015–2019)

History
- Election: 2015 regional election
- Outgoing election: 2019 regional election
- Legislature term: 9th Corts
- Budget: 2016, 2017, 2018, 2019
- Predecessor: Fabra
- Successor: Puig II

The first government of Ximo Puig was formed on 30 June 2015, following the latter's election as President of the Valencian Government by the Corts Valencianes on 25 June and his swearing-in on 28 June, as a result of the Socialist Party of the Valencian Country (PSPV–PSOE) and Commitment Coalition (Compromís) being able to muster a majority of seats in the Parliament with external support from We Can (Podemos) following the 2015 Valencian regional election. It succeeded the Fabra government and was the Valencian Government from 30 June 2015 to 17 June 2019, a total of 1,448 days, or 3 years, 11 months and 18 days.

The cabinet comprised members of the PSPV–PSOE and Compromís, as well as a number of independents proposed by both parties. It was automatically dismissed on 29 April 2019 as a consequence of the 2019 regional election, but remained in acting capacity until the next government was sworn in.

== Investiture ==
Investiture; Ximo Puig (PSPV)
Ballot →	25 June 2015
Required majority →	50 out of 99
Yes: • PSPV (23); • Compromís (19); • Podemos (8)	50 / 99
No: • PP (31); • C's (13)	44 / 99
Abstentions: • Podemos (5)	5 / 99
Absentees	0 / 99

== Cabinet changes ==
Puig's first government saw a number of cabinet changes during its tenure:

- On 7 June 2018, Universal Healthcare and Public Health minister Carmen Montón vacated her post in the cabinet in order to become Health minister in the new government of Prime Minister Pedro Sánchez following the 2018 vote of no confidence in the government of Mariano Rajoy. She was replaced in her post by Ana Barceló.

== Council of Government ==
The Council of Government was structured into the offices for the president, the vice president, nine ministries and the posts of secretary and spokesperson of the Council.

← Puig I Government → (30 June 2015 – 17 June 2019)
Portfolio	Name	Party	Took office	Left office	Ref.
President	Ximo Puig	PSPV–PSOE	27 June 2015	15 June 2019	
Vice President; Minister of Equality and Inclusive Policies; Secretary and Spokesperson of the Council	Mónica Oltra	Compromís (IdPV)	30 June 2015	17 June 2019	
Minister of Finance and Economic Model	Vicent Soler	PSPV–PSOE	30 June 2015	17 June 2019	
Minister of Justice, Public Administration, Democratic Reforms and Public Freedoms	Gabriela Bravo	Independent	30 June 2015	17 June 2019	
Minister of Education, Research, Culture and Sports	Vicent Marzà	Compromís (Bloc)	30 June 2015	17 June 2019	
Minister of Universal Healthcare and Public Health	Carmen Montón	PSPV–PSOE	30 June 2015	7 June 2018	
Minister of Sustainable Economy, Productive Sectors, Trade and Labour	Rafael Climent	Compromís (Bloc)	30 June 2015	17 June 2019	
Minister of Agriculture, Environment, Climatic Change and Rural Development	Elena Cebrián	Independent	30 June 2015	17 June 2019	
Minister of Housing, Public Works and Territory Structuring	María José Salvador	PSPV–PSOE	30 June 2015	17 June 2019	
Minister of Transparency, Social Responsibility, Participation and Cooperation	Manuel Alcaraz	Compromís (IdPV)	30 June 2015	17 June 2019	
=== Changes June 2018 ===
Portfolio	Name	Party	Took office	Left office	Ref.
Minister of Universal Healthcare and Public Health	Ana Barceló	PSPV–PSOE	7 June 2018	17 June 2019	

== Departmental structure ==
Ximo Puig's second government was organised into several superior and governing units, whose number, powers and hierarchical structure varied depending on the ministerial department.

Office (Original name)	Portrait	Name	Took office	Left office	Alliance/party	Ref.
=== Presidency ===
Presidency (Presidencia de la Generalitat)		Ximo Puig	27 June 2015	15 June 2019	PSPV–PSOE	
=== Vice Presidency ===
Vice Presidency (Vicepresidencia)		Mónica Oltra	30 June 2015	17 June 2019	Compromís (IdPV)	
Vice Presidency (Vicepresidencia)	See Ministry of Equality and Inclusive Policies					
=== Ministry of Equality and Inclusive Policies ===
Ministry of Equality and Inclusive Policies (Conselleria de Igualdad y Políticas Inclusivas)		Mónica Oltra	30 June 2015	17 June 2019	Compromís (IdPV)	
=== Ministry of Finance and Economic Model ===
Ministry of Finance and Economic Model (Conselleria de Hacienda y Modelo Económico)		Vicent Soler	30 June 2015	17 June 2019	PSPV–PSOE	
=== Ministry of Justice, Public Administration, Democratic Reforms and Public Freedoms ===
Ministry of Justice, Public; Administration, Democratic Reforms and Public Freedoms (Conselleria de Justicia, Administración; Pública, Reformas Democráticas y Libertades Públicas)		Gabriela Bravo	30 June 2015	17 June 2019	PSPV–PSOE (Independent)	
=== Ministry of Education, Research, Culture and Sports ===
Ministry of Education, Research, Culture and Sports (Conselleria de Educación, Investigación, Cultura y Deporte)		Vicent Marzà	30 June 2015	17 June 2019	Compromís (Bloc)	
=== Ministry of Universal Healthcare and Public Health ===
Ministry of Universal; Healthcare and Public Health (Conselleria de Sanidad; Universal y Salud Pública)		Carmen Montón	30 June 2015	7 June 2018	PSPV–PSOE	
Ministry of Universal; Healthcare and Public Health (Conselleria de Sanidad; Universal y Salud Pública)		Ana Barceló	7 June 2018	17 June 2019	PSPV–PSOE (Independent)	
=== Ministry of Sustainable Economy, Productive Sectors, Trade and Labour ===
Ministry of Sustainable Economy, Productive Sectors, Trade and Labour (Conselleria de Economía Sostenible, Sectores Productivos, Comercio y Trabajo)		Rafael Climent	30 June 2015	17 June 2019	Compromís (Bloc)	
=== Ministry of Agriculture, Environment, Climatic Change and Rural Development ===
Ministry of Agriculture, Environment, Climatic Change and Rural Development (Conselleria de Agricultura, Medio Ambiente, Cambio Climático y Desarrollo Rural)		Elena Cebrián	30 June 2015	17 June 2019	PSPV–PSOE (Independent)	
=== Ministry of Housing, Public Works and Territory Structuring ===
Ministry of Housing, Public Works and Territory Structuring (Conselleria de Vivienda, Obras Públicas y Vertebración del Territorio)		María José Salvador	30 June 2015	17 June 2019	PSPV–PSOE	
=== Ministry of Equality and Inclusive Policies ===
Ministry of Transparency, Social; Responsibility, Participation and Cooperation (Conselleria de Transparencia, Responsabilidad Social, Participación y Cooperación)		Manuel Alcaraz	30 June 2015	17 June 2019	Compromís (IdPV)	
=== Secretariat of the Council ===
Secretariat of the Council (Secretaría del Consell)		Mónica Oltra	30 June 2015	17 June 2019	Compromís (IdPV)	
=== Spokesperson of the Council ===
Spokesperson of the Council (Portavoz del Consell)		Mónica Oltra	30 June 2015	17 June 2019	Compromís (IdPV)	

== Notes ==
Preceded by Fabra	Valencian Government; 2015–2019	Succeeded by Puig II
