= List of Valencian political parties =

The list of Valencian political parties presents the political parties from the Valencian Community of modern Spain:

Political Party in valencian	Translation to English	Ideology	European affiliation	Positioning with respect to Europe	Leader of the party	Deputies in the Spanish Congress of deputies	Deputies in the Cortes Valencianas	Councillors
Partit Popular de la Comunitat Valenciana	People's Party of the Valencian Community	Conservatism, liberalism, spanish nationalism, Centre-right, Christian Democracy	European People's Party (as part of PP)	Europeanism	Alberto Fabra	20	55	2958
Partit Socialista del País Valencià-PSOE	Socialist Party of the Valencian Country-PSOE	Social democracy, Centre-left	European Socialist Party (as part of PSOE)	Europeanism	Ximo Puig	10	33	1887
Bloc Nacionalista Valencià*	Valencian Nationalist Bloc	Progressivism, Valencian nationalism	European Free Alliance	Europeanism	Enric Morera	1	3	384**
Iniciativa del Poble Valencià*	Valencian Peoples' Initiative	Ecosocialism, Left-wing, Valencianism		Europeanism	Mònica Oltra	0	2	384**
Els Verds - Esquerra Ecologista del País Valencià*	The Greens - Ecologist Left of the Valencian Country	Ecologism, left-wing		Europeanism	Carles Arnal	0	1	384**
Esquerra Unida del País Valencià	United Left of the Valencian Country	Eurocommunism, Left-wing, Federalism	European Left Party	Europeanism	Marga Sanz	1	5	162
Unión Progreso y Democracia	Union, Progress and Democracy	Social liberalism	None	Europeanism	Rafael Soriano	1	0	5
Els Verds del País Valencià	The Greens of the Valencian Country	Ecologism, left-wing	None (formerly European Green Party)	Europeanism	Joan Francesc Peris, Toni Roderic	1***	0	9
Units per Valéncia	United for Valencia	Valencianism, centre-right		Europeanism	Carles Choví	0	0	5
Esquerra Republicana del País Valencià	Republican Left of the Valencian Country	pro-independence, socialism, Social democracy, pancatalanism	European Free Alliance	Europeanism	Agustí Cerdà	0	0	6
España 2000	Spain 2000	Spanish Nationalism, Far-right	None	Euroscepticism	José Luis Roberto	0	0	4

(*)These parties are part of the Coalició Compromís.

(**) Counting all of the councillors of the parties members of Coalició Compromís.

(***) Counting the deputy obtained by Esquerra Unida del País Valencià in coalition with Els Verds del País Valencià.
