= Puig government =

The term Puig government may refer to:

- First government of Ximo Puig, the government of the Valencian Community under Ximo Puig from 2015 to 2019.
- Second government of Ximo Puig, the government of the Valencian Community under Ximo Puig from 2019.
