= Isaura Navarro =

Spanish politician (born 1973)

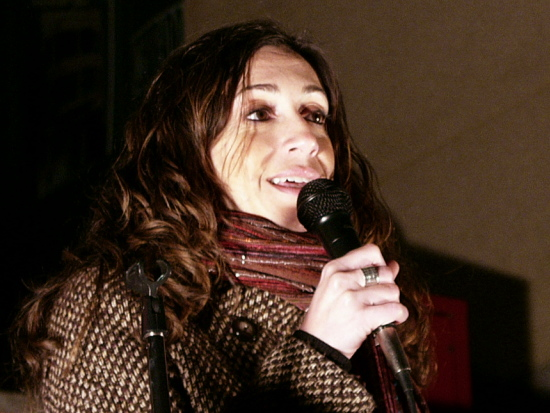
Isaura Navarro campaigning in Torrent during the 2008 General Election

Isaura Navarro Casillas (Valencian: [iˈzawɾa naˈvaro kaˈsiʎas]; born 5 November 1973, in Valencia, Spain), is a Spanish politician and former member of the Spanish Parliament. She holds a law degree obtained from the University of Valencia and specialises in business and labour law with a focus on worker's rights, due to obtaining the relevant qualifications in 1997. She has been the legal counsel of the Workers' Commissions Public Service and Public Administration Federation since the year 2000. In 2004 she was chosen to head the list of United Left in Valencia. With a drop in the overall United left vote, she won the 16th and final list seat, although a drop of less than 1800 votes would have cost her seat. In 2005 she became part of the federal praesidium of United Left. In the 2008 election she lost her seat to the People's Party. In 2015 she was elected to the Corts Valencianes, the Valencian autonomous parliament, as part of the Coalició Compromís list.

She lives in the Carmen district, the historic centre of Valencia, where she is active in the Residents Association, providing legal advice to the Commercial and Residential Association. She is also a member and supporter of Greenpeace.

== Politics ==
Navarro's main focus is on social issues, women and the environment. She is an opponent of the construction of the high speed AVE train in the Valencia region, arguing in the Cortes that it would be a train for the elite which would damage the environment and would harm the operation of conventional trains. She has been an active campaigner on gay, lesbian and transgender issues. She supports laws making it easier for people to officially leave the established churches. She also supports the decriminalisation of cannabis

== Controversies and Navarro's response ==
Navarro became involved in controversy following an official trip to Peru when she was alleged to have asked for an official car for her partner who was an international observer for the upcoming electoral process, as well as allowing him to participate in official dinners without the knowledge of the Spanish foreign ministry. He also took part in discussions with the Peruvian foreign minister where he was accused of dressing inadequately for the occasion and not behaving in the appropriate manner. Navarro denied she had acted improperly, stating that her partner was accredited as an International Observer by the Peruvian National Electoral Commission and that neither the Spanish Embassy nor Spanish Government had objected to his participation. Navarro subsequently alleged that during the South American trip, she and others had been spied on by the Colombian secret services during participation in a forum in Colombia.

She also sponsored a proposal which would have made Neighbourhood Watch schemes illegal on the grounds that these represented vigilantism, which is illegal in Spain.

The leadership of the Valencian Federation of United Left accused her of owing the organisation 10,000 Euros originating from her assets as a deputy. Navarro herself said she would not deposit the money, as she was part of an internal dispute between her internal tendency in IU and the Valencian leadership. She later paid her dues to the Federal Leadership of IU.

== 2008 General elections ==
In October 2007, she announced that she would be supporting Gaspar Llamazares' candidature for the nomination as Prime Ministerial candidate for IU in the 2008 Spanish general election stating that he would be the best non-sectarian candidate for all the left wing parties making up the coalition. As a result of divisions in IU, Navarro was challenged for the number one place on the Valencia list by Antonio Montalbán, with sections of the organisation hostile to the then leader Llamazares also opposed to Navarro's reselection. On 18 November 2007 at an Assembly held in Burjassot, Navarro was replaced as head of the Valencia list by Montalbán. The IU leadership later reviewed and upheld this decision. Consequently, Navarro left IU and stood in the election as head of the list for a broader coalition which included left wing, regional and environmental parties: the Valencian People's Initiative (Iniciativa del Poble Valencià), Valencian Nationalist Bloc (Bloc Nacionalista Valencià) and The Greens (Els Verds). However, the list polled only 1.33% of the votes cast, a drop compared to the 2004 election and, consequently, Navarro lost her seat.

== Subsequent career ==
Navarro unsuccessfully sought a place on the Coalició Compromís list for the 2011 Spanish general election.

During the 2011 to 2015 term, Navarro worked as a parliamentary adviser to Compromís leader Mònica Oltra. She stood in the primaries to be a Compromís candidate in the 2015 Valencian regional elections. She was placed 7th on the list for Valencia Province and was one of 10 Compromís candidates elected there.
