= A la valenciana =

The Valencian Way A la valenciana
- Founded: 13 May 2016
- Dissolved: 2 August 2016
- Merger of: Compromís; Podemos; EUPV
- Preceded by: És el moment
- Ideology: Progressivism; Valencianism; Ecologism
- Political position: Left-wing
- National affiliation: Unidos Podemos
- Slogan: La victòria de la gent ("Victory of the people")
- Members: See list of members

Website
- alavalenciana.org

A la valenciana (translated in English as "The Valencian Way"), officially named as Compromís–Podemos–EUPV: A la valenciana, was an electoral coalition formed by Coalició Compromís, Podemos and United Left of the Valencian Country in May 2016 to contest the 2016 Spanish general election in the autonomous community of Valencia. The alliance was the successor of the És el moment coalition that contested the 2015 general election.

The alliance name refers to the proposed coalition government offered by Podemos and Compromís to the PSOE in the Congress of Deputies. Such an offer was based on the agreement reached in the Valencian Community between the Socialist Party of the Valencian Country and Compromís, that made their leaders Ximo Puig and Mònica Oltra the regional premier and vice premier, respectively.

== Composition ==
Party
| Commitment Coalition (Compromís) |
| Valencian Nationalist Bloc (Bloc) |
| Valencian People's Initiative (IdPV) |
| Greens Equo of the Valencian Country (VerdsEquo) |
| People of Compromís (Gent) |
| We Can (Podemos/Podem) |
| United Left of the Valencian Country (EUPV) |

== Electoral performance ==
=== Cortes Generales ===
Cortes Generales
| Election | Valencian Community | | | | | | |
| Election | Congress | | | | | Senate | |
| Election | Votes | % | # | Seats | +/– | Seats | +/– |
| 2016 | 659,771 | 25.44% | 2nd | 9 / 33 | 0 (Note: Compared to És el moment totals in the 2015 general election.) | 3 / 12 | 2 |

== See also ==
- En Comú Podem
- En Marea
