= És el moment =

It is Time És el moment
- Founded: 6 November 2015
- Dissolved: 13 May 2016
- Succeeded by: A la valenciana
- Ideology: Progressivism; Valencianism; Ecologism
- Political position: Left-wing
- Slogan: És el moment ("It is time")
- Members: See list of members

Website
- eselmoment.com

És el moment (Valencian: [ˈez el moˈment]; 'It is Time'), also called Compromís–Podemos–És el moment, was an electoral alliance formed by Coalició Compromís and Podemos in November 2015 to contest the 2015 Spanish general election in the Valencian Community. United Left of the Valencian Country (EUPV) had also entered talks to enter the coalition, but left after disagreements with Podemos and Compromís. The alliance scored in second place in the Valencian Community in the 2015 election, only behind the People's Party (PP).

On 13 May, after EUPV joined the alliance ahead of the 2016 general election, the alliance merged into the newer A la valenciana coalition.

== History ==
Following the 2015 regional and local elections which saw parties to the left from centre sweeping to power to the regional government and across the most populated municipalities in the Valencian Community, Compromís co-spokesperson and Valencian People's Initiative (IdPV) leader, Mònica Oltra, favoured an electoral alliance between her party and Podemos ahead of the 2015 Spanish general election, on the condition that Compromís's own trademark was respected and that they were able to form a Valencian parliamentary group in the Congress of Deputies. By that time, Podemos leader Pablo Iglesias had also expressed interest in an alliance pact with Compromís in the Valencian Community, with his party's main requirements being the preservation of their own label and the holding of primaries at the constituency level.

The stance of the Valencian Nationalist Bloc—the largest party within Compromís—was against such alliance, with the party holding a non-binding vote on 5–12 August, asking its members whether the conditions approved by the party's executive a few days before (namely: that the Bloc led the lists, that Compromís's label was shown pre-eminently on the ballot; that they were to be allowed to form their own parliamentary group; and the pursuing of a "Valencian political agenda") were enough to negotiate an election agreement with other parties. Over a 23% turnout, 66% of those voting were favourable to the coalition talks which, up until then, were progressing "very satisfactorily". However, as a result of the low turnout, the Bloc's sector opposing negotiations demanded for it to be re-held, being made binding and with a clearer question, leading to a new vote being held on 12–19 September with two alternatives: that the Bloc ran under the Compromís label alone, or in alliance with Podemos "and/or other statewide political forces or similar platforms"–suggested the possible integration of United Left of the Valencian Country (EUPV) into the ticket–as long as the four previous conditions were respected. Under a turnout of 51.6%, 74% of Bloc members picked choice one. Podemos dubbed the results as an "internal affair" of Compromís while still trusting in the possibilities of reaching an alliance, whereas Mònica Oltra said that "the Bloc's stance cannot determine that of Compromís", threatening to sway the general council of Compromís—which had the ultimate say on the coalition's decisions—into supporting negotiations.

IdPV kept in talks with Podemos throughout September and, on 3 October, 81% of its members supported the unitary candidacy in an internal vote, but despite Podemos's willingness to attend the Bloc's required conditions, the latter remained reluctant to negotiate with a nationwide party, and specially because of not seeing guarantees for being allowed the formation of a parliamentary group of its own in the Congress. During the next ten days, the opposing stances of Bloc leader Enric Morera and Mònica Oltra on the issue of the alliance brought Compromís to the bring of fracture. On 31 October, in a final council meeting of the Compromís's leadership, and with IdPV and Greens Equo supportive of the alliance and the Bloc and People of Compromís (Gent) against, a decision was agreed to hold a new vote among the Bloc membership that was to decide either the party's integration within a platform of "Valencian obedience" that it would lead, open to Podemos and other progressive forces—such as EUPV or Republican Left of the Valencian Country (ERPV)—or it contesting the general election on its own, with the Bloc campaigning for the first option this time. This prompted both EUPV and ERPV to complain about not having received any firm proposal to join any such alliance, neither from Compromís nor from Podemos. Finally on 4 November, the choice in support of the Compromís–Podemos agreement won by a 76–24% margin among party members under a 42% turnout, but conditioned on attempting to seek EUPV's involvement into the alliance as well.

Contacts with EUPV ensued with just a few days left for the deadline to register electoral alliances to expire, but the hastiness of talks and Compromís–Podemos only making one offer to EUPV with few possibilities of renegotiation led the latter to drop out from any agreement and accuse the former parties of "intransigence" and "sectarianism". As a result, the Bloc supported the alliance between Compromís and Podemos alone, which was registered just before the legal deadline under the "Compromís–Podemos–És el moment" label.

== Composition ==
Party
Commitment Coalition (Compromís)
Valencian Nationalist Bloc (Bloc)
Valencian People's Initiative (IdPV)
Greens Equo of the Valencian Country (VerdsEquo)
People of Compromís (Gent)
We Can (Podemos/Podem)

== Electoral performance ==
=== Cortes Generales ===
Cortes Generales
Election	Valencian Community						
Election	Congress					Senate	
Election	Votes	%	#	Seats	+/–	Seats	+/–
2015	673,549	25.12%	2nd	9 / 32	8 (Note: Compared to Commitment Coalition totals in the 2011 general election.)	1 / 12	1
