= Arcadi España =

Spanish politician (born 1974)

The Most Excellent Arcadi España
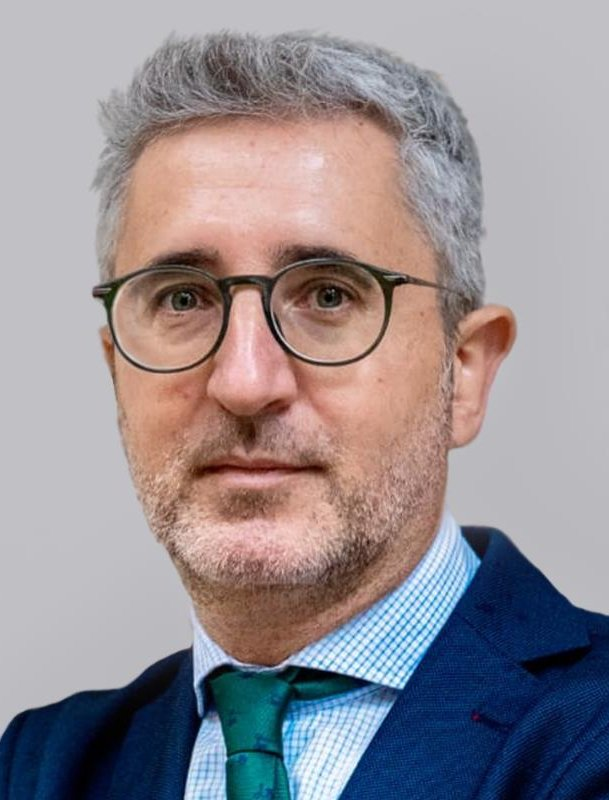
- España in 2026

Minister of Finance of Spain
- Incumbent
- Assumed office 27 March 2026
- Monarch: Felipe VI
- Prime Minister: Pedro Sánchez
- Preceded by: María Jesús Montero

Secretary of State for Territorial Administrations
- In office 6 December 2023 – 27 March 2026
- Preceded by: Alfredo González Gómez
- Succeeded by: Miryam Álvarez Páez

Regional Minister of Finance and Economic Model of the Valencian Community
- In office 14 May 2022 – 19 July 2023
- President: Ximo Puig
- Preceded by: Vicent Soler
- Succeeded by: Ruth Merino

Regional Minister of Territorial Policy, Public Works and Mobility of the Valencian Community
- In office 17 June 2019 – 14 May 2022
- President: Ximo Puig
- Preceded by: María José Salvador
- Succeeded by: Rebeca Torró

Personal details
- Born: 10 December 1974 (age 51) Carcaixent, Spain
- Party: Socialist Party of the Valencian Country
- Other political affiliations: Spanish Socialist Workers' Party
- Education: University of Valencia

Arcadi España García (born 10 December 1974) is a Spanish politician serving as minister of finance since 2026. From 2023 to 2026 he served as secretary of state for territorial administrations.

At regional level, during Ximo Puig's second term, he served as minister of finance and economy of the Valencian Community from 2022 to 2023 and as minister of territorial policy, public works and mobility of the Valencian Community from 2019 to 2022.
