= Héctor Illueca =

Spanish politician (born 1975)

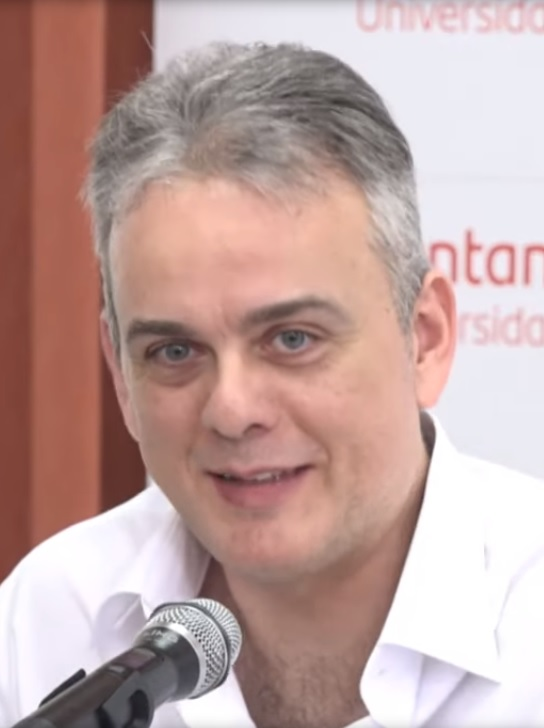

Second Vice President and Minister of Housing and Bioclimatic Architecture of the Generalitat Valenciana
- In office 10 September 2021 – 19 July 2023
- President: Ximo Puig
- Preceded by: Rubén Martínez Dalmau
- Succeeded by: Susana Camarero

Director-General of the Labour and Social Security Inspectorate
- In office 3 February 2020 – 9 September 2021
- Preceded by: María Soledad Serrano Ponz
- Succeeded by: Carmen Collado Rosique

Member of the Congress of Deputies
- In office 21 May 2019 – 21 January 2020
- Constituency: Valencia

Personal details
- Born: 8 August 1975 (age 50) Valencia, Spain
- Occupation: Labour inspector, politician

Héctor Illueca Ballester (born 8 August 1975) is a Spanish labour inspector and politician. He served as Director of the Labour and Social Security Inspectorate from February 2020 to September 2021.

Previously, he served as member of the 13th and 14th Congress of Deputies within the Confederal Unidas Podemos-En Comú Podem-Galicia en Común Parliamentary Group.

== Biography ==
Born on 8 August 1975 in Valencia, he earned a PhD in law at the University of Valencia (UV). Illueca —a labour inspector and professor at the UV— was a member of the Frente Cívico «Somos Mayoría», founded by Julio Anguita.

In 2018, he co-authored along Manolo Monereo and Julio Anguita a series of provocative pieces directing criticism towards the European Union while defending several measures taken by the Italian government of coalition between the Northern League and Five Star Movement that subsequently set a fierce intellectual controversy within the Spanish left-wing public sphere.

He ran as candidate to the Congress of Deputies vis-à-vis the 2019 general election, 1st in the Unidas Podemos list in the constituency of Valencia; he was elected and became a member of the 13th Congress of Deputies, joining the Confederal Unidas Podemos-En Comú Podem-Galicia en Común Parliamentary Group. On 30 July 2019 he was elected to chair the Committee on Labour, Migrations and Social Security of the Congress of Deputies.

On 21 January 2020, the labour minister Yolanda Díaz appointed him as Director-General of the Labour and Social Security Inspectorate, withdrawing from his position as member of parliament. He was sworn in on 3 February 2020.

== Works ==
Coauthored books

- Illueca Ballester, Héctor; Guamán Hernández, Adoración (2012). El huracán neoliberal. Una reforma liberal contra el trabajo. Sequitur.
- Monereo, Manolo; Illueca, Héctor (2015). Por un nuevo proyecto de país. El Viejo Topo.
- Monereo, Manolo; Illueca, Héctor (2017). España: un proyecto de liberación. El Viejo Topo.

Political offices
Preceded by Alberto Montero	Chair of the Committee on Labour, Migrations and Social Security of the Congress of Deputies; 2019	Succeeded by TBA
