= Raquel Tamarit =

Spanish politician (born 1978)

Raquel Tamarit i Iranzo
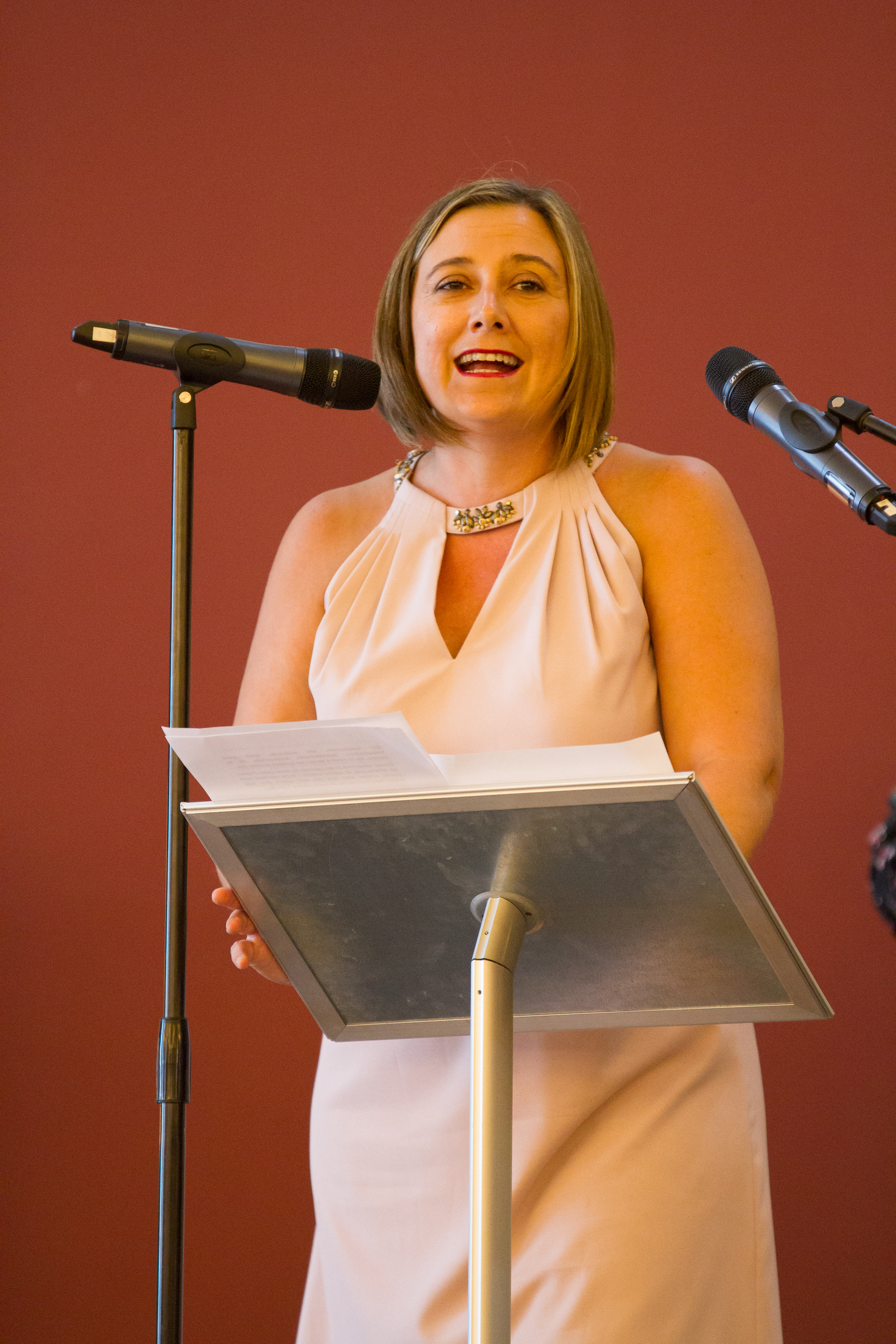
- Raquel Tamarit, then major of Sueca, at the awards ceremony of the 56th International Paella Contest of Sueca, 2016
- Born: 1978 (age 46–47); Sueca
- Occupation(s): Politician, teacher
- Known for: Valencian Ministry of Education, Culture and Sports (2022-)

Raquel Tamarit i Iranzo (Sueca, 1978) is a Valencian politician, Minister of Education, Culture and Sport of the Generalitat Valenciana, replacing the resigned Vicent Marzà since May 2022. She had previously been the Regional Secretary of Culture and Sport since 2019 and the mayor of Sueca (2015-2019).

== Biography ==
Tamarit has a degree in teaching. She began teaching in 2000 in various centers in Catalonia and the Valencian Community. In 2005 she joined the Valencian public education system and 5 years later her job got her job as a civil servant at the El Perelló de Sueca primary school, as an English language specialist.

As a politician, Raquel Tamarit began her membership in the Valencian student union Bloc d'Estudiants Agermanats (BEA) and in 1997 joined the Unitat del Poble Valencià (València's Peoples Union), now part of the Més-Compromís coalition where she is nowadays affiliated. She was elected a local Sueca councilor for the first time in the 2007 local elections where she managed the areas of education and youth in the local government chaired by Joan Baldoví, whom she highlighted in the 2015 elections as the head of the formation. In the 2019 local elections she repeated as head of the list and managed to be the most voted candidate, but a pact between the PSPV-PSOE, PP and Ciudadanos removed her from the mayoralty.

It was then, in July 2019, when Councilor Vicent Marzà appointed her as Regional Secretary of Culture and Sports of the Valencian Government, and she left the local council. In May 2022, she replaced Marzà as Minister of Education, Culture and Sports of the Generalitat Valenciana in the government headed by the Socialist Ximo Puig.
