= Tamarit =

Tamarit is a Catalan language surname. Notable people with the surname include:

- Francesc de Tamarit (1584–1653), Catalan military commander
- Raquel Tamarit (born 1978), Spanish politician
- Toni Tamarit (born 2005), Spanish footballer
- Xavi Tamarit (born 1982), Spanish football manager

== See also ==
- Tamarite de Litera (Tamarit de Llitera in Catalan), Spanish town in Aragon
