= Coalició Compromís =

Electoral alliance in Spain

- Spokespersons: Agueda Micó; Alberto Ibáñez; Natxo Serra Frontela
- Parliamentary spokesperson: Joan Baldoví (Corts Valencianes); Agueda Micó (Congress of Deputies); Alberto Ibáñez (Congress of Deputies)
- Founded: 25 January 2010
- Merger of: Valencian Nationalist Bloc (until 2021); Més–Compromís (since 2021); Valencian People's Initiative; Greens Equo of the Valencian Country
- Headquarters: Plaça del Pilar, 1; 46001 València, Spain
- Youth wing: Joves amb Compromís: Joves del País Valencià; Joves amb Iniciativa; Joves Verds Equo
- Membership (2019): ▲49,727
- Ideology: Valencianism; Progressivism; Republicanism (Spanish); Green politics; Faction: Valencian nationalism
- Political position: Left-wing
- National affiliation: European Spring (2014–2019); Commitment to Europe (2019–2020); Sumar (2023–2026); Senate of Progress (since 2026) (Note: In the Senate)
- Regional affiliation: És el moment (2015–2016); A la valenciana (2016); Més Compromís (2019–2023); Sumem per Guanyar (2023–2026); Valencian Front (since 2026)
- European affiliation: European Free Alliance (Més-Compromís); European Green Party (Greens Equo)
- European Parliament group: Greens/EFA
- Colours: Orange
- Congress of Deputies (Valencian seats): 2 / 33
- Senate (Valencian seats): 1 / 18
- European Parliament (Spanish seats): 1 / 61
- Valencian Parliament: 15 / 99
- Mayors: 54 / 542
- Town councillors: 662 / 5,716

Website
- compromis.net

Coalició Compromís ([koalisiˈo kompɾoˈmis], lit. 'Commitment Coalition' or 'Compromise Coalition'), also known as Compromís, is a Valencianist electoral coalition in the Valencian Community, Spain. The parties involved include Més-Compromís, the left-wing Valencian People's Initiative, and the ecologist group Greens Equo of the Valencian Country and independent members. Together, they support Valencianist, progressive and ecological politics.

Compromís was founded in January 2010 to participate in the 2011 elections to the Valencian parliament, and the 2011 local elections. Since the 2015 election year, Compromís has significantly increased its representation in many institutions. As of 2022, the party has 724 councillors all over the Valencian Autonomous Community, 17 parliamentary representatives in the Valencian parliament (Corts Valencianes), one representative in the Congress of Deputies of Spain and one in the Spanish Senate. In the past, it also had one representative in the European Parliament. In the 2015 local elections also has six representatives in the Deputation of Valencia (València), two in Castellón (Castelló), three in Alicante (Alacant) and 84 mayor's offices, among them, the capital city of Valencia.

== History ==
In the 2011 Valencian election, Compromís received 176,213 votes (7% of the votes) and 6 of the 99 seats.

In the 2011 Spanish general election, running in coalition with Equo in the three Valencian provinces, it won 0.5% of the national vote and 1 MP in Congress (Joan Baldoví), nearing 5% of the total vote in the Valencian Community.

In the 2014 European Parliament election it won 1 seat within the European Spring (Spanish: Primavera Europea) coalition with other parties (such as Chunta Aragonesista or Equo).

In the 2015 Valencian election, Compromís polled third overall after the People's Party (PP) and the Valencian Socialists (PSPV). Compromís got 456.823 votes (18.5% of the votes) and 19 of the 99 seats. The election results allowed a new government to be formed by Compromís and PSPV, with the parliamentary support of Podemos. After negotiations, Mònica Oltra from Compromís was elected as Vice president of Generalitat Valenciana and Ximo Puig from PSPV as President.

For the 2015 Spanish general election, Compromís formed a coalition with Podemos, called Compromís-Podem-És el moment. This new coalition was the second most popular political force in the Valencian Country, surpassing the PSPV. They received 671.071 votes, 25,09% of the total vote in the Valencian Country. During the process of creating parliamentary groups, Podemos deputies joined the group within other Podemos deputies from all around Spain, while Compromís joined the Mixed Group.

In the 2016 general elections in Spain, Compromís ran again in a coalition with Podemos, called A la valenciana ("The Valencian Way"), this time the coalition included as well United Left of the Valencian Country, the Valencian branch of United Left.

In the 2019 European Parliament election in Spain, it run as Commitment for Europe in coalition with Coalición Caballas, En Marea, Nueva Canarias, Més per Mallorca, Chunta Aragonesista, Partido Castellano-Tierra Comunera, Coalición por Melilla, Iniciativa del Pueblo Andaluz, Izquierda Andalucista, Verdes de Europa, not obtaining any representative.

In the 2019 Spanish local elections, they got 336 251 local votes and 724 local councillors, the 1.48% of the total amount of Spanish local councillors

It ran in the 2023 Spanish general election as part of the Sumar electoral coalition getting two MPs, Agueda Micó and Alberto Ibáñez.

In the 2024 European Parliament election in Spain ran as part of the Sumar electoral coalition getting one MEP, Vicent Marzà.

== Electoral performance ==
=== Corts Valencianes ===
Corts Valencianes
Election	Leading candidate	Votes	%	Seats	+/–	Government
2011	Enric Morera	176,213	7.19 (#3)	6 / 99	4	Opposition
2015	Mónica Oltra	456,823	18.46 (#3)	19 / 99	13	Coalition
2019	Mónica Oltra	443,640	16.68 (#4)	17 / 99	2	Coalition
2023	Joan Baldoví	357,989	14.51 (#3)	15 / 99	2	Opposition

=== Cortes Generales ===
Cortes Generales
Election	Congress					Senate		Status in legislature
Election	Vote	%	Score	Seats	+/–	Seats	+/–	Status in legislature
2011	125,306	0.5%	12th	1 / 350	1	0 / 208	0	Opposition
2015	Within És el moment			4 / 350	3	1 / 208	1	Snap election
2016	Within A la valenciana			4 / 350	0	1 / 208	0	Opposition
2019 (Apr)	173,821	0.7%	11th	1 / 350	3	0 / 208	1	Snap election
2019 (Nov)	Within Més Compromís			1 / 350	0	0 / 208	0	Confidence and supply
2023	Within Sumem per Guanyar			2 / 350	1	0 / 208	0	Confidence and supply

Election	Valencian Community						
Election	Congress					Senate	
Election	Vote	%	Score	Seats	+/–	Seats	+/–
2011	125,306	4.8%	5th	1 / 33	1	0 / 12	0
2015	Within És el moment			4 / 32	3	1 / 12	1
2016	Within A la valenciana			4 / 33	0	1 / 12	0
2019 (Apr)	173,821	6.5%	6th	1 / 32	3	0 / 12	1
2019 (Nov)	Within Més Compromís			1 / 32	0	0 / 12	0
2023	Within Sumem per Guanyar			2 / 33	1	0 / 12	0

=== European Parliament ===
European Parliament
Election	Total					Valencian Community		
Election	Vote	%	Score	Seats	+/–	Vote	%	Score
2014	Within PE			1 / 54	1	139,863	8.0%	6th
2019	Within CpE			0 / 59	1	193,419	8.4%	5th
2024	Within Sumar			1 / 61	1	151.015	7.7%	4th
