= Unidas Podemos =

Left-wing electoral alliance in Spain

United We Can Unidas Podemos
- Abbreviation: UP
- Founder: Pablo Iglesias (Podemos)
- Founded: 13 May 2016; 10 years ago (Unidos Podemos); 7 April 2019; 7 years ago (Unidas Podemos)
- Dissolved: 9 June 2023; 3 years ago
- Succeeded by: Sumar
- Headquarters: Madrid, Calle de la Princesa, 2, 28013
- Ideology: Democratic socialism Left-wing populism Republicanism; Federalism
- Political position: Left-wing to far-left
- Colours: Purple
- Slogan: La historia la escribes tú ('History is Written by You')

Election symbol

Website
- lasonrisadeunpais.es

Unidas Podemos (Spanish: [uˈniðas poˈðemos]), formerly called Unidos Podemos (Spanish: [uˈniðos poˈðemos]) and also known in English as United We Can, was a democratic socialist electoral alliance formed by Podemos, United Left, and other left-wing to far-left parties in May to contest the 2016 Spanish general election. The alliance's official pre-agreement was announced on 9 May 2016 after weeks of negotiations. It was re-styled to the feminine form of its name ahead of the April 2019 Spanish general election.

Part of the anti-austerity and anti-globalization movements, it advocated direct democracy, federalism, and republicanism in Spain. After the November 2019 Spanish general election, it formed a coalition government with the Spanish Socialist Workers' Party.

== History ==
=== Background ===
While campaigning for the 2015 Spanish general election, the United Left (IU) promoted the creation of, and later joined, the Now in Common (Ahora en Común, AeC) platform, seeking a wide alliance with other left-wing parties. After Podemos rejected invitations to join to what some members of this party called an "acronym soup", heightened after the failure of Catalunya Sí que es Pot in the 2015 Catalan election, the AeC platform gradually lost momentum: its founding members left the project and the brand name was lost. Eventually, the platform turned into the Popular Unity (IU-UPeC) electoral coalition without having fulfilled its initial aspirations.

=== Negotiations ===
From 20 April 2016, Podemos and Popular Unity were reported to be in negotiations to form a joint electoral list for the upcoming general election aimed at relegating the Spanish Socialist Workers' Party (PSOE) into third place. Leaders from both parties denied that any agreement had been reached and stated that they "would not do anything until it [the new election] was sure" but confirmed that unofficial talks had begun. More than one hundred intellectuals and artists, including El Gran Wyoming, Antonia San Juan, Carlos Bardem, Fernando Tejero, and Luis Tosar signed a manifesto calling for Podemos, IU, and their regional alliances to join forces for the coming election. On the other hand, some member parties of IU, such as Open Left, led by former IU leader Gaspar Llamazares, were opposed to the alliance from the beginning.

Among the supporters of such an alliance was one of Podemos' founders, Juan Carlos Monedero, who proposed that both parties should come together under the name "Podemos En Común" (Spanish for We Can In Common). Mayor of Barcelona Ada Colau also voiced her support for such a pact, stating, "I would see as positive that it could be put together, always with respect", her En Comú Podem regional alliance having already seen both parties working together in Catalonia. Valencian Vice President Mònica Oltra had also commented that she would see a Podemos–IU alliance as "good" so as to "make every vote count" and for "six million votes having a correct translation in deputies," in reference to the Spanish electoral system panning IU in the 2015 election.

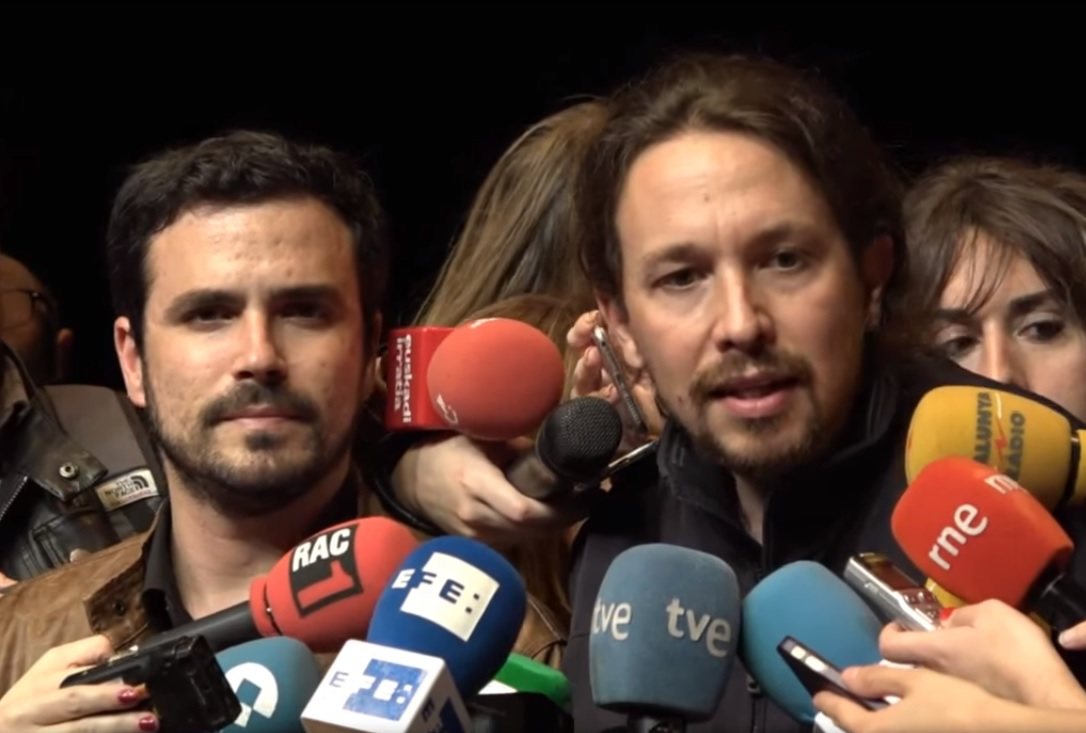
Iglesias Turrión and Garzón announcing their alliance ahead of the 2016 Spanish general election

By 30 April 2016, both Podemos and IU acknowledged that formal coalition talks had started and that, despite differences over the coalition name and the composition of party lists, discussions were continuing throughout the following week. Concurrently, IU submitted its plan for an alliance with Podemos to a membership vote held on 2–4 May, which received 85% of the vote in favour. Despite the ongoing negotiations on 4 May, Podemos and IU leaders took the coalition between both of their parties for granted, setting the People's Party (PP) as their main electoral rival and seeking to marginalise the PSOE. It was reported that both parties intended to formally announce their alliance during the 5th anniversary of the 15-M Movement.

On 9 May 2016, Pablo Iglesias Turrión of Podemos and Alberto Garzón of IU officially announced an alliance between their respective parties, with both leaders symbolically sealing their pact through an embrace at Puerta del Sol in Madrid, landmark of the 15-M movement. The pact guaranteed that 1/6 of the candidates obtained by the coalition—as planned and without including the regional coalitions En Comú Podem, En Marea, and És el moment—were to be awarded to IU candidates. In addition, the distinct identity of each party was to be preserved. Podemos, IU, and Equo put the alliance up to votes from their respective memberships on 10–11 May, all of which overwhelmingly supported the pact.

United Left referendum, 10–11 may
Choice	Votes	%
Yes	20,302	87.85
No	2,433	10.53
Invalid or blank votes	374	1.62
Total votes	23,109	100.00
Total census and turnout	72,041	32.08
Source: Podemos

Podemos referendum, 10–11 May
Choice	Votes	%
Yes	141,649	98.00
No	2,787	1.93
Invalid or blank votes	104	0.07
Total votes	144,540	100.00
Active voters and turnout	239,702	60.30
Total census and turnout	413,915	34.92
Source: Podemos

Equo referendum, 10–11 May
Choice	Votes	%
Yes	858	91.96
No	56	6.00
Invalid or blank votes	19	2.04
Total votes	933	100.00
Total census and turnout	3,394	27.49
Source: eldiario.es

On 13 May 2016, it was announced that the alliance would be named Unidos Podemos, Spanish for United We Can.

=== Other incorporations ===
Discussions between Podemos and Més per Mallorca (Més) started in the Balearic Islands by late April ahead of a prospective electoral alliance, aiming at forming a "grand coalition of the left" in the islands. Despite initial disagreements over Més's place in the Congress lists, both parties finally reached an agreement on 13 May 2016 to run together in the Balearics under the "Units Podem Més" label (Catalan for United We Can More).

Earlier, on 11 May 2016, Navarrese party Batzarre—from 2011 within the Izquierda-Ezkerra alliance with IU in Navarre—had voted for joining the Podemos–IU alliance. That same day, For a Fairer World (Por un Mundo más Justo, PUM+J), which had previously participated in left-wing alliances such as Ahora Madrid, had announced its intention to join the alliance with 61% of its members favouring the pact. Also joining the alliance was Zaragoza in Common (ZEC), the municipal alliance created for the 2015 municipal election in the city of Zaragoza and which went on to win the city's government.

=== 2016 general election ===
The results of the alliance between Podemos and IU were 'highly disappointing,' as Pablo Iglesias said on the electoral night; however, the alliance itself was called 'the right path.' Unidos Podemos got 71 seats, the same as in December, losing near 1.1 million votes.

=== 2019 general elections ===
In the April 2019 Spanish general election, the party lost 29 seats and fell to the 4th place in the Congress of Deputies, below Ciudadanos. In the November 2019 Spanish general election, the party lost 7 more seats, falling in 4th place, this time below Vox. It entered a coalition government with the PSOE.

=== 2019 European Parliament election ===
On 26 May 2018, Podemos announced that the name of the coalition for the 2019 European Parliament election in Spain would be Unidas Podemos cambiar Europa ("United We Can Change Europe").

== Composition ==
Party	Scope	Notes
We Can (Podemos)	Nationwide	
Building the Left–Socialist Alternative (CLI–AS)	Nationwide	Dissolved in 2018.
Popular Unity in Common (UPeC)	Nationwide	Dissolved in 2016.
Participatory Democracy (Participa)	Nationwide	Left in 2016.
Equo (Equo)	Nationwide	Left in September 2019.
Green Alliance (AV)	Nationwide	Formed in June 2021.
United Left (IU)	Nationwide	
Communist Party of Spain (PCE)	Nationwide	
The Dawn. Marxist Organization OM (La Aurora (om))	Nationwide	
Republican Left (IR)	Nationwide	
Open Left (IzAb)	Nationwide	Left in December 2018.
Feminist Party of Spain (PFE)	Nationwide	Expelled in February 2020.
Unitarian Candidacy of Workers (CUT)	Andalusia	Joined in 2018.
Initiative for El Hierro (IpH)	El Hierro	
Assembly (Batzarre)	Navarre	
Upper Aragon in Common (AltoAragón en Común)	Huesca	Formed in March 2018.
Segoviemos (SGV)	Segovia	Dissolved in December 2016
More for Mallorca (Més)	Balearic Islands	Left in February 2019.
Asturian Left (IAS)	Asturias	Left in 2016.
Castilian Left (IzCa)	Valladolid	Left in 2016.
Confluences
In Common We Can (ECP)	Catalonia	
Galicia in Common (GeC)	Galicia	Formed in March 2019.
En Marea (EM)	Galicia	Expelled in January 2019.
Valencian style (ALV)	Valencian Community	Dissolved in July 2016.

=== Ideology ===
The alliance is mostly dominated by the left-wing Podemos, but there are also further left factions, mostly arising from the United Left (IU) political coalition. Podemos is the only mainstream party that seriously questions the role of the monarchy and the Spanish constitution as it stands. The founder and former leader of Podemos, Pablo Iglesias Turrión, wants Catalonia to continue as part of Spain but says his party would respect the will of the 80% of Catalans who want a referendum, according to polls. The party has called for the release of jailed Catalan leaders on trial in Spain's Supreme Court. It is a coalition of other leftist parties, but the Communist Party of Spain (PCE) is the only member party that still runs at the national level.

Podemos presented a collaboratively written program for the 2014 European Parliament election in Spain. Some of the most important policies were emphasis on public control, poverty reduction, and social dignity via a basic income for everyone, including lobbying controls and punitive measures against tax avoidance by large corporations and multinational organizations, as well as promotion of smaller enterprises. It also included revoking or curtailing the Treaty of Lisbon, abandoning the memorandum of understanding, withdrawing from some free-trade area agreements, and promoting a referendum on any major constitutional reform. On environmentalism, it advocated reduction of fossil fuel consumption, promotion of public transport and renewable energy initiatives, reduction of industrial cash crop agriculture, and stimulating local food production by small and medium enterprises. The PCE is the main member of the United Left. In its statutes, the PCE defines its goals as "democratically participate in a revolutionary transformation of society and its political structures, overcoming the capitalist system and constructing socialism in the Spanish State, as a contribution to the transition to socialism worldwide, with our goals set in the realization of the emancipating ideal of communism."

In 2021, Unidas Podemos supported a motion by Más País to legalise the recreational use of cannabis in Spain.

== Electoral performance ==
=== Cortes Generales ===
Cortes Generales
Election	Leading candidate	Congress			Senate			Gov.
Election	Leading candidate	Votes	%	Seats	Votes	%	Seats	Gov.
2016	Pablo Iglesias	5,087,538	21.2 (#3)	71 / 350	12,786,779	19.6 (#3)	16 / 208	No (Note: 2016–2018.)
2016	Pablo Iglesias	5,087,538	21.2 (#3)	71 / 350	12,786,779	19.6 (#3)	16 / 208	(Note: Confidence and supply (2018–2019).)
Apr. 2019	Pablo Iglesias	3,751,145	14.3 (#4)	42 / 350	9,171,853	12.8 (#4)	0 / 208	—
Nov. 2019	Pablo Iglesias	3,119,364	12.9 (#4)	35 / 350	7,884,444	12.4 (#3)	0 / 208	Yes

=== European Parliament ===
European Parliament
Election	Leading candidate	Votes	%	Seats	EP Group
2019	María Eugenia Rodríguez Palop	2,258,857	10.1 (#4)	6 / 59	GUE/NGL; Greens/EFA

=== Results timeline ===
Year	(Spain) ES	(European Union) EU	(Andalusia) AN	(Aragon) AR	(Asturias) AS	(Canary Islands) CN	(Cantabria) CB	(Castilla–La Mancha) CM	(Castile and León) CL	(Catalonia) CT	(Ceuta) CE	(Extremadura) EX	(Galicia (Spain)) GL	(Balearic Islands) IB	RI	(Community of Madrid) MD	(Melilla) ML	(Region of Murcia) MC	(Navarre) NC	(Basque Country (autonomous community)) PV	(Valencian Community) CV
2016	**21.2**	N/A	N/A	N/A	N/A	N/A	N/A	N/A	N/A	N/A	N/A	N/A	**19.1**	N/A	N/A	N/A	N/A	N/A	N/A	**14.8**	N/A
2017	**21.2**	N/A	N/A	N/A	N/A	N/A	N/A	N/A	N/A	**7.5**	N/A	N/A	**19.1**	N/A	N/A	N/A	N/A	N/A	N/A	**14.8**	N/A
2018	**21.2**	N/A	**16.2**	N/A	N/A	N/A	N/A	N/A	N/A	**7.5**	N/A	N/A	**19.1**	N/A	N/A	N/A	N/A	N/A	N/A	**14.8**	N/A
2019	▼14.3	**10.1**	**16.2**	N/A	N/A	N/A	N/A	**6.9**	N/A	**7.5**	**1.5**	**7.2**	**19.1**	**9.7**	**6.7**	5.6	**1.2**	N/A	N/A	**14.8**	**8.1**
2019	▼12.9	**10.1**	**16.2**	N/A	N/A	N/A	N/A	**6.9**	N/A	**7.5**	**1.5**	**7.2**	**19.1**			5.6	**1.2**	N/A	N/A	**14.8**	
2020		**10.1**	**16.2**	N/A	N/A	N/A	N/A	**6.9**	N/A	**7.5**	**1.5**	**7.2**	▼3.9			5.6	**1.2**	N/A	N/A	▼8.1	
2021		**10.1**	**16.2**	N/A	N/A	N/A	N/A	**6.9**	N/A	▼6.9	**1.5**	**7.2**	▼3.9			▲**7.2**	**1.2**	N/A	N/A	▼8.1	
2022		**10.1**	▼7.7	N/A	N/A	N/A	N/A	**6.9**	**5.1**	▼6.9	**1.5**	**7.2**	▼3.9			▲**7.2**	**1.2**	N/A	N/A	▼8.1	
2023	N/A	**10.1**	▼7.7	N/A	N/A	**3.9**	**4.1**	▼4.1	**5.1**	▼6.9	N/A	▼6.0	▼3.9	▼4.4	▼5.1	▼4.8	N/A	**4.7**	**6.1**	▼8.1	▼3.6
Year	(Spain) ES	(European Union) EU	(Andalusia) AN	(Aragon) AR	(Asturias) AS	(Canary Islands) CN	(Cantabria) CB	(Castilla–La Mancha) CM	(Castile and León) CL	(Catalonia) CT	(Ceuta) CE	(Extremadura) EX	(Galicia (Spain)) GL	(Balearic Islands) IB	RI	(Community of Madrid) MD	(Melilla) ML	(Region of Murcia) MC	(Navarre) NC	(Basque Country (autonomous community)) PV	(Valencian Community) CV
**Bold** indicates best result to date. Present in legislature (in opposition); Junior coalition partner Senior coalition partner

== Symbols ==
Official logo, 2023

Campaign logo, 2019 European Parliament election

Official logo, 2019–2023

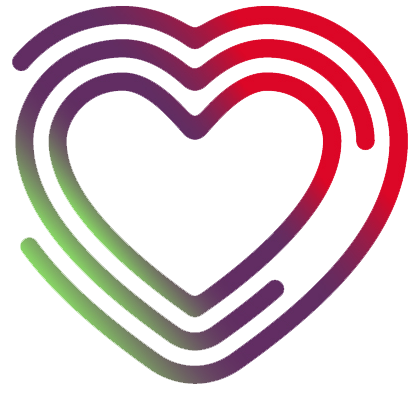
Campaign logo, 2019 general elections

Ballot logo, November 2019 general election

Ballot logo, April 2019 general election

Official logo, 2016–2019

Electoral logo, 2016 general election

Ballot logo, 2016 general election

Campaign logo, 2016 general election

== See also ==
- 2015–2016 Spanish government formation
- Opinion polling for the 2016 Spanish general election
- Opinion polling for the next Spanish general election
