= Alberto Ibáñez =

Spanish politician (born 1991)

Member of the Congress of Deputies
- Incumbent
- Assumed office 17 August 2023
- Constituency: Valencia

Personal details
- Born: 11 November 1991 (age 34)
- Party: Valencian People's Initiative

Alberto Ibáñez Mezquita (born 11 November 1991) is a Spanish politician serving as a member of the Congress of Deputies since 2023. He served as co-spokesperson of the Valencian People's Initiative from 2022 to 2026.
