= Rubén Martínez Dalmau =

Spanish teacher, jurist and politician

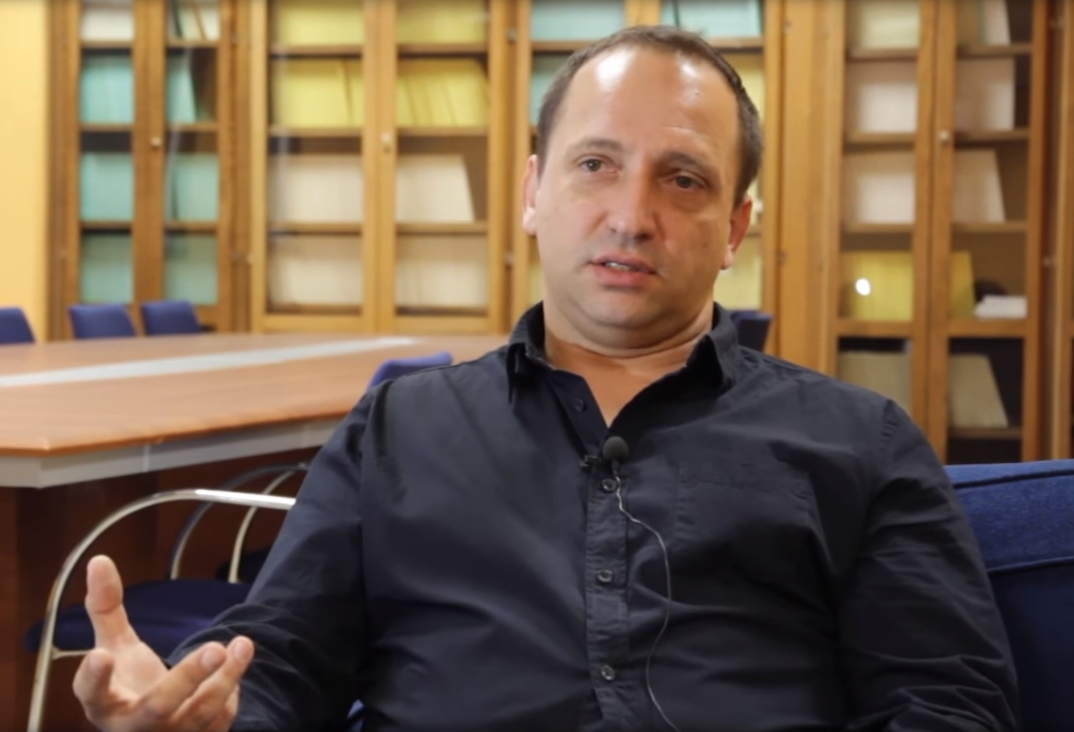

Second Vice President and Minister of Housing and Bioclimatic Architecture of the Generalitat Valenciana
- In office 17 June 2019 – 10 September 2021
- President: Ximo Puig
- Preceded by: Office created
- Succeeded by: Héctor Illueca

Personal details
- Born: Rubén Martínez Dalmau; 17 November 1970 (age 55) Teulada, Valencian Community, Spain
- Party: Podemos

Rubén Martínez Dalmau (born 17 November 1970) is a Spanish teacher, jurist and politician from Podemos and Second Vice President of the Generalitat Valenciana from June 2019 to September 2021.
