= Enric Morera i Català =

Spanish politician

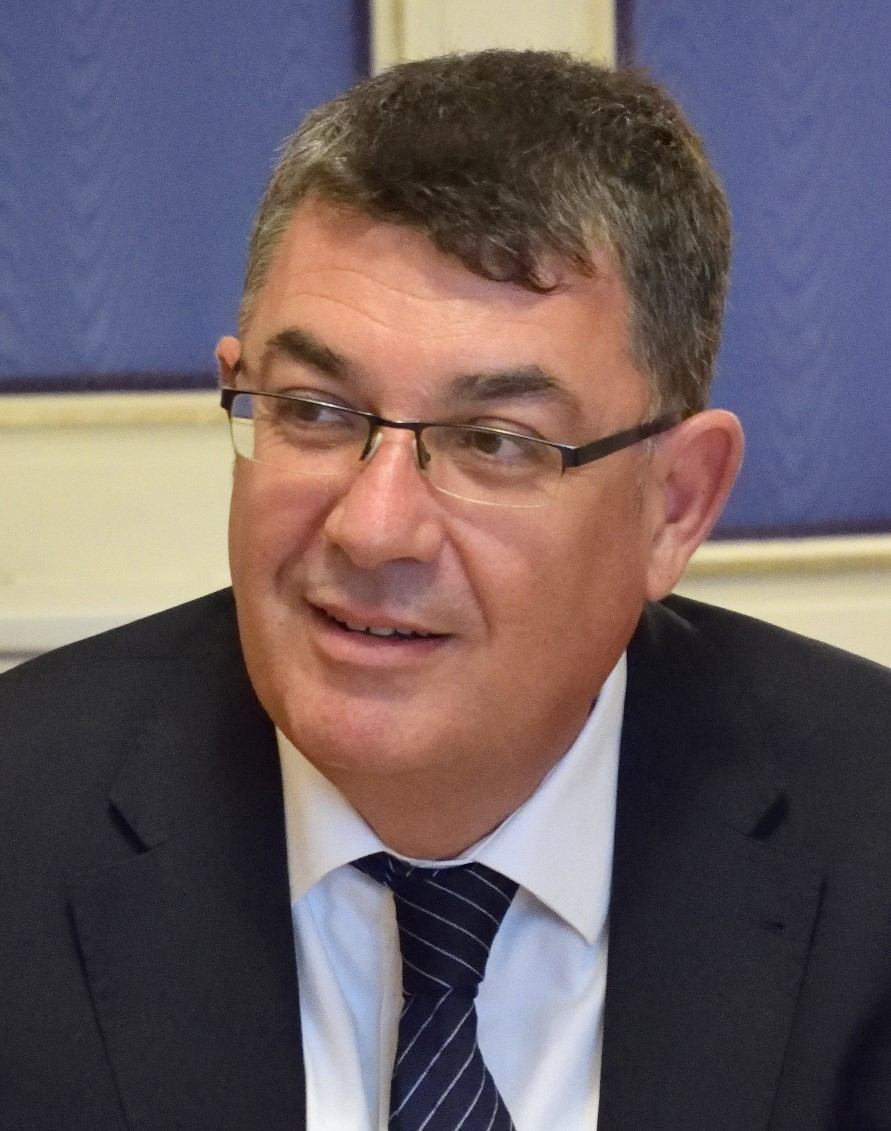
- Morera in 2018

President of Corts Valencianes
- In office 3 July 2015 – 26 June 2023
- Preceded by: Francesc Colomer
- Succeeded by: Llanos Massó

Senator of Spain
- Incumbent
- Assumed office 17 August 2023
- Appointed by: Valencian Corts

Co-spokesperson of Compromís
- In office 18 July 2012 – 1 July 2015 Serving with Mònica Oltra

Spokesman of Compromís in the Corts Valencianes
- In office 2010–2015
- Preceded by: Mònica Oltra Jarque
- Succeeded by: Mònica Oltra Jarque

General Secretary of the BLOC
- In office 2003–2016
- Succeeded by: Àgueda Micó

Deputy of the Corts Valencianes
- In office 14 June 2007 – 26 June 2023

Member of the European Parliament
- In office 19 April 2004 – 13 June 2004

Personal details
- Born: 3 April 1964 (age 62) Oliva, Spain
- Party: Més–Compromís (since 2021)
- Other political affiliations: Valencian Nationalist Bloc (1998–2021)
- Spouse: Tona Català
- Website: www.enricmorera.com

Enric Xavier Morera i Català (Valencian: [enˈrig moˈɾeɾaj kataˈla]; born 3 April 1964) is a Spanish politician who served as secretary-general of Més–Compromís and spokesperson for the Compromís coalition.

Morera was a Member of the European Parliament in 2004, as part of The Greens–European Free Alliance group, and since 2007 has been a member of the Valencian Parliament.

After 2015 Valencian parliamentary election, he was elected President of the Corts Valencianes, the Valencian Parliament, as a result of a pact formed by Compromís and the Socialist Party of the Valencian Country.
