= Gabriela Bravo =

Spanish politician

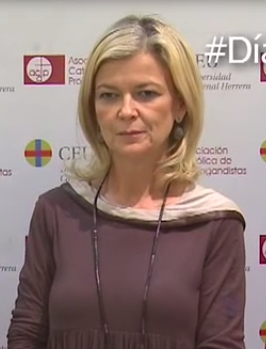
Gabriela Bravo in 2016.

Gabriela Bravo Sanestanislao (born 1963) is a Spanish politician who served as minister of justice, interior and public administration for the Valencian Community from 2019 to 2023 as part of the Second government of Ximo Puig.

In February 2025, she was awarded with the Silver Cross of the Order of Merit for Security.
