= 2015 Valencian regional election =

Election in the Spanish region of the Valencian Community

- 24 May 2015

All 99 seats in the Corts Valencianes 50 seats needed for a majority
- Opinion polls
- Registered: 3,609,265 ▲1.7%
- Turnout: 2,510,459 (69.6%) ▼0.6 pp
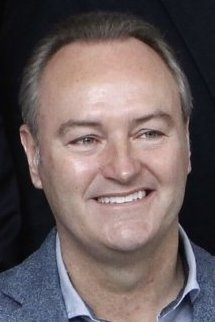

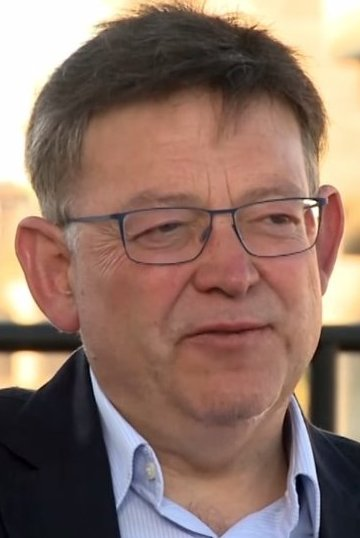

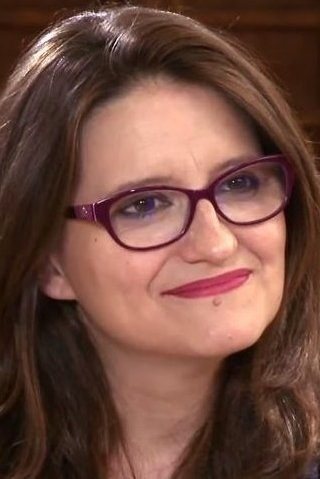

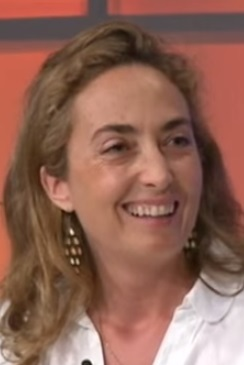

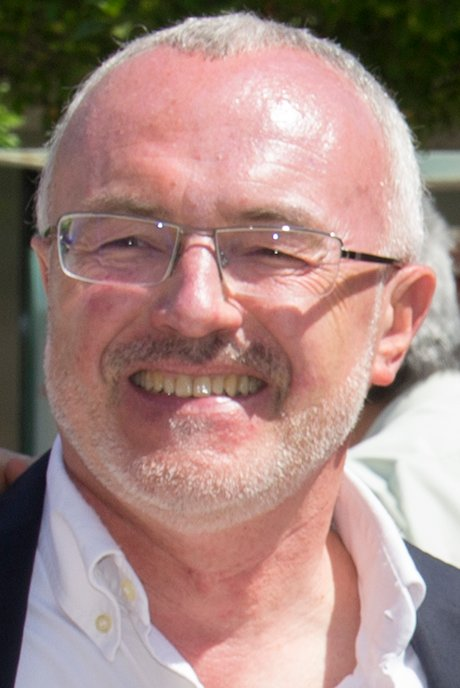

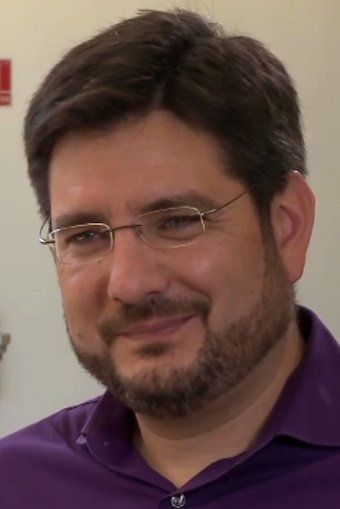
	First party	Second party	Third party
Leader	Alberto Fabra	Ximo Puig	Mónica Oltra
Party	PP	PSPV–PSOE	Compromís
Leader since	28 July 2011	31 March 2012	1 February 2015
Leader's seat	Valencia	Castellón	Valencia
Last election	55 seats, 49.4%	33 seats, 28.0%	6 seats, 7.2%
Seats won	31	23	19
Seat change	▼24	▼10	▲13
Popular vote	658,612	509,098	456,823
Percentage	26.6%	20.6%	18.5%
Swing	▼22.8 pp	▼7.4 pp	▲11.3 pp
	Fourth party	Fifth party	Sixth party
Leader	Carolina Punset	Antonio Montiel	Ignacio Blanco
Party	C's	Podemos/Podem	Acord Ciutadà
Leader since	2 February 2015	14 February 2015	8 November 2014
Leader's seat	Valencia	Valencia	Valencia (lost)
Last election	Did not contest	Did not contest	5 seats, 7.6% (Note: Results for EUPV (5.9%, 5 seats), VyE (1.3%, 0 seats) and ERPV (0.5%, 0 seats) in the 2011 election.)
Seats won	13	13	0
Seat change	▲13	▲13	▼5
Popular vote	309,121	282,389	106,917
Percentage	12.5%	11.4%	4.3%
Swing	New party	New party	▼3.3 pp
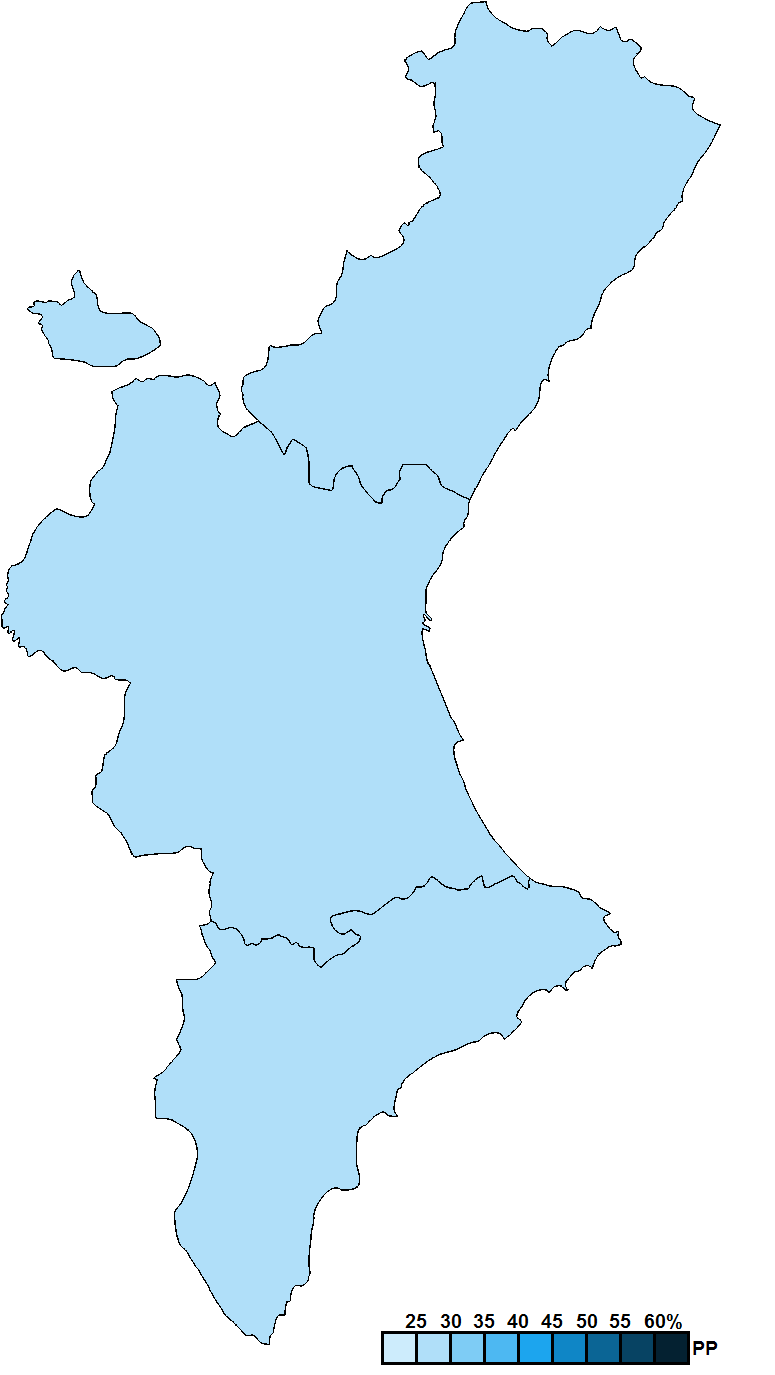
President before election
Alberto Fabra
PP
President after election
Ximo Puig
PSPV–PSOE

A regional election was held in the Valencian Community on 24 May 2015 to elect the 9th Corts of the autonomous community. All 99 seats in the Corts were up for election. It was held concurrently with regional elections in twelve other autonomous communities and local elections all across Spain.

While incumbent President Alberto Fabra's People's Party (PP) remained as the party with the most votes, it lost 24 seats and 22 percentage points compared to its 2011 result, losing the absolute majority it had held in the Corts since 1999. This result was attributed to the party's management of the economic crisis, as well as the various corruption scandals that affected the PP throughout the entire 2011–2015 period, some of which were unveiled just weeks before the election. The Socialist Party of the Valencian Country (PSPV–PSOE) came second, with 23 seats, 10 fewer than in 2011 and the worst electoral result in its history.

Three other parties achieved representation, of which two were newly formed since 2011: Commitment Coalition (Compromís), with 19 seats, Podemos and Citizens (C's). The Citizen Agreement, an electoral alliance led by United Left of the Valencian Country (EUPV), did not reach the minimum threshold of five percent of the regional vote to achieve representation and therefore lost all of its seats in the Corts. Turnout was, at 69.6%, the lowest since 1999. Subsequently, Alberto Fabra announced he would retire from his party's leadership in the region after a PSPV–Compromís coalition with Podemos' support expelled the PP from the regional government after 20 years in power. Ximo Puig from the PSPV–PSOE was elected as new regional president.

== Background ==
The 2011 regional election had resulted in the People's Party (PP) increasing its absolute majority despite losing votes, thanks to the collapse of the Socialist Party of the Valencian Country vote, which scored its worst historical result up to that point. However, after 16 years of uninterrupted rule, corruption scandals involving the PP began to erupt. Two months after the election, President Francisco Camps resigned because of his alleged implication in the Gürtel affair, being replaced as president of the Valencian Government by Alberto Fabra. The following years saw the unveiling of a series of corruption scandals that rocked the PP, involving party deputies, mayors, local councillors, two Corts's speakers and former regional president José Luis Olivas. At one point, about 20% of the party members in the Corts Valencianes—11 out of 55—were involved in various corruption cases; a joke popularized at the time said that they would become the third political force in the Corts, only behind PP and PSOE, if they were to form their own parliamentary group. The regional party leadership also had to cope with accusations of illegal financing, as well as possible embezzlement offences in the additional costs incurred in the Formula 1 project and Pope Benedict XVI's 2006 visit to Valencia.

At the same time, the regional government had to deal with the effects of an ongoing financial crisis. Despite the regional decision to ask for a bailout from the central government headed by Mariano Rajoy in July 2012, its economic situation remained severe. Fabra's government had to close down RTVV, the regional public television broadcasting channel, because of financing issues, a decision which was met with widespread protests.

The 2014 European Parliament election resulted in enormous losses for the PP, which, in the largest Valencian cities, lost almost half of its votes in percentage terms compared to the previous elections. Both the economic crisis and corruption scandals helped hasten the party's decline, which had already seen support drop in opinion polls since 2011. The Spanish Socialist Workers' Party found itself unable to gain any of the PP's lost support and lost votes too, to the benefit of until then minority parties such as United Left of the Valencian Country (EUPV), Union, Progress and Democracy (UPyD), Citizens (C's), Compromís or the newly created Podemos party.

== Overview ==
Under the 1982 Statute of Autonomy, the Corts Valencianes were the unicameral legislature of the Valencian Community, having legislative power in devolved matters, as well as the ability to grant or withdraw confidence from a regional president. The electoral and procedural rules were supplemented by national law provisions.

=== Date ===
The term of the Corts Valencianes expired four years after the date of their previous election, unless they were dissolved earlier. The election decree was required to be issued no later than 25 days before the scheduled expiration date of parliament and published on the following day in the Official Journal of the Valencian Government (DOGV), with election day taking place 54 days after the decree's publication. The previous election was held on 22 May 2011, which meant that the chamber's term would have expired on 22 May 2015. The election decree was required to be published in the DOGV no later than 28 April 2015, setting the latest possible date for election day on 21 June 2015.

The regional president had the prerogative to dissolve the Corts Valencianes at any given time and call a snap election, provided that no motion of no confidence was in process. In the event of an investiture process failing to elect a regional president within a two-month period from the first ballot, the Corts were to be automatically dissolved and a fresh election called.

The Corts Valencianes were officially dissolved on 31 March 2015 with the publication of the corresponding decree in the DOGV, setting election day for 24 May and scheduling for the chamber to reconvene on 11 June.

=== Electoral system ===
Voting for the Corts was based on universal suffrage, comprising all Spanish nationals over 18 years of age, registered in the Valencian Community and with full political rights, provided that they had not been deprived of the right to vote by a final sentence, nor were legally incapacitated. Additionally, non-resident citizens were required to apply for voting, a system known as "begged" voting (Spanish: Voto rogado).

The Corts Valencianes had a minimum of 99 seats, with the electoral law fixing its size at that number. All were elected in three multi-member constituencies—corresponding to the provinces of Alicante, Castellón and Valencia, each of which was assigned an initial minimum of 20 seats and the remaining 39 distributed in proportion to population (with the seat-to-population ratio in any given province not exceeding three times that of any other)—using the D'Hondt method and closed-list proportional voting, with a five percent-threshold of valid votes (including blank ballots) regionally.

As a result of the aforementioned allocation, each Corts constituency was entitled the following seats:

Seats	Constituencies
40	Valencia
35	Alicante
24	Castellón

The law did not provide for by-elections to fill vacant seats; instead, any vacancies arising after the proclamation of candidates and during the legislative term were filled by the next candidates on the party lists or, when required, by designated substitutes.

=== Outgoing parliament ===
The table below shows the composition of the parliamentary groups in the chamber at the time of dissolution.

Parliamentary composition in March 2015
Groups	Parties	Legislators	
Groups	Parties	Seats	Total
People's Parliamentary Group	PP	55	55
Socialist Parliamentary Group	PSPV–PSOE	33	33
Commitment Parliamentary Group	Bloc	3	6
Commitment Parliamentary Group	IdPV	2	6
Commitment Parliamentary Group	VerdsEquo	1	6
United Left Parliamentary Group	EUPV	5	5

== Parties and candidates ==
The electoral law allowed for parties and federations registered in the interior ministry, alliances and groupings of electors to present lists of candidates. Parties and federations intending to form an alliance were required to inform the relevant electoral commission within 10 days of the election call, whereas groupings of electors needed to secure the signature of at least one percent of the electorate in the constituencies for which they sought election, disallowing electors from signing for more than one list. Additionally, a balanced composition of men and women was required in the electoral lists, so that candidates of either sex made up at least 40 percent of the total composition.

Below is a list of the main parties and alliances which contested the election:

Candidacy	Parties and alliances	Leading candidate	Ideology	Previous result		Gov.	Ref.
Candidacy	Parties and alliances	Leading candidate	Ideology	Vote %	Seats	Gov.	Ref.
PP	List: People's Party (PP)	Alberto Fabra	Conservatism; Christian democracy	49.4%	55	Yes	
PSPV–PSOE	List: Socialist Party of the Valencian Country (PSPV–PSOE)	Ximo Puig	Social democracy	28.0%	33	No	
EUPV–EV– ERPV–AS	List: United Left of the Valencian Country (EUPV) – Communist Party of the Valencian Country (PCPV) – The Dawn Marxist Organization (La Aurora (OM)) – Republican Left (IR) – Open Left (IzAb); The Greens of the Valencian Country (EVPV); Republican Left of the Valencian Country (ERPV); Building the Left–Socialist Alternative (CLI–AS)	Ignacio Blanco	Valencianism; Democratic socialism Ecologism	7.6%	5	No	
Compromís	List: Valencian Nationalist Bloc (Bloc); Valencian People's Initiative (IdPV); Greens Equo of the Valencian Country (VerdsEquo)	Mónica Oltra	Valencianism; Progressivism; Green politics	7.2%	6	No	
Podemos/ Podem	List: We Can (Podemos/Podem)	Antonio Montiel	Left-wing populism Direct democracy Democratic socialism	Did not contest		No	
C's	List: Citizens–Party of the Citizenry (C's)	Carolina Punset	Liberalism	Did not contest		No	

== Opinion polls ==
The tables below list opinion polling results in reverse chronological order, showing the most recent first and using the dates when the survey fieldwork was done, as opposed to the date of publication. Where the fieldwork dates are unknown, the date of publication is given instead. The highest percentage figure in each polling survey is displayed with its background shaded in the leading party's colour. If a tie ensues, this is applied to the figures with the highest percentages. The "Lead" column on the right shows the percentage-point difference between the parties with the highest percentages in a poll.

=== Voting intention estimates ===
The table below lists weighted voting intention estimates. Refusals are generally excluded from the party vote percentages, while question wording and the treatment of "don't know" responses and those not intending to vote may vary between polling organisations. When available, seat projections determined by the polling organisations are displayed below (or in place of) the percentages in a smaller font; 50 seats were required for an absolute majority in the Corts Valencianes.

Color key:

Poll conducted after legal ban on opinion polls Exit poll

Polling firm/Commissioner	Fieldwork date	Sample size	Turnout	PP	PSPV	Compromís	AC	UPyD	Podemos/Podem	C's	Vox	Lead
2015 regional election	24 May 2015	—N/a	69.6	26.6; 31	20.6; 23	18.4; 19	4.3; 0	1.2; 0	11.4; 13	12.5; 13	0.4; 0	6.0
GfK/GVA	24 May 2015	15,864	?	31.2; 35/37	19.4; 22/23	15.5; 15/16	3.8; 0	–	11.5; 13/14	12.5; 13/14	–	11.8
GAD3/Antena 3	11–22 May 2015	?	?	? 33/35	? 22/24	? 13/15	–	–	? 12/13	? 13/15	–	?
JM&A/El Mundo	17 May 2015	?	69.6	29.5; 34	19.5; 22	8.5; 8	4.8; 0	1.1; 0	16.7; 18	15.7; 17	–	10.0
GAD3/ABC	17 May 2015	?	?	? 33/34	? 20/21	? 12/13	–	–	? 12/13	? 18/19	–	?
NC Report/La Razón	17 May 2015	800	?	32.6; 36/38	20.9; 23/25	8.7; 8/9	5.4; 4/5	1.5; 0	10.2; 11/12	15.7; 14/15	–	11.7
GIPEyOP	28 Apr–14 May 2015	977	?	30.0; 34	20.9; 25	13.4; 15	7.7; 8	4.3; 0	8.8; 8	9.0; 9	–	9.1
Sigma Dos/El Mundo	8–12 May 2015	1,200	?	31.2; 34/36	21.2; 24/25	9.5; 8/9	4.9; 0/5	–	13.0; 12/13	15.4; 16	–	10.0
Encuestamos	1–12 May 2015	600	?	26.1; 27/30	21.1; 24/27	11.5; 9/11	5.1; 0/3	1.1; 0	16.9; 17/19	14.8; 14/16	–	5.0
JM&A/El Mundo	10 May 2015	?	69.0	30.0; 33	19.7; 21	9.0; 9	5.1; 4	1.1; 0	16.2; 17	15.2; 15	–	10.3
KMC/Valencia Plaza	9 May 2015	?	?	27.2; 26/30	20.0; 20/22	10.3; 9/12	5.5; 0/6	1.0; 0	14.9; 14/16	18.6; 17/25	–	7.2
Invest Group/Levante-EMV	22 Apr–8 May 2015	1,600	74.5	24.7; 27	19.3; 20	13.2; 13	5.8; 6	–	13.5; 14	17.6; 19	–	5.4
Sigma Dos/Mediaset	4–7 May 2015	1,800	?	30.5; 33/34	20.7; 23/24	9.2; 8/9	5.2; 4/5	–	12.2; 11/13	16.8; 17	–	9.8
GAD3/ABC	29 Apr–5 May 2015	1,000	?	29.7; 32/33	19.5; 20/21	11.6; 12/13	4.2; 0	0.8; 0	12.2; 13/14	16.2; 19/20	–	10.2
JM&A/El Mundo	3 May 2015	?	69.3	28.7; 31	19.6; 21	8.8; 8	6.1; 6	0.9; 0	17.5; 18	14.7; 15	–	9.1
JM&A/El Mundo	26 Apr 2015	?	69.9	28.2; 31	19.8; 22	8.9; 8	5.8; 5	0.9; 0	17.5; 18	14.1; 15	–	8.4
Sigma Dos/Las Provincias	22–24 Apr 2015	1,200	?	29.7; 33	18.4; 19/22	12.2; 12/14	3.6; 0	1.0; 0	14.8; 15/16	16.1; 17	–	11.3
MyWord/Cadena SER	16–21 Apr 2015	1,218	?	26.5; 28/31	19.7; 22/26	10.8; 8/11	5.3; 3/5	1.0; 0	13.8; 13/15	18.1; 17/19	–	6.8
CIS	23 Mar–19 Apr 2015	1,955	?	30.4; 33/35	19.9; 22/23	8.1; 7/8	4.3; 0	1.5; 0	16.5; 19	15.3; 16	–	10.5
Metroscopia/El País	13–15 Apr 2015	1,500	72	24.5; 28	21.0; 23	10.9; 9	5.9; 5	–	16.9; 17	17.7; 17	–	3.5
Sigma Dos/El Mundo	26–28 Mar 2015	1,200	?	28.8; 30/32	19.5; 20/21	8.4; 8	6.8; 6	–	17.3; 17/19	15.2; 15/16	–	9.3
NC Report/La Razón	16–26 Mar 2015	800	?	35.2; 40/42	20.4; 23/25	8.2; 7/8	5.1; 3/4	2.1; 0	11.2; 11/12	13.4; 12/13	–	14.8
Sigma Dos/Las Provincias	13–17 Mar 2015	1,200	?	30.6; 33/36	19.4; 21/22	10.2; 9/10	5.2; 4	3.9; 0	14.3; 15/16	12.9; 14	–	11.2
ODEC/PSPV	1–15 Mar 2015	2,056	?	27.0– 27.5; 34	23.0– 23.9; 26/28	12.0– 12.5; 13	4.7– 4.9; 0	2.0– 2.4; 0	11.4– 12.0; 12	10.8– 11.6; 12/14	0.5– 0.6; 0	3.6– 4.0
PP	5 Mar 2015	?	?	? 37	? 24	? 6	–	–	? 20	? 12	–	?
ODEC/PSPV	21 Feb 2015	?	?	27.6– 28.2; 35	22.6– 23.8; 29	11.9– 12.1; 13	5.2– 6.0; 6	4.2– 4.9; 0	12.8– 13.0; 16	4.4– 4.7; 0	0.3– 0.4; 0	4.4– 5.0
PP	8 Feb 2015	?	?	30.0	17.0	10.0	5.0	5.0	20.0	9.0	–	?
JM&A/El Mundo	25 Jan 2015	?	68.7	30.8; 36/41	18.6; 22/24	8.5; 8/9	4.4; 0/4	4.1; 0/4	20.9; 23/25	3.9; 0/2	–	9.9
PP	4 Jan 2015	?	?	? 42	? 20	? 8/11	–	–	? 20	? 5/7	–	?
Llorente & Cuenca	31 Oct 2014	?	?	? 38/40	? 26/28	? 6/10	? 6/7	? 5/6	? 15/20	–	–	?
Inmerco/Valencia Plaza	6–16 Oct 2014	400	?	28.2	19.4	8.8	5.1	5.9	17.6	–	–	8.8
Sigma Dos/PP	15 Oct 2014	2,400	?	36.4; 41/43	20.0; 22/23	10.8; 10	6.2; 5/6	3.8; 0	16.3; 18/20	–	–	16.4
PP	26 Sep 2014	?	?	34.0– 37.0; 41/42	21.0– 22.0; 24/25	8.0– 9.0; 8	5.7; 6	5.1; 5/6	15.0; 13	–	–	13.0– 15.0
Metroscopia/El País	24–26 Sep 2014	1,500	71.5	29.9; 32	25.8; 29	13.0; 14	8.4; 7	3.0; 0	15.3; 17	–	–	4.1
PP	7 Sep 2014	?	?	27.0– 29.0	20.0– 22.0	–	–	–	17.0– 19.0	–	–	7.0
2014 EP election	25 May 2014	—N/a	49.1	29.0 (36)	21.6 (27)	7.9 (8)	10.6 (11)	8.5 (9)	8.2 (8)	2.9 (0)	1.7 (0)	7.4
ODEC/PSPV	27 Mar–2 Apr 2014	1,201	66.9	29.8; 32/34	27.4; 33/35	14.6; 16/17	10.2; 11/10	5.4; 4/5	–	–	–	2.4
La Vanguardia	30 Mar 2014	?	?	36.5; 42	26.6; 31	11.2; 12	9.9; 9	5.0; 5	–	–	–	9.9
MyWord/Cadena SER	6–12 Mar 2014	800	?	29.7	21.2	15.0	12.2	13.3	–	–	–	8.5
PP	5 Mar 2014	?	?	? 30/32	? 28/29	? 14/16	? 12/13	? 10/11	–	–	–	?
PP	12 Feb 2014	?	?	26.4; 29/30	28.6; 31/32	15.6; 16/17	13.1; 13/14	6.8; 7	–	–	–	2.2
ODEC/PSPV	17–19 Dec 2013	1,200	66	27.0– 29.5; 34/36	22.3– 24.7; 29/31	12.5– 13.5; 14/16	10.4– 11.1; 11	5.3– 8.1; 7	–	–	–	4.7– 4.8
NC Report/La Razón	15 Oct–12 Nov 2013	?	?	38.6; 39/40	20.6; 22/23	? 12/13	? 14/15	? 8/9	–	–	–	18.0
ODEC/eldiario.es	7 Nov 2013	1,200	?	37.2; 40	24.2; 28	12.1; 13	10.5; 11	8.6; 7	–	–	–	13.0
Metroscopia/El País	26 Sep–1 Oct 2013	1,000	63.7	33.9; 41	23.6; 27	13.3; 13	11.7; 13	6.9; 5	–	–	–	10.3
ODEC/PSPV	29 Jul 2013	?	?	30.4– 31.3	27.2– 28.6	12.6– 12.9	11.9– 12.2	6.1– 6.3	–	–	–	2.7– 3.2
PP	16 Jul 2013	?	?	31.0– 32.0	27.0– 28.0	–	–	–	–	–	–	4.0
Compromís	13 Jun 2013	?	?	? 38/39	? 22	? 18	? 13	? 7/8	–	–	–	?
NC Report/La Razón	15 Apr–10 May 2013	350	?	42.6; 44/45	20.8; 22/23	? 12/13	? 10/11	? 8/9	–	–	–	21.8
PP	8 Apr 2013	?	?	30.0	25.0	12.0– 15.0	15.0	7.0– 8.0	–	–	–	5.0
Compromís	27–29 Mar 2013	800	65	37.4; 37/39	22.9; 22/24	14.8; 13/15	10.8; 12/14	6.9; 7/9	–	–	–	14.5
Celeste-Tel (Note: "Una encuesta de Blanqueries da la mayoría absoluta al PP". La Razón (in Spanish). 30 November 2012.)	30 Nov 2012	?	?	? 50/51	? 19/21	? 12	? 15	? 3	–	–	–	?
ODEC/PSPV	17 Nov 2012	3,520	?	37.1	28.2	10.7	9.2	5.1	–	–	–	8.9
Celeste-Tel	22–31 Oct 2012	1,200	?	46.6; 50/51	19.2; 20/21	12.8; 13	10.1; 10	6.6; 5	–	–	–	27.4
Metroscopia/El País	1–5 Oct 2012	1,000	65	34.2; 42	19.9; 25	13.6; 13	11.5; 13	7.1; 6	–	–	–	14.3
PSPV	30 Sep 2012	?	?	? 49	? 31	? 8	? 6	? 5	–	–	–	?
2011 general election	20 Nov 2011	—N/a	74.2	53.3 (59)	26.8 (29)	4.8 (0)	6.5 (6)	5.6 (5)	–	–	–	26.5
2011 regional election	22 May 2011	—N/a	70.2	49.4; 55	28.0; 33	7.2; 6	5.9; 5	2.5; 0	–	–	–	21.4

=== Voting preferences ===
The table below lists raw, unweighted voting preferences.

Polling firm/Commissioner	Fieldwork date	Sample size	PP	PSPV	Compromís	AC	UPyD	Podemos/Podem	C's	Question	X mark	Lead
2015 regional election (Note: Does not include non-resident citizens.)	24 May 2015	—N/a	18.7	14.4	12.9	3.0	0.3	8.0	8.8	—N/a	28.9	4.3
Invest Group/Levante-EMV	22 Apr–8 May 2015	1,600	15.6	11.3	8.8	4.1	–	8.7	12.6	21.8	8.7	3.0
MyWord/Cadena SER	16–21 Apr 2015	1,218	8.8	6.9	12.8	2.2	1.3	12.5	15.1	30.6	5.4	2.3
CIS	23 Mar–19 Apr 2015	1,955	15.5	11.9	3.9	2.8	0.5	11.1	8.9	32.9	8.7	3.6
Metroscopia/El País	13–15 Apr 2015	1,500	13.5	11.0	6.7	3.3	0.8	10.2	8.8	37.3	6.5	2.5
Metroscopia/El País	24–26 Sep 2014	1,500	11.0	10.4	8.4	4.6	2.2	–	–	28.4	17.5	0.6
2014 EP election	25 May 2014	—N/a	14.2	10.6	3.9	5.9	4.2	4.0	1.4	—N/a	49.9	3.6
2011 general election	20 Nov 2011	—N/a	39.8	19.9	3.6	4.9	4.2	–	–	—N/a	24.5	19.9
2011 regional election	22 May 2011	—N/a	34.7	19.7	5.0	4.1	1.7	–	–	—N/a	28.5	15.0

=== Victory preferences ===
The table below lists opinion polling on the victory preferences for each party in the event of a general election taking place.

Polling firm/Commissioner	Fieldwork date	Sample size	PP	PSPV	Compromís	AC	UPyD	Podemos/Podem	C's	Other/ None	Question	Lead
Invest Group/Levante-EMV	22 Apr–8 May 2015	1,600	16.6	11.8	9.1	3.7	–	8.6	13.9	19.6	16.7	2.7
CIS	23 Mar–19 Apr 2015	1,955	19.2	16.7	4.8	3.1	1.3	12.0	10.5	24.8	7.7	2.5

=== Victory likelihood ===
The table below lists opinion polling on the perceived likelihood of victory for each party in the event of a regional election taking place.

Polling firm/Commissioner	Fieldwork date	Sample size	PP	PSPV	Compromís	UPyD	Podemos/Podem	C's	Other/ None	Question	Lead
Invest Group/Levante-EMV	22 Apr–8 May 2015	1,600	62.1	5.3	1.8	–	1.3	2.7	5.7	21.1	56.8
CIS	23 Mar–19 Apr 2015	1,955	63.5	9.1	0.6	0.0	2.4	0.4	23.0	0.9	54.4

=== Preferred President ===
The table below lists opinion polling on leader preferences to become president of the Valencian Government.

Polling firm/Commissioner	Fieldwork date	Sample size										Other/ None/ Not care	Question	Lead
Polling firm/Commissioner	Fieldwork date	Sample size	Fabra PP	Barberá PP	Puig PSPV	Morera Compromís	Oltra Compromís	Sanz EUPV	Blanco EUPV	Montiel Podemos	Punset C's	Other/ None/ Not care	Question	Lead
CIS	23 Mar–19 Apr 2015	1,955	19.5	–	9.8	–	11.1	–	1.7	3.1	2.5	4.2	48.1	8.4
Metroscopia/El País	24–26 Sep 2014	1,500	9.0	9.0	8.0	2.0	16.0	1.0	2.0	16.0	–	18.0	19.0	Tie
Metroscopia/El País	26 Sep–1 Oct 2013	1,000	13.0	12.0	7.0	3.0	16.0	2.0	–	–	–	24.0	23.0	3.0

== Results ==
=== Overall ===
← Summary of the 24 May 2015 Corts Valencianes election results →
Parties and alliances	Popular vote			Seats	
Parties and alliances	Votes	%	±pp	Total	+/−
People's Party (PP)	658,612	26.61	−22.81	31	−24
Socialist Party of the Valencian Country (PSPV–PSOE)	509,098	20.57	−7.47	23	−10
Commitment Coalition: Bloc–Initiative–Greens (Compromís)	456,823	18.46	+11.27	19	+13
Citizens–Party of the Citizenry (C's)	309,121	12.49	New	13	+13
We Can (Podemos/Podem)	282,389	11.41	New	13	+13
Citizen Agreement (EUPV–EV–ERPV–AS)^{1}	106,917	4.32	−3.33	0	−5
Union, Progress and Democracy (UPyD)	28,754	1.16	−1.32	0	±0
Animalist Party Against Mistreatment of Animals (PACMA)	19,781	0.80	+0.42	0	±0
Let's Win Valencian Country (Ganemos)	18,322	0.74	New	0	±0
Vox (Vox)	10,336	0.42	New	0	±0
Spain 2000 (E–2000)	7,509	0.30	−0.20	0	±0
We Are Valencian (SOMVAL)	6,835	0.28	New	0	±0
Spanish Phalanx of the CNSO (FE–JONS)	3,569	0.14	+0.09	0	±0
Communist Party of the Peoples of Spain (PCPE)	2,925	0.12	−0.02	0	±0
Zero Cuts (Recortes Cero)	2,906	0.12	New	0	±0
Citizens of Democratic Centre (CCD)	2,510	0.10	New	0	±0
Democratic People (Poble)	2,210	0.09	New	0	±0
Blank Seats (EB)	1,806	0.07	New	0	±0
Together (Junts)^{2}	1,476	0.06	+0.03	0	±0
United for Valencia (UxV)	1,438	0.06	−0.09	0	±0
Forward (Avant)	1,322	0.05	New	0	±0
Democratic Forum (FDEE)	1,310	0.05	New	0	±0
Libertarian Party (P–LIB)	1,219	0.05	New	0	±0
The Greens–The Ecologist Alternative (EV–AE)	1,149	0.05	New	0	±0
Citizen Hope (EsC)	1,129	0.05	New	0	±0
The National Coalition (LCN)	1,106	0.04	New	0	±0
Republican Social Movement (MSR)	603	0.02	New	0	±0
Blank ballots	34,083	1.38	−1.10		
Total	2,475,258			99	±0
Valid votes	2,475,258	98.60	+0.23		
Invalid votes	35,201	1.40	−0.23		
Votes cast / turnout	2,510,459	69.56	−0.63		
Abstentions	1,098,806	30.44	+0.63		
Registered voters	3,609,265				
Sources
Footnotes: ^{1} Citizen Agreement results are compared to the combined totals of United Left of the Valencian Country, Greens and Eco-pacifists and Republican Left of the Valencian Country in the 2011 election.; ^{2} Together results are compared to Valencian Nationalist Left–European Valencianist Party totals in the 2011 election.

Popular vote
PP	26.61%
PSPV–PSOE	20.57%
Compromís	18.46%
C's	12.49%
Podemos/Podem	11.41%
AC	4.32%
UPyD	1.16%
Others	3.61%
Blank ballots	1.38%

Seats
PP	31.31%
PSPV–PSOE	23.23%
Compromís	19.19%
C's	13.13%
Podemos/Podem	13.13%

=== Distribution by constituency ===
Constituency	PP		PSPV		Compr.		C's		Podemos	
Constituency	%	S	%	S	%	S	%	S	%	S
Alicante	27.7	11	22.7	9	12.5	5	14.1	5	12.2	5
Castellón	29.5	8	24.0	6	14.3	4	11.1	3	11.6	3
Valencia	25.3	12	18.6	8	22.9	10	11.8	5	10.9	5
Total	26.6	31	20.6	23	18.5	19	12.5	13	11.4	13

== Aftermath ==
=== Government formation ===
Investiture; Nomination of Ximo Puig (PSPV)
Ballot →	25 June 2015
Required majority →	50 out of 99
Yes: • PSPV (23); • Compromís (19); • Podemos (8)	50 / 99
No: • PP (31); • C's (13)	44 / 99
Abstentions: • Podemos (5)	5 / 99
Absentees	0 / 99

== Bibliography ==
- Ley 5/1983, de 30 de diciembre, del Consell (Law 5/1983). Official State Gazette (in Spanish). 30 December 1983 [version as of 23 March 2007]. BOE-A-1984-3460.
- Ley Orgánica 5/1985, de 19 de junio, del Régimen Electoral General (Organic Law 5/1985). Official State Gazette (in Spanish). 19 June 1985 [version as of 31 March 2015]. BOE-A-1985-11672.
- Ley 1/1987, de 31 de marzo, Electoral Valenciana (Law 1/1987). Official State Gazette (in Spanish). 31 March 1987 [version as of 6 April 1987]. BOE-A-1987-9636.
- Ley Orgánica 1/2006, de 10 de abril, de Reforma de la Ley Orgánica 5/1982, de 1 de julio, de Estatuto de Autonomía de la Comunidad Valenciana (Organic Law 1/2006). Official State Gazette (in Spanish). 10 April 2006 [version as of 17 July 2010]. BOE-A-1982-17235.
- Decreto 4/2015, de 30 de marzo, del presidente de la Generalitat, de disolución de les Corts y de convocatoria de elecciones a las mismas (PDF) (Decree 4/2015). Official Journal of the Valencian Government (in Spanish). 30 March 2015.
