= Vicent Marzà =

Spanish politician

Vicent Marzà MEP
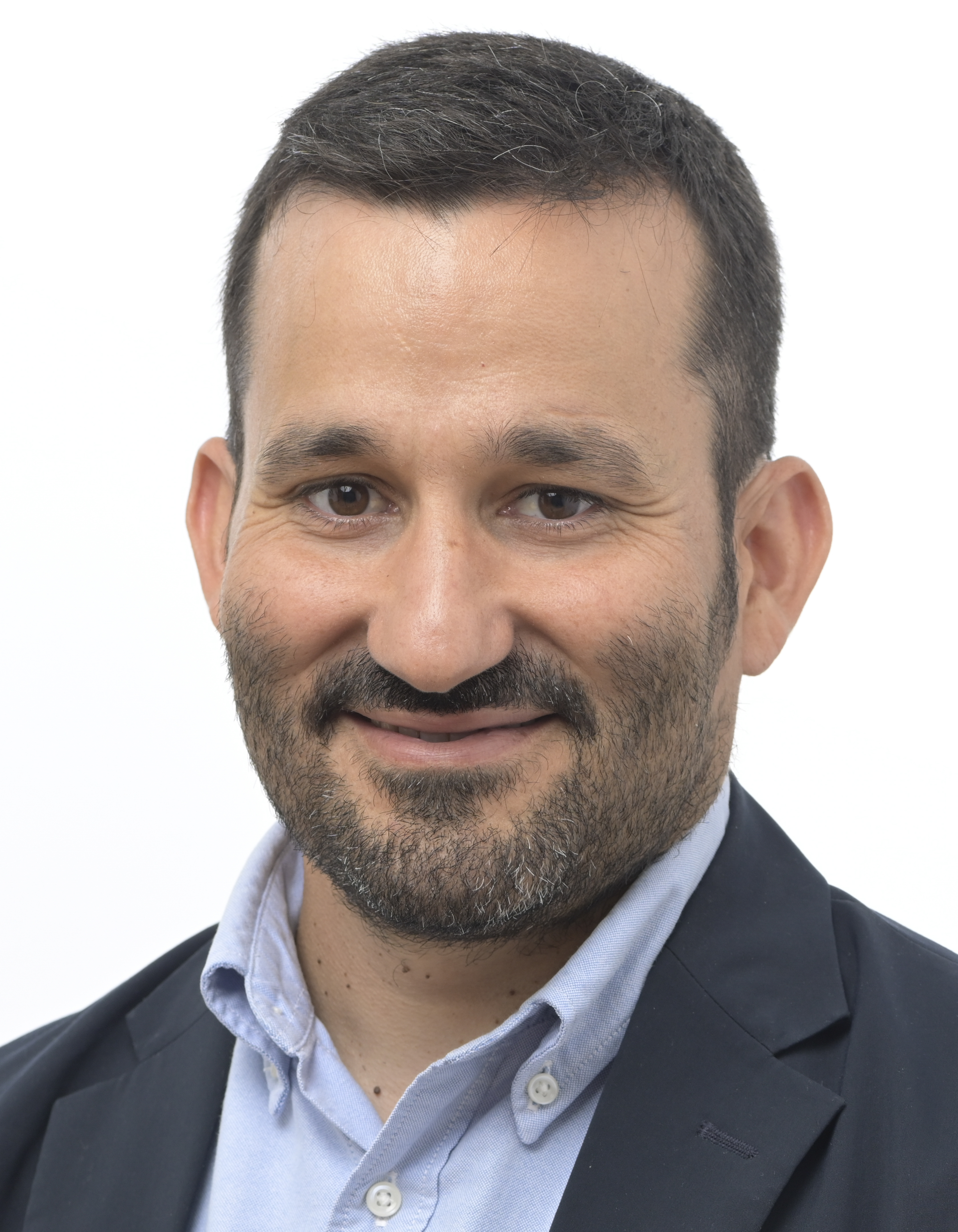
- Vicent Marzà in 2024

Member of the European Parliament
- Incumbent
- Assumed office 16 July 2024
- Constituency: Spain

Personal details
- Born: Vicent Marzà i Ibáñez; 1983 (age 42–43) Castellón de la Plana, Spain
- Party: Més–Compromís
- Occupation: teacher and politician
- Known for: Former Minister of Education, Culture and Sports of the Valencian Government

Vicent Marzà i Ibáñez (Valencian: [viˈsɛm maɾˈza]; Castelló de la Plana, March 3, 1983) is a Spanish teacher and politician, member of the Valencian Parliament for Compromís and member of Més–Compromís. Between 2015 and 2022 he was Minister of Education, Research, Culture and Sports of the Generalitat Valenciana.

== Biography ==
Marzà was born in Castellón de la Plana. A teacher by profession, Marzà holds a degree in teaching from the University of Valencia, specializing in English and French, and works at the Gaetà Huguet public school in Castelló de la Plana. In addition, he has a master's degree in leadership in socio-educational transformation and began an unfinished doctoral course, both at Ramon Llull University.

A lover of cycling and the son of parents who, together with other teachers, set up the first Valencian language school in Castelló, "la Censal", Vicent Marzà combined his teaching work with the participation in various social entities of Castelló. He is a person linked to Escola Valenciana and is a member of the Union of Education Workers of the Valencian Country (STEPV), which is the majority in the Valencian educational field. Marzà is also linked to various cultural groups such as the Conlloga-Muixeranga of Castelló de la Plana and is a member of the Colla el Pixaví.

In 2007 he was member of the regional list of Compromís for the Valencian Country. His militancy in left-wing Valencianism began in the early 2000s through the Bloc Jove and later became a member of the BLOC. He defends the unity of Catalan language and the public school and in Valencian.

Between 2015 and 2022 he was Minister of Education, Research, Culture and Sports of the Generalitat Valenciana. On May 11, 2022, he announced his resignation as a councilor to focus on the organic life of his party, being replaced by Raquel Tamarit.
