= Rebeca Torró =

Spanish politician (born 1981)

Organizational Secretary of the Spanish Socialist Workers' Party
- Incumbent
- Assumed office 5 July 2025
- Secretary-General: Pedro Sánchez
- Preceded by: Santos Cerdán

Personal details
- Born: 1 April 1981 (age 45)
- Party: Socialist Party of the Valencian Country

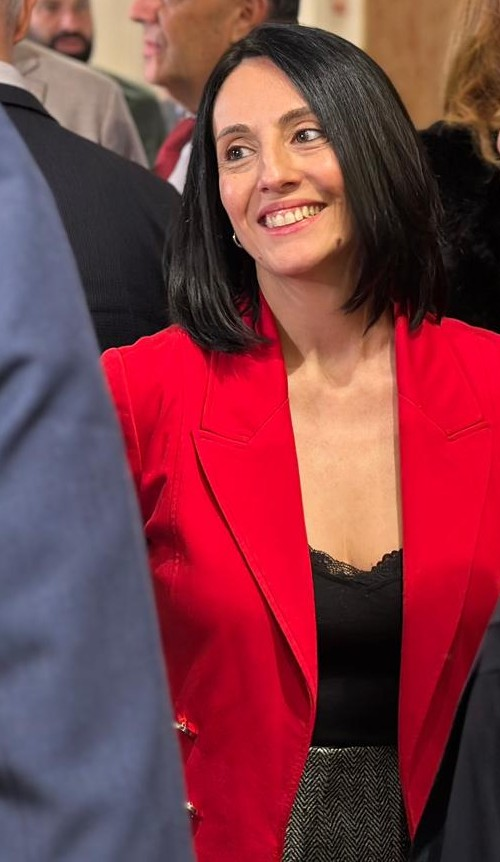

Rebeca Mariola Torró Soler (born 1 April 1981) is a Spanish politician serving as organizational secretary of the Spanish Socialist Workers' Party since 2025. From 2023 to 2025, she served as secretary of state for industry. From June to December 2023, she served as spokesperson of the Spanish Socialist Workers' Party in the Corts Valencianes. From 2022 to 2023, she served as minister of territorial policy, public works and mobility of the Valencian Community.
