= Joan Baldoví =

Spanish politician (born 1958)

Joan Baldoví i Roda MP
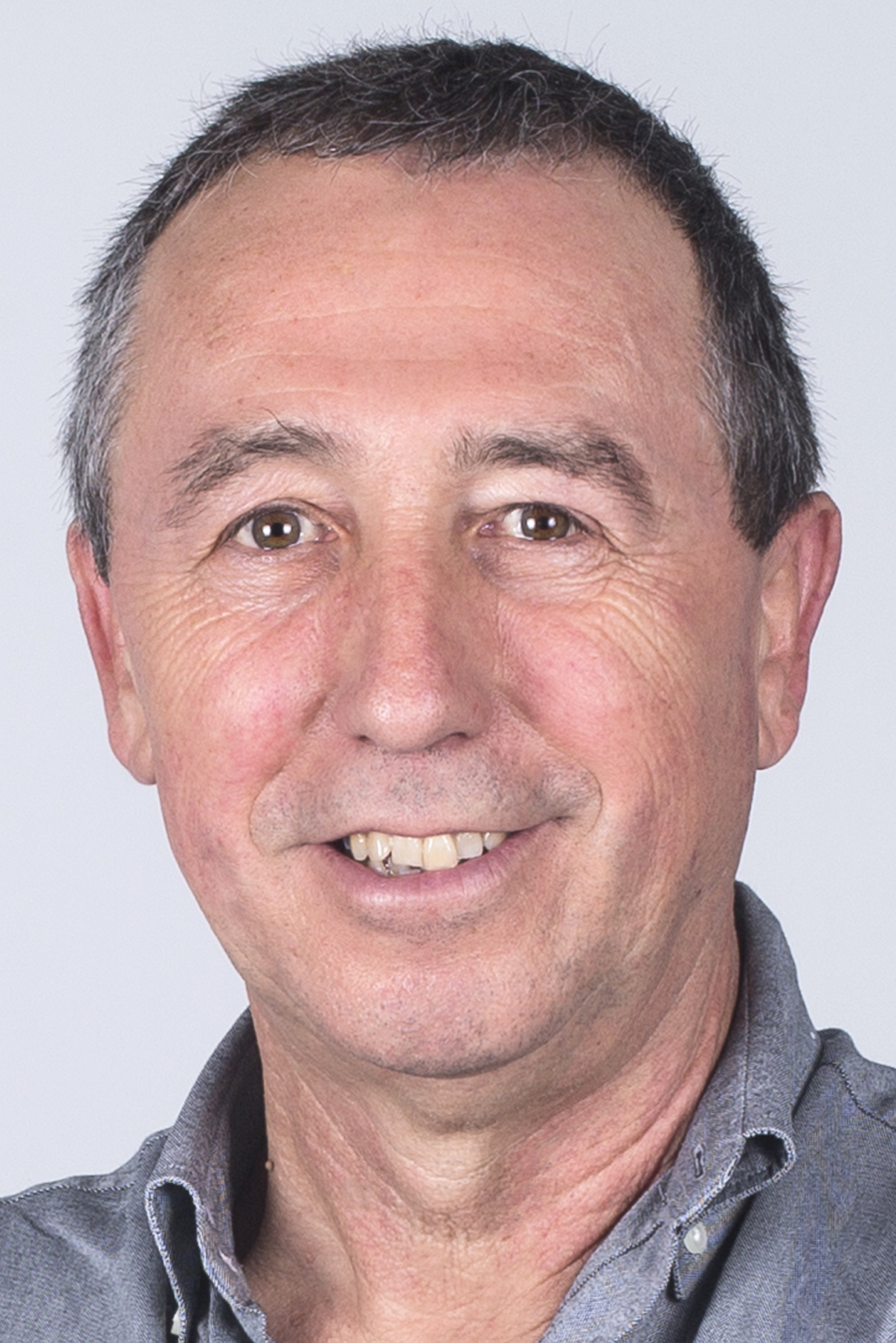
- Baldoví in 2016

Member of the Congress of Deputies
- Incumbent
- Assumed office 1 April 2011
- Constituency: Valencia

Personal details
- Born: Joan Baldoví Roda; 7 August 1958 (age 67) Sueca, Valencia, Spain
- Party: Més–Compromís (since 2021)
- Other political affiliations: Valencian Nationalist Bloc (until 2021)
- Joan Baldoví's voice Recorded on 23 January 2017

Joan Baldoví i Roda (Valencian: [dʒuˈam baldoˈviː ˈrɔða], also [ˈrɔðɔ]) born 7 August 1958 in Sueca, Valencia is a Spanish politician, who has represented Valencia Province in the Congress of Deputies since 2011.

Baldoví served as a local councillor for his hometown of Sueca for 14 years. He served as Mayor for the 2007 to 2011 term. He resigned from the council in January 2014, citing the difficulty of serving as a local and national politician simultaneously.

During his time in Congress, Baldoví attracted attention after removing his shirt and tie to reveal a t-shirt protesting against bankers. He called for reforms to the electoral system, a Freedom of information act and conducted experiments in direct democracy.
