= Més–Compromís =

- President: Joan Baldoví
- General Secretary: Amparo Piquer
- Founded: 27 June 2021
- Preceded by: Valencian Nationalist Bloc
- Headquarters: Sant Jacint 28, 46006 Valencia
- Youth wing: Joves del País Valencià
- Ideology: Valencian nationalism Progressivism; Ecologism
- Political position: Left-wing
- Regional affiliation: Coalició Compromís
- European affiliation: European Free Alliance
- European Parliament group: Greens–EFA
- Colours: Orange
- Congress of Deputies (Valencian Seats): 1 / 33
- Spanish Senate (Valencian Seats): 1 / 18
- European Parliament: 1 / 61
- Corts Valencianes: 9 / 99

Website
- mes.compromis.net

Més, also known as Més–Compromís (English: "More–Commitment"), is a Valencian nationalist party in the Valencian Community, Spain. It is the largest party in the Coalició Compromís since 2021, being created as a refoundation of the former Bloc Nacionalista Valencià.

When created, the party had as objective the national and popular construction of the Valencian Community, as well as improving the quality of life of the Valencian people. According to their promotors, the goal was to embrace a sovereigntist discourse with popular roots, thus allowing the new coalition to have a better presence than the Valencian Nationalist Bloc had. When it comes to the Valencian nationalist discourse, it promoted a more simplified vision of their ideology, for which they received internal criticism.

== Background ==
After a traumatic Spanish transition to democracy, Valencian nationalism became an extraparlamentary force when the Valencian Autonomous Community was created in 1982. This led to the main nationalist party, the Valencian People's Union, to moderate their positions in an attempt to find accommodation in the new political system. This accommodation would lead to the birth of the Valencian Nationalist Bloc, in a process known as Third Way, where the involvement of Valencian Nationalists into Catalan issues, that had been vague but real since the emergence of Joan Fuster as an intellectual leader, was abandoned and substituted by a discourse strictly based on the Land of Valencia. The failure of the Valencian Nationalist Bloc of reaching the parliament in the 2003 Valencian regional election, would led them to explore electoral coalitions with other leftists forces, in a process that would lead to the birth of Coalició Compromís.

During the process, the formation would evolve from a strict Valencian nationalism to a civic nationalism less centered on elements as language, culture, and history, understanding that Valencianism is originated in the will of the individuals. Also, Compromís become a catch-all party, and joined the Valencian government in 2015.

After the 2019 Valencian regional election, leaders of the Valencian Nationalist Bloc had a refundation in mind, justified by a need of abandoning the original name, regarded as not very attractive for the voters, and an adaptation to the ideological changes experimented during the last decade. The refundation was expected to happen in June, 2020, but the COVID-19 pandemic delayed the congress until 2021.

The refoundation happened in June 2021, despite receiving internal criticism for what had been regarded as an ideological renunciation. In November 2021, former president of both UPV and Bloc, Pere Mayor, announced he had left the party.

== Electoral performance ==
=== Corts Valencianes ===
Date	Votes			Seats		Status	Size
Date	#	%	±pp	#	±	Status	Size
2023	357 989	14.51%	-1.9	9 / 99	1	Opposition	***

- *** Within Compromís.

=== Cortes Generales ===
==== Valencian Community ====
Congress of Deputies
Date	Votes			Seats		Status	Size
Date	#	%	±pp	#	±	Status	Size
2023	402,813 (h)	15.23%	N/A	1 / 33	0	Confidence and supply	4th

Senate
Date	Seats		Size
Date	#	±	Size
2023	0 / 12	0	(h)

- (h) Within Sumem per Guanyar

=== European Parliament ===
Spain
Date	Votes			Seats		Size
Date	#	%	±pp	#	±	Size
2024 (f)	818,015	4.67%	N/A	1 / 54	1	5th

Valencian Community
Date	Votes			Size
Date	#	%	±pp	Size
2024 (f)	151,015	7.66%	-0.7	5th

- (f) Within Sumar
