= Mónica Oltra =

Spanish politician (born 1969)

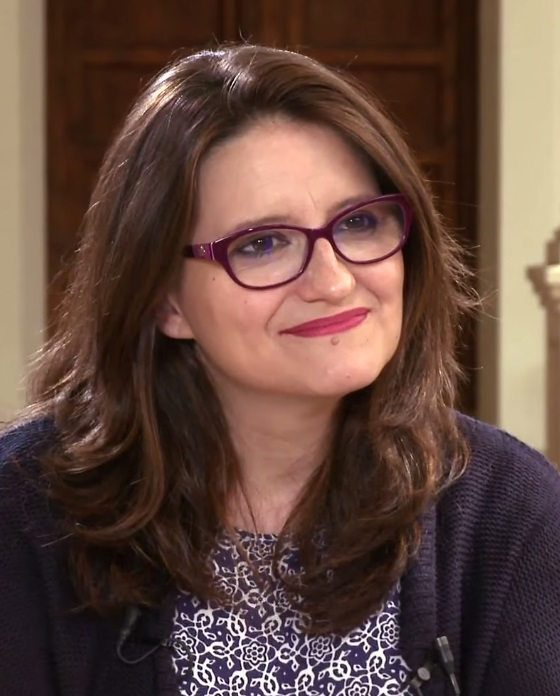
- Oltra in 2015

Co-spokesperson of Compromís (alongside Enric Morera)
- In office 2012–2022

Spokesperson of Compromís at Corts Valencianes
- In office 2007–2010
- Preceded by: Glòria Marcos
- Succeeded by: Enric Morera

Spokesperson of Valencian People's Initiative
- In office 2010–2014
- Succeeded by: Paco García Latorre; Mireia Mollà i Herrera; Miquel Real Antequera

Deputy at Corts Valencianes
- In office 2007–2022

First Vice president of the Generalitat Valenciana
- In office 2015–2022
- Preceded by: José Císcar

Minister for Equality and Inclusive Policies of Generalitat Valenciana
- In office 2015–2022
- Preceded by: Asunción Sánchez Zaplana

Spokesperson of the Generalitat Valenciana
- In office 2015–2022
- Preceded by: María José Català

Personal details
- Born: 20 December 1969 (age 56) Neuss, West Germany
- Party: IdPV-Compromís
- Website: monicaoltra2015.com

Mónica Oltra Jarque (Valencian: [ˈmonika ˈɔltɾa]) (Note: Her first name is sometimes given as Mònica [ˈmɔnika], which is the usual form of this name in Catalan.) is a Spanish left-wing politician, and the ex-vice president, ex-spokesperson and ex-minister for Equality and Inclusive Policies of the Valencian government.

Born in Germany to a Spanish immigrants family, she returned to Spain in 1984 and shortly after joined the Communist Party of Spain.

Mónica Oltra has served as one of the main leaders of the political party Valencian People's Initiative (IdPV) and of Coalició Compromís (Commitment Coalition), a coalition which she has represented in the Valencian parliament, representing the province of Valencia since 2007 until her resignation in 2022. She holds a bachelor's degree in Law from the University of Valencia. Alongside being a politician, she also works as a lawyer.

In June 2022 she was accused by José Luis Roberto Navarro, a known valencian far-right wing activist, of covering up the case of sexual abuse by her ex-husband of a 14 years old minor under guardianship. Despite the pressure, she initially refused to resign her position of the vice-president of Valencian government. However, after PSOE-Valencia threatened to break the governing Botanic coalition, she resigned on 21 June. In June 2023, the judicial police released a report that allegedly supports Oltra's version that no cover-up had occurred and in April 2024, the tribunal ruled that there were not any evidence and filed the case. Despite the previous rulings, she's currently being judged for the alleged cover-up.
