= Valencian People's Initiative =

Valencian People's Initiative: Iniciativa del Poble Valencià
- Spokesperson: Carles Esteve
- Founded: 2007
- Split from: United Left of the Valencian Country
- Headquarters: C/ Guillem de Castro, 83 (València)
- Youth wing: Joves amb Iniciativa
- Ideology: Valencianism; Eco-socialism; Green politics; Federalism
- Political position: Left-wing
- Regional affiliation: Coalició Compromís
- Colors: Crimson
- Congress (Valencian seats): 1 / 33 Inside Compromís-Sumar
- Senate (Valencian seats): 0 / 18
- Valencian Parliament: 4 / 99 Inside Compromís

Website
- iniciativa.compromis.net

Valencian People's Initiative (Valencian: Iniciativa del Poble Valencià, IdPV), also known as Iniciativa or Iniciativa-Compromís, is a Valencianist and ecosocialist political party, in the Valencian Country, Spain. IdPV is one of the parties that makes up the Compromís coalition.

Iniciativa has its origin in Esquerra i País, an internal current of Esquerra Unida del País Valencià (EUPV) —the section of the 'United Left' (Izquierda Unida, IU) in the Valencian Community— which represented around 30% of the organization, and which was constituted as a political party on October 20, 2007, in the midst of the crisis in EUPV that pitted the majority sector —formed around the Communist Party of the Valencian Country and the general coordinator Glòria Marcos— with the critics closest to Valencian Nationalism.

== Ideology ==
According to one of its leaders, Pasqual Mollà, IdPV is an "ecosocialist and Valencianist" party. According to the documents of its founding congress, IdPV is "a political alternative to the left of classical social democracy". IdPV has received a lot of support from Initiative for Catalonia Greens, a very similar party that exists in Catalonia.

== History ==
IdPV was founded after Esquerra i país (Left and Country), an internal current of United Left of the Valencian Country (EUPV), created a new political party. IdPV left EUPV in 2008.
