= Ximo Puig =

Spanish politician

The Right Honourable Ximo Puig
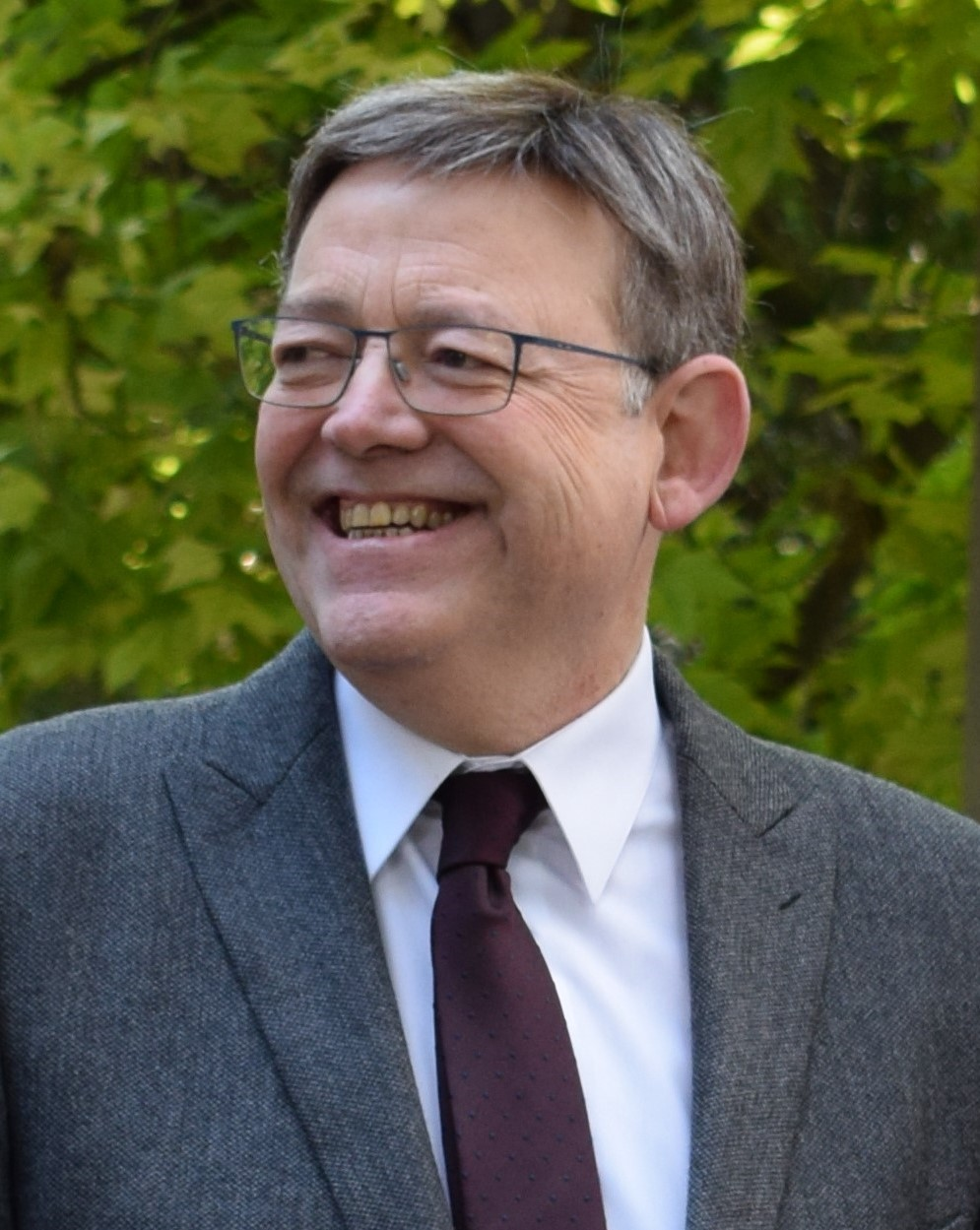

President of the Valencian Government
- In office 25 June 2015 – 13 July 2023
- Monarch: Felipe VI
- Preceded by: Alberto Fabra
- Succeeded by: Carlos Mazón

Secretary-General of the Socialist Party of the Valencian Country
- In office 30 March 2012 – 24 March 2024
- Preceded by: Jorge Alarte
- Succeeded by: Diana Morant

Member of the Congress of Deputies
- In office 13 December 2011 – 3 June 2015
- Constituency: Castellón

Member of the Corts Valencianes
- Incumbent
- Assumed office 11 June 2015
- Constituency: Castellón
- In office 13 July 1999 – 22 May 2011
- Constituency: Castellón
- In office 7 June 1983 – 17 April 1986
- Constituency: Castellón

Member of the Senate
- Incumbent
- Assumed office 17 August 2023
- Constituency: Corts Valencianes

Personal details
- Born: Joaquín Francisco Puig Ferrer; 4 January 1959 (age 67) Morella, Valencian Community, Spain
- Party: PSPV-PSOE
- Children: 2
- Occupation: Journalist, politician

Joaquín Francisco Puig Ferrer (born 4 January 1959), known as Ximo Puig (Valencian: [ˈtʃimo ˈputʃ]), is a Spanish politician who served as President of the Valencian Government from 2015 to 2023. He was also the leader of the Socialist Party of the Valencian Country (PSPV-PSOE), the Valencian regional branch of the PSOE, from 2012 to 2024.

== Life and career ==
Puig was born in Morella, Castellón. A journalist by profession, he worked for local newspapers and for the Antena 3 radio station. He was elected to the Corts Valencianes, the Valencian regional parliament, in the first democratic elections in 1983. He resigned his seat in 1986, when he was appointed Director General of Institutional relations and information in the Valencian regional administration, serving until 1995.

In May 1995 he became mayor of his hometown of Morella, serving until 2012, when he resigned after becoming leader of the PSPV-PSOE. In the 2011 Spanish general election he was elected to the Congress of Deputies, representing Castellón Province. In Congress, he served as spokesman for the committee on industry, energy and tourism. In March 2014 Puig won the PSPV-PSOE primary to be the party's candidate for President of the Valencian Government in the 2015 regional elections. He received 68.8% of the votes in the primary.

On 25 June 2015, he was invested President of the Valencian Government with the favourable votes of PSPV-PSOE, Podemos and Compromís, succeeding Alberto Fabra and putting an end to two decades of PP governments in the region. He was re-elected for a second term, with the support of the same parties, on 13 June 2019.

Political offices
Preceded by Javier Fabregat	Mayor of Morella; 1995–2012	Succeeded by Rhmasés Ripollés
Preceded by Antonio Moreno	Second Vice-President of Corts Valencianes; 2003–2007	Succeeded by Isabel Escudero Pitarch
Preceded by Alberto Fabra	President of the Valencian Government; 2015–2023	Succeeded by Carlos Mazón
Party political offices
Preceded by Antonio Moreno	Leader of the Socialist Group in Corts Valencianes; 2000–2003	Succeeded by Joan Ignasi Pla
Preceded by Jorge Alarte	Secretary-General of the Socialist Party of the Valencian Country; 2012–2024	Succeeded by Diana Morant
Incumbent
