= 2026 Spanish general election =

- 29 November 2026

All 350 seats in the Congress of Deputies and 209 (of 267) seats in the Senate 176 seats needed for a majority in the Congress of Deputies
- Opinion polls
- Registered: 38,728,356 ▲3.4%
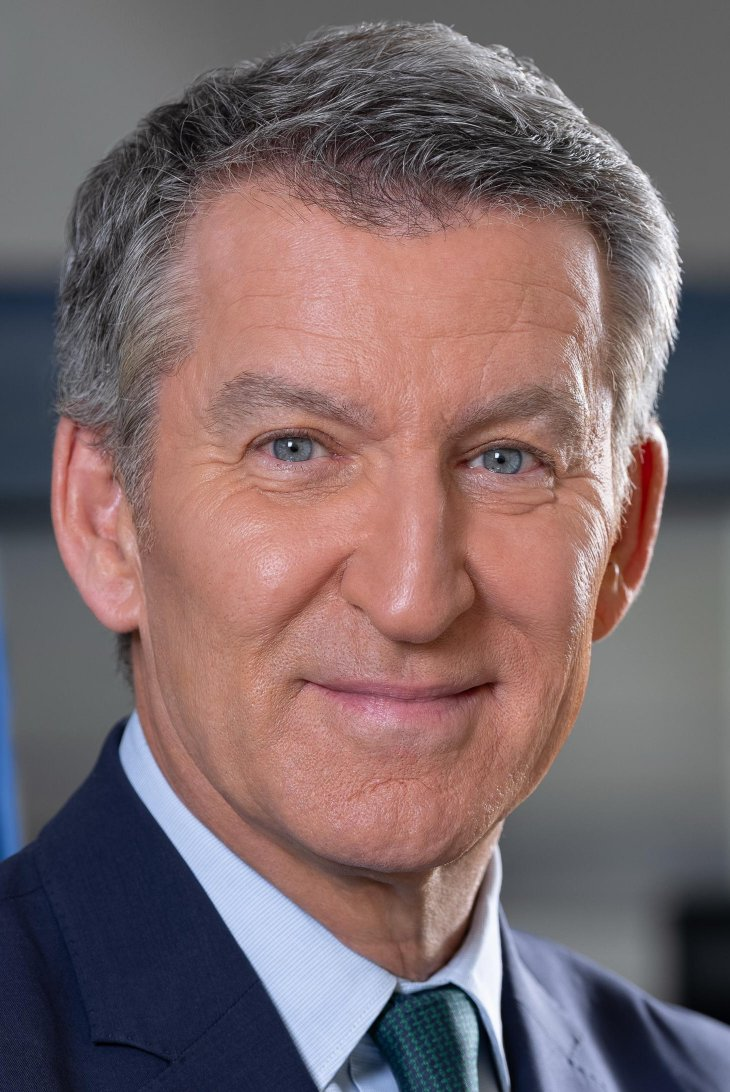

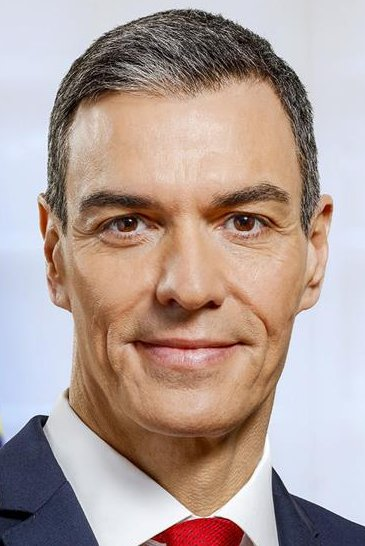

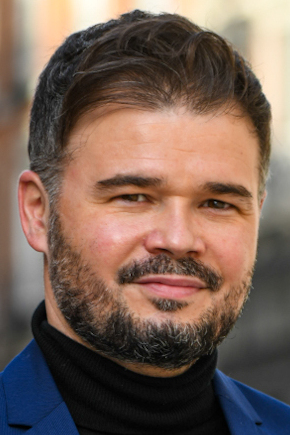

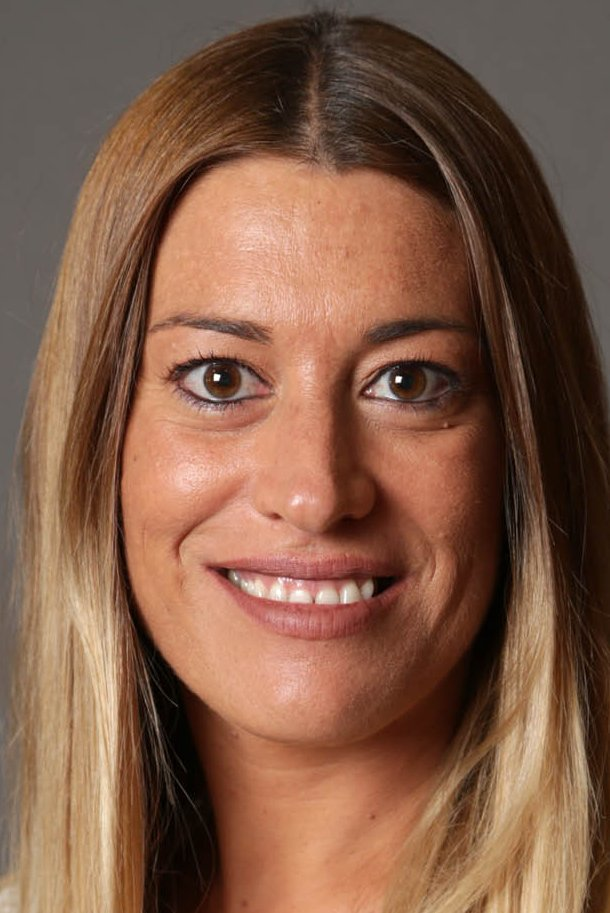
Leader	Alberto Núñez Feijóo	Pedro Sánchez	Santiago Abascal
Party	PP	PSOE	Vox
Leader since	2 April 2022	18 June 2017	20 September 2014
Leader's seat	Madrid	Madrid	Madrid
Last election	138 seats, 33.3% (Note: Results for PP (33.1%, 137 deputies) and UPN (0.2%, 1 deputy) in the 2023 Congress election.)	121 seats, 31.7%	33 seats, 12.4%
Current seats	138	121	32
Seats needed	▲38	▲55	▲143
Leader	Ada Colau	Gabriel Rufián	Míriam Nogueras
Party	FA	ERC	Junts
Leader since	12 October 2026	14 October 2019	12 March 2021
Leader's seat	Barcelona	Barcelona	Barcelona
Last election	24 seats (Sumar) (Note: Within the Sumar alliance in the 2023 Congress election: SMR (10 deputies), IU (5 deputies), CatComú (5 deputies), Podemos (5 deputies), MM/MP (2 deputies), Compromís (2 deputies), CHA (1 deputy) and Més (1 deputy). Includes results for NC–BC (0.2%, 0 deputies) and Recortes Cero (0.1%, 0 deputies), which ran separately in the 2023 Congress election.)	7 seats, 1.9%	7 seats, 1.6%
Current seats	25	7	7
Seats needed	▲151	n/a (Note: Does not field candidates outside of Catalonia (48 seats) and therefore cannot obtain a majority in parliament.)	n/a
- Constituencies for the Congress of Deputies
Incumbent Prime Minister
Pedro Sánchez
PSOE

A general election will be held in Spain on 29 November 2026 to elect the members of the 16th Cortes Generales under the Spanish Constitution of 1978. All 350 seats in the Congress of Deputies will be up for election, as well as 209 of 267 seats in the Senate. (Note: A constitutional reform was enacted on 20 May 2026 to award Formentera an independent senator separate from Ibiza.)

Following the 2023 election, Pedro Sánchez was re-elected as prime minister of Spain and formed a third government—comprising the Spanish Socialist Workers' Party (PSOE) and Sumar—with the support of most of the parliamentary regionalist and peripheral nationalist parties, and Together for Catalonia (Junts), the latter in exchange for a controversial amnesty law. Tensions with the opposition People's Party (PP) and far-right Vox dominated Sánchez's third term, as well as an unraveling international situation (with the ongoing war in Ukraine, the Gaza genocide, (Note: The characterization of Israel's actions in Gaza as genocide became a point of political contention in Spain from 2024 onwards. Prime Minister Pedro Sánchez adopted the term in September 2025, while the opposition PP generally preferred terms such as "massacre". In October 2025, PP and Vox senators voted against a PSOE motion describing the events as genocide; both parties also opposed the government's arms embargo on Israel in the Congress.) the tariff policy of the second Trump administration, and the 2026 Iran war and its economic impact), economic growth amid a rising cost of living, and a number of corruption probes affecting the government (mainly, the Koldo and Zapatero affairs). Also notable were the alleged mismanagements of a number of environmental disasters by PP-controlled administrations (particularly climate crisis-aggravated environmental disasters such as the 2024 Valencian floods and the 2025 and 2026 wildfires), sexual misconduct allegations affecting various parties and institutions, growing public outrage over the management of public services (particularly following the 2025 Iberian Peninsula blackout, and the 2026 Adamuz and Gelida train accidents), and immigration (with critical points in Torre-Pacheco and Ceuta). While Sánchez admitted to having twice hesitated whether to resign—in April 2024 amid a controversial judicial probe into his wife; then in July 2025 after the resignation of Santos Cerdán as PSOE's organization secretary over the Koldo affair—he voiced his intention to run for a new term as prime minister.

Amid major housing protests in the autumn of 2026 and the parliamentary defeat of his relief plans by PP, Vox and Junts, Sánchez dissolved parliament and called the election for 29 November. The member parties of Sumar (except for Podemos, which had split off in December 2023) launched a new alliance, the Broad Front, with former Barcelona mayor Ada Colau replacing Yolanda Díaz as leading candidate. For the first time since 1977, a major left-wing alliance including the PSOE (Senate of Progress) was formed for the upper chamber, prompting PP and Vox to assess potential forms of electoral cooperation. Together with Vox, PP leader Alberto Núñez Feijóo pledged to carry out sweeping right-wing reforms, including on social issues and constitutional reform. The 2026 Urda train collision on 28 October led most parties but Vox to temporarily suspend their campaigns and prompted the resignation of Óscar Puente as transport minister. The campaign resumed with the PP emphasizing the need for change after eight years of PSOE government and Sánchez projecting a message of hope and joy. Abascal's last-minute withdrawal from an interview with podcaster Jordi Wild was perceived as a major blunder to Vox's campaign, weakening its support among young people.

== Background ==
The 2023 general election saw Prime Minister Pedro Sánchez and his ruling coalition—formed by the Spanish Socialist Workers' Party (PSOE) and Sumar—re-elected with the support of Together for Catalonia (Junts), in exchange for a controversial amnesty law for those tried and convicted for events linked to the 2017–2018 Catalan crisis and the 2019 protests. This deal sparked widespread protests, some of them violent in the days before Sánchez's investiture, seeing clashes near the PSOE's national headquarters in Madrid and the involvement of far-right groups.

Sánchez's third term was marked by a booming economy and falling unemployment, but also by rising living costs and an affordable housing crisis. During this period, a constitutional reform in 2024 introduced people-first language, and a bipartisan agreement ended the five-year blockade of the judiciary council. Political tensions with the People's Party (PP) and far-right Vox intensified, with the government accusing both of "lawfare", disinformation and harassment campaigns. These tensions peaked in April 2024, when Sánchez briefly considered resigning after a controversial judicial investigation into his wife, Begoña Gómez, over alleged influence peddling and embezzlement accusations brought by the far-right-linked group Manos Limpias (Spanish for "Clean Hands"). The government also dealt with the 2025 Iberian Peninsula blackout, repeated failures in Spain's rail network (especially following the 2026 Adamuz and Gelida train accidents), and the MV Hondius hantavirus outbreak.

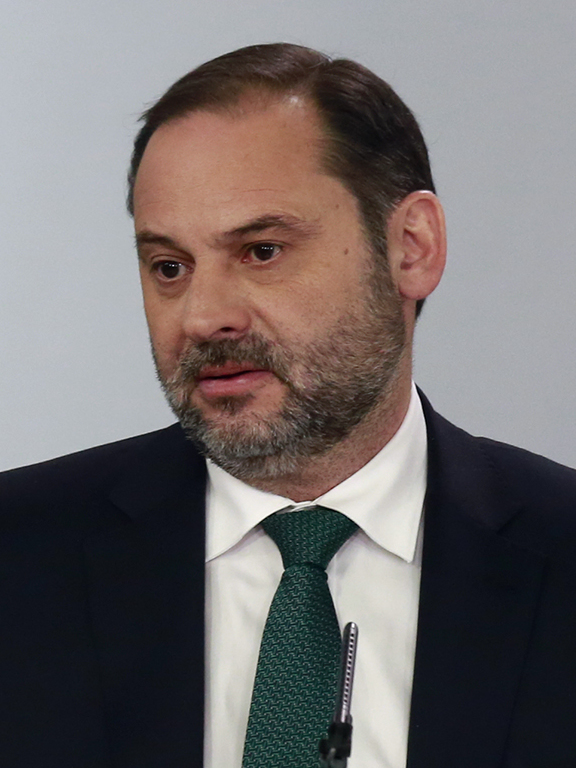
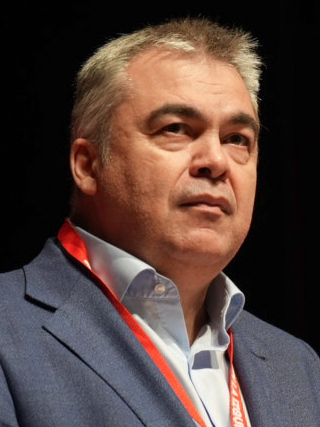
The Koldo affair, involving former Transport minister José Luis Ábalos (left) and PSOE's organization secretary Santos Cerdán (right), became the focus of a corruption probe from 2024 onwards.

On the international stage, Sánchez's government dealt with continued EU support for Ukraine in its war against Russia, the tariff policy of the second Trump administration, and the country's role within NATO amid a debate over the five-percent defense spending hike. Its strong criticism of the Gaza genocide led Spain to recognize Palestine and worsened relations with Israel, sparking pro-Palestinian protests and calls to boycott Israeli participation in international competitions, such as the 2025 Vuelta a España, and Spain's RTVE joining others' bid to withdraw from the Eurovision Song Contest 2026. The 2026 Iran war saw Sánchez and U.S. President Donald Trump clash over the use of joint military bases at Rota and Morón, reviving the "No to war" slogan previously used during the 2003 invasion of Iraq. At the same time, the Spanish government sought to address the war's economic impact by approving a €5-billion relief package.

Several political scandals affected the PSOE government during this period, including the Koldo affair (a kickback-for-contract scheme linked to José Luis Ábalos—a former transport minister—and party official Santos Cerdán), the Zapatero affair (involving the lobbying activity of the former prime minister), and judicial probes into Sánchez's brother (for alleged cronyism) and the Spanish Attorney General, Álvaro García Ortiz (for an alleged data leak). Other probes into alleged irregularities in public procurement affected the SEPI holding company and ADIF (Spain's railway infrastructure manager), leading to arrests and police raids. The PP was also hit by scandals, including several affecting the Madrilenian president, Isabel Díaz Ayuso (an investigation into her partner for alleged tax fraud, forgery and organized crime; the controversial purchase of a luxury penthouse using public funds, and unjustified travel expenses); renewed attention on corruption cases during Rajoy's premiership such as the Montoro and Kitchen affairs (alleged cash-for-favours, influence peddling and deep state networks); as well as a resume padding controversy. Sexual misconduct allegations between 2024 and 2026 shook various parties and institutions and led to multiple resignations and dismissals, with the political backlash often compared to the MeToo movement.

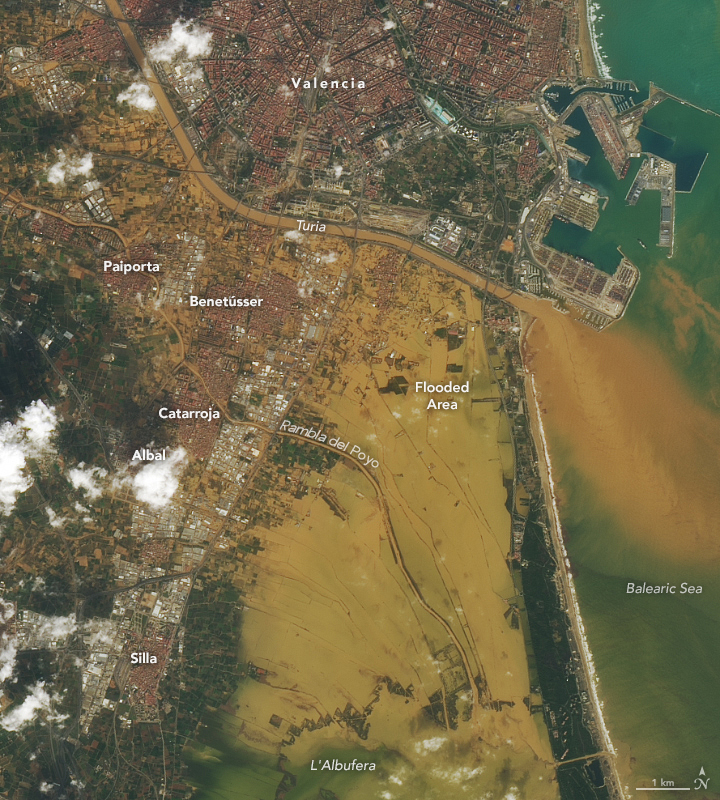
The botched handling of the deadly 2024 floods led to the resignation of Valencian president Carlos Mazón in November 2025.

Relations between the PP and Vox remained ambivalent, as the two parties competed electorally while still depending on each other to govern. The alleged mismanagement by PP-controlled administrations—including climate crisis-aggravated environmental disasters, such as the 2024 Valencian floods (seeing Carlos Mazón's resignation as regional president) and major wildfires in August 2025 and July 2026; as well as public outrage over an Andalusian Health Service's mishandling of breast cancer screening—was seen as contributing to Vox’s rise in opinion polls, helped by growing anti-political sentiment, denialism, conspiracist ideation and fake news. These issues and immigration (with high points in the 2024 unaccompanied migrant minors' distribution dispute, the 2025 Torre-Pacheco unrest, and the government's 2026 immigration amnesty) further pushed the PP closer to Vox's agenda, with PP's Alberto Núñez Feijóo embracing Santiago Abascal's nativist "national priority" in exchange of support for regional pacts. Concurrently, Vox purged several high-profile figures as it tried to broaden its appeal among working-class voters.

Changes in the political landscape of Catalonia—with Salvador Illa's Socialists' Party taking over the regional government in 2024 and the rise of the far-right Catalan Alliance—saw Junts withdrawing its support from the Spanish government in October 2025, but it remained uncommitted to support a no-confidence motion to oust Sánchez that would require the agreement of both PP and Vox. Throughout late 2025 and early 2026, the PP tried to capitalize on discontent with Sánchez's government by calling early regional elections in Extremadura and Aragon (together with regularly-scheduled ones in Castile and León and Andalusia), but this strategy backfired as the regional PP branches ended up relying even more on Vox to remain in power, while seeing a rise for regionally-based left-wing parties (such as Chunta Aragonesista and Adelante Andalucía). The political space to the PSOE's left fragmented amid Podemos's split from Sumar in December 2023, and Yolanda Díaz's announcement in February 2026 to not run for re-election, with attempts to reorganize it into a broad front of left-wing parties ahead of the general election still ongoing.

The issues of immigration and housing came to a head in the last few months of the government's tenure, amid the 2026 Ceuta migrant crisis and widespread protests across Spain following the high-profile eviction of an 87-year-old by a real estate company in September 2026. Sánchez's attempt to pass a housing relief package through parliament failed due to Junts's opposition, prompting him to dissolve the chambers and call a snap election for 29 November.

== Overview ==
Under the 1978 Constitution, the Spanish Cortes Generales are conceived as an imperfect bicameral system. The Congress of Deputies holds greater legislative power than the Senate, having the ability to grant or withdraw confidence from a prime minister and to override Senate vetoes by an absolute majority. Nonetheless, the Senate retains a limited number of specific functions—such as ratifying international treaties, authorizing cooperation agreements between autonomous communities, enforcing direct rule, regulating interterritorial compensation funds, and taking part in constitutional amendments and in the appointment of members to the Constitutional Court and the General Council of the Judiciary—which are not subject to override by Congress.

=== Date ===
The term of each chamber of the Cortes Generales—the Congress and the Senate—expired four years from the date of their previous election, unless they were dissolved earlier. The election decree was required to be issued no later than 25 days before the scheduled expiration date of parliament and published on the following day in the Official State Gazette (BOE), with election day taking place 54 days after the decree's publication. The previous election was held on 23 July 2023, which meant that the chambers' terms would have expired on 23 July 2027. The election decree was required to be published in the BOE no later than 29 June 2027, setting the latest possible date for election day on 22 August 2027.

Prime Minister Pedro Sánchez announcing a snap election for 29 November 2026

The prime minister had the prerogative to propose the monarch to dissolve both chambers at any given time—either jointly or separately—and call a snap election, provided that no motion of no confidence was in process, no state of emergency was in force and that dissolution did not occur before one year after a previous one. Additionally, both chambers were to be dissolved and a new election called if an investiture process failed to elect a prime minister within a two-month period from the first ballot. Barring this exception, there was no constitutional requirement for simultaneous elections to the Congress and the Senate. Still, as of 2026, there has been no precedent of separate elections taking place under the 1978 Constitution.

Prime Minister Pedro Sánchez repeatedly voiced his will for the next general election to be held when due in 2027, particularly following corruption allegations in June 2025 that led to the resignation of his party's organization secretary, Santos Cerdán. However, his government's political strategy, uncertainty over the General State Budget, as well as Sánchez having previously promised to exhaust legislative terms before ultimately calling snap elections—in 2019 and 2023—led to speculation that an early election could not be ruled out. Uncertainty over Junts's support to Sánchez was commented as a possible trigger of a snap election, while the outbreak of war in Iran fueled comments of a "Super Sunday" in June 2026, together with the regularly scheduled Andalusian election. Following that regional election, speculation emerged that the election would be held concurrently with the local and regional elections in May 2027, but this was promptly rejected by Sánchez in June 2026, who then hinted at the possibility of a general election in February or March 2027. Amid the autumn 2026 housing protests and the parliamentary defeat of Sánchez's housing plans on 2 October, the government acknowledged that it was weighting whether to call a snap election for 29 November. By the night of 4 October, multiple media were reporting on Sánchez's intention to call a snap election the next day and recover his housing relief plans, with him confirming the election date of 29 November.

The Cortes Generales was officially dissolved on 6 October 2026 with the publication of the corresponding decree in the BOE, setting election day for 29 November and scheduling for both chambers to reconvene on 23 December.

=== Electoral system ===
Voting for each chamber of the Cortes Generales is based on universal suffrage, comprising all Spanish nationals over 18 years of age with full political rights, provided that they have not been deprived of the right to vote by a final sentence.

The Congress of Deputies has a minimum of 300 and a maximum of 400 seats, with electoral provisions fixing its size at 350. Of these, 348 are elected in 50 multi-member constituencies corresponding to the provinces of Spain—each of which is assigned an initial minimum of two seats and the remaining 248 distributed in proportion to population—using the D'Hondt method and closed-list proportional voting, with a three percent-threshold of valid votes (including blank ballots) in each constituency. The remaining two seats are allocated to Ceuta and Melilla as single-member districts elected by plurality voting. The use of this electoral method may result in a higher effective threshold depending on district magnitude and vote distribution.

As a result of the aforementioned allocation, each Congress multi-member constituency was entitled the following seats:

Seats	Constituencies
38	Madrid^{(+1)}
32	Barcelona
16	Valencia
12	Alicante, Seville
11	Málaga
10	Murcia
8	A Coruña, Balearic Islands, Biscay, Cádiz^{(−1)}, Las Palmas
7	Asturias, Granada, Pontevedra, Zaragoza, Santa Cruz de Tenerife
6	Almería, Córdoba, Gipuzkoa, Girona, Tarragona, Toledo
5	Badajoz, Cantabria, Castellón, Ciudad Real, Huelva, Jaén, Navarre, Valladolid
4	Álava, Albacete, Burgos, Cáceres, La Rioja, León, Lleida, Lugo, Ourense, Salamanca
3	Ávila, Cuenca, Guadalajara, Huesca, Palencia, Segovia, Teruel, Zamora
2	Soria

209 Senate seats are elected using open-list (Note: Parties can group candidates into lists, although each candidate is treated separately for the purpose of the voting procedure.) partial block voting: voters in constituencies electing four seats can choose up to three candidates; in those with two or three seats, up to two; and in single-member districts, one. Each of the 47 peninsular provinces is allocated four seats, while in insular provinces—such as the Balearic and Canary Islands—the districts are the islands themselves, with the larger ones (Mallorca, Gran Canaria and Tenerife) being allocated three seats each, and the smaller ones (Menorca, Ibiza, Formentera, Fuerteventura, La Gomera, El Hierro, Lanzarote and La Palma) one each. Ceuta and Melilla elect two seats each. Additionally, autonomous communities may appoint at least one senator each and are entitled to one additional seat per million inhabitants.

The law does not provide for by-elections to fill vacant seats; instead, any vacancies arising after the proclamation of candidates and during the legislative term are filled by the next candidates on the party lists or, when required, by designated substitutes.

=== Outgoing parliament ===
The tables below show the composition of the parliamentary groups in both chambers at the time of dissolution.

Parliamentary composition in October 2026
Congress of Deputies
Groups	Parties	Deputies	
Groups	Parties	Seats	Total
People's Parliamentary Group in the Congress	PP	137	137
Socialist Parliamentary Group	PSOE	102	121
Socialist Parliamentary Group	PSC	19	121
Vox Parliamentary Group	Vox	32	32
Unite Plurinational Parliamentary Group	MS	11	26
Unite Plurinational Parliamentary Group	Comuns	6	26
Unite Plurinational Parliamentary Group	IU	5	26
Unite Plurinational Parliamentary Group	MM	2	26
Unite Plurinational Parliamentary Group	IdPV (Note: Part of the Compromís alliance.)	1	26
Unite Plurinational Parliamentary Group	Més	1	26
Republican Parliamentary Group	ERC	7	7
Together for Catalonia Parliamentary Group	JxCat	7	7
EH Bildu Parliamentary Group	EH Bildu	6	6
Basque Parliamentary Group (EAJ/PNV)	EAJ/PNV	5	5
Mixed Parliamentary Group	Podemos	4	9
Mixed Parliamentary Group	Més–Compromís	1	9
Mixed Parliamentary Group	BNG	1	9
Mixed Parliamentary Group	CCa	1	9
Mixed Parliamentary Group	UPN	1	9
Mixed Parliamentary Group	INDEP	1 (Note: Javier Ortega Smith, former Vox legislator.)	9

Parliamentary composition in October 2026
Senate
Groups	Parties	Senators	
Groups	Parties	Seats	Total
People's Parliamentary Group in the Senate	PP	142	142
Socialist Parliamentary Group	PSOE	73	88
Socialist Parliamentary Group	PSC	15	88
Left for Independence (Republican Left–EH Bildu); Parliamentary Group	EH Bildu	5	9
Left for Independence (Republican Left–EH Bildu); Parliamentary Group	ERC	4	9
Plural Parliamentary Group in the Senate (JxCat–CCa–AHI–BNG)	JxCat	4	7
Plural Parliamentary Group in the Senate (JxCat–CCa–AHI–BNG)	CCa	1	7
Plural Parliamentary Group in the Senate (JxCat–CCa–AHI–BNG)	AHI	1	7
Plural Parliamentary Group in the Senate (JxCat–CCa–AHI–BNG)	BNG	1	7
Basque Parliamentary Group in the Senate (EAJ/PNV)	EAJ/PNV	5	6
Basque Parliamentary Group in the Senate (EAJ/PNV)	PSC	1 (Note: The PSOE/PSC "lent" senators to other parties to allow them to maintain parliamentary groups.)	6
Confederal Left Parliamentary Group (More Madrid, Ibiza and Formentera in the Senate, Commitment, Gomera Socialist Group and Yes to the Future)	MM	1	6
Confederal Left Parliamentary Group (More Madrid, Ibiza and Formentera in the Senate, Commitment, Gomera Socialist Group and Yes to the Future)	EiFS	1	6
Confederal Left Parliamentary Group (More Madrid, Ibiza and Formentera in the Senate, Commitment, Gomera Socialist Group and Yes to the Future)	Compromís	1	6
Confederal Left Parliamentary Group (More Madrid, Ibiza and Formentera in the Senate, Commitment, Gomera Socialist Group and Yes to the Future)	ASG	1	6
Confederal Left Parliamentary Group (More Madrid, Ibiza and Formentera in the Senate, Commitment, Gomera Socialist Group and Yes to the Future)	GBai	1	6
Confederal Left Parliamentary Group (More Madrid, Ibiza and Formentera in the Senate, Commitment, Gomera Socialist Group and Yes to the Future)	PSOE	1	6
Mixed Parliamentary Group	Vox	5	7
Mixed Parliamentary Group	UPN	1	7
Mixed Parliamentary Group	INDEP	1 (Note: José Ignacio Landaluce, former PP legislator.)	7

== Candidates ==
=== Nomination rules ===
Spanish citizens with the right to vote may run for election, provided that they have not been criminally imprisoned by a final sentence or convicted—whether final or not—of offenses that involve loss of eligibility or disqualification from public office (such as rebellion, terrorism or other crimes against the state). Additional causes of ineligibility apply to the following officials:

- Members of the Spanish royal family and their spouses;
- Holders of a number of senior public or institutional posts, including the heads and members of higher courts and state institutions; (Note: These comprise the Constitutional Court, the General Council of the Judiciary, the Supreme Court, the Council of State, the Court of Auditors and the Economic and Social Council.) the Ombudsman; the State's Attorney General; high-ranking officials of government departments, the Office of the Prime Minister and other state agencies; government delegates in the autonomous communities; the chair of RTVE; the director of the Electoral Register Office; the governor and deputy governor of the Bank of Spain; the heads of official credit institutions; and members of electoral commissions and of the Nuclear Safety Council;
- Heads of diplomatic missions abroad;
- Judges and public prosecutors in active service;
- Members of the Armed Forces and law enforcement bodies in active service.

Other ineligibility provisions also apply to a number of territorial officials in these categories within their areas of jurisdiction, as well as to employees of foreign states and members of regional governments.

Incompatibility rules include those of ineligibility, and also bar running in multiple constituencies or lists, holding office if the candidacy is later declared illegal (by a final ruling), and combining legislative roles (deputy, senator, and regional lawmaker) with each other or with:

- A number of senior public or institutional posts, including the presidency of the National Commission on Markets and Competition; and leadership positions in RTVE, government offices, public authorities (such as port authorities, hydrographic confederations, or highway concessionary companies), public entities and state-owned or publicly funded companies;
- Any other paid public or private position, except university teaching.

=== Parties and lists ===
The electoral law allows for parties and federations registered in the interior ministry, alliances and groupings of electors to present lists of candidates. Parties and federations intending to form an alliance are required to inform the relevant electoral commission within 10 days of the election call, whereas groupings of electors need to secure the signature of at least one percent of the electorate in the constituencies for which they seek election, disallowing electors from signing for more than one list. Concurrently, parties, federations or alliances that have not obtained a mandate in either chamber of the Cortes at the preceding election are required to secure the signature of at least 0.1 percent of electors in the aforementioned constituencies. Amendments in 2024 required a balanced composition of men and women in the electoral lists through the use of a zipper system.

A special, simplified process is provided for election re-runs, including a shortening of deadlines, electoral campaigning, the lifting of signature requirements if these had been already met for the immediately previous election and the possibility of maintaining lists and alliances without needing to go through pre-election procedures again.

Below is a list of the main parties and alliances which will contest the election:

Candidacy	Parties and alliances	Leading candidate	Ideology	Previous result				Gov.	Ref.
Candidacy	Parties and alliances	Leading candidate	Ideology	Congress		Senate		Gov.	Ref.
Candidacy	Parties and alliances	Leading candidate	Ideology	Vote %	Seats	Vote %	Seats	Gov.	Ref.
PP	List: People's Party (PP); Navarrese People's Union (UPN); Asturias Forum (Foro) (Note: Unofficially.)	Alberto Núñez Feijóo	Conservatism; Christian democracy	33.3%	138	34.8% (Note: Results for PP (34.5%, 120 senators) and UPN (0.3%, 1 senator) in the 2023 Senate election.)	121	No	
PSOE	List: Spanish Socialist Workers' Party (PSOE); Socialists' Party of Catalonia (PSC)	Pedro Sánchez	Social democracy	31.7%	121	5.5% (Note: Results in the 2023 Senate election in the Canary Islands and Catalonia. PSOE and FA will contest the 2026 Senate election within the SDP alliance.)	19	Yes	
Vox	List: Vox (Vox)	Santiago Abascal	Right-wing populism Ultranationalism; National conservatism	12.4%	33	10.6%	0	No	
FA	List: United Left (IU) – Communist Party of Spain (PCE) – The Dawn Marxist Organization (La Aurora (OM)) – Republican Left (IR) – Unitarian Candidacy of Workers (CUT); Unite Movement (MS); Catalonia in Common (Comuns) – Barcelona in Common (BComú) – Green Left (EV); More Madrid (MM); Aragonese Union (CHA); Asturian Left (IAS); Zero Cuts (Recortes Cero); Assembly (Batzarre); Andalusian People's Initiative (IdPA); Greens Equo–Green Party (VQ–PV); We Are Progressive Party (SPP); We Are Asturias (Somos Asturies); Canarian People's Unity (UPC) – New Canaries–Canarian Bloc (NC–BC) – Canarian United Left (IUC) – Unite Movement (MS) – We Can (Podemos) – Greens Equo–Green Party (VQ–PV); Now More–Broad Front (Ara Més–EU–MS) – Now More (Ara Més) – United Left of the Balearic Islands (EUIB) – Unite Movement (MS) – Progress in Green (PEV) – Zero Cuts (Recortes Cero) – We Can (Podemos)	Ada Colau	Progressivism; Green politics Democratic socialism	12.6%	31	2.2% (Note: Results for Sumar (2.0%, 0 senators), NC–BC (0.1%, 0 senators) and Recortes Cero (0.0%, 0 senators) in the 2023 Senate election in the Canary Islands and Catalonia. PSOE and FA will contest the 2026 Senate election within the SDP alliance.)	0	Yes	
Podemos	List: We Can (Podemos)	Irene Montero	Left-wing populism Democratic socialism	12.6%	31	2.2%	0	No	
Compromís– FV (Note: Valencian Front has explicitly stated its aim to form a regionally-aligned parliamentary group separate from the Broad Front, but several sources still treat them both as part of the same bloc/alliance for polling and campaign coverage purposes.)	List: Commitment Coalition (Compromís) – More–Commitment (Més) – Valencian People's Initiative (IdPV) – Greens Equo of the Valencian Country (VerdsEquo); We Can (Podemos/Podem); United Left of the Valencian Country (EUPV); Republican Left of the Valencian Country (ERPV); Zero Cuts (Recortes Cero)	Àgueda Micó	Valencianism; Progressivism; Green politics	12.6%	31	2.2%	0	No	
ERC	List: Republican Left of Catalonia (ERC); We Can (Podem) (Note: In Catalonia.)	Gabriel Rufián	Catalan independence Left-wing nationalism Social democracy	1.9%	7	Contested in alliance (Note: EH Bildu (4 senators) and ERC (3 senators) contested the 2023 Senate election within the IPLI alliance.)		No	
Junts	List: Together for Catalonia (JxCat); Democrats of Catalonia (DC); Left Movement (MES)	Míriam Nogueras	Catalan independence Populism	1.6%	7	1.8%	1	No	
EH Bildu	List: Basque Country Gather (EH Bildu) – Create (Sortu) – Basque Solidarity (EA) – Alternative (Alternatiba)	Oskar Matute	Basque independence Abertzale left Socialism	1.4%	6	Contested in alliance		No	
EAJ/PNV	List: Basque Nationalist Party (EAJ/PNV)	Maribel Vaquero	Basque nationalism Christian democracy	1.1%	5	1.3%	4	No	
BNG	List: Galician Nationalist Bloc (BNG) – Galician People's Union (UPG) – Galician Movement for Socialism (MGS) – Abrente–Galician Democratic Left (Abrente–EDG) – Galician Workers' Front (FOGA)	Néstor Rego	Galician nationalism Left-wing nationalism Socialism	0.6%	1	0.8%	0	No	
CCa–1º CAN	List: Canarian Coalition (CCa) (Note: Several parties signed a manifesto supporting CCa with a common roadmap but without participating in electoral lists: Roque Aguayro (RA); The Fortress of Santa Lucía (La Fortaleza); Valsequillo Neighborhoods Association (ASBA); Local Platform for Santa Brígida (PVSB); Commitment to Firgas (COMFIR); Together for Guía (JPG); Vega de San Mateo Union (UVSM); Commitment to Haría (CxH); Citizens for Canarian Change (CIUCA); Together for Pájara (JPP); Always Yaiza (Yaiza Siempre); Rural Nationalist Bloc (BNR); Tinajo Renewal Movement (MRT); Democratic Centre Coalition (CCD); Tejeda Electors' Group (AET); United for Gran Canaria (UxGC); Fórum Drago Ingenio (Fórum Drago); Independent Herrenian Group (AHI)); Municipalists Canaries First (1º CAN)	Cristina Valido	Regionalism; Canarian nationalism Centrism	0.5%	1	0.3%	0	No	
Adelante; Andalucía	List: Forward Andalusia (Adelante Andalucía)	None/Various (Note: Adelante Andalucía did not field a single visible leader; instead, prominence was given to the lead candidate in each of the constituencies where it ran.)	Andalusian nationalism Left-wing populism Anti-capitalism	0.0%	0	Did not contest		15	
SDP	List: Spanish Socialist Workers' Party (PSOE); United Left (IU) – Communist Party of Spain (PCE) – The Dawn Marxist Organization (La Aurora (OM)) – Republican Left (IR) – Unitarian Candidacy of Workers (CUT); Unite Movement (MS); More Madrid (MM); Commitment Coalition (Compromís) – Més–Compromís (Més) – Valencian People's Initiative (IdPV) – Greens Equo of the Valencian Country (VerdsEquo); Aragonese Union (CHA); Assembly (Batzarre); Now More (Ara Més) – More for Mallorca (Més) – More for Menorca (MxMe) – Now Ibiza (Ara Eivissa); People for Formentera (GxF); We Can (Podemos) (Note: In Menorca and Ibiza.)	TBD	Progressivism; Social democracy Green politics	Did not contest		35.8% (Note: Results for PSOE (26.7%, 53 senators), Sumar (9.1%, 0 senators) and EiFS (0.0%, 1 senator) in the 2023 Senate election, not including the Canary Islands and Catalonia.)	54	Yes	
ERC– EH Bildu	List: Republican Left of Catalonia (ERC); Basque Country Gather (EH Bildu)	Francesc-Marc Álvaro	Left-wing nationalism	Did not contest		4.2%	7	No	
ASG	List: Gomera Socialist Group (ASG)	Yaiza Castilla	Insularism; Social democracy	Did not contest		0.0%	1	No	
AHI	List: Independent Herrenian Group (AHI)	Javier Armas	Insularism; Canarian nationalism Centrism	Did not contest		0.0%	1	No	
SALF	List: The Party is Over (Se Acabó La Fiesta)	Alvise Pérez	Right-wing populism Anti-establishment	Did not contest				15	
Sa Unió	List: People's Party (PP) (Note: In Formentera.); Commitment to Formentera (CompromísFormentera)	Vicent Tur	Conservatism	Did not contest				No	

The 2024 European Parliament election in Spain saw the electoral breakthrough of social media personality Luis "Alvise" Pérez who, running on a right-wing populist platform with his Se Acabó La Fiesta party (Spanish for "The Party is Over", SALF), secured 4.6% of the share. Alvise announced in July 2024 that he was considering to run in the next general election, but his public standing was damaged by an internal party crisis—which saw the defection of SALF's two other MEPs, amid accusations of bullying and blackmail—and several legal cases against him, including allegations of illegal financing, data leakage and harassment, which were the subject of ongoing investigations by the Supreme Court. Alvise formally launched his general election run in October 2025, confirming it upon the election call the next year.

FA and regional-aligned alliances for the Congress of Deputies

The political space to the left of the PSOE—which had broken up in December 2023 following Podemos's split and was commented as a key element in securing any prospective re-election of Sánchez's government—reorganized into the Broad Front (FA) brand, with former Barcelona mayor Ada Colau becoming prime ministerial candidate following Yolanda Díaz's renounce in February 2026. Republican Left of Catalonia (ERC)'s spokesperson in Congress, Gabriel Rufián, had proposed a broad front of left-wing parties (either directly or through coordination) that also included peripheral nationalists such as ERC, EH Bildu and the Galician Nationalist Bloc (BNG); ultimately, his party reached an alliance with Podemos to run in Catalan provinces after he was re-confirmed as ERC candidate on 11 October 2026. FA and Podemos failed to reach a nationwide agreement, though regional agreements were signed. Chunta Aragonesista announced on 21 October that they would not run in the province of Teruel to avoid "voter dispersion", though this was opposed by the United Left branch in the province.

SDP and regional-based alliances for the Senate

PSOE and Sumar probed prospective forms of cooperation to help take seats away from the PP and Vox, especially in smaller constituencies. A civil society initiative ("Senators for Democracy") pushed for negotiations between left-wing parties for a joint candidacy in the Senate, with talks in the Valencian Community also including Compromís. Concurrently, Més per Mallorca and Geroa Bai considered joint lists with the PSOE in the Senate constituencies of Mallorca and Navarre. Negotiations between PSOE and FA ultimately resulted in both allying in 49 Senate constituencies under the Senate of Progress umbrella (SDP). Further considerations were made on whether FA should run in smaller Congress constituencies, in order to optimize the vote among left-wing parties. The SDP alliance prompted both PP and Vox to also explore a potential coordination to prevent splitting their votes in the Senate, without ruling out the possibility of fielding joint candidacies, which Feijóo acknowledged. Vox allegedly requested the PP to ensure it had a parliamentary group of its own in the Senate, also requesting the PP to not field candidates in some provinces. On 26 October, both parties announced a Senate agreement under which Vox would not run in six provinces (the Balearic Islands, Cádiz, Castellón, Las Palmas, Santa Cruz de Tenerife and Valencia) and would field only one candidate in a further 14 (Álava, Alicante, Asturias, Badajoz, Cáceres, Cuenca, Granada, Huelva, Huesca, Jaén, Navarre, Pontevedra Seville and Zaragoza); in exchange, the PP would not run in Gipuzkoa, Girona and Tarragona, and would include independent candidates proposed by Vox—placed second or third—on its lists in the six provinces from which the latter would withdraw. FA responded to the PP–Vox alliance by withdrawing its Senate candidacies in Girona and Tarragona, as well as Lleida, in support of the Socialists' Party of Catalonia.

Catalan Alliance, Popular Unity Candidacy, Leonese People's Union, Jaén Merece Más and For Ávila all withdrew from running in the election, while the Regionalist Party of Cantabria discarded running again (having last participated in 2019).

== Election denialism ==
=== Mail-in voting ===
In the years going into the election, PP and Vox openly embraced election denial theories by questioning the integrity of the electoral process. One of the most common theories involved casting doubts on postal voting, stirring up the hoax that Sánchez's government was intent on rigging the election. Starting in June 2025, former prime minister José María Aznar claimed that Sánchez could try to tamper with the electoral procedure, with PP leader Alberto Núñez Feijóo immediately joining this accusation by claiming that the mail-in voting system had "loopholes".

After the election call in October 2026, the PP got tangled up in the statements made by its own leaders, as regional premiers such as Jorge Azcón and Isabel Díaz Ayuso initially questioned mail-in voting and urged people to vote in person, while others such as PP national spokesperson Borja Sémper claimed that the system was ensured through "a series of controls". On 7 October, Feijóo himself joined the conspiracy theories on mail-in voting and announced additional measures to be proposed to the Central Electoral Commission (JEC) to guarantee its integrity, claiming that he trusted "mail carriers" but not "the executives of Correos" (the state-owned postal service). On 16 October, the JEC replied to PP and Vox that, during elections, Correos already implemented secure and transparent measures for the custody of ballots in accordance with the law; that it could only take action in response to complaints regarding specific, individual cases—which had not been provided in the parties' complaints—and that any change to such procedure would require a legislative reform.

On 3 November, the newspaper El Confidencial published a report noting that in December 2025, at the behest of the Ministry of the Presidency—headed by Félix Bolaños—Sánchez's government approved an order granting itself access to exclusive information regarding the progress of mail-in voting during the election campaign, including real-time data on the level of voter mobilization in each territory. El Confidencial stated that, with these records, the PSOE can redesign its campaign strategy on a daily basis to focus its efforts on the areas where it has the greatest potential for improvement. Following this report, PP and Vox requested the JEC access to the daily information that Correos sends to the Interior Ministry regarding the progress of postal voting. On 17 November, the Correos works council in Madrid criticized the statements of PP and Vox members regarding their conduct during the election campaign, calling on both parties to act "responsibly", to "refrain from questioning the work of the staff", and to avoid "fostering distrust". However, on 21 November Correos admited to the JEC that it sends daily updates on the progress of postal voting exclusively to Interior Ministry, without sharing this information with the opposition and other parties.

Sánchez's government blasted the accusations by claiming that postal voting was "a right that has been exercised for years", depicting them as a right-wing misinformation campaign "out of fear of losing the election". The episode drew comparisons to the election denial movement in the United States. On 20 November, Correos reported that requests for postal votes had decreased by 58.1% compared to 2023; while some media outlets questioned whether it was proof of an alleged drop in confidence in this method of voting, various analyses attributed it to the marked increase in mail-in voting in the 2023 election—held in the middle of the summer season with people on vacation—with 2026 requests actually increasing by 11.5% when compared to the previous election held in the month of November.

=== Grandchildren Law ===
In June 2026, both PP and Vox accused Sánchez of trying to alter the electoral roll through the so-called "Grandchildren Law" (Spanish: ley de nietos), a 2022 legal provision within the Democratic Memory Law allowing the naturalization of descendants of Spanish Republican exiles, and which PP leader Alberto Núñez Feijóo previously campaigned in support of. The controversy focused on an instruction issued days after the law's approval, interpreting it by presuming all Spaniards who had left the country between 18 July 1936 and 31 December 1955 as exiles, without requiring specific evidence regarding the circumstances that led them to leave Spain. The Iustitia Europa and Vox parties appealed the instruction to the JEC and then to the Spanish Supreme Court, the latter of which decided in September 2026 to temporarily suspend the voting rights of non-resident citizens registered by virtue of its provisions—pending a final ruling—in order to "safeguard the transparency of the electoral process and the trust of citizens in its results" in light of the "magnitude" of the census increase since 2023 (from 2.3 to 2.7 million, as of 1 July 2026). The decision was contested by the Spanish government as "excessive", considering circumstances such as the very low turnout of non-resident citizens (which accounted for just 0.8% of voters in the 2023 election), and that seat changes resulting from this type of vote had actually benefitted the PP in recent times (granting them one additional seat in Biscay in November 2019, and another one in Madrid in 2023).

Upon the election call in October 2026, the Supreme Court set a 48-hour deadline for receiving arguments and appeals before ruling on the Grandchildren Law's suspension, in order to determine whether naturalized citizens would be able to vote on 29 November. Both the Solicitor General's Office and the Prosecution Ministry requested that the law's suspension be lifted for the 2026 election, citing the practical impossibility of reviewing all the files in time and the severity of the measure. On 9 October, the National Statistics Institute released data on registered voters for the election, totaling 38.7 million (an increase of 1.3 million since 2023, or 3.4%), of whom 2.8 million were non-resident citizens (an increase of 420,000, or 19%). The Supreme Court rejected the appeals on 12 October and confirmed the suspension for the 2026 election. The intention of several associations of descendants of Spaniards to challenge the suspension was disputed by Iustitia Europa, while the Spanish Ombudsman appealed the decision to the Constitutional Court, which was rejected on 21 October as untimely. The JEC decided to send voting documentation to the 2.7 million registered voters living abroad, with a warning to the 163,000 affected individuals under the Grandchildren Law that their case was still pending resolution. On 28 October, the Spanish government reported that only 901 of those who acquired citizenship under the law provided certification that their ancestors had been exiles. On 9 November, the Supreme Court upheld the right to vote for the children of those who acquired citizenship under the Grandchildren Law, owing to insufficient time before the election to review the electoral roll without compromising legal certainty and electoral stability. On 17 November, the Solicitor General's Office reduced the number of affected people to around 113,000 after excluding minors, individuals listed in the Spanish census, and duplicate records, but this was rejected by the Supreme Court, which maintained the suspension of the right to vote for all 163,000 affected people.

On 21 October, a Spanish court agreed to hear a criminal complaint filed by Hazte Oír against Sofía Puente—the author of the 2022 instruction and sister of Minister Óscar Puente—regarding an alleged offense of administrative prevarication in connection with the Grandchildren's Law. The next day, another court rejected a similar complaint filed by Vox on the grounds that it concerned a matter already dismissed in a 2024 decision upheld by the Provincial Court of Madrid in January 2025.

== Campaign ==
=== Timetable ===
The key dates are listed below. All times are CET, while the Canary Islands use WET (UTC+0) instead.

- 5 October: The election decree is issued with the countersign of the prime minister, after deliberation in the Council of Ministers, ratified by the King.
- 6 October: Formal dissolution of parliament and start of prohibition period on the inauguration of public works, services or projects.
- 9 October: Initial constitution of provincial and zone electoral commissions with judicial members.
- 12 October: Division of constituencies into polling sections and stations.
- 16 October: Deadline for parties and federations to report on their electoral alliances.
- 19 October: Deadline for electoral register consultation for the purpose of possible corrections.
- 26 October: Deadline for parties, federations, alliances, and groupings of electors to present electoral lists.
- 28 October: Publication of submitted electoral lists in the Official State Gazette (BOE).
- 2 November: Official proclamation of validly submitted electoral lists.
- 3 November: Publication of proclaimed electoral lists in the BOE.
- 4 November: Deadline for the selection of polling station members by sortition.
- 12 November: Deadline for the appointment of non-judicial members to provincial and zone electoral commissions.
- 13 November: Official start of electoral campaigning.
- 19 November: Deadline to apply for postal voting.
- 24 November: Start of legal ban on electoral opinion polling publication; deadline for non-resident citizens (electors residing abroad (CERA) and citizens temporarily absent from Spain) to vote by mail.
- 25 November: Deadline for postal and temporarily absent voting.
- 26 November: Deadline for CERA voting.
- 27 November: Last day of electoral campaigning.
- 28 November: Official election silence ("reflection day").
- 29 November: Election day (polling stations open at 9 am and close at 8 pm or once voters present in a queue at/outside the polling station at 8 pm have cast their vote); provisional vote counting.
- 4 December: Start of general vote counting, including CERA votes.
- 7 December: Deadline for the general vote counting.
- 16 December: Deadline for the proclamation of elected members.
- 24 December: Deadline for the reconvening of parliament (date determined by the election decree, which for the 2026 election was set for 23 December)
- 25 January: Deadline for the publication of definitive election results in the BOE.

=== Party slogans ===
Party or alliance	Original slogan	English translation	Ref.
PP: UPN–PP	Main: « El cambio necesario » UPN–PP: « Por España, por Navarra, por fin »	Main: "The necessary change" UPN–PP: "For Spain, for Navarre, at last"	
PSOE	« La fuerza de la gente » « Vota con fuerza »	"Power of the people" "Vote with power"	
Vox	« Es sentido común »	"It is common sense"	
FA: UPC; Ara Més–FA; CHA–FA	Main: « Un voto como una casa » UPC: « Una sola papeleta, todo un pueblo » Ara Més–FA: « Viure bé, viure aquí » CHA–FA: « Un Aragón donde poder vivir »	Main: "A massive vote/A vote like a house" (Note: Spanish como una casa ("like a house") is an expression that denotes something very large or massive. Here it has a double meaning, referring both to that expression and the issue of housing.); UPC: « A single ballot, an entire people » Ara Més–FA: "To live well, to live here" CHA–FA: "An Aragon where one can live"	
Podemos	« Paz, casa y trabajo »	"Peace, home, and work"	
Compromís–FV	« El vot que no et fallarà »	"The vote that won't let you down"	
ERC	« Defensa't »	"Defend yourself"	
Junts	« Catalunya al centre »	"Catalonia at the center"	
EH Bildu	« Posible Egin. Garantía y derechos »	"Make it possible. Surety and rights"	
EAJ/PNV	« Defendemos Euskadi » « Euskadi zaindu »	"We defend the Basque Country"	
BNG	« Galiza, dereitos, vida digna, agora con máis forza! »	"Galicia, rights, a dignified life, now with more strength!"	
CCa–1º CAN	« Defiende Canarias »	"Defend the Canary Islands"	

=== Debates ===
As in every election, several media groups offered to host debates between the prime ministerial candidates: Mediaset España (which offered a face-to-face debate between Feijóo and Sánchez), Atresmedia (a four-way debate including Vox and Sumar/FA on 18 November, and a face-to-face debate on 23 November), RTVE (a face-to-face debate on 17 November and a four-way debate on 26 November, as well as an eight-way debate with other minor parties on 23 November) and the newly-established La Séptima (a face-to-face debate).

On 9 October, Feijóo accepted the Mediaset face-to-face debate and the Atresmedia four-way debate (proposing to hold them on 16 and 26 November, respectively), but limited his participation in RTVE to in-house interviews, a decision allegedly directed at excluding interviewers such as Silvia Intxaurrondo (with whom Feijóo had a tense exchange in the 2023 campaign, commented as having been a decisive factor in the right-wing bloc's defeat). On 22 October, Sánchez accepted the face-to-face debate in a private channel on 16 November, but proposed that the four-way debate was the RTVE one on 26 November, which the PP rejected. Adding to the pressure, Atresmedia announced on 9 November that it had received the confirmation of PP, Vox and FA for the four-way debate and proposed to advance it to 23 November. Both PP and PSOE clashed over the debates' organizers because of their mutual vetoes, but ultimately agreed for the Academy of Television to organize both of them on 16 and 26 November, respectively.

Other debates were proposed for the leading candidates in various provinces, such as Barcelona (by RTVE and CCMA), or Zaragoza (by CARTV).

2026 Spanish general election national debates
Date	Organizer(s)	Moderator(s)	P Present (Note: Denotes a main invitee attending the event.) S Surrogate (Note: Denotes a main invitee not attending the event, sending a surrogate in their place.) NI Not invited I Invited A Absent invitee									
Date	Organizer(s)	Moderator(s)	PP	PSOE	Vox	FA	ERC	Junts	EH Bildu	PNV	Audience	Ref.
13 November	laSexta (laSexta Debate) (Note: Housing and economic debate.)	Ana Pastor	P Bravo	P Cuerpo	P Figaredo	P Bustinduy	NI	NI	NI	NI	11.9% (1,328,000)	
18 November	Cadena SER (Hoy por hoy) (Note: Housing debate.)	Aimar Bretos	P Bravo	P Rodríguez	NI	NI	NI	NI	NI	NI	—	
19 November	ATV	María Casado	P Feijóo	P Sánchez	NI	NI	NI	NI	NI	NI	70.8% (10,152,000)	
23 November	RTVE (Note: Parliamentary spokespersons' debate.)	Xabier Fortes	I Muñoz	I López	I Millán	I Delgado	I Rufián	I Nogueras	I Matute	I Vaquero		
26 November	ATV	TBC	I Feijóo	I Sánchez	I Abascal	I Colau	NI	NI	NI	NI		

Opinion polls

Candidate viewed as "performing best" or "most convincing" in each debate
Debate	Polling firm/Commissioner	Sample	PP	PSOE	Tie	None	Question
19 November	Ateneo del Dato/elDiario.es	1,146	45.2	31.9	6.2	13.7	3.0
19 November	Sigma Dos/El Mundo	?	50.5	29.0	4.0	16.5	–
19 November	40dB/Prisa	2,000	43.0	33.3	–	16.4	7.3
19 November	SocioMétrica/El Español	1,600	64.0	32.0	–	–	4.0
19 November	SW Demoscopia/La Séptima	?	49.7	19.5	3.3	7.3	20.1
19 November	Target Point/El Debate	?	39.2	13.8	9.2		37.8

== Opinion polls ==
Local regression trend line of poll results from 23 July 2023 to the present day, with each line corresponding to a political party.

Polling aggregations

Polling aggregator	Last update	PP	PSOE	Vox	Sumar	Podemos (Spanish political party)	SALF	FA	FV	Lead
El País	22 Nov 2026	31.3	28.5	18.4	(Note: Within FA.)	1.2	1.8	6.7		2.8
Nació Digital	22 Nov 2026	30.9; 129	28.9; 116	18.3; 61		1.2; 1	–	5.3; 8	–	2.0
Demócrata	22 Nov 2026	31.1; 131	28.2; 110	18.6; 67		1.3; 0	1.9; 0	6.1; 10		2.9
PolitPro	22 Nov 2026	29.8	27.5	18.1		1.4	1.8	6.0		2.3
The Economist	22 Nov 2026	31.0	28.0	19.0		1.0	–	6.0		3.0
Electomanía	22 Nov 2026	31.5; 130	28.4; 116	18.4; 61		1.1; 1	2.1; 0	5.3; 8	1.4; 3	3.1
BiDiMedia	21 Nov 2026	30.4	28.3	18.8		1.5	2.2	6.7		2.1
Electocracia	21 Nov 2026	30.6; 125	28.8; 117	18.5; 64		1.4; 0	1.8; 0	6.8; 11		1.8
El Debate	21 Nov 2026	30.6; 124	28.5; 115	18.7; 66		1.5; 0	? 0	6.5; 11		2.1
Europa Press	21 Nov 2026	31.2	28.4	18.6		1.3	1.9	6.8		2.8
Onda Cero	20 Nov 2026	31.0	27.6	18.8		1.6	1.9	6.9		3.4
ABC	20 Nov 2026	31.0	27.5	18.8		1.6	–	6.6		3.5
Politico	19 Nov 2026	31.0	29.0	18.0		1.0	2.0	4.0	–	2.0
RTVE	18 Nov 2026	31.0; 129	27.6; 112	18.7; 64		1.5; 1	2.1; 0	5.4; 8	1.2; 3	3.4
elDiario.es	17 Nov 2026	31.2; 128	27.3; 109	18.8; 65		1.7; 0	1.9; 0	7.0; 12		3.9
El Electoral	16 Nov 2026	31.0; 127	27.8; 113	19.1; 67		1.3; 0	1.7; 0	6.8; 10		3.2
El Periódico	16 Nov 2026	31.2; 130	27.2; 110	18.8; 65		1.6; 1	1.8; 0	7.0; 12		4.0
Ateneo del Dato	9 Nov 2026	31.2; 130	27.5; 112	18.6; 66		1.7; 0	–	6.5; 10		3.7
El Confidencial	1 Nov 2026	31.4	26.1	19.2		2.5	2.2	6.5		5.3
2023 election	23 Jul 2023	33.1; 137	31.7; 121	12.4; 33	12.3; 31	(Note: Within Sumar.)	–	–	–	1.4

== Voter turnout ==
The table below shows registered voter turnout during the election. Figures for election day do not include non-resident citizens, while final figures do.

Region	Time (Election day)									Final		
Region	14:00			18:00			20:00			Final		
Region	2023	2026	+/–	2023	2026	+/–	2023	2026	+/–	2023	2026	+/–
Andalusia	42.06%			53.19%			69.02%			66.61%		
Aragon	42.08%			52.56%			73.02%			70.71%		
Asturias	39.04%			54.11%			71.14%			62.90%		
Balearic Islands	37.27%			48.58%			63.56%			61.32%		
Basque Country	37.20%			52.43%			67.62%			65.09%		
Canary Islands	28.90%			45.40%			63.59%			58.18%		
Cantabria	43.00%			60.45%			75.37%			69.94%		
Castile and León	41.37%			54.85%			74.44%			69.41%		
Castilla–La Mancha	44.70%			56.28%			74.42%			72.99%		
Catalonia	36.79%			48.72%			65.43%			62.68%		
Extremadura	45.16%			55.81%			73.71%			71.67%		
Galicia	39.01%			55.97%			73.15%			61.41%		
La Rioja	45.76%			57.12%			74.86%			70.19%		
Madrid	40.83%			53.70%			74.15%			69.66%		
Murcia	44.24%			55.09%			70.79%			68.68%		
Navarre	41.28%			51.77%			69.86%			66.37%		
Valencian Community	46.24%			57.93%			73.64%			71.50%		
Ceuta	27.44%			39.30%			55.66%			53.19%		
Melilla	23.30%			31.94%			49.81%			45.24%		
Total	40.48%			53.13%			70.41%			66.59%		

== Results ==
=== Congress of Deputies ===
← Summary of the 29 November 2026 Congress of Deputies election results
Parties and alliances	Popular vote			Seats	
Parties and alliances	Votes	%	±pp	Total	+/−
People's Party (PP)^{1}					
Spanish Socialist Workers' Party (PSOE)					
Vox (Vox)					
Broad Front (FA)			n/a		
Broad Front (FA)^{2}			n/a		
Canarian People's Unity–UPC (NC–BC, Podemos, IU, Sumar)^{3}					
Now More–Broad Front (Aramés–EU–MS)^{4}					
We Can (Podemos)^{2}			n/a		
Commitment: Valencian Front (Compromís–EUPV–Podem–ERPV)^{5}					
Republican Left of Catalonia (ERC)					
Together for Catalonia (JxCat)					
Basque Country Gather (EH Bildu)					
Basque Nationalist Party (EAJ/PNV)					
Animalist Party with the Environment (PACMA)					
Galician Nationalist Bloc (BNG)					
Canarian Coalition–Municipalists Canaries First (CCa–1º CAN)					
Workers' Front (FO)					
For a Fairer World (M+J)					
Blank Seats to Leave Empty Seats (EB)					
Communist Party of the Workers of Spain (PCTE)					
Teruel Exists (TE)					
Yes to the Future (GBai)					
Soria Now! (SY)					
Forward Andalusia (Adelante Andalucía)					
Spanish Phalanx of the CNSO (FE de las JONS)					
Humanist Party (PH)					
Self-employed Party (Partido Autónomos)					
Regionalist Party of the Leonese Country (PREPAL)					
Federation of Independents of Aragon (FIA)					
Seniors in Action (3e)					
State of Spain Unionist Party (PUEDE)					
The Party is Over (SALF)			New		
Democracy for the 21st Century (D21)			New		
Justice Europe (IE)			New		
Drago Canaries Party (DRG)			New		
At the Same Time (Alhora)			New		
Feminists to the Congress (PFAC)			New		
European Retirees Social Democratic Party (PDSJE)			New		
New Extremennism–Forward Extremadura (NEx)			New		
Malagenian Alternative (29)			New		
Sunflower (Eguzkilore)			New		
Canarian Liberation (LIB)			New		
Convergents (CNV)			New		
United Valencia (VLC)			New		
Rebirth (RRB)			New		
Valencian Agenda (Agenda Valenciana)			New		
Nationalist Party of Castile and León–Citizen Reformist Union (PANCAL–URCI)			New		
Blank ballots					
Total				350	±0
Valid votes					
Invalid votes					
Votes cast / turnout					
Abstentions					
Registered voters	38,728,356				
Sources
Footnotes: ^{1} People's Party results are compared to the combined totals of People's Party and Navarrese People's Union in the 2023 election.; ^{2} Within the Unite alliance in the 2023 election.; ^{3} Canarian People's Unity results are compared to the combined totals of Unite, New Canaries–Canarian Bloc and Zero Cuts in the Canary Islands in the 2023 election.; ^{4} Now More–Broad Front results are compared to the combined totals of Unite More and Zero Cuts in the Balearic Islands in the 2023 election.; ^{5} Commitment: Valencian Front results are compared to the combined totals of We Unite to Win and Zero Cuts in the Valencian Community in the 2023 election.

=== Senate ===
← Summary of the 29 November 2026 Senate of Spain election results
Parties and alliances	Popular vote			Seats	
Parties and alliances	Votes	%	±pp	Total	+/−
Spanish Socialist Workers' Party–Broad Front (PSOE–FA)					
Senate of Progress (SDP)^{2}					
Socialists' Party of Catalonia (PSC–PSOE)^{3}					
Commons–Broad Front for Democracy (C–DEM)^{4}					
Spanish Socialist Workers' Party (PSOE)^{5}					
Canarian People's Unity (NC–BC, Podemos, IU, Sumar)^{6}					
People's Party (PP)^{1}					
Vox (Vox)					
Republican Left of Catalonia–Basque Country Gather (ERC–EH Bildu)					
Republican Left of Catalonia (ERC)					
Basque Country Gather (EH Bildu)					
Together for Catalonia (JxCat)					
Basque Nationalist Party (EAJ/PNV)					
Animalist Party with the Environment (PACMA)					
Galician Nationalist Bloc (BNG)					
Canarian Coalition–Municipalists Canaries First (CCa–1º CAN)					
Communist Party of the Workers of Spain (PCTE)					
For a Fairer World (M+J)					
Blank Seats to Leave Empty Seats (EB)					
Teruel Exists (TE)					
Yes to the Future (GBai)					
Forward Andalusia (Adelante Andalucía)					
Spanish Phalanx of the CNSO (FE de las JONS)					
Soria Now! (SY)					
Gomera Socialist Group (ASG)					
Regionalist Party of the Leonese Country (PREPAL)					
Federation of Independents of Aragon (FIA)					
Independent Herrenian Group (AHI)					
Seniors in Action (3e)					
State of Spain Unionist Party (PUEDE)					
Herrenian Assembly (AH)					
We Can (Podemos)			New		
Democracy for the 21st Century (D21)			New		
Justice Europe (IE)			New		
Drago Canaries Party (DRG)			New		
The Union of Formentera (PP–CompromísFormentera) (Sa Unió)			New		
European Retirees Social Democratic Party (PDSJE)			New		
New Extremennism–Forward Extremadura (NEx)			New		
Together for Extremadura (JUEx)			New		
Formentera Alive (Formentera Viva)			New		
Forward Proyect (PAlantre)			New		
Malagenian Alternative (29)			New		
Sunflower (Eguzkilore)			New		
Initiative for La Gomera (IxLG)			New		
Convergents (CNV)			New		
Valencian Agenda (Agenda Valenciana)			New		
Nationalist Party of Castile and León–Citizen Reformist Union (PANCAL–URCI)			New		
Blank ballots (Note: The percentage of blank ballots is calculated over the official number of valid votes cast, irrespective of the total number of votes shown as a result of adding up the individual results for each party.)					
Total				209	+1
Valid votes					
Invalid votes					
Votes cast / turnout					
Abstentions					
Registered voters	38,728,356				
Sources
Footnotes: ^{1} People's Party results are compared to the combined totals of People's Party and Navarrese People's Union in the 2023 election.; ^{2} Senate of Progress results are compared to the combined totals of Spanish Socialist Workers' Party, Unite and Ibiza and Formentera in the Senate in the 2023 election, not including results in the Canary Islands and Catalonia.; ^{3} Socialists' Party of Catalonia results are compared to the Spanish Socialist Workers' Party totals in Catalonia in the 2023 election.; ^{4} Commons–Broad Front for Democracy results are compared to the combined totals of Unite and Zero Cuts in Catalonia in the 2023 election.; ^{5} Spanish Socialist Workers' Party results are compared to the Spanish Socialist Workers' Party totals in the Canary Islands in the 2023 election.; ^{6} Canarian People's Unity results are compared to the combined totals of Unite, New Canaries–Canarian Bloc and Zero Cuts in the Canary Islands in the 2023 election.

== Bibliography ==
Legislation

- Constitución Española (Constitution). Official State Gazette (in Spanish). 27 December 1978 [version as of 20 May 2026]. BOE-A-1978-31229.
- Ley Orgánica 5/1985, de 19 de junio, del Régimen Electoral General (Organic Law 5/1985). Official State Gazette (in Spanish). 19 June 1985 [version as of 2 July 2026]. BOE-A-1985-11672.
- Real Decreto 806/2026, de 5 de octubre, de disolución del Congreso de los Diputados y del Senado y de convocatoria de elecciones (Royal Decree 806/2026). Official State Gazette (in Spanish). 5 October 2026. BOE-A-2026-20742.

Other

- Carreras de Odriozola, Albert; Tafunell Sambola, Xavier (2005) [1989]. Estadísticas históricas de España, siglos XIX-XX (PDF) (in Spanish). Vol. 1 (II ed.). Bilbao: Fundación BBVA. pp. 1072–1097. ISBN 84-96515-00-1. Archived from the original (PDF) on 24 September 2015.
