= Senate of Progress =

Senate of Progress Senado de Progreso
- Founded: 16 October 2026
- Ideology: Progressivism; Social democracy Green politics
- Political position: Centre-left to left-wing
- Colours
- Members: See composition
- Congress of Deputies: 0 / 350
- Spanish Senate: 0 / 266
- European Parliament (Spanish seats): 0 / 61

Senate of Progress (Spanish: Senado de Progreso) is an electoral alliance in Spain formed between the Spanish Socialist Workers Party (PSOE), United Left, Sumar, Commitment Coalition, Más Madrid, Chunta Aragonesista, Batzarre and Now More for the 2026 Spanish general election in the Senate of Spain. The alliance comprises 49 Senate constituencies distributed across 44 provinces, not including Catalonia and the Canary Islands.

The PSOE agreed to allocate 30% of the spots on the joint electoral lists to the parties of the Broad Front, although PSOE candidates would head the ticket in all shared constituencies.

== History ==
=== Precedents ===
The possibility of forming electoral alliances between the main left-wing parties in Spain for the Senate had been under discussion ever since the first such successful implementation in Ibiza–Formentera during the 1996 general election.

The 2000 election saw major attempts at exploring such joint candidacies involving the Spanish Socialist Workers' Party (PSOE). One such example was in Catalonia, where a left-wing alliance came to fruition between the Socialists' Party of Catalonia (PSC), Republican Left of Catalonia (ERC) and Initiative for Catalonia–Greens (IC–V) under the Catalan Agreement of Progress label, aiming to mirror the success of a similar alliance between the PSC and IC–V in the 1999 Catalan regional election. Ahead of the Senate election in Ibiza and Formentera, PSOE, United Left of the Balearic Islands (EUIB), The Greens (LV), Nationalist and Ecologist Agreement (ENE) and ERC formed the Pact for Ibiza and Formentera. Various attempts at forming a joint left-wing candidacy for the Senate in the Valencian Community were unsuccessful, primarily due to disagreement over the label and format of such an alliance. Nationwide, an agreement was reached between the national leaderships of PSOE and United Left (IU), under which both parties agreed to cooperate in 27 constituencies: the PSOE was to field two candidates to one from IU, with the parties urging voters to cast their votes as if it were a joint list of three. The PSOE also offered IU a similar agreement for the Congress of Deputies, wherein IU would not run in 34 constituencies where it was unlikely to win a seat on its own, with a later offer reducing the number to 14 constituencies. These offers were both rejected. This cooperation was electorally unsuccessful and later abandoned, though the Catalan alliance was maintained for subsequent general elections until 2011.

In 2008, the PSOE agreed to join alliances with other left-wing parties in Menorca and Ibiza–Formentera, though these were not renewed in the subsequent election. Ahead of the 2023 Spanish general election, such alliance was restored in the Ibiza–Formentera constituency.

=== 2026 election ===
Throughout 2026, a civil society initiative ("Senators for Democracy") proposed for PSOE, Sumar and Podemos to present joint lists for the Senate; upon the general election's call on 5 October, the promoters of the initiative engaged in formal negotiations with the parties, with talks in the Valencian Community also including Compromís. Concurrently, Més per Mallorca and Geroa Bai considered joint lists with the PSOE in the Senate constituencies of Mallorca and Navarre. By 9 October, the PSOE was formally studying the possibility of a joint list for the whole Senate, while pressing the Broad Front parties to not run in small and medium-sized Congress constituencies (those allocating fewer than six seats), in order to concentrate the entire left-wing vote. PSOE and the Broad Front parties ultimately signed an alliance for the Senate in 44 provinces, as well as Ceuta and Melilla.

In the Balearic Islands, the alliance will go under various names: "Agreement of Progress for Mallorca" (Catalan: Acord de Progrés per Mallorca) in Mallorca, "Menorca in the Senate" (Catalan: Menorca al Senat) in Menorca, "Ibiza in the Senate" (Catalan: Eivissa al Senat) in Ibiza, and "Formentera in the Senate" (Catalan: Formentera al Senat) in Formentera.

== Composition ==
SDP and regional-based alliances for the Senate

Party
| Spanish Socialist Workers' Party (PSOE) |
| United Left (IU) |
| Communist Party of Spain (PCE) |
| The Dawn Marxist Organization (La Aurora (OM)) |
| Republican Left (IR) |
| Unitarian Candidacy of Workers (CUT) |
| Unite Movement (MS) |
| Commitment Coalition (Compromís) |
| Més–Compromís (Més) |
| Valencian People's Initiative (IdPV) |
| Greens Equo of the Valencian Country (VerdsEquo) |
| Más Madrid (MM) |
| Aragonese Union (CHA) |
| Assembly (Batzarre) |
| Now More (Ara Més) |
| More for Mallorca (Més) |
| More for Menorca (MxMe) |
| Now Ibiza (Ara Eivissa) |
| People for Formentera (GxF) |
| We Can (Podem) (in Menorca and Ibiza) |
