= Més Compromís =

More Commitment Més Compromís
- Founded: 29 September 2019
- Dissolved: 30 May 2023
- Succeeded by: Sumem per Guanyar
- Headquarters: Valencia
- Ideology: Progressivism; Valencianism; Ecologism
- Political position: Left-wing
- National affiliation: Más País
- Members: See list of members

Més Compromís (Valencian pronunciation: [ˈmes kompɾoˈmis], English: "More Commitment"), was an electoral coalition formed by Coalició Compromís and Más País in September 2019 to contest that year's November general election in the Valencian Community. The agreement between Más País and Compromís implied respecting the latter's lists from the previous election, maintaining Compromís' electoral manifesto and granting autonomy to Joan Baldoví's group in the Congress of Deputies.

== Composition ==
Party
Commitment Coalition (Compromís)
Valencian Nationalist Bloc (Bloc)
Valencian People's Initiative (IdPV)
Greens Equo of the Valencian Country (VerdsEquo)
More Country (Más País)

== Electoral performance ==
=== Cortes Generales ===
Cortes Generales
Election	Valencian Community						
Election	Congress					Senate	
Election	Votes	%	#	Seats	+/–	Seats	+/–
2019 (Nov)	176,287	6.95%	6th	1 / 32	0 (Note: Compared to Commitment Coalition totals in the April 2019 general election.)	0 / 16	0
