= Àgueda Micó =

Spanish politician (born 1978)

Àgueda Micó i Micó (born 11 October 1978) is a Spanish politician. A member of Coalició Compromís, she was coordinator of Més–Compromís from 2016 to 2023, and was elected to the Congress of Deputies in 2023. In 2026, she established the Valencian Front.

== Early and personal life ==
Micó was born in L'Olleria in the Province of Valencia. She graduated in law from the University of Valencia and in politics and administration from the Open University of Catalonia. Micó grew up in a non-political family, but her two older brothers followed her into politics. She is married to Julià Engo, who was mayor of L'Olliera, and they had a daughter in 2009.

== Career ==
Micó was a member of her hometown's council from 2003 to 2015. She was included on Maria Josep Amigó's list for the executive of the Valencian Nationalist Bloc in 2003, which lost to Enric Morera by two votes; he included her in the executive the following year as a way to unite different sectors. She was the secretary of organisation of the Bloc from 2012 to 2016 and led their electoral campaigns in 2015, as well as negotiating the Acuerdo del Botánico that led to their inclusion in the second government of Ximo Puig.

In May 2016, the seventh congress of the Bloc elected a new form of leadership, the general secretariat, with Micó as coordinator and Rafael Carbonell the spokesperson. They received 87% of the vote. She was re-elected five years later by the succeeding coalition Més–Compromís, with 61.7% against the mayor of Bellreguard, Àlex Ruiz.

Micó was the lead candidate on the Compromís–Sumar list for the Valencia constituency of the Congress of Deputies in the 2023 Spanish general election. Three members of the list were elected by the 16-member constituency. On 23 June 2025, she left the Sumar parliamentary group and passed to the Mixed Group. This came after Sumar vetoed Compromís's list of individuals to testify before a commission on the 2024 Spanish floods, including prime minister Pedro Sánchez. Més–Compromís severed ties with Sumar, though the Valencian People's Initiative, which had no seats, did not.

For the 2026 Spanish general election, Micó established the Valencian Front, comprising Compromís, Podemos, the United Left of the Valencian Country, the Republican Left of the Valencian Country and Zero Cuts. Only in the Valencian Community and the Canary Islands did the parties to the left of the Spanish Socialist Workers' Party (PSOE) have one single list. She was named lead candidate in the Valencia constituency. In an interview with elDiario.es, she advocated for an end to property speculation, and labelled the PSOE hypocrites for calling for action on climate change while allegedly supporting expansion of the tourist industry.
