= 2026 Spanish housing protests =

Social movement for housing rights

- Part of Gen Z protests and 2026 European unrest
- Top to bottom, left to right: Demonstration in Barcelona; Protest camps in Madrid and Málaga; Protests in Plaza de Cibeles; Protester waving a red flag; Protest and camp in Puerta del Sol; 3 October demonstration in Madrid; Demonstration near the Congress of Deputies
- Date: 23 September 2026 – present (1 month, 3 weeks and 4 days)
- Location: Spain
- Caused by: Affordable housing crisis; Cost-of-living crisis; Property speculation; Landlord harassment; Gentrification and overtourism; Housing scandals affecting politicians (including Isabel Díaz Ayuso's penthouse controversy); Post-eviction suicide of Olga Matute; Eviction of 87-year-old "Maricarmen"
- Goals: Enforcement of the right to housing; Access to affordable housing; Protection of tenants against abusive practices and price hikes
- Methods: Political demonstrations, civil disobedience, civil resistance, sit-ins, online activism, protest camps, pot-banging protests, general strike
- Status: Ongoing: Maricarmen offered to return home; Spanish government approves two decree-laws including housing relief measures; PP, Vox and Junts vote down the government's plan in parliament; Snap general election called for 29 November 2026; Spanish government re-approves the two struck-down decrees, with enhanced protection measures for tenants; General strike called for 11 November; Maricarmen's death two weeks after her eviction sparks renewed protests

Casualties
- Injuries: 38 police officers (as of 13 October 2026) +25 protesters (as of 11 November 2026)
- Arrested: +83 (as of 11 November 2026)

A series of protests began in Spain following the high-profile eviction on 23 September 2026 of an 87-year-old, María del Carmen "Maricarmen" Abascal, which brought the country's ongoing affordable housing crisis back into the spotlight. Public discontent on the issue of housing had already been building up over a scandal involving the controversial purchase of a luxury penthouse by Madrid premier Isabel Díaz Ayuso and the suicide of an evicted woman in L'Hospitalet de Llobregat, Olga Matute, earlier in September. On 26 September, the protests turned into an organised protest camp at the Puerta del Sol square in Madrid, in an action widely compared to the 15-M Movement in 2011, forcing the Spanish government under Prime Minister Pedro Sánchez to agree to an emergency relief package including a temporary ban on evictions and stronger protection for tenants amid soaring rents.

Protesters have called for the enforcement of the right to housing, access to affordable housing and increased protection of tenants against landlord abuse and price hikes. While they have been very critical of the housing policies of Spanish administrations—both at the national, regional and local level, and regardless of political affiliation—the protests have met with understanding and sympathy from political parties on the left (such as the ruling Spanish Socialist Workers' Party and Sumar), and with open hostility from the right-wing People's Party and Vox. The latter parties, jointly with Together for Catalonia, blocked the parliamentary ratification of the two decree-laws containing the Spanish government's relief measures on 2 October, further fuelling the protests, which spread to cities across the country amid calls for a general strike in defence of housing rights and against property speculation. The parliamentary defeat of the decrees prompted Sánchez to call a snap general election for 29 November 2026, as well as to re-approve the decrees with enhanced protection measures for tenants and force their ratification through the Congress's interim Permanent Deputation.

On 7 October, Maricarmen died in the hospital to which she was taken upon eviction, with her death sparking more protests and renewed political infighting. The protests and their political impact have been described sometimes as part of the worldwide Gen Z protests.

== Background ==
=== Housing crisis in Spain ===
Housing costs and rental prices had been soaring for many years in Spain, particularly in major urban centers, as wages have not increased to the same extent. Housing construction in the country collapsed following the bursting of the Spanish property bubble in 2008 and the subsequent real estate crisis, but population kept growing in larger city areas (such as Madrid), causing a housing shortage in places where it was needed the most; the proliferation of short-term rents for tourism has been another factor, by significantly reducing long-term rental stock and driving up rent prices.

Recent analyses emphasised structural constraints on Spanish housing supply. In its 2025 annual report, the Bank of Spain described restrictions on housing supply growth as the principal factor behind the current housing access crisis, citing slow land development, low productivity and small firm size in residential construction, higher construction costs, and a shortage of skilled labor. Similarly, the OECD reported that only 345,000 permits for new dwellings were issued in Spain between 2022 and 2024, a period when there were 604,000 net new households. This report identified limited buildable land in high-demand areas, lengthy and uncertain permitting procedures, and poor coordination between different levels of government as key issues. The Bank of Spain warned in June 2026 that 750,000 new homes would be needed to close the gap between newly formed households and the available housing stock.

Housing policy has been a heavily disputed battleground between the Spanish government and regional administrations, which hold primary constitutional powers over urban planning and public housing. The central government adopted a Housing Law in 2023 that allowed regions to declare "stressed residential market zones" (Spanish: zonas tensionadas) to enforce state-backed rent caps, but it failed to ease pressure on the country's housing crisis as most regions ruled by the People's Party (PP) fundamentally resisted or blocked these measures, arguing that price controls hurt the market supply.

According to opinion polls, the issue of housing has emerged as one of Spain's major problems since 2025, with those surveyed also frequently showing support for increased government intervention to lower rents. Large demonstrations in support of housing rights and against property speculation took place in October 2024 in Madrid and Valencia, and in April 2025 and May 2026 in multiple cities across Spain. Concurrent anti-tourism protests in 2024 and 2025 took place against the overcrowding of city centers and housing shortages that displace locals.

=== Scandals and incidents ===
A scandal broke out in early 2026 after it transpired that public housing in Alicante—a PP-ruled municipality—had been allocated to high-ranking party and city council officials (including the local official responsible for urban planning), their relatives, and friends. A judicial probe was opened to investigate possible crimes of malfeasance in office, insider trading, conflict of interest and political corruption.

Throughout the summer of 2026, it was revealed that the Madrid regional government had purchased a luxury penthouse valued at €6.3 million earlier that year; while the official purpose of the purchase remained unclear amid changing versions, it was suggested for use as a personal residence for regional premier Isabel Díaz Ayuso. The scandal inflamed public outrage amid the ongoing housing crisis, while legal proceedings were initiated regarding a possible misappropriation of public funds. During The District real estate fair in Madrid on 22 September 2026, three housing activists stormed the venue to protest against the policies of Ayuso, José Luis Martínez-Almeida (Madrid's mayor) and speculation, scattering leaflets and setting off stink bombs.

A 54-year-old woman from L'Hospitalet de Llobregat, Olga Matute, died by suicide in early September 2026 after being evicted from her home. Her eviction procedure had resumed after the Congress —with the votes of PP, Vox and Together for Catalonia (Junts)—struck down a decree-law in February 2026 extending a suspension of evictions approved by Sánchez's government in the context of the COVID-19 pandemic in 2020.

== Developments ==
=== Maricarmen's eviction and initial protests ===
The eviction of Maricarmen Abascal (pictured in June 2026) became a symbol of Spain's housing crisis.

On 23 September, María del Carmen "Maricarmen" Abascal, a disabled 87-year-old woman, was forcefully evicted from her home in Madrid after a long judicial struggle with a real estate company, Urbagestión. The case gained notoriety due to Maricarmen's vulnerable condition and Urbagestión's refusal to suspend the eviction despite pending court filings, humanitarian appeals, a volunteer's offer to cover her rent payments and attempts by public authorities to secure an alternative accommodation for her; as well as for the violent police response—which saw the use of tear gas—against protesters attempting to block the eviction, among whom were actor Carlos Bardem and the singer and actress Ana Belén.

Maricarmen's case served as a catalyst for public discontent at the ongoing housing crisis in Spain, as well as a symbol for the pro-housing movement internationally. Following the eviction, a 10,000-strong spontaneous protest started in front of the Madrilenian government's luxury penthouse, with attendees calling for "Ayuso's penthouse for Maricarmen". The Madrid Tenants' Union (Spanish: Sindicato de Inquilinas de Madrid), which had organised eviction resistance in support of Maricarmen, called for a demonstration on 26 September which saw the participation of between 25,000 (according to authorities) and 300,000 people (according to organisers). This demonstration resulted in protesters spontaneously camping in the middle of the Puerta del Sol square, mirroring the 15-M Movement in 2011, to demand the Spanish government under Pedro Sánchez ban evictions and push for stronger protection for tenants amid the housing shortage and soaring rents. Protests subsequently spread to other major Spanish cities, such as Valencia, Barcelona, Seville, Zaragoza, Málaga, Murcia, Vigo, A Coruña, Palma de Mallorca, Oviedo, Cádiz, Santiago de Compostela or Guadalajara.

On 29 September, the City Council of Madrid under Almeida demanded the immediate end of the Puerta del Sol camp, while the regional government in Madrid sent a formal request to the Spanish government to dismantle the camp within 48 hours or face legal action. These calls by PP-controlled administrations in Madrid came as Sánchez's government—formed by the Spanish Socialist Workers' Party (PSOE) and Sumar—openly rejected forcefully clearing the encampment, and was joined by protests from campers that the clock chimes at the Royal House of the Post Office (Ayuso's headquarters as president of the Community of Madrid) rang every 15 minutes throughout the night and into the early morning, continuously interrupting their sleep. That same day, far-right groups such as Desokupa threatened on social media to storm Sol and evict the activists. By 30 September, the number of tents in Puerta del Sol had risen to over 1,200, with new encampments in support of the Madrid one spreading to major squares in cities such as Barcelona (Plaça de Catalunya) and Málaga (Plaza de la Constitución).

=== Government response and reactions ===
Demonstration in Plaza de Cibeles (Madrid) on 26 September 2026, in response to Maricarmen's eviction

Mounting public pressure forced Urbagestión—the investment fund that had triggered Maricarmen's eviction—to backtrack and allow her to move back into the apartment, while prompting Sánchez's government to agree to emergency relief measures on housing. These measures, distributed in two decree-laws, included:

- A ban on evictions of vulnerable tenants until 2030;
- Bans on "vulture funds" buying property until 2028;
- Regulation of temporary leases and room rentals;
- A two-year extension on rental agreements due to expire before the end of 2028;
- A VAT rate increase to 10% for tourist apartments, as well as a hike in the property tax (IBI) for such dwellings;
- Zero-interest loans of up to €50,000 for the purchase of a first home ("Tu Casa" scheme);
- Tax breaks for landlords and tenants to encourage a drop in rental prices;
- A VAT rate reduction to 4% for housing construction;
- Automatic renewal of rental agreements (with compensation of at least 12 months' rent if a landlord terminates a contract without just cause).

Puerta del Sol encampment on 30 September, with protesters waving a red flag atop the Statue of the Bear and the Strawberry Tree

While tenant unions criticised the government's move to split the measures into two bills and regarded them as not ambitious enough, they also viewed them as a starting point and demanded their passage in parliament, calling for pressure actions on still-doubting parties. The Catalan government under Salvador Illa praised the central government's measures and announced an additional €125 million shared-ownership plan for families unable to secure a mortgage.

Sánchez's plans were dismissed by the right-wing opposition PP and Vox parties, with its approval relying on Junts's position. PP leader Alberto Núñez Feijóo announced his party's outright opposition to the decrees even before the specific measures were unveiled, while Vox blamed the housing crisis on immigration and called for mass deportations. Republican Left of Catalonia, EH Bildu, Podemos, Més–Compromís and the Galician Nationalist Bloc all announced their support to the two bills, while the Basque Nationalist Party and Canarian Coalition announced their support for the first and their opposition to the second.

Tenant unions called for new protest actions across the country in support of the decrees' approval, including pot-banging protests on 1 October in front of town halls and further demonstrations on 3 and 4 October, while urging for a general strike against the housing crisis. An online initiative calling for the Congress of Deputies to ratify the measures adopted by the government (in a vote scheduled for 2 October) overwhelmed legislators' inboxes with over 300,000 e-mails within 24 hours. In the night previous to the vote, Junts regarded the decrees as having "negative and irreversible effects on housing" and called for their withdrawal or else it would oppose them, all but ensuring they would be brought down by parliament. Sánchez's government replied by announcing it would not withdraw the housing bills and dared Junts, together with PP and Vox, to "show their true colours". Public outcry at a possible parliamentary defeat of the bills was speculated by media as a potential trigger for Sánchez to advance the next general election—scheduled for no later than August 2027, and with a tentative date of February or March 2027—to 29 November 2026.

=== Vote on the government's plan ===
The tenant unions announced protests in front of the Congress ahead of the 2 October vote, calls which intensified after Junts confirmed its opposition to the government's plans. Junts' decision was received with outrage by the government parties, as the first decree in particular included many concessions and proposals to appease them, while the unions accused Junts of "constantly boycotting" all talks. Negotiations continued in the last few hours before the vote, with Junts presenting a new housing package and the Spanish government unwilling to withdraw its own plans. Through his X account, Sánchez himself accused PP, Vox and Junts of siding with speculators and stated that "their vote will define them in the eyes of entire generations".

PSOE and Sumar requested a roll-call vote on the decrees to force Junts's legislators to publicly record their votes, while the government simultaneously hinted at a snap election in the event of a parliamentary defeat. The PP dubbed the decrees' ratification ballot as a "veiled vote of confidence" on the government. Protesters gathered in the vicinity of Congress in Madrid and in front of Junts's headquarters in Barcelona while the parliamentary debate was taking place. Sánchez made an unscheduled, last-ditch effort to convince parliamentary groups opposing his plan, warning that "history will judge them sooner than they think and with more force than they imagine".

Ratification of Decree-Law; Congress of Deputies; Royal Decree-Law 26/2026 (Note: Royal Decree-Law 26/2026 of 29 September, adopting urgent measures for the protection of the social function of housing and the expansion of the affordable housing supply; and Royal Decree-Law 27/2026 of 29 September, adopting urgent measures to strengthen the stability of primary residence lease agreements.)
Ballot →	2 October 2026
Required majority →	Simple
Yes: • PSOE (121); • Sumar (26); • ERC (7); • EH Bildu (6); • PNV (5); • Podemos (4); • Més–Compromís (1); • BNG (1); • CCa (1)	172 / 350
No: • PP (137); • Vox (32); • Junts (7); • UPN (1); • INDEP (1)	178 / 350
Abstentions	0 / 350
Absentees	0 / 350

Ratification of Decree-Law; Congress of Deputies; Royal Decree-Law 27/2026
Ballot →	2 October 2026
Required majority →	Simple
Yes: • PSOE (121); • Sumar (26); • ERC (7); • EH Bildu (6); • Podemos (4); • Més–Compromís (1); • BNG (1)	166 / 350
No: • PP (137); • Vox (32); • Junts (7); • PNV (5); • CCa (1); • UPN (1); • INDEP (1)	184 / 350
Abstentions	0 / 350
Absentees	0 / 350

The defeat of the two decrees was hailed as a victory by the PP and Vox, whose deputies visibly cheered at the result of the vote, as a group of activists threw leaflets from the visitors' gallery into the chamber while shouting that "vulture funds rule Congress". The Spanish government announced it would reflect on the situation during the weekend, without ruling out an early electoral call. PP leader Feijóo dared Sánchez to set a date for an early election, as tenant unions vowed to continue their mobilization and called for people to take to the streets across the country in new protests scheduled for between 2 and 5 October.

=== 2–5 October protests ===
Spain's two largest trade unions, Workers' Commissions (CCOO) and the General Union of Workers (UGT), urged citizens to participate in the countrywide protests in response to the decrees' defeat and considered whether to support a general strike. During the afternoon and into the night of 2 October, thousands protested in Seville, Bilbao, Vitoria-Gasteiz, San Sebastián, Pamplona and Oviedo in defence of the right to housing and against the political class.

Madrid demonstration on 3 October

Subsequent demonstrations were held on 3 October in more than 50 Spanish cities, stepping up demands for action against the ongoing housing crisis following the parliamentary repeal of the government's decrees. In Madrid, between 70,000 (according to authorities) and 500,000 people (according to organisers) marched in four columns that converged at Plaza de Cibeles. In Valencia—where the demonstration gathered between 6,000 and 50,000—dozens of young people set up a camp in Valencia's Plaza del Ayuntamiento. Other major demonstrations took place in Málaga (9,000–50,000), Granada (12,000), Zaragoza (over 10,000), A Coruña (10,000), Cádiz (3,500–10,000), Santa Cruz de Tenerife (2,000–10,000), Alicante (3,000–9,000), Las Palmas de Gran Canaria (3,500–8,000), or Vigo (5,000).

The demonstration in Barcelona had to be postponed to 5 October due to weather warnings and the potential risk of torrential rains caused by a Mediterranean mini-hurricane, ultimately gathering an estimated 20,000 to 120,000 people. Further demonstrations took place on 4 October in Oviedo (8,000–20,000), as well as other cities such as Bilbao, while the General Confederation of Labour openly called for a general strike.

As the protests unfolded and in anticipation on an early electoral call, Junts offered to negotiate its housing proposals with the Spanish government to reach an agreement, while the PSOE responded skeptically that the recently rejected decrees already included those very proposals. The success of the 3 October protests reportedly pushed the PSOE to try to capitalise on the momentum and advance the general election to 29 November, despite acknowledging the risk of protesters also denouncing the perceived failure of Sánchez's housing policies after eight years in power. New opinion polls conducted during the protests showed a overwhelming majority of voters—including those of PP, Vox and Junts—both supporting the housing measures recently struck down by the Congress and regarding them as not ambitious enough. On 4 October and amid growing snap election speculation, Sumar's ministers confirmed 17 October as the date for the launching of their Broad Front platform and candidate. That same night, several media reported that Sánchez was ready for a snap election announcement the next day, together with a full or partial recovery of the measures contained in the struck down decrees.

=== Election call and Maricarmen's death ===
Prime Minister Pedro Sánchez announcing a snap election for 29 November 2026

On 5 October, Sánchez confirmed that he was calling a snap election for 29 November 2026, seeking to frame it on housing as the central issue and asking for "a much larger progressive majority in parliament". His government subsequently passed two new decrees with emergency housing measures, which included and expanded on many of the ones struck down by parliament the previous week. Compared to the bills rejected by Congress, the new decrees included strengthened protections for vulnerable tenants against evictions, the bans on vulture funds' property purchases from 2028 to 2030, new mandatory lease extensions, enhanced transparency in rental listings and initial funding of 10 billion for the "Tu Casa" scheme. Sánchez intended for the decrees to be ratified in the Congress's interim legislative body after dissolution (the Permanent Deputation), where Junts's votes were not required for approval.

Demonstration organised by the Tenants' Union on 8 October 2026, the day after Maricarmen's death, marching from the Puerta del Sol encampment to her home in Madrid

Maricarmen, the woman whose eviction triggered the protests (and ultimately, the snap election call) died on 7 October in the hospital to which she was taken immediately after being evicted from her home, her health having deteriorated from severe exhaustion over the last few months and particularly during the two weeks following her eviction. In response, 10,000 people (including hundreds of campers from Sol) marched to the Congress's surroundings. Both the prime minister and the opposition leader—Sánchez and Feijóo—expressed their condolences; however, the latter's party (already facing criticism for having voted against the housing measures the previous week) came under simultaneous fire for blocking a minute of silence in memory of Maricarmen during the Assembly of Madrid and Madrid City Council's plenary sessions scheduled for the following day, as well as in the Senate's standing commission. The day after Maricarmen's death, 20,000 marched through the centre of Madrid in her memory. Maricarmen's death saw a renewed push by left-wing parties against real estate investment funds and the misinformation campaign she suffered, while PP and Vox accused the Spanish government of seeking to exploit the situation ahead of the general election.

The Madrid regional government announced on 16 October that it would be temporarily closing down the Sol metro station due to unsanitary conditions caused by the camp on the surface, claiming it put the safety of workers at risk; metro unions rejected this being the case, while the national government replied by maintaining the Cercanías Madrid commuter train service in the station. For weeks, Ayuso's government had attempted to clear the encampment in the square—even accusing the participants of harboring "radical groups associated with terrorist entities"—but the Government Delegation (controlled by the central executive) repeatedly refused, citing the protesters' freedom of assembly.

=== General strike ===
The CCOO and UGT trade unions agreed on 5 October to support a general strike over the housing crisis for later in the autumn, which was confirmed two days later for 11 November—two-and-a-half weeks before election day and two days before the official start of electoral campaigning—and supported by the tenants' unions, as well as the Galician Unions' Confederacy, Basque Workers' Solidarity and the Nationalist Workers' Committees trade unions. The general strike was opposed by the main representative organization of the Spanish business community (CEOE) and the primary national employers' organization representing small and medium-sized enterprises (CEPYME), as well as by PP, Vox and trade unions such as the Independent Trade Union of Civil Servants, the Federation of Independent Workers of Commerce and the Workers' Trade Union; among the reasons for their opposition were that the strike was not motivated by labour issues and constituted "unjustifiable pressure" on the election.

On 11 November 2026, workers across Spain walked off the job in a nationwide strike over the country's housing crisis, in the first general strike in 14 years, protesting rising rents and forced evictions. Millions of people mobilised throughout the country. The strike saw its largest turnout in Catalonia, where the CCOO reported 84% of workers had gone out on strike; the union also reported a 75% turnout among workers in Andalusia and Aragon. Demonstrations took place during the evening across many of Spain's largest cities, gathering between 120,000 (according to authorities) and 600,000 people (according to organisers) in Madrid, 55,000–400,000 in Barcelona, and thousands in Valencia . A total of 3 million people joined the protests nationwide (according to the organizers).

== Incidents ==
The Valencia demonstration on 3 October saw protesters attempting to storm a real estate investment conference at the Palau de les Arts, leading to police charges and resulting in nine police officers injured and five people detained. Riots also took place in Madrid during the afternoon and evening of 3 October, incited by far-right organizations (such as National Nucleus and National Democracy) attempting to assault the Puerta del Sol encampment, with three detained. In Oviedo, four individuals linked to far-right groups were arrested and accused of assaulting people who were camping in the Plaza de la Escandalera.

Clashes with the police in the 5 October Barcelona demonstration resulted in 13 people detained and 28 police officers injured.

On 12 October, the Sol camp was again stormed by a group of far-right sympathisers who had attended the National Day of Spain celebrations, amidst insults directed at Sánchez, fascist salutes and symbols, and Cara al Sol chants; this resulted in five people detained and one injured police officer.

The general strike of 11 November saw at least 53 detained and 1,044 incidents, including road blockages, attempts to block access to businesses, the burning of waste containers, damage to shops and street furniture, or resistance to authority. At least 25 people were injured in clashes between protesters and police in Madrid.

On 12 November, Spain's Interior Minister, Fernando Grande-Marlaska, directed that an inquiry be opened into how police had conducted themselves during the general strike held the previous day, and he prohibited the use of tear gas as a means of crowd control at demonstrations. According to the Interior Ministry, this inquiry is to proceed independently of the standard internal review carried out by the National Police. It remained unclear whether the ban on tear gas would extend to pepper spray as well.

== Other protests ==
The protests in Spain inspired a similar housing movement in Portugal, with demonstrations taking place on 10 October in Lisbon, Porto, Braga, Funchal and Aveiro, under the slogan "We can no longer live like this" (Portuguese: Não dá mais para viver assim). In Porto, a camp was set up that day in Praça D. João I. A week later, the movement spread to Rossio in Lisbon.

== See also ==
- Spanish property bubble
- 2008–2014 Spanish financial crisis
- 2008–2014 Spanish real estate crisis
- 2024–2025 Spanish anti-tourism protests
- 2026 Portuguese housing protests
