= Sumem per Guanyar =

We Unite to Win Sumem per Guanyar
- Founded: 9 June 2023
- Dissolved: 16 October 2026
- Preceded by: Més Compromís
- Succeeded by: Valencian Front
- Headquarters: Valencia
- Ideology: Progressivism; Valencianism; Ecologism
- Political position: Left-wing
- National affiliation: Sumar
- Members: See list of members

Sumem per Guanyar (English: "We Unite to Win", Compromís–Sumar) was an electoral coalition formed by Coalició Compromís and Sumar in June 2023 to contest that year's 23 July general election in the Valencian Community.

== Composition ==
Party
Commitment Coalition (Compromís)
Més–Compromís (Més)
Valencian People's Initiative (IdPV)
Greens Equo of the Valencian Country (VerdsEquo)
Unite (Sumar)
Unite Movement (SMR)
We Can (Podem)
United Left of the Valencian Country (EUPV)

== Electoral performance ==
=== Cortes Generales ===
Cortes Generales
Election	Valencian Community			
Election	Congress			
Election	Votes	%	Seats	+/–
2023	402,813	15.23 (#4)	4 / 33	1
