= Municipalists Canaries First =

Municipalists Canaries First Municipalistas Primero Canarias
- Abbreviation: 1º CAN
- Leader: Óscar Hernández Suárez
- Registered: 9 June 2025
- Split from: New Canaries
- Headquarters: Paseo Tomás Morales, 7. Las Palmas de Gran Canaria
- Ideology: Canarian nationalism
- Political position: Centre-left
- Colors
- Congress of Deputies: 0 / 350
- Spanish Senate: 0 / 266
- European Parliament (Spanish seats): 0 / 61

Website
- primerocanarias.com

Municipalists Canaries First (Spanish: Municipalistas Primero Canarias, 1º CAN), sometimes abbreviated as Canaries First (Spanish: Primero Canarias), is a political party in the Canary Islands, founded as a split of New Canaries. It will contest the 2026 Spanish general elections in electoral alliance with Canarian Coalition.
