= Valencian Front =

Valencian Front Front Valencià
- Founded: 16 October 2026
- Preceded by: Sumem per Guanyar
- Ideology: Valencianism; Progressivism; Green politics Republicanism
- Political position: Left-wing
- Members: See composition
- Congress of Deputies: 0 / 350
- Spanish Senate: 0 / 266

Election symbol

Website
- frontvalencia.org

The Valencian Front (Valencian: Front Valencià), officially Commitment–Valencian Front (Valencian: Compromís–Front Valencià), is an electoral alliance in the Valencian Community formed by Coalició Compromís, Podemos, Republican Left of the Valencian Country and Zero Cuts ahead of the 2026 Spanish general election. United Left of the Valencian Country (EUPV) was offered the chance to join the alliance, with EUPV initially rejecting the proposal on the grounds that, if the coalition reached the five-seat threshold, its deputies would be required to join the Compromís-led parliamentary group. Further negotiations ensued throughout the last day before the registration deadline for electoral alliances, which resulted in EUPV accepting the invitation.

The alliance is considered a part of the Spanish left's efforts to establish joint candidacies throughout the various regions ahead of the 2026 general election, and the only fully successful one in that regard. It aims to establish its own Valencian-aligned parliamentary group in the Congress of Deputies separate from other Broad Front parties, with its situation having been compared to És el moment and A la valenciana's similar attempts in 2015 and 2016.

== Composition ==
Party
Commitment Coalition (Compromís)
We Can (Podemos)
United Left of the Valencian Country (EUPV)
Republican Left of the Valencian Country (ERPV)
Zero Cuts (Recortes Cero)
