= Canarian People's Unity =

Canarian People's Unity Unidad del Pueblo Canario
- Founded: 15 October 2026
- Ideology: Canarian nationalism Progressivism; Green politics Federalism
- Political position: Left-wing
- National affiliation: Broad Front (confluence)
- Members: See composition

Canarian People's Unity (Spanish: Unidad del Pueblo Canario, UPC), is an electoral alliance in the Canary Islands formed by New Canaries (NC), Canarian United Left (IUC), Unite Movement (MS) and Podemos ahead of the 2026 Spanish general election. The name alludes to the historical Canarian People's Union alliance. Greens Equo–Green Party later unofficially joined the coalition. It also has the support of Zero Cuts, which is a part of the nationwide Broad Front alliance.

== Composition ==
Party
New Canaries–Canarian Bloc (NC–BC)
Canarian United Left (IUC)
Unite Movement (MS)
We Can (Podemos)
Greens Equo–Green Party (VQ–PV)
