= Míriam Nogueras =

Spanish businesswoman and politician (born 1980)

Míriam Nogueras MP
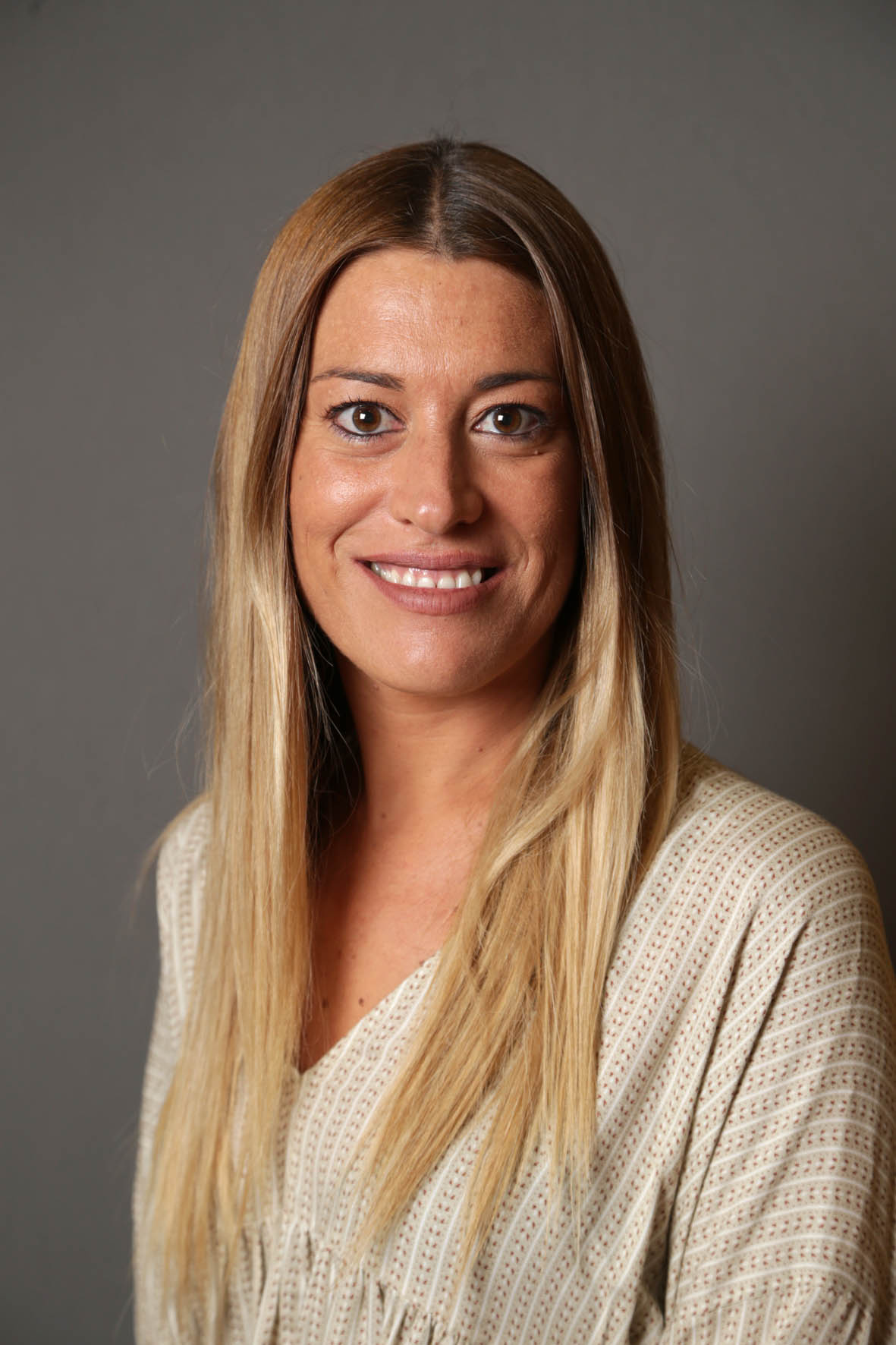
- Nogueras in November 2015

Spokesperson of the Together for Catalonia Group in the Congress of Deputies
- Incumbent
- Assumed office 14 September 2023
- Preceded by: Laura Borràs (2021)

Member of the Congress of Deputies
- Incumbent
- Assumed office 9 January 2016
- Constituency: Barcelona

Member of Cardedeu Municipal Council
- In office 2015–2017
- Succeeded by: Rosario Company Jiménez

Personal details
- Born: Míriam Nogueras Camero; 11 May 1980 (age 45) Dosrius, Catalonia, Spain
- Party: Junts (2020–present)
- Other political affiliations: Catalan European Democratic Party (2016–2020); Independent (2015–2016)
- Children: 2

Míriam Nogueras i Camero (Catalan pronunciation: [ˈmiɾiam nuˈɣeɾəs]; born 11 May 1980) is a Spanish businesswoman and politician from Catalonia who serves as Member of the Congress of Deputies of Spain.

== Early life ==
Nogueras was born on 11 May 1980 in Dosrius, Catalonia. She is currently studying for a post graduate degree in digital marketing and electronic commerce.

== Career ==
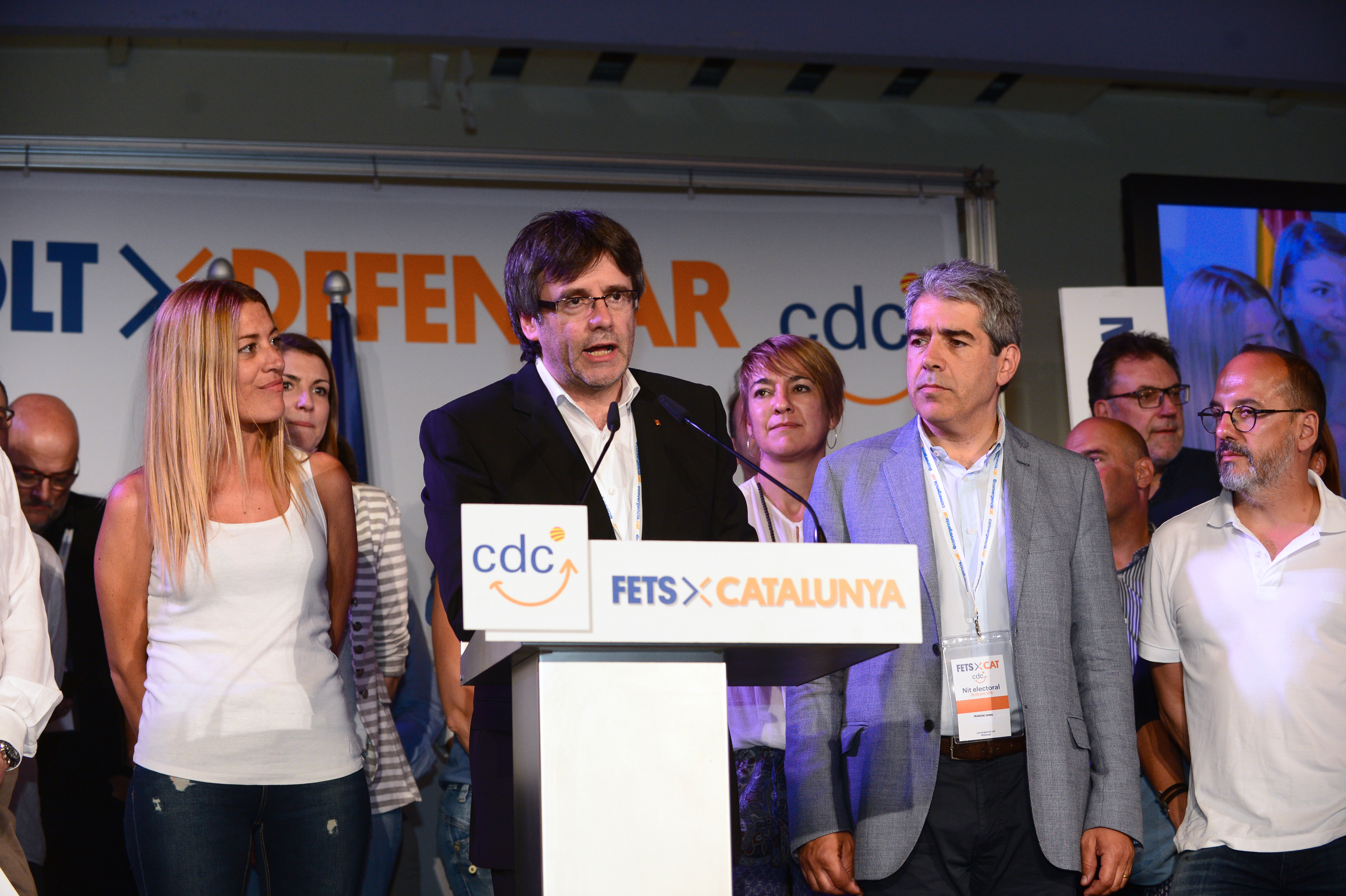
Nogueras at the CDC's "Nit electoral" event on 26 June 2016

Nogueras is a co-owner of a textile company specialising in spinning. She is an executive committee member of the Catalan Business Circle (Cercle Català de Negocis) and a board member of ASECIEMA (textile business association) and MODACC (textile fashion cluster).

Nogueras contested the 2015 local elections as a Convergence and Union (CiU) electoral alliance candidate in Cardedeu and was elected. She contested the 2015 general election as a Democracy and Freedom (DiL) electoral alliance candidate in the Province of Barcelona and was elected to the Congress of Deputies. She was re-elected at the 2016 and 2019 general elections. In July 2018 she was elected vice-president of the Catalan European Democratic Party (PDeCAT).

In May 2018 Nogueras won the nomination to be the Together for Catalonia (JuntsxCat)'s mayoral candidate in Mataró at the 2019 local elections. However, at the 2019 local elections Nogueras was placed 27th on the JxCat's list of candidates in Mataró but the alliance only managed to win two seats in the municipality and as a result she failed to get elected. In July 2020 she left the executive of the PDeCAT.

Nogueras is part of the "No vull pagar" anti-toll campaign.

== Positions ==
Close to the positions of Carles Puigdemont and Quim Torra and a staunch supporter of Catalan independence, she considers Spain to be a "rotten manure heap".

== Electoral history ==
Electoral history of Míriam Nogueras
Election	Constituency	Party	Alliance	No.	Result
2015 local	Cardedeu	Independent	Convergence and Union	2	Elected
2015 general	Province of Barcelona	Independent	Democracy and Freedom	4	Elected
2016 general	Province of Barcelona	Independent	Democratic Convergence of Catalonia	4	Elected
2019 general	Province of Barcelona	Catalan European Democratic Party	Together for Catalonia	3	Elected
2019 local	Mataró	Catalan European Democratic Party	Together for Catalonia	27	Not elected
2023 general	Province of Barcelona	Together for Catalonia	None	1	Elected

== Personal life ==
Nogueras has two children.
