= Maribel Vaquero =

Spanish politician (born 1970)

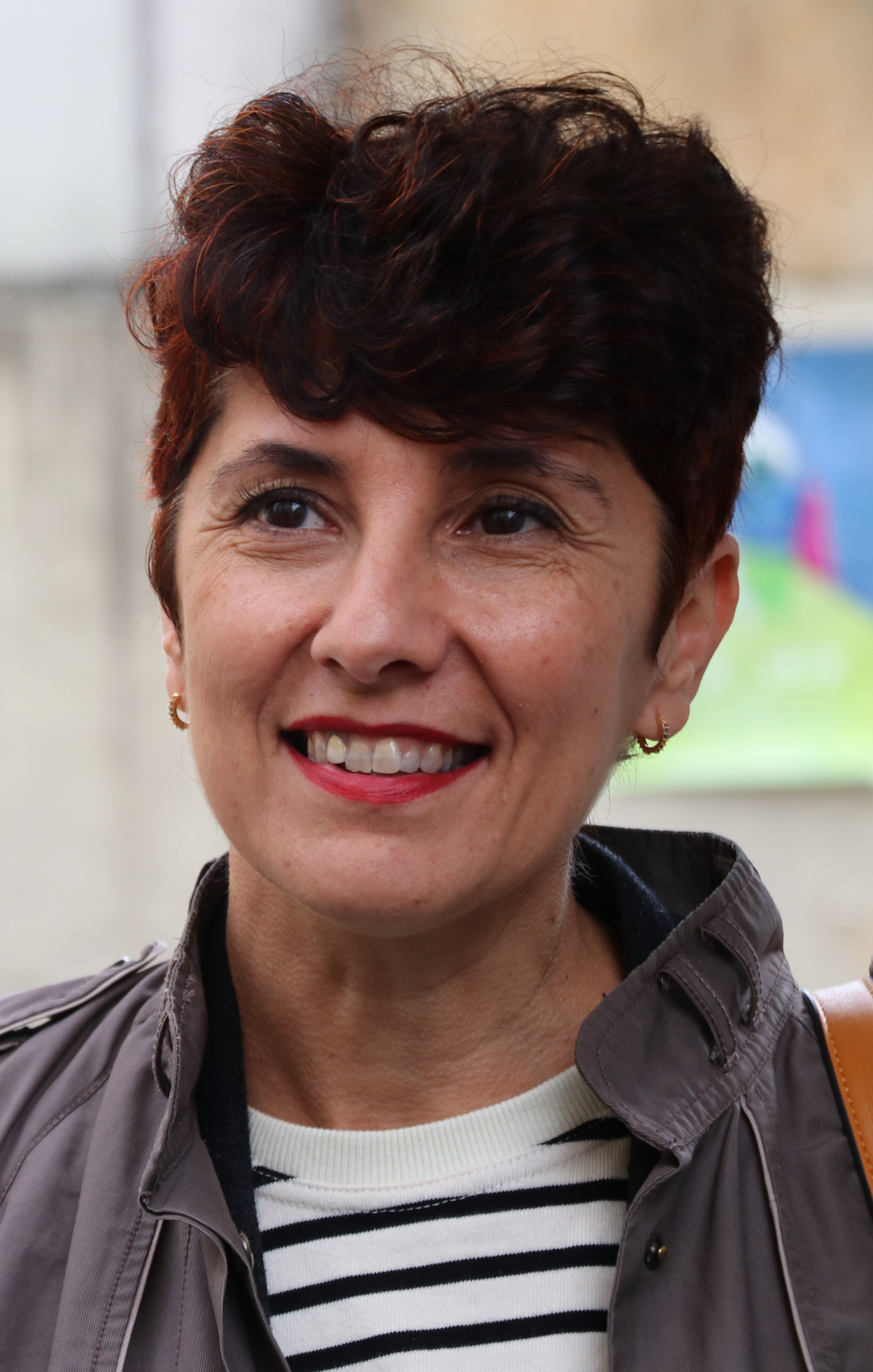
- Vaquero in 2019

Member of the Congress of Deputies
- Incumbent
- Assumed office 17 August 2023
- Constituency: Gipuzkoa

Member of the Senate
- In office 28 April 2019 – 29 May 2023
- Constituency: Gipuzkoa

Personal details
- Born: 26 May 1970 (age 56)
- Party: Basque Nationalist Party
- Education: University of the Basque Country

María Isabel Vaquero Montero (born 26 May 1970), better known as Maribel Vaquero, is a Spanish politician from the Basque Country. She has served as a member of the Congress of Deputies since 2023. From 2019 to 2023, she was a member of the Senate. A member of the Basque Nationalist Party, she represents Gipuzkoa.

== Biography ==
She was born in Urnieta, Basque Country, on May 26, 1970. She received her law degree from the University of the Basque Country.

== Career ==
She became a member of Senate in 2019. She was elected to the Congress of Deputies in the 2023 Spanish general election. In 2025, she became the first female spokesperson for the Basque Nationalist Party in the Congress of Deputies.
