= Broad Front (Spain) =

Broad Front Frente Amplio
- Abbreviation: FA
- Leader: Ada Colau
- Founded: 21 February 2026
- Preceded by: Sumar
- Ideology: Progressivism
- Political position: Left-wing
- Colours: Orange; Vermilion
- Members: See composition
- Congress of Deputies: 0 / 350
- Spanish Senate: 0 / 266
- European Parliament (Spanish seats): 0 / 61

Website
- frenteamplio.info

Broad Front (Spanish: Frente Amplio, FA), previously known at first under the slogan of its launching event, Un Paso al Frente (lit. 'A Step Forward'), is an electoral alliance established ahead of the 2026 Spanish general election, announced by United Left (IU), Unite Movement (MS), Más Madrid and Catalonia in Common (Comuns). The official name of the alliance was revealed on 25 September 2026. It superseded the previous Sumar alliance, and is left open for other parties such as Podemos to join, though the latter rejected joining any such alliance. Parties such as Coalició Compromís, Més per Mallorca and Chunta Aragonesista (CHA) were expected to join at some point, with this being confirmed for Més and CHA in October 2026. Batzarre, Andalusian People's Initiative, Somos Asturies, Zero Cuts, and Republican Alternative also joined the alliance.

The alliance's platform and candidate were scheduled to be announced on 17 October 2026. Ultimately, Ada Colau was announced as candidate on 12 October, in response to Gabriel Rufián's Republican Left of Catalonia and Podemos signing a separate alliance in Catalan provinces.

== History ==
The proposal was launched in a political event on 21 February 2026, attended by all Spanish government ministers of the Sumar platform (Ernest Urtasun, Mónica García, Pablo Bustinduy and Sira Rego), except for the second deputy prime minister and labour minister, Yolanda Díaz. While Díaz was considered by the founding parties as the alliance's prime ministerial candidate, she formally rejected it on 25 February 2026.

The political parties within the space have struggled for months to find a common platform and lead candidate. Republican Left of Catalonia (ERC)'s spokesperson in the Congress of Deputies, Gabriel Rufián, proposed a broad front of left-wing parties (either directly or through coordination) that also included peripheral nationalists such as ERC, EH Bildu and the Galician Nationalist Bloc, and was himself touted as a prospective candidate, but he rejected such possibility in September 2026. That same month, Podemos's lead candidate Irene Montero suggested standing in a single open primary of the entire left-wing space, a proposal met with both interest and scepticism by other parties. Other names that have been speculated by the media include two of Sumar's ministers (Bustinduy and Urtasun), Ada Colau (former mayor of Barcelona), and Unai Sordo (secretary general of the Workers' Commissions trade union). Ultimately, Podemos signed a separate pact with the Republican Left of Catalonia.

The possibility of a snap general election being called over the 2026 Spanish housing protests has forced the political parties to the left of the Spanish Socialist Workers' Party to vastly accelerate their plans to select a joint candidate and establish a common platform. After a meeting of Sumar's government ministers and with Prime Minister Pedro Sánchez gathering opinions on the advisability of calling the election, 17 October 2026 was set as the date for the announcement of the Broad Front's platform and candidate.

== Composition ==
FA and regional-aligned alliances for the Congress of Deputies

Party	Scope
Unite Movement (MS)	Nationwide
We Are Progressive Party (SPP) (Note: Created by Catalunya en Comú with the aim of protecting the name "Somos" and preventing it from being used by other political groups or actors.)	Nationwide
Greens Equo–Green Party (VQ–PV)	Nationwide
Zero Cuts (Recortes Cero)	Nationwide
Republican Alternative (ALTER)	Nationwide
United Left (IU)	Nationwide
Communist Party of Spain (PCE)	Nationwide
The Dawn Marxist Organization (La Aurora (OM))	Nationwide
Republican Left (IR)	
Unitarian Candidacy of Workers (CUT)	Andalusia
Más Madrid (MM)	Community of Madrid
Catalonia In Common (Comuns)	Catalonia
Barcelona in Common (BComú)	Catalonia
Green Left (EV)	Catalonia
Aragonese Union (CHA)	Aragon
Assembly (Batzarre)	Navarre
Andalusian People's Initiative (IdPA)	Andalusia
Asturian Left (IAS)	Asturias
Regional-aligned alliances
Valencian Front (Compromís–Front Valencià)	Valencian Community
Canarian People's Unity (UPC)	Canary Islands
Now More–Broad Front (Ara Més–EU–MS)	Balearic Islands
