= Montoro affair =

Corruption scandal in Spain

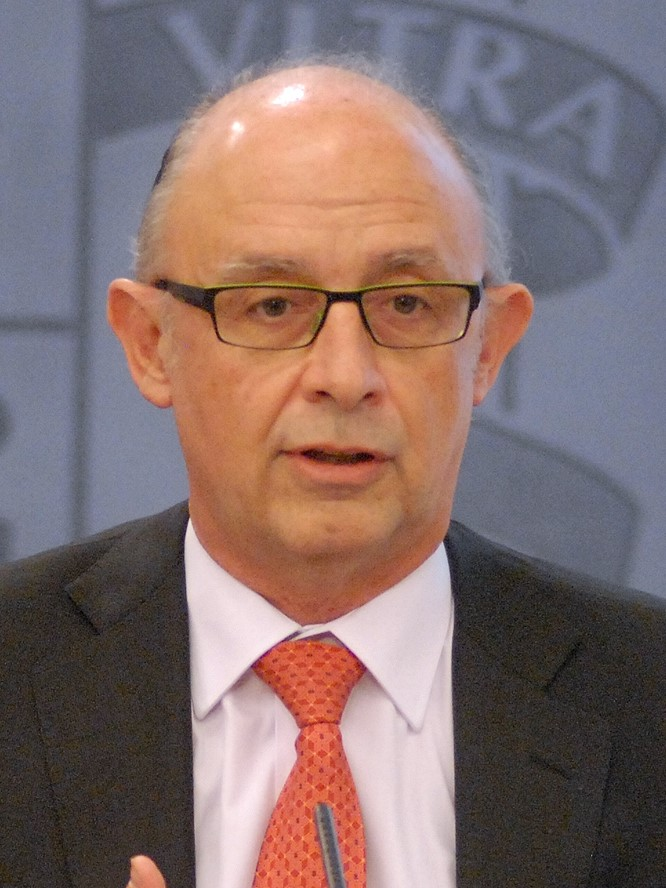
Cristóbal Montoro in 2012

The Montoro affair (Spanish: caso Montoro) is a political corruption case in Spain, involving an alleged cash-for-favours, lobbying and influence peddling network operated by former Finance minister of Spain, Cristóbal Montoro, while at the helm of that ministry during the premiership of Mariano Rajoy. Investigations were ongoing since August 2018 but were not unveiled until July 2025. In March 2026, the judicial probe expanded into Montoro's "complete" banking information.

The ongoing judicial investigation focuses on the alleged favoritism shown to companies (gas, renewables, or gambling) by creating tax regulations and reforms in exchange for direct payments to the law firm Equipo Económico (English: "Economic Team"), founded by Montoro in 2006. This firm is considered the "epicenter of an alleged corruption scheme accused of benefiting companies in exchange for money". Among other cases, this firm allegedly received "almost one million euros so that the Ministry of Finance under Montoro would approve two tailor-made tax reforms", according to an investigation by the Spanish Tax Agency in February 2026. The legislative changes were allegedly approved against the advice of the experts.

The companies that paid this law firm allegedly benefited from both the legal reforms promoted by the former People's Party minister and from privileged information on the General State Budget before the Spanish parliament itself. According to the judicial investigation, Montoro's tax scheme would have obtained a total of nearly 50 million euros in kickbacks. Furthermore, the companies involved would have allegedly enjoyed a tax benefit of 2.2 billion euros in 2012.
