= Zapatero affair =

Corruption investigation in Spain

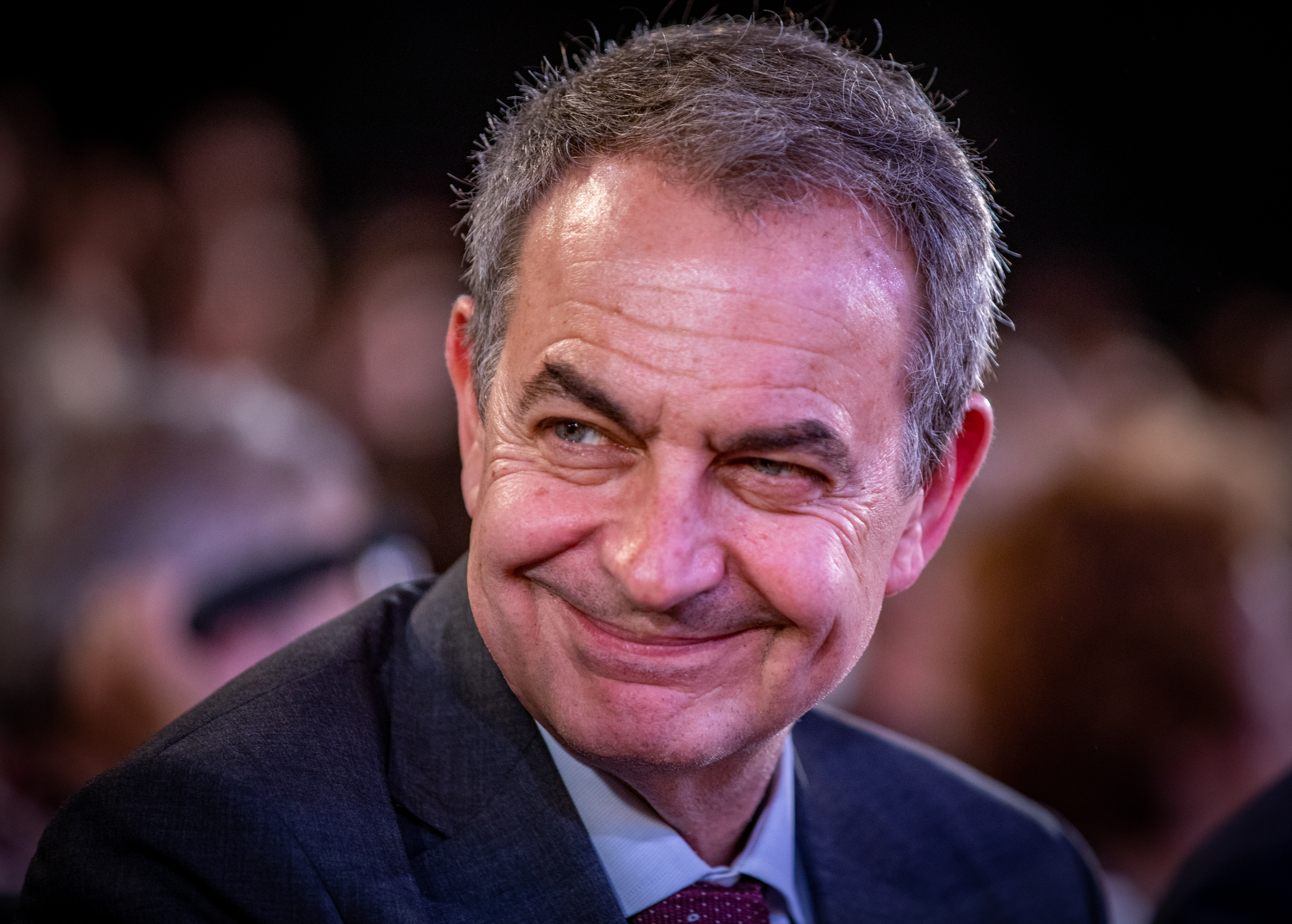
José Luis Rodríguez Zapatero

The Zapatero affair or Plus Ultra affair is an ongoing judicial investigation by the National Court of Spain regarding an alleged corruption scheme (including influence peddling, money laundering and creation of shell corporations) that benefited from the bailout of the Spanish airline Plus Ultra Líneas Aéreas in 2021, during the COVID-19 pandemic. The case gained prominence in May 2026 after José Luis Rodríguez Zapatero, former prime minister of Spain, was indicted for allegedly leading the scheme and using his influence to force the State Company for Industrial Investments (SEPI) to authorise the bailout. The case took a new turn after a police search of Zapatero's offices found various pieces of jewelry—with an estimated value of 1.3 million euros—whose origin is still pending justification.

The investigation claims the existence of an organized scheme allegedly dedicated to influencing administrative and financial decisions through a network of intermediaries, shell companies, and high-level political contacts, operating both in Spain and abroad, particularly in countries such as Venezuela or the United Arab Emirates. Subsequently, the investigation was expanded with a separate probe concerning the jewelry found during the police search in Zapatero's office, for possible tax fraud and smuggling crimes. Despite clues, inferences and indirect links, the investigation has yet to offer any direct evidence against Zapatero himself. The former prime minister has defended his innocence while seeking the annulment of the case, claiming the proceedings violated his fundamental rights, both because the circumstantial evidence against him was allegedly obtained illegally, and because of persistent data breaches of the judicial summary and of his private information to the media.

The case shook the ruling government of Spain, both because Zapatero remained a close political ally to the incumbent prime minister, Pedro Sánchez, and because it came amid other corruption probes on other Sánchez allies and relatives. Both Sánchez's government and his Spanish Socialist Workers' Party have defended Zapatero's innocence and at a point even suggested that he could be a victim of a lawfare campaign against Sánchez by right-wing media and judicial sectors, but privately conceded that Zapatero's lobbying activities damaged the ethical image and public example he had cultivated in comparison with other former prime ministers.

== Origins ==
In 2021, after the concession of several public aid to companies after the COVID-19 pandemic, several Spanish organisations and political parties questioned the legality and suitability regarding the €53 million bailout of the Plus Ultra airline, that flies between Spain and South America.

The far-right union Manos Limpias (Spanish for "Clean Hands") and the opposition People's and Vox parties presented complaints considering the airline did not meet the requirements to be considered strategic for the Spanish economy, and reported alleged crimes of embezzlement, abuse of power, bribery and influence peddling. However, these proceedings were archived by the Madrid Court of Instruction number 5 after not finding sufficient evidence.

== New evidence ==
In 2024, the Spanish Anti-Corruption Prosecutor's Office received cooperation requests from France and Switzerland related to possible fraudulent activities of money laundering regarding the Plus Ultra bailout. The Prosecutor's Office presented a report to the National Court of Spain and started confidential investigations.

In March 2026, the Economic and Fiscal Crime Unit (UDEF) of the National Police Corps received information from the United States Department of Homeland Security regarding phone transcripts of Rodolfo Reyes, Venezuelan president of Plus Ultra, that describe the scheme and incriminate former prime minister José Luis Rodríguez Zapatero. On 19 May 2026, the National Court judge José Luis Calama ended the confidentiality of the investigations and released a court order summoning former president Zapatero to declare in court and issuing search warrants to several officers linked to him. The court order stated that the investigations found an "organised and stable structure" allegedly dedicated to influence peddling and obtaining economic advantages through institutional and corporate contracts.
