= Greens Equo of the Valencian Country =

Greens Equo of the Valencian Country Verds Equo del País Valencià
- Leader: Natxo Serra Frontela; Cristina Rodríguez
- Founded: 18 October 2014
- Merger of: The Greens–Ecologist Left of the Valencian Country; Equo Valencian Federation
- Headquarters: Plaça del Pilar, 1 46001 (València)
- Youth wing: Joves Verds Equo
- Ideology: Ecologism; Green politics Federalism; Valencianism
- Political position: Left-wing
- National affiliation: Greens Equo
- Regional affiliation: Coalició Compromís
- Colours: Green
- Corts Valencianes: 2 / 99
- Local seats: 14 / 5,784

Website
- verds.compromis.net

Greens Equo of the Valencian Country (Catalan: Verds Equo del País Valencià, VerdsEquo) is a Valencianist and ecologist political party based in the Valencian Community, Spain. VerdsEquo is a part of the Compromís coalition, and is the Valencian branch of Greens Equo. From July 2025, the party started to name themselves as "Greens–Commitment" (Catalan: Verds–Compromís).

== Ideology ==
According to its statutes, the fundamental purpose of VerdsEquo is to promote a project of sustainable society based on political ecology, social equity and participatory democracy, assuming as their own the goals and objectives of federal Greens Equo. VerdsEquo will also support the recovery and development of the cultural, linguistic and social personality of the Valencian Country.

== History ==
VerdsEquo was created in 2014 as a result of the merger of two previous political parties: The Greens - Ecologist Left of the Valencian Country (EV-EE) and the Valencian federation of Equo (Equo PV).

In 2015 and 2019, VerdsEquo had two deputies in the Valencian Parliament, Juan Ponce and Cristina Rodríguez Armigen, that were elected as part of the Compromís coalition in the 2015 Valencian elections.

In 2023, VerdsEquo had two deputies in the Valencian Parliament, Juan Bordera (as independent) and Paula Espinosa, that were elected as part of the Compromís coalition in the 2023 Valencian elections.

The current spokespersons of the party are Natxo Serra Frontela and Cristina Rodríguez.
