= Valencianism =

Valencianism (Valencian: valencianisme [valensiaˈnizme]) is a political ideology of nationalist or regionalist character whose objective is the defense of the Valencian Community (also known as Valencian Country) and its culture by the means of the establishment and strengthening of its own institutions.

Types of Valencianism include:

- Blaverism, a political movement that aims to the recovery of the identity, language, history and traditions of the Valencian Community (Former Kingdom of Valencia) characterised by strong Anti-Catalanism.
- Valencian nationalism, a political movement that advocates to maintain and promote the recognition of the linguistic, cultural and political personality of the Valencian Country.
- Valencian regionalism, a cultural and political movement that aims to the recovery of the identity (language, history, traditions and other peculiarities) of the Region of Valencia.
