= Heart of the Warrior =

- Theatrical release poster
- Spanish: El corazón del guerrero
- Directed by: Daniel Monzón
- Written by: Daniel Monzón
- Produced by: Gerardo Herrero
- Starring: Fernando Ramallo; Neus Asensi; Joel Joan; Santiago Segura; Javier Aller; Adrià Collado
- Cinematography: Carles Gusi
- Music by: Roque Baños
- Production companies: Tornasol Films; Creativos Asociados de Radio y Televisión
- Release date: 21 January 2000
- Country: Spain
- Language: Spanish
- Budget: 500 million ₧

Heart of the Warrior (Spanish: El corazón del guerrero) is a 2000 Spanish action-adventure film directed and written by Daniel Monzón, which stars Fernando Ramallo, Joel Joan and Neus Asensi, also featuring Santiago Segura, Adrià Collado, and Javier Aller, among others.

== Plot ==
Beldar and Sonja, a pair of thieves, steal a precious stone shaped like a human heart from the eerie crypt of the Order of the Thousand Eyes, a malevolent sect of all-powerful sorcerers. As they flee, they realize the gem is cursed and has transferred its spell to them. After losing consciousness, Beldar awakens in another world, transformed into the body of a acne-ridden Madrid boy named Ramón Belda.

Belda is a boy with a vivid imagination, plagued by recurring visions that correspond to the role-playing games he plays every night with his friends. He is also a timid and frail boy, but in his imagination, he sees himself battling all kinds of dangers. Dangers that, little by little, will become real and connect present-day Madrid with a universe in which Ramón is the Chosen One for a mission of epic dimensions, with heroines, magicians and powerful fighters.

== Cast ==
- Fernando Ramallo as Ramón.
- Joel Joan as Beldar.
- Neus Asensi as Sonya.
- Santiago Segura as Netheril.
- Adrià Collado
- Javier Aller
- Jaime Barnatán
- Adolfo Fernández
- Luis Tosar
- Arturo Valls

== Production ==
It is Monzón's debut film. He also wrote it. Gerardo Herrero took over production duties. A Tornasol Films and Creativos Asociados de Radio y Televisión production, the film had a 500 million peseta budget. The score was composed by Roque Baños. Filming took 11 weeks.

== Release ==
The film was screened in Lanzarote in December 1999 during a film industry meeting with European distributors. It was theatrically released in Spain on 21 January 2000.

== Accolades ==
Year	Award	Category	Nominee(s)	Result	Ref.
2001	15th Goya Awards	Best New Director	Daniel Monzón	Nominated	
2001	15th Goya Awards	Best Production Supervision	Tino Pont	Nominated	

== See also ==
- List of Spanish films of 2000
