= Carlos, rey emperador =

- Genre: Historical drama
- Directed by: Oriol Ferrer
- Starring: Álvaro Cervantes; Blanca Suárez
- Theme music composer: Federico Jusid
- Country of origin: Spain
- Original language: Spanish
- No. of seasons: 1
- No. of episodes: 17

Production
- Executive producers: Jaume Banacolocha; Montse García
- Producer: Nicolás Romero
- Running time: 70 minutes
- Production company: Diagonal TV for Televisión Española

Original release
- Network: La 1
- Release: September 7, 2015 – January 25, 2016

Related
- Isabel; The Broken Crown

Carlos, rey emperador (transl. 'Charles, Emperor King') is a Spanish historical fiction television series based upon the reign of Charles V (Carlos I to the Spanish), directed by Oriol Ferrer and produced by Diagonal TV for Televisión Española. It was broadcast on La 1 of Televisión Española from 2015 to 2016. The series is the sequel to the film The Broken Crown, which in turn is the sequel to the series Isabel produced by the same production company.

== Plot ==
The series tells the story of Charles I or Charles V, Holy Roman Emperor, one of the most powerful men Europe has seen, the ruler of an empire as great in size as in diversity.

As the life of Charles of Habsburg is told since his arrival to Spain, it can be seen how the heir to the crowns of Germany, Burgundy, the Netherlands, the territories of the Crown of Aragon and its related Italian territories, and of the territories of the Catholic Monarchs in Castile, North Africa and the Americas, matures as a statesman and gets stronger in face of menaces around him and good and bad advice from his counselors.

== Cast and characters ==
| Actor | Role |
|---|---|
| Álvaro Cervantes | Charles I |
| Blanca Suárez | Isabella of Portugal |
| Laia Marull | Joanna of Castile (played by Irene Escolar in 'Isabel') |
| Eric Balbàs | Ferdinand of Habsburg |
| Laia Costa | Mary of Austria |
| Guiomar Puerta | Catherine of Austria |
| Marina Salas | Eleanor of Austria |
| Mónica López | Margaret of Habsburg |
| Pablo Arbués | Philip II of Spain (child) |
| Marcel Borràs | Philip II of Spain (adult) |
| Elisabeth Larena | Mary of Austria and Portugal |
| Félix Gómez | Fernando Álvarez de Toledo |
| Alfonso Bassave | Francis I of France |
| María Hervás | Marguerite of Angoulême |
| Eva Rufo | Claude of France |
| Alberto Amarilla | Henry II of France |
| Susi Sánchez | Louise of Savoy |
| Alberto San Juan | Charles III, Duke of Bourbon |
| Joan Crosas | Manuel I of Portugal |
| Tamar Novas | John III of Portugal |
| Mélida Molina | Catherine of Aragon |
| Àlex Brendemühl | Henry VIII of England |
| Ángel de Andrés López | Pope Clement VII |
| Carlos Kaniowsky | Pope Leo X |
| Francisco Olmo | Pope Paul III |
| Francesc Orella | Cardinal Adrian of Utrecht |
| Ferran Audí | Thomas Cromwell |
| Blai Llopis | Cardinal Thomas Wolsey |
| Itsaso Arana | Maria Manuela of Portugal |
| Mingo Ràfols | Martin Luther |
| Andrés Lima | Frederick of Saxony |
| Jaroslaw Bielsky | Jakob Fugger |
| Helio Pedregal | William de Croÿ |
| Juanjo Puigcorbé | Mercurino Gattinara |
| Ramón Barea | Fadrique Álvarez de Toledo |
| Víctor Clavijo | Francis Borgia |
| Roberto Álvarez | Juan Pardo de Tavera |
| Fele Martínez | Nicolas Perrenot de Granvelle |
| Daniel Pérez | Anne de Montmorency |
| Carlos Álvarez-Nóvoa | Leonardo da Vinci |
| Meritxell Calvo | Françoise de Foix |
| Nathalie Poza | Germaine de Foix |
| Irene Ruiz | María Pacheco |
| Israel Elejalde | Juan López de Padilla |
| Alberto Iglesias | Antonio de Mendoza |
| Óscar Rabadán | Bartolomé de las Casas |
| José Luis García Pérez | Hernán Cortés |
| Víctor Dupla | Luis Ponce de León |
| Lucía Barrado | Catalina Juárez |
| Iazua Larios | La Malinche |
| Christian Esquivel | Moctezuma II |
| Nelson Dante | Cuauhtémoc |
| Juanma Lara | Diego Velázquez de Cuéllar |
| José Maya | Francisco Pizarro |
| - | Isabella of Austria |
| Bianca Ceausescu | Anne de Pisseleu d'Heilly |
| José Coronado | Maximilian I, Holy Roman Emperor |
| Ángela Cremonte | Mary Tudor |
| Lucía Fuertes | Joanna of Austria |
| Pepe Ocio | Gerónimo de Aguilar |
| Fiorella Faltoyano | Anne of France |
| Eusebio Poncela | Francisco Jiménez de Cisneros |
| Mingo Ràfols i Olea | |

== Episodes and ratings ==
| No. | Title | Original release date | Viewers (millions) |
|---|---|---|---|
| 1 | "El extranjero, ("The foreigner")" | 7 September 2015 | 2.783 (15.6%) |
| 2 | "La rapiña, ("The plundering")" | 14 September 2015 | 2.606 (14.0%) |
| 3 | "O César o nada, ("Caesar or nothing")" | 21 September 2015 | 2.553 (13.5%) |
| 4 | "El imperio a subasta, ("an empire to auction")" | 28 September 2015 | 2.564 (13.4%) |
| 5 | "Un reino en llamas, ("a realm in flames")" | 5 October 2015 | 2.259 (11.4%) |
| 6 | "La herejía y la guerra, ("The heresy and the war")" | 12 October 2015 | 2.285 (12.5%) |
| 7 | "El arduo camino hacia la victoria, ("The arduous way to victory")" | 19 October 2015 | 2.271 (11.7%) |
| 8 | "La prisión de un Rey, ("The prison of a king")" | 26 October 2015 | 2.301 (12.1%) |
| 9 | "Una larga luna de miel, ("A long honeymoon")" | 2 November 2015 | 1.988 (10.1%) |
| 10 | "El apestado, ("The plagued one/unwanted one")" | 9 November 2015 | 2.077 (10.4%) |
| 11 | "Todos debemos ser uno, ("We must be one")" | 16 November 2015 | 1.917 (9.7%) |
| 12 | "Los demonios, ("The devils/demons")" | 23 November 2015 | 1.925 (11,5%) |
| 13 | "De amor y muerte, ("Of love and death")" | 23 November 2015 | 1.925 (11,5%) |
| 14 | "Educando a Felipe, ("Educating Felipe")" | 11 January 2016 | 1.826 (9.3%) |
| 15 | "La sucesión, ("The succession")" | 18 January 2016 | 1.773 (9.0%) |
| 16 | "Deseo de ser nadie, ("The wish of being nobody")" | 25 January 2016 | 1.891 (11.4%) |
| 17 | "Padre, ("Father")" | 25 January 2016 | 1.891 (11.4%) |
