= Jimmy Barnatán =

- Born: Jaime Barnatán Pereda; 2 July 1981 (age 44); Madrid, Spain
- Occupations: singer, actor, writer
- Website: twitter.com/jimmybarnatan

Jaime Barnatán Pereda (born 2 July 1981), known as Jimmy Barnatán, is a Spanish singer, actor and writer. His origins lie in the district of Chamartín in Madrid (Madrid), although he spent part of his childhood in New York due to family reasons. There, he usually went to the church with his grandmother, and he soon became impressed by the Gospel choirs. He also surrounded himself with black musicians and was captivated with the blues they played. In fact, his style is unmistakably American, and arguably his voice, powerful and torn, is one of the most singular in the Spanish national scene.

His relationship with the theatre and the big screen also starts very soon. Jimmy is a multifaceted artist. He was born of the marriage between the writer Marcos Ricardo Barnatán and the journalist Rosa Pereda.

== Biography ==
Jimmy Barnatán was born in Madrid, but his heart is divided between the capital of Spain, Madrid and New York. Since its early years, he showed great admiration for the performing arts, and soon experienced the desire to get on the stage of a theatre. His claim was answered in 1992, when he was just 11 years: then, the young Jimmy managed to join the cast of Les Misérables, a musical produced by José Tamayo and Plácido Domingo, in association with Cameron Mackintosh, which was presented on 16 September in the New Apolo Theatre in Madrid, as an adaptation of the classic that inspired the novel by Victor Hugo. The success was overwhelming.

After that experience, Barnatán landed on television and performed sketches on entertainment programs as The Worst Week Program (El Peor Programa de la Semana) (1994) or Innocent, Innocent (Inocente, Inocente) (1995). That year took place his leap to the big screen thanks to director Alex de la Iglesia, who entrusted him the role of possessed child in the iconic film The Day of the Beast (El Dia de la Bestia). In 1996 he started in television fiction with Milk Brothers (Hermanos de leche), sharing cast with actors like Jose Coronado or Juan Echanove, and, a year later, he returned to the theatre, to represent Between two shores (Entre dos orillas) (1997) at the Teatro de la Maestranza in Seville. Since then, Jimmy has been part of a lot of projects in all formats, highlighting Torrente, the dumb arm of the law (Torrente, el brazo tonto de la ley), Heart of the Warrior (El corazón del guerrero), The Biggest Robbery Never Told (El robo más grande jamás contado) and Los Serrano, a TV series that gave him an enormous popularity thanks to the role of Chucky.

He has participated in several short films, being director of three of them from 1998 to 2005. He did the same in a documentary (Racing Blues. History of a feeling) (Racing Blues. Historia de un sentimiento) (2007) in which, alongside Fernando Guisado, he narrated the adventures of an historic Spanish football team, the Racing de Santander.

In music, the journey of Barnatán also began in New York, where he used to go due to family reasons. One day, he had the opportunity to get on a stage surrounded by black Blues singers, and his intervention was warmly applauded by them. Jimmy said in an interview with daily El País:

Since I was a child, I used to go, first with my grandmother and, later, alone, to a Harlem church to hear gospel. I started to be interested in black music and, one day, at 16 or so, I slipped with a friend at Arthur's Tavern, mythical place, to see a concert. When it finished, it started a jam session and I started to sing... the musicians liked the way I did and they summoned me to return whenever I wanted. From there, everything ran.

In Spain, he began his career as a vocalist with Caronte's Ferry, and later went on to lead the San Telmo Blues Band, covering in both formations the great American classics. In 2010 he released his first studio album with the title Black Note, showing the influences received from those vinyl of Lionel Hampton, Ella Fitzgerald and Louis Armstrong that he listened to at home. It was a subtle tribute to all those legends of Jazz, Blues and Soul that saw him grow. The album was presented at the legendary Sala Clamores of Madrid, causing a pleasant surprise to those who, until then, had enjoyed her performance in the big screen and in television. Soon after, he began recording with Back Door Band what turned out to be his second album, After the blue Times (2011), this time with the seal of Warner Music Spain. While preparing the above releases, the multifaceted artist had time to write two novels: Atlas (2005) and New York Blues (2012). After that, he continued his career in the music scene constituting the group Jimmy Barnatán & The Cocooners, with whom he has released Room 13: A Blues Tale (2013) and Motorclub (2015).

Meanwhile, Jimmy has continued exercising his profession as an actor in projects like The Hurd, land with a soul (Las Hurdes, tierra con alma) (2015), documentary still unreleased for which he has also composed the soundtrack. Musically, he toured Spain accompanying the Texan guitarist Carvin Jones, and drew up part of the soundtrack of My big night (Mi gran noche) (2015), the new film by Alex de la Iglesia. Moreover, he has already prepared what will be his third novel, The Topper of Memphis (La Chistera de Memphis), whose publication is expected for the coming months.

== Filmography ==
=== Film ===
==== Full-length films ====
- Torrente 5, by Santiago Segura (2014), as Acrobat Kenny.
- The heredity Valdemar (La herencia Valdemar), by José Luis Alemán (2010), as Garbea.
- Eskalofrío, by Isidro Ortiz (2008), as Leo.
- Sexykiller (morirás por ella), de Miguel Martí (2008), como garden guy.
- Ángeles S.A., by Eduard Bosch (2007), as Thunder.
- Skedaddle (Salir pitando), by Álvaro Fernández Armero (2007), as Paco.
- Don't say anything (No digas nada), by Felipe Jiménez Luna (2007), as Rodrigo.
- Poor youth (Pobre juventud), by Miguel Jiménez (2006), as Víctor.
- Torrente 3: the protector (Torrente 3: el protector), by Santiago Segura (2005), as José María.
- The Biggest Robbery Never Told (El robo más grande jamás contado), by Daniel Monzón (2002), as Jacobo Yuste "Windows".
- Visionaries (Visionarios), by Manuel Gutiérrez Aragón (2000), as Patxi.
- Masterpiece (Obra maestra), by David Trueba (2000), as musical dairy.
- Dying of laughter (Muertos de risa), by Álex de la Iglesia (1999), as pastry child ad.
- Heart of the Warrior (El corazón del guerrero), by Daniel Monzón (1999), as Javi.
- Torrente, the dumb arm of the law (Torrente, el brazo tonto de la ley), by Santiago Segura (1998), as Toneti.
- The Day of the Beast (El día de la bestia), by Álex de la Iglesia (1995), as possessed child.

==== Short films ====
===== As an actor =====
- Los que sueñan despiertos, de Félix Viscarret (2005).
- Chico meets chica, de Samuel Abrahams (2005).
- Lo que el ojo no ve, de José Braña (2004).
- Canciones de invierno, de Félix Viscarret (2004).
- Unas pellas, de César Strawberry (2001).
- Caballo, de Jimmy Barnatán (2001).

===== As a director =====
- Macarra (2005).
- Caballo (2001).
- Gris (1998).

==== Medium length films ====
===== As a director =====
- Racing Blues. Historia de un sentimiento (2007), co-directed by Fernando Guisado (DOC).

=== Television ===
- Servir y proteger, tve1, (2018), as fede
- Museo Coconut, Neox (2011), as thug wheelchair.
- Los Serrano, Telecinco (2003–2008), as Chucky.
- After school (Al salir de clase), Telecinco (2001), as Elio.
- Commissioner (El Comisario), Telecinco (2000).
- Petra delicado, Telecinco (1999), como Tito.
- Milk Brothers (Hermanos de leche), Antena 3 (1996).
- Innocent, innocent (Inocente, inocente), Telemadrid (1995).
- The Worst Week Program (El peor programa de la semana), TVE (1994).

== Theatre ==
- Los Miserables, by Victor Hugo. An adaptation of the classic that inspired the novel by Victor Hugo. Teatro Nuevo Apolo, Madrid (1992).
- Between two shores (Entre dos orillas). Teatro de la Maestranza, Sevilla (1997).
- Shitz by Hanoch Levin (2011).

== Music ==
- First band: Caronte's Ferry (blues/rock).
- Lead singer of the San Telmo Blues Band (blues/rock).

=== With the San Telmo Music Factory ===
- Black Note (2010).

=== With the Back Door Band ===
- After the blue times (2011).

=== With Jimmy Barnatán and The Cocooners ===
- Room 13: A Blues Tale (2013).
- Motorclub (2015).

== Works ==
- Atlas (novel). Editorial Trama (2005).
- New York Blues (novel). Editorial La Esfera de los Libros (2012)
- Collaboration with the newspaper World on its website with the electoral notebook Making friends.
- Collaboration with the newspaper World on its website with the blog At full night (A toda noche).

== Awards ==
- XI National Short Film Contest 2004.
