= Me he hecho viral =

- Theatrical release poster
- Directed by: Jorge Coira
- Screenplay by: Araceli Gonda
- Produced by: María Luisa Gutiérrez; Mercedes Gamero; Cabe Bossi; Pol Bossi; Maximiliano Lasansky
- Starring: Blanca Suárez
- Cinematography: José Luis Bernal
- Edited by: Jorge Coira
- Music by: Sergei Grosny
- Production companies: Atresmedia Cine; Warner Bros. Pictures España; Bowfinger International Pictures; Me he hecho viral la película AIE; Pampa Films
- Distributed by: Warner Bros. Pictures España
- Release date: 11 October 2023 (Spain)
- Countries: Spain; Argentina
- Language: Spanish
- Box office: €1.1 million

Me he hecho viral is a 2023 Spanish-Argentine comedy film directed by Jorge Coira from a screenplay by Araceli Gonda which stars Blanca Suárez.

== Plot ==
On a plane, returning from holiday in Polynesia, social-media obsessed Mabel discovers her partner's infidelity whilst surreptitiously checking his mobile phone. She overreacts, passengers panic and the plane makes an emergency landing with videos recorded going viral on the internet. Upon landing in Madrid, she has become known as "the crazy plane lady", losing her job, her friends, her home and her privacy. She then struggles to get her life back.

== Cast ==
- Blanca Suárez as Mabel
- Nicolás Furtado as Javi
- Enric Auquer as Berto
- Miguel Rellán as Mabel's father
- Cristina Gallego as Penélope
- Daniel Fez as Mabel's brother
- Esperanza Guardado as Fani

== Production ==
The screenplay was written by Araceli Gonda. The film is a Spanish-Argentine co-production by Atresmedia Cine, Warner Bros. Pictures España, Bowfinger International Pictures, and Me he hecho viral la película AIE alongside Pampa Films and it had the participation of Atresmedia, Movistar Plus+, Mogambo and CreaSGR, the association of Glow, and the backing from ICAA and INCAA. Shooting locations included the Ciudad Real Airport.

== Release ==
The film was released theatrically in Spain by Warner Bros. on 11 October 2023.

== Reception ==
Javier Ocaña of Cinemanía rated the film 3½ out of 5 stars, deeming it to be one of the best Spanish commercial comedies of recent years in his verdict.

== See also ==
- List of Spanish films of 2023
