= Once and for All (film) =

- Theatrical release poster
- Spanish: A tiro limpio
- Directed by: Jesús Mora
- Screenplay by: José Ángel Esteban; Carlos López
- Based on: A tiro limpio by José María Ricarte and Francisco Pérez-Dolz
- Produced by: José Díaz de Espada; Esperanza Gallut
- Starring: Toni Cantó; Adolfo Fernández; Román Luknar; Luís Rodrigues; Laura Pamplona; Diana Peñalver; Francesc Orella; Ana Gracia
- Cinematography: Federico Ribes
- Edited by: Iván Aledo
- Music by: Kaelo del Río
- Production company: Seda
- Distributed by: Impacto Films
- Release dates: 23 September 1996 (Zinemaldia); 5 June 1998 (Spain)
- Country: Spain
- Language: Spanish

Once and for All (Spanish: A tiro limpio) is a 1996 Spanish crime thriller film directed by Jesús Mora remaking the 1963 film by Francisco Pérez-Dolz. It stars Toni Cantó and Adolfo Fernández.

== Plot ==
The plot is set in Gran Canaria. Former criminal turned fisherman Román hopes for buying a boat and spending time with his girlfriend Marisa, but old sadistic homosexual pal Martín comes across and proposes him a robbery.

== Cast ==
- Toni Cantó as Román
- Adolfo Fernández as Martín
- Roman Luknár as Picas
- Luis Rodrigues as Nino
- Diana Peñalver as Mónica
- Laura Pamplona as Marisa
- Ana Gracia as Julia
- Francesc Orella as Fito
- Daniel Martín as Felipe

== Production ==
The film is a Seda production, and it had the association of TVE and Canal+. Shooting locations in Las Palmas included the old Estadio Insular.

== Release ==
The film screened in the 'Zabaltegi' section of the 44th San Sebastián International Film Festival in September 1996. Distributed by Impacto Films, it was released theatrically in Spain on 5 June 1998.

== Reception ==
Jonathan Holland of Variety considered it to be "unusually safe and dependable for a debut feature" [...] successfully managing "to conceal the limitations of its budget and shooting schedule" "while only occasionally igniting passions".

Augusto Martínez Torres of El País declared the film one of the best Spanish policíacos of the time, finding Adolfo Fernández's overacting to be its only issue.

== See also ==
- List of Spanish films of 1998
