= Francesc Orella =

Spanish actor

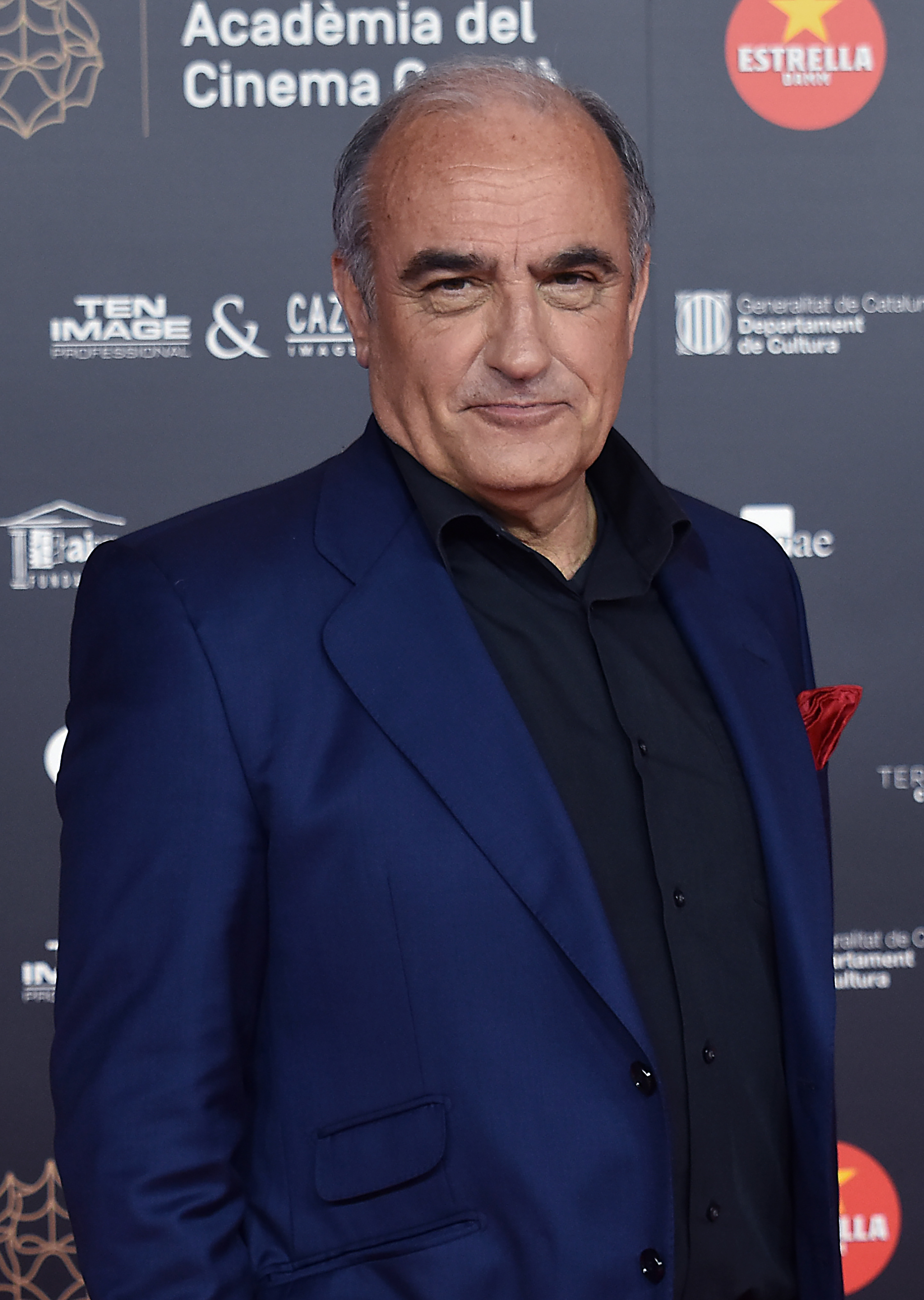
- Born: Francesc Orella i Pinell; 11 June 1957 (age 69); Barcelona, Catalonia, Spain
- Education: Institut del Teatre; Herbert Berghoff Studio
- Occupation: Actor
- Years active: 1990-today
- Known for: The interpretation of "Merlí" in the series of TVC Merlí.

Francesc Orella i Pinell (Catalan pronunciation: [fɾənˈsɛsk uˈɾɛʎə]; born 11 June 1957) is a Spanish actor of cinema, television, theater and dubbing mainly known for his title role in the series Merlí on TVC.

In 2008, Orella won a Max award for Best Actor for his role in An Enemy of the People. In June 2009, he was awarded the National Theatre performance "strong, unique, compelling, moving and flawless" in theater productions of all records.

== Biography ==
Born in Barcelona in 1957, he graduated from the Institut del Teatre in his hometown, and later moved to the United States to study at the Herbert Berghoff Studio (HB Studio) in New York City where he studied with actors such as John Strasberg, Carol Rosenfeld, Carlos Gandolfo, Genadi Karatkov and Bob McAndrew.

In the world of the cinema he made debut in several films and series produced by TV3, and in the year 2000 debuted in the Commissary of Telecinco.

He later appeared in series and mini-series as Ventdelplà (2009) or Infieles (2009), and debuted as co-star in Las veus del Pamano (2009), Ermessenda (2010) and Prim, l'assassinat del carrer del Turco (2014). In 2015 he joined the cast of the new series Carlos, Rey Emperador where he gave life to Cardinal Adrian of Utrecht.

In the middle of 2015 he got the starring role of "Merlí" in TVC's TV series Merlí, which made him famous both nationally and internationally. He plays a professor of Philosophy who encourages his students to think freely through unorthodox methods, a man who has a seductive and intense sex life.

== Personal life ==
He currently resides in Valldoreix, in the municipality of Sant Cugat del Vallès (Spain). He is single without children.

== Filmography ==
=== Cinema ===
| Year | Title | Character |
|---|---|---|
| 1983 | Asalto al Banco Central | Atracado |
| 1988 | Luces y sombras | |
| 1989 | Pont de Varsòvia | Professor |
| 1990 | Boom Boom | Ramón |
| 1990 | La teranyina | Obrer |
| 1992 | Los mares del sur | Ladillas |
| 1994 | Roig | Padre |
| 1995 | Ábreme la puerta | Juan |
| 1995 | El perquè de tot plegat | Egotista (segment "Ego") |
| 1995 | La conversió | |
| 1995 | Land and Freedom | Casado |
| 1996 | A tiro limpio | Fito |
| 1997 | La Moños | Ricardo |
| 1998 | Tan lejos, tan cerca | |
| 1998 | Subjúdice | Martí |
| 1998 | El pianista | Quintana |
| 1998 | Déjeme que le cuente | Borracho |
| 1999 | La ciudad de los prodigios | |
| 2000 | Morir | Víctima |
| 2000 | Yoyes | Hombre mechero |
| 2000 | El viaje de Arián | |
| 2001 | Mi dulce | Antonio |
| 2001 | Clara y Elena | Eddy |
| 2002 | Smoking Room | Martínez |
| 2003 | Nudos | Mario |
| 2003 | Utopía | Padre Ochoa |
| 2003 | La suerte dormida | Miguel Ángel |
| 2004 | El año del diluvio | Cabo Lastre |
| 2005 | Segundo asalto | Mendiri |
| 2005 | Disonancia | |
| 2006 | Remake | Guarda Jurado Mayor |
| 2006 | La silla | Artista |
| 2006 | Capitaine Alatriste | Capitán Bragado |
| 2008 | Shiver (Eskalofrío) | Dimas |
| 2009 | Tres dies amb la família | Toni |
| 2010 | Los ojos de Julia | Inspector Dimas |
| 2011 | Mil cretins | Brotto |
| 2011 | Silencio en la nieve | Reyes Zarauza |
| 2012 | Els nens salvatges | Àngel |
| 2014 | Stella cadente | El Bisbe |
| 2014 | Lasa y Zabala | Galindo |
| 2014 | Interior. Família. | |
| 2015 | Truman | Actor Restaurante |
| 2016 | Brava | (in production) |
| 2016 | Contratiempo | Félix Leiva |

=== Television ===
| Year | Title | Character |
|---|---|---|
| 2000 | Andorra, entre el torb i la Gestapo | |
| 2000 | El comisario | Telmo Chacón |
| 2013 | Mario Conde. Los días de gloria | Juan Abelló |
| 2014 | Prim, el asesinato de la calle del Turco | General Prim |
| 2015 | Carlos, rey emperador | Adrian VI |
| 2015 | Merlí | Merlí |
