= The Biggest Robbery Never Told =

- El robo más grande jamás contado
- Directed by: Daniel Monzón
- Screenplay by: Jorge Guerricaechevarría; Daniel Monzón
- Produced by: Andrés Vicente Gómez; Marco Gómez (associate producer); Yousaf Bokari (line producer)
- Starring: Antonio Resines; Manuel Manquiña; Javier Aller; Jimmy Barnatán; Neus Asensi; Sancho Gracia
- Cinematography: Carles Gusi
- Edited by: Iván Aledo
- Music by: Roque Baños
- Production company: Antena 3 Televisión
- Distributed by: Lolafilms
- Release dates: October 31, 2002 (Madrid, Spain)
- Running time: 114 minutes
- Country: Spain
- Language: Spanish

The Biggest Robbery Never Told (Spanish: El robo más grande jamás contado) is a 2002 Spanish comedy film directed by Daniel Monzón and written by Jorge Guerricaechevarría.

In 2003 the film was nominated for a Goya Award for the Best Special Effects.

== Plot ==
Lucas Santos, alias The Saint (Antonio Resines), is fed up with going in and out of prison. He doesn't want to go on being a small-time thief all his life. Lucía (Neus Asensi), his wife, is a singer and dancer by profession. One day, The Saint decides to plan the robbery of one of the most representative works of modern art: Pablo Picasso's Guernica from the Reina Sofía Museum.

To achieve his purpose will be aided by another three convicts: Zorba (Manuel Manquiña) a failed artist, Jacobo Yuste (Jimmy Barnatán) a hacker known as "Windows", and Pinito (Javier Aller), a dwarf burglar able to hide in a suitcase despite his claustrophobia.

== Cast ==
- Antonio Resines: Lucas Santos Santos "El Santo" (The Saint)
- Neus Asensi: Lucía de Liñán "Lucy"
- Javier Aller: Pinito
- Manuel Manquiña: Zorba "El Greco"
- Jimmy Barnatán: Jacobo Yuste "Windows"
- Rosario Pardo: Windows's mother
- Sancho Gracia: Fernando Baeza "Garganta Profunda" (Deep Throat)
- Javivi: Barajas Airport worker
- Enrique Villén: Vicente
- Coté Soler: Fernando
- Jordi Vilches: Windows's Friend
