= Blanca Suárez =

Spanish actress

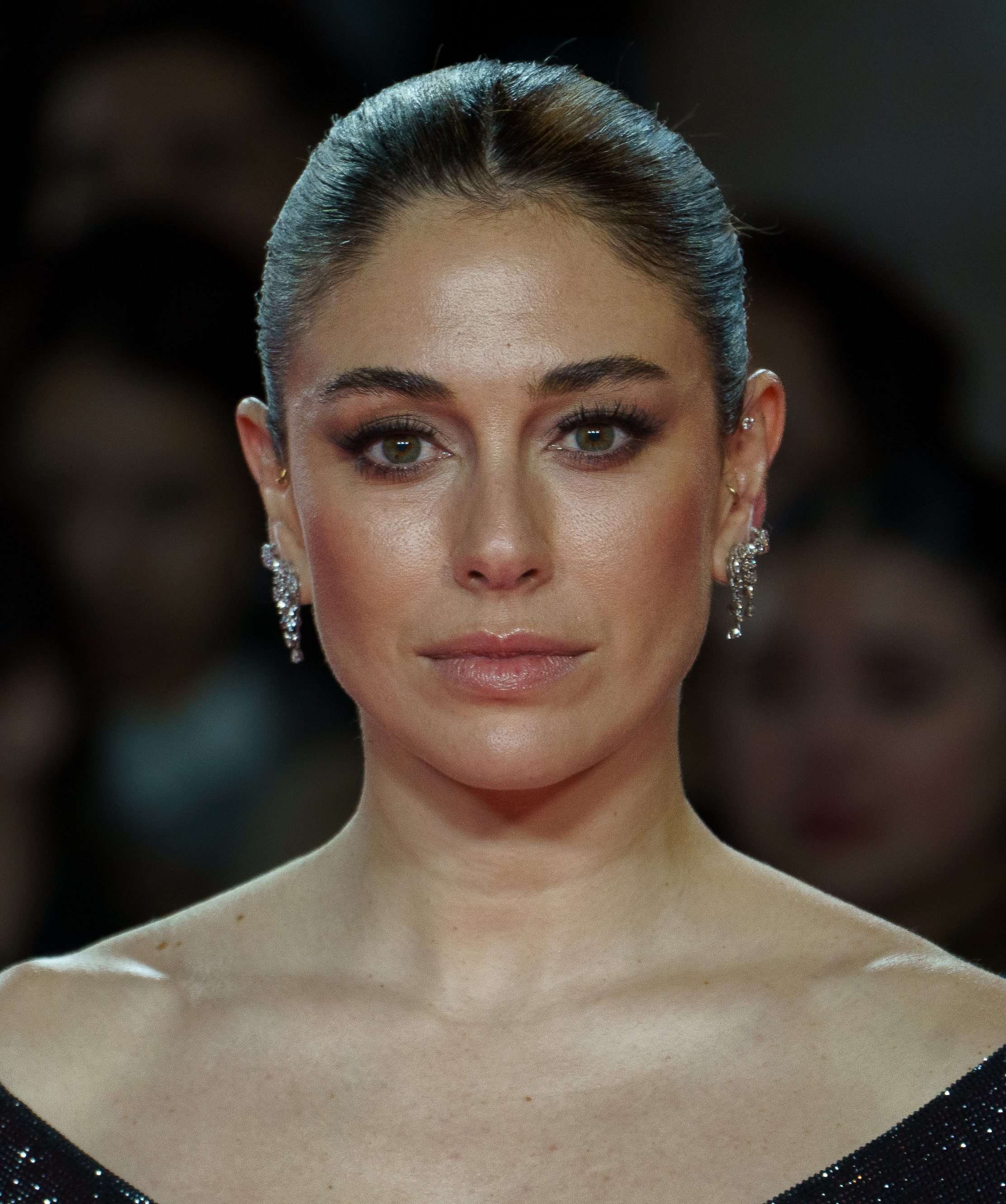
- Suárez in 2025
- Born: Blanca Martínez Suárez; 21 October 1988 (age 38); Madrid, Spain
- Education: King Juan Carlos University
- Occupation: Actress
- Years active: 2007–present

Blanca Martínez Suárez (born 21 October 1988) is a Spanish actress. She gained notoriety for her performance in Globomedia teen drama series The Boarding School (2007–10), which was followed by The Boat (2011–13). Her television work continued in series such as Carlos, Rey Emperador (2015), Lo que escondían sus ojos (2016), Cable Girls (2017–20), and Breathless (2024).

Suárez made her feature film debut in Shiver (2008). Her work in Pedro Almodóvar's The Skin I Live In (2011) earned her a nomination to Goya Award for Best New Actress. Her film work also includes performances in I'm So Excited! (2013), My Big Night (2015), The Bar (2017), Despite Everything (2019), The Summer We Lived (2020), Four's a Crowd (2022), and Me he hecho viral (2023).

== Early life ==
Blanca Suárez was born in Madrid on 21 October 1988 and is the youngest daughter of a municipal architect (father) and a banker (mother). She has a brother who is eleven years older than her.

She began studying acting at the Tritón School of Performing Arts in 1996, at the age of eight. She was a student there for thirteen years, until 2009, when she completed her last work, having already achieved popularity thanks to the television series El internado. At the beginning of her acting career, she enrolled at the King Juan Carlos University in Madrid to study Audiovisual Communication, however, she abandoned her studies to focus on her career.

== Acting career ==
=== 2007–2012: Early work and rise to prominence ===
Suárez made her acting debut in 2007, portraying the role of Julia Medina in the Antena 3 series The Boarding School. She would star in the series until its end in 2010, and earn Fotogramas de Plata Award for Best Actress for her performance, as well as a Golden Nymph for Best Actress – Drama nomination at the Monte-Carlo Television Festival in 2009. In the meantime, Suárez appeared in full-length pictures Shiver (2008; her feature film debut), Cowards (2008), Brain Drain (2009) and The Consul of Sodom (2009), as well as in the short films Universes (Universos) and Hemisphere (Hemisferio).

In 2010, Suárez had her first starring role in Neon Flesh opposite Mario Casas. The film was eventually released in 2011. Suárez then starred, along with Antonio Banderas and Elena Anaya, in Pedro Almodóvar's The Skin I Live In, for which she earned critical acclaim and a Goya Award for Best New Actress nomination. The same year, she appeared in the music video for Ladrones' song "Estoy prohibido".

Suárez then went on to star in another Antena 3 series, The Boat, for which she won Fotogramas de Plata Award for Best Television Actress and Ondas Award for Best Actress, as well as a nomination for TP de Oro Award for Best Actress. The Boat aired from 17 January 2011 to 21 February 2013. In the meantime, Suárez starred in two films that both premiered at the 2012 Málaga Film Festival — the comedy drama Winning Streak, along with Daniel Brühl, Lluís Homar and Miguel Ángel Silvestre, and Imanol Uribe's historical romance Orange Honey, alongside Iban Garate.

=== 2013–present: Established career ===
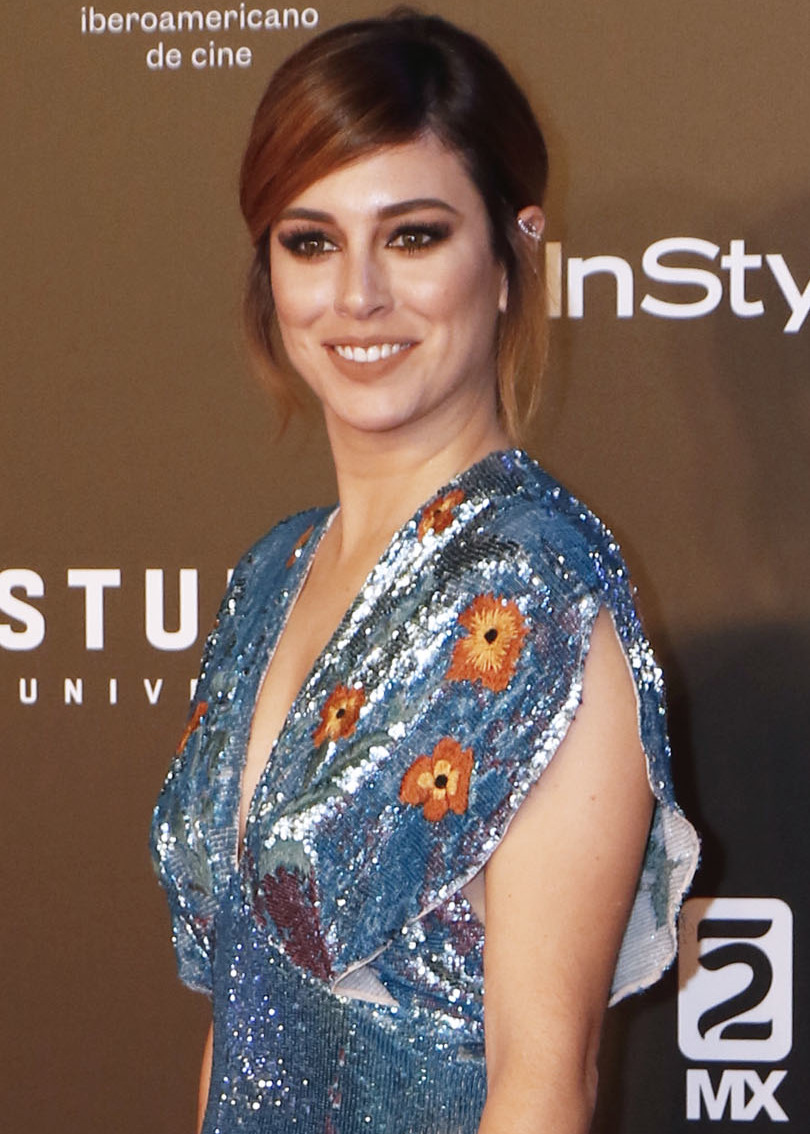
Suárez in 2017

In 2013, Suárez appeared in I'm So Excited!, an ensemble cast comedy film directed by Pedro Almodóvar. At the 2013 Cannes Film Festival, Suárez was awarded the Trophée Chopard for Female Revelation of the Year for her work in acting; the award was presented to her by Colin Firth.

In 2014, Suárez portrayed Snow White in the eponymous episode of the television series Cuéntame un cuento. In 2015, she starred in the miniseries Los nuestros opposite Hugo Silva; the television series Carlos, Rey Emperador as Isabella of Portugal; and films Off Course, opposite her The Boarding School co-star Yon González, My Big Night by Álex de la Iglesia, for which she was nominated for Best Supporting Actress at the 3rd Feroz Awards. and also Álex de la Iglesia's next film The Bar (2017).

In 2024, she was cast in the hospital-set drama Breathless for Netflix. There she plays a doctor dealing with both professional and personal concerns.

== Other work ==
Suárez appeared in music videos for "Estoy prohibido" by Ladrones in 2010 and "Emocional" by Dani Martín in 2014.

In 2013, she became a model for the Italian lingerie label Intimissimi.

Since February 2014, Suárez has been writing a blog for Vogue España.

== Media and personal life ==
Suárez was named the Most Searched For Performer on the Internet by the Fotogramas in 2011 and 2014, and was voted the best dressed celebrity at the 26th Goya Awards. In November of the same year, she was named Woman of the Year by the Spanish edition of GQ.

Suárez was in a relationship with actor Javier Pereira from 2008 to 2010. She then dated and lived with her Winning Streak co-star Miguel Ángel Silvestre from 2011 to 2014. In 2014, Suárez briefly dated Spanish pop rock musician Dani Martín. From 2015 to 2017, she was in a relationship with actor Joel Bosqued. Later, from March 2018 to October 2019, she was in a relationship with Mario Casas. For the past three years Suarez has been in a relationship with the actor Javier Rey.

== Discography ==
Singles

- 2019: Luna llena (ft. Álvaro Tessa)

== Filmography ==
=== Film ===
Key
†	Denotes films that have not yet been released

year	Title	Role	Notes	Ref.
2008	Eskalofrío (Shiver)	Ángela		
2008	Cobardes (Cowards)	Television Editor		
2009	Fuga de cerebros (Brain Drain)	Angelical voice		
2009	El cónsul de Sodoma (The Consul of Sodom)	Sandra		
2010	Carne de neón (Neon Flesh)	Verónica		
2011	La piel que habito (The Skin I Live In)	Norma Ledgard		
2012	The Pelayos (Winning Streak)	Ingrid		
2012	Miel de naranjas (Orange Honey)	Carmen		
2013	Los amantes pasajeros (I'm So Excited)	Ruth		
2015	Perdiendo el norte (Off Course)	Carla		
2015	Mi gran noche (My Big Night)	Paloma		
2016	Bakery in Brooklyn	Daniella		
2017	El bar (The Bar)	Elena		
2018	Tiempo después (Some Time Later)	Méndez		
2019	A pesar de todo (Despite Everything)	Sara		
2020	El verano que vivimos (The Summer We Lived)	Lucía		
2022	El test (The Te$t)	Berta		
2022	El cuarto pasajero (Four's a Crowd)	Lorena		
2023	Me he hecho viral	Mabel		
2024	Disco, Ibiza, Locomía	Lurdes Iríbar		
2025	La huella del mal (The Cavern Crimes)	Silvia Guzmán		
2025	Parecido a un asesinato (Hidden Murder)	Eva		
2026	En nombre de otro † (Proxies)			

=== Television ===
year	Title	Role	Notes	Ref.
2007–10	El internado (The Boarding School)	Julia Medina		
2011–13	El barco (The Boat)	Ainhoa Montero		
2014	Cuéntame un cuento	Nieves	Anthology series; 1 episode	
2014	La bella e la bestia	Bella Dubois in DalVille		
2015	Los nuestros	Isabel Santana		
2015	Carlos, rey emperador	Isabel de Portugal		
2016	Lo que escondían sus ojos	Sonsoles de Icaza		
2017–20	Las chicas del cable (Cable Girls)	Lidia Aguilar Dávila / Alba Romero Méndez		
2021	The Boarding School: Las Cumbres	Julia Medina	Cameo; 1 episode	
2021	Jaguar	Isabel Garrido		
2024–	Respira (Breathless)	Jéssica Donoso		

== Awards and nominations ==
Award	Year	Category	Nominated work	Result
Fotogramas de Plata	2010	Best Television Actress	The Boarding School	Won
Fotogramas de Plata	2011	Best Television Actress	The Boat	Won
Fotogramas de Plata	2011	Most Searched Performer on the Internet	—N/a	Won
Fotogramas de Plata	2015	Most Searched Performer on the Internet	—N/a	Won
Goya Awards	2011	Best New Actress	The Skin I Live In	Nominated
Neox Fan Awards	2012	Best Film Actress	Winning Streak	Won
Neox Fan Awards	2013	Best Television Actress	The Boat	Nominated
Neox Fan Awards	2013	Most Attractive Couple (with Miguel Ángel Silvestre)	—N/a	Nominated
Ondas Awards	2011	Best Actress	The Boat	Won
Feroz Awards	2015	Best Supporting Actress	My Big Night	Nominated
TP de Oro Awards	2011	Best Actress	The Boat	Nominated
Trophée Chopard	2013	Female Revelation of the Year	—N/a	Won
