= Toni Cantó =

Spanish actor and politician

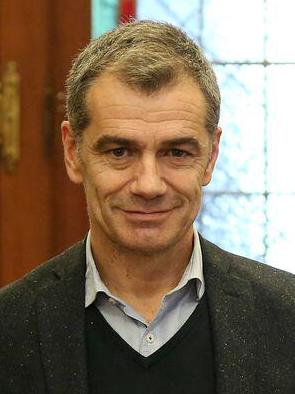

Member of the Corts Valencianes
- In office 16 May 2019 – 15 March 2021
- Constituency: Valencia

Member of the Congress of Deputies
- In office 13 January 2016 – 5 March 2019
- Constituency: Valencia
- In office 13 December 2011 – 7 April 2015
- Constituency: Valencia

Personal details
- Born: Antonio Cantó García del Moral; 14 January 1965 (age 61) Valencia, Spain
- Party: Citizens (2006–2007, 2015–2021); Vecinos por Torrelodones (2007–2008); Union, Progress and Democracy (2008–2015); People's Party (2021–2022)
- Children: 3

Antonio Cantó García del Moral (born 14 January 1965) is a Spanish actor and former politician who was Citizens deputy and spokesman, representing Valencia Province in the Congress of Deputies from 2011 to April 2015 and again from December 2015 until 2021.

== Biography ==
=== Early life ===
Antonio Cantó García del Moral was born on 14 January 1965 in Valencia, son to a physician. He worked as a model. He received training in drama at the Centro Dramático Nacional and, in 1986, he landed a job as TV presenter in La 1 show La tarde.

=== Acting career and other appearances ===
His debut in a feature film came with a performance in Carlos Romero Marchent's Oficio de muchachos, released in 1986. Some of his credits included performances in films such as Pilar Miró's Your Name Poisons My Dreams (1996), Jesús Mora's Once and for All (1996), and Pedro Almodóvar's All About My Mother (1999). A performer in a number of television series in the 1990s (including El destino en sus manos, Entre naranjos and Querido maestro), the breakthrough role bringing him widespread public recognition in Spain was his performance as David Pérez in the sitcom 7 vidas.

Cantó came third on the first season of Mask Singer: Adivina quién canta in December 2020.

On 8 September 2022 Cantó assumed the position of creative director at the television channel 7NN, which stopped broadcasting on 31 March 2023 due to insufficient income to cover operating expenses.

=== Spell in politics ===
Cantó joined Ciudadanos in 2006 and ran as a candidate for the local list Vecinos por Torrelodones in the 2007 municipal elections. He later joined Union Progress and Democracy (UPyD) in 2008.

In 2011, Cantó was selected to head the UPyD list in Valencia Province for the 2011 general election, where he gained a seat. In 2014, he was selected as UPyD candidate for President of the Valencian Government in the 2015 regional elections. He resigned his seat in Congress in April 2015 and announced that he would also not be standing for president in the Valencian regional elections. In his resignation announcement he stated that he would consider whether to remain in UPyD after the party's congress in June 2015.

Cantó had been one of the UPyD figures most critical of the leadership of Rosa Díez. Following poor local and regional election results, Díez resigned and Cantó supported Irene Lozano in the subsequent leadership election on 12 July 2015, in which Lozano lost to Andrés Herzog. 4 days later, Cantó announced that he would sit as an independent and would seek the number two position on the Citizens' list for the 2015 Spanish general election. He was chosen as the second candidate and was elected to Congress in the 2015 election.

He ran as Cs' candidate for the 2019 Valencian regional election, and was elected to the Corts Valencianes, becoming the leader of his parliamentary group and one of the most conspicuous legislators. Some of his speeches went viral. He hired a cyberactivist and adherent of the so-called alt-right as aid, who helped him to nurture further popularity. Following an ephemeral rapprochement with the Valencian government majority during the early stages of the COVID-19 pandemic, Cantó returned to an all-out style of opposition, going further than Vox and the PP in some stances.

Following the announcement of the motion of no confidence in the PP regional government in Murcia in March 2021 (and ensuing crisis in Cs as party regional legislators who had initially backed the motion crossed the floor within hours to accept government posts offered by the PP), PP's Secretary General Teodoro García Egea contacted Cantó. Cs' leader Inés Arrimadas proposed including Cantó in the executive board of Cs, yet Cantó announced he was leaving the party and his seat on 15 March 2021.

9 days later, on 24 March 2021, PP announced Cantó would be on their list for the 2021 Madrilenian regional election. However, Cantó was registered in the Valencian Community (so he could run as a candidate in the Valencian regional election) and the electoral body is set by the national electoral law (LOREG) at two months before elections are called, so doubts were cast about Cantó's passive suffrage availability, as it requires active suffrage. He claimed he had registered in the Madrid region "some days ago". In April 2021, the Administrative Court number 5 of Madrid resolved that Cantó, along with fellow intended candidate Agustín Conde, was "ineligible" for the PP list due to not having registered in the Madrid region in due time and form.

In 2021, Cantó joined the Madrid-based ISSEP, a far-right educational centre founded in Spain by Marion Maréchal, to lecture on speaking skills.
