= 2019 Valencian regional election =

Election in the Spanish region of the Valencian Community

- 28 April 2019

All 99 seats in the Corts Valencianes 50 seats needed for a majority
- Opinion polls
- Registered: 3,659,514 ▲1.4%
- Turnout: 2,697,934 (73.7%) ▲4.1 pp
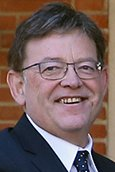

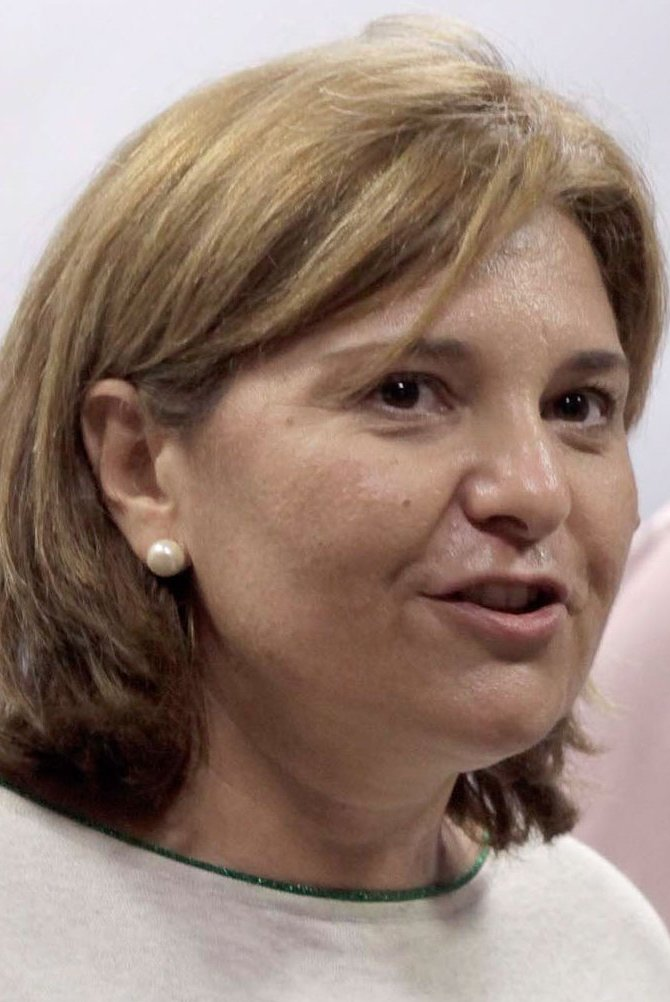

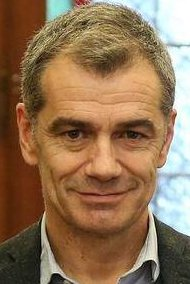

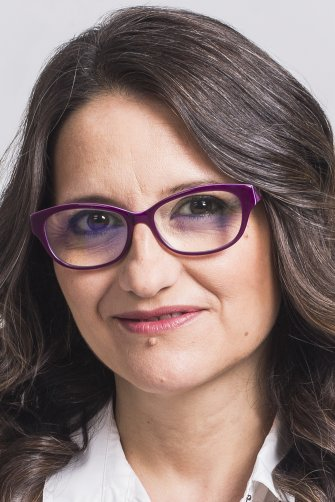

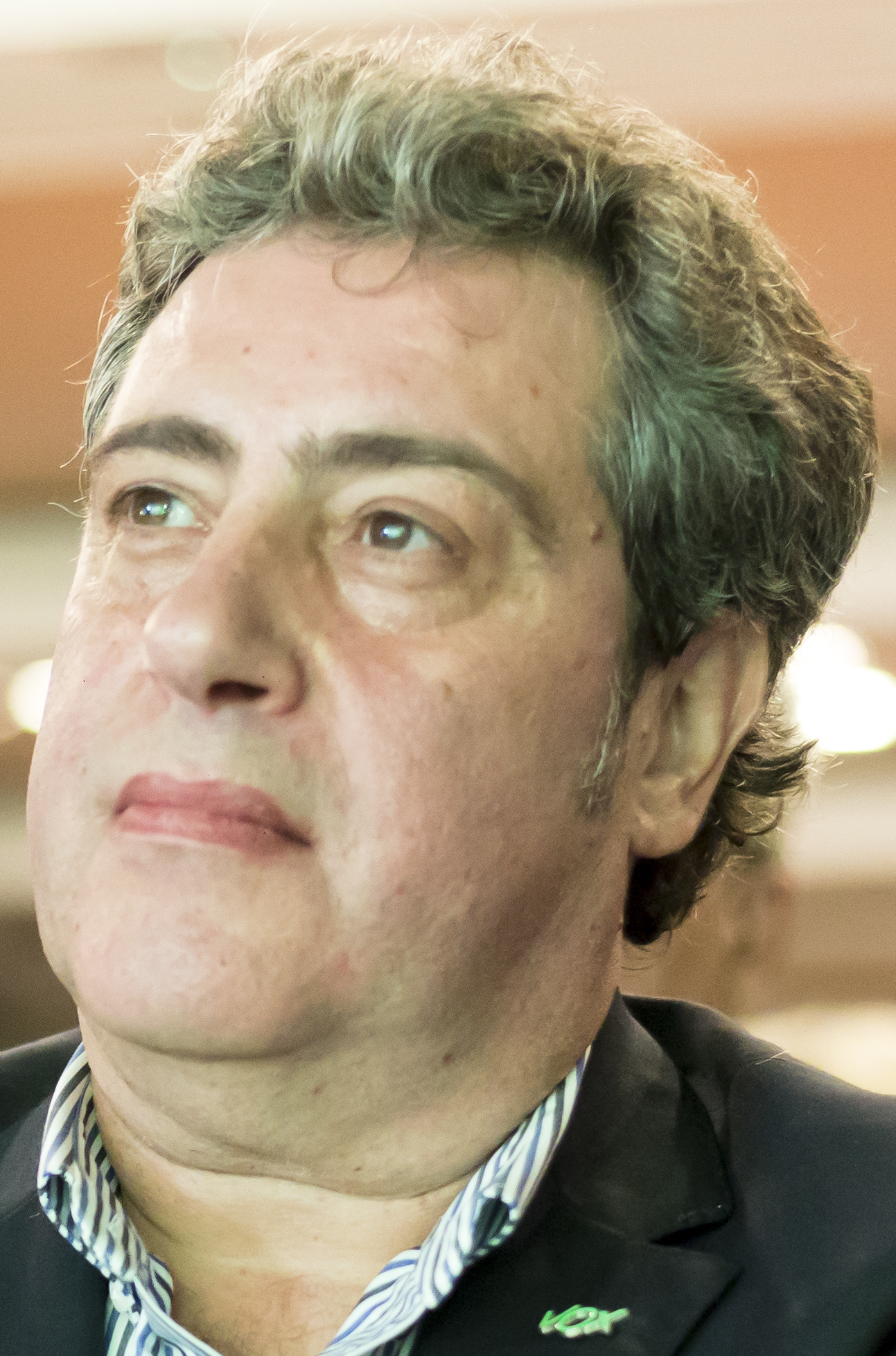

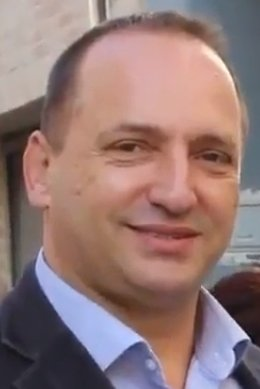
| | First party | Second party | Third party |
|---|---|---|---|
| Leader | Ximo Puig | Isabel Bonig | Toni Cantó |
| Party | PSPV–PSOE | PP | Cs |
| Leader since | 31 March 2012 | 28 July 2015 | 2 March 2019 |
| Leader's seat | Castellón | Valencia | Valencia |
| Last election | 23 seats, 20.6% | 31 seats, 26.6% | 13 seats, 12.5% |
| Seats won | 27 | 19 | 18 |
| Seat change | ▲4 | ▼12 | ▲5 |
| Popular vote | 643,909 | 508,534 | 470,676 |
| Percentage | 24.2% | 19.1% | 17.7% |
| Swing | ▲3.6 pp | ▼7.5 pp | ▲5.2 pp |
| | Fourth party | Fifth party | Sixth party |
| Leader | Mónica Oltra | José María Llanos | Rubén Martínez Dalmau |
| Party | Compromís | Vox | Unides Podem–EUPV |
| Leader since | 31 January 2015 | 26 March 2019 | 27 November 2018 |
| Leader's seat | Valencia | Valencia | Alicante |
| Last election | 19 seats, 18.5% | 0 seats, 0.4% | 13 seats, 15.7% (Note: Results for Podemos (11.4%, 13 seats) and EUPV–EV–ERPV–AS (4.3%, 0 seats) in the 2015 election.) |
| Seats won | 17 | 10 | 8 |
| Seat change | ▼2 | ▲10 | ▼5 |
| Popular vote | 443,640 | 281,608 | 215,392 |
| Percentage | 16.7% | 10.6% | 8.1% |
| Swing | ▼1.8 pp | ▲10.2 pp | ▼7.6 pp |
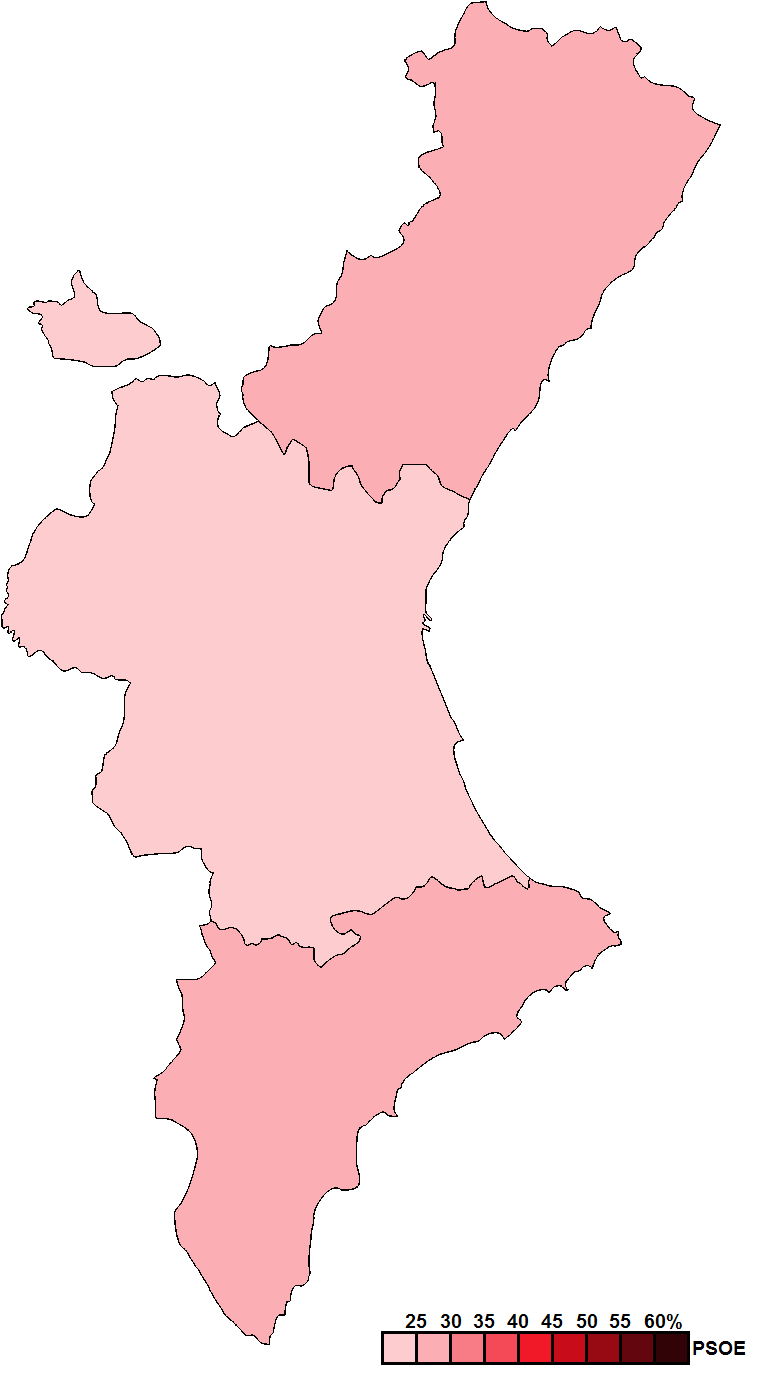
President before election
Ximo Puig
PSPV–PSOE
President after election
Ximo Puig
PSPV–PSOE

A regional election was held in the Valencian Community on 28 April 2019 to elect the 10th Corts of the autonomous community. All 99 seats in the Corts were up for election. It was held concurrently with the April 2019 Spanish general election. This was the first early regional election ever held in the Valencian Community, as well as the first Valencian election to not be held concurrently with any other regional election.

The Socialist Party of the Valencian Country (PSPV) and Coalició Compromís formed a minority coalition government in 2015, relying on confidence and supply support from Podemos, an arrangement which was dubbed the "Botànic Agreement" and forced the governing People's Party (PP) into opposition after dominating Valencian politics during the previous 20 years. The political landscape experienced some changes during the next four years, with the PP losing support to the emerging liberal Citizens (Cs) party and the right-wing populist Vox, while on the left, United Left of the Valencian Country (EUPV) formed an electoral alliance with Podemos called Unides Podem.

The election resulted in a reduced majority for the left-wing parties. The PSPV emerged as the largest party for the first time since 1991, whereas the PP suffered the worst result in its history. Cs and Vox benefited from the PP's losses, the latter entering the Corts for the first time. Compromís and Unides Podem had disappointing finishes, losing seats and ending up in fourth and sixth place, respectively. These results led to a continuation of the 2015 Botànic Agreement, though this time Podemos and EUPV joined the government as full coalition partners.

== Background ==
The 2015 regional election had resulted in the People's Party's (PP) expulsion from the regional government after a 20-year uninterrupted rule. Amid a string of corruption scandals that kept shocking the party and brought down many of its historical figureheads apparently involved in the scandals, the regional PP found itself leaderless and in a precarious situation.

'Operation Taula', a major police operation in Valencia that took place on 26 January 2016, resulted in the arrest of several former and current high-ranking members from the regional PP branch, as a consequence of the ongoing investigation on the PP's corruption in the region during its time in government. Judicial investigation also pointed to former long-time Mayor of Valencia Rita Barberá as a participant in the scandal; her arrest or imputation only being prevented by the fact she had legal protection as an incumbent senator. A few days later, on 1 February, all PP city councillors in the city of Valencia were charged for a possible money laundering offense, including new local party leader Alfonso Novo, as well as most members of Barberá's late government.

== Overview ==
Under the 1982 Statute of Autonomy, the Corts Valencianes were the unicameral legislature of the Valencian Community, having legislative power in devolved matters, as well as the ability to grant or withdraw confidence from a regional president. The electoral and procedural rules were supplemented by national law provisions.

=== Date ===
The term of the Corts Valencianes expired four years after the date of their previous election, unless they were dissolved earlier. The election decree was required to be issued no later than 25 days before the scheduled expiration date of parliament and published on the following day in the Official Journal of the Valencian Government (DOGV), with election day taking place 54 days after the decree's publication. The previous election was held on 24 May 2015, which meant that the chamber's term would have expired on 24 May 2019. The election decree was required to be published in the DOGV no later than 30 April 2019, setting the latest possible date for election day on 23 June 2019.

The regional president had the prerogative to dissolve the Corts Valencianes at any given time and call a snap election, provided that no motion of no confidence was in process. In the event of an investiture process failing to elect a regional president within a two-month period from the first ballot, the Corts were to be automatically dissolved and a fresh election called.

The Corts Valencianes were officially dissolved on 5 March 2019 with the publication of the corresponding decree in the DOGV, setting election day for 28 April and scheduling for the chamber to reconvene on 16 May.

=== Electoral system ===
Voting for the Corts was based on universal suffrage, comprising all Spanish nationals over 18 years of age, registered in the Valencian Community and with full political rights, provided that they had not been deprived of the right to vote by a final sentence. (Note: Legal amendments in 2018 granted the right to vote to those legally incapacitated.) Additionally, non-resident citizens were required to apply for voting, a system known as "begged" voting (Spanish: Voto rogado).

The Corts Valencianes had a minimum of 99 seats, with the electoral law fixing its size at that number. All were elected in three multi-member constituencies—corresponding to the provinces of Alicante, Castellón and Valencia, each of which was assigned an initial minimum of 20 seats and the remaining 39 distributed in proportion to population (with the seat-to-population ratio in any given province not exceeding three times that of any other)—using the D'Hondt method and closed-list proportional voting, with a five percent-threshold of valid votes (including blank ballots) regionally.

As a result of the aforementioned allocation, each Corts constituency was entitled the following seats:

| Seats | Constituencies |
|---|---|
| 40 | Valencia |
| 35 | Alicante |
| 24 | Castellón |

The law did not provide for by-elections to fill vacant seats; instead, any vacancies arising after the proclamation of candidates and during the legislative term were filled by the next candidates on the party lists or, when required, by designated substitutes.

=== Outgoing parliament ===
The table below shows the composition of the parliamentary groups in the chamber at the time of dissolution.

Parliamentary composition in March 2019
| Groups | Parties | Legislators | |
| Groups | Parties | Seats | Total |
|---|---|---|---|
| People's Parliamentary Group | PP | 30 | 30 |
| Socialist Parliamentary Group | PSPV–PSOE | 23 | 23 |
| Commitment Parliamentary Group | Compromís | 19 | 19 |
| We Can Parliamentary Group | Podemos | 12 | 12 |
| Citizens Parliamentary Group | Cs | 9 | 9 |
| Non-Inscrits | Agermanats | 4 (Note: Alexis Marí, David de Miguel, Alberto García Salvador and Roberto Rojo, former Cs legislators.) | 6 |
| Non-Inscrits | INDEP | 2 (Note: Miquel Domínguez, former PP legislator; Covadonga Peremarch, former Podemos legislator.) | 6 |

== Parties and candidates ==
The electoral law allowed for parties and federations registered in the interior ministry, alliances and groupings of electors to present lists of candidates. Parties and federations intending to form an alliance were required to inform the relevant electoral commission within 10 days of the election call, whereas groupings of electors needed to secure the signature of at least one percent of the electorate in the constituencies for which they sought election, disallowing electors from signing for more than one list. Additionally, a balanced composition of men and women was required in the electoral lists, so that candidates of either sex made up at least 40 percent of the total composition.

Below is a list of the main parties and alliances which contested the election:

| Candidacy | Parties and alliances | Leading candidate | Ideology | Previous result | | Gov. | Ref. |
| Candidacy | Parties and alliances | Leading candidate | Ideology | Vote % | Seats | Gov. | Ref. |
|---|---|---|---|---|---|---|---|
| PP | List: People's Party (PP) | Isabel Bonig | Conservatism; Christian democracy | 26.6% | 31 | No | |
| PSPV–PSOE | List: Socialist Party of the Valencian Country (PSPV–PSOE) | Ximo Puig | Social democracy | 20.6% | 23 | Yes | |
| Compromís | List: Valencian Nationalist Bloc (Bloc); Valencian People's Initiative (IdPV); Greens Equo of the Valencian Country (VerdsEquo) | Mónica Oltra | Valencianism; Progressivism; Green politics | 18.5% | 19 | Yes | |
| Unides; Podem–EUPV | List: We Can (Podemos/Podem); United Left of the Valencian Country (EUPV) – Communist Party of the Valencian Country (PCPV) – The Dawn Marxist Organization (La Aurora (OM)) – Republican Left (IR) – Feminist Party of Spain (PFE) | Rubén Martínez Dalmau | Left-wing populism Direct democracy Democratic socialism | 15.7% | 13 | No | |
| Cs | List: Citizens–Party of the Citizenry (Cs) | Toni Cantó | Liberalism | 12.5% | 13 | No | |
| Vox | List: Vox (Vox) | José María Llanos | Right-wing populism Ultranationalism; National conservatism | 0.4% | 0 | No | |

== Campaign ==
=== Party slogans ===
| Party or alliance | Original slogan | English translation | Ref. |
|---|---|---|---|
| PP | « Correctamente política » | "Politics correctly" | |
| PSPV–PSOE | « Seguir sumando » « Seguir sumant » | "Keep adding" | |
| Compromís | « Imparables » | "Unstoppable" | |
| Cs | « ¡Vamos Ciudadanos! » | "Let's go Citizens!" | |
| Unides Podem–EUPV | « La historia la escribes tú » | "History is written by you" | |
| Vox | « Valencia por España » | "Valencia for Spain" | |

=== Debates ===
2019 Valencian regional election debates
| Date | Organizer(s) | Moderator(s) | P Present (Note: Denotes a main invitee attending the event.) S Surrogate (Note: Denotes a main invitee not attending the event, sending a surrogate in their place.) NI Not invited A Absent invitee | | | | | | | |
| Date | Organizer(s) | Moderator(s) | PP | PSPV | Compr. | Cs | UPodemos | Vox | Audience | Ref. |
|---|---|---|---|---|---|---|---|---|---|---|
| 12 April | Cadena SER | Bernardo Guzmán | P Bonig | P Puig | P Oltra | P Cantó | P Dalmau | NI | — | |
| 17 April | RTVE | Inma Canet | P Bonig | P Puig | P Oltra | P Cantó | P Dalmau | NI | 11.5% (213,000) | |
| 25 April | À Punt | Jessica Crespo | P Bonig | P Puig | P Oltra | P Cantó | P Dalmau | NI | 4.1% (75,000) | |

== Opinion polls ==
The tables below list opinion polling results in reverse chronological order, showing the most recent first and using the dates when the survey fieldwork was done, as opposed to the date of publication. Where the fieldwork dates are unknown, the date of publication is given instead. The highest percentage figure in each polling survey is displayed with its background shaded in the leading party's colour. If a tie ensues, this is applied to the figures with the highest percentages. The "Lead" column on the right shows the percentage-point difference between the parties with the highest percentages in a poll.

=== Voting intention estimates ===
The table below lists weighted voting intention estimates. Refusals are generally excluded from the party vote percentages, while question wording and the treatment of "don't know" responses and those not intending to vote may vary between polling organisations. When available, seat projections determined by the polling organisations are displayed below (or in place of) the percentages in a smaller font; 50 seats were required for an absolute majority in the Corts Valencianes.

Color key:

Poll conducted after legal ban on opinion polls

| Polling firm/Commissioner | Fieldwork date | Sample size | Turnout | PP | PSPV | Compromís | Cs | Podemos/Podem | EUPV | Vox | Unidas Podemos | Lead |
|---|---|---|---|---|---|---|---|---|---|---|---|---|
| 2019 regional election | 28 Apr 2019 | —N/a | 73.7 | 19.1; 19 | 24.2; 27 | 16.7; 17 | 17.7; 18 | (Note: Within Unides Podem–EUPV.) | | 10.6; 10 | 8.1; 8 | 5.1 |
| SyM Consulting/Valencia Plaza | 26–28 Apr 2019 | ? | ? | 18.8; 20 | 24.9; 24/27 | 20.5; 20/22 | 7.6; 7/8 | | | 14.5; 15 | 9.1; 10 | 4.4 |
| IMOP/COPE | 25–27 Apr 2019 | 4,760 | ? | 15.5; 16 | 23.0; 24/26 | 23.5; 23/24 | 16.5; 17/18 | | | 8.0; 7/8 | 9.6; 8/10 | 0.5 |
| ElectoPanel/Electomanía | 24–25 Apr 2019 | ? | ? | 22.5; 24 | 25.2; 28 | 16.2; 15 | 13.4; 14 | | | 11.4; 10 | 8.6; 8 | 2.7 |
| ElectoPanel/Electomanía | 23–24 Apr 2019 | ? | ? | 22.6; 24 | 25.8; 29 | 16.3; 15 | 13.3; 13 | | | 11.5; 10 | 8.1; 8 | 3.2 |
| ElectoPanel/Electomanía | 22–23 Apr 2019 | ? | ? | 22.1; 24 | 26.8; 29 | 16.3; 15 | 13.1; 13 | | | 11.5; 10 | 7.5; 8 | 4.7 |
| ElectoPanel/Electomanía | 21–22 Apr 2019 | ? | ? | 22.3; 24 | 27.1; 29 | 16.7; 15 | 12.6; 13 | | | 11.6; 10 | 7.4; 8 | 4.8 |
| ElectoPanel/Electomanía | 20–21 Apr 2019 | ? | ? | 22.2; 24 | 27.0; 29 | 16.3; 15 | 12.7; 13 | | | 11.5; 10 | 7.3; 8 | 4.8 |
| KeyData/Público | 20 Apr 2019 | ? | 65.9 | 22.1; 24 | 26.9; 32 | 15.2; 14 | 14.6; 15 | | | 8.0; 6 | 7.4; 8 | 4.8 |
| ElectoPanel/Electomanía | 19–20 Apr 2019 | ? | ? | 22.1; 23 | 26.8; 29 | 16.2; 15 | 12.4; 13 | | | 11.9; 11 | 7.5; 8 | 4.7 |
| IMOP/El Confidencial | 14–20 Apr 2019 | 552 | ? | 17.6; 19 | 26.5; 30 | 16.4; 16 | 12.0; 13 | | | 10.0; 9 | 11.5; 12 | 8.9 |
| ElectoPanel/Electomanía | 18–19 Apr 2019 | ? | ? | 22.5; 23 | 26.9; 29 | 15.8; 15 | 12.4; 13 | | | 11.8; 11 | 7.5; 8 | 4.4 |
| ElectoPanel/Electomanía | 17–18 Apr 2019 | ? | ? | 22.5; 24 | 26.9; 29 | 15.8; 15 | 12.4; 13 | | | 11.8; 10 | 7.5; 8 | 4.4 |
| ElectoPanel/Electomanía | 16–17 Apr 2019 | ? | ? | 22.6; 24 | 27.0; 29 | 16.0; 15 | 12.7; 13 | | | 11.5; 10 | 7.6; 8 | 4.4 |
| GAD3/Las Provincias | 11–17 Apr 2019 | ? | ? | 24.3; 25/27 | 30.2; 33/34 | 15.9; 14/15 | 12.8; 12/13 | | | 7.1; 7/8 | 6.1; 5 | 5.9 |
| ElectoPanel/Electomanía | 15–16 Apr 2019 | ? | ? | 23.0; 24 | 27.4; 29 | 15.4; 15 | 13.2; 13 | | | 10.9; 10 | 7.4; 8 | 4.4 |
| ElectoPanel/Electomanía | 14–15 Apr 2019 | ? | ? | 22.9; 24 | 27.4; 29 | 15.3; 15 | 13.3; 13 | | | 11.0; 10 | 7.3; 8 | 4.5 |
| Sigma Dos/El Mundo | 10–15 Apr 2019 | 1,200 | ? | 20.8; 22/23 | 27.3; 29/30 | 17.6; 17/18 | 13.8; 13/14 | | | 9.9; 9/11 | 7.3; 6 | 6.5 |
| ElectoPanel/Electomanía | 13–14 Apr 2019 | ? | ? | 22.8; 25 | 27.3; 31 | 14.5; 14 | 13.7; 14 | | | 11.2; 10 | 6.9; 5 | 4.5 |
| IMOP/El Confidencial | 17 Mar–14 Apr 2019 | 617 | 67.0 | 20.5; 20 | 26.6; 30 | 19.1; 19 | 13.7; 14 | | | 7.0; 8 | 8.8; 8 | 6.1 |
| SyM Consulting/Valencia Plaza | 11–12 Apr 2019 | 1,414 | ? | 18.6; 21 | 25.9; 25/27 | 23.2; 22/24 | 7.4; 6/8 | | | 14.4; 14 | 7.6; 8 | 2.7 |
| NC Report/EPDA | 4–9 Apr 2019 | 900 | 67.3 | 25.0; 27 | 26.4; 30 | 14.7; 13 | 15.8; 16 | | | 5.3; 5 | 7.8; 8 | 1.4 |
| ElectoPanel/Electomanía | 4–7 Apr 2019 | ? | ? | 22.4; 25 | 26.5; 30 | 14.7; 15 | 13.1; 13 | | | 11.5; 11 | 6.5; 5 | 4.1 |
| 40dB/El País | 2–5 Apr 2019 | 1,200 | ? | 18.8; 19/20 | 28.1; 31 | 18.4; 18/20 | 13.7; 12/15 | | | 8.6; 8 | 8.7; 8/9 | 9.3 |
| Invest Group/Prensa Ibérica | 25 Mar–5 Apr 2019 | 1,600 | ? | 23.7; 25 | 31.6; 33 | 14.1; 14 | 16.9; 17 | | | 6.1; 5 | 5.7; 5 | 7.9 |
| Celeste-Tel/eldiario.es | 31 Mar–4 Apr 2019 | 900 | 67.9 | 23.2; 26 | 26.8; 29 | 15.5; 15 | 14.4; 15 | | | 7.7; 7 | 8.1; 7 | 3.6 |
| GAD3/Las Provincias | 31 Mar 2019 | ? | ? | 22.4; 24 | 28.8; 33 | 14.4; 13/14 | 14.6; 15 | | | 7.1; 7/8 | 6.7; 5/7 | 6.4 |
| ElectoPanel/Electomanía | 24–31 Mar 2019 | ? | ? | 22.2; 25 | 26.3; 30 | 14.6; 14 | 13.7; 14 | | | 11.7; 11 | 6.4; 5 | 4.1 |
| ElectoPanel/Electomanía | 17–24 Mar 2019 | ? | ? | 22.2; 25 | 26.8; 30 | 15.1; 15 | 12.9; 13 | | | 12.0; 11 | 5.9; 5 | 4.6 |
| CIS | 15–24 Mar 2019 | 1,373 | 71.2 | 15.4; 18/19 | 30.9; 33/36 | 16.9; 17/18 | 16.0; 16/19 | | | 6.5; 5/6 | 8.3; 7/8 | 14.0 |
| ElectoPanel/Electomanía | 10–17 Mar 2019 | ? | ? | 22.2; 25 | 25.6; 29 | 15.4; 15 | 11.8; 11 | | | 14.3; 14 | 5.7; 5 | 3.4 |
| ElectoPanel/Electomanía | 3–10 Mar 2019 | ? | ? | 21.8; 22 | 25.5; 29 | 15.5; 15 | 12.2; 13 | | | 14.4; 15 | 5.7; 5 | 3.7 |
| NC Report/La Razón | 5–9 Mar 2019 | 1,000 | ? | 23.6; 27 | 23.9; 27 | 14.3; 15 | 15.6; 16 | | | 9.8; 8 | 8.2; 6 | 0.3 |
| ElectoPanel/Electomanía | 22 Feb–3 Mar 2019 | ? | ? | 22.3; 22 | 24.7; 26 | 16.6; 15 | 12.7; 13 | | | 15.1; 18 | 5.9; 5 | 2.4 |
| SyM Consulting/Valencia Plaza | 22–24 Jan 2019 | 1,545 | ? | 21.1; 23/24 | 20.7; 23 | 19.9; 19/20 | 12.8; 12/15 | 6.3; 5 | 2.2; 0 | 13.2; 14/15 | – | 0.4 |
| La Razón | 16 Jan 2019 | ? | ? | 16.0; 17 | 22.5; 26 | 19.0; 19 | 14.0; 16 | 7.0; 7 | – | 13.5; 14 | – | 3.5 |
| GfK/Compromís | 11 Jan 2019 | 1,300 | ? | 14.0– 15.0 | 21.0– 24.0 | 20.0– 21.0 | 20.0– 23.0 | 6.0– 6.5 | 5.0– 7.0 | 6.5– 7.0 | – | 1.0 |
| Invest Group/Prensa Ibérica | 21–28 Sep 2018 | 900 | ? | 21.5; 22 | 30.0; 33 | 17.5; 18 | 18.2; 19 | | | – | 7.9; 7 | 8.5 |
| PSPV | 20 Sep 2018 | ? | ? | 24.0 | 26.0 | 20.0 | 14.0 | 7.0 | – | – | – | 2.0 |
| SyM Consulting/Valencia Plaza | 1–3 Sep 2018 | 1,492 | 63 | 18.8; 20/21 | 33.5; 35/37 | 22.0; 22/23 | 10.7; 10/11 | 10.0; 9/10 | – | – | – | 11.5 |
| GfK/Compromís | 2 May 2018 | 1,303 | ? | 16.0– 18.0 | 17.0– 19.0 | 25.0– 27.0 | 24.0– 26.0 | 5.0– 7.0 | 5.0– 7.0 | – | – | 1.0 |
| Sigma Dos/Las Provincias | 23–25 Apr 2018 | 1,200 | ? | 22.0; 24/26 | 23.1; 25/26 | 16.4; 16/17 | 22.2; 23/25 | 8.7; 8 | 1.9; 0 | – | – | 0.9 |
| SyM Consulting/Valencia Plaza | 9–12 Apr 2018 | 1,465 | ? | 23.5; 25/27 | 20.6; 20/23 | 21.4; 22 | 15.3; 16 | 8.8; 8/9 | 6.9; 5 | – | – | 2.1 |
| MyWord/Podemos | 8–18 Jan 2018 | 1,200 | ? | ? 23/24 | ? 24/26 | ? 17/18 | ? 20/23 | ? 11/12 | – | – | – | ? |
| Invest Group/Prensa Ibérica | 25–28 Sep 2017 | 750 | ? | 29.3; 30 | 26.2; 26 | 17.0; 17 | 13.4; 13 | 6.9; 7 | 5.9; 6 | – | – | 3.1 |
| SyM Consulting/Valencia Plaza | 31 Aug–2 Sep 2017 | 1,404 | ? | 26.7; 29/30 | 19.7; 21/23 | 20.8; 21 | 14.2; 15 | 11.4; 11/12 | 3.9; 0 | – | – | 5.9 |
| Invest Group/Prensa Ibérica | 6 May 2017 | ? | ? | 33.4; 37 | 25.4; 28 | 17.3; 18 | 7.3; 8 | 7.8; 8 | 4.9; 0 | – | – | 8.0 |
| Sigma Dos/Las Provincias | 24–28 Apr 2017 | 1,200 | ? | 28.6; 32/33 | 23.0; 25/27 | 14.1; 14 | 11.5; 11/13 | 14.4; 14/15 | 2.4; 0 | – | – | 5.6 |
| GfK/Compromís | 25 Apr 2017 | 1,255 | ? | 25.0– 27.0 | 16.0– 18.0 | 25.0– 27.0 | 14.0– 16.0 | 9.0– 11.0 | 4.0– 6.0 | – | – | Tie |
| Invest Group/Prensa Ibérica | 20–27 Sep 2016 | 750 | ? | 38.3; 41 | 24.0; 25 | 15.6; 16 | 7.6; 8 | 8.7; 9 | 3.3; 0 | – | – | 14.3 |
| 2016 general election | 26 Jun 2016 | —N/a | 72.4 | 35.4 (37) | 20.8 (21) | (Note: Within Compromís–Podemos–EUPV.) | 15.0 (15) | | | 0.2 (0) | 25.4 (26) | 10.0 |
| Invest Group/Prensa Ibérica | 31 May–7 Jun 2016 | 750 | ? | 25.8; 27 | 22.3; 23 | 22.7; 23 | 13.3; 13 | 9.9; 9 | 5.3; 4 | – | – | 3.1 |
| 2015 general election | 20 Dec 2015 | —N/a | 74.8 | 31.3 (34) | 19.8 (22) | (Note: Within Compromís–Podemos.) | 15.8 (17) | | 4.2 (0) | 0.3 (0) | 25.1 (26) | 6.2 |
| Invest Group/Prensa Ibérica | 28 Sep–2 Oct 2015 | 1,100 | ? | 25.7; 27 | 24.6; 26 | 19.6; 21 | 16.1; 17 | 7.5; 8 | 3.1; 0 | – | – | 1.1 |
| 2015 regional election | 24 May 2015 | —N/a | 69.6 | 26.6; 31 | 20.6; 23 | 18.4; 19 | 12.5; 13 | 11.4; 13 | 4.3; 0 | 0.4; 0 | – | 6.0 |

=== Voting preferences ===
The table below lists raw, unweighted voting preferences.

| Polling firm/Commissioner | Fieldwork date | Sample size | PP | PSPV | Compromís | Cs | Podemos/Podem | EUPV | Vox | Unidas Podemos | Question | X mark | Lead |
|---|---|---|---|---|---|---|---|---|---|---|---|---|---|
| 2019 regional election (Note: Does not include non-resident citizens.) | 28 Apr 2019 | —N/a | 14.3 | 18.1 | 12.5 | 13.2 | | | 7.9 | 6.0 | —N/a | 24.2 | 3.8 |
| 40dB/El País | 2–5 Apr 2019 | 1,200 | 11.0 | 16.5 | 13.2 | 7.6 | | | 5.3 | 4.9 | 31.4 | 5.5 | 3.3 |
| CIS | 15–24 Mar 2019 | 1,373 | 8.2 | 18.1 | 7.3 | 5.9 | | | 4.3 | 3.5 | 41.5 | 8.1 | 9.9 |
| Invest Group/Prensa Ibérica | 20–27 Sep 2016 | 750 | 20.2 | 13.5 | 8.4 | – | – | – | – | – | – | 29.6 | 6.7 |
| 2016 general election | 26 Jun 2016 | —N/a | 26.1 | 15.3 | | 11.0 | | | 0.2 | 18.6 | —N/a | 25.9 | 7.5 |
| Invest Group/Prensa Ibérica | 31 May–7 Jun 2016 | 750 | 17.5 | 14.9 | 16.3 | – | – | – | – | – | – | 17.1 | 1.2 |
| 2015 general election | 20 Dec 2015 | —N/a | 23.8 | 15.1 | | 12.0 | | 3.2 | 0.2 | 19.1 | —N/a | 23.4 | 4.7 |
| Invest Group/Prensa Ibérica | 28 Sep–2 Oct 2015 | 1,100 | 15.9 | 15.2 | 13.0 | 9.9 | 5.0 | 2.1 | – | – | – | – | 0.7 |
| 2015 regional election | 24 May 2015 | —N/a | 18.7 | 14.4 | 12.9 | 8.8 | 8.0 | 3.0 | 0.3 | – | —N/a | 28.9 | 4.3 |

=== Victory preferences ===
The table below lists opinion polling on the victory preferences for each party in the event of a general election taking place.

| Polling firm/Commissioner | Fieldwork date | Sample size | PP | PSPV | Compromís | Cs | Vox | Unidas Podemos | Other/ None | Question | Lead |
|---|---|---|---|---|---|---|---|---|---|---|---|
| Invest Group/Prensa Ibérica | 25 Mar–5 Apr 2019 | 1,600 | 17.7 | 25.7 | 9.2 | 12.0 | 3.8 | 2.9 | – | 25.1 | 8.0 |
| CIS | 15–24 Mar 2019 | 1,373 | 11.8 | 27.2 | 10.2 | 10.4 | 4.3 | 4.4 | 8.7 | 23.0 | 15.4 |

=== Victory likelihood ===
The table below lists opinion polling on the perceived likelihood of victory for each party in the event of a regional election taking place.

| Polling firm/Commissioner | Fieldwork date | Sample size | PP | PSPV | Compromís | Cs | Vox | Unidas Podemos | Other/ None | Question | Lead |
|---|---|---|---|---|---|---|---|---|---|---|---|
| Invest Group/Prensa Ibérica | 25 Mar–5 Apr 2019 | 1,600 | 21.4 | 36.6 | 7.4 | 2.6 | 1.3 | 0.3 | – | 25.9 | 15.2 |
| CIS | 15–24 Mar 2019 | 1,373 | 26.7 | 31.3 | 3.3 | 3.4 | 1.1 | 0.3 | 1.1 | 32.8 | 4.6 |

=== Preferred President ===
The table below lists opinion polling on leader preferences to become president of the Valencian Government.

| Polling firm/Commissioner | Fieldwork date | Sample size | | | | | | | | Other/ None/ Not care | Question | Lead |
| Polling firm/Commissioner | Fieldwork date | Sample size | Bonig PP | Puig PSPV | Oltra Compromís | Punset Cs | Cantó Cs | Montiel Podemos | Dalmau UP | Other/ None/ Not care | Question | Lead |
|---|---|---|---|---|---|---|---|---|---|---|---|---|
| CIS | 15–24 Mar 2019 | 1,373 | 8.2 | 22.8 | 15.6 | – | 6.7 | – | 1.4 | 16.6 | 28.6 | 7.2 |
| SyM Consulting/Valencia Plaza | 1–3 Sep 2018 | 1,492 | 16.8 | 14.3 | 40.8 | – | 7.1 | – | – | – | 21.0 | 24.0 |
| GfK/Compromís | 2 May 2018 | 1,303 | 7.0 | 21.0 | 34.2 | – | 13.0 | – | – | 24.8 | | 13.2 |
| GfK/Compromís | 25 Apr 2017 | 1,255 | 8.9 | 21.5 | 33.9 | 1.1 | – | 2.1 | – | 32.5 | | 12.4 |

== Results ==
=== Overall ===
← Summary of the 28 April 2019 Corts Valencianes election results →
| Parties and alliances | Popular vote | | | Seats | |
| Parties and alliances | Votes | % | ±pp | Total | +/− |
|---|---|---|---|---|---|
| Socialist Party of the Valencian Country (PSPV–PSOE) | 643,909 | 24.21 | +3.64 | 27 | +4 |
| People's Party (PP) | 508,534 | 19.12 | −7.49 | 19 | −12 |
| Citizens–Party of the Citizenry (Cs) | 470,676 | 17.70 | +5.21 | 18 | +5 |
| Commitment: Bloc–Initiative–Greens Equo (Compromís) | 443,640 | 16.68 | −1.78 | 17 | −2 |
| Vox (Vox) | 281,608 | 10.59 | +10.17 | 10 | +10 |
| United We Can–United Left (Unides Podem–EUPV)^{1} | 215,392 | 8.10 | −7.63 | 8 | −5 |
| Animalist Party Against Mistreatment of Animals (PACMA) | 38,447 | 1.45 | +0.65 | 0 | ±0 |
| Forward–The Eco-pacifist Greens (Avant/Adelante–LVEP) | 8,604 | 0.32 | +0.27 | 0 | ±0 |
| We Are Valencian in Movement (UiG–Som–CUIDES) | 7,102 | 0.27 | −0.01 | 0 | ±0 |
| Republican Left of the Valencian Country (ERPV) | 5,069 | 0.19 | New | 0 | ±0 |
| Communist Party of the Peoples of Spain (PCPE) | 4,509 | 0.17 | +0.05 | 0 | ±0 |
| Democratic People (Poble) | 2,931 | 0.11 | +0.02 | 0 | ±0 |
| Valencian Republic–European Valencianist Party (RV–PVE) | 2,108 | 0.08 | New | 0 | ±0 |
| Seniors in Action (3e en acción) | 1,869 | 0.07 | New | 0 | ±0 |
| Spanish Phalanx of the CNSO (FE–JONS) | 1,307 | 0.05 | −0.09 | 0 | ±0 |
| Act (PACT) | 1,230 | 0.05 | New | 0 | ±0 |
| At Once Valencian Community (aUna CV) | 981 | 0.04 | New | 0 | ±0 |
| Republican Alternative (ALTER) | 620 | 0.02 | New | 0 | ±0 |
| Blank ballots | 20,221 | 0.76 | −0.62 | | |
| Total | 2,659,709 | | | 99 | ±0 |
| Valid votes | 2,659,709 | 98.58 | −0.02 | | |
| Invalid votes | 38,225 | 1.42 | +0.02 | | |
| Votes cast / turnout | 2,697,934 | 73.72 | +4.16 | | |
| Abstentions | 961,580 | 26.28 | −4.16 | | |
| Registered voters | 3,659,514 | | | | |
Sources
Footnotes: ^{1} United We Can–United Left results are compared to the combined totals of We Can and Citizen Agreement in the 2015 election.

Popular vote
| PSPV–PSOE | 24.21% |
| PP | 19.12% |
| Cs | 17.70% |
| Compromís | 16.68% |
| Vox | 10.59% |
| U. Podem–EUPV | 8.10% |
| PACMA | 1.45% |
| Others | 1.40% |
| Blank ballots | 0.76% |

Seats
| PSPV–PSOE | 27.27% |
| PP | 19.19% |
| Cs | 18.18% |
| Compromís | 17.17% |
| Vox | 10.10% |
| U. Podem–EUPV | 8.08% |

=== Distribution by constituency ===
| Constituency | PSPV | | PP | | Cs | | Compr. | | Vox | | UP–EUPV | |
| Constituency | % | S | % | S | % | S | % | S | % | S | % | S |
|---|---|---|---|---|---|---|---|---|---|---|---|---|
| Alicante | 25.6 | 10 | 20.1 | 7 | 19.1 | 7 | 11.0 | 4 | 11.3 | 4 | 9.3 | 3 |
| Castellón | 27.6 | 7 | 21.5 | 5 | 15.1 | 4 | 14.4 | 4 | 10.5 | 2 | 7.8 | 2 |
| Valencia | 22.6 | 10 | 18.0 | 7 | 17.3 | 7 | 20.7 | 9 | 10.2 | 4 | 7.4 | 3 |
| Total | 24.2 | 27 | 19.1 | 19 | 17.7 | 18 | 16.7 | 17 | 10.6 | 10 | 8.1 | 8 |

== Aftermath ==
=== Government formation ===
Investiture; Nomination of Ximo Puig (PSPV)
| Ballot → | 13 June 2019 |
| Required majority → | 50 out of 99 |
| Yes: • PSPV (27); • Compromís (17); • Unides Podem–EUPV (8) | 52 / 99 |
| No: • PP (19); • Cs (17); • Vox (10) | 46 / 99 |
| Abstentions | 0 / 99 |
| Absentees: • Cs (1) | 1 / 99 |

== Bibliography ==
- Ley 5/1983, de 30 de diciembre, del Consell (Law 5/1983). Official State Gazette (in Spanish). 30 December 1983 [version as of 23 March 2007]. BOE-A-1984-3460.
- Ley Orgánica 5/1985, de 19 de junio, del Régimen Electoral General (Organic Law 5/1985). Official State Gazette (in Spanish). 19 June 1985 [version as of 6 March 2019]. BOE-A-1985-11672.
- Ley 1/1987, de 31 de marzo, Electoral Valenciana (Law 1/1987). Official State Gazette (in Spanish). 31 March 1987 [version as of 6 April 1987]. BOE-A-1987-9636.
- Ley Orgánica 1/2006, de 10 de abril, de Reforma de la Ley Orgánica 5/1982, de 1 de julio, de Estatuto de Autonomía de la Comunidad Valenciana (Organic Law 1/2006). Official State Gazette (in Spanish). 10 April 2006 [version as of 13 March 2019]. BOE-A-1982-17235.
- Decreto 2/2019, de 4 de marzo, del president de la Generalitat, de disolución de Les Corts y de convocatoria de elecciones a las mismas (PDF) (Decree 2/2019). Official Journal of the Valencian Government (in Spanish). 4 March 2019.
