= Women in the Park =

- Theatrical release poster
- Spanish: Mujeres en el parque
- Directed by: Felipe Vega
- Screenplay by: Manuel Hidalgo; Felipe Vega
- Produced by: Gerardo Herrero
- Starring: Adolfo Fernández; Blanca Apilánez; Bárbara Lennie; Emma Vilarasau; Alberto Ferreiro
- Cinematography: Alfonso Parra
- Edited by: Ángel Hernández Zoido
- Production company: Tornasol Films
- Distributed by: Alta Classics
- Release dates: 21 October 2006 (Seminci); 12 January 2007 (Spain)
- Country: Spain
- Language: Spanish

Women in the Park (Spanish: Mujeres en el parque) is a 2006 Spanish drama film directed by Felipe Vega. It stars Adolfo Fernández, Blanca Apilánez, Bárbara Lennie, Emma Vilarasau, and Alberto Ferreiro.

== Plot ==
Set in Madrid, the plot features the relationship of a father (Daniel, a music teacher and pianist recently separated from Ana, now dating Clara) with his job hunting daughter Mónica, dating David.

== Cast ==
- Adolfo Fernández as Daniel
- Bárbara Lennie as Mónica
- Blanca Apilánez as Ana
- Alberto Ferreiro as David
- Emma Vilarasau as Clara

== Production ==
The film is a Tornasol Films production, and it had the participation of TVE.

== Release ==
The film was presented at the 51st Valladolid International Film Festival (Seminci) in October 2006. It was released theatrically in Spain on 12 January 2007.

== Reception ==
Jonathan Holland of Variety deemed the film to be "as precise as a laser beam but sans the heat".

Esteve Riambau of Fotogramas rated the film 3 out of 5 stars, highlighting Lennie's performance as the best thing about the film, while negatively citing an overly forced final twist.

== See also ==
- List of Spanish films of 2007
