= Shiver (2008 film) =

- Theatrical release poster
- Spanish: Eskalofrío
- Directed by: Isidro Ortiz
- Written by: Hernán Migoya; José Gamo; Alejandro Fernández; Isidro Ortiz
- Produced by: Ramón Vidal; Álvaro Augustin
- Starring: Junio Valverde; Blanca Suárez; Jimmy Barnatán; Mar Sodupe; Francesc Orella
- Cinematography: Josep M. Civit
- Edited by: Bernat Aragonés
- Music by: Fernando Velázquez
- Production companies: Fausto Producciones; Telecinco Cinema; Apuntolapospo; Televisió de Catalunya
- Distributed by: Cine Video y TV
- Release dates: 8 February 2008 (Berlinale); 18 July 2008 (Spain)
- Running time: 91 minutes
- Country: Spain
- Language: Spanish

Shiver (Spanish: Eskalofrío) is a 2008 Spanish horror-thriller film directed by Isidro Ortiz. It stars Junio Valverde, Blanca Suárez, Jimmy Barnatán, Mar Sodupe, and Francesc Orella.

== Cast ==
- Junio Valverde as Santi
- Blanca Suárez as Ángela
- Jimmy Barnatán as Leo
- Mar Sodupe as Julia
- Francesc Orella as Dimas

== Production ==
The film is a Fausto Producciones, Telecinco Cinema, Apuntolapospo, and Televisió de Catalunya production. It was shot in locations of Picos de Europa (Asturias) as well as in Aragon.

== Release ==
The film was set to have its premiere in the 'Panorama' section of the 58th Berlin International Film Festival on 8 February 2008. It was released theatrically in Spain on 18 July 2008.

== Reception ==
Derek Elley of Variety found the film to be "a something-nasty-in-the-forest horror movie that ends up as standard genre fare, light on shocks".

The Movie Spot gave the film much praise saying "Great Spanish horror movie. Creepy and unnerving. Junio Valverde who plays Santi was great. Highly recommend it."

== See also ==
- List of Spanish films of 2008
