= Adolfo Fernández (actor) =

Spanish actor (1958–2025)

Adolfo Fernandez
- Born: 25 May 1958; Seville, Spain
- Died: 12 December 2025 (aged 67); Perales de Tajuña, Spain
- Occupation: Actor
- Years active: 1996–2025

Adolfo Fernández (25 May 1958 – 12 December 2025) was a Spanish actor.

== Life and career ==
Adolfo Fernández was born in Seville on 25 May 1958. He spent his childhood in Muskiz, Biscay. He made his big screen debut in 1996 in A tiro limpio. During his career, he featured in films such as Women in the Park Talk to Her, Mataharis, Between Your Legs, All Is Silence, and Women in the Park and series such as Águila Roja, B&b, Alpha Males, and Amar es para siempre.

Fernández died on 12 December 2025, at the age of 67.
