= Daniel Monzón =

Spanish screenwriter and director

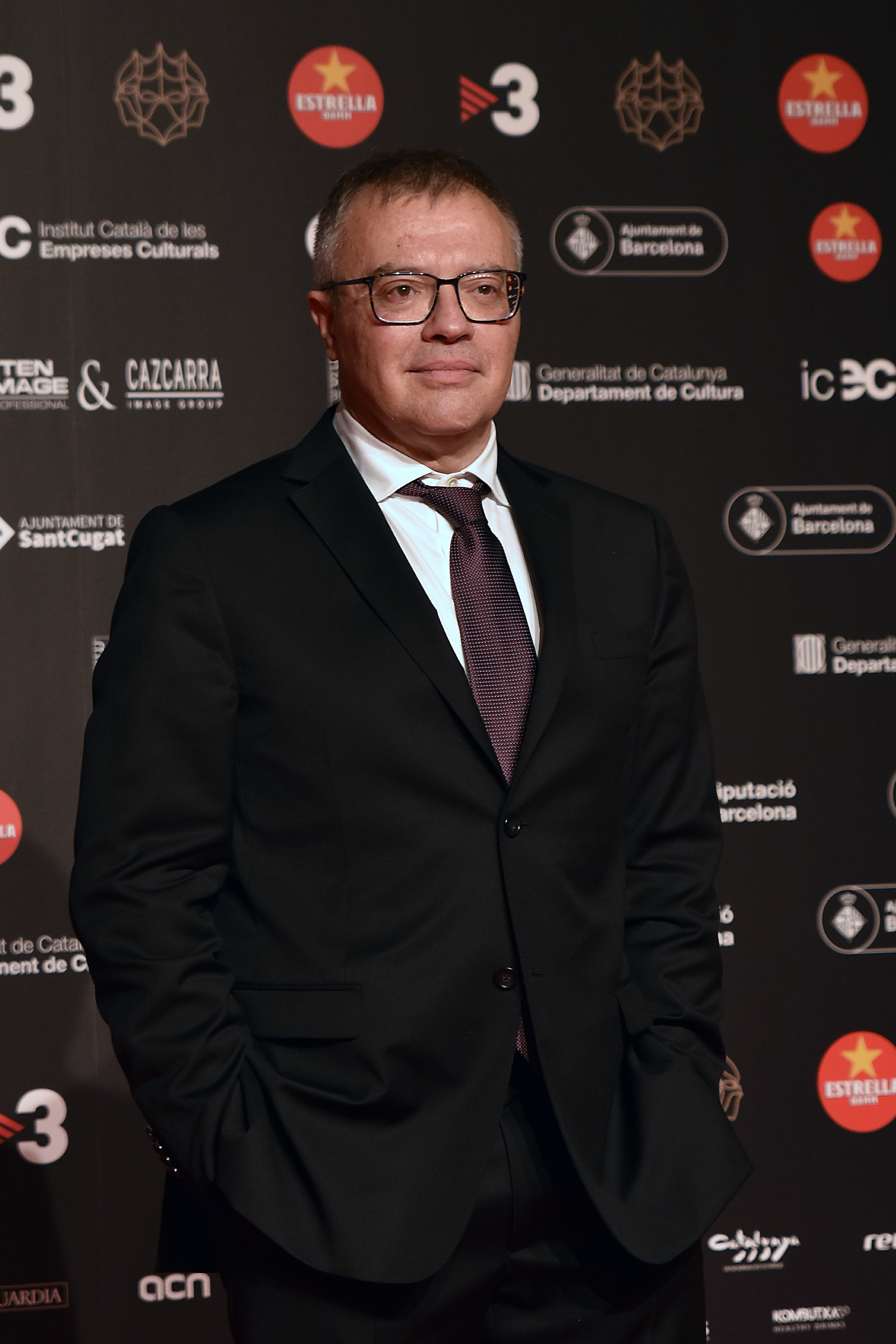
Monzón attending the 14th Gaudí Awards in 2022

Daniel Monzón Jerez (born 1968) is a Spanish screenwriter and director.

== Biography ==
He was born in Palma, Majorca in 1968. He started as a film critic, collaborating with the magazine Fotogramas. He also featured alongside José Luis Guarner as reviewer in the TVE's film show Días de cine. After taking part in the writing of the 1994 film Shortcut to Paradise, he made his debut as feature film director with the film Heart of the Warrior.

He has since directed films such as Celda 211, El Niño, The Kovak Box, Yucatán, and Outlaws.

== Filmography ==
Year	Title	Director	Writer
1994	Shortcut to Paradise	No	Yes
2000	Heart of the Warrior	Yes	Yes
2002	The Biggest Robbery Never Told	Yes	Yes
2006	The Kovak Box	Yes	Yes
2009	Cell 211	Yes	Yes
2014	El Niño	Yes	Yes
2018	Yucatán	Yes	Yes
2021	Outlaws	Yes	Yes
TBA	Ruega por nosotras	Yes	Yes

== Awards and nominations ==
Year	Award	Category	Work	Result	Ref.
2001	15th Goya Awards	Best New Director	The Heart of the Warrior	Nominated	
2010	24th Goya Awards	Best Director	Cell 211	Won	
2010	24th Goya Awards	Best Adapted Screenplay (nominated alongside Jorge Guerricaechevarría)	Cell 211	Won	
2015	29th Goya Awards	Best Director	El niño	Nominated	
2015	29th Goya Awards	Best Original Screenplay (nominated alongside Jorge Guerricaechevarría)	El niño	Nominated	
2022	36th Goya Awards	Best Adapted Screenplay (nominated alongside Jorgue Guerricaechevarría)	Outlaws	Won	
