= Javier Aller =

Spanish actor (1972–2018)

- Born: Francisco Javier Aller Martín; 20 April 1972; Madrid
- Died: 1 May 2018 (aged 46); Madrid
- Occupation: Actor
- Years active: 1998–2013

Javier Aller Martín (20 April 1972 – 1 May 2018) was a Spanish film and television actor. Born in Madrid, his career began on 1998, and he participated in various humoristic film and TV series, known by his short stature.

He participated in films such as The Biggest Robbery Never Told, Miguel y William, Mortadelo & Filemon: The Big Adventure, The Miracle of P. Tinto, His Majesty Minor.

He died on 1 May 2018 from diabetes after suffering from two strokes.
