= Mingo Ràfols i Olea =

Catalan actor

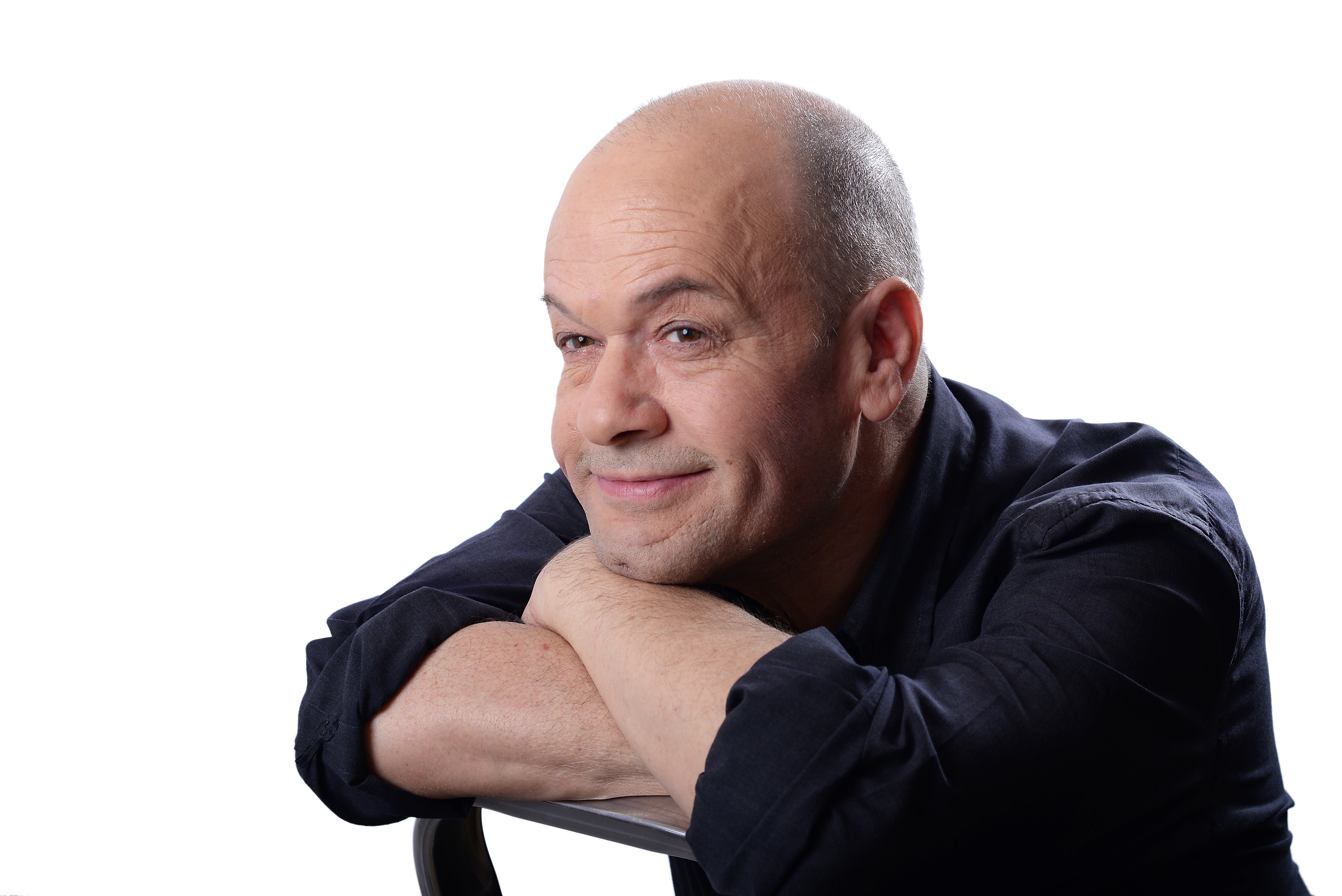

Mingo Ràfols i Olea (born 1956 in Barcelona) is a Catalan theatre, movie, and television actor.

His professional debut was in 1976 with Faixes, turbans i barretines, by Xavier Fàbregas. He has taken part in numerous theater performances, among others, Bertolt Brecht's, Òpera de tres rals (1984), William Shakespeare's, The Merry Wives of Windsor (1994), Henrik Ibsen's, Ghosts (2008) or Jordi Faura's work, Hikikomori (2009).

He has worked in several theater companies, such as Teatre Lliure (1981–82), "Companyia Josep Maria Flotats" (1990) or "Companyia Teatre Romea" (2001–2010), where he has acted, among others, in William Shakespeare's, King Lear (2004), Tirant lo Blanc (2007), or Àngel Guimerà's Terra Baixa (2009).

He has also worked in cinema movies: Què t'hi jugues, Mari Pili?(1990), Aquesta nit o mai (1992), Morir (o no) (1999), Un cos al bosc (1996) or Krámpack (2000), and has collaborated in television series and programs.

== Awards ==
- Special Award for Interpretation of the Theater Critics of Barcelona 1996–97 for Maria Rosa
- Prize for the best theater actor of the AADPC 1995 for El Rei Joan
- Special Interpretation Award of the Theater Critics of Barcelona 1995–96 for El Rei Joan
- Special Performance Award of the Theater Critics of Barcelona 1992–93 for La nit just abans dels boscos
- AADPC Theater Performance Award 1993 for La nit just abans dels boscos
- Nominated as best actor by the AADPC in Bones Festes
- Nominated for the Armchair Awards for Coronel Ocell
- Nominated for the Silver Frames for Macbeth and the Butaca Awards for Orfeu als inferns

== Films ==
- Yo, el Vaquilla, (1985), Dir: José Antonio de la Loma
- Bar-cel-ona, (1987), Dir: Ferran Llagostera
- Barrios altos, (1987), Dir: José Luis García Berlanga
- Què t'hi jugues, Mari Pili?, (1991), Dir: Ventura Pons
- Aquesta nit o mai, (1992), Dir: Ventura Pons
- Gimlet, (1995), Dir: José Luis Acosta
- Un cos al bosc, (1996), Dir: Joaquim Jordà
- Morir (o no), (2000), Dir: Ventura Pons
- Krámpack, (2000), Dir: Cesc Gay
- Menja d'amor, Dir: Ventura Pons
- Noche de fiesta, (2002), Dir: Xavi Puebla
- Mil cretins, (2011), Dir: Ventura Pons
- Barcelona, nit d'estiu, (2013), Dir: Dani de la Orden
- Darrera la porta, (2015), Dir: David Gimbernat i Pere Solés
- Sabates grosses, (2017), Dir: Ventura Pons

== Television ==
- Las aventuras de Pepe Carbalho, (1986)
- Makinavaja, (1995)
- Estació d'enllaç, (1995)
- Nissaga de poder, (1996–1998)
- Cròniques de la veritat oculta, (1997)
- Hermanas, (1998)
- Homenots, (1999)
- Nissaga: l'herència, (1999–2000)
- El comisario, (2004)
- La princesa del polígon, (2007) (telefilm)
- Cuéntame cómo pasó, (2007–2009)
- El cor de la ciutat, (2008–2009)
- Acusados, (2010)
- Clara Campoamor, la dona oblidada, (2011) (telefilm)
- Homicidios, (2011)
- Carta a Eva, (2012)
- Kubala, Moreno i Manchón, (2014)
- El cas dels catalans, (2014) (telefilm)
- Carlos, rey emperador, (2015)
- Vida privada, (2017)
