= Results of the 2015 Spanish Congress election =

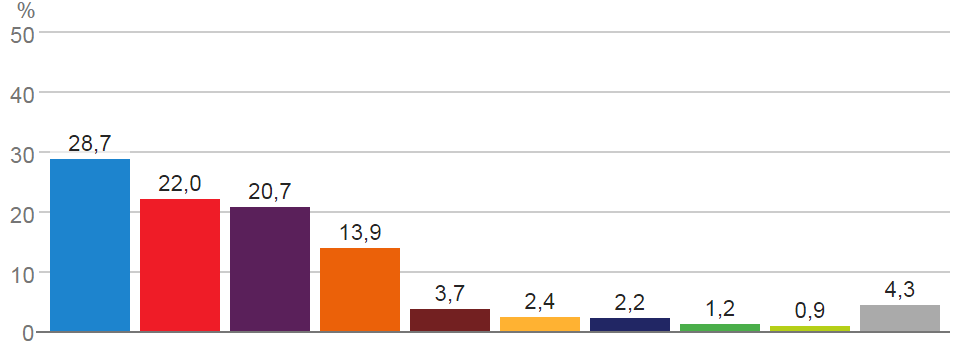
(Spain)	Main: 2015 Spanish general election
← 2011 20 December 2015 2016 →
Party		Votes	%	Seats
	PP	7,236,965	28.7%	123
	PSOE	5,545,315	22.0%	90
	Podemos	5,212,711	20.7%	69
	C's	3,514,528	13.9%	40
	IU–UPeC	926,783	3.7%	2
	ERC–CatSí	604,285	2.4%	9
	DiL	567,253	2.2%	8
	EAJ/PNV	302,316	1.2%	6
	EH Bildu	219,125	0.9%	2
	Others	1,082,032	4.3%	1
Total		25,211,313	100.0%	350

This article presents the results breakdown of the election to the Congress of Deputies held in Spain on 20 December 2015. The following tables show detailed results in each of the country's 17 autonomous communities and in the autonomous cities of Ceuta and Melilla, as well as a summary of constituency and regional results.

== Nationwide ==
← Summary of the 20 December 2015 Congress of Deputies election results →
Parties and alliances	Popular vote			Seats	
Parties and alliances	Votes	%	±pp	Total	+/−
People's Party (PP)^{1}	7,236,965	28.71	−16.33	123	−64
Spanish Socialist Workers' Party (PSOE)	5,545,315	22.00	−6.76	90	−20
We Can–In Common–Commitment–In Tide (Podemos)	5,212,711	20.68	New	69	+65
We Can (Podemos)^{2}	3,198,584	12.69	New	42	+42
In Common We Can (En Comú)^{3}	929,880	3.69	+2.54	12	+9
It is Time (Podemos–Compromís)^{4}	673,549	2.67	+2.16	9	+8
In Tide (Podemos–Anova–EU)^{5}	410,698	1.63	+1.31	6	+6
Citizens–Party of the Citizenry (C's)	3,514,528	13.94	New	40	+40
United Left–Popular Unity in Common (IU–UPeC)^{6}	926,783	3.68	−1.81	2	−6
Republican Left of Catalonia–Catalonia Yes (ERC–CatSí)	604,285	2.40	+1.34	9	+6
Republican Left of Catalonia–Catalonia Yes (ERC–CatSí)	601,782	2.39	+1.36	9	+6
Valencian Country Now (Ara PV)^{7}	2,503	0.01	−0.02	0	±0
Democracy and Freedom (DiL)^{8}	567,253	2.25	−1.92	8	−8
Basque Nationalist Party (EAJ/PNV)	302,316	1.20	−0.13	6	+1
Animalist Party Against Mistreatment of Animals (PACMA)	220,369	0.87	+0.45	0	±0
Basque Country Gather (EH Bildu)^{9}	219,125	0.87	−0.50	2	−5
Union, Progress and Democracy (UPyD)	155,153	0.62	−4.08	0	−5
Canarian Coalition–Canarian Nationalist Party (CCa–PNC)^{10}	81,917	0.32	−0.27	1	−1
We–Galician Candidacy (Nós)^{11}	70,863	0.28	−0.48	0	−2
Democratic Union of Catalonia (unio.cat)	65,388	0.26	New	0	±0
Vox (Vox)	58,114	0.23	New	0	±0
Zero Cuts–Green Group (Recortes Cero–GV)	48,675	0.19	New	0	±0
More for the Balearic Islands (Més)^{12}	33,877	0.13	±0.00	0	±0
Communist Party of the Peoples of Spain (PCPE)	31,179	0.12	+0.01	0	±0
Yes to the Future (GBai)	30,642	0.12	−0.05	0	−1
El Pi–Proposal for the Isles (El Pi)	12,910	0.05	New	0	±0
Citizens of Democratic Centre (CCD)	10,827	0.04	+0.04	0	±0
Blank Seats (EB)	10,084	0.04	−0.36	0	±0
Spanish Phalanx of the CNSO (FE de las JONS)	7,495	0.03	+0.02	0	±0
For the Left–The Greens (X Izda)	7,314	0.03	New	0	±0
We Are Valencian (SOMVAL)	6,103	0.02	New	0	±0
For a Fairer World (PUM+J)	4,586	0.02	−0.09	0	±0
Internationalist Solidarity and Self-Management (SAIn)	4,400	0.02	−0.01	0	±0
The Eco-pacifist Greens (Centro Moderado)	3,278	0.01	New	0	±0
Land Party (PT)	3,026	0.01	New	0	±0
Canaries Decides (LV–UP–ALTER)^{13}	2,883	0.01	+0.01	0	±0
Libertarian Party (P–LIB)	2,854	0.01	±0.00	0	±0
Humanist Party (PH)	2,846	0.01	−0.03	0	±0
United Extremadura–Extremadurans (EU–eX)^{14}	2,021	0.01	+0.01	0	±0
Spanish Communist Workers' Party (PCOE)	1,909	0.01	New	0	±0
National Democracy (DN)	1,704	0.01	±0.00	0	±0
Feminist Initiative (IFem)	1,604	0.01	New	0	±0
Regionalist Party of the Leonese Country (PREPAL)	1,419	0.01	±0.00	0	±0
In Positive (En Positiu)	1,276	0.01	New	0	±0
United Free Citizens (CILUS)	1,189	0.00	New	0	±0
Grouped Rural Citizens (CRA)	1,032	0.00	New	0	±0
Navarrese Freedom (Ln)	1,026	0.00	New	0	±0
Forward Valencians (Avant)	1,003	0.00	New	0	±0
Málaga for Yes (mlgXSÍ)	934	0.00	New	0	±0
Family and Life Party (PFyV)	714	0.00	±0.00	0	±0
Andalusians of Jaén United (AJU)	711	0.00	New	0	±0
Independents for Aragon (i)	676	0.00	New	0	±0
Democratic Forum (FDEE)	456	0.00	New	0	±0
To Solution (Soluciona)	409	0.00	New	0	±0
Social Justice, Citizen Participation (JS,PC)	406	0.00	New	0	±0
Death to the System (+MAS+)	313	0.00	±0.00	0	±0
Liberal Party of the Right (PLD)	205	0.00	New	0	±0
Welcome (Ongi Etorri)	110	0.00	New	0	±0
Blank ballots	188,132	0.75	−0.62		
Total	25,211,313			350	±0
Valid votes	25,211,313	99.11	+0.40		
Invalid votes	227,219	0.89	−0.40		
Votes cast / turnout	25,438,532	69.67	+0.73		
Abstentions	11,073,316	30.33	−0.73		
Registered voters	36,511,848				
Sources
Footnotes: ^{1} People's Party results are compared to the combined totals of People's Party and Forum of Citizens in the 2011 election.; ^{2} We Can does not include results in Catalonia, Galicia and Valencian Community.; ^{3} In Common We Can results are compared to Initiative for Catalonia Greens–United and Alternative Left totals in the 2011 election.; ^{4} It is Time results are compared to Commitment Coalition–Equo totals in the 2011 election.; ^{5} In Tide results are compared to United Left of Galicia totals in the 2011 election.; ^{6} United Left–Popular Unity in Common results are compared to United Left–The Greens: Plural Left totals in the 2011 election. It does not include results in Catalonia and Galicia.; ^{7} Valencian Country Now results are compared to Republican Left of the Valencian Country totals in the 2011 election.; ^{8} Democracy and Freedom results are compared to Convergence and Union totals in the 2011 election.; ^{9} Basque Country Gather results are compared to Amaiur totals in the 2011 election.; ^{10} Canarian Coalition–Canarian Nationalist Party results are compared to Canarian Coalition–New Canaries totals in the 2011 election.; ^{11} We–Galician Candidacy results are compared to Galician Nationalist Bloc totals in the 2011 election.; ^{12} More for the Balearic Islands results are compared to PSM–Initiative Greens–Agreement–Equo totals in the 2011 election.; ^{13} Canaries Decides results are compared to Unity of the People totals in the 2011 election.; ^{14} United Extremadura–Extremadurans results are compared to Convergence for Extremadura totals in the 2011 election.

== Summary ==
=== Constituencies ===

Summary of constituency results in the 20 December 2015 Congress of Deputies election
Constituency	PP		PSOE		Podemos		C's		IU–UPeC		ERC		DiL		PNV		EH Bildu		CC–PNC	
Constituency	%	S	%	S	%	S	%	S	%	S	%	S	%	S	%	S	%	S	%	S
A Coruña	35.5	3	20.4	2	26.3	2	9.9	1												
Álava	18.8	1	14.1	1	27.0	1	5.9	−	3.8	−					15.8	1	11.8	−		
Albacete	36.8	2	28.2	1	14.0	−	14.6	1	4.0	−										
Alicante	32.8	4	20.8	3	22.3	3	17.1	2	3.7	−	0.1	−								
Almería	38.0	2	28.9	2	12.8	1	14.4	1	3.5	−										
Asturias	30.1	3	23.3	2	21.3	2	13.6	1	8.4	−										
Ávila	46.1	2	19.9	1	11.7	−	15.7	−	3.8	−										
Badajoz	34.5	2	37.2	3	11.9	1	11.4	−	3.1	−										
Balearic Islands	29.1	3	18.3	2	23.1	2	14.8	1	2.4	−										
Barcelona	11.3	4	16.3	5	26.9	9	13.5	4			14.5	5	13.2	4						
Biscay	11.4	1	13.0	1	26.1	2	3.8	−	2.8	−					27.9	3	12.5	1		
Burgos	38.0	2	20.7	1	17.1	1	15.6	−	4.7	−										
Cáceres	35.3	2	34.0	2	13.9	−	11.4	−	2.9	−										
Cádiz	27.7	3	28.0	3	20.2	2	14.7	1	6.0	−										
Cantabria	36.9	2	22.4	1	17.9	1	15.2	1	4.4	−										
Castellón	31.8	2	21.5	1	24.1	1	15.6	1	3.1	−	0.1	−								
Ceuta	44.9	1	23.1	−	14.1	−	13.3	−	1.3	−										
Ciudad Real	38.4	3	31.1	2	12.5	−	12.3	−	3.3	−										
Córdoba	30.4	2	32.0	2	14.7	1	11.9	1	8.1	−										
Cuenca	41.9	2	30.6	1	11.7	−	10.8	−	3.0	−										
Gipuzkoa	8.7	−	13.3	1	25.3	2	3.8	−	2.8	−					23.5	2	20.9	1		
Girona	8.5	−	12.7	1	16.3	1	9.8	−			23.5	2	25.0	2						
Granada	31.1	3	31.0	2	16.4	1	13.9	1	5.1	−										
Guadalajara	34.8	1	22.5	1	17.5	−	18.1	1	4.1	−										
Huelva	28.7	2	36.9	2	15.2	1	11.9	−	4.5	−										
Huesca	32.5	1	24.7	1	18.0	1	16.2	−	5.3	−										
Jaén	31.5	2	38.3	3	12.6	−	10.7	−	4.3	−										
La Rioja	38.3	2	23.7	1	15.8	1	15.1	−	4.2	−										
Las Palmas	28.2	3	22.4	2	26.5	2	12.3	1	3.0	−									4.2	−
León	35.6	2	25.4	1	17.6	1	13.0	1	4.8	−										
Lleida	11.3	−	12.4	1	15.4	1	9.0	−			22.3	1	24.3	1						
Lugo	42.5	2	24.0	1	19.2	1	7.6	−												
Madrid	33.4	13	17.8	6	20.9	8	18.8	7	5.3	2										
Málaga	28.9	4	26.9	3	17.1	2	17.1	2	6.8	−										
Melilla	43.9	1	24.6	−	11.4	−	15.5	−	1.3	−										
Murcia	40.4	5	20.3	2	15.2	1	17.7	2	3.1	−										
Navarre	28.9	2	15.5	1	23.0	2	7.1	−	4.1	−							9.9	−		
Ourense	44.9	2	23.2	1	17.8	1	7.9	−												
Palencia	40.3	2	24.5	1	13.5	−	14.2	−	4.5	−										
Pontevedra	34.5	3	20.8	2	27.9	2	9.0	−												
Salamanca	42.7	2	21.8	1	12.3	−	16.8	1	3.3	−										
Santa Cruz de Tenerife	28.9	2	21.5	2	19.9	1	10.5	1	3.3	−									12.6	1
Segovia	39.4	2	21.5	1	14.3	−	17.1	−	4.1	−										
Seville	25.2	3	33.9	5	19.0	2	13.0	2	5.7	−										
Soria	38.6	1	23.8	1	16.1	−	15.2	−	3.5	−										
Tarragona	12.2	1	15.8	1	20.6	1	14.2	1			17.5	1	15.3	1						
Teruel	36.4	2	25.7	1	15.3	−	14.7	−	5.0	−										
Toledo	38.8	2	27.8	2	13.6	1	13.8	1	3.5	−										
Valencia	30.2	5	18.8	3	27.1	5	15.1	2	4.7	−	0.1	−								
Valladolid	36.9	2	21.6	1	15.3	1	17.1	1	5.5	−										
Zamora	42.6	2	23.0	1	14.0	−	12.9	−	4.9	−										
Zaragoza	30.3	3	22.3	2	19.2	1	17.8	1	6.5	−										
Total	28.7	123	22.0	90	20.7	69	13.9	40	3.7	2	2.4	9	2.2	8	1.2	6	0.9	2	0.3	1

=== Regions ===

Summary of regional results in the 20 December 2015 Congress of Deputies election
Region	PP		PSOE		Podemos		C's		IU–UPeC		ERC		DiL		PNV		EH Bildu		CC–PNC	
Region	%	S	%	S	%	S	%	S	%	S	%	S	%	S	%	S	%	S	%	S
Andalusia	29.1	21	31.5	22	16.9	10	13.8	8	5.8	−										
Aragon	31.3	6	23.0	4	18.6	2	17.2	1	6.2	−										
Asturias	30.1	3	23.3	2	21.3	2	13.6	1	8.4	−										
Balearic Islands	29.1	3	18.3	2	23.1	2	14.8	1	2.4	−										
Basque Country	11.6	2	13.2	3	26.0	5	4.1	−	2.9	−					24.7	6	15.1	2		
Canary Islands	28.5	5	22.0	4	23.3	3	11.4	2	3.1	−									8.2	1
Cantabria	36.9	2	22.4	1	17.9	1	15.2	1	4.4	−										
Castile and León	39.1	17	22.5	9	15.1	3	15.4	3	4.6	−										
Castilla–La Mancha	38.1	10	28.4	7	13.7	1	13.8	3	3.6	−										
Catalonia	11.1	5	15.7	8	24.7	12	13.0	5			16.0	9	15.1	8						
Ceuta	44.9	1	23.1	−	14.1	−	13.3	−	1.3	−										
Extremadura	34.8	4	36.0	5	12.7	1	11.4	−	3.0	−										
Galicia	37.1	10	21.3	6	25.0	6	9.1	1												
La Rioja	38.3	2	23.7	1	15.8	1	15.1	−	4.2	−										
Madrid	33.4	13	17.8	6	20.9	8	18.8	7	5.3	2										
Melilla	43.9	1	24.6	−	11.4	−	15.5	−	1.3	−										
Murcia	40.4	5	20.3	2	15.2	1	17.7	2	3.1	−										
Navarre	28.9	2	15.5	1	23.0	2	7.1	−	4.1	−							9.9	−		
Valencian Community	31.3	11	19.8	7	25.1	9	15.8	5	4.2	–	0.1	–								
Total	28.7	123	22.0	90	20.7	69	13.9	40	3.7	2	2.4	9	2.2	8	1.2	6	0.9	2	0.3	1

== Autonomous communities ==
=== Andalusia ===
← Summary of the 20 December 2015 Congress of Deputies election results in Andalusia →
Parties and alliances	Popular vote			Seats	
Parties and alliances	Votes	%	±pp	Total	+/−
Spanish Socialist Workers' Party (PSOE)	1,402,393	31.50	−5.10	22	−3
People's Party (PP)	1,294,293	29.08	−16.49	21	−12
We Can (Podemos)	752,367	16.90	New	10	+10
Citizens–Party of the Citizenry (C's)	613,447	13.78	New	8	+8
United Left/Greens–Assembly for Andalusia–Popular Unity (IULV–CA–UPeC)	257,019	5.77	−2.50	0	−2
Animalist Party Against Mistreatment of Animals (PACMA)	40,879	0.92	+0.74	0	±0
Union, Progress and Democracy (UPyD)	23,179	0.52	−4.25	0	±0
Vox (Vox)	9,005	0.20	New	0	±0
Zero Cuts–Green Group (Recortes Cero–GV)	5,676	0.13	New	0	±0
Communist Party of the Peoples of Spain (PCPE)	5,368	0.12	−0.01	0	±0
Spanish Communist Workers' Party (PCOE)	1,909	0.04	New	0	±0
Spanish Phalanx of the CNSO (FE de las JONS)	1,826	0.04	±0.00	0	±0
Libertarian Party (P–LIB)	1,364	0.03	New	0	±0
United Free Citizens (CILUS)	1,189	0.03	New	0	±0
Málaga for Yes (mlgXSÍ)	934	0.02	New	0	±0
Andalusians of Jaén United (AJU)	711	0.02	New	0	±0
Blank Seats (EB)	631	0.01	−0.25	0	±0
For a Fairer World (PUM+J)	621	0.01	−0.06	0	±0
To Solution (Soluciona)	409	0.01	New	0	±0
National Democracy (DN)	356	0.01	−0.01	0	±0
Internationalist Solidarity and Self-Management (SAIn)	198	0.00	−0.04	0	±0
Blank ballots	37,729	0.85	−0.37		
Total	4,451,503			61	+1
Valid votes	4,451,503	99.06	+0.09		
Invalid votes	42,319	0.94	−0.09		
Votes cast / turnout	4,493,822	69.08	+0.18		
Abstentions	2,011,444	30.92	−0.18		
Registered voters	6,505,266				

=== Aragon ===
← Summary of the 20 December 2015 Congress of Deputies election results in Aragon →
Parties and alliances	Popular vote			Seats	
Parties and alliances	Votes	%	±pp	Total	+/−
People's Party–Aragonese Party (PP–PAR)	229,691	31.31	−16.39	6	−2
Spanish Socialist Workers' Party (PSOE)	169,057	23.05	−8.47	4	±0
We Can (Podemos)	136,434	18.60	New	2	+2
Citizens–Party of the Citizenry (C's)	126,346	17.22	New	1	+1
United Left–Aragonese Union–Popular Unity in Common (IU–CHA–UPeC)	45,199	6.16	−4.37	0	−1
Union, Progress and Democracy (UPyD)	5,803	0.79	−4.98	0	±0
Animalist Party Against Mistreatment of Animals (PACMA)	5,224	0.71	+0.23	0	±0
Blank Seats (EB)	3,834	0.52	+0.08	0	±0
Vox (Vox)	1,849	0.25	New	0	±0
Zero Cuts–Green Group (Recortes Cero–GV)	1,476	0.20	New	0	±0
Communist Party of the Peoples of Spain (PCPE)	1,199	0.16	−0.04	0	±0
Independents for Aragon (i)	676	0.09	New	0	±0
Blank ballots	6,791	0.93	−1.11		
Total	733,579			13	±0
Valid votes	733,579	99.17	+0.74		
Invalid votes	6,128	0.83	−0.74		
Votes cast / turnout	739,707	72.58	+1.59		
Abstentions	279,428	27.42	−1.59		
Registered voters	1,019,135				

=== Asturias ===
← Summary of the 20 December 2015 Congress of Deputies election results in Asturias →
Parties and alliances	Popular vote			Seats	
Parties and alliances	Votes	%	±pp	Total	+/−
People's Party–Forum (PP–Foro)^{1}	187,568	30.11	−19.97	3	−1
Spanish Socialist Workers' Party (PSOE)	145,113	23.29	−6.05	2	−1
We Can (Podemos)	132,984	21.35	New	2	+2
Citizens–Party of the Citizenry (C's)	84,464	13.56	New	1	+1
United Left–Popular Unity in Common–Asturian Left (IU–UPeC–IAS)	52,583	8.44	−4.80	0	−1
Animalist Party Against Mistreatment of Animals (PACMA)	4,555	0.73	+0.39	0	±0
Union, Progress and Democracy (UPyD)	3,855	0.62	−3.29	0	±0
Blank Seats (EB)	1,869	0.30	−0.10	0	±0
Vox (Vox)	1,715	0.28	New	0	±0
Communist Party of the Peoples of Spain (PCPE)	1,240	0.20	+0.01	0	±0
Zero Cuts–Green Group (Recortes Cero–GV)	1,038	0.17	New	0	±0
Humanist Party (PH)	392	0.06	+0.02	0	±0
Blank ballots	5,591	0.90	−0.43		
Total	622,967			8	±0
Valid votes	622,967	99.17	+0.14		
Invalid votes	5,233	0.83	−0.14		
Votes cast / turnout	628,200	63.77	−0.80		
Abstentions	356,887	36.23	+0.80		
Registered voters	985,087				
Sources
Footnotes: ^{1} People's Party–Forum results are compared to the combined totals of People's Party and Forum of Citizens in the 2011 election.

=== Balearic Islands ===
← Summary of the 20 December 2015 Congress of Deputies election results in the Balearic Islands →
Parties and alliances	Popular vote			Seats	
Parties and alliances	Votes	%	±pp	Total	+/−
People's Party (PP)	140,640	29.06	−20.53	3	−2
We Can (Podemos)	111,628	23.07	New	2	+2
Spanish Socialist Workers' Party (PSOE)	88,635	18.31	−10.56	2	−1
Citizens–Party of the Citizenry (C's)	71,551	14.78	New	1	+1
More for the Balearic Islands (Més)^{1}	33,877	7.00	−0.17	0	±0
El Pi–Proposal for the Isles (El Pi)	12,910	2.67	New	0	±0
United Left–Balearic Popular Unity (IU–UPB)	11,451	2.37	−2.57	0	±0
Animalist Party Against Mistreatment of Animals (PACMA)	5,114	1.06	+0.23	0	±0
Union, Progress and Democracy (UPyD)	2,276	0.47	−3.76	0	±0
Zero Cuts–Green Group (Recortes Cero–GV)	1,177	0.24	New	0	±0
Family and Life Party (PFyV)	714	0.15	−0.02	0	±0
Blank ballots	3,997	0.83	−0.98		
Total	483,970			8	±0
Valid votes	483,970	99.04	+0.66		
Invalid votes	4,696	0.96	−0.66		
Votes cast / turnout	488,666	63.35	+2.39		
Abstentions	282,715	36.65	−2.39		
Registered voters	771,381				
Sources
Footnotes: ^{1} More for the Balearic Islands results are compared to PSM–Initiative Greens–Agreement–Equo totals in the 2011 election.

=== Basque Country ===
← Summary of the 20 December 2015 Congress of Deputies election results in the Basque Country →
Parties and alliances	Popular vote			Seats	
Parties and alliances	Votes	%	±pp	Total	+/−
We Can (Podemos/Ahal Dugu)	317,674	25.98	New	5	+5
Basque Nationalist Party (EAJ/PNV)	302,316	24.72	−2.69	6	+1
Basque Country Gather (EH Bildu)^{1}	184,186	15.06	−9.05	2	−4
Socialist Party of the Basque Country–Basque Country Left (PSE–EE (PSOE))	161,988	13.25	−8.30	3	−1
People's Party (PP)	142,127	11.62	−6.19	2	−1
Citizens–Party of the Citizenry (C's)	50,268	4.11	New	0	±0
United Left–Popular Unity in Common (IU–UPeC)	36,002	2.94	−0.75	0	±0
Animalist Party Against Mistreatment of Animals (PACMA)	8,003	0.65	+0.11	0	±0
Union, Progress and Democracy (UPyD)	4,093	0.33	−1.47	0	±0
Zero Cuts–Green Group (Recortes Cero–GV)	2,432	0.20	New	0	±0
Blank Seats (EB/AZ)	1,518	0.12	−0.12	0	±0
Left–For the Left (Ezkerra)	1,447	0.12	New	0	±0
Communist Party of the Peoples of Spain (PCPE)	589	0.05	+0.01	0	±0
For a Fairer World (PUM+J)	479	0.04	−0.25	0	±0
Navarrese Freedom (Ln)	450	0.04	New	0	±0
Social Justice, Citizen Participation (JS,PC)	406	0.03	New	0	±0
Welcome (Ongi Etorri)	110	0.00	New	0	±0
Blank ballots	8,669	0.71	−0.43		
Total	1,222,757			18	±0
Valid votes	1,222,757	99.31	+0.35		
Invalid votes	8,441	0.69	−0.35		
Votes cast / turnout	1,231,198	69.00	+1.66		
Abstentions	553,031	31.00	−1.66		
Registered voters	1,784,229				
Sources
Footnotes: ^{1} Basque Country Gather results are compared to Amaiur totals in the 2011 election.

=== Canary Islands ===
← Summary of the 20 December 2015 Congress of Deputies election results in the Canary Islands →
Parties and alliances	Popular vote			Seats	
Parties and alliances	Votes	%	±pp	Total	+/−
People's Party (PP)	283,575	28.53	−19.44	5	−4
We Can (Podemos)	231,519	23.29	New	3	+3
Spanish Socialist Workers' Party–New Canaries (PSOE–NCa)	218,413	21.97	−2.88	4	±0
Citizens–Party of the Citizenry (C's)	113,642	11.43	New	2	+2
Canarian Coalition–Canarian Nationalist Party (CCa–PNC)^{1}	81,917	8.24	−7.23	1	−1
Canarian United Left–Popular Unity in Common (IUC–UPeC)	30,978	3.12	−1.19	0	±0
Animalist Party Against Mistreatment of Animals (PACMA)	11,888	1.20	+0.67	0	±0
Union, Progress and Democracy (UPyD)	4,681	0.47	−2.17	0	±0
Canaries Decides (LV–UP–ALTER)^{2}	2,883	0.29	+0.17	0	±0
Zero Cuts–Green Group (Recortes Cero–GV)	2,660	0.27	New	0	±0
Communist Party of the Canarian People (PCPC)	1,712	0.17	−0.08	0	±0
Vox (Vox)	1,546	0.16	New	0	±0
For a Fairer World (PUM+J)	616	0.06	−0.23	0	±0
Humanist Party (PH)	439	0.04	−0.07	0	±0
Internationalist Solidarity and Self-Management (SAIn)	300	0.03	±0.00	0	±0
Blank ballots	7,262	0.73	−0.57		
Total	994,031			15	±0
Valid votes	994,031	98.72	+0.42		
Invalid votes	12,900	1.28	−0.42		
Votes cast / turnout	1,006,931	60.33	+0.73		
Abstentions	661,980	39.67	−0.73		
Registered voters	1,668,911				
Sources
Footnotes: ^{1} Canarian Coalition–Canarian Nationalist Party results are compared to Canarian Coalition–New Canaries totals in the 2011 election.; ^{2} Canaries Decides results are compared to Unity of the People totals in the 2011 election.

=== Cantabria ===
← Summary of the 20 December 2015 Congress of Deputies election results in Cantabria →
Parties and alliances	Popular vote			Seats	
Parties and alliances	Votes	%	±pp	Total	+/−
People's Party (PP)	129,216	36.91	−15.26	2	−2
Spanish Socialist Workers' Party (PSOE)	78,460	22.41	−2.82	1	±0
We Can (Podemos)	62,569	17.87	New	1	+1
Citizens–Party of the Citizenry (C's)	53,371	15.25	New	1	+1
United Left–Popular Unity in Common (IU–UPeC)	15,488	4.42	+0.83	0	±0
Animalist Party Against Mistreatment of Animals (PACMA)	2,943	0.84	+0.49	0	±0
Union, Progress and Democracy (UPyD)	2,875	0.82	−2.77	0	±0
Vox (Vox)	901	0.26	New	0	±0
Zero Cuts–Green Group (Recortes Cero–GV)	529	0.15	New	0	±0
Communist Party of the Peoples of Spain (PCPE)	461	0.13	−0.03	0	±0
Humanist Party (PH)	236	0.07	−0.01	0	±0
Internationalist Solidarity and Self-Management (SAIn)	173	0.05	−0.03	0	±0
Blank ballots	2,849	0.81	−0.37		
Total	350,071			5	±0
Valid votes	350,071	98.90	+0.04		
Invalid votes	3,904	1.10	−0.04		
Votes cast / turnout	353,975	70.97	−0.59		
Abstentions	144,796	29.03	+0.59		
Registered voters	498,771				

=== Castile and León ===
← Summary of the 20 December 2015 Congress of Deputies election results in Castile and León →
Parties and alliances	Popular vote			Seats	
Parties and alliances	Votes	%	±pp	Total	+/−
People's Party (PP)	590,438	39.10	−16.27	17	−4
Spanish Socialist Workers' Party (PSOE)	339,277	22.47	−6.72	9	−2
Citizens–Party of the Citizenry (C's)	231,979	15.36	New	3	+3
We Can (Podemos)	227,577	15.07	New	3	+3
United Left–Popular Unity in Common (IU–UPeC)	68,816	4.56	−1.08	0	±0
Union, Progress and Democracy (UPyD)	13,096	0.87	−5.25	0	±0
Animalist Party Against Mistreatment of Animals (PACMA)	8,533	0.57	+0.21	0	±0
Vox (Vox)	4,053	0.27	New	0	±0
Zero Cuts–Green Group (Recortes Cero–GV)	2,526	0.17	New	0	±0
Communist Party of the Peoples of Spain (PCPE)	2,232	0.15	+0.09	0	±0
Citizens of Democratic Centre (CCD)	1,579	0.10	+0.07	0	±0
Regionalist Party of the Leonese Country (PREPAL)	1,419	0.09	−0.05	0	±0
Spanish Phalanx of the CNSO (FE de las JONS)	1,090	0.07	−0.01	0	±0
Grouped Rural Citizens (CRA)	1,032	0.07	New	0	±0
Internationalist Solidarity and Self-Management (SAIn)	845	0.06	±0.00	0	±0
National Democracy (DN)	703	0.05	+0.01	0	±0
Feminist Initiative (IFem)	341	0.02	New	0	±0
Blank Seats (EB)	182	0.01	−0.08	0	±0
Blank ballots	14,218	0.94	−0.72		
Total	1,509,936			32	±0
Valid votes	1,509,936	98.90	+0.33		
Invalid votes	16,790	1.10	−0.33		
Votes cast / turnout	1,526,754	71.22	−0.07		
Abstentions	616,884	28.78	+0.07		
Registered voters	2,143,638				

=== Castilla–La Mancha ===
← Summary of the 20 December 2015 Congress of Deputies election results in Castilla–La Mancha →
Parties and alliances	Popular vote			Seats	
Parties and alliances	Votes	%	±pp	Total	+/−
People's Party (PP)	446,235	38.14	−17.67	10	−4
Spanish Socialist Workers' Party (PSOE)	331,856	28.36	−1.98	7	±0
Citizens–Party of the Citizenry (C's)	161,083	13.77	New	3	+3
We Can (Podemos)	159,726	13.65	New	1	+1
United Left–Popular Unity in Common (IU–UPeC)	41,986	3.59	−2.19	0	±0
Animalist Party Against Mistreatment of Animals (PACMA)	8,260	0.71	+0.36	0	±0
Union, Progress and Democracy (UPyD)	6,162	0.53	−4.43	0	±0
Vox (Vox)	3,608	0.31	New	0	±0
Zero Cuts–Green Group (Recortes Cero–GV)	1,751	0.15	New	0	±0
Communist Party of the Peoples of Spain (PCPE)	654	0.06	−0.06	0	±0
Liberal Party of the Right (PLD)	205	0.02	New	0	±0
National Democracy (DN)	174	0.01	−0.03	0	±0
Internationalist Solidarity and Self-Management (SAIn)	75	0.01	New	0	±0
Blank ballots	8,244	0.70	−0.58		
Total	1,170,019			21	±0
Valid votes	1,170,019	98.85	+0.34		
Invalid votes	13,552	1.15	−0.34		
Votes cast / turnout	1,183,571	75.26	−0.50		
Abstentions	389,033	24.74	+0.50		
Registered voters	1,572,604				

=== Catalonia ===
← Summary of the 20 December 2015 Congress of Deputies election results in Catalonia →
Parties and alliances	Popular vote			Seats	
Parties and alliances	Votes	%	±pp	Total	+/−
In Common We Can (En Comú)^{1}	929,880	24.71	+16.62	12	+9
Republican Left of Catalonia–Catalonia Yes (ERC–CatSí)	601,782	15.99	+8.92	9	+6
Socialists' Party of Catalonia (PSC–PSOE)	590,274	15.69	−10.97	8	−6
Democracy and Freedom (DiL)^{2}	567,253	15.08	−14.27	8	−8
Citizens–Party of the Citizenry (C's)	490,872	13.05	New	5	+5
People's Party (PP)	418,369	11.12	−9.58	5	−6
Democratic Union of Catalonia (unio.cat)	65,388	1.74	New	0	±0
Animalist Party Against Mistreatment of Animals (PACMA)	43,930	1.17	+0.48	0	±0
Zero Cuts–Green Group (Recortes Cero–GV)	12,911	0.34	New	0	±0
Union, Progress and Democracy (UPyD)	8,554	0.23	−0.92	0	±0
Communist Party of the Catalan People (PCPC)	7,116	0.19	+0.15	0	±0
Blank Seats (EB)	625	0.02	−1.45	0	±0
Vox (Vox)	465	0.01	New	0	±0
Blank ballots	25,440	0.68	−1.17		
Total	3,762,859			47	±0
Valid votes	3,762,859	99.39	+0.97		
Invalid votes	23,065	0.61	−0.97		
Votes cast / turnout	3,785,924	68.63	+3.47		
Abstentions	1,730,532	31.37	−3.47		
Registered voters	5,516,456				
Sources
Footnotes: ^{1} In Common We Can results are compared to Initiative for Catalonia Greens–United and Alternative Left: Plural L. totals in the 2011 election.; ^{2} Democracy and Freedom results are compared to Convergence and Union totals in the 2011 election.

=== Extremadura ===
← Summary of the 20 December 2015 Congress of Deputies election results in Extremadura →
Parties and alliances	Popular vote			Seats	
Parties and alliances	Votes	%	±pp	Total	+/−
Spanish Socialist Workers' Party (PSOE)	233,251	35.98	−1.21	5	+1
People's Party (PP)	225,564	34.79	−16.39	4	−2
We Can (Podemos)	82,098	12.66	New	1	+1
Citizens–Party of the Citizenry (C's)	73,756	11.38	New	0	±0
United Left–Popular Unity in Common (IU–UPeC)	19,590	3.02	−2.68	0	±0
Animalist Party Against Mistreatment of Animals (PACMA)	3,404	0.53	+0.19	0	±0
Union, Progress and Democracy (UPyD)	2,620	0.40	−3.06	0	±0
United Extremadura–Extremadurans (EU–eX)^{1}	2,021	0.31	+0.16	0	±0
Zero Cuts–Green Group (Recortes Cero–GV)	846	0.13	New	0	±0
Vox (Vox)	518	0.08	New	0	±0
Blank ballots	4,676	0.72	−0.45		
Total	648,344			10	±0
Valid votes	648,344	98.68	+0.09		
Invalid votes	8,651	1.32	−0.09		
Votes cast / turnout	656,995	72.17	−1.74		
Abstentions	253,289	27.83	+1.74		
Registered voters	910,284				
Sources
Footnotes: ^{1} United Extremadura–Extremadurans results are compared to Convergence for Extremadura totals in the 2011 election.

=== Galicia ===
← Summary of the 20 December 2015 Congress of Deputies election results in Galicia →
Parties and alliances	Popular vote			Seats	
Parties and alliances	Votes	%	±pp	Total	+/−
People's Party (PP)	609,623	37.12	−15.41	10	−5
In Tide (Podemos–Anova–EU)^{1}	410,698	25.01	+20.28	6	+6
Socialists' Party of Galicia (PSdeG–PSOE)	350,220	21.33	−6.48	6	±0
Citizens–Party of the Citizenry (C's)	148,852	9.06	New	1	+1
We–Galician Candidacy (Nós)^{2}	70,863	4.32	−6.86	0	−2
Animalist Party Against Mistreatment of Animals (PACMA)	13,523	0.82	+0.37	0	±0
Union, Progress and Democracy (UPyD)	8,456	0.51	−0.70	0	±0
Zero Cuts–Green Group (Recortes Cero–GV)	3,829	0.23	New	0	±0
Communists of Galicia (PCPE–CdG)	3,245	0.20	+0.10	0	±0
Land Party (PT)	3,026	0.18	New	0	±0
Vox (Vox)	1,246	0.08	New	0	±0
For the Left–The Greens (X Izda)	873	0.05	New	0	±0
Internationalist Solidarity and Self-Management (SAIn)	429	0.03	−0.02	0	±0
Blank ballots	17,349	1.06	−0.56		
Total	1,642,232			23	±0
Valid votes	1,642,232	98.64	+0.26		
Invalid votes	22,719	1.36	−0.26		
Votes cast / turnout	1,664,951	61.53	−0.68		
Abstentions	1,040,901	38.47	+0.68		
Registered voters	2,705,852				
Sources
Footnotes: ^{1} In Tide results are compared to United Left–The Greens: Plural Left totals in the 2011 election.; ^{2} We–Galician Candidacy results are compared to Galician Nationalist Bloc totals in the 2011 election.

=== La Rioja ===
← Summary of the 20 December 2015 Congress of Deputies election results in La Rioja →
Parties and alliances	Popular vote			Seats	
Parties and alliances	Votes	%	±pp	Total	+/−
People's Party (PP)	67,941	38.34	−16.36	2	−1
Spanish Socialist Workers' Party (PSOE)	41,973	23.69	−7.40	1	±0
We Can (Podemos)	28,073	15.84	New	1	+1
Citizens–Party of the Citizenry (C's)	26,812	15.13	New	0	±0
United Left–Popular Unity in Common (IU–UPeC)	7,423	4.19	−0.21	0	±0
Union, Progress and Democracy (UPyD)	1,361	0.77	−5.19	0	±0
Animalist Party Against Mistreatment of Animals (PACMA)	1,177	0.66	+0.21	0	±0
Blank Seats (EB)	362	0.20	−0.36	0	±0
Zero Cuts–Green Group (Recortes Cero–GV)	360	0.20	New	0	±0
Communist Party of the Peoples of Spain (PCPE)	229	0.13	−0.09	0	±0
Blank ballots	1,496	0.84	−0.77		
Total	177,207			4	±0
Valid votes	177,207	98.85	+0.43		
Invalid votes	2,062	1.15	−0.43		
Votes cast / turnout	179,269	72.43	−0.35		
Abstentions	68,238	27.57	+0.35		
Registered voters	247,507				

=== Madrid ===
← Summary of the 20 December 2015 Congress of Deputies election results in Madrid →
Parties and alliances	Popular vote			Seats	
Parties and alliances	Votes	%	±pp	Total	+/−
People's Party (PP)	1,210,219	33.44	−17.53	13	−6
We Can (Podemos)	756,257	20.90	New	8	+8
Citizens–Party of the Citizenry (C's)	681,167	18.82	New	7	+7
Spanish Socialist Workers' Party (PSOE)	645,645	17.84	−8.21	6	−4
United Left–Popular Unity in Common (IU–UPeC)	190,193	5.26	−2.78	2	−1
Union, Progress and Democracy (UPyD)	43,508	1.20	−9.10	0	−4
Animalist Party Against Mistreatment of Animals (PACMA)	28,322	0.78	+0.39	0	±0
Vox (Vox)	22,643	0.63	New	0	±0
For the Left–The Greens (X Izda)	4,994	0.14	New	0	±0
Spanish Phalanx of the CNSO (FE de las JONS)	4,579	0.13	New	0	±0
Zero Cuts–Green Group (Recortes Cero–GV)	4,037	0.11	New	0	±0
For a Fairer World (PUM+J)	2,870	0.08	−0.08	0	±0
Humanist Party (PH)	1,779	0.05	−0.03	0	±0
Communist Party of the Peoples of Spain (PCPE)	1,742	0.05	−0.06	0	±0
Internationalist Solidarity and Self-Management (SAIn)	1,137	0.03	−0.01	0	±0
Libertarian Party (P–LIB)	1,075	0.03	−0.02	0	±0
Blank ballots	18,751	0.52	−0.52		
Total	3,618,918			36	±0
Valid votes	3,618,918	99.36	+0.40		
Invalid votes	23,209	0.64	−0.40		
Votes cast / turnout	3,642,127	74.12	+0.86		
Abstentions	1,271,766	25.88	−0.86		
Registered voters	4,913,893				

=== Murcia ===
← Summary of the 20 December 2015 Congress of Deputies election results in Murcia →
Parties and alliances	Popular vote			Seats	
Parties and alliances	Votes	%	±pp	Total	+/−
People's Party (PP)	293,943	40.40	−23.82	5	−3
Spanish Socialist Workers' Party (PSOE)	147,883	20.32	−0.67	2	±0
Citizens–Party of the Citizenry (C's)	128,570	17.67	New	2	+2
We Can (Podemos)	110,601	15.20	New	1	+1
Popular Unity in Common–United Left/Greens (UPeC–IU)	22,767	3.13	−2.57	0	±0
Animalist Party Against Mistreatment of Animals (PACMA)	6,591	0.91	+0.55	0	±0
Union, Progress and Democracy (UPyD)	5,442	0.75	−5.51	0	±0
Vox (Vox)	3,282	0.45	New	0	±0
Zero Cuts–Green Group (Recortes Cero–GV)	1,268	0.17	New	0	±0
Blank Seats (EB)	1,063	0.15	−0.09	0	±0
Communist Party of the Peoples of Spain (PCPE)	1,051	0.14	−0.01	0	±0
Internationalist Solidarity and Self-Management (SAIn)	330	0.05	New	0	±0
Death to the System (+MAS+)	313	0.04	−0.07	0	±0
Blank ballots	4,511	0.62	−0.29		
Total	727,615			10	±0
Valid votes	727,615	99.13	+0.06		
Invalid votes	6,382	0.87	−0.06		
Votes cast / turnout	733,997	71.14	−2.97		
Abstentions	297,736	28.86	+2.97		
Registered voters	1,031,733				

=== Navarre ===
← Summary of the 20 December 2015 Congress of Deputies election results in Navarre →
Parties and alliances	Popular vote			Seats	
Parties and alliances	Votes	%	±pp	Total	+/−
Navarrese People's Union–People's Party (UPN–PP)	102,244	28.94	−9.27	2	±0
We Can (Podemos)	81,216	22.98	New	2	+2
Spanish Socialist Workers' Party (PSOE)	54,856	15.52	−6.50	1	±0
Basque Country Gather (EH Bildu)	34,939	9.89	−4.97	0	−1
Yes to the Future (GBai)	30,642	8.67	−4.14	0	−1
Citizens–Party of the Citizenry (C's)	24,969	7.07	New	0	±0
United Left–Assembly–Popular Unity in Common (IU–B–UPeC)	14,528	4.11	−1.40	0	±0
Animalist Party Against Mistreatment of Animals (PACMA)	2,343	0.66	New	0	±0
Union, Progress and Democracy (UPyD)	1,452	0.41	−1.65	0	±0
Zero Cuts–Green Group (Recortes Cero–GV)	956	0.27	New	0	±0
Internationalist Solidarity and Self-Management (SAIn)	913	0.26	−0.06	0	±0
Navarrese Freedom (Ln)	576	0.16	New	0	±0
Blank ballots	3,714	1.05	−0.98		
Total	353,348			5	±0
Valid votes	353,348	99.13	+0.72		
Invalid votes	3,114	0.87	−0.72		
Votes cast / turnout	356,462	70.93	+2.02		
Abstentions	146,058	29.07	−2.02		
Registered voters	502,520				

=== Valencian Community ===
← Summary of the 20 December 2015 Congress of Deputies election results in the Valencian Community →
Parties and alliances	Popular vote			Seats	
Parties and alliances	Votes	%	±pp	Total	+/−
People's Party (PP)	838,135	31.26	−22.06	11	−9
It is Time (Podemos–Compromís)^{1}	673,549	25.12	+20.31	9	+8
Spanish Socialist Workers' Party (PSOE)	531,489	19.83	−6.92	7	−3
Citizens–Party of the Citizenry (C's)	424,621	15.84	New	5	+5
United Left of the Valencian Country–Popular Unity in Common (EUPV–UPeC)	111,963	4.18	−2.33	0	−1
Animalist Party Against Mistreatment of Animals (PACMA)	25,008	0.93	+0.45	0	±0
Union, Progress and Democracy (UPyD)	17,303	0.65	−4.95	0	−1
Citizens of Democratic Centre (CCD)	9,248	0.34	New	0	±0
Vox (Vox)	7,283	0.27	New	0	±0
We Are Valencian (SOMVAL)	6,103	0.23	New	0	±0
Zero Cuts–Green Group (Recortes Cero–GV)	5,011	0.19	New	0	±0
Communist Party of the Peoples of Spain (PCPE)	4,341	0.16	−0.01	0	±0
The Eco-pacifist Greens (Centro Moderado)	3,278	0.12	New	0	±0
Valencian Country Now (Ara PV)^{2}	2,503	0.09	−0.20	0	±0
In Positive (En Positiu)	1,276	0.05	New	0	±0
Feminist Initiative (IFem)	1,263	0.05	New	0	±0
Forward Valencians (Avant)	1,003	0.04	New	0	±0
National Democracy (DN)	471	0.02	New	0	±0
Democratic Forum (FDEE)	456	0.02	New	0	±0
Libertarian Party (P–LIB)	415	0.02	New	0	±0
Blank ballots	16,133	0.60	−0.50		
Total	2,680,852			32	−1
Valid votes	2,680,852	99.14	+0.34		
Invalid votes	23,170	0.86	−0.34		
Votes cast / turnout	2,704,022	74.79	+0.61		
Abstentions	911,260	25.21	−0.61		
Registered voters	3,615,282				
Sources
Footnotes: ^{1} It is Time results are compared to Commitment Coalition–Equo totals in the 2011 election.; ^{2} Valencian Country Now results are compared to Republican Left of the Valencian Country totals in the 2011 election.

== Autonomous cities ==
=== Ceuta ===
← Summary of the 20 December 2015 Congress of Deputies election results in Ceuta →
Parties and alliances	Popular vote			Seats	
Parties and alliances	Votes	%	±pp	Total	+/−
People's Party (PP)	14,813	44.86	−21.07	1	±0
Spanish Socialist Workers' Party (PSOE)	7,627	23.10	+2.84	0	±0
We Can (Podemos)	4,646	14.07	New	0	±0
Citizens–Party of the Citizenry (C's)	4,392	13.30	New	0	±0
United Left–Popular Unity in Common (IU–UPeC)	431	1.31	−0.50	0	±0
Animalist Party Against Mistreatment of Animals (PACMA)	358	1.08	+0.50	0	±0
Union, Progress and Democracy (UPyD)	197	0.60	−2.74	0	±0
Zero Cuts–Green Group (Recortes Cero–GV)	146	0.44	New	0	±0
Blank ballots	413	1.25	−0.32		
Total	33,023			1	±0
Valid votes	33,023	98.53	+0.01		
Invalid votes	493	1.47	−0.01		
Votes cast / turnout	33,516	54.36	+1.20		
Abstentions	28,144	45.64	−1.20		
Registered voters	61,660				

=== Melilla ===
← Summary of the 20 December 2015 Congress of Deputies election results in Melilla →
Parties and alliances	Popular vote			Seats	
Parties and alliances	Votes	%	±pp	Total	+/−
People's Party (PP)	12,331	43.91	−22.80	1	±0
Spanish Socialist Workers' Party (PSOE)	6,905	24.59	−0.73	0	±0
Citizens–Party of the Citizenry (C's)	4,366	15.55	New	0	±0
We Can (Podemos)	3,215	11.45	New	0	±0
Popular Unity–United Left (UP–IU)	366	1.30	New	0	±0
Animalist Party Against Mistreatment of Animals (PACMA)	314	1.12	+0.61	0	±0
Union, Progress and Democracy (UPyD)	240	0.85	−2.86	0	±0
Zero Cuts–Green Group (Recortes Cero–GV)	46	0.16	New	0	±0
Blank ballots	299	1.06	−0.80		
Total	28,082			1	±0
Valid votes	28,082	98.72	−0.14		
Invalid votes	363	1.28	+0.14		
Votes cast / turnout	28,445	49.35	−0.08		
Abstentions	29,194	50.65	+0.08		
Registered voters	57,639				
