= Marta Torrado de Castro =

Spanish politician

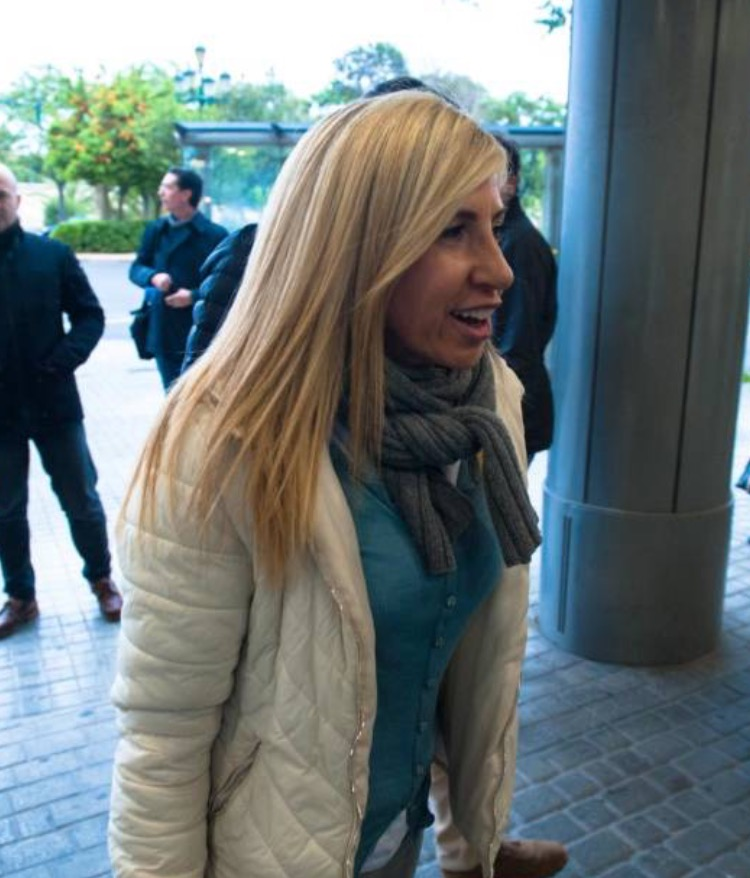
Marta Torrado de Castro (2017)

Marta Torrado de Castro (Valencia, Spain, 20 January 1966) is a Spanish politician who is member of the People's Party (PP).

Married, Torrado holds a degree in law. After serving in various roles within the Valencian regional administration she was elected to the Spanish Congress of Deputies in the 2008 election as the representative of the Valencia region. After being awarded the fifth place on the PP list, she was virtually guaranteed victory because her party consistently won at least five seats in elections since 1982.
