= Cannabis Party (Spain) =

Political initiatives in Spain

The Cannabis Party in Spain (Partido Cannabico) refers to different initiatives of political party and political campaigning centered around cannabis, hemp and drug policy reform proposals.

According to researchers, Spain is the European country with the most rich and vivid social movements in favour of cannabis policy reform. This also translated into a variety of political parties and proposals along the years.

== 2003–2006: Cannabis Party for Legalisation and Normalisation ==
Partido Cannabis por la Legalización y la Normalización (PCLYN; English: Cannabis Party for Legalisation and Normalisation) was formed at the end of 2003 in Valencia, Spain, although its first Congress was held in January 2004.

At the beginning, it was promoted by different social movements and collectives, among which were three important non-profits:

- "Asociación de la Cultura Cannábica" (Cannabis Culture Association, also sometimes called La Barraca de María),
- "Asociación de Internautas Cannabis Café" (Association of Internet users 'Cannabis Cafe', or AICC),
- "Federación de Asociaciones Cannábicas" (Federation of Cannabis Associations or FAC), the federation of cannabis social clubs (nowadays called ConFAC).

=== Election results ===
The first elections where PCLYN presented candidates were the Municipal Elections of 25 May 2003 in the city of Valencia. The party obtained 4,176 votes.

At the General Elections of 14 March 2004, PCLYN presented candidates in three provinces, with the following results:

- Alicante. Parliament: 5,446 votes. Senate: 13,240 votes.
- València. Parliament: 9,563 votes. Senate: 35,278 votes.
- Valladolid. Parliament: 1,836 votes. Senate: 7,938 votes.

The last elections the party aspired to were the European Elections of 13 June 2004, with a list headed by Hector Boix. The party obtained a total of 53,767 votes (0.35%).

=== Discontinuation ===
In its early days, the party suffered a split, with those belonging to the AICC resigning from the party in February 2004. Other members became dissatisfied with the leadership of the party and its internal electoral processes following the party's first general meeting in May 2003. The splits caused logistical problems for the party which also suffered external attacks such as a denial-of-service attack on their web host on 16 May 2004. Nonetheless, the party continued its activities, holding meetings with groups such as Republican Left party (ERPV) or the Confederation of the Greens, as well as with Rastafari members. In October 2006, original members of the party announced its reformation and reorganised. However, due to a lack of logistical and economical means, the party could not present further candidates to any other elections.

== 2010–2021: Representacion Cannabica de Navarra – Nafarroako Ordezkaritza Kanabikoa (Cannabis Representation of Navarre) ==
In 2010, a new political party was created din the Navarre autonomous region of Spain: Representacion Cannabica de Navarra – Nafarroako Ordezkaritza Kanabikoa (RCN-NOK), which translated as Cannabis Representation of Navarre.

"achieve decriminalization and eliminate the prohibition of the use, cultivation and trade of cannabis and its derivatives both for private recreational and therapeutic use of cannabis through the application of the green project"

=== Election results ===
The first elections where RCN-NOK presented candidates were the Municipal Elections of 2007 in Navarra, where they obtained 4,685 votes.

At the 2008 General Elections, the party presented candidates in four constituencies:

- Alicante: 1,823 votos.
- Navarra. Parliament: 2,275 votos. Senate: 8,172 votos. (Julio Arribas: 3,572 votes. - Alejandro Curiel: 2,381 votes - Ester Gochi: 2,219 votes)
- Málaga. Parliament: 1,145 votes
- València: 2,477 votes.

=== Discontinuation ===
In 2020, the police raided the cannabis social club which hosted the head offices of the party, in Pamplona.

In 2021, RCN-NOK opted to join the new nationwide cannabis party, Luz Verde.

== 2021–present: Luz Verde (Green Light) ==
During summer 2021, a group of historical Spanish cannabis activists from different social movements and regions, launched the Luz Verte–Partido Cannábico (Green Light Cannabis Party) political party project.

The party was reportedly created to address the "growing pressure on cannabis users amidst the COVID-19 pandemic" which the party saw exemplified by the imprisonment of two well-known cannabis activists (Albert Tió and Victor Segués), the wave of controls and repression over CBD shops and the destruction of some industrial hemp crops, lack of transparency in the granting of licenses by the Spanish Agency for Medicines and medical devices, and more importantly, the cancellation by the Constitutional Court of the regional cannabis laws which had been approved in 2014 in Navarra and in 2017 in Catalonia, as well as the municipal regulations of the cities of Barcelona and San Sebastián.

The original president of the party was 83 years old Spanish activist Fernanda de la Figuera, known as "abuela marihuana" (the marijuana granny), until her death in 2022. She had previously been candidate for RCN-NOK in Málaga in 2004.

Shortly after its creation, the party was at risk of dissolution for a number of procedural and formal issues. The dissolution was avoided, and the party could run for its first elections during the May 2023 local elections.

=== Elections results ===
Municipal Elections of 28 May 2023:

- Barcelona: 932 votes (0.14%).
- Madrid: 1,442 (0.08%).
- Murillo el Fruto: 122 votes (32.01%, in a constituency of about 600 voters). The party obtained two seats at the village's municipal council.

The party declared to local press they had obtained "the first two elected cannabis city council members of Europe" although the campaign geared around the creation of hemp-related economical and agricultural activity in the village, rather than psychoactive cannabis-related issues.

Luz Verde is also involved in social movement in defense of cannabis social clubs in Barcelona and other forms of activism.

== See also ==
- Cannabis in Spain
- Cannabis political parties
