= Alicante (Congress of Deputies constituency) =

Electoral constituency in Spain

Coordinates: 38°30′N 0°30′W

- Congress of Deputies; Electoral constituency
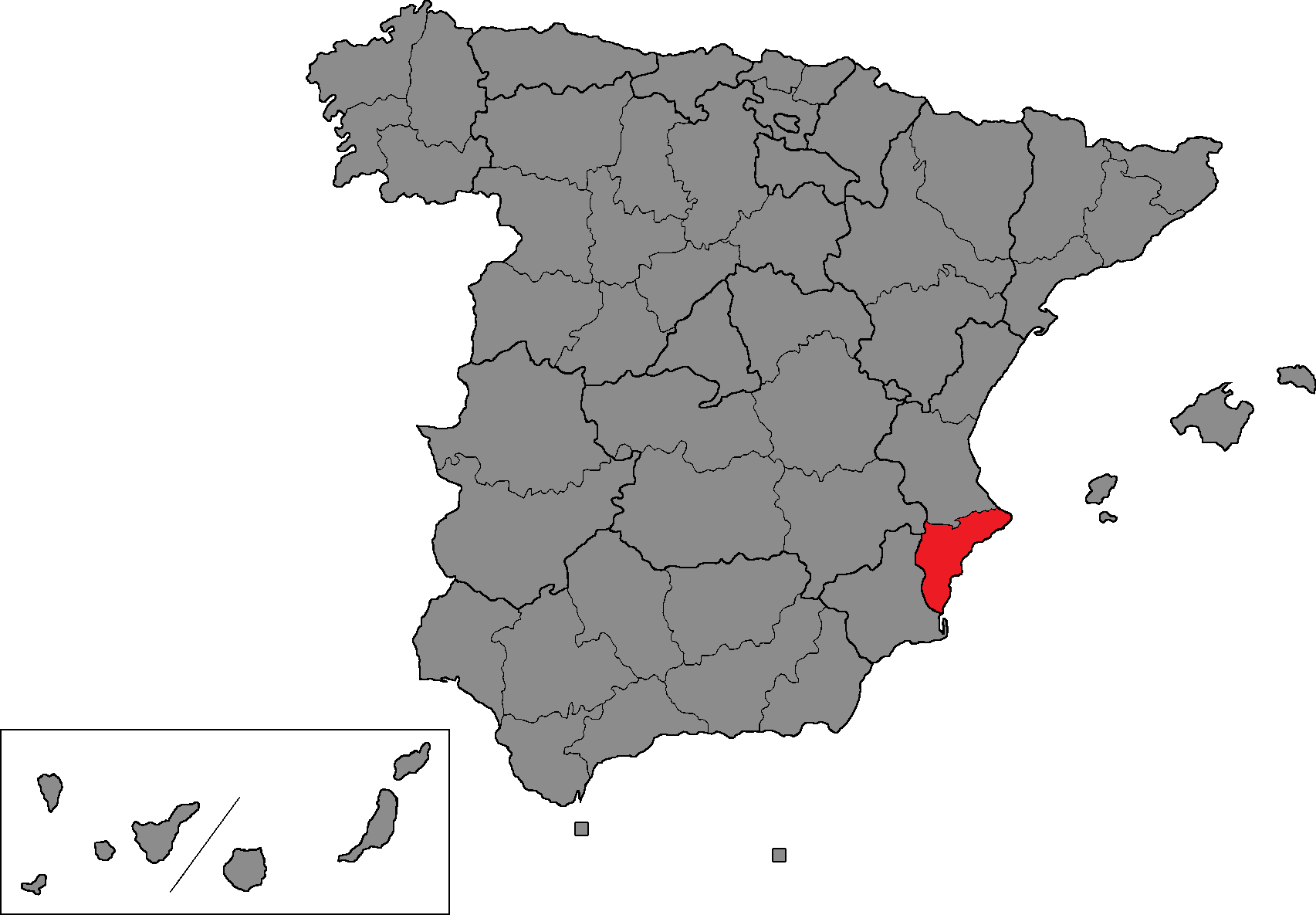
- Location of Alicante within Spain
- Province: Alicante
- Autonomous community: Valencian Community
- Population: ▲1,991,259 (2024)
- Electorate: ▲1,306,311 (2023)
- Major settlements: Alicante, Elche, Alcoy, Elda, Benidorm, Orihuela

Current constituency
- Created: 1977
- Seats: 9 (1977–1986); 10 (1986–1996); 11 (1996–2008); 12 (2008–present)
- Members: PP (5); PSOE (4); Vox (2); Sumar (1)

Alicante (Valencian: Alacant) is one of the 52 constituencies represented in the Congress of Deputies, the lower chamber of the Spanish parliament, the Cortes Generales. The constituency (whose boundaries correspond to those of the homonymous province) currently elects 12 deputies. The electoral system uses the D'Hondt method and closed-list proportional voting, with a minimum threshold of three percent.

== Electoral system ==
The constituency was created as per the Political Reform Law and was first contested in the 1977 general election. The Law provided for the provinces of Spain to be established as multi-member districts in the Congress of Deputies, with this regulation being maintained under the Spanish Constitution of 1978. Additionally, the Constitution requires for any modification of the provincial limits to be approved under an organic law, needing an absolute majority in the Cortes Generales.

Voting is based on universal suffrage, comprising all Spanish nationals over 18 years of age with full political rights, provided that they have not been deprived of the right to vote by a final sentence. The only exception was in 1977, when this was limited to nationals over 21 years of age and in full enjoyment of their political and civil rights. Amendments in 2011 required non-resident citizens to apply for voting, a system known as "begged" voting (Spanish: Voto rogado). which was abolished in 2022. Further, amendments in 2018 granted the right to vote to those legally incapacitated. The Congress of Deputies has a minimum of 300 and a maximum of 400 seats, with electoral provisions fixing its size at 350. Of these, 348 are elected in 50 multi-member constituencies corresponding to the provinces of Spain—each of which is assigned an initial minimum of two seats and the remaining 248 distributed in proportion to population—using the D'Hondt method and closed-list proportional voting, with a three percent-threshold of valid votes (including blank ballots) in each constituency. The remaining two seats are allocated to Ceuta and Melilla as single-member districts elected by plurality voting. The use of this electoral method may result in a higher effective threshold depending on district magnitude and vote distribution. The law does not provide for by-elections to fill vacant seats; instead, any vacancies arising after the proclamation of candidates and during the legislative term are filled by the next candidates on the party lists or, when required, by designated substitutes.

The electoral law allows for parties and federations registered in the interior ministry, alliances and groupings of electors to present lists of candidates. Parties and federations intending to form an alliance are required to inform the relevant electoral commission within 10 days of the election call—15 before 1985—whereas groupings of electors need to secure the signature of at least one percent of the electorate in the constituencies for which they seek election—one permille of the electorate, with a compulsory minimum of 500 signatures, until 1985—disallowing electors from signing for more than one list. Also since 2011, parties, federations or alliances that have not obtained a mandate in either chamber of the Cortes at the preceding election are required to secure the signature of at least 0.1 percent of electors in the aforementioned constituencies. Amendments in 2007 required a balanced composition of men and women in the electoral lists, so that candidates of either sex made up at least 40 percent of the total composition; further amendments in 2024 required the use of a zipper system.

== Deputies ==
Deputies 1977–present
Key to parties PCE IU U.Podemos ALV EEM SPG PSOE CDS Cs UCD PP CP AP Vox
Legislature	Election	Distribution
Constituent	1977	1 / 4 / 4
1st	1979	1 / 4 / 4
2nd	1982	6 / 3
3rd	1986	6 / 1 / 3
4th	1989	1 / 5 / 1 / 3
5th	1993	1 / 4 / 5
6th	1996	1 / 5 / 5
7th	2000	4 / 7
8th	2004	5 / 6
9th	2008	5 / 7
10th	2011	4 / 8
11th	2015	3 / 3 / 2 / 4
12th	2016	3 / 2 / 2 / 5
13th	2019 (Apr)	2 / 4 / 2 / 3 / 1
14th	2019 (Nov)	1 / 4 / 1 / 3 / 3
15th	2023	1 / 4 / 5 / 2

== General elections ==
=== 2026 ===
Summary of the 29 November 2026 Congress of Deputies election results in Alicante
Parties and alliances	Popular vote			Seats	
Parties and alliances	Votes	%	±pp	Total	+/−
People's Party (PP)					
Spanish Socialist Workers' Party (PSOE)					
Vox (Vox)					
Commitment: Valencian Front (Compromís–EUPV–Podem–ERPV)^{1}					
Animalist Party with the Environment (PACMA)					
Workers' Front (FO)					
Self-employed Party (Partido Autónomos)					
The Party is Over (SALF)			New		
Communist Party of the Workers of Spain (PCTE)			New		
Blank ballots					
Total				12	±0
Valid votes					
Invalid votes					
Votes cast / turnout					
Abstentions					
Registered voters	1,359,229				
Sources
Footnotes: ^{1} Commitment: Valencian Front results are compared to the combined totals of We Unite to Win and Zero Cuts in the 2023 election.

=== 2023 ===
Summary of the 23 July 2023 Congress of Deputies election results in Alicante
Parties and alliances	Popular vote			Seats	
Parties and alliances	Votes	%	±pp	Total	+/−
People's Party (PP)	330,293	36.73	+12.39	5	+2
Spanish Socialist Workers' Party (PSOE)	287,737	32.00	+3.80	4	±0
Vox (Vox)	146,133	16.25	–3.40	2	–1
Commitment–Unite: We Unite to Win (Sumar–Compromís)^{1}	115,787	12.88	–4.04	1	±0
Animalist Party with the Environment (PACMA)^{2}	7,335	0.82	–0.29	0	±0
Workers' Front (FO)	1,724	0.19	New	0	±0
Self-employed Party (Partido Autónomos)	1,446	0.16	New	0	±0
Zero Cuts (Recortes Cero)	1,135	0.13	+0.03	0	±0
Walking Together (CJ)	1,027	0.11	New	0	±0
Citizens–Party of the Citizenry (Cs)	n/a	n/a	–8.12	0	–1
Blank ballots	6,575	0.73	–0.07		
Total	899,192			12	±0
Valid votes	899,192	98.94	–0.09		
Invalid votes	9,650	1.06	+0.09		
Votes cast / turnout	908,842	69.57	+2.20		
Abstentions	397,469	30.43	–2.20		
Registered voters	1,306,311				
Sources
Footnotes: ^{1} Commitment–Unite: We Unite to Win results are compared to the combined totals of United We Can and More Commitment in the November 2019 election.; ^{2} Animalist Party with the Environment results are compared to Animalist Party Against Mistreatment of Animals totals in the November 2019 election.

=== November 2019 ===
Summary of the 10 November 2019 Congress of Deputies election results in Alicante
Parties and alliances	Popular vote			Seats	
Parties and alliances	Votes	%	±pp	Total	+/−
Spanish Socialist Workers' Party (PSOE)	240,202	28.20	–0.07	4	±0
People's Party (PP)	207,310	24.34	+4.82	3	±0
Vox (Vox)	167,395	19.65	+7.09	3	+2
United We Can (Podemos–EUPV)	108,533	12.74	–1.17	1	–1
Citizens–Party of the Citizenry (Cs)	69,143	8.12	–11.25	1	–1
More Commitment (Més Compromís)^{1}	35,612	4.18	+0.80	0	±0
Animalist Party Against Mistreatment of Animals (PACMA)	9,417	1.11	–0.30	0	±0
The Eco-pacifist Greens–Forward (Avant/Adelante–LVEP)	2,337	0.27	–0.08	0	±0
Republican Left of the Valencian Country (ERPV)	1,683	0.20	+0.07	0	±0
For a Fairer World (PUM+J)	948	0.11	New	0	±0
Communist Party of the Peoples of Spain (PCPE)	911	0.11	–0.04	0	±0
Zero Cuts–Green Group (Recortes Cero–GV)	891	0.10	–0.07	0	±0
Libertarian Party (P–LIB)	556	0.07	–0.04	0	±0
Blank ballots	6,778	0.80	+0.12		
Total	851,716			12	±0
Valid votes	851,716	99.03	+0.12		
Invalid votes	8,334	0.97	–0.12		
Votes cast / turnout	860,050	67.37	–5.51		
Abstentions	416,641	32.63	+5.51		
Registered voters	1,276,691				
Sources
Footnotes: ^{1} More Commitment results are compared to Commitment: Bloc–Initiative–Greens Equo totals in the April 2019 election.

=== April 2019 ===
Summary of the 28 April 2019 Congress of Deputies election results in Alicante
Parties and alliances	Popular vote			Seats	
Parties and alliances	Votes	%	±pp	Total	+/−
Spanish Socialist Workers' Party (PSOE)	259,404	28.27	+6.85	4	+2
People's Party (PP)	179,056	19.52	–18.14	3	–2
Citizens–Party of the Citizenry (Cs)	177,691	19.37	+3.54	2	±0
United We Can (Podemos–EUPV)^{1}	127,615	13.91	–8.17	2	–1
Vox (Vox)	115,249	12.56	+12.33	1	+1
Commitment: Bloc–Initiative–Greens Equo (Compromís 2019)	31,030	3.38	New	0	±0
Animalist Party Against Mistreatment of Animals (PACMA)	12,982	1.41	+0.20	0	±0
The Eco-pacifist Greens–Forward (Avant/Adelante–LVEP)^{2}	3,183	0.35	+0.01	0	±0
Zero Cuts–Green Group (Recortes Cero–GV)	1,527	0.17	+0.02	0	±0
Communist Party of the Peoples of Spain (PCPE)	1,345	0.15	–0.03	0	±0
Republican Left of the Valencian Country (ERPV)	1,221	0.13	New	0	±0
Libertarian Party (P–LIB)	973	0.11	+0.06	0	±0
Blank ballots	6,222	0.68	+0.13		
Total	917,498			12	±0
Valid votes	917,498	98.91	–0.25		
Invalid votes	10,154	1.09	+0.25		
Votes cast / turnout	927,652	72.88	+2.46		
Abstentions	345,276	27.12	–2.46		
Registered voters	1,272,928				
Sources
Footnotes: ^{1} United We Can results are compared to The Valencian Way totals in the 2016 election.; ^{2} The Eco-pacifist Greens–Forward results are compared to The Eco-pacifist Greens totals in the 2016 election.

=== 2016 ===
Summary of the 26 June 2016 Congress of Deputies election results in Alicante
Parties and alliances	Popular vote			Seats	
Parties and alliances	Votes	%	±pp	Total	+/−
People's Party (PP)	329,628	37.66	+4.84	5	+1
The Valencian Way (Podemos–Compromís–EUPV)^{1}	193,263	22.08	–3.88	3	±0
Spanish Socialist Workers' Party (PSOE)	187,484	21.42	+0.57	2	–1
Citizens–Party of the Citizenry (C's)	138,517	15.83	–1.23	2	±0
Animalist Party Against Mistreatment of Animals (PACMA)	10,632	1.21	+0.30	0	±0
The Eco-pacifist Greens (Centro Moderado)	3,011	0.34	–0.02	0	±0
Vox (Vox)	2,003	0.23	–0.02	0	±0
Union, Progress and Democracy (UPyD)	1,961	0.22	–0.40	0	±0
Communist Party of the Peoples of Spain (PCPE)	1,582	0.18	–0.01	0	±0
Zero Cuts–Green Group (Recortes Cero–GV)	1,293	0.15	–0.04	0	±0
We Are Valencian (SOMVAL)	554	0.06	+0.02	0	±0
Libertarian Party (P–LIB)	403	0.05	±0.00	0	±0
Blank ballots	4,838	0.55	–0.03		
Total	875,169			12	±0
Valid votes	875,169	99.16	+0.03		
Invalid votes	7,432	0.84	–0.03		
Votes cast / turnout	882,601	70.42	–2.52		
Abstentions	370,695	29.58	+2.52		
Registered voters	1,253,296				
Sources
Footnotes: ^{1} The Valencian Way results are compared to the combined totals of It is Time and United Left of the Valencian Country–Popular Unity in Common in the 2015 election.

=== 2015 ===
Summary of the 20 December 2015 Congress of Deputies election results in Alicante
Parties and alliances	Popular vote			Seats	
Parties and alliances	Votes	%	±pp	Total	+/−
People's Party (PP)	297,083	32.82	–22.39	4	–4
It is Time (Podemos–Compromís)^{1}	201,610	22.27	+19.16	3	+3
Spanish Socialist Workers' Party (PSOE)	188,711	20.85	–6.12	3	–1
Citizens–Party of the Citizenry (C's)	154,397	17.06	New	2	+2
United Left of the Valencian Country–Popular Unity in Common (EUPV–UPeC)	33,397	3.69	–2.81	0	±0
Animalist Party Against Mistreatment of Animals (PACMA)	8,262	0.91	+0.36	0	±0
Union, Progress and Democracy (UPyD)	5,570	0.62	–4.98	0	±0
The Eco-pacifist Greens (Centro Moderado)	3,278	0.36	New	0	±0
Vox (Vox)	2,227	0.25	New	0	±0
Zero Cuts–Green Group (Recortes Cero–GV)	1,761	0.19	New	0	±0
Communist Party of the Peoples of Spain (PCPE)	1,741	0.19	–0.05	0	±0
Valencian Country Now (Ara PV)^{2}	608	0.07	–0.19	0	±0
Democratic Forum (FDEE)	456	0.05	New	0	±0
Libertarian Party (P–LIB)	415	0.05	New	0	±0
We Are Valencian (SOMVAL)	404	0.04	New	0	±0
Blank ballots	5,293	0.58	–0.56		
Total	905,213			12	±0
Valid votes	905,213	99.13	+0.35		
Invalid votes	7,952	0.87	–0.35		
Votes cast / turnout	913,165	72.94	–0.57		
Abstentions	338,776	27.06	+0.57		
Registered voters	1,251,941				
Sources
Footnotes: ^{1} It is Time results are compared to Commitment Coalition–Equo totals in the 2011 election.; ^{2} Valencian Country Now results are compared to Republican Left of the Valencian Country totals in the 2011 election.

=== 2011 ===
Summary of the 20 November 2011 Congress of Deputies election results in Alicante
Parties and alliances	Popular vote			Seats	
Parties and alliances	Votes	%	±pp	Total	+/−
People's Party (PP)	489,946	55.21	+2.78	8	+1
Spanish Socialist Workers' Party (PSOE)	239,318	26.97	–14.15	4	–1
United Left of the Valencian Country–The Greens: Plural Left (EUPV–EV)	57,677	6.50	+4.24	0	±0
Union, Progress and Democracy (UPyD)	49,662	5.60	+4.89	0	±0
Bloc–Initiative–Greens–Equo: Commitment Coalition (Compromís–Q)^{1}	27,619	3.11	+2.39	0	±0
Animalist Party Against Mistreatment of Animals (PACMA)	4,904	0.55	+0.40	0	±0
Republican Left of the Valencian Country (ERPV)	2,301	0.26	+0.05	0	±0
Communist Party of the Peoples of Spain (PCPE)	2,122	0.24	+0.16	0	±0
Humanist Party (PH)	1,782	0.20	+0.17	0	±0
Republicans (RPS)	1,078	0.12	New	0	±0
Communist Unification of Spain (UCE)	894	0.10	New	0	±0
Blank ballots	10,124	1.14	+0.33		
Total	887,427			12	±0
Valid votes	887,427	98.78	–0.59		
Invalid votes	10,975	1.22	+0.59		
Votes cast / turnout	898,402	73.51	–5.23		
Abstentions	323,707	26.49	+5.23		
Registered voters	1,222,109				
Sources
Footnotes: ^{1} Bloc–Initiative–Greens–Equo: Commitment Coalition results are compared to Bloc–Initiative–Greens totals in the 2008 election.

=== 2008 ===
Summary of the 9 March 2008 Congress of Deputies election results in Alicante
Parties and alliances	Popular vote			Seats	
Parties and alliances	Votes	%	±pp	Total	+/−
People's Party (PP)	489,831	52.43	+3.55	7	+1
Spanish Socialist Workers' Party (PSOE)	384,156	41.12	–1.00	5	±0
United and Republican Left (EUPV–IR)	21,087	2.26	–1.65	0	±0
Bloc–Initiative–Greens (Bloc–IdPV–EVEE)	6,711	0.72	–0.11	0	±0
Union, Progress and Democracy (UPyD)	6,614	0.71	New	0	±0
The Greens (EV–LV)^{1}	3,205	0.34	–0.59	0	±0
The Greens–Green Group (LV–GV)	2,263	0.24	New	0	±0
Republican Left of the Valencian Country (esquerra–PV)	1,923	0.21	–0.10	0	±0
Navarrese Cannabis Representation (RCN/NOK)	1,837	0.20	–0.41	0	±0
Anti-Bullfighting Party Against Mistreatment of Animals (PACMA)	1,412	0.15	New	0	±0
Social Democratic Party (PSD)	1,308	0.14	New	0	±0
Spanish Phalanx of the CNSO (FE de las JONS)	933	0.10	+0.05	0	±0
Communist Party of the Peoples of Spain (PCPE)	708	0.08	–0.03	0	±0
Citizens–Party of the Citizenry (C's)	685	0.07	New	0	±0
Spain 2000 (E–2000)	601	0.06	+0.02	0	±0
Citizens for Blank Votes (CenB)	594	0.06	–0.11	0	±0
For a Fairer World (PUM+J)	586	0.06	New	0	±0
Liberal Democratic Centre (CDL)	347	0.04	New	0	±0
Valencian Coalition (CVa)	305	0.03	New	0	±0
Humanist Party (PH)	305	0.03	–0.05	0	±0
Authentic Phalanx (FA)	281	0.03	–0.02	0	±0
Family and Life Party (PFyV)	265	0.03	–0.06	0	±0
Valencian Nationalist Option (ONV)	230	0.02	New	0	±0
Centrist Party (PCTR)	164	0.02	New	0	±0
National Alliance (AN)	148	0.02	New	0	±0
For the Valencian Republic (plRV)	140	0.01	New	0	±0
Spanish Alternative (AES)	139	0.01	New	0	±0
Blank ballots	7,535	0.81	–0.58		
Total	934,313			12	+1
Valid votes	934,313	99.37	±0.00		
Invalid votes	5,878	0.63	±0.00		
Votes cast / turnout	940,191	78.74	+1.22		
Abstentions	253,878	21.26	–1.22		
Registered voters	1,194,069				
Sources
Footnotes: ^{1} The Greens results are compared to The Eco-pacifist Greens totals in the 2004 election.

=== 2004 ===
Summary of the 14 March 2004 Congress of Deputies election results in Alicante
Parties and alliances	Popular vote			Seats	
Parties and alliances	Votes	%	±pp	Total	+/−
People's Party (PP)	434,812	48.88	–5.38	6	–1
Spanish Socialist Workers' Party (PSOE)	374,631	42.12	+7.33	5	+1
United Left–The Agreement+Republican Left (Entesa+IR)	34,774	3.91	–1.43	0	±0
The Eco-pacifist Greens (LVEP)	8,235	0.93	–0.15	0	±0
Valencian Nationalist Bloc–Green Left (Bloc–EV)	7,384	0.83	–0.70	0	±0
Cannabis Party for Legalization and Normalization (PCLyN)	5,463	0.61	New	0	±0
Republican Left of the Valencian Country (ERPV)	2,791	0.31	+0.19	0	±0
Democratic and Social Centre (CDS)	1,694	0.19	+0.08	0	±0
Citizens for Blank Votes (CenB)	1,513	0.17	New	0	±0
Communist Party of the Peoples of Spain (PCPE)	966	0.11	–0.05	0	±0
Family and Life Party (PFyV)	798	0.09	New	0	±0
National Democracy (DN)	782	0.09	New	0	±0
Humanist Party (PH)	674	0.08	+0.02	0	±0
Spanish Phalanx of the CNSO (FE de las JONS)^{1}	477	0.05	+0.01	0	±0
Authentic Phalanx (FA)	462	0.05	New	0	±0
Spain 2000 (E–2000)	383	0.04	–0.07	0	±0
Spanish Democratic Party (PADE)	341	0.04	–0.07	0	±0
The Phalanx (FE)	299	0.03	–0.05	0	±0
Republican Party (PRF)	289	0.03	New	0	±0
Liberal Centrist Union (UCL)	248	0.03	New	0	±0
Republican Social Movement (MSR)	164	0.02	New	0	±0
Blank ballots	12,342	1.39	+0.23		
Total	889,522			11	±0
Valid votes	889,522	99.37	+0.03		
Invalid votes	5,601	0.63	–0.03		
Votes cast / turnout	895,123	77.52	+4.18		
Abstentions	259,606	22.48	–4.18		
Registered voters	1,154,729				
Sources
Footnotes: ^{1} Spanish Phalanx of the CNSO results are compared to Independent Spanish Phalanx–Phalanx 2000 totals in the 2000 election.

=== 2000 ===
Summary of the 12 March 2000 Congress of Deputies election results in Alicante
Parties and alliances	Popular vote			Seats	
Parties and alliances	Votes	%	±pp	Total	+/−
People's Party (PP)	436,740	54.26	+8.57	7	+2
Spanish Socialist Workers' Party–Progressives (PSOE–p)	280,085	34.79	–5.26	4	–1
United Left of the Valencian Country (EUPV)	42,998	5.34	–5.27	0	–1
Valencian Nationalist Bloc–The Greens–Valencians for Change (BNV–EV)^{1}	12,353	1.53	+0.06	0	±0
The Eco-pacifist Greens (LVEP)	8,671	1.08	New	0	±0
Liberal Independent Group (GIL)	2,727	0.34	New	0	±0
Valencian Union (UV)	2,392	0.30	–0.21	0	±0
Communist Party of the Peoples of Spain (PCPE)	1,266	0.16	–0.06	0	±0
Front for the Valencian Country–Republican Left of Catalonia (Front–ERC)	973	0.12	±0.00	0	±0
Internationalist Socialist Workers' Party (POSI)	968	0.12	New	0	±0
Centrist Union–Democratic and Social Centre (UC–CDS)	913	0.11	–0.04	0	±0
Spanish Democratic Party (PADE)	909	0.11	New	0	±0
Spain 2000 Platform (ES2000)	886	0.11	New	0	±0
Self-employed Spanish Party (PEDA)	774	0.10	New	0	±0
The Phalanx (FE)	650	0.08	New	0	±0
Humanist Party (PH)	496	0.06	+0.02	0	±0
Independent Initiative (II)	425	0.05	New	0	±0
Natural Law Party (PLN)	360	0.04	New	0	±0
Independent Spanish Phalanx–Phalanx 2000 (FEI–FE 2000)	325	0.04	New	0	±0
Republican Action (AR)	318	0.04	+0.01	0	±0
Valencian Nationalist Left (ENV)	228	0.03	±0.00	0	±0
Catalan State (EC)	192	0.02	New	0	±0
Blank ballots	9,319	1.16	+0.32		
Total	804,968			11	±0
Valid votes	804,968	99.34	–0.10		
Invalid votes	5,378	0.66	+0.10		
Votes cast / turnout	810,346	73.34	–8.53		
Abstentions	294,594	26.66	+8.53		
Registered voters	1,104,940				
Sources
Footnotes: ^{1} Valencian Nationalist Bloc–The Greens–Valencians for Change results are compared to the combined totals of Valencian People's Union–Nationalist Bloc and The Greens of the Valencian Country in the 1996 election.

=== 1996 ===
Summary of the 3 March 1996 Congress of Deputies election results in Alicante
Parties and alliances	Popular vote			Seats	
Parties and alliances	Votes	%	±pp	Total	+/−
People's Party (PP)	382,321	45.69	+2.22	5	±0
Spanish Socialist Workers' Party (PSOE)	335,149	40.05	+0.10	5	+1
United Left of the Valencian Country (EUPV)	88,772	10.61	+0.35	1	±0
The Greens of the Valencian Country (EV)	6,707	0.80	±0.00	0	±0
Valencian People's Union–Nationalist Bloc (UPV–BN)	5,586	0.67	–0.29	0	±0
Valencian Union (UV)	4,292	0.51	–0.04	0	±0
Communist Party of the Peoples of Spain (PCPE)	1,825	0.22	+0.07	0	±0
Centrist Union (UC)	1,239	0.15	–1.79	0	±0
Republican Left of Catalonia (ERC)	1,034	0.12	New	0	±0
Authentic Spanish Phalanx (FEA)	818	0.10	New	0	±0
Alicantine Provincial Union (UPRA)	651	0.08	–0.01	0	±0
Workers' Revolutionary Party (PRT)	473	0.06	New	0	±0
Humanist Party (PH)	370	0.04	+0.01	0	±0
Republican Action (AR)	324	0.04	±0.00	0	±0
Valencian Nationalist Left (ENV)	292	0.03	–0.01	0	±0
Blank ballots	6,997	0.84	+0.31		
Total	836,850			11	+1
Valid votes	836,850	99.44	–0.04		
Invalid votes	4,712	0.56	+0.04		
Votes cast / turnout	841,562	81.87	+0.12		
Abstentions	186,304	18.13	–0.12		
Registered voters	1,027,866				

=== 1993 ===
Summary of the 6 June 1993 Congress of Deputies election results in Alicante
Parties and alliances	Popular vote			Seats	
Parties and alliances	Votes	%	±pp	Total	+/−
People's Party (PP)	340,312	43.47	+14.10	5	+2
Spanish Socialist Workers' Party (PSOE)	312,754	39.95	–3.85	4	–1
United Left of the Valencian Country (EU–PV)	80,339	10.26	+1.30	1	±0
Democratic and Social Centre (CDS)	15,212	1.94	–8.03	0	–1
Valencian People's Union (UPV)	7,488	0.96	–0.09	0	±0
The Greens (LV)^{1}	6,274	0.80	–0.75	0	±0
Valencian Union (UV)	4,328	0.55	–0.05	0	±0
The Ecologists (LE)	2,311	0.30	–0.66	0	±0
Ruiz-Mateos Group–European Democratic Alliance (ARM–ADE)	2,117	0.27	–0.90	0	±0
The Greens of the Alicantine Country (PVPA)	1,375	0.18	New	0	±0
Communist Party of the Peoples of Spain (PCPE)	1,148	0.15	–0.10	0	±0
Health and Ecology in Solidarity (Eco–Verde)	821	0.10	New	0	±0
Spanish Phalanx of the CNSO (FE–JONS)	729	0.09	–0.11	0	±0
Alicantine Democratic Union (UniDA)	715	0.09	New	0	±0
Cantonal Party (PCAN)	685	0.09	New	0	±0
Revolutionary Workers' Party (POR)	522	0.07	New	0	±0
Valencian Nationalist Left (ENV)	327	0.04	–0.01	0	±0
Gray Panthers of Spain (ACI)	294	0.04	New	0	±0
Spanish Democratic Republican Action (ARDE)	292	0.04	New	0	±0
Coalition for a New Socialist Party (CNPS)^{2}	271	0.03	–0.06	0	±0
Humanist Party (PH)	244	0.03	–0.03	0	±0
Natural Law Party (PLN)	200	0.03	New	0	±0
Communist Unification of Spain (UCE)	0	0.00	New	0	±0
Blank ballots	4,163	0.53	+0.03		
Total	782,921			10	±0
Valid votes	782,921	99.48	+0.13		
Invalid votes	4,074	0.52	–0.13		
Votes cast / turnout	786,995	81.75	+7.66		
Abstentions	175,647	18.25	–7.66		
Registered voters	962,642				
Sources
Footnotes: ^{1} The Greens results are compared to The Greens–Green List totals in the 1989 election.; ^{2} Coalition for a New Socialist Party results are compared to Alliance for the Republic totals in the 1989 election.

=== 1989 ===
Summary of the 29 October 1989 Congress of Deputies election results in Alicante
Parties and alliances	Popular vote			Seats	
Parties and alliances	Votes	%	±pp	Total	+/−
Spanish Socialist Workers' Party (PSOE)	290,886	43.80	–5.53	5	–1
People's Party (PP)^{1}	195,031	29.37	–0.16	3	±0
Democratic and Social Centre (CDS)	66,230	9.97	+0.34	1	±0
United Left–United Left of the Valencian Country (IU–EU)	59,491	8.96	+4.05	1	+1
The Greens–Green List (LV–LV)	10,312	1.55	+0.67	0	±0
Ruiz-Mateos Group (Ruiz-Mateos)	7,784	1.17	New	0	±0
Valencian People's Union (UPV)	6,985	1.05	+0.15	0	±0
The Ecologist Greens (LVE)	6,348	0.96	New	0	±0
Valencian Union (UV)	3,960	0.60	+0.32	0	±0
Workers' Party of Spain–Communist Unity (PTE–UC)^{2}	3,162	0.48	–0.47	0	±0
Workers' Socialist Party (PST)	2,420	0.36	–0.07	0	±0
Social Democratic Coalition (CSD)	1,871	0.28	New	0	±0
Communist Party of the Peoples of Spain (PCPE)	1,632	0.25	New	0	±0
Spanish Phalanx of the CNSO (FE–JONS)	1,359	0.20	–0.12	0	±0
Cantonalist Party of the Alicantine Country (Alicantón)	1,041	0.16	New	0	±0
Spanish Vertex Ecological Development Revindication (VERDE)	889	0.13	New	0	±0
Alliance for the Republic (AxR)^{3}	570	0.09	–0.04	0	±0
Humanist Party (PH)	398	0.06	New	0	±0
Valencian Nationalist Left–Valencian Regional Union (ENV–URV)	360	0.05	New	0	±0
Communist Party of Spain (Marxist–Leninist) (PCE (m–l))^{4}	0	0.00	–0.16	0	±0
Blank ballots	3,331	0.50	+0.04		
Total	664,060			10	±0
Valid votes	664,060	99.35	+1.38		
Invalid votes	4,372	0.65	–1.38		
Votes cast / turnout	668,432	74.09	–0.74		
Abstentions	233,805	25.91	+0.74		
Registered voters	902,237				
Sources
Footnotes: ^{1} People's Party results are compared to People's Coalition totals in the 1986 election.; ^{2} Workers' Party of Spain–Communist Unity results are compared to Communists' Unity Board totals in the 1986 election.; ^{3} Alliance for the Republic results are compared to Internationalist Socialist Workers' Party totals in the 1986 election.; ^{4} Communist Party of Spain (Marxist–Leninist) results are compared to Republican Popular Unity totals in the 1986 election.

=== 1986 ===
Summary of the 22 June 1986 Congress of Deputies election results in Alicante
Parties and alliances	Popular vote			Seats	
Parties and alliances	Votes	%	±pp	Total	+/−
Spanish Socialist Workers' Party (PSOE)	314,763	49.33	–4.81	6	±0
People's Coalition (AP–PDP–PL)^{1}	188,399	29.53	+0.51	3	±0
Democratic and Social Centre (CDS)	61,446	9.63	+7.07	1	+1
United Left (IU)^{2}	31,340	4.91	+0.84	0	±0
Democratic Reformist Party (PRD)	11,407	1.79	New	0	±0
Communists' Unity Board (MUC)	6,031	0.95	New	0	±0
Valencian People's Union (UPV)	5,735	0.90	+0.53	0	±0
The Greens (LV)	5,638	0.88	New	0	±0
Workers' Socialist Party (PST)	2,730	0.43	–0.13	0	±0
Spanish Phalanx of the CNSO (FE–JONS)	2,071	0.32	+0.32	0	±0
Valencian Union (UV)	1,786	0.28	New	0	±0
Communist Unification of Spain (UCE)	1,351	0.21	+0.10	0	±0
Republican Popular Unity (UPR)^{3}	1,038	0.16	+0.09	0	±0
Internationalist Socialist Workers' Party (POSI)	827	0.13	New	0	±0
Party of the Communists of Catalonia (PCC)	533	0.08	New	0	±0
Blank ballots	2,954	0.46	+0.01		
Total	638,049			10	+1
Valid votes	638,049	97.97	+0.05		
Invalid votes	13,226	2.03	–0.05		
Votes cast / turnout	651,275	74.83	–9.62		
Abstentions	219,072	25.17	+9.62		
Registered voters	870,347				
Sources
Footnotes: ^{1} People's Coalition results are compared to People's Alliance–People's Democratic Party–Valencian Union totals in the 1982 election.; ^{2} United Left results are compared to Communist Party of the Valencian Country totals in the 1982 election.; ^{3} Republican Popular Unity results are compared to Communist Party of Spain (Marxist–Leninist) totals in the 1982 election.

=== 1982 ===
Summary of the 28 October 1982 Congress of Deputies election results in Alicante
Parties and alliances	Popular vote			Seats	
Parties and alliances	Votes	%	±pp	Total	+/−
Spanish Socialist Workers' Party (PSOE)	352,632	54.14	+14.76	6	+2
People's Alliance–People's Democratic Party–Valencian Union (AP–PDP–UV)^{1}	189,040	29.02	+23.80	3	+3
Union of the Democratic Centre (UCD)	46,940	7.21	–30.26	0	–4
Communist Party of the Valencian Country (PCE–PV)	26,531	4.07	–7.13	0	–1
Democratic and Social Centre (CDS)	16,680	2.56	New	0	±0
Workers' Socialist Party (PST)	3,656	0.56	New	0	±0
New Force (FN)^{2}	3,461	0.53	–1.41	0	±0
Valencian People's Union (UPV)^{3}	2,414	0.37	New	0	±0
Spanish Communist Workers' Party (PCOE)	1,327	0.20	New	0	±0
United Left of the Valencian Country (EUPV)	1,226	0.19	–0.45	0	±0
Spanish Solidarity (SE)	863	0.13	New	0	±0
Falangist Movement of Spain (MFE)	713	0.11	New	0	±0
Communist Unification of Spain (UCE)	688	0.11	–0.06	0	±0
Communist League–Internationalist Socialist Workers' Coalition (LC (COSI))	636	0.10	New	0	±0
Republican Left (IR)	610	0.09	–0.35	0	±0
Communist Unity Candidacy (CUC)^{4}	602	0.09	–0.55	0	±0
Communist Party of Spain (Marxist–Leninist) (PCE (m–l))	444	0.07	New	0	±0
Spanish Phalanx of the CNSO (FE–JONS)	0	0.00	New	0	±0
Socialist Party (PS)^{5}	0	0.00	–0.94	0	±0
Blank ballots	2,920	0.45	+0.25		
Total	651,383			9	±0
Valid votes	651,383	97.92	–0.87		
Invalid votes	13,805	2.08	+0.87		
Votes cast / turnout	665,188	84.45	+10.96		
Abstentions	122,521	15.55	–10.96		
Registered voters	787,709				
Sources
Footnotes: ^{1} People's Alliance–People's Democratic Party–Valencian Union results are compared to Democratic Coalition totals in the 1979 election.; ^{2} New Force results are compared to National Union totals in the 1979 election.; ^{3} Valencian People's Union results are compared to Nationalist Party of the Valencian Country totals in the 1979 election.; ^{4} Communist Unity Candidacy results are compared to Workers' Communist Party totals in the 1979 election.; ^{5} Socialist Party results are compared to Spanish Socialist Workers' Party (historical) totals in the 1979 election.

=== 1979 ===
Summary of the 1 March 1979 Congress of Deputies election results in Alicante
Parties and alliances	Popular vote			Seats	
Parties and alliances	Votes	%	±pp	Total	+/−
Spanish Socialist Workers' Party (PSOE)^{1}	218,137	39.38	–3.39	4	±0
Union of the Democratic Centre (UCD)	207,570	37.47	+1.58	4	±0
Communist Party of Spain (PCE)	62,018	11.20	+2.01	1	±0
Democratic Coalition (CD)^{2}	28,917	5.22	–1.29	0	±0
National Union (UN)^{3}	10,759	1.94	+1.04	0	±0
Spanish Socialist Workers' Party (historical) (PSOEh)^{4}	5,196	0.94	+0.12	0	±0
Workers' Communist Party (PCT)	3,538	0.64	New	0	±0
Workers' Revolutionary Organization (ORT)^{5}	3,123	0.56	+0.36	0	±0
Left Bloc for National Liberation (BEAN)	2,568	0.46	New	0	±0
Communist Movement–Organization of Communist Left (MCPV–OIC)	2,534	0.46	New	0	±0
Republican Left (IR)	2,439	0.44	New	0	±0
Party of Labour of Spain (PTE)^{6}	1,628	0.29	–0.21	0	±0
Spanish Phalanx of the CNSO (Authentic) (FE–JONS(A))	1,531	0.28	–0.04	0	±0
Revolutionary Communist League (LCR)	1,017	0.18	New	0	±0
Carlist Party (PC)	925	0.17	New	0	±0
Communist Organization–Communist Unification (OCEBR–UCE)	922	0.17	New	0	±0
Blank ballots	1,110	0.20	±0.00		
Total	553,932			9	±0
Valid votes	553,932	98.79	+0.11		
Invalid votes	6,782	1.21	–0.11		
Votes cast / turnout	560,714	73.49	–8.70		
Abstentions	202,268	26.51	+8.70		
Registered voters	762,982				
Sources
Footnotes: ^{1} Spanish Socialist Workers' Party results are compared to the combined totals of Spanish Socialist Workers' Party and People's Socialist Party–Socialist Unity in the 1977 election.; ^{2} Democratic Coalition results are compared to People's Alliance totals in the 1977 election.; ^{3} National Union results are compared to the combined totals of National Alliance July 18 and José Antonio Circles in the 1977 election.; ^{4} Spanish Socialist Workers' Party (historical) results are compared to Democratic Socialist Alliance totals in the 1977 election.; ^{5} Workers' Revolutionary Organization results are compared to Workers' Electoral Group totals in the 1977 election.; ^{6} Party of Labour of Spain results are compared to Democratic Left Front totals in the 1977 election.

=== 1977 ===
Summary of the 15 June 1977 Congress of Deputies election results in Alicante
Parties and alliances	Popular vote			Seats	
Parties and alliances	Votes	%	±pp	Total	+/−
Spanish Socialist Workers' Party (PSOE)	213,242	38.83	n/a	4	n/a
Union of the Democratic Centre (UCD)	197,100	35.89	n/a	4	n/a
Communist Party of Spain (PCE)	50,444	9.19	n/a	1	n/a
People's Alliance (AP)	35,755	6.51	n/a	0	n/a
People's Socialist Party–Socialist Unity (PSP–US)	21,621	3.94	n/a	0	n/a
Christian Democratic Team of the Spanish State (FDC–UDPV)	8,160	1.49	n/a	0	n/a
Spanish Social Reform (RSE)	5,240	0.95	n/a	0	n/a
Democratic Socialist Alliance (ASDCI)	4,479	0.82	n/a	0	n/a
National Alliance July 18 (AN18)	4,028	0.73	n/a	0	n/a
Democratic Left Front (FDI)	2,726	0.50	n/a	0	n/a
Spanish Phalanx of the CNSO (Authentic) (FE–JONS(A))	1,760	0.32	n/a	0	n/a
Workers' Electoral Group (AET)	1,101	0.20	n/a	0	n/a
José Antonio Circles (CJA)	943	0.17	n/a	0	n/a
Labour Federation (FL)	788	0.14	n/a	0	n/a
Independent Spanish Phalanx (FEI)	726	0.13	n/a	0	n/a
Blank ballots	1,071	0.20	n/a		
Total	549,184			9	n/a
Valid votes	549,184	98.68	n/a		
Invalid votes	7,341	1.32	n/a		
Votes cast / turnout	556,525	82.19	n/a		
Abstentions	120,631	17.81	n/a		
Registered voters	677,156				

== Bibliography ==
- Ley 1/1977, de 4 de enero, para la Reforma Política (Fundamental Law 1/1977). Official State Gazette (in Spanish). 4 January 1977. BOE-A-1977-165.
- Real Decreto-ley 20/1977, de 18 de marzo, sobre Normas Electorales (Royal Decree-Law 20/1977). Official State Gazette (in Spanish). 18 March 1977. BOE-A-1977-7445.
- Constitución Española (Constitution). Official State Gazette (in Spanish). 27 December 1978. BOE-A-1978-31229.
- Ley Orgánica 5/1985, de 19 de junio, del Régimen Electoral General (Organic Law 5/1985). Official State Gazette (in Spanish). 19 June 1985. BOE-A-1985-11672.
- Carreras de Odriozola, Albert; Tafunell Sambola, Xavier (2005) [1989]. Estadísticas históricas de España, siglos XIX-XX (PDF) (in Spanish). Vol. 1 (II ed.). Bilbao: Fundación BBVA. pp. 1072–1097. ISBN 84-96515-00-1. Archived from the original (PDF) on 24 September 2015.
