= Valencia (Congress of Deputies constituency) =

Electoral constituency in Spain

Coordinates: 39°20′N 0°50′W

- Congress of Deputies; Electoral constituency
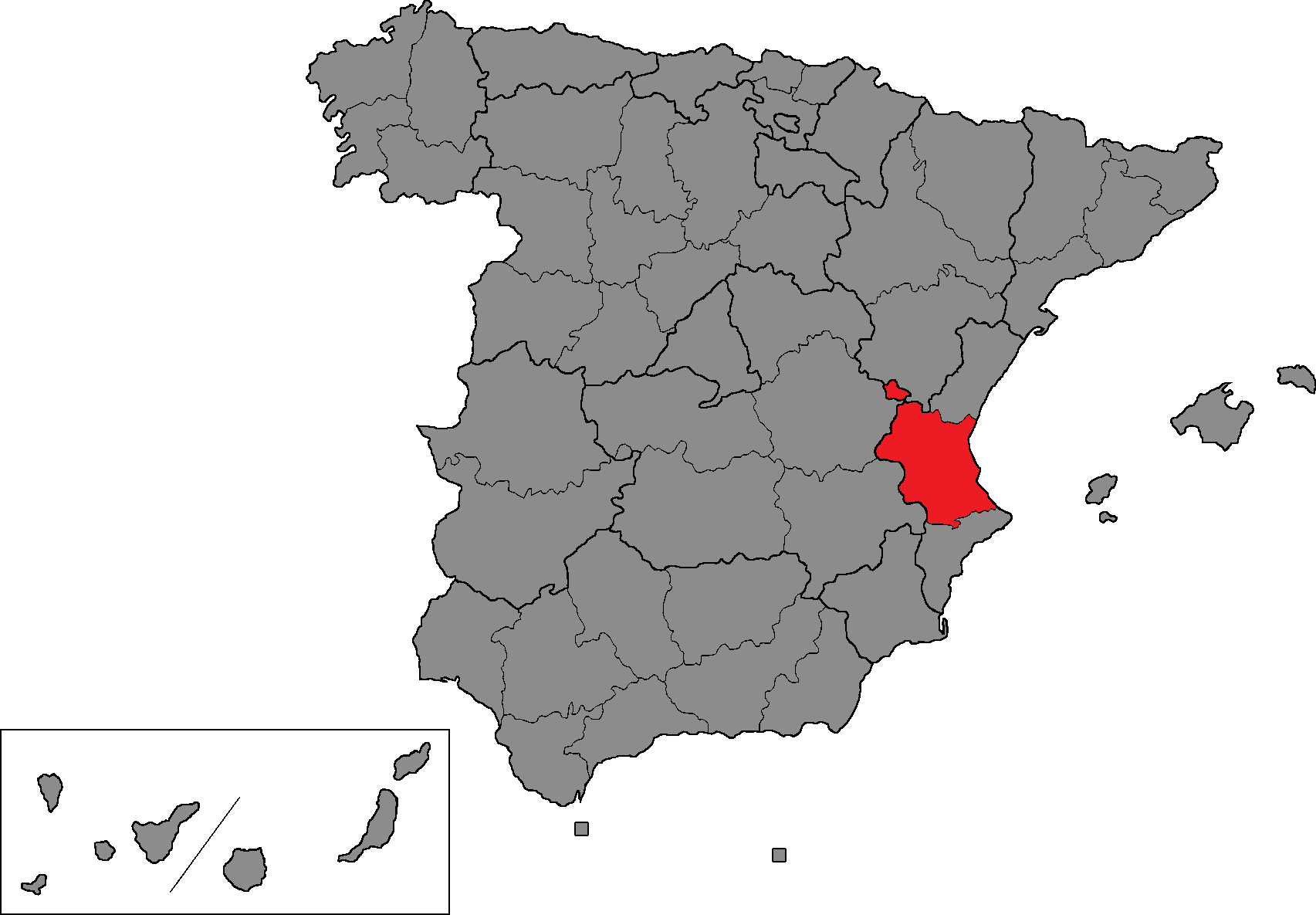
- Location of Valencia within Spain
- Province: Valencia
- Autonomous community: Valencian Community
- Population: ▲2,709,433 (2024)
- Electorate: ▲1,999,340 (2023)
- Major settlements: Valencia, Torrent, Gandía, Paterna, Sagunto

Current constituency
- Created: 1977
- Seats: 15 (1977–1986); 16 (1986–2015); 15 (2015–2016); 16 (2016–2019); 15 (2019–2023); 16 (2023–present)
- Members: PP (6); PSOE (5); SPG (3); Vox (2)

Valencia (Valencian: València) is one of the 52 constituencies represented in the Congress of Deputies, the lower chamber of the Spanish parliament, the Cortes Generales. The constituency (whose boundaries correspond to those of the homonymous province) currently elects 16 deputies. The electoral system uses the D'Hondt method and closed-list proportional voting, with a minimum threshold of three percent.

== Electoral system ==
The constituency was created as per the Political Reform Law and was first contested in the 1977 general election. The Law provided for the provinces of Spain to be established as multi-member districts in the Congress of Deputies, with this regulation being maintained under the Spanish Constitution of 1978. Additionally, the Constitution requires for any modification of the provincial limits to be approved under an organic law, needing an absolute majority in the Cortes Generales.

Voting is based on universal suffrage, comprising all Spanish nationals over 18 years of age with full political rights, provided that they have not been deprived of the right to vote by a final sentence. The only exception was in 1977, when this was limited to nationals over 21 years of age and in full enjoyment of their political and civil rights. Amendments in 2011 required non-resident citizens to apply for voting, a system known as "begged" voting (Spanish: Voto rogado). which was abolished in 2022. Further, amendments in 2018 granted the right to vote to those legally incapacitated. The Congress of Deputies has a minimum of 300 and a maximum of 400 seats, with electoral provisions fixing its size at 350. Of these, 348 are elected in 50 multi-member constituencies corresponding to the provinces of Spain—each of which is assigned an initial minimum of two seats and the remaining 248 distributed in proportion to population—using the D'Hondt method and closed-list proportional voting, with a three percent-threshold of valid votes (including blank ballots) in each constituency. The remaining two seats are allocated to Ceuta and Melilla as single-member districts elected by plurality voting. The use of this electoral method may result in a higher effective threshold depending on district magnitude and vote distribution. The law does not provide for by-elections to fill vacant seats; instead, any vacancies arising after the proclamation of candidates and during the legislative term are filled by the next candidates on the party lists or, when required, by designated substitutes.

The electoral law allows for parties and federations registered in the interior ministry, alliances and groupings of electors to present lists of candidates. Parties and federations intending to form an alliance are required to inform the relevant electoral commission within 10 days of the election call—15 before 1985—whereas groupings of electors need to secure the signature of at least one percent of the electorate in the constituencies for which they seek election—one permille of the electorate, with a compulsory minimum of 500 signatures, until 1985—disallowing electors from signing for more than one list. Also since 2011, parties, federations or alliances that have not obtained a mandate in either chamber of the Cortes at the preceding election are required to secure the signature of at least 0.1 percent of electors in the aforementioned constituencies. Amendments in 2007 required a balanced composition of men and women in the electoral lists, so that candidates of either sex made up at least 40 percent of the total composition; further amendments in 2024 required the use of a zipper system.

== Deputies ==
Deputies 1977–present
Key to parties PCE IU U.Podemos ALV EEM SPG M.Compromís Compromís PSP PSOE UPyD CDS Cs UCD UV PP CP AP Vox
Legislature	Election	Distribution
Constituent	1977	1 / 1 / 7 / 5 / 1
1st	1979	2 / 7 / 6
2nd	1982	10 / 5
3rd	1986	9 / 1 / 1 / 5
4th	1989	1 / 8 / 1 / 2 / 4
5th	1993	2 / 6 / 1 / 7
6th	1996	2 / 6 / 1 / 7
7th	2000	1 / 6 / 9
8th	2004	1 / 7 / 8
9th	2008	7 / 9
10th	2011	1 / 1 / 4 / 1 / 9
11th	2015	5 / 3 / 2 / 5
12th	2016	5 / 3 / 2 / 6
13th	2019 (Apr)	2 / 1 / 4 / 3 / 3 / 2
14th	2019 (Nov)	2 / 1 / 4 / 1 / 4 / 3
15th	2023	3 / 5 / 6 / 2

== General elections ==
=== 2026 ===
Summary of the 29 November 2026 Congress of Deputies election results in Valencia
Parties and alliances	Popular vote			Seats	
Parties and alliances	Votes	%	±pp	Total	+/−
People's Party (PP)					
Spanish Socialist Workers' Party (PSOE)					
Commitment: Valencian Front (Compromís–EUPV–Podem–ERPV)^{1}					
Vox (Vox)					
Animalist Party with the Environment (PACMA)					
Workers' Front (FO)					
For a Fairer World (M+J)					
Spanish Phalanx of the CNSO (FE de las JONS)					
Communist Party of the Workers of Spain (PCTE)			New		
The Party is Over (SALF)			New		
United Valencia (VLC)			New		
Rebirth (RRB)			New		
Valencian Agenda (Agenda Valenciana)			New		
Blank ballots					
Total				16	±0
Valid votes					
Invalid votes					
Votes cast / turnout					
Abstentions					
Registered voters	2,067,797				
Sources
Footnotes: ^{1} Commitment: Valencian Front results are compared to the combined totals of We Unite to Win and Zero Cuts in the 2023 election.

=== 2023 ===
Summary of the 23 July 2023 Congress of Deputies election results in Valencia
Parties and alliances	Popular vote			Seats	
Parties and alliances	Votes	%	±pp	Total	+/−
People's Party (PP)	483,469	33.64	+11.56	6	+2
Spanish Socialist Workers' Party (PSOE)	461,353	32.10	+5.06	5	+1
Commitment–Unite: We Unite to Win (Sumar–Compromís)^{1}	242,839	16.90	–5.71	3	±0
Vox (Vox)	218,657	15.21	–2.48	2	–1
Animalist Party with the Environment (PACMA)^{2}	10,334	0.72	–0.39	0	±0
Workers' Front (FO)	2,919	0.20	New	0	±0
For a Fairer World (PUM+J)	1,778	0.12	+0.05	0	±0
Zero Cuts (Recortes Cero)	1,773	0.12	+0.01	0	±0
Valencian Welfare State (EVB)	1,442	0.10	New	0	±0
Walking Together (CJ)	1,056	0.07	New	0	±0
Spanish Phalanx of the CNSO (FE de las JONS)	731	0.05	New	0	±0
Citizens–Party of the Citizenry (Cs)	n/a	n/a	–7.68	0	–1
Blank ballots	10,810	0.75	–0.03		
Total	1,437,161			16	+1
Valid votes	1,437,161	99.03	–0.10		
Invalid votes	14,026	0.97	+0.10		
Votes cast / turnout	1,451,187	72.58	+1.40		
Abstentions	548,153	27.42	–1.40		
Registered voters	1,999,340				
Sources
Footnotes: ^{1} Commitment–Unite: We Unite to Win results are compared to the combined totals of United We Can and More Commitment in the November 2019 election.; ^{2} Animalist Party with the Environment results are compared to Animalist Party Against Mistreatment of Animals totals in the November 2019 election.

=== November 2019 ===
Summary of the 10 November 2019 Congress of Deputies election results in Valencia
Parties and alliances	Popular vote			Seats	
Parties and alliances	Votes	%	±pp	Total	+/−
Spanish Socialist Workers' Party (PSOE)	375,879	27.04	–0.06	4	±0
People's Party (PP)	306,929	22.08	+4.51	4	+1
Vox (Vox)	245,890	17.69	+6.01	3	+1
United We Can (Podemos–EUPV)	191,812	13.80	–0.72	2	±0
More Commitment (Més Compromís)^{1}	122,535	8.81	+0.15	1	±0
Citizens–Party of the Citizenry (Cs)	106,820	7.68	–9.78	1	–2
Animalist Party Against Mistreatment of Animals (PACMA)	15,395	1.11	–0.33	0	±0
Republican Left of the Valencian Country (ERPV)	3,086	0.22	+0.07	0	±0
The Eco-pacifist Greens–Forward (Avant/Adelante–LVEP)	2,674	0.19	–0.05	0	±0
We Are Valencian in Movement (UiG–Som–CUIDES)	2,339	0.17	–0.14	0	±0
Zero Cuts–Green Group (Recortes Cero–GV)	1,540	0.11	–0.03	0	±0
Communist Party of the Peoples of Spain (PCPE)	1,142	0.08	–0.03	0	±0
United–Acting for Democracy (Unidos SI–ACPS–DEf)	1,067	0.08	New	0	±0
For a Fairer World (PUM+J)	1,009	0.07	New	0	±0
With You, We Are Democracy (Contigo)	875	0.06	New	0	±0
At Once Valencian Community (aUna CV)	468	0.03	New	0	±0
Blank ballots	10,798	0.78	+0.15		
Total	1,390,258			15	±0
Valid votes	1,390,258	99.13	+0.17		
Invalid votes	12,147	0.87	–0.17		
Votes cast / turnout	1,402,405	71.18	–3.74		
Abstentions	567,791	28.82	+3.74		
Registered voters	1,970,196				
Sources
Footnotes: ^{1} More Commitment results are compared to Commitment: Bloc–Initiative–Greens Equo totals in the April 2019 election.

=== April 2019 ===
Summary of the 28 April 2019 Congress of Deputies election results in Valencia
Parties and alliances	Popular vote			Seats	
Parties and alliances	Votes	%	±pp	Total	+/−
Spanish Socialist Workers' Party (PSOE)	394,703	27.10	+6.97	4	+1
People's Party (PP)	255,868	17.57	–16.45	3	–3
Citizens–Party of the Citizenry (Cs)	254,360	17.46	+2.98	3	+1
United We Can (Podemos–EUPV)^{1}	211,527	14.52	–13.25	2	–3
Vox (Vox)	170,070	11.68	+11.44	2	+2
Commitment: Bloc–Initiative–Greens Equo (Compromís 2019)	126,078	8.66	New	1	+1
Animalist Party Against Mistreatment of Animals (PACMA)	20,923	1.44	+0.10	0	±0
We Are Valencian in Movement (UiG–Som–CUIDES)	4,473	0.31	–0.09	0	±0
Forward–The Greens (Avant/Adelante–LV)	3,563	0.24	New	0	±0
Republican Left of the Valencian Country (ERPV)	2,156	0.15	New	0	±0
Zero Cuts–Green Group (Recortes Cero–GV)	2,108	0.14	–0.07	0	±0
Communist Party of the Peoples of Spain (PCPE)	1,542	0.11	±0.00	0	±0
Blank ballots	9,156	0.63	+0.03		
Total	1,456,527			15	–1
Valid votes	1,456,527	98.96	–0.18		
Invalid votes	15,298	1.04	+0.18		
Votes cast / turnout	1,471,825	74.92	+1.34		
Abstentions	492,731	25.08	–1.34		
Registered voters	1,964,556				
Sources
Footnotes: ^{1} United We Can results are compared to The Valencian Way totals in the 2016 election.

=== 2016 ===
← Summary of the 26 June 2016 Congress of Deputies election results in Valencia
Parties and alliances	Popular vote			Seats	
Parties and alliances	Votes	%	±pp	Total	+/−
People's Party (PP)	482,855	34.02	+3.83	6	+1
The Valencian Way (Podemos–Compromís–EUPV)^{1}	394,227	27.77	–4.02	5	±0
Spanish Socialist Workers' Party (PSOE)	285,732	20.13	+1.29	3	±0
Citizens–Party of the Citizenry (C's)	205,489	14.48	–0.65	2	±0
Animalist Party Against Mistreatment of Animals (PACMA)	18,994	1.34	+0.35	0	±0
We Are Valencian (SOMVAL)	5,678	0.40	+0.04	0	±0
Citizens of Democratic Centre (CCD)	4,561	0.32	–0.17	0	±0
Vox (Vox)	3,381	0.24	–0.04	0	±0
Union, Progress and Democracy (UPyD)	2,962	0.21	–0.47	0	±0
Zero Cuts–Green Group (Recortes Cero–GV)	2,944	0.21	+0.02	0	±0
Communist Party of the Peoples of Spain (PCPE)	1,566	0.11	–0.03	0	±0
Spanish Phalanx of the CNSO (FE de las JONS)	1,465	0.10	New	0	±0
Libertarian Party (P–LIB)	589	0.04	New	0	±0
Political Renovation (RePo)	570	0.04	New	0	±0
Blank ballots	8,508	0.60	±0.00		
Total	1,419,521			16	+1
Valid votes	1,419,521	99.14	–0.06		
Invalid votes	12,322	0.86	+0.06		
Votes cast / turnout	1,431,843	73.58	–2.37		
Abstentions	514,203	26.42	+2.37		
Registered voters	1,946,046				
Sources
Footnotes: ^{1} The Valencian Way results are compared to the combined totals of It is Time and United Left of the Valencian Country–Popular Unity in Common in the 2015 election.

=== 2015 ===
Summary of the 20 December 2015 Congress of Deputies election results in Valencia
Parties and alliances	Popular vote			Seats	
Parties and alliances	Votes	%	±pp	Total	+/−
People's Party (PP)	442,578	30.19	–22.05	5	–4
It is Time (Podemos–Compromís)^{1}	397,207	27.09	+21.06	5	+4
Spanish Socialist Workers' Party (PSOE)	276,188	18.84	–7.19	3	–1
Citizens–Party of the Citizenry (C's)	221,896	15.13	New	2	+2
United Left of the Valencian Country–Popular Unity in Common (EUPV–UPeC)	68,961	4.70	–2.07	0	–1
Animalist Party Against Mistreatment of Animals (PACMA)	14,494	0.99	+0.54	0	±0
Union, Progress and Democracy (UPyD)	9,990	0.68	–5.25	0	–1
Citizens of Democratic Centre (CCD)	7,111	0.49	New	0	±0
We Are Valencian (SOMVAL)	5,232	0.36	New	0	±0
Vox (Vox)	4,135	0.28	New	0	±0
Zero Cuts–Green Group (Recortes Cero–GV)	2,761	0.19	New	0	±0
Communist Party of the Peoples of Spain (PCPE)	2,091	0.14	+0.02	0	±0
Valencian Country Now (Ara PV)^{2}	1,482	0.10	–0.16	0	±0
In Positive (En Positiu)	1,276	0.09	New	0	±0
Forward Valencians (Avant)	1,003	0.07	New	0	±0
Feminist Initiative (IFem)	1,002	0.07	New	0	±0
Blank ballots	8,747	0.60	–0.42		
Total	1,466,154			15	–1
Valid votes	1,466,154	99.20	+0.29		
Invalid votes	11,888	0.80	–0.29		
Votes cast / turnout	1,478,042	75.95	+1.04		
Abstentions	468,102	24.05	–1.04		
Registered voters	1,946,144				
Sources
Footnotes: ^{1} It is Time results are compared to Commitment Coalition–Equo totals in the 2011 election.; ^{2} Valencian Country Now results are compared to Republican Left of the Valencian Country totals in the 2011 election.

=== 2011 ===
Summary of the 20 November 2011 Congress of Deputies election results in Valencia
Parties and alliances	Popular vote			Seats	
Parties and alliances	Votes	%	±pp	Total	+/−
People's Party (PP)	743,604	52.24	+0.62	9	±0
Spanish Socialist Workers' Party (PSOE)	370,499	26.03	–14.17	4	–3
United Left of the Valencian Country–The Greens: Plural Left (EUPV–EV)	96,417	6.77	+3.64	1	+1
Bloc–Initiative–Greens–Equo: Commitment Coalition (Compromís–Q)^{1}	85,797	6.03	+4.70	1	+1
Union, Progress and Democracy (UPyD)	84,394	5.93	+5.20	1	+1
Animalist Party Against Mistreatment of Animals (PACMA)	6,381	0.45	+0.30	0	±0
Spain 2000 (E–2000)	5,579	0.39	+0.24	0	±0
Blank Seats (EB)	3,972	0.28	New	0	±0
Republican Left of the Valencian Country (ERPV)	3,648	0.26	+0.02	0	±0
United for Valencia (UxV)^{2}	2,210	0.16	+0.09	0	±0
Communist Party of the Peoples of Spain (PCPE)	1,742	0.12	+0.07	0	±0
Liberal Democratic Centre (CDL)	1,543	0.11	New	0	±0
Humanist Party (PH)	1,221	0.09	+0.06	0	±0
Republicans (RPS)	958	0.07	New	0	±0
Communist Unification of Spain (UCE)	906	0.06	New	0	±0
Blank ballots	14,515	1.02	+0.20		
Total	1,423,386			16	±0
Valid votes	1,423,386	98.91	–0.40		
Invalid votes	15,754	1.09	+0.40		
Votes cast / turnout	1,439,140	74.91	–4.22		
Abstentions	482,018	25.09	+4.22		
Registered voters	1,921,158				
Sources
Footnotes: ^{1} Bloc–Initiative–Greens–Equo: Commitment Coalition results are compared to Bloc–Initiative–Greens totals in the 2008 election.; ^{2} United for Valencia results are compared to Valencian Nationalist Option totals in the 2008 election.

=== 2008 ===
Summary of the 9 March 2008 Congress of Deputies election results in Valencia
Parties and alliances	Popular vote			Seats	
Parties and alliances	Votes	%	±pp	Total	+/−
People's Party (PP)	770,413	51.62	+5.87	9	+1
Spanish Socialist Workers' Party (PSOE)	599,954	40.20	–1.99	7	±0
United and Republican Left (EUPV–IR)	46,683	3.13	–2.27	0	–1
Bloc–Initiative–Greens (Bloc–IdPV–EVEE)	19,826	1.33	–0.53	0	±0
Union, Progress and Democracy (UPyD)	10,890	0.73	New	0	±0
Valencian Coalition (CVa)	4,906	0.33	New	0	±0
The Greens (EV–LV)^{1}	3,869	0.26	–0.50	0	±0
Republican Left of the Valencian Country (esquerra–PV)	3,602	0.24	–0.33	0	±0
The Greens–Green Group (LV–GV)	2,987	0.20	New	0	±0
Navarrese Cannabis Representation (RCN/NOK)	2,489	0.17	–0.49	0	±0
Anti-Bullfighting Party Against Mistreatment of Animals (PACMA)	2,257	0.15	New	0	±0
Spain 2000 (E–2000)	2,220	0.15	+0.04	0	±0
Social Democratic Party (PSD)	1,512	0.10	New	0	±0
Citizens–Party of the Citizenry (C's)	1,177	0.08	New	0	±0
Valencian Nationalist Option (ONV)	1,077	0.07	New	0	±0
For a Fairer World (PUM+J)	1,006	0.07	New	0	±0
Communist Party of the Peoples of Spain (PCPE)	749	0.05	–0.03	0	±0
Citizens for Blank Votes (CenB)	729	0.05	–0.20	0	±0
National Democracy (DN)	525	0.04	–0.02	0	±0
Family and Life Party (PFyV)	511	0.03	–0.11	0	±0
Spanish Phalanx of the CNSO (FE de las JONS)	502	0.03	–0.01	0	±0
Internationalist Socialist Workers' Party (POSI)	478	0.03	–0.02	0	±0
For the Valencian Republic (plRV)	429	0.03	New	0	±0
Humanist Party (PH)	390	0.03	–0.03	0	±0
Kingdom of Valencia Identity (IRV)	387	0.03	–0.12	0	±0
Spanish Alternative (AES)	250	0.02	New	0	±0
Authentic Phalanx (FA)	230	0.02	–0.01	0	±0
National Alliance (AN)	226	0.02	New	0	±0
Blank ballots	12,279	0.82	–0.65		
Total	1,492,553			16	±0
Valid votes	1,492,553	99.31	–0.06		
Invalid votes	10,318	0.69	+0.06		
Votes cast / turnout	1,502,871	79.13	+1.45		
Abstentions	396,392	20.87	–1.45		
Registered voters	1,899,263				
Sources
Footnotes: ^{1} The Greens results are compared to The Eco-pacifist Greens totals in the 2004 election.

=== 2004 ===
Summary of the 14 March 2004 Congress of Deputies election results in Valencia
Parties and alliances	Popular vote			Seats	
Parties and alliances	Votes	%	±pp	Total	+/−
People's Party (PP)	665,526	45.75	–4.72	8	–1
Spanish Socialist Workers' Party (PSOE)	613,833	42.19	+8.96	7	+1
United Left–The Agreement+Republican Left (Entesa+IR)	78,515	5.40	–1.12	1	±0
Valencian Nationalist Bloc–Green Left (Bloc–EV)	27,050	1.86	–1.08	0	±0
The Eco-pacifist Greens (LVEP)	11,127	0.76	–0.09	0	±0
Cannabis Party for Legalization and Normalization (PCLyN)	9,604	0.66	New	0	±0
Republican Left of the Valencian Country (ERPV)	8,293	0.57	+0.46	0	±0
Citizens for Blank Votes (CenB)	3,628	0.25	New	0	±0
Democratic and Social Centre (CDS)	2,539	0.17	+0.11	0	±0
Kingdom of Valencia Identity (IRV)	2,111	0.15	New	0	±0
Family and Life Party (PFyV)	1,991	0.14	New	0	±0
Spain 2000 (E–2000)	1,644	0.11	+0.07	0	±0
Communist Party of the Peoples of Spain (PCPE)	1,111	0.08	–0.04	0	±0
Independent Social Democratic Party of the Valencian Community (PSICV)	1,096	0.08	New	0	±0
Humanist Party (PH)	905	0.06	+0.01	0	±0
National Democracy (DN)	801	0.06	New	0	±0
Internationalist Socialist Workers' Party (POSI)	741	0.05	–0.01	0	±0
Republican Party (PRF)	610	0.04	New	0	±0
Spanish Phalanx of the CNSO (FE de las JONS)^{1}	563	0.04	+0.01	0	±0
The Phalanx (FE)	539	0.04	±0.00	0	±0
Authentic Phalanx (FA)	366	0.03	New	0	±0
Spanish Democratic Party (PADE)	322	0.02	±0.00	0	±0
Republican Social Movement (MSR)	261	0.02	New	0	±0
Spanish Democratic Front (FDE)	242	0.02	New	0	±0
Blank ballots	21,438	1.47	+0.27		
Total	1,454,856			16	±0
Valid votes	1,454,856	99.37	–0.02		
Invalid votes	9,164	0.63	+0.02		
Votes cast / turnout	1,464,020	77.68	+5.01		
Abstentions	420,584	22.32	–5.01		
Registered voters	1,884,604				
Sources
Footnotes: ^{1} Spanish Phalanx of the CNSO results are compared to Independent Spanish Phalanx–Phalanx 2000 totals in the 2000 election.

=== 2000 ===
Summary of the 12 March 2000 Congress of Deputies election results in Valencia
Parties and alliances	Popular vote			Seats	
Parties and alliances	Votes	%	±pp	Total	+/−
People's Party (PP)	677,860	50.47	+8.44	9	+2
Spanish Socialist Workers' Party–Progressives (PSOE–p)	446,333	33.23	–3.75	6	±0
United Left of the Valencian Country (EUPV)	87,633	6.52	–5.57	1	–1
Valencian Union (UV)	51,927	3.87	–1.75	0	–1
Valencian Nationalist Bloc–The Greens–Valencians for Change (BNV–EV)^{1}	39,520	2.94	+1.00	0	±0
The Eco-pacifist Greens (LVEP)	11,438	0.85	New	0	±0
Liberal Independent Group (GIL)	2,049	0.15	New	0	±0
Communist Party of the Peoples of Spain (PCPE)	1,620	0.12	+0.02	0	±0
Front for the Valencian Country–Republican Left of Catalonia (Front–ERC)	1,448	0.11	+0.01	0	±0
Centrist Union–Democratic and Social Centre (UC–CDS)	789	0.06	–0.05	0	±0
Internationalist Socialist Workers' Party (POSI)	766	0.06	New	0	±0
Humanist Party (PH)	718	0.05	+0.02	0	±0
Republican Action (AR)	636	0.05	+0.02	0	±0
Valencian Nationalist Left (ENV)	574	0.04	±0.00	0	±0
The Phalanx (FE)	543	0.04	New	0	±0
Natural Law Party (PLN)	524	0.04	New	0	±0
Spain 2000 Platform (ES2000)	512	0.04	New	0	±0
Independent Spanish Phalanx–Phalanx 2000 (FEI–FE 2000)	459	0.03	New	0	±0
New Force (FN)	343	0.03	New	0	±0
Social and Autonomist Liberal Group (ALAS)	339	0.03	±0.00	0	±0
Spanish Democratic Party (PADE)	262	0.02	New	0	±0
Carlist Party (PC)	236	0.02	New	0	±0
Catalan State (EC)	196	0.01	New	0	±0
Caló Nationalist Party (PNCA)	189	0.01	New	0	±0
Blank ballots	16,128	1.20	+0.43		
Total	1,343,042			16	±0
Valid votes	1,343,042	99.39	–0.15		
Invalid votes	8,177	0.61	+0.15		
Votes cast / turnout	1,351,219	72.12	–9.44		
Abstentions	522,228	27.88	+9.44		
Registered voters	1,873,447				
Sources
Footnotes: ^{1} Valencian Nationalist Bloc–The Greens–Valencians for Change results are compared to the combined totals of Valencian People's Union–Nationalist Bloc and The Greens of the Valencian Country in the 1996 election.

=== 1996 ===
Summary of the 3 March 1996 Congress of Deputies election results in Valencia
Parties and alliances	Popular vote			Seats	
Parties and alliances	Votes	%	±pp	Total	+/−
People's Party (PP)	607,914	42.03	+4.18	7	±0
Spanish Socialist Workers' Party (PSOE)	534,847	36.98	–0.19	6	±0
United Left of the Valencian Country (EUPV)	174,807	12.09	+0.67	2	±0
Valencian Union (UV)	81,350	5.62	–1.91	1	±0
Valencian People's Union–Nationalist Bloc (UPV–BN)	16,850	1.16	–0.84	0	±0
The Greens of the Valencian Country (EV)	11,249	0.78	–0.27	0	±0
Centrist Union (UC)	1,599	0.11	–1.27	0	±0
Republican Left of Catalonia (ERC)	1,420	0.10	New	0	±0
Communist Party of the Peoples of Spain (PCPE)	1,415	0.10	New	0	±0
Authentic Spanish Phalanx (FEA)	621	0.04	New	0	±0
Valencian Nationalist Left (ENV)	574	0.04	–0.03	0	±0
Humanist Party (PH)	486	0.03	±0.00	0	±0
Republican Coalition (CR)^{1}	482	0.03	+0.01	0	±0
Workers' Revolutionary Party (PRT)^{2}	475	0.03	–0.09	0	±0
Alliance for National Unity (AUN)	428	0.03	New	0	±0
Social and Autonomist Liberal Group (ALAS)	402	0.03	New	0	±0
Spanish Autonomous League (LAE)	296	0.02	New	0	±0
Centrists of the Valencian Community (CCV)	0	0.00	New	0	±0
Blank ballots	11,175	0.77	+0.17		
Total	1,446,390			16	±0
Valid votes	1,446,390	99.54	+0.06		
Invalid votes	6,731	0.46	–0.06		
Votes cast / turnout	1,453,121	81.56	–0.25		
Abstentions	328,598	18.44	+0.25		
Registered voters	1,781,719				
Sources
Footnotes: ^{1} Republican Coalition results are compared to Coalition for a New Socialist Party totals in the 1993 election.; ^{2} Workers' Revolutionary Party results are compared to Workers' Socialist Party totals in the 1993 election.

=== 1993 ===
Summary of the 6 June 1993 Congress of Deputies election results in Valencia
Parties and alliances	Popular vote			Seats	
Parties and alliances	Votes	%	±pp	Total	+/−
People's Party (PP)	518,089	37.85	+13.62	7	+3
Spanish Socialist Workers' Party (PSOE)	508,819	37.17	–2.94	6	–2
United Left of the Valencian Country (EU–PV)	156,340	11.42	+1.53	2	+1
Valencian Union (UV)	102,999	7.53	–3.95	1	–1
Valencian People's Union (UPV)	27,429	2.00	–0.29	0	±0
Democratic and Social Centre (CDS)	18,844	1.38	–5.09	0	–1
The Greens (LV)^{1}	14,403	1.05	–0.76	0	±0
The Ecologists (LE)	3,760	0.27	–0.33	0	±0
Ruiz-Mateos Group–European Democratic Alliance (ARM–ADE)	3,111	0.23	–0.70	0	±0
Workers' Socialist Party (PST)	1,631	0.12	–0.14	0	±0
Valencian Nationalist Left (ENV)	1,026	0.07	–0.05	0	±0
Revolutionary Workers' Party (POR)	873	0.06	New	0	±0
Spanish Democratic Republican Action (ARDE)	843	0.06	New	0	±0
Spanish Phalanx of the CNSO (FE–JONS)	652	0.05	–0.07	0	±0
Natural Law Party (PLN)	533	0.04	New	0	±0
Cantonal Party (PCAN)	457	0.03	New	0	±0
Humanist Party (PH)	421	0.03	–0.02	0	±0
Coalition for a New Socialist Party (CNPS)^{2}	339	0.02	–0.05	0	±0
Communist Unification of Spain (UCE)	0	0.00	New	0	±0
Blank ballots	8,144	0.60	+0.10		
Total	1,368,713			16	±0
Valid votes	1,368,713	99.48	–0.07		
Invalid votes	7,124	0.52	+0.07		
Votes cast / turnout	1,375,837	81.81	+6.71		
Abstentions	305,926	18.19	–6.71		
Registered voters	1,681,763				
Sources
Footnotes: ^{1} The Greens results are compared to The Greens–Green List totals in the 1989 election.; ^{2} Coalition for a New Socialist Party results are compared to Alliance for the Republic totals in the 1989 election.

=== 1989 ===
Summary of the 29 October 1989 Congress of Deputies election results in Valencia
Parties and alliances	Popular vote			Seats	
Parties and alliances	Votes	%	±pp	Total	+/−
Spanish Socialist Workers' Party (PSOE)	481,268	40.11	–6.67	8	–1
People's Party (PP)^{1}	290,711	24.23	–3.27	4	–1
Valencian Union (UV)	137,710	11.48	+6.36	2	+1
United Left–United Left of the Valencian Country (IU–EU)	118,706	9.89	+4.80	1	+1
Democratic and Social Centre (CDS)	77,573	6.47	–1.82	1	±0
Valencian People's Union (UPV)	27,515	2.29	–0.13	0	±0
The Greens–Green List (LV–LV)	21,748	1.81	+1.41	0	±0
Ruiz-Mateos Group (Ruiz-Mateos)	11,099	0.93	New	0	±0
Workers' Party of Spain–Communist Unity (PTE–UC)^{2}	7,787	0.65	–1.03	0	±0
The Ecologist Greens (LVE)	7,233	0.60	New	0	±0
Workers' Socialist Party (PST)	3,128	0.26	–0.14	0	±0
Communist Party of the Peoples of Spain (PCPE)	1,869	0.16	New	0	±0
Social Democratic Coalition (CSD)	1,763	0.15	New	0	±0
Valencian Nationalist Left–Valencian Regional Union (ENV–URV)	1,460	0.12	–0.06	0	±0
Spanish Phalanx of the CNSO (FE–JONS)	1,420	0.12	–0.09	0	±0
Green Movement (MV)	1,368	0.11	New	0	±0
Alliance for the Republic (AxR)^{3}	874	0.07	–0.01	0	±0
Humanist Party (PH)	623	0.05	New	0	±0
Communist Party of Spain (Marxist–Leninist) (PCE (m–l))^{4}	0	0.00	–0.13	0	±0
Blank ballots	6,020	0.50	+0.03		
Total	1,199,875			16	±0
Valid votes	1,199,875	99.55	+1.79		
Invalid votes	5,370	0.45	–1.79		
Votes cast / turnout	1,205,245	75.10	–1.85		
Abstentions	399,670	24.90	+1.85		
Registered voters	1,604,915				
Sources
Footnotes: ^{1} People's Party results are compared to People's Coalition totals in the 1986 election.; ^{2} Workers' Party of Spain–Communist Unity results are compared to Communists' Unity Board totals in the 1986 election.; ^{3} Alliance for the Republic results are compared to Internationalist Socialist Workers' Party totals in the 1986 election.; ^{4} Communist Party of Spain (Marxist–Leninist) results are compared to Republican Popular Unity totals in the 1986 election.

=== 1986 ===
Summary of the 22 June 1986 Congress of Deputies election results in Valencia
Parties and alliances	Popular vote			Seats	
Parties and alliances	Votes	%	±pp	Total	+/−
Spanish Socialist Workers' Party (PSOE)	559,426	46.78	–6.54	9	–1
People's Coalition (AP–PDP–PL)^{1}	328,800	27.50	–1.89	5	±0
Democratic and Social Centre (CDS)	99,175	8.29	+5.93	1	+1
Valencian Union (UV)	61,266	5.12	New	1	+1
United Left (IU)^{2}	60,857	5.09	–0.20	0	±0
Valencian People's Union (UPV)	28,973	2.42	+1.20	0	±0
Communists' Unity Board (MUC)	20,095	1.68	New	0	±0
Democratic Reformist Party (PRD)	9,500	0.79	New	0	±0
The Greens (LV)	4,813	0.40	New	0	±0
Workers' Socialist Party (PST)	4,759	0.40	–0.22	0	±0
Spanish Vertex Ecological Development Revindication (VERDE)	3,025	0.25	New	0	±0
Spanish Phalanx of the CNSO (FE–JONS)	2,537	0.21	+0.21	0	±0
Communist Unification of Spain (UCE)	2,159	0.18	+0.07	0	±0
Valencian Nationalist Left (ENV–URV)	2,116	0.18	–0.39	0	±0
Republican Popular Unity (UPR)^{3}	1,596	0.13	+0.04	0	±0
Internationalist Socialist Workers' Party (POSI)	1,014	0.08	New	0	±0
Party of the Communists of Catalonia (PCC)	102	0.01	New	0	±0
Blank ballots	5,637	0.47	+0.09		
Total	1,195,850			16	+1
Valid votes	1,195,850	97.76	+0.02		
Invalid votes	27,403	2.24	–0.02		
Votes cast / turnout	1,223,253	76.95	–6.44		
Abstentions	366,337	23.05	+6.44		
Registered voters	1,589,590				
Sources
Footnotes: ^{1} People's Coalition results are compared to People's Alliance–People's Democratic Party–Valencian Union totals in the 1982 election.; ^{2} United Left results are compared to Communist Party of the Valencian Country totals in the 1982 election.; ^{3} Republican Popular Unity results are compared to Communist Party of Spain (Marxist–Leninist) totals in the 1982 election.

=== 1982 ===
Summary of the 28 October 1982 Congress of Deputies election results in Valencia
Parties and alliances	Popular vote			Seats	
Parties and alliances	Votes	%	±pp	Total	+/−
Spanish Socialist Workers' Party (PSOE)	635,522	53.32	+16.71	10	+3
People's Alliance–People's Democratic Party–Valencian Union (AP–PDP–UV)^{1}	350,281	29.39	+25.03	5	+5
Communist Party of the Valencian Country (PCE–PV)	63,026	5.29	–8.17	0	–2
Union of the Democratic Centre (UCD)	52,768	4.43	–29.34	0	–6
Democratic and Social Centre (CDS)	28,111	2.36	New	0	±0
Valencian People's Union (UPV)^{2}	14,513	1.22	–0.06	0	±0
New Force (FN)^{3}	12,431	1.04	–1.50	0	±0
Workers' Socialist Party (PST)	7,396	0.62	New	0	±0
Valencian Nationalist Left (ENV–URV)^{4}	6,738	0.57	–0.89	0	±0
United Left of the Valencian Country (EUPV)	6,109	0.51	New	0	±0
Spanish Communist Workers' Party (PCOE)	3,579	0.30	New	0	±0
Communist Unity Candidacy (CUC)^{5}	1,468	0.12	–0.50	0	±0
Spanish Solidarity (SE)	1,305	0.11	New	0	±0
Communist Unification of Spain (UCE)	1,284	0.11	–0.06	0	±0
Communist Party of Spain (Marxist–Leninist) (PCE (m–l))	1,057	0.09	New	0	±0
Falangist Movement of Spain (MFE)	916	0.08	New	0	±0
Independent Spanish Phalanx (FEI)	789	0.07	New	0	±0
Communist League–Internationalist Socialist Workers' Coalition (LC (COSI))	0	0.00	New	0	±0
Spanish Phalanx of the CNSO (FE–JONS)	0	0.00	New	0	±0
Socialist Party (PS)^{6}	0	0.00	–1.04	0	±0
Blank ballots	4,552	0.38	+0.07		
Total	1,191,845			15	±0
Valid votes	1,191,845	97.74	–0.98		
Invalid votes	27,549	2.26	+0.98		
Votes cast / turnout	1,219,394	83.39	+8.58		
Abstentions	242,814	16.61	–8.58		
Registered voters	1,462,208				
Sources
Footnotes: ^{1} People's Alliance–People's Democratic Party–Valencian Union results are compared to Democratic Coalition totals in the 1979 election.; ^{2} Valencian People's Union results are compared to Nationalist Party of the Valencian Country totals in the 1979 election.; ^{3} New Force results are compared to National Union totals in the 1979 election.; ^{4} Valencian Nationalist Left results are compared to Valencian Regional Union totals in the 1979 election.; ^{5} Communist Unity Candidacy results are compared to Workers' Communist Party totals in the 1979 election.; ^{6} Socialist Party results are compared to Spanish Socialist Workers' Party (historical) totals in the 1979 election.

=== 1979 ===
Summary of the 1 March 1979 Congress of Deputies election results in Valencia
Parties and alliances	Popular vote			Seats	
Parties and alliances	Votes	%	±pp	Total	+/−
Spanish Socialist Workers' Party (PSOE)^{1}	394,813	36.61	–5.41	7	–1
Union of the Democratic Centre (UCD)	364,175	33.77	+2.78	6	+1
Communist Party of Spain (PCE)	145,141	13.46	+3.63	2	+1
Democratic Coalition (CD)^{2}	47,017	4.36	–1.23	0	–1
National Union (UN)^{3}	27,447	2.54	+1.05	0	±0
Valencian Regional Union (URV)	15,694	1.46	New	0	±0
Nationalist Party of the Valencian Country (PNPV)	13,828	1.28	New	0	±0
Spanish Socialist Workers' Party (historical) (PSOEh)^{4}	11,774	1.09	+0.59	0	±0
Communist Movement–Organization of Communist Left (MCPV–OIC)	8,900	0.83	New	0	±0
Workers' Communist Party (PCT)	6,657	0.62	New	0	±0
Workers' Revolutionary Organization (ORT)^{5}	6,636	0.62	+0.34	0	±0
Republican Left (IR)	6,350	0.59	New	0	±0
Left Bloc for National Liberation (BEAN)	5,992	0.56	New	0	±0
Party of Labour of Spain (PTE)^{6}	5,076	0.47	–0.15	0	±0
Republican Alliance–Valencian Front (IRA–ARDE)	4,119	0.38	New	0	±0
Liberal Party (PL)	2,947	0.27	New	0	±0
Carlist Party (PC)	2,329	0.22	New	0	±0
Spanish Phalanx of the CNSO (Authentic) (FE–JONS(A))	2,324	0.22	–0.05	0	±0
Revolutionary Communist League (LCR)^{7}	2,119	0.20	–0.13	0	±0
Communist Organization–Communist Unification (OCEBR–UCE)	1,832	0.17	New	0	±0
Union for the Freedom of Speech (ULE)	0	0.00	New	0	±0
Blank ballots	3,308	0.31	+0.14		
Total	1,078,478			15	±0
Valid votes	1,078,478	98.72	–0.26		
Invalid votes	13,991	1.28	+0.26		
Votes cast / turnout	1,092,469	74.81	–9.91		
Abstentions	367,815	25.19	+9.91		
Registered voters	1,460,284				
Sources
Footnotes: ^{1} Spanish Socialist Workers' Party results are compared to the combined totals of Spanish Socialist Workers' Party and People's Socialist Party–Socialist Unity in the 1977 election.; ^{2} Democratic Coalition results are compared to People's Alliance totals in the 1977 election.; ^{3} National Union results are compared to the combined totals of National Alliance July 18 and José Antonio Circles in the 1977 election.; ^{4} Spanish Socialist Workers' Party (historical) results are compared to Democratic Socialist Alliance totals in the 1977 election.; ^{5} Workers' Revolutionary Organization results are compared to Workers' Electoral Group totals in the 1977 election.; ^{6} Party of Labour of Spain results are compared to Democratic Left Front totals in the 1977 election.; ^{7} Revolutionary Communist League results are compared to Front for Workers' Unity totals in the 1977 election.

=== 1977 ===
Summary of the 15 June 1977 Congress of Deputies election results in Valencia
Parties and alliances	Popular vote			Seats	
Parties and alliances	Votes	%	±pp	Total	+/−
Spanish Socialist Workers' Party (PSOE)	395,211	36.59	n/a	7	n/a
Union of the Democratic Centre (UCD)	334,705	30.99	n/a	5	n/a
Communist Party of Spain (PCE)	106,133	9.83	n/a	1	n/a
People's Alliance (AP)	60,410	5.59	n/a	1	n/a
People's Socialist Party–Socialist Unity (PSP–US)	58,654	5.43	n/a	1	n/a
Christian Democratic Team of the Spanish State (FDC–UDPV)	34,788	3.22	n/a	0	n/a
Socialist Party of the Valencian Country (PSPV)	27,411	2.54	n/a	0	n/a
National Alliance July 18 (AN18)	14,275	1.32	n/a	0	n/a
National Association for the Study of Current Problems (ANEPA–CP)	12,738	1.18	n/a	0	n/a
Democratic Left Front (FDI)	6,704	0.62	n/a	0	n/a
Democratic Socialist Alliance (ASDCI)	5,434	0.50	n/a	0	n/a
Front for Workers' Unity (FUT)	3,551	0.33	n/a	0	n/a
Spanish Social Reform (RSE)	3,419	0.32	n/a	0	n/a
Workers' Electoral Group (AET)	2,995	0.28	n/a	0	n/a
Spanish Phalanx of the CNSO (Authentic) (FE–JONS(A))	2,937	0.27	n/a	0	n/a
Independent Candidacy (INDEP)	2,737	0.25	n/a	0	n/a
Valencia Socialist Radical Party (PRSV)	2,345	0.22	n/a	0	n/a
José Antonio Circles (CJA)	1,871	0.17	n/a	0	n/a
Labour Federation (FL)	1,843	0.17	n/a	0	n/a
Blank ballots	1,870	0.17	n/a		
Total	1,080,031			15	n/a
Valid votes	1,080,031	98.98	n/a		
Invalid votes	11,168	1.02	n/a		
Votes cast / turnout	1,091,199	84.72	n/a		
Abstentions	196,782	15.28	n/a		
Registered voters	1,287,981				

== Bibliography ==
- Ley 1/1977, de 4 de enero, para la Reforma Política (Fundamental Law 1/1977). Official State Gazette (in Spanish). 4 January 1977. BOE-A-1977-165.
- Real Decreto-ley 20/1977, de 18 de marzo, sobre Normas Electorales (Royal Decree-Law 20/1977). Official State Gazette (in Spanish). 18 March 1977. BOE-A-1977-7445.
- Constitución Española (Constitution). Official State Gazette (in Spanish). 27 December 1978. BOE-A-1978-31229.
- Ley Orgánica 5/1985, de 19 de junio, del Régimen Electoral General (Organic Law 5/1985). Official State Gazette (in Spanish). 19 June 1985. BOE-A-1985-11672.
- Carreras de Odriozola, Albert; Tafunell Sambola, Xavier (2005) [1989]. Estadísticas históricas de España, siglos XIX-XX (PDF) (in Spanish). Vol. 1 (II ed.). Bilbao: Fundación BBVA. pp. 1072–1097. ISBN 84-96515-00-1. Archived from the original (PDF) on 24 September 2015.
