= The Eco-pacifist Greens =

The Eco-pacifist Greens Los Verdes Ecopacifistas
- Founded: 1988
- Ideology: Ecologism; Pacifism

Website
- losverdesecopacifistas.com

The Eco-pacifist Greens (Spanish: Los Verdes Ecopacifistas; LVEP) is an ecologist political party in Spain; it was founded in 1988.
