= Results of the 2011 Spanish Congress election =

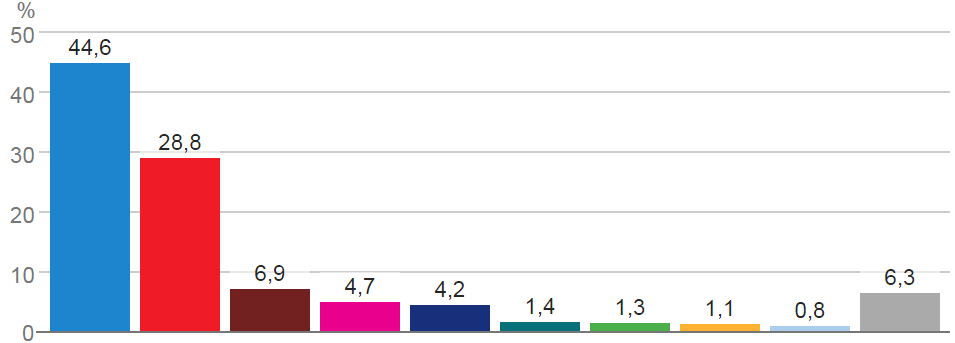
(Spain)	Main: 2011 Spanish general election
← 2008 20 November 2011 2015 →
Party		Votes	%	Seats
	PP	10,866,566	44.6%	186
	PSOE	7,003,511	28.8%	110
	IU–LV	1,686,040	6.9%	11
	UPyD	1,143,225	4.7%	5
	CiU	1,015,691	4.2%	16
	Amaiur	334,498	1.4%	7
	EAJ/PNV	324,317	1.3%	5
	esquerra	256,985	1.1%	3
	BNG	184,037	0.8%	2
	Others	1,534,016	6.3%	5
Total		24,348,886	100.0%	350

This article presents the results breakdown of the election to the Congress of Deputies held in Spain on 20 November 2011. The following tables show detailed results in each of the country's 17 autonomous communities and in the autonomous cities of Ceuta and Melilla, as well as a summary of constituency and regional results.

== Nationwide ==
← Summary of the 20 November 2011 Congress of Deputies election results →
Parties and alliances	Popular vote			Seats	
Parties and alliances	Votes	%	±pp	Total	+/−
People's Party (PP)^{1}	10,866,566	44.63	+4.52	186	+32
Spanish Socialist Workers' Party (PSOE)	7,003,511	28.76	−15.11	110	−59
United Left–The Greens: Plural Left (IU–LV)^{2}	1,686,040	6.92	+3.00	11	+9
Union, Progress and Democracy (UPyD)	1,143,225	4.70	+3.51	5	+4
Convergence and Union (CiU)	1,015,691	4.17	+1.14	16	+6
Amaiur (Amaiur)^{3}	334,498	1.37	+1.05	7	+7
Basque Nationalist Party (EAJ/PNV)	324,317	1.33	+0.14	5	−1
Republican Left (esquerra)	256,985	1.06	−0.10	3	±0
Equo (Equo)	216,748	0.89	New	0	±0
Galician Nationalist Bloc (BNG)	184,037	0.76	−0.07	2	±0
Canarian Coalition–New Canaries (CC–NC–PNC)^{4}	143,881	0.59	−0.24	2	±0
Bloc–Initiative–Greens–Equo: Commitment Coalition (Compromís–Q)^{5}	125,306	0.51	+0.39	1	+1
Animalist Party Against Mistreatment of Animals (PACMA)	102,144	0.42	+0.25	0	±0
Forum of Citizens (FAC)	99,473	0.41	New	1	+1
Blank Seats (EB)	97,673	0.40	+0.38	0	±0
Andalusian Party (PA)^{6}	76,999	0.32	+0.05	0	±0
Platform for Catalonia (PxC)	59,949	0.25	New	0	±0
Regionalist Party of Cantabria (PRC)	44,010	0.18	New	0	±0
Yes to the Future (GBai)^{7}	42,415	0.17	−0.07	1	±0
For a Fairer World (PUM+J)	27,210	0.11	+0.02	0	±0
Communist Party of the Peoples of Spain (PCPE)	26,254	0.11	+0.03	0	±0
Anti-capitalists (Anticapitalistas)	22,289	0.09	New	0	±0
Pirates of Catalonia (Pirata.cat)	21,876	0.09	New	0	±0
Communist Unification of Spain (UCE)	15,869	0.07	New	0	±0
Humanist Party (PH)	10,132	0.04	±0.00	0	±0
Spain 2000 (E–2000)	9,266	0.04	+0.01	0	±0
Internationalist Solidarity and Self-Management (SAIn)	6,863	0.03	+0.01	0	±0
Republicans (RPS)	5,430	0.02	New	0	±0
Hartos.org (Hartos.org)	3,820	0.02	New	0	±0
Pirate Party (Pirata)	3,426	0.01	New	0	±0
Canarian Nationalist Alternative (ANC)	3,180	0.01	+0.01	0	±0
Spanish Phalanx of the CNSO (FE de las JONS)	2,898	0.01	−0.04	0	±0
Liberal Democratic Centre (CDL)	2,848	0.01	±0.00	0	±0
Castilian Party (PCAS)^{8}	2,431	0.01	−0.01	0	±0
United for Valencia (UxV)^{9}	2,210	0.01	±0.00	0	±0
Individual Freedom Party (P–LIB)	2,065	0.01	New	0	±0
Regionalist Party of the Leonese Country (PREPAL)	2,058	0.01	+0.01	0	±0
Internationalist Socialist Workers' Party (POSI)	2,007	0.01	−0.02	0	±0
National Democracy (DN)	1,867	0.01	−0.04	0	±0
Regionalist Party for Eastern Andalusia (PRAO)	1,784	0.01	New	0	±0
Caballas Coalition (Caballas)	1,712	0.01	New	0	±0
XXI Convergence (C.XXI)	1,443	0.01	New	0	±0
Unity of the People (UP)	1,138	0.00	±0.00	0	±0
Convergence for Extremadura (CEx)	1,090	0.00	New	0	±0
Andecha Astur (Andecha)	1,087	0.00	−0.01	0	±0
Citizens of Democratic Centre (CCD)	1,074	0.00	New	0	±0
Citizens' Action for Málaga (ACIMA)	966	0.00	New	0	±0
Family and Life Party (PFyV)	829	0.00	−0.04	0	±0
Death to the System (+MAS+)	791	0.00	New	0	±0
Union of Independent Citizens of Toledo (UCIT)	785	0.00	New	0	±0
Let us Give the Change (DeC)	778	0.00	New	0	±0
Centre and Democracy Forum (CyD)	720	0.00	New	0	±0
Regionalist Unity of Castile and León (URCL)	709	0.00	±0.00	0	±0
Party for the Regeneration of Democracy in Spain (PRDE)	678	0.00	New	0	±0
Internet Party (Internet)	603	0.00	New	0	±0
Left Republican Party–Republicans (PRE–R)	419	0.00	New	0	±0
Enough is Enough, Open Grouping of Political Parties (Basta Ya)	380	0.00	New	0	±0
Constitutional and Democratic Party (PDyC)	304	0.00	New	0	±0
The Greens–Green Group (LV–GV)	293	0.00	−0.12	0	±0
Democratic Hygiene (HD)	206	0.00	New	0	±0
Socialists for Teruel (SxT)	169	0.00	New	0	±0
Navarrese and Spanish Right (DNE)	0	0.00	New	0	±0
Blank ballots	333,461	1.37	+0.26		
Total	24,348,886			350	±0
Valid votes	24,348,886	98.71	−0.65		
Invalid votes	317,555	1.29	+0.65		
Votes cast / turnout	24,666,441	68.94	−4.91		
Abstentions	11,113,050	31.06	+4.91		
Registered voters	35,779,491				
Sources
Footnotes: ^{1} People's Party results are compared to the combined totals of the People's Party, Aragonese Party and United Extremadura in the 2008 election.; ^{2} United Left–The Greens: Plural Left results are compared to the combined totals of United Left and Aragonese Union in the 2008 election.; ^{3} Amaiur results are compared to the combined totals of Basque Solidarity and Aralar in the 2008 election.; ^{4} Canarian Coalition–New Canaries results are compared to the combined totals of Canarian Coalition–Canarian Nationalist Party and New Canaries–Canarian Centre in the 2008 election.; ^{5} Bloc–Initiative–Greens–Equo: Commitment Coalition results are compared to Bloc–Initiative–Greens totals in the 2008 election.; ^{6} Andalusian Party results are compared to Andalusian Coalition totals in the 2008 election.; ^{7} Yes to the Future results are compared to Navarre Yes totals in the 2008 election.; ^{8} Castilian Party results are compared to Commoners' Land totals in the 2008 election.; ^{9} United for Valencia results are compared to Valencian Nationalist Option totals in the 2008 election.

== Summary ==
=== Constituencies ===

Summary of constituency results in the 20 November 2011 Congress of Deputies election
Constituency	PP		PSOE		IU–LV		UPyD		CiU		Amaiur		PNV		esquerra		BNG		CC–NC		Compr.		FAC		GBai	
Constituency	%	S	%	S	%	S	%	S	%	S	%	S	%	S	%	S	%	S	%	S	%	S	%	S	%	S
A Coruña	51.5	5	27.3	2	4.6	−	1.3	−									11.7	1								
Álava	27.2	1	23.4	1	4.1	−	2.8	−			19.1	1	18.8	1												
Albacete	55.1	3	30.1	1	6.2	−	5.0	−																		
Alicante	55.2	8	27.0	4	6.5	−	5.6	−							0.3	−					3.1	−				
Almería	57.6	4	29.9	2	5.3	−	3.9	−																		
Asturias	35.4	3	29.3	3	13.2	1	3.9	−															14.7	1		
Ávila	61.9	2	22.9	1	4.5	−	7.8	−																		
Badajoz	50.6	4	37.6	2	6.0	−	3.5	−																		
Balearic Islands	49.6	5	28.9	3	4.9	−	4.2	−							1.1	−										
Barcelona	20.9	7	27.8	10	9.1	3	1.3	−	27.2	9					6.5	2										
Biscay	17.7	1	21.4	2	3.8	−	1.7	−			19.2	2	32.6	3												
Burgos	54.2	3	28.0	1	5.6	−	7.5	−																		
Cáceres	52.0	2	36.5	2	5.3	−	3.4	−																		
Cádiz	47.1	5	32.8	3	8.7	−	4.8	−																		
Cantabria	52.2	4	25.2	1	3.6	−	3.6	−																		
Castellón	52.8	3	29.6	2	5.3	−	4.0	−							0.5	−					4.0	−				
Ceuta	65.9	1	20.3	−	1.8	−	3.3	−																		
Ciudad Real	55.2	3	32.0	2	5.4	−	4.4	−																		
Córdoba	44.6	3	36.4	3	9.8	−	3.8	−																		
Cuenca	55.9	2	33.0	1	4.8	−	3.6	−																		
Gipuzkoa	13.7	1	21.0	1	3.4	−	1.5	−			34.8	3	22.4	1												
Girona	16.2	1	21.4	1	5.5	−	0.6	−	39.2	3					10.8	1										
Granada	46.7	4	36.5	3	7.9	−	5.2	−																		
Guadalajara	54.0	2	27.7	1	6.8	−	7.5	−																		
Huelva	43.9	3	40.5	2	7.0	−	3.4	−																		
Huesca	48.5	2	33.8	1	8.2	−	4.5	−																		
Jaén	45.4	3	41.0	3	7.0	−	3.4	−																		
La Rioja	54.7	3	31.1	1	4.6	−	6.0	−																		
Las Palmas	51.0	5	26.2	2	4.2	−	2.8	−											11.3	1						
León	52.1	3	34.2	2	5.3	−	4.7	−																		
Lleida	19.4	1	20.3	1	3.9	−	0.6	−	41.3	2					8.6	−										
Lugo	56.1	3	28.3	1	3.1	−	0.9	−									9.2	−								
Madrid	51.0	19	26.0	10	8.0	3	10.3	4															0.2	−		
Málaga	49.7	6	31.6	3	9.0	1	5.6	−																		
Melilla	66.7	1	25.3	−			3.7	−																		
Murcia	64.2	8	21.0	2	5.7	−	6.3	−																		
Navarre	38.2	2	22.0	1	5.5	−	2.1	−			14.9	1													12.8	1
Ourense	56.7	3	28.1	1	2.3	−	0.8	−									9.3	−								
Palencia	55.1	2	31.3	1	5.9	−	4.4	−																		
Pontevedra	50.8	4	28.1	2	4.6	−	1.3	−									12.0	1								
Salamanca	60.0	3	26.2	1	4.3	−	6.2	−																		
Santa Cruz de Tenerife	44.8	4	23.5	2	4.4	−	2.5	−											19.8	1						
Segovia	56.4	2	26.8	1	5.7	−	7.4	−																		
Seville	38.7	5	41.7	6	8.6	1	5.5	−																		
Soria	54.9	1	31.4	1	4.7	−	4.3	−																		
Tarragona	23.6	2	26.1	2	5.4	−	1.1	−	30.5	2					7.4	−										
Teruel	51.8	2	32.9	1	7.9	−	3.4	−																		
Toledo	57.3	4	29.2	2	5.8	−	5.0	−																		
Valencia	52.2	9	26.0	4	6.8	1	5.9	1							0.3	−					6.0	1				
Valladolid	52.9	3	29.0	2	7.4	−	7.2	−																		
Zamora	57.8	2	29.7	1	5.2	−	3.9	−																		
Zaragoza	46.9	4	30.8	2	11.5	1	6.4	−																		
Total	44.6	186	28.8	110	6.9	11	4.7	5	4.2	16	1.4	7	1.3	5	1.1	3	0.8	2	0.6	2	0.5	1	0.4	1	0.2	1

=== Regions ===

Summary of regional results in the 20 November 2011 Congress of Deputies election
Region	PP		PSOE		IU–LV		UPyD		CiU		Amaiur		PNV		esquerra		BNG		CC–NC		Compr.		FAC		GBai	
Region	%	S	%	S	%	S	%	S	%	S	%	S	%	S	%	S	%	S	%	S	%	S	%	S	%	S
Andalusia	45.6	33	36.6	25	8.3	2	4.8	−																		
Aragon	47.7	8	31.5	4	10.5	1	5.8	−																		
Asturias	35.4	3	29.3	3	13.2	1	3.9	−															14.7	1		
Balearic Islands	49.6	5	28.9	3	4.9	−	4.2	−							1.1	−										
Basque Country	17.8	3	21.6	4	3.7	−	1.8	−			24.1	6	27.4	5												
Canary Islands	48.0	9	24.9	4	4.3	−	2.6	−											15.5	2						
Cantabria	52.2	4	25.2	1	3.6	−	3.6	−																		
Castile and León	55.4	21	29.2	11	5.6	−	6.1	−																		
Castilla–La Mancha	55.8	14	30.3	7	5.8	−	5.0	−																		
Catalonia	20.7	11	26.7	14	8.1	3	1.1	−	29.3	16					7.1	3										
Ceuta	65.9	1	20.3	−	1.8	−	3.3	−																		
Extremadura	51.2	6	37.2	4	5.7	−	3.5	−																		
Galicia	52.5	15	27.8	6	4.1	−	1.2	−									11.2	2								
La Rioja	54.7	3	31.1	1	4.6	−	6.0	−																		
Madrid	51.0	19	26.0	10	8.0	3	10.3	4															0.2	−		
Melilla	66.7	1	25.3	−			3.7	−																		
Murcia	64.2	8	21.0	2	5.7	−	6.3	−																		
Navarre	38.2	2	22.0	1	5.5	−	2.1	−			14.9	1													12.8	1
Valencian Community	53.3	20	26.8	10	6.5	1	5.6	1							0.3	–					4.8	1				
Total	44.6	186	28.8	110	6.9	11	4.7	5	4.2	16	1.4	7	1.3	5	1.1	3	0.8	2	0.6	2	0.5	1	0.4	1	0.2	1

== Autonomous communities ==
=== Andalusia ===
← Summary of the 20 November 2011 Congress of Deputies election results in Andalusia →
Parties and alliances	Popular vote			Seats	
Parties and alliances	Votes	%	±pp	Total	+/−
People's Party (PP)	1,985,612	45.57	+7.39	33	+8
Spanish Socialist Workers' Party (PSOE)	1,594,893	36.60	−15.33	25	−11
United Left/The Greens–Assembly for Andalusia: Plural Left (IULV–CA)	360,212	8.27	+3.16	2	+2
Union, Progress and Democracy (UPyD)	207,923	4.77	+3.87	0	±0
Andalusian Party (PA)^{1}	76,999	1.77	+0.25	0	±0
Equo (Equo)	35,639	0.82	New	0	±0
Blank Seats (EB)	11,194	0.26	New	0	±0
Animalist Party Against Mistreatment of Animals (PACMA)	7,966	0.18	+0.03	0	±0
Communist Party of the Peoples of Spain (PCPE)	5,556	0.13	+0.05	0	±0
For a Fairer World (PUM+J)	2,969	0.07	−0.02	0	±0
Anti-capitalists (Anticapitalistas)	2,890	0.07	New	0	±0
Communist Unification of Spain (UCE)	1,909	0.04	New	0	±0
Internationalist Solidarity and Self-Management (SAIn)	1,814	0.04	+0.01	0	±0
Regionalist Party for Eastern Andalusia (PRAO)	1,784	0.04	New	0	±0
Spanish Phalanx of the CNSO (FE de las JONS)	1,662	0.04	±0.00	0	±0
Humanist Party (PH)	1,656	0.04	±0.00	0	±0
Citizens' Action for Málaga (ACIMA)	966	0.02	New	0	±0
Hartos.org (Hartos.org)	921	0.02	New	0	±0
National Democracy (DN)	789	0.02	−0.02	0	±0
Internet Party (Internet)	603	0.01	New	0	±0
Let us Give the Change (DeC)	270	0.01	New	0	±0
Republicans (RPS)	249	0.01	New	0	±0
Blank ballots	53,267	1.22	+0.22		
Total	4,357,743			60	−1
Valid votes	4,357,743	98.97	−0.45		
Invalid votes	45,305	1.03	+0.45		
Votes cast / turnout	4,403,048	68.90	−3.87		
Abstentions	1,987,090	31.10	+3.87		
Registered voters	6,390,138				
Sources
Footnotes: ^{1} Andalusian Party results are compared to Andalusian Coalition totals in the 2008 election.

=== Aragon ===
← Summary of the 20 November 2011 Congress of Deputies election results in Aragon →
Parties and alliances	Popular vote			Seats	
Parties and alliances	Votes	%	±pp	Total	+/−
People's Party–Aragonese Party (PP–PAR)^{1}	339,502	47.70	+5.47	8	+3
Spanish Socialist Workers' Party (PSOE)	224,314	31.52	−14.87	4	−4
Aragonese Union–United Left: Plural Left (CHA–IU)^{2}	74,944	10.53	+2.71	1	+1
Union, Progress and Democracy (UPyD)	41,032	5.77	+4.63	0	±0
Equo (Equo)	5,329	0.75	New	0	±0
Animalist Party Against Mistreatment of Animals (PACMA)	3,404	0.48	+0.32	0	±0
Blank Seats (EB)	3,106	0.44	New	0	±0
Communist Party of the Peoples of Spain (PCPE)	1,409	0.20	+0.16	0	±0
For a Fairer World (PUM+J)	1,376	0.19	+0.13	0	±0
Pirate Party (Pirata)	621	0.09	New	0	±0
Communist Unification of Spain (UCE)	570	0.08	New	0	±0
Let us Give the Change (DeC)	508	0.07	New	0	±0
Humanist Party (PH)	463	0.07	+0.05	0	±0
Individual Freedom Party (P–LIB)	410	0.06	New	0	±0
Socialists for Teruel (SxT)	169	0.02	New	0	±0
Blank ballots	14,535	2.04	+0.79		
Total	711,692			13	±0
Valid votes	711,692	98.43	−0.45		
Invalid votes	11,379	1.57	+0.45		
Votes cast / turnout	723,071	70.99	−4.93		
Abstentions	295,439	29.01	+4.93		
Registered voters	1,018,510				
Sources
Footnotes: ^{1} People's Party–Aragonese Party results are compared to the combined totals of the People's Party and Aragonese Party in the 2008 election.; ^{2} Aragonese Union–United Left: Plural Left results are compared to the combined totals of Aragonese Union and United Left in the 2008 election.

=== Asturias ===
← Summary of the 20 November 2011 Congress of Deputies election results in Asturias →
Parties and alliances	Popular vote			Seats	
Parties and alliances	Votes	%	±pp	Total	+/−
People's Party (PP)	223,906	35.40	−6.18	3	−1
Spanish Socialist Workers' Party (PSOE)	185,526	29.34	−17.59	3	−1
Forum of Citizens (FAC)	92,828	14.68	New	1	+1
United Left of Asturias: Plural Left (IU–IX)	83,755	13.24	+6.06	1	+1
Union, Progress and Democracy (UPyD)	24,721	3.91	+2.55	0	±0
Equo (Equo)	4,033	0.64	New	0	±0
Blank Seats (EB)	2,532	0.40	New	0	±0
Animalist Party Against Mistreatment of Animals (PACMA)	2,125	0.34	+0.17	0	±0
Communist Party of the Peoples of Spain (PCPE)	1,202	0.19	+0.05	0	±0
Andecha Astur (Andecha)	1,087	0.17	−0.02	0	±0
Hartos.org (Hartos.org)	867	0.14	New	0	±0
For a Fairer World (PUM+J)	383	0.06	±0.00	0	±0
Democratic and Constitutional Party (PDyC)	304	0.05	New	0	±0
Humanist Party (PH)	284	0.04	+0.02	0	±0
Internationalist Solidarity and Self-Management (SAIn)	282	0.04	±0.00	0	±0
Communist Unification of Spain (UCE)	209	0.03	New	0	±0
Blank ballots	8,392	1.33	+0.09		
Total	632,436			8	±0
Valid votes	632,436	99.03	−0.32		
Invalid votes	6,193	0.97	+0.32		
Votes cast / turnout	638,629	64.57	−6.72		
Abstentions	350,416	35.43	+6.72		
Registered voters	989,045				

=== Balearic Islands ===
← Summary of the 20 November 2011 Congress of Deputies election results in the Balearic Islands →
Parties and alliances	Popular vote			Seats	
Parties and alliances	Votes	%	±pp	Total	+/−
People's Party (PP)	217,327	49.59	+5.62	5	+1
Spanish Socialist Workers' Party (PSOE)	126,512	28.87	−15.36	3	−1
PSM–Initiative Greens–Agreement–Equo (PSM–IV–ExM–eQuo)	31,417	7.17	+1.80	0	±0
United Left of the Balearic Islands: Plural Left (EUIB)	21,668	4.94	+2.10	0	±0
Union, Progress and Democracy (UPyD)	18,525	4.23	+3.57	0	±0
Republican Left (Esquerra)	4,681	1.07	New	0	±0
Blank Seats (EB)	4,271	0.97	New	0	±0
Animalist Party Against Mistreatment of Animals (PACMA)	3,641	0.83	+0.58	0	±0
For a Fairer World (PUM+J)	1,093	0.25	+0.16	0	±0
Family and Life Party (PFyV)	746	0.17	+0.11	0	±0
Communist Unification of Spain (UCE)	450	0.10	New	0	±0
Blank ballots	7,941	1.81	+0.54		
Total	438,272			8	±0
Valid votes	438,272	98.38	−0.77		
Invalid votes	7,216	1.62	+0.77		
Votes cast / turnout	445,488	60.96	−6.61		
Abstentions	285,252	39.04	+6.61		
Registered voters	730,740				

=== Basque Country ===
← Summary of the 20 November 2011 Congress of Deputies election results in the Basque Country →
Parties and alliances	Popular vote			Seats	
Parties and alliances	Votes	%	±pp	Total	+/−
Basque Nationalist Party (EAJ/PNV)	324,317	27.41	+0.30	5	−1
Amaiur (Amaiur)^{1}	285,290	24.11	+16.99	6	+6
Socialist Party of the Basque Country–Basque Country Left (PSE–EE (PSOE))	255,013	21.55	−16.59	4	−5
People's Party (PP)	210,797	17.81	−0.72	3	±0
United Left–The Greens: Plural Left (IU–LV)	43,717	3.69	−0.77	0	±0
Union, Progress and Democracy (UPyD)	21,282	1.80	+0.86	0	±0
Equo (Equo)	15,351	1.30	New	0	±0
Animalist Party Against Mistreatment of Animals (PACMA)	6,446	0.54	+0.16	0	±0
For a Fairer World (PUM+J)	3,486	0.29	+0.04	0	±0
Blank Seats (EB)	2,886	0.24	New	0	±0
Communist Unification of Spain (UCE)	1,239	0.10	New	0	±0
Blank ballots	13,448	1.14	−0.69		
Total	1,183,272			18	±0
Valid votes	1,183,272	98.96	−0.06		
Invalid votes	12,433	1.04	+0.06		
Votes cast / turnout	1,195,705	67.34	+3.31		
Abstentions	579,843	32.66	−3.31		
Registered voters	1,775,548				
Sources
Footnotes: ^{1} Amaiur results are compared to the combined totals of Basque Solidarity and Aralar in the 2008 election.

=== Canary Islands ===
← Summary of the 20 November 2011 Congress of Deputies election results in the Canary Islands →
Parties and alliances	Popular vote			Seats	
Parties and alliances	Votes	%	±pp	Total	+/−
People's Party (PP)	446,118	47.97	+12.97	9	+3
Spanish Socialist Workers' Party (PSOE)	231,086	24.85	−14.72	4	−3
Canarian Coalition–New Canaries (CC–NC–PNC)^{1}	143,881	15.47	−5.83	2	±0
Canarian United Left: Plural Left (IUC)	40,123	4.31	+3.06	0	±0
Union, Progress and Democracy (UPyD)	24,524	2.64	+2.28	0	±0
Equo (Equo)	15,587	1.68	New	0	±0
Animalist Party Against Mistreatment of Animals (PACMA)	4,906	0.53	+0.47	0	±0
Canarian Nationalist Alternative (ANC)	3,180	0.34	+0.24	0	±0
For a Fairer World (PUM+J)	2,672	0.29	+0.20	0	±0
Communist Party of the Peoples of Spain (PCPE)	2,305	0.25	+0.11	0	±0
Unity of the People (UP)	1,138	0.12	+0.05	0	±0
Humanist Party (PH)	1,051	0.11	+0.05	0	±0
Communist Unification of Spain (UCE)	979	0.11	New	0	±0
Internationalist Solidarity and Self-Management (SAIn)	316	0.03	+0.01	0	±0
Blank ballots	12,044	1.30	+0.57		
Total	929,910			15	±0
Valid votes	929,910	98.30	−1.04		
Invalid votes	16,098	1.70	+1.04		
Votes cast / turnout	946,008	59.60	−6.27		
Abstentions	641,287	40.40	+6.27		
Registered voters	1,587,295				
Sources
Footnotes: ^{1} Canarian Coalition–New Canaries results are compared to the combined totals of Canarian Coalition–Canarian Nationalist Party and New Canaries–Canarian Centre in the 2008 election.

=== Cantabria ===
← Summary of the 20 November 2011 Congress of Deputies election results in Cantabria →
Parties and alliances	Popular vote			Seats	
Parties and alliances	Votes	%	±pp	Total	+/−
People's Party (PP)	183,244	52.17	+2.18	4	+1
Spanish Socialist Workers' Party (PSOE)	88,624	25.23	−18.38	1	−1
Regionalist Party of Cantabria (PRC)	44,010	12.53	New	0	±0
Union, Progress and Democracy (UPyD)	12,614	3.59	+2.21	0	±0
United Left of Cantabria: Plural Left (IUC)	12,608	3.59	+1.32	0	±0
Equo (Equo)	2,482	0.71	New	0	±0
Animalist Party Against Mistreatment of Animals (PACMA)	1,232	0.35	+0.16	0	±0
Communist Party of the Peoples of Spain (PCPE)	578	0.16	+0.03	0	±0
Enough is Enough, Open Grouping of Political Parties (Basta Ya)	380	0.11	New	0	±0
Anti-capitalists (Anticapitalistas)	354	0.10	New	0	±0
Republicans (RPS)	277	0.08	New	0	±0
Humanist Party (PH)	275	0.08	+0.03	0	±0
Internationalist Solidarity and Self-Management (SAIn)	269	0.08	+0.02	0	±0
Communist Unification of Spain (UCE)	145	0.04	New	0	±0
Blank ballots	4,157	1.18	−0.05		
Total	351,249			5	±0
Valid votes	351,249	98.86	−0.35		
Invalid votes	4,040	1.14	+0.35		
Votes cast / turnout	355,289	71.56	−4.82		
Abstentions	141,194	28.44	+4.82		
Registered voters	496,483				

=== Castile and León ===
← Summary of the 20 November 2011 Congress of Deputies election results in Castile and León →
Parties and alliances	Popular vote			Seats	
Parties and alliances	Votes	%	±pp	Total	+/−
People's Party (PP)	843,110	55.37	+5.36	21	+3
Spanish Socialist Workers' Party (PSOE)	444,451	29.19	−13.59	11	−3
Union, Progress and Democracy (UPyD)	93,197	6.12	+4.59	0	±0
United Left of Castile and León: Plural Left (IUCyL)	85,814	5.64	+3.13	0	±0
Equo (Equo)	10,166	0.67	New	0	±0
Animalist Party Against Mistreatment of Animals (PACMA)	5,436	0.36	+0.21	0	±0
For a Fairer World (PUM+J)	2,767	0.18	+0.09	0	±0
Party of Castile and León (PCAL)^{1}	2,080	0.14	−0.07	0	±0
Regionalist Party of the Leonese Country (PREPAL)	2,058	0.14	+0.08	0	±0
Blank Seats (EB)	1,335	0.09	New	0	±0
Spanish Phalanx of the CNSO (FE de las JONS)	1,236	0.08	+0.01	0	±0
Internationalist Solidarity and Self-Management (SAIn)	887	0.06	+0.03	0	±0
Communist Party of the Peoples of Spain (PCPE)	882	0.06	−0.02	0	±0
Communist Unification of Spain (UCE)	795	0.05	New	0	±0
Regionalist Unity of Castile and León (URCL)	709	0.05	+0.02	0	±0
Anti-capitalists (Anticapitalistas)	707	0.05	New	0	±0
National Democracy (DN)	607	0.04	−0.04	0	±0
Citizens of Democratic Centre (CCD)	506	0.03	New	0	±0
Democratic Hygiene (HD)	206	0.01	New	0	±0
Republicans (RPS)	200	0.01	New	0	±0
Hartos.org (Hartos.org)	174	0.01	New	0	±0
Family and Life Party (PFyV)	83	0.01	±0.00	0	±0
Blank ballots	25,201	1.66	+0.46		
Total	1,522,607			32	±0
Valid votes	1,522,607	98.57	−0.70		
Invalid votes	22,136	1.43	+0.70		
Votes cast / turnout	1,544,743	71.29	−6.37		
Abstentions	622,114	28.71	+6.37		
Registered voters	2,166,857				
Sources
Footnotes: ^{1} Party of Castile and León results are compared to Commoners' Land totals in the 2008 election.

=== Castilla–La Mancha ===
← Summary of the 20 November 2011 Congress of Deputies election results in Castilla–La Mancha →
Parties and alliances	Popular vote			Seats	
Parties and alliances	Votes	%	±pp	Total	+/−
People's Party (PP)	654,546	55.81	+6.45	14	+2
Spanish Socialist Workers' Party (PSOE)	355,806	30.34	−14.17	7	−2
United Left of Castilla–La Mancha–The Greens: Plural Left (IUCLM–LV)	67,817	5.78	+2.85	0	±0
Union, Progress and Democracy (UPyD)	58,224	4.96	+3.87	0	±0
Equo (Equo)	7,847	0.67	New	0	±0
Animalist Party Against Mistreatment of Animals (PACMA)	4,156	0.35	+0.26	0	±0
Blank Seats (EB)	2,876	0.25	New	0	±0
Communist Party of the Peoples of Spain (PCPE)	1,438	0.12	+0.06	0	±0
For a Fairer World (PUM+J)	1,135	0.10	+0.02	0	±0
Hartos.org (Hartos.org)	789	0.07	New	0	±0
Union of Independent Citizens of Toledo (UCIT)	785	0.07	New	0	±0
Citizens of Democratic Centre (CCD)	568	0.05	New	0	±0
National Democracy (DN)	471	0.04	±0.00	0	±0
Communist Unification of Spain (UCE)	446	0.04	New	0	±0
Castilian Party (PCAS)^{1}	351	0.03	−0.02	0	±0
Anti-capitalists (Anticapitalistas)	194	0.02	New	0	±0
Centre and Democracy Forum (CyD)	192	0.02	New	0	±0
Liberal Democratic Centre (CDL)	178	0.02	New	0	±0
Blank ballots	15,033	1.28	+0.31		
Total	1,172,852			21	±0
Valid votes	1,172,852	98.51	−0.75		
Invalid votes	17,718	1.49	+0.75		
Votes cast / turnout	1,190,570	75.76	−4.26		
Abstentions	380,928	24.24	+4.26		
Registered voters	1,571,498				
Sources
Footnotes: ^{1} Castilian Party results are compared to Commoners' Land totals in the 2008 election.

=== Catalonia ===
← Summary of the 20 November 2011 Congress of Deputies election results in Catalonia →
Parties and alliances	Popular vote			Seats	
Parties and alliances	Votes	%	±pp	Total	+/−
Convergence and Union (CiU)	1,015,691	29.35	+8.42	16	+6
Socialists' Party of Catalonia (PSC–PSOE)	922,547	26.66	−18.73	14	−11
People's Party (PP)	716,371	20.70	+4.30	11	+3
Initiative for Catalonia Greens–United and Alternative Left: Plural L. (ICV–EUiA)	280,152	8.09	+3.17	3	+2
Republican Left of Catalonia–Rally–Catalonia Yes (ERC–RI.cat)	244,854	7.07	−0.76	3	±0
Platform for Catalonia (PxC)	59,949	1.73	New	0	±0
Blank Seats (EB)	50,879	1.47	+1.33	0	±0
Union, Progress and Democracy (UPyD)	39,650	1.15	+0.98	0	±0
Animalist Party Against Mistreatment of Animals (PACMA)	23,826	0.69	+0.40	0	±0
Pirates of Catalonia (Pirata.cat)	21,876	0.63	New	0	±0
Anti-capitalists (Anticapitalistas)	13,876	0.40	New	0	±0
Communist Unification of Spain (UCE)	3,904	0.11	New	0	±0
Communist Party of the Catalan People (PCPC)	1,547	0.04	−0.07	0	±0
Hartos.org (Hartos.org)	1,069	0.03	New	0	±0
Left Republican Party–Republicans (PRE–R)	419	0.01	New	0	±0
For a Fairer World (PUM+J)	366	0.01	−0.05	0	±0
Blank ballots	63,884	1.85	+0.31		
Total	3,460,860			47	±0
Valid votes	3,460,860	98.42	−1.05		
Invalid votes	55,450	1.58	+1.05		
Votes cast / turnout	3,516,310	65.16	−5.14		
Abstentions	1,880,031	34.84	+5.14		
Registered voters	5,396,341				

=== Extremadura ===
← Summary of the 20 November 2011 Congress of Deputies election results in Extremadura →
Parties and alliances	Popular vote			Seats	
Parties and alliances	Votes	%	±pp	Total	+/−
People's Party–United Extremadura (PP–EU)^{1}	339,237	51.18	+9.03	6	+1
Spanish Socialist Workers' Party (PSOE)	246,514	37.19	−15.10	4	−1
United Left–Greens–Independent Socialists: Plural Left (IU–V–SIEx)	37,766	5.70	+2.75	0	±0
Union, Progress and Democracy (UPyD)	22,913	3.46	+2.69	0	±0
Equo (Equo)	3,496	0.53	New	0	±0
Animalist Party Against Mistreatment of Animals (PACMA)	2,257	0.34	+0.22	0	±0
For a Fairer World (PUM+J)	1,530	0.23	+0.09	0	±0
Convergence for Extremadura (CEx)	1,090	0.16	New	0	±0
Communist Unification of Spain (UCE)	256	0.04	New	0	±0
Blank ballots	7,773	1.17	+0.34		
Total	662,832			10	±0
Valid votes	662,832	98.59	−0.72		
Invalid votes	9,469	1.41	+0.72		
Votes cast / turnout	672,301	73.91	−4.64		
Abstentions	237,264	26.09	+4.64		
Registered voters	909,565				
Sources
Footnotes: ^{1} People's Party–United Extremadura results are compared to the combined totals of the People's Party and United Extremadura in the 2008 election.

=== Galicia ===
← Summary of the 20 November 2011 Congress of Deputies election results in Galicia →
Parties and alliances	Popular vote			Seats	
Parties and alliances	Votes	%	±pp	Total	+/−
People's Party (PP)	864,567	52.53	+8.67	15	+4
Socialists' Party of Galicia (PSdeG–PSOE)	457,633	27.81	−12.83	6	−4
Galician Nationalist Bloc (BNG)	184,037	11.18	−0.33	2	±0
United Left–The Greens: Plural Left (EU–V)	67,751	4.12	+2.75	0	±0
Union, Progress and Democracy (UPyD)	19,969	1.21	+0.66	0	±0
Equo (Equo)	10,059	0.61	New	0	±0
Animalist Party Against Mistreatment of Animals (PACMA)	7,374	0.45	+0.30	0	±0
For a Fairer World (PUM+J)	1,895	0.12	±0.00	0	±0
Communist Party of the Peoples of Spain (PCPE)	1,585	0.10	−0.07	0	±0
XXI Convergence (C.XXI)	1,443	0.09	New	0	±0
Communist Unification of Spain (UCE)	1,200	0.07	New	0	±0
Internationalist Solidarity and Self-Management (SAIn)	884	0.05	+0.03	0	±0
Humanist Party (PH)	694	0.04	−0.02	0	±0
Blank ballots	26,726	1.62	+0.58		
Total	1,645,817			23	±0
Valid votes	1,645,817	98.38	−0.91		
Invalid votes	27,024	1.62	+0.91		
Votes cast / turnout	1,672,841	62.21	−8.27		
Abstentions	1,015,975	37.79	+8.27		
Registered voters	2,688,816				

=== La Rioja ===
← Summary of the 20 November 2011 Congress of Deputies election results in La Rioja →
Parties and alliances	Popular vote			Seats	
Parties and alliances	Votes	%	±pp	Total	+/−
People's Party (PP)	95,124	54.70	+5.19	3	+1
Spanish Socialist Workers' Party (PSOE)	54,066	31.09	−12.54	1	−1
Union, Progress and Democracy (UPyD)	10,367	5.96	+4.68	0	±0
United Left: Plural Left (IU)	7,995	4.60	+2.66	0	±0
Equo (Equo)	1,626	0.93	New	0	±0
Animalist Party Against Mistreatment of Animals (PACMA)	779	0.45	New	0	±0
For a Fairer World (PUM+J)	686	0.39	+0.27	0	±0
Communist Party of the Peoples of Spain (PCPE)	380	0.22	+0.14	0	±0
Communist Unification of Spain (UCE)	94	0.05	New	0	±0
Blank ballots	2,793	1.61	+0.51		
Total	173,910			4	±0
Valid votes	173,910	98.42	−0.88		
Invalid votes	2,797	1.58	+0.88		
Votes cast / turnout	176,707	72.78	−6.51		
Abstentions	66,093	27.22	+6.51		
Registered voters	242,800				

=== Madrid ===
← Summary of the 20 November 2011 Congress of Deputies election results in Madrid →
Parties and alliances	Popular vote			Seats	
Parties and alliances	Votes	%	±pp	Total	+/−
People's Party (PP)	1,719,709	50.97	+1.78	19	+1
Spanish Socialist Workers' Party (PSOE)	878,724	26.05	−13.63	10	−5
Union, Progress and Democracy (UPyD)	347,354	10.30	+6.56	4	+3
United Left–The Greens: Plural Left (IU–LV)	271,209	8.04	+3.38	3	+2
Equo (Equo)	65,169	1.93	New	0	±0
Animalist Party Against Mistreatment of Animals (PACMA)	13,136	0.39	+0.26	0	±0
Blank Seats (EB)	12,877	0.38	New	0	±0
Forum of Citizens (FAC)	6,645	0.20	New	0	±0
For a Fairer World (PUM+J)	5,314	0.16	+0.09	0	±0
Anti-capitalists (Anticapitalistas)	4,268	0.13	New	0	±0
Communist Party of the Peoples of Spain (PCPE)	3,815	0.11	+0.05	0	±0
Humanist Party (PH)	2,706	0.08	−0.05	0	±0
Republicans (RPS)	2,183	0.06	New	0	±0
Internationalist Socialist Workers' Party (POSI)	1,723	0.05	+0.01	0	±0
Individual Freedom Party (P–LIB)	1,655	0.05	New	0	±0
Internationalist Solidarity and Self-Management (SAIn)	1,350	0.04	+0.03	0	±0
Communist Unification of Spain (UCE)	875	0.03	New	0	±0
Blank ballots	35,093	1.04	+0.09		
Total	3,373,805			36	+1
Valid votes	3,373,805	98.96	−0.52		
Invalid votes	35,526	1.04	+0.52		
Votes cast / turnout	3,409,331	73.26	−5.82		
Abstentions	1,244,448	26.74	+5.82		
Registered voters	4,653,779				

=== Murcia ===
← Summary of the 20 November 2011 Congress of Deputies election results in Murcia →
Parties and alliances	Popular vote			Seats	
Parties and alliances	Votes	%	±pp	Total	+/−
People's Party (PP)	471,851	64.22	+2.98	8	+1
Spanish Socialist Workers' Party (PSOE)	154,225	20.99	−11.86	2	−1
Union, Progress and Democracy (UPyD)	45,984	6.26	+5.32	0	±0
United Left–Greens of the Region of Murcia: Plural Left (IU–V–RM)	41,896	5.70	+2.76	0	±0
Equo (Equo)	4,464	0.61	New	0	±0
Animalist Party Against Mistreatment of Animals (PACMA)	2,629	0.36	+0.21	0	±0
Blank Seats (EB)	1,745	0.24	New	0	±0
Communist Party of the Peoples of Spain (PCPE)	1,130	0.15	+0.09	0	±0
Liberal Democratic Centre (CDL)	1,127	0.15	+0.05	0	±0
Death to the System (+MAS+)	791	0.11	New	0	±0
Party for the Regeneration of Democracy in Spain (PRDE)	678	0.09	New	0	±0
Centre and Democracy Forum (CyD)	528	0.07	New	0	±0
Republicans (RPS)	485	0.07	New	0	±0
Communist Unification of Spain (UCE)	465	0.06	New	0	±0
Blank ballots	6,688	0.91	+0.17		
Total	734,686			10	±0
Valid votes	734,686	99.07	−0.23		
Invalid votes	6,868	0.93	+0.23		
Votes cast / turnout	741,554	74.11	−5.47		
Abstentions	259,070	25.89	+5.47		
Registered voters	1,000,624				

=== Navarre ===
← Summary of the 20 November 2011 Congress of Deputies election results in Navarre →
Parties and alliances	Popular vote			Seats	
Parties and alliances	Votes	%	±pp	Total	+/−
Navarrese People's Union–People's Party (UPN–PP)	126,516	38.21	−1.01	2	±0
Spanish Socialist Workers' Party (PSOE)	72,892	22.02	−12.74	1	−1
Amaiur (Amaiur)	49,208	14.86	New	1	+1
Yes to the Future (GBai)^{1}	42,415	12.81	−5.58	1	±0
Left: Plural Left (I–E (n))^{2}	18,251	5.51	+2.24	0	±0
Union, Progress and Democracy (UPyD)	6,829	2.06	+1.29	0	±0
Equo (Equo)	3,656	1.10	New	0	±0
Pirate Party (Pirata)	1,804	0.54	New	0	±0
For a Fairer World (PUM+J)	1,393	0.42	+0.25	0	±0
Internationalist Solidarity and Self-Management (SAIn)	1,061	0.32	+0.21	0	±0
Communist Unification of Spain (UCE)	353	0.11	New	0	±0
Navarrese and Spanish Right (DNE)	0	0.00	New	0	±0
Blank ballots	6,707	2.03	+0.56		
Total	331,085			5	±0
Valid votes	331,085	98.41	−0.90		
Invalid votes	5,355	1.59	+0.90		
Votes cast / turnout	336,440	68.91	−3.15		
Abstentions	151,771	31.09	+3.15		
Registered voters	488,211				
Sources
Footnotes: ^{1} Yes to the Future results are compared to Navarre Yes totals in the 2008 election.; ^{2} Left: Plural Left results are compared to United Left of Navarre totals in the 2008 election.

=== Valencian Community ===
← Summary of the 20 November 2011 Congress of Deputies election results in the Valencian Community →
Parties and alliances	Popular vote			Seats	
Parties and alliances	Votes	%	±pp	Total	+/−
People's Party (PP)	1,390,233	53.32	+1.73	20	+1
Spanish Socialist Workers' Party (PSOE)	697,474	26.75	−14.22	10	−4
United Left of the Valencian Country–The Greens: Plural Left (EUPV–EV)	169,786	6.51	+3.80	1	+1
Union, Progress and Democracy (UPyD)	146,064	5.60	+4.90	1	+1
Bloc–Initiative–Greens–Equo: Commitment Coalition (Compromís–Q)^{1}	125,306	4.81	+3.73	1	+1
Animalist Party Against Mistreatment of Animals (PACMA)	12,508	0.48	+0.33	0	±0
Spain 2000 (E–2000)	9,266	0.36	+0.22	0	±0
Republican Left of the Valencian Country (ERPV)	7,450	0.29	−0.05	0	±0
Communist Party of the Peoples of Spain (PCPE)	4,427	0.17	+0.11	0	±0
Blank Seats (EB)	3,972	0.15	New	0	±0
Humanist Party (PH)	3,003	0.12	+0.09	0	±0
United for Valencia (UxV)^{2}	2,210	0.08	+0.03	0	±0
Republicans (RPS)	2,036	0.08	New	0	±0
Communist Unification of Spain (UCE)	1,980	0.08	New	0	±0
Liberal Democratic Centre (CDL)	1,543	0.06	+0.05	0	±0
Pirate Party (Pirata)	1,001	0.04	New	0	±0
Internationalist Socialist Workers' Party (POSI)	284	0.01	−0.01	0	±0
Blank ballots	28,785	1.10	+0.25		
Total	2,607,328			33	±0
Valid votes	2,607,328	98.80	−0.53		
Invalid votes	31,762	1.20	+0.53		
Votes cast / turnout	2,639,090	74.18	−4.66		
Abstentions	918,738	25.82	+4.66		
Registered voters	3,557,828				
Sources
Footnotes: ^{1} Bloc–Initiative–Greens–Equo: Commitment Coalition results are compared to Bloc–Initiative–Greens totals in the 2008 election.; ^{2} United for Valencia results are compared to Valencian Nationalist Option totals in the 2008 election.

== Autonomous cities ==
=== Ceuta ===
← Summary of the 20 November 2011 Congress of Deputies election results in Ceuta →
Parties and alliances	Popular vote			Seats	
Parties and alliances	Votes	%	±pp	Total	+/−
People's Party (PP)	20,968	65.93	+10.82	1	±0
Spanish Socialist Workers' Party (PSOE)	6,445	20.26	−20.21	0	±0
Caballas Coalition (Caballas)	1,712	5.38	New	0	±0
Union, Progress and Democracy (UPyD)	1,061	3.34	+2.02	0	±0
United Left–Democratic and Social Party of Ceuta: Plural Left (IU–PDSC)	576	1.81	+1.14	0	±0
The Greens–Green Group (LV–GV)	293	0.92	+0.32	0	±0
Animalist Party Against Mistreatment of Animals (PACMA)	186	0.58	+0.31	0	±0
For a Fairer World (PUM+J)	65	0.20	+0.08	0	±0
Blank ballots	498	1.57	+0.63		
Total	31,804			1	±0
Valid votes	31,804	98.52	−0.82		
Invalid votes	478	1.48	+0.82		
Votes cast / turnout	32,282	53.16	−10.16		
Abstentions	28,441	46.84	+10.16		
Registered voters	60,723				

=== Melilla ===
← Summary of the 20 November 2011 Congress of Deputies election results in Melilla →
Parties and alliances	Popular vote			Seats	
Parties and alliances	Votes	%	±pp	Total	+/−
People's Party (PP)	17,828	66.71	+17.68	1	±0
Spanish Socialist Workers' Party (PSOE)	6,766	25.32	−22.78	0	±0
Union, Progress and Democracy (UPyD)	992	3.71	+2.57	0	±0
Equo (Equo)	427	1.60	New	0	±0
Animalist Party Against Mistreatment of Animals (PACMA)	137	0.51	New	0	±0
For a Fairer World (PUM+J)	80	0.30	+0.20	0	±0
Blank ballots	496	1.86	+0.97		
Total	26,726			1	±0
Valid votes	26,726	98.86	−0.40		
Invalid votes	308	1.14	+0.40		
Votes cast / turnout	27,034	49.43	−14.25		
Abstentions	27,656	50.57	+14.25		
Registered voters	54,690				
