= 2011 Spanish general election =

- 20 November 2011

All 350 seats in the Congress of Deputies and 208 (of 266) seats in the Senate 176 seats needed for a majority in the Congress of Deputies
- Opinion polls
- Registered: 35,779,491 ▲2.0%
- Turnout: 24,666,441 (68.9%) ▼4.9 pp
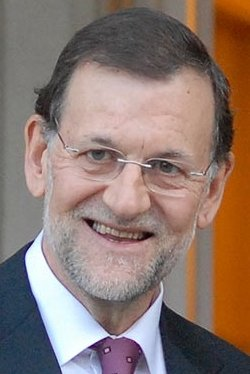

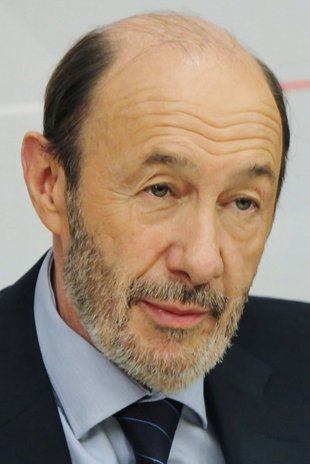

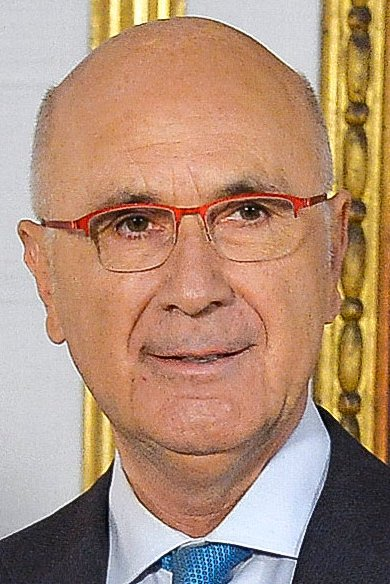

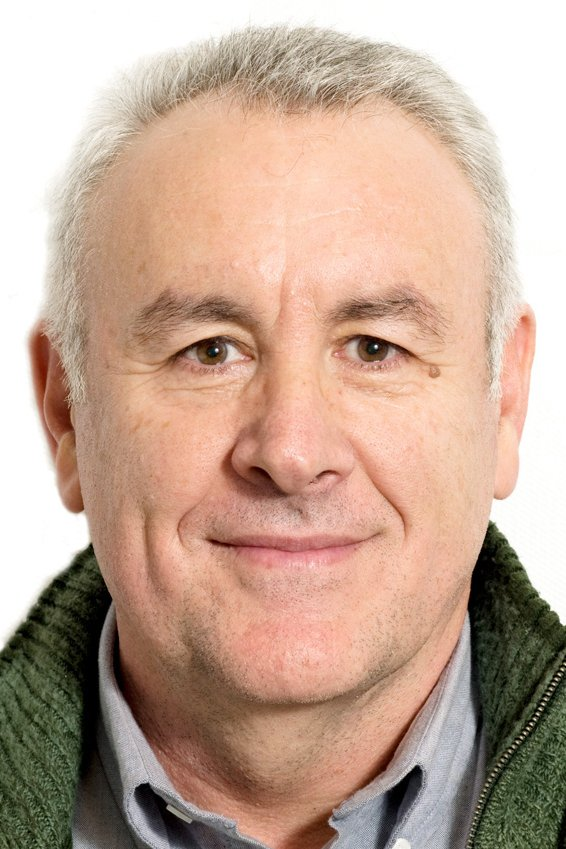

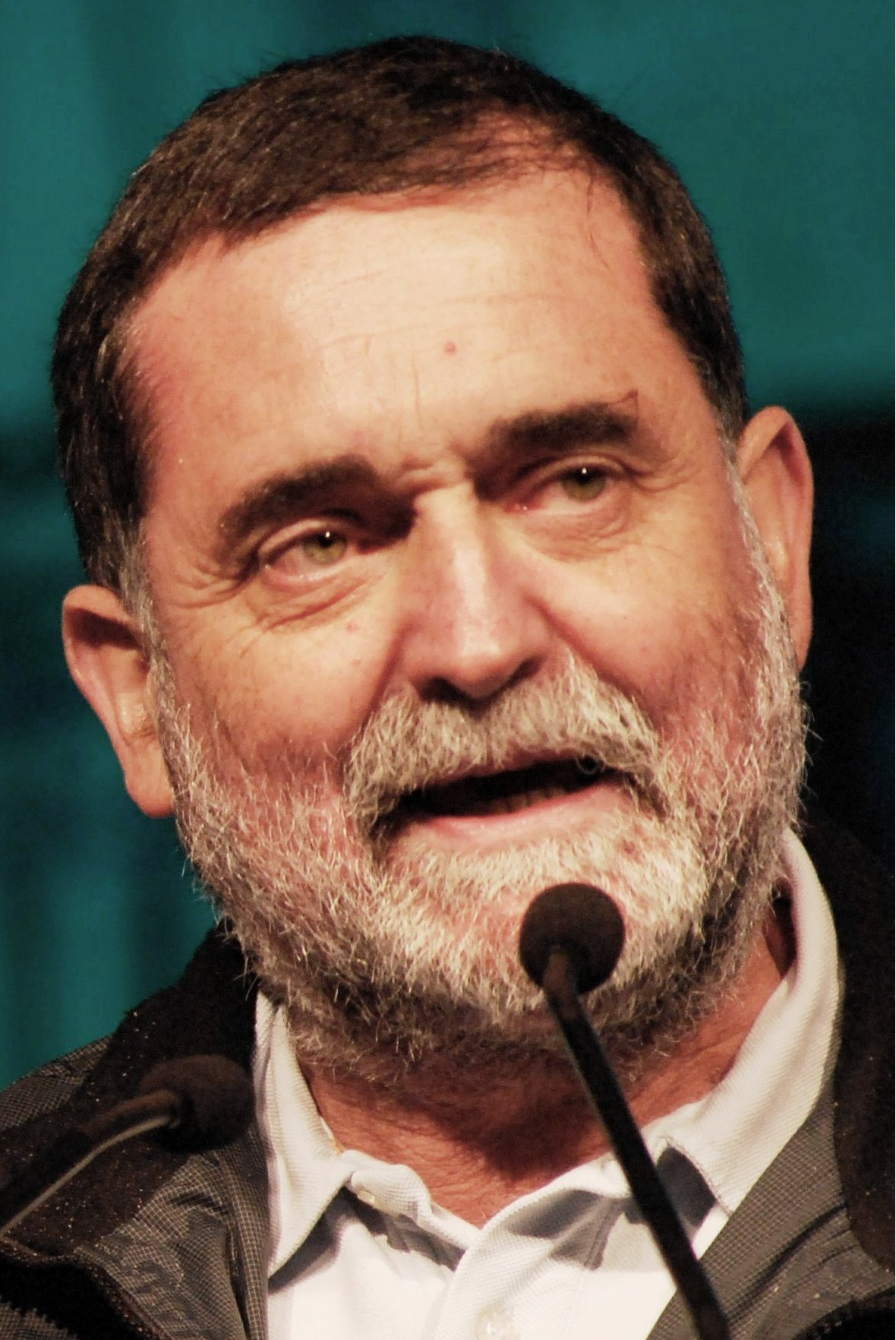

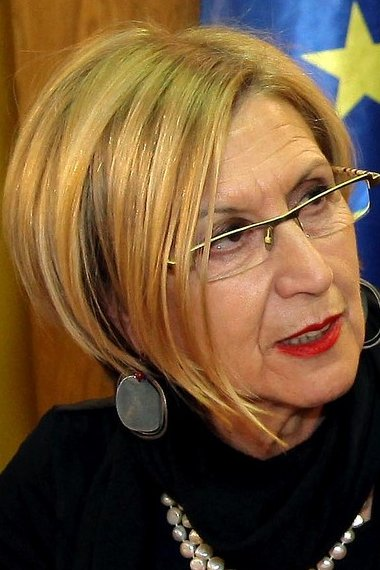
	First party	Second party	Third party
Leader	Mariano Rajoy	Alfredo Pérez Rubalcaba	Josep Antoni Duran i Lleida
Party	PP	PSOE	CiU
Leader since	2 September 2003	9 July 2011	24 January 2004
Leader's seat	Madrid	Madrid	Barcelona
Last election	154 seats, 40.1% (Note: Results for PP (39.9%, 154 deputies), PAR (0.2%, 0 deputies) and EU (0.0%, 0 deputies) in the 2008 Congress election.)	169 seats, 43.9%	10 seats, 3.0%
Seats won	186	110	16
Seat change	▲32	▼59	▲6
Popular vote	10,866,566	7,003,511	1,015,691
Percentage	44.6%	28.8%	4.2%
Swing	▲4.5 pp	▼15.1 pp	▲1.2 pp
	Fourth party	Fifth party	Sixth party
Leader	Cayo Lara	Iñaki Antigüedad (Note: Amaiur did not field a single visible leader; instead, prominence was given to the lead candidate in each of the constituencies where it ran. Iñaki Antigüedad from Biscay was later selected as Amaiur's spokesperson in Congress.)	Rosa Díez
Party	IU	Amaiur	UPyD
Leader since	14 December 2008	11 October 2011	26 September 2007
Leader's seat	Madrid	Biscay	Madrid
Last election	2 seats, 3.9% (Note: Results for IU (3.8%, 2 deputies) and CHA (0.1%, 0 deputies) in the 2008 Congress election.)	0 seats, 0.3% (Note: Results for EA (0.2%, 0 deputies) and Aralar (0.1%, 0 deputies) in the 2008 Congress election.)	1 seats, 1.2%
Seats won	11	7	5
Seat change	▲9	▲7	▲4
Popular vote	1,686,040	334,498	1,143,225
Percentage	6.9%	1.4%	4.7%
Swing	▲3.0 pp	▲1.1 pp	▲3.5 pp
Prime Minister before election
José Luis Rodríguez Zapatero
PSOE
Prime Minister after election
Mariano Rajoy
PP

A general election was held in Spain on 20 November 2011 to elect the members of the 10th Cortes Generales under the Spanish Constitution of 1978. All 350 seats in the Congress of Deputies were up for election, as well as 208 of 266 seats in the Senate. It was held four months ahead of schedule, and was noted for coinciding with the 36th anniversary of the death of dictator Francisco Franco.

The second term of Prime Minister José Luis Rodríguez Zapatero was quickly overshadowed by the impact of the Great Recession in Spain, aggravated by the Spanish property bubble's crash that led to a real-estate crisis. Unemployment reached record highs as public deficit and bond yields soared, with the popularity of Zapatero's government and his ruling Spanish Socialist Workers' Party (PSOE) plummeting after being forced to U-turn in economic policy and adopt tough austerity measures and spending cuts, as well as a 2011 constitutional reform introducing a balanced budget amendment. Concurrently, the curtailment of the Catalan Statute of Autonomy by the Constitutional Court of Spain in 2010 sparked protests and helped fuel pro-independence sentiment in the region. Despite the economic outlook, the government still attempted to push through some measures in its social agenda, such as a liberalization of abortion laws.

Growing discontent saw a general strike in September 2010, an air traffic controllers' strike in December 2010 (which led to the first use of emergency powers since 1975), and the onset of the anti-austerity movement in Spain in May 2011. This, together with consistent opinion polling leads for the opposition People's Party (PP) under Mariano Rajoy—who had survived a plot to overthrow him during a 2008 party congress—materialized in the PSOE's collapse in the 2011 local and regional elections. Zapatero quit seeking a third term in office, with the first deputy prime minister, Alfredo Pérez Rubalcaba, being selected as PSOE candidate unopposed. Mounting political and economic pressure forced Zapatero to call a snap election for November 2011. During this period, the separatist ETA group announced a permanent ceasefire and subsequent cessation of all armed operations, turning the election into the first since the Spanish transition to democracy without ETA activity.

Under falling voter turnout, the election saw the PSOE being swept out from power in the worst defeat for a sitting Spanish government up until that time since 1982, losing four million votes in its worst performance since 1977, Rajoy's PP won in a landslide, beating José María Aznar's result in 2000; it was also the second largest and, to date, last single-party absolute majority in a nationwide Spanish election. The left-wing United Left saw a turnaround of its electoral fortunes with its first remarkable increase in fifteen years, whereas centrist Union, Progress and Democracy exceeded expectations with over one million votes, five seats and just short of the five percent threshold required for being recognized a parliamentary group in Congress. The nationalist Convergence and Union topped the poll in Catalonia for the first time ever, whereas the abertzale left platform Amaiur achieved a major breakthrough in both the Basque Country and Navarre. Rajoy was subsequently elected as prime minister of Spain, forming a majority government after eight years in opposition.

== Background ==
The 2008 general election brought a second consecutive victory for the Spanish Socialist Workers' Party (PSOE), which fell seven seats short of an overall majority. Declining to form a coalition or seek confidence and supply agreements with smaller parties, José Luis Rodríguez Zapatero was re-elected as prime minister of Spain on the second ballot of investiture and went on to form the first female-majority cabinet in Spain's history. By then, the Spanish economy was already showing signs of fatigue and slowing after a decade of growth.

The defeat of the opposition People's Party (PP) led some internal factions and conservative media to question Mariano Rajoy's leadership. After fending off a challenge from the Madrilenian president, Esperanza Aguirre, Rajoy was re-elected at the July 2008 PP congress, but the internal crisis continued for months amid several political scandals. In early 2009, El País unveiled an alleged plot by the Madrid regional government to spy on Aguirre's political rivals. Soon after, the Spanish National Court opened a judicial probe into the Gürtel affair, which implicated the PP—especially its Madrid and Valencia branches—in a bribery, money laundering, and tax evasion scheme. Investigations were delayed due to the examining magistrate, Baltasar Garzón, being tried for violating lawyer-client privilege through wiretapping, while criticism over a hunting trip with him prompted the resignation of the justice minister, Mariano Fernández Bermejo. The PP victories in the 2009 Galician and European Parliament elections helped reassert Rajoy's authority within his party amid voters' growing economic concerns.

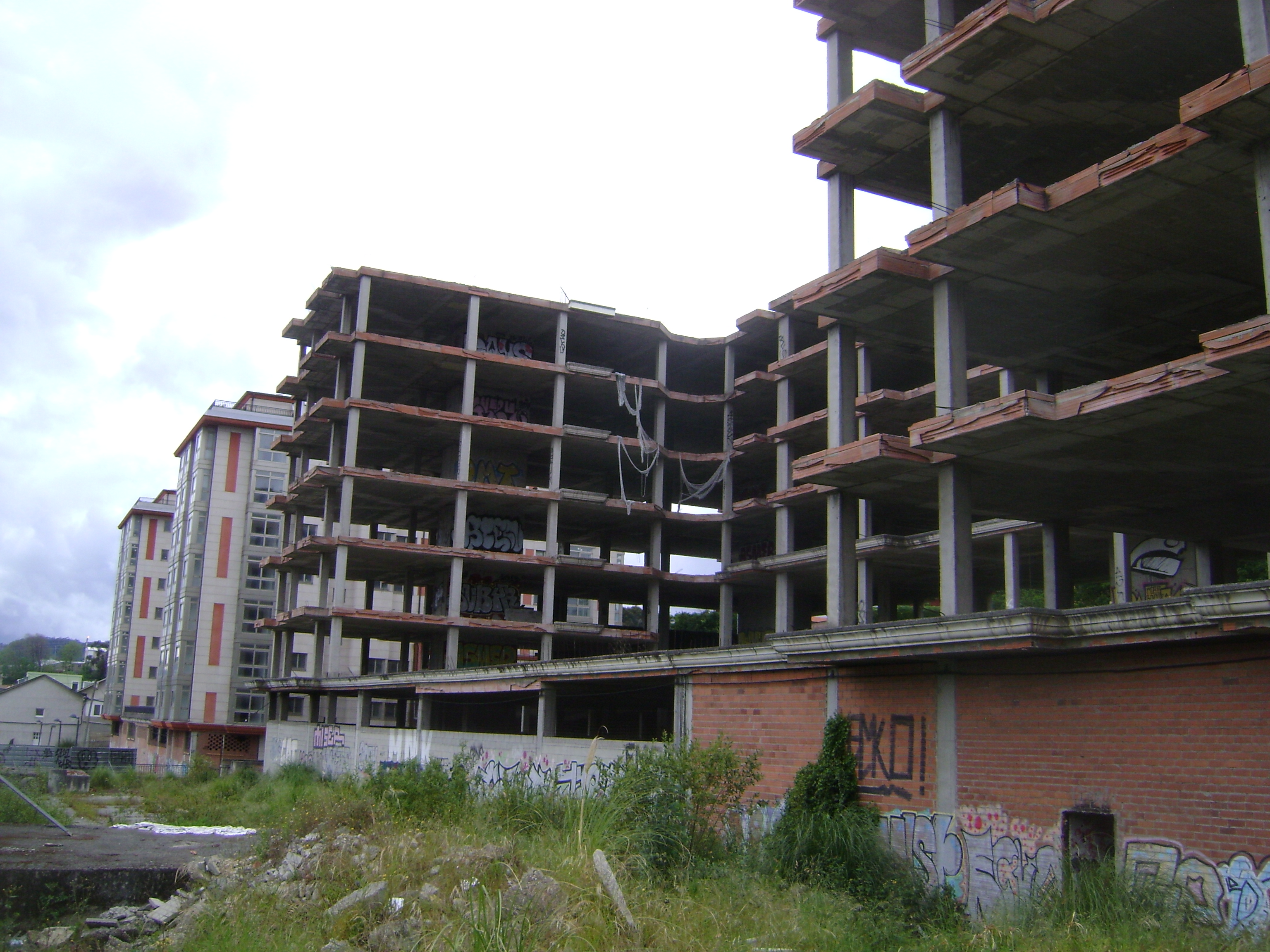
The crash of the Spanish property bubble caused a real estate crisis. This made Spain one of the countries hardest hit by the Great Recession, leading to an increase in unemployment and a ballooning budget deficit.

The impact of the Great Recession in Spain dominated Zapatero's second term, with early criticism focused on his delay in acknowledging the crisis and acting sooner. Worsening forecasts and rising fuel prices pushed the government to approve a first stimulus package based on tax rebates and the removal of the wealth tax, while a truck drivers' strike erupted in June 2008. The crash of the Spanish property bubble triggered a real-estate crisis, and the July 2008 bankruptcy of Martinsa-Fadesa became Spain's largest corporate default. A second stimulus package in August included further tax deductions, the opening up of the services sector, red tape cuts for small and medium enterprises (SMEs), and simplified environmental plan requirements. The bankruptcy of Lehman Brothers in September deepened the global financial crisis and caused historic losses for the Madrid Stock Exchange. By the end of 2008, Spain had entered recession, with inflation and unemployment surging. The Spanish government's €50-billion "Plan E" public works program failed to meet its goals and drew criticism for its unsustainable spending. A banking crisis forced the state bailout of several failing savings banks, with the FROB being established to manage restructuring. In April 2009, Pedro Solbes was replaced by Elena Salgado as economy and finance minister, and further austerity measures—including tax hikes (particularly VAT) and cuts in non-essential spending—were introduced to contain the growing public deficit.

Zapatero's government initially tried to avoid cutting social security and welfare state policies, but the rising deficit and unemployment, together with fears of contagion from the Greek government-debt crisis (in turn threatening a euro area crisis), forced Zapatero to announce emergency measures on 12 May 2010 aimed at preventing a sovereign default and bailout; these included cuts to civil servants' wages and dependency spending, a pension freeze and the removal of birth allowances. A labour reform followed, introducing incentives to youth employment, decentralizing collective bargaining, and reducing severance payments for layoffs. These U-turns caused approval ratings for both Zapatero and the PSOE to collapse, as well as a general strike in September 2010. Zapatero attempted to regain political initiative with a major cabinet reshuffle in October, but his government had to deal with an air traffic controllers' strike in December 2010, which led to a state of alarm (the first since the Spanish transition to democracy). Rising bond yields and threats to Spain's credit ratings prompted further measures, including the partial privatizations of AENA and the State Lotteries, higher tobacco taxes, limits on unemployment benefits, and a tax cut for SMEs. A pension reform saw the compulsory retirement age rising from 65 to 67 years. Growing discontent with austerity culminated in the 15-M Movement in May 2011, also known as "the indignant ones" (Spanish: Indignados), which would spark protests, demonstrations and occupations in Spain in the ensuing years.

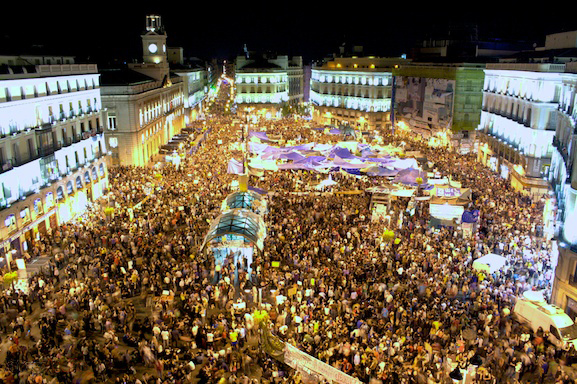
The Puerta del Sol square in Madrid (depicted here on 20 May 2011) became a focal point and a symbol during the anti-austerity protests in Spain.

Domestically, the government dealt with the 2008 Spanair plane crash, the 2009 swine flu pandemic, and outrage over the 2009 hijacking of fishing trawler Alakrana to piracy off the coast of Somalia. It promoted a new abortion law based on a time limits-scheme (no conditions until the 14th week, and up to the 22nd week in cases of pregnancy complications), while also removing parental consent for minors aged 16–17. During this period, the government adopted a new regional financing model, laws on sustainable economy and internet copyright infringements (the controversial Sinde Law), and a major Criminal Code reform that introduced harsher penalties for terrorism, sex crimes and real-estate corruption. In 2010, a ruling by the Constitutional Court curtailed the Catalan Statute of Autonomy—following a PP appeal—sparking protests in the region and fueling a sovereigntist and, ultimately, pro-independence movement. Economic hardship also contributed to the fall of the tripartite government in the 2010 Catalan election and the victory of Artur Mas's Convergence and Union.

ETA group's activity, weakened by police blows to the group's capabilities, still saw a 2008 attack on the EITB offices, and the Burgos and Palma Nova bombings in 2009. ETA's first murder of a French policeman in March 2010 also became its last, as it announced a ceasefire in September 2010, declared permanent in January 2011. A judicial investigation uncovered a tip-off during the 2006 ceasefire that had delayed the dismantling of an ETA extortion network (the so-called Faisán affair); the opposition PP tried to link the case to the interior minister, Alfredo Pérez Rubalcaba, but only two police officers were ultimately tried and convicted. Concurrently, the Supreme and Constitutional courts banned several parties with alleged ties to the outlawed Batasuna, including the Communist Party of the Basque Homelands; the Basque Nationalist Action, several groups formed to contest the 2009 Basque election (D3M and Askatasuna), and Sortu. The Constitutional Court allowed the abertzale left to contest the 2011 local elections under the Bildu banner, which achieved a major electoral breakthrough.

On 2 April 2011, Zapatero announced that he would not seek a third term as prime minister, but his initial plan to hold a party primary to choose a successor was scrapped following the PSOE's heavy defeats in the 2011 local and regional elections. Defence minister and likely contender Carme Chacón withdrew from the race in favour of Rubalcaba, who became the party's prime ministerial candidate unopposed. The final months of Zapatero's term were marked by a constitutional reform in the summer of 2011 introducing a balanced budget amendment, and his decision to bring forward the general election to 20 November in response to mounting political and economic pressure.

== Overview ==
Under the 1978 Constitution, the Spanish Cortes Generales were conceived as an imperfect bicameral system. The Congress of Deputies held greater legislative power than the Senate, having the ability to grant or withdraw confidence from a prime minister and to override Senate vetoes by an absolute majority. Nonetheless, the Senate retained a limited number of specific functions—such as ratifying international treaties, authorizing cooperation agreements between autonomous communities, enforcing direct rule, regulating interterritorial compensation funds, and taking part in constitutional amendments and in the appointment of members to the Constitutional Court and the General Council of the Judiciary—which were not subject to override by Congress.

=== Date ===
The term of each chamber of the Cortes Generales—the Congress and the Senate—expired four years from the date of their previous election, unless they were dissolved earlier. The election decree was required to be issued no later than 25 days before the scheduled expiration date of parliament and published on the following day in the Official State Gazette (BOE), with election day taking place 54 days after the decree's publication. The previous election was held on 9 March 2008, which meant that the chambers' terms would have expired on 9 March 2012. The election decree was required to be published in the BOE no later than 14 February 2012, setting the latest possible date for election day on 8 April 2012.

The prime minister had the prerogative to propose the monarch to dissolve both chambers at any given time—either jointly or separately—and call a snap election, provided that no motion of no confidence was in process, no state of emergency was in force and that dissolution did not occur before one year after a previous one. Additionally, both chambers were to be dissolved and a new election called if an investiture process failed to elect a prime minister within a two-month period from the first ballot. Barring this exception, there was no constitutional requirement for simultaneous elections to the Congress and the Senate. Still, as of 2026, there has been no precedent of separate elections taking place under the 1978 Constitution.

As the Great Recession took its hold in Spain, Zapatero rejected early demands from the opposition PP to call a snap election in 2009 and 2010, as well as following the PSOE's heavy defeat in the May 2011 local and regional elections, assuring that it would be held when due in March 2012. In a change of heart and amid increased pressure to Spain's sovereign debt, Zapatero announced on 29 July 2011 that he would call the general election for 20 November, justifying it so that "a new government can take charge of the economy in 2012, fresh from the balloting". The advance notice (two months before dissolution) was enough to still give his government time to approve pending reforms (such as further deficit cuts, a reform of collective agreements, or the streamlining of the justice system). Behind the scenes, it was speculated that the decision came from PSOE candidate Alfredo Pérez Rubalcaba's desire to avoid further political erosion due to the worsening economic indicators.

The Cortes Generales were officially dissolved on 27 September 2011 with the publication of the corresponding decree in the BOE, setting election day for 20 November and scheduling for both chambers to reconvene on 13 December.

=== Electoral system ===
Voting for each chamber of the Cortes Generales was based on universal suffrage, comprising all Spanish nationals over 18 years of age with full political rights, provided that they had not been deprived of the right to vote by a final sentence, nor were legally incapacitated. Amendments earlier in 2011 required non-resident citizens to apply for voting, a system known as "begged" voting (Spanish: Voto rogado).

The Congress of Deputies had a minimum of 300 and a maximum of 400 seats, with electoral provisions fixing its size at 350. Of these, 348 were elected in 50 multi-member constituencies corresponding to the provinces of Spain—each of which was assigned an initial minimum of two seats and the remaining 248 distributed in proportion to population—using the D'Hondt method and closed-list proportional voting, with a three percent-threshold of valid votes (including blank ballots) in each constituency. The remaining two seats were allocated to Ceuta and Melilla as single-member districts elected by plurality voting. The use of this electoral method resulted in a higher effective threshold depending on district magnitude and vote distribution.

As a result of the aforementioned allocation, each Congress multi-member constituency was entitled the following seats:

Seats	Constituencies (Note: The province of Guipúzcoa was officially renamed as "Gipuzkoa" on 7 July 2011.)
36	Madrid^{(+1)}
31	Barcelona
16	Valencia
12	Alicante, Seville
10	Málaga, Murcia
8	A Coruña, Asturias, Balearic Islands, Biscay, Cádiz^{(−1)}, Las Palmas
7	Granada, Pontevedra, Santa Cruz de Tenerife, Zaragoza
6	Almería, Badajoz, Córdoba, Gipuzkoa, Girona, Jaén, Tarragona, Toledo
5	Cantabria, Castellón, Ciudad Real, Huelva, León, Navarre, Valladolid
4	Álava, Albacete, Burgos, Cáceres, La Rioja, Lleida, Lugo, Ourense, Salamanca
3	Ávila, Cuenca, Guadalajara, Huesca, Palencia, Segovia, Teruel, Zamora
2	Soria

208 Senate seats were elected using open-list (Note: Parties could group candidates into lists, although each candidate was treated separately for the purpose of the voting procedure.) partial block voting: voters in constituencies electing four seats could choose up to three candidates; in those with two or three seats, up to two; and in single-member districts, one. Each of the 47 peninsular provinces was allocated four seats, while in insular provinces—such as the Balearic and Canary Islands—the districts were the islands themselves, with the larger ones (Mallorca, Gran Canaria and Tenerife) being allocated three seats each, and the smaller ones (Menorca, Ibiza–Formentera, Fuerteventura, La Gomera, El Hierro, Lanzarote and La Palma) one each. Ceuta and Melilla elected two seats each. Additionally, autonomous communities could appoint at least one senator each and were entitled to one additional seat per million inhabitants.

The law did not provide for by-elections to fill vacant seats; instead, any vacancies arising after the proclamation of candidates and during the legislative term were filled by the next candidates on the party lists or, when required, by designated substitutes.

=== Outgoing parliament ===
The tables below show the composition of the parliamentary groups in both chambers at the time of dissolution.

Parliamentary composition in September 2011
Congress of Deputies
Groups	Parties	Deputies	
Groups	Parties	Seats	Total
Socialist Parliamentary Group	PSOE	144	169
Socialist Parliamentary Group	PSC	25	169
People's Parliamentary Group in the Congress	PP	152	152
Catalan Parliamentary Group (Convergence and Union)	CDC	6	10
Catalan Parliamentary Group (Convergence and Union)	UDC	4	10
Republican Left–United Left–Initiative for Catalonia Greens' Parliamentary Group	ERC	3	5
Republican Left–United Left–Initiative for Catalonia Greens' Parliamentary Group	IU	1	5
Republican Left–United Left–Initiative for Catalonia Greens' Parliamentary Group	ICV	1	5
Basque Parliamentary Group (EAJ/PNV)	EAJ/PNV	6	6
Mixed Parliamentary Group	UPN	2	8
Mixed Parliamentary Group	BNG	2	8
Mixed Parliamentary Group	CC	2	8
Mixed Parliamentary Group	UPyD	1	8
Mixed Parliamentary Group	GBai	1	8

Parliamentary composition in September 2011
Senate (Note: 2 seats were vacant as a result of a lack of substitutes to replace the resigned Corina Porro (PP) and Cáceres Lino González (PSOE).)
Groups	Parties	Senators	
Groups	Parties	Seats	Total
People's Parliamentary Group in the Senate	PP	125	125
Socialist Parliamentary Group	PSOE	103	103
Catalan Agreement of Progress; Parliamentary Group	PSC	10	15
Catalan Agreement of Progress; Parliamentary Group	ERC	3	15
Catalan Agreement of Progress; Parliamentary Group	ICV	2	15
Convergence and Union's; Catalan Parliamentary Group in the Senate	CDC	7	8
Convergence and Union's; Catalan Parliamentary Group in the Senate	UDC	1	8
Nationalist Senators' Parliamentary Group	EAJ/PNV	3	4
Nationalist Senators' Parliamentary Group	BNG	1	4
Mixed Parliamentary Group	UPN	2	7
Mixed Parliamentary Group	PSOE	2 (Note: PSOE legislators Artur Bagur and Margalida Font had been elected for the constituencies of Menorca and Ibiza within wider electoral alliances, and went into the Mixed Group as part of their election agreements.)	7
Mixed Parliamentary Group	CC	1	7
Mixed Parliamentary Group	AHI	1	7
Mixed Parliamentary Group	FAC	1	7

== Candidates ==
=== Nomination rules ===
Spanish citizens with the right to vote could run for election, provided that they had not been criminally imprisoned by a final sentence or convicted—whether final or not—of offences that involved loss of eligibility or disqualification from public office (such as rebellion, terrorism or other crimes against the state). Additional causes of ineligibility applied to the following officials:

- Members of the Spanish royal family and their spouses;
- Holders of a number of senior public or institutional posts, including the heads and members of higher courts and state institutions; (Note: These comprised the Constitutional Court, the General Council of the Judiciary, the Supreme Court, the Council of State, the Court of Auditors and the Economic and Social Council.) the Ombudsman; the State's Attorney General; high-ranking officials of government departments, the Office of the Prime Minister and other state agencies; government delegates in the autonomous communities; the chair of RTVE; the director of the Electoral Register Office; the governor and deputy governor of the Bank of Spain; the heads of official credit institutions; and members of electoral commissions and of the Nuclear Safety Council;
- Heads of diplomatic missions abroad;
- Judges and public prosecutors in active service;
- Members of the Armed Forces and law enforcement bodies in active service.

Other ineligibility provisions also applied to a number of territorial officials in these categories within their areas of jurisdiction, as well as to employees of foreign states and members of regional governments.

Incompatibility rules included those of ineligibility, and also barred running in multiple constituencies or lists, holding office if the candidacy was later declared illegal (by a final ruling), and combining legislative roles (deputy, senator, and regional lawmaker) with each other or with:

- A number of senior public or institutional posts, including the presidency of the National Commission on Markets and Competition; and leadership positions in RTVE, government offices, public authorities (such as port authorities, hydrographic confederations, or highway concessionary companies), public entities and state-owned or publicly funded companies;
- Any other paid public or private position, except university teaching.

=== Parties and lists ===
The electoral law allowed for parties and federations registered in the interior ministry, alliances and groupings of electors to present lists of candidates. Parties and federations intending to form an alliance were required to inform the relevant electoral commission within 10 days of the election call, whereas groupings of electors needed to secure the signature of at least one percent of the electorate in the constituencies for which they sought election, disallowing electors from signing for more than one list. Concurrently, parties, federations or alliances that had not obtained a mandate in either chamber of the Cortes at the preceding election were required to secure the signature of at least 0.1 percent of electors in the aforementioned constituencies. Additionally, a balanced composition of men and women was required in the lists of candidates, so that candidates of either sex made up at least 40 percent of the total composition.

Below is a list of the main parties and alliances which contested the election:

Candidacy	Parties and alliances	Leading candidate	Ideology	Previous result				Gov.	Ref.
Candidacy	Parties and alliances	Leading candidate	Ideology	Congress		Senate		Gov.	Ref.
Candidacy	Parties and alliances	Leading candidate	Ideology	Vote %	Seats	Vote %	Seats	Gov.	Ref.
PSOE	List: Spanish Socialist Workers' Party (PSOE); Socialists' Party of Catalonia (PSC); Extremaduran Coalition (PREx–CREx) – Extremaduran Regionalist Party (PREx) – Regionalist Convergence of Extremadura (CREx)	Alfredo Pérez Rubalcaba	Social democracy	43.9%	169	37.2%	88	Yes	
PP	List: People's Party (PP); Navarrese People's Union (UPN); Aragonese Party (PAR); United Extremadura (EU); Nationalist Canarian Centre (CCN); Municipal Assemblies of Fuerteventura (AMF); Majorero Progressive Party (PPMAJO); Liberal Centre of Antigua (CLAN)	Mariano Rajoy	Conservatism; Christian democracy	40.1%	154	40.4% (Note: Results for PP (40.2%, 101 senators), PAR (0.2%, 0 senators) and EU (0.0%, 0 senators) in the 2008 Senate election.)	101	No	
CiU	List: Convergence and Union (CiU) – Democratic Convergence of Catalonia (CDC) – Democratic Union of Catalonia (UDC)	Josep Antoni Duran i Lleida	Catalan nationalism Centrism	3.0%	10	3.5%	4	No	
EAJ/PNV	List: Basque Nationalist Party (EAJ/PNV)	Josu Erkoreka	Basque nationalism Christian democracy	1.2%	6	1.3%	2	No	
esquerra	List: Republican Left of Catalonia (ERC); Catalonia Yes (CatSí); Independence Rally (RI.cat)	Alfred Bosch	Catalan independence Left-wing nationalism Social democracy	1.2%	3	Contested in alliance (Note: PSC–PSOE (8 senators), ERC (3 senators), ICV (1 senator) and EUiA (0 senators) contested the 2008 Senate election within the Entesa alliance.)		No	
IU–LV	List: United Left (IU) – Communist Party of Spain (PCE) – Collective for the Unity of Workers–Andalusian Left Bloc (CUT–BAI) – Revolutionary Workers' Party (POR) – Republican Left (IR); Initiative for Catalonia Greens–United and Alternative Left (ICV–EUiA) – Initiative for Catalonia Greens (ICV) – United and Alternative Left (EUiA); Aragonese Union (CHA); Independent Socialists of Extremadura (SIEx); Left (I–E) – Assembly (Batzarre); The Greens (LV); Green and Red Canaries (CVR) – Canaries for the Left–Yes We Can (CxIzq–SSP) – Party for Services and Public Employed (PSyEP); Democratic and Social Party of Ceuta (PDSC)	Cayo Lara	Socialism; Communism	3.9%	2	3.0% (Note: Results for IU (2.9%, 0 senators) and CHA (0.2%, 0 senators) in the 2008 Senate election.)	0	No	
CC– NC–PNC	List: Canarian Coalition (CC); New Canaries (NC); Canarian Nationalist Party (PNC); Independent Herrenian Group (AHI)	Ana Oramas	Regionalism; Canarian nationalism Centrism	0.8% (Note: Results for CC–PNC (0.7%, 2 deputies) and NC–CCN (0.1%, 0 deputies) in the 2008 Congress election.)	2	0.5% (Note: Results for CC–PNC (0.4%, 1 senator) and NC–CCN (0.1%, 0 senators) in the 2008 Senate election.)	1	No	
BNG	List: Galician Nationalist Bloc (BNG) – Galician People's Union (UPG) – Socialist Collective (CS) – Galician Nationalist Party–Galicianist Party (PNG–PG) – Nationalist Left (EN) – Inzar (Inzar) – Irmandiño Meeting (EI) – Galician Socialist Space (ESG) – Galician Movement for Socialism (MGS) – More Galicia (+Gz)	Francisco Jorquera	Galician nationalism Left-wing nationalism Socialism	0.8%	2	1.0%	0	No	
UPyD	List: Union, Progress and Democracy (UPyD)	Rosa Díez	Social liberalism Radical centrism	1.2%	1	1.0%	0	No	
GBai	List: Expanding (Zabaltzen); Villava Group (AT); Basque Nationalist Party (EAJ/PNV)	Uxue Barkos	Basque nationalism Social democracy	0.2% (Note: Results for NaBai in the 2008 election.)	1	0.3%	0	No	
Amaiur	List: Create (Sortu); Basque Solidarity (EA); Aralar (Aralar); Alternative (Alternatiba)	Iñaki Antigüedad	Basque independence Abertzale left Socialism	0.3%	0	0.3% (Note: Results for EA (0.2%, 0 senators) and Aralar (0.1%, 0 senators) in the 2008 Senate election.)	0	No	
Compromís	List: Valencian Nationalist Bloc (Bloc); Valencian People's Initiative (IdPV); The Greens–Ecologist Left of the Valencian Country (EVEE); Equo (Equo)	Joan Baldoví	Valencianism; Progressivism; Green politics	0.1% (Note: Results for Bloc–IdPV–EVEE in the 2008 election.)	0	0.1%	0	No	
PSC– ICV–EUiA	List: Socialists' Party of Catalonia (PSC); Initiative for Catalonia Greens (ICV); United and Alternative Left (EUiA)	Mònica Almiñana	Catalanism; Social democracy Eco-socialism	Did not contest		7.6%	9	No	
FAC	List: Forum of Citizens (FAC)	Enrique Álvarez Sostres	Regionalism; Conservatism	Did not contest				No	

The Socialists' Party of Catalonia (PSC), Initiative for Catalonia Greens (ICV) and United and Alternative Left (EUiA) continued their Catalan Senate alliance without ERC, under the Agreement for Catalonia Progress name. An attempt to re-establish the 2008 alliance in the Ibiza–Formentera Senate constituency failed due to the opposition of Ibiza for Change (ExC).

The new green Equo party allied itself with PSM–Nationalist Agreement (PSM–EN), Initiative Greens (IV) and Agreement for Mallorca (ExM) in the Balearic Islands and with Sí Se Puede (SSP) and Socialists for Tenerife (SxTf) in the Santa Cruz de Tenerife constituency.

== Campaign ==
=== Timetable ===
The key dates are listed below (all times are CET. The Canary Islands used WET (UTC+0) instead):

- 26 September: The election decree is issued with the countersign of the prime minister, after deliberation in the Council of Ministers, ratified by the King.
- 27 September: Formal dissolution of parliament and start of prohibition period on the inauguration of public works, services or projects.
- 30 September: Initial constitution of provincial and zone electoral commissions with judicial members.
- 3 October: Division of constituencies into polling sections and stations.
- 7 October: Deadline for parties and federations to report on their electoral alliances.
- 10 October: Deadline for electoral register consultation for the purpose of possible corrections.
- 17 October: Deadline for parties, federations, alliances, and groupings of electors to present electoral lists.
- 19 October: Publication of submitted electoral lists in the Official State Gazette (BOE).
- 22 October: Deadline for non-resident citizens (electors residing abroad (CERA) and citizens temporarily absent from Spain) to apply for voting.
- 24 October: Official proclamation of validly submitted electoral lists.
- 25 October: Publication of proclaimed electoral lists in the BOE.
- 26 October: Deadline for the selection of polling station members by sortition.
- 3 November: Deadline for the appointment of non-judicial members to provincial and zone electoral commissions.
- 4 November: Official start of electoral campaigning.
- 10 November: Deadline to apply for postal voting.
- 15 November: Start of legal ban on electoral opinion polling publication; deadline for CERA citizens to vote by mail.
- 16 November: Deadline for postal and temporarily absent voting.
- 18 November: Last day of electoral campaigning; deadline for CERA voting.
- 19 November: Official election silence ("reflection day").
- 20 November: Election day (polling stations open at 9 am and close at 8 pm or once voters present in a queue at/outside the polling station at 8 pm have cast their vote); provisional vote counting.
- 23 November: Start of general vote counting, including CERA votes.
- 26 November: Deadline for the general vote counting.
- 5 December: Deadline for the proclamation of elected members.
- 15 December: Deadline for the reconvening of parliament (date determined by the election decree, which for the 2011 election was set for 13 December).
- 14 January: Deadline for the publication of definitive election results in the BOE.

=== Party slogans ===
Party or alliance	Original slogan	English translation	Ref.
PSOE	« Pelea por lo que quieres »	"Fight for what you want"	
PP	« Súmate al cambio »	"Join the change"	
CiU	« La nostra força »	"Our strength"	
EAJ/PNV	« Euskadiren alde. Euskadi puede »	"For the Basque Country. The Basque Country can do it"	
Esquerra	« República del Sí »	"Republic of Yes"	
IU–LV	« Rebélate! »	"Rebel!"	
BNG	« A alternativa que te defende. O voto útil en Galiza »	"The alternative that defends you" & "The tactical vote in Galicia"	
UPyD	« Cada voto vale »	"Each vote counts"	
GBai	« Sí, tenemos futuro » « Bai, dadugu geroa »	"Yes, we have a future"	
FAC	« Más Asturias, Mejor España »	"More Asturias, Better Spain"	
Amaiur	« Eraiki zubia » « Tendiendo puentes »	"Bridging"	
Compromís–Q	« Som com tu »	"We are like you"	

=== Debates ===
2011 Spanish general election debates
Date	Organizer(s)	Moderator(s)	P Present (Note: Denotes a main invitee attending the event.) S Surrogate (Note: Denotes a main invitee not attending the event, sending a surrogate in their place.) NI Not invited I Invited A Absent invitee						
Date	Organizer(s)	Moderator(s)	PSOE	PP	IU	CiU	PNV	Share	Ref.
7 November	ATV	Manuel Campo Vidal	P Rubalcaba	P Rajoy	NI	NI	NI	54.2% (12,006,000)	
9 November	RTVE	María Casado	S Jáuregui	S Gallardón	S Llamazares	S Macias	P Erkoreka	11.5% (2,164,000)	

Opinion polls

Candidate viewed as "performing best" or "most convincing" in each debate
Debate	Polling firm/Commissioner	PSOE	PP	Tie	None	Question
7 November	Metroscopia/El País	41.0	46.0	6.0	6.0	1.0
7 November	Sigma Dos/El Mundo	44.2	51.4	–	–	4.4
7 November	TNS Demoscopia/Antena 3	33.1	43.9	–	23.0	–
7 November	Invymark/laSexta	39.9	48.6	11.5	–	–
7 November	CIS	23.4	39.6	5.4	24.4	7.2

== Opinion polls ==
Local regression trend line of poll results from 9 March 2008 to 20 November 2011, with each line corresponding to a political party.

== Voter turnout ==
The table below shows registered voter turnout during the election. Figures for election day do not include non-resident citizens, while final figures do.

Region	Time (Election day)									Final		
Region	14:00			18:00			20:00			Final		
Region	2008	2011	+/–	2008	2011	+/–	2008	2011	+/–	2008	2011	+/–
Andalusia	39.06%	37.76%	−1.30	59.51%	57.66%	−1.85	73.79%	70.69%	−3.10	72.77%	68.90%	−3.87
Aragon	42.40%	39.54%	−2.86	61.39%	57.44%	−3.95	76.79%	72.57%	−4.22	75.92%	70.99%	−4.93
Asturias	38.39%	36.71%	−1.68	59.55%	56.23%	−3.32	73.82%	70.33%	−3.49	71.29%	64.57%	−6.72
Balearic Islands	39.18%	35.17%	−4.01	56.07%	50.37%	−5.70	68.19%	62.20%	−5.99	67.57%	60.96%	−6.61
Basque Country	37.30%	38.34%	+1.04	53.42%	56.08%	+2.66	64.90%	69.22%	+4.32	64.03%	67.34%	+3.31
Canary Islands	30.65%	28.03%	−2.62	49.86%	45.95%	−3.91	67.61%	63.72%	−3.89	65.87%	59.60%	−6.27
Cantabria	42.66%	40.44%	−2.22	65.17%	61.53%	−3.64	78.35%	75.37%	−2.98	76.38%	71.56%	−4.82
Castile and León	41.83%	38.12%	−3.71	63.94%	59.33%	−4.61	79.60%	75.08%	−4.52	77.66%	71.29%	−6.37
Castilla–La Mancha	42.65%	39.53%	−3.12	65.30%	61.71%	−3.59	80.64%	76.71%	−3.93	80.02%	75.76%	−4.26
Catalonia	39.31%	35.55%	−3.76	57.45%	53.21%	−4.24	71.22%	66.83%	−4.39	70.30%	65.16%	−5.14
Extremadura	43.82%	39.67%	−4.15	63.76%	59.60%	−4.16	79.68%	75.63%	−4.05	78.55%	73.91%	−4.64
Galicia	35.60%	32.87%	−2.73	60.73%	57.28%	−3.45	75.46%	71.82%	−3.64	70.48%	62.21%	−8.27
La Rioja	45.81%	41.88%	−3.93	65.08%	59.73%	−5.35	80.77%	75.88%	−4.89	79.29%	72.78%	−6.51
Madrid	41.67%	39.61%	−2.06	65.18%	61.33%	−3.85	80.88%	76.03%	−4.85	79.08%	73.26%	−5.82
Murcia	45.74%	42.50%	−3.24	67.46%	63.36%	−4.10	80.47%	75.53%	−4.94	79.58%	74.11%	−5.47
Navarre	42.72%	39.11%	−3.61	59.92%	55.82%	−4.10	73.25%	71.34%	−1.91	72.06%	68.91%	−3.15
Valencian Community	47.57%	43.95%	−3.62	66.74%	62.73%	−4.01	79.66%	75.50%	−4.16	78.84%	74.18%	−4.66
Ceuta	31.87%	26.63%	−5.24	49.81%	42.50%	−7.31	64.75%	55.05%	−9.70	63.32%	53.16%	−10.16
Melilla	31.08%	25.56%	−5.52	47.93%	40.08%	−7.85	66.59%	52.85%	−13.74	63.68%	49.43%	−14.25
Total	40.46%	37.88%	−2.58	60.95%	57.65%	−3.30	75.35%	71.71%	−3.64	73.85%	68.94%	−4.91

== Results ==
=== Congress of Deputies ===
← Summary of the 20 November 2011 Congress of Deputies election results →
Parties and alliances	Popular vote			Seats	
Parties and alliances	Votes	%	±pp	Total	+/−
People's Party (PP)^{1}	10,866,566	44.63	+4.52	186	+32
Spanish Socialist Workers' Party (PSOE)	7,003,511	28.76	−15.11	110	−59
United Left–The Greens: Plural Left (IU–LV)^{2}	1,686,040	6.92	+3.00	11	+9
Union, Progress and Democracy (UPyD)	1,143,225	4.70	+3.51	5	+4
Convergence and Union (CiU)	1,015,691	4.17	+1.14	16	+6
Amaiur (Amaiur)^{3}	334,498	1.37	+1.05	7	+7
Basque Nationalist Party (EAJ/PNV)	324,317	1.33	+0.14	5	−1
Republican Left (esquerra)	256,985	1.06	−0.10	3	±0
Equo (Equo)	216,748	0.89	New	0	±0
Galician Nationalist Bloc (BNG)	184,037	0.76	−0.07	2	±0
Canarian Coalition–New Canaries (CC–NC–PNC)^{4}	143,881	0.59	−0.24	2	±0
Bloc–Initiative–Greens–Equo: Commitment Coalition (Compromís–Q)^{5}	125,306	0.51	+0.39	1	+1
Animalist Party Against Mistreatment of Animals (PACMA)	102,144	0.42	+0.25	0	±0
Forum of Citizens (FAC)	99,473	0.41	New	1	+1
Blank Seats (EB)	97,673	0.40	+0.38	0	±0
Andalusian Party (PA)^{6}	76,999	0.32	+0.05	0	±0
Platform for Catalonia (PxC)	59,949	0.25	New	0	±0
Regionalist Party of Cantabria (PRC)	44,010	0.18	New	0	±0
Yes to the Future (GBai)^{7}	42,415	0.17	−0.07	1	±0
For a Fairer World (PUM+J)	27,210	0.11	+0.02	0	±0
Communist Party of the Peoples of Spain (PCPE)	26,254	0.11	+0.03	0	±0
Anti-capitalists (Anticapitalistas)	22,289	0.09	New	0	±0
Pirates of Catalonia (Pirata.cat)	21,876	0.09	New	0	±0
Communist Unification of Spain (UCE)	15,869	0.07	New	0	±0
Humanist Party (PH)	10,132	0.04	±0.00	0	±0
Spain 2000 (E–2000)	9,266	0.04	+0.01	0	±0
Internationalist Solidarity and Self-Management (SAIn)	6,863	0.03	+0.01	0	±0
Republicans (RPS)	5,430	0.02	New	0	±0
Hartos.org (Hartos.org)	3,820	0.02	New	0	±0
Pirate Party (Pirata)	3,426	0.01	New	0	±0
Canarian Nationalist Alternative (ANC)	3,180	0.01	+0.01	0	±0
Spanish Phalanx of the CNSO (FE de las JONS)	2,898	0.01	−0.04	0	±0
Liberal Democratic Centre (CDL)	2,848	0.01	±0.00	0	±0
Castilian Party (PCAS)^{8}	2,431	0.01	−0.01	0	±0
United for Valencia (UxV)^{9}	2,210	0.01	±0.00	0	±0
Individual Freedom Party (P–LIB)	2,065	0.01	New	0	±0
Regionalist Party of the Leonese Country (PREPAL)	2,058	0.01	+0.01	0	±0
Internationalist Socialist Workers' Party (POSI)	2,007	0.01	−0.02	0	±0
National Democracy (DN)	1,867	0.01	−0.04	0	±0
Regionalist Party for Eastern Andalusia (PRAO)	1,784	0.01	New	0	±0
Caballas Coalition (Caballas)	1,712	0.01	New	0	±0
XXI Convergence (C.XXI)	1,443	0.01	New	0	±0
Unity of the People (UP)	1,138	0.00	±0.00	0	±0
Convergence for Extremadura (CEx)	1,090	0.00	New	0	±0
Andecha Astur (Andecha)	1,087	0.00	−0.01	0	±0
Citizens of Democratic Centre (CCD)	1,074	0.00	New	0	±0
Citizens' Action for Málaga (ACIMA)	966	0.00	New	0	±0
Family and Life Party (PFyV)	829	0.00	−0.04	0	±0
Death to the System (+MAS+)	791	0.00	New	0	±0
Union of Independent Citizens of Toledo (UCIT)	785	0.00	New	0	±0
Let us Give the Change (DeC)	778	0.00	New	0	±0
Centre and Democracy Forum (CyD)	720	0.00	New	0	±0
Regionalist Unity of Castile and León (URCL)	709	0.00	±0.00	0	±0
Party for the Regeneration of Democracy in Spain (PRDE)	678	0.00	New	0	±0
Internet Party (Internet)	603	0.00	New	0	±0
Left Republican Party–Republicans (PRE–R)	419	0.00	New	0	±0
Enough is Enough, Open Grouping of Political Parties (Basta Ya)	380	0.00	New	0	±0
Constitutional and Democratic Party (PDyC)	304	0.00	New	0	±0
The Greens–Green Group (LV–GV)	293	0.00	−0.12	0	±0
Democratic Hygiene (HD)	206	0.00	New	0	±0
Socialists for Teruel (SxT)	169	0.00	New	0	±0
Navarrese and Spanish Right (DNE)	0	0.00	New	0	±0
Blank ballots	333,461	1.37	+0.26		
Total	24,348,886			350	±0
Valid votes	24,348,886	98.71	−0.65		
Invalid votes	317,555	1.29	+0.65		
Votes cast / turnout	24,666,441	68.94	−4.91		
Abstentions	11,113,050	31.06	+4.91		
Registered voters	35,779,491				
Sources
Footnotes: ^{1} People's Party results are compared to the combined totals of the People's Party, Aragonese Party and United Extremadura in the 2008 election.; ^{2} United Left–The Greens: Plural Left results are compared to the combined totals of United Left and Aragonese Union in the 2008 election.; ^{3} Amaiur results are compared to the combined totals of Basque Solidarity and Aralar in the 2008 election.; ^{4} Canarian Coalition–New Canaries results are compared to the combined totals of Canarian Coalition–Canarian Nationalist Party and New Canaries–Canarian Centre in the 2008 election.; ^{5} Bloc–Initiative–Greens–Equo: Commitment Coalition results are compared to Bloc–Initiative–Greens totals in the 2008 election.; ^{6} Andalusian Party results are compared to Andalusian Coalition totals in the 2008 election.; ^{7} Yes to the Future results are compared to Navarre Yes totals in the 2008 election.; ^{8} Castilian Party results are compared to Commoners' Land totals in the 2008 election.; ^{9} United for Valencia results are compared to Valencian Nationalist Option totals in the 2008 election.

Popular vote
PP	44.63%
PSOE	28.76%
IU–LV	6.92%
UPyD	4.70%
CiU	4.17%
Amaiur	1.37%
EAJ/PNV	1.33%
esquerra	1.06%
BNG	0.76%
CC–NC–PNC	0.59%
Compromís–Q	0.51%
FAC	0.41%
GBai	0.17%
Others	3.24%
Blank ballots	1.37%

Seats
PP	53.14%
PSOE	31.43%
CiU	4.57%
IU–LV	3.14%
Amaiur	2.00%
UPyD	1.43%
EAJ/PNV	1.43%
esquerra	0.86%
BNG	0.57%
CC–NC–PNC	0.57%
Compromís–Q	0.29%
FAC	0.29%
GBai	0.29%

=== Senate ===
← Summary of the 20 November 2011 Senate of Spain election results →
Parties and alliances	Popular vote			Seats	
Parties and alliances	Votes	%	±pp	Total	+/−
People's Party (PP)^{1}	29,363,775	46.31	+5.90	136	+35
Spanish Socialist Workers' Party (PSOE)	16,469,470	25.97	−11.25	48	−38
United Left–The Greens: Plural Left (IU–LV)^{2}	3,234,188	5.10	+2.06	0	±0
Agreement for Catalonia Progress (PSC–ICV–EUiA)	2,842,651	4.48	−3.09	7	−5
Convergence and Union (CiU)	2,590,266	4.09	+0.60	9	+5
Union, Progress and Democracy (UPyD)	1,060,766	1.67	+0.68	0	±0
Amaiur (Amaiur)^{3}	953,349	1.50	+1.18	3	+3
Basque Nationalist Party (EAJ/PNV)	928,724	1.46	+0.17	4	+2
Republican Left (esquerra)	665,554	1.05	+1.01	0	±0
Galician Nationalist Bloc (BNG)	593,076	0.94	−0.10	0	±0
Blank Seats (EB)	517,733	0.82	+0.80	0	±0
Equo (Equo)	516,150	0.81	New	0	±0
Animalist Party Against Mistreatment of Animals (PACMA)	374,483	0.59	+0.40	0	±0
Bloc–Initiative–Greens–Equo: Commitment Coalition (Compromís–Q)^{5}	306,260	0.48	+0.35	0	±0
Forum of Citizens (FAC)	286,394	0.45	New	0	±0
Canarian Coalition–New Canaries–Canarian Nationalist Party (CC–NC–PNC)^{4}	264,803	0.42	−0.10	1	±0
Andalusian Party (PA)^{6}	261,330	0.41	+0.08	0	±0
Platform for Catalonia (PxC)	139,925	0.22	New	0	±0
Regionalist Party of Cantabria (PRC)	102,109	0.16	New	0	±0
Yes to the Future (GBai)^{7}	96,978	0.15	−0.11	0	±0
For a Fairer World (PUM+J)	96,771	0.15	−0.04	0	±0
Pirates of Catalonia (Pirata.cat)	90,652	0.14	New	0	±0
Communist Party of the Peoples of Spain (PCPE)	78,440	0.12	+0.02	0	±0
Communist Unification of Spain (UCE)	42,353	0.07	New	0	±0
Humanist Party (PH)	35,693	0.06	±0.00	0	±0
Spain 2000 (E–2000)	29,927	0.05	+0.02	0	±0
Assembly for the Senate (ASRM)	29,762	0.05	New	0	±0
Internationalist Solidarity and Self-Management (SAIn)	24,505	0.04	+0.01	0	±0
Liberal Democratic Centre (CDL)	13,935	0.02	+0.01	0	±0
Hartos.org (Hartos.org)	13,395	0.02	New	0	±0
Castilian Party (PCAS)^{8}	12,552	0.02	−0.01	0	±0
Leonese People's Union (UPL)	10,407	0.02	−0.01	0	±0
Spanish Phalanx of the CNSO (FE de las JONS)	10,028	0.02	−0.04	0	±0
Regionalist Party of the Leonese Country (PREPAL)	7,955	0.01	±0.00	0	±0
Individual Freedom Party (P–LIB)	7,455	0.01	New	0	±0
Citizens' Action for Málaga (ACIMA)	6,298	0.01	New	0	±0
United for Valencia (UxV)^{9}	5,033	0.01	±0.00	0	±0
Internationalist Socialist Workers' Party (POSI)	4,979	0.01	−0.03	0	±0
Andecha Astur (Andecha)	4,740	0.01	±0.00	0	±0
Convergence for Extremadura (CEx)	4,564	0.01	New	0	±0
National Democracy (DN)	4,563	0.01	−0.03	0	±0
Regionalist Party for Eastern Andalusia (PRAO)	3,921	0.01	New	0	±0
Regionalist Unity of Castile and León (URCL)	3,612	0.01	+0.01	0	±0
Let us Give the Change (DeC)	3,250	0.01	New	0	±0
Caballas Coalition (Caballas)	3,226	0.01	New	0	±0
Union of Independent Citizens of Toledo (UCIT)	3,164	0.00	New	0	±0
Party for the Regeneration of Democracy in Spain (PRDE)	3,153	0.00	New	0	±0
Citizens of Democratic Centre (CCD)	2,730	0.00	New	0	±0
XXI Convergence (C.XXI)	2,705	0.00	New	0	±0
Centre and Democracy Forum (CyD)	2,462	0.00	New	0	±0
Unity of the People (UP)	2,454	0.01	+0.01	0	±0
Family and Life Party (PFyV)	1,974	0.00	−0.06	0	±0
Enough is Enough, Open Grouping of Political Parties (Basta Ya)	1,892	0.00	New	0	±0
Socialist Party of Menorca–Nationalist Agreement (PSM–EN)	1,733	0.00	New	0	±0
Republicans (RPS)	1,116	0.00	New	0	±0
Feminist Initiative (IFem)	1,115	0.00	New	0	±0
Left Republican Party–Republicans (PRE–R)	940	0.00	New	0	±0
Navarrese and Spanish Right (DNE)	903	0.00	New	0	±0
The Greens–Green Group (LV–GV)	732	0.00	−0.16	0	±0
Socialists for Teruel (SxT)	446	0.00	New	0	±0
PSOE–Ibiza for Change (PSOE–ExC)	n/a	n/a	−0.04	0	−1
PSOE–Left of Menorca–PSM–Greens (PSOE–EU–PSM–Verds)	n/a	n/a	−0.03	0	−1
Blank ballots (Note: The percentage of blank ballots is calculated over the official number of valid votes cast, irrespective of the total number of votes shown as a result of adding up the individual results for each party.)	1,264,947	5.36	+3.30		
Total	63,408,466			208	±0
Valid votes	23,578,950	96.30	−1.41		
Invalid votes	904,722	3.70	+1.41		
Votes cast / turnout	24,483,672	68.43	−6.06		
Abstentions	11,295,819	31.57	+6.06		
Registered voters	35,779,491				
Sources
Footnotes: ^{1} People's Party results are compared to the combined totals of the People's Party, Aragonese Party and United Extremadura in the 2008 election.; ^{2} United Left–The Greens: Plural Left results are compared to the combined totals of United Left and Aragonese Union in the 2008 election.; ^{3} Amaiur results are compared to the combined totals of Basque Solidarity and Aralar in the 2008 election.; ^{4} Canarian Coalition–New Canaries–Canarian Nationalist Party results are compared to the combined totals of Canarian Coalition–Canarian Nationalist Party and New Canaries–Canarian Centre in the 2008 election.; ^{5} Bloc–Initiative–Greens–Equo: Commitment Coalition results are compared to Bloc–Initiative–Greens totals in the 2008 election.; ^{6} Andalusian Party results are compared to Andalusian Coalition totals in the 2008 election.; ^{7} Yes to the Future results are compared to Navarre Yes totals in the 2008 election.; ^{8} Castilian Party results are compared to Commoners' Land totals in the 2008 election.; ^{9} United for Valencia results are compared to Valencian Nationalist Option totals in the 2008 election.

Popular vote
PP	46.31%
PSOE	25.97%
IU–LV	5.10%
EPdC	4.48%
CiU	4.09%
UPyD	1.67%
Amaiur	1.50%
EAJ/PNV	1.46%
esquerra	1.05%
CC–NC–PNC	0.42%
Others	5.95%
Blank ballots	5.36%

Seats
PP	65.38%
PSOE	23.08%
CiU	4.33%
EPdC	3.37%
EAJ/PNV	1.92%
Amaiur	1.44%
CC–NC–PNC	0.48%

=== Maps ===
Election results by constituency (Congress).

Vote winner strength by constituency (Congress).

Vote winner strength by autonomous community (Congress).

== Aftermath ==
=== Outcome ===
With an overall voter turnout of 68.9%—the lowest in a decade—the Spanish Socialist Workers' Party (PSOE) suffered its worst ever defeat in a general election, while also scoring one of the worst electoral performances for a ruling party in Spain since the UCD collapse in the 1982 election. The People's Party (PP) was able to win an historic absolute majority with 186 out of 350 seats—the largest obtained by a party since 1982—after almost eight years in opposition. The PSOE went on to finish below first place in all but two provinces—Barcelona and Seville—while also losing both Andalusia and Catalonia, which up to that point had been carried by the PSOE in every general election. The 2011 Spanish election marked the continuation of a string of severe government election losses across European countries since the start of the 2008 financial crisis, including Iceland, Greece, Hungary, the United Kingdom, Ireland or Portugal.

Minoritary national parties, such as United Left (IU) and Union, Progress and Democracy (UPyD), benefitted greatly from the PSOE collapse, winning 11 and 5 seats respectively—2 and 1 in the previous parliament. This was the first time since the 1989 election than more than one of the smaller nationwide-contesting parties obtained more than 1 million votes in a general election, as well as enough seats to form parliamentary groups on their own right. The PSOE collapse also resulted in nearly all parties winning parliamentary presence in the Congress of Deputies increasing their vote shares—only Republican Left of Catalonia (ERC) and Geroa Bai (GBai) lost votes compared to 2008. The Basque Nationalist Party (PNV) lost 1 seat despite scoring higher than in 2008, but this came as a result of Amaiur's irruption, with 6 out of its 7 seats being elected in the Basque Country.

Convergence and Union (CiU), the party federation formed by Democratic Convergence of Catalonia (CDC) and Democratic Union of Catalonia (UDC), was elected to an historic general election victory in the region of Catalonia. The Socialists' Party of Catalonia (PSC), PSOE's sister party in the region—which had, up until that point, been the first Catalan political force in every general election held since 1977—scored a poor showing by finishing in second place with 27% of the vote. The 2011 election would be the last time both parties would dominate the Catalan political landscape in a general election; the next election, held on 20 December 2015, would see the alliance between CDC and UDC broken and the PSC being crushed to third place regionally by both the En Comú Podem alliance and ERC.

In terms of vote share, PSOE's electoral result, with 28.76%, would remain the worst electoral performance for a sitting Spanish government in a nationwide-held election since 1982 until the 2014 European Parliament election held two and a half years later, when the PP obtained 26.09% of the share, and in a general election until 2015—the PP obtaining 28.71%.

=== Government formation ===
Investiture; Congress of Deputies; Nomination of Mariano Rajoy (PP)
Ballot →	20 December 2011
Required majority →	176 out of 350
Yes: • PP (185); • FAC (1); • UPN (1)	187 / 350
No: • PSOE (110); • CiU (16); • IU–ICV–CHA (11); • UPyD (5); • ERC (3); • BNG (2); • Compromís (1); • GBai (1)	149 / 350
Abstentions: • Amaiur (7); • PNV (5); • CC (1); • NC (1)	14 / 350
Absentees	0 / 350

== Bibliography ==
Legislation

- Constitución Española (Constitution). Official State Gazette (in Spanish). 27 December 1978 [version as of 27 September 2011]. BOE-A-1978-31229.
- Ley Orgánica 5/1985, de 19 de junio, del Régimen Electoral General (Organic Law 5/1985). Official State Gazette (in Spanish). 19 June 1985 [version as of 16 July 2011]. BOE-A-1985-11672.
- Ley 19/2011, de 5 de julio, por la que pasan a denominarse oficialmente "Araba/Álava", "Gipuzkoa" y "Bizkaia" las demarcaciones provinciales llamadas anteriormente "Álava", "Guipúzcoa" y "Vizcaya" (Law 19/2011). Official State Gazette (in Spanish). 5 July 2011. BOE-A-2011-11606.
- Real Decreto 1329/2011, de 26 de septiembre, de disolución del Congreso de los Diputados y del Senado y de convocatoria de elecciones (Royal Decree 1329/2011). Official State Gazette (in Spanish). 26 September 2011. BOE-A-2011-15160.

Other

- Carreras de Odriozola, Albert; Tafunell Sambola, Xavier (2005) [1989]. Estadísticas históricas de España, siglos XIX-XX (PDF) (in Spanish). Vol. 1 (II ed.). Bilbao: Fundación BBVA. pp. 1072–1097. ISBN 84-96515-00-1. Archived from the original (PDF) on 24 September 2015.
- Whitfield, Teresa (December 2015). Special Report 384. The Basque Conflict and ETA. The Difficulties of an Ending (PDF) (Report). United States Institute of Peace.
- Sangrador-Vegas, Begoña (2020). "PSOE (2004-2011): Social Reforms and the Beginning of the Economic Crisis". The Nation in Its Labyrinth: An Introduction to Contemporary Spain since 1898 (in Spanish). Madrid: Pressbooks.
