= State of alarm =

State of alarm may refer to:

- State of emergency, an official announcement the authorities of an ongoing emergency
- State of alarm (Spain), a nationally declared emergency in Spain
- State of alarm (Venezuela), a nationally declared emergency in Venezuela
