= Iñaki Antigüedad =

Basque politician and geologist

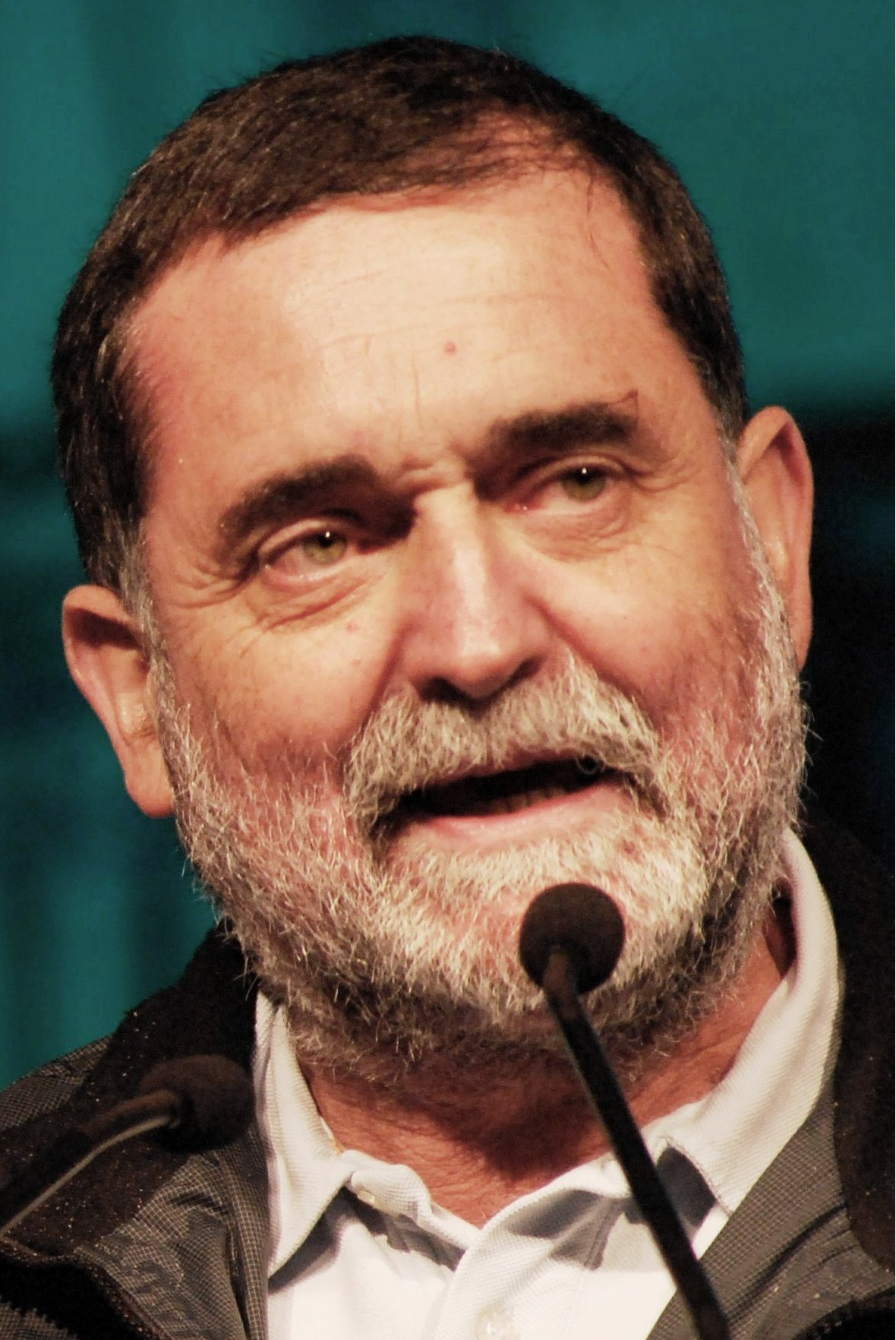

Leader of Amaiur
- Incumbent
- Assumed office 27 September 2011

Member of the Congress of Deputies
- In office 20 November 2011 – 16 May 2012
- Constituency: Vizcaya

Personal details
- Born: 1955 (age 70–71) Bilbao, Basque Country
- Profession: Geologist

Iñaki Antigüedad Auzmendi (born 1955, Bilbao) is a Basque geologist and politician. He is professor of hydrogeology at the University of the Basque Country, and leader of Amaiur.

Following the strong performance of Amaiur in the 2011 Spanish general election, Antigüedad is leading a campaign to hold a referendum on Basque independence.

== See also ==
- 2008 Basque referendum
