= 2011 Spanish elections =

2011 Spanish elections may refer to one of two nationwide elections held in Spain on 22 May 2011:

- 2011 Spanish local elections, to elect local seats in Spanish municipalities, provinces and island councils.
- 2011 Spanish regional elections, to elect the regional parliaments of thirteen autonomous communities.

For the Spanish general election held in the same year, see 2011 Spanish general election.
