= Amaiur =

- Founded: 27 September 2011
- Dissolved: 27 October 2015
- Succeeded by: EH Bildu
- Ideology: Basque nationalism; Left-wing nationalism (Abertzale left); Basque independence; Socialism
- Political position: Left-wing
- Colors: Teal
- Members: See list of members

Website
- www.amaiur.info

Amaiur was a left-wing Basque nationalist and separatist political coalition from the Basque Country and Navarre. The name of the coalition comes from the fortress of Amaiur in Navarre, which was one of the last Basque strongholds during the Spanish conquest of Iberian Navarre.

Amaiur was launched on 27 September 2011 by Eusko Alkartasuna, Alternatiba (which had both been part of Bildu), Aralar (previously in alliance with the Basque Nationalist Party, PNV in Nafarroa Bai), independent individuals of the abertzale left (including many former members of Batasuna), and other smaller groups, while the PNV refused to join. The new coalition fielded candidates for the 2011 general election in all three Basque provinces and Navarre. Amaiur won seven seats in the Congress of Deputies and three in the Senate.

At the 2015 Spanish general election, Amaiur was replaced as the representative of the left-wing Basque nationalist camp by EH Bildu that had already run in earlier local, Basque Country and European elections. It came off much weaker than Amaiur in 2011, winning only two seats in the Congress of Deputies and one Senator, although it would later see growth.

== Composition ==
Party	Notes
Create (Sortu)	As independents until its legalization in June 2012.
Basque Solidarity (EA)	
Aralar (Aralar)	
Alternative (Alternatiba)	

== Electoral performance ==
=== Cortes Generales ===
==== Nationwide ====
Cortes Generales
Election	Congress					Senate		Leading candidate	Status in legislature
Election	Votes	%	#	Seats	+/–	Seats	+/–	Leading candidate	Status in legislature
2011	334,498	1.37%	6th	7 / 350	7	2 / 208	2	Iñaki Antigüedad	Opposition

==== Regional breakdown ====
Election	Basque Country									
Election	Congress					Senate				
Election	Votes	%	#	Seats	+/–	Votes		%	Seats	+/–
2011	285,290	24.11%	2nd	6 / 18	6	Candidates 1 Candidates 2 Candidates 3	274,980; 269,998; 265,198	23.71% 23.28% 22.86%	3 / 12	3

Election	Navarre									
Election	Congress					Senate				
Election	Votes	%	#	Seats	+/–	Votes		%	Seats	+/–
2011	49,208	14.86%	3rd	1 / 5	1	Maite Juliana Iturre Llano; Joseba Compains Silva; Arturo Goldaracena Asa	49,609; 47,333; 46,231	15.52% 14.81% 14.47%	0 / 4	0
