= 2008 PP national party congress =

- 20−22 June 2008

3,025 delegates in the National Congress Plurality needed to win
- Opinion polls
- Turnout: 2,643 (87.4%) (executive); 2,638 (87.2%) (board)
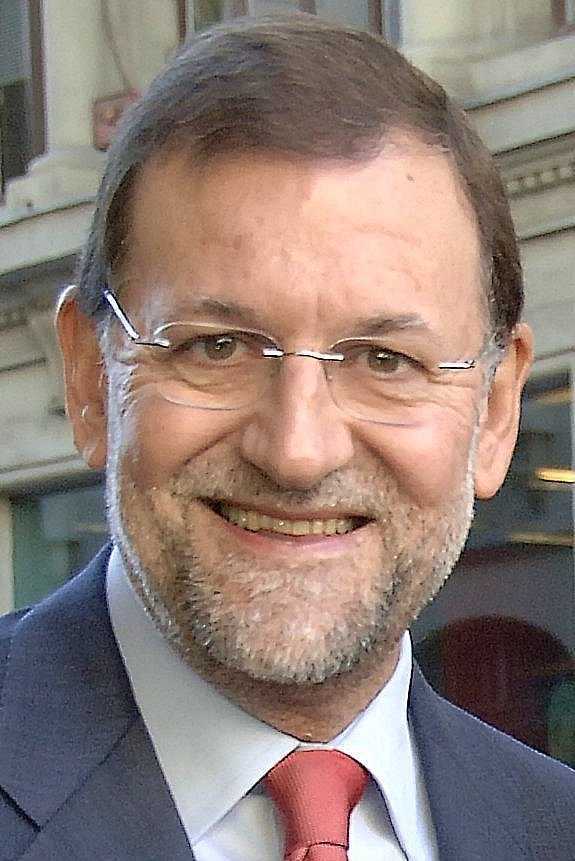

Candidate	Mariano Rajoy	Blank ballots
Delegate vote	2,187 (84.2%)	409 (15.8%)
Board	2,177 (84.1%)	413 (15.9%)
President before election
Mariano Rajoy
Elected President
Mariano Rajoy

The People's Party (PP) held its 16th national congress in Valencia from 20 to 22 June 2008, to renovate its governing bodies—including the post of president, which amounted to that of party leader—and establish the party platform and policy until the next congress. It saw Mariano Rajoy being re-elected unopposed for a second term as party president, with 84.2% of the delegate vote in the congress (2,187 votes) and 15.8% of blank ballots (409).

== Overview ==
The congress of the PP was the party's supreme body, and could be of either ordinary or extraordinary nature, depending on whether it was held following the natural end of its term or due to any other exceptional circumstances not linked to this event. Ordinary congresses were to be held every three years and called at least two months in advance of their celebration. Extraordinary congresses had to be called by a two-thirds majority of the Board of Directors at least one-and-a-half month in advance of their celebration, though in cases of "exceptional urgency" this deadline could be reduced to 30 days.

The president of the PP was the party's head and the person holding the party's political and legal representation, and presided over its board of directors and executive committee, which were the party's maximum directive, governing and administration bodies between congresses. The election of the PP president was based on an indirect system, with party members voting for delegates who would, in turn, elect the president. Any party member was eligible for the post of party president, on the condition that they were up to date with the payment of party fees and were proposed by at least 20% of congress delegates.

== Timetable ==
The key dates are listed below (all times are CEST. Note that the Canary Islands use WEST (UTC+1) instead):

- 31 March: Official announcement of the congress.
- 21–22 April: Election of congress delegates.
- 20–22 June: Party congress.

== Candidates ==
Candidate	Notable positions	Announced	Ref.
=== Proclaimed ===
Candidates who met endorsement requirements and were officially proclaimed to contest the party congress.
Mariano Rajoy (age 53)	President of the PP (since 2004); Leader of the Opposition of Spain (since 2004); Member of the Congress of Deputies for Madrid (since 2004); Secretary-General of the PP (2003–2004); Member of the Congress of Deputies for Pontevedra (1986 and 1989–2004); Spokesperson of the Government of Spain (2002–2003); Minister of the Presidency of Spain (2000–2001 and 2002–2003); First Deputy Prime Minister of Spain (2000–2003); Deputy Secretary-General of the PP (1990–2003); Minister of the Interior of Spain (2001–2002); Minister of Education and Culture of Spain (1999–2000); Minister of Public Administrations of Spain (1996–1999); President of AP/PP in the province of Pontevedra (1983–1986 and 1987–1991); Vice President of the Xunta de Galicia (1986–1987); President of the Provincial Deputation of Pontevedra (1983–1986); City Councillor of Pontevedra (1983–1986); Member of the Parliament of Galicia for Pontevedra (1981–1985); Director-General for Institutional Relations of Galicia (1982)	11 March 2008	

=== Declined ===
The individuals in this section were the subject of speculation about their possible candidacy, but publicly denied or recanted interest in running:

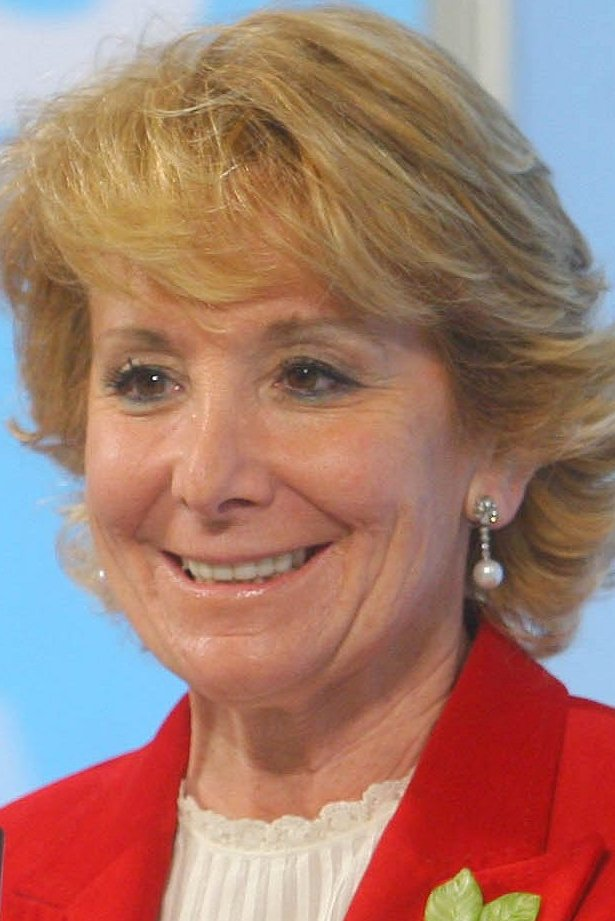
Esperanza Aguirre

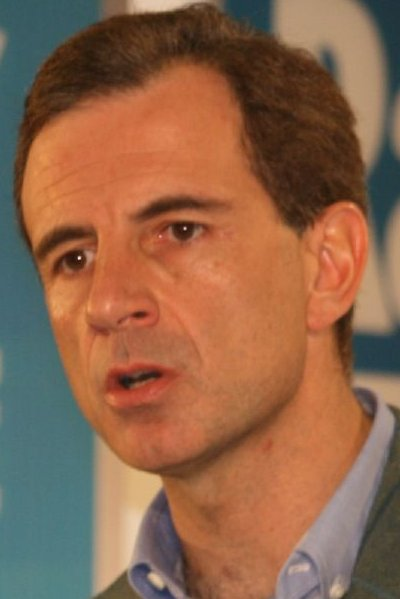
Juan Costa

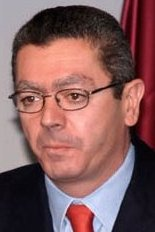
Alberto Ruiz-Gallardón

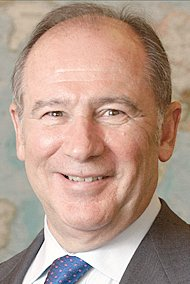
Rodrigo Rato
- Esperanza Aguirre (age 56) — President of the PP of the Community of Madrid (since 2004); President of the Community of Madrid (since 2003); Member of the Assembly of Madrid (since 2003); Spokesperson of the People's Group in the Assembly of Madrid (2003); Senator for Madrid (1996–2003); President of the Senate of Spain (1999–2002); Minister of Education and Culture of Spain (1996–1999); First Deputy Mayor of Madrid (1995–1996); Spokesperson of the People's Group in Madrid (1995–1996); City Councillor of Madrid (1983–1996).
- Juan Costa (age 43) — Member of the Congress of Deputies for Castellón (1993–1996, 2000, 2004 and since 2008); Minister of Science and Technology of Spain (2003–2004); Secretary of State of Trade and Tourism of Spain (2000–2003); President of the Spanish Tax Agency (1996–2000); Secretary of State of Finance of Spain (1996–2000).
- Alberto Ruiz-Gallardón (age 49) — Mayor of Madrid (since 2003); City Councillor of Madrid (1983–1987 and since 2003); President of the Community of Madrid (1995–2003); Member of the Assembly of Madrid (1987–2003); Spokesperson of the People's Parliamentary Group in the Senate (1993–1995); Senator appointed by the Assembly of Madrid (1987–1995); Spokesperson of the People's Group in the Assembly of Madrid (1987–1993); Vice President of AP (1987–1989); Secretary-General of AP (1986–1987).
- Rodrigo Rato (age 59) — Managing Director of the International Monetary Fund (2004–2007); First Deputy Prime Minister of Spain (2003–2004); Deputy Secretary-General of the PP (1996–2004); Member of the Congress of Deputies for Madrid (1989–2004); Second Deputy Prime Minister for Economic Affairs of Spain (2000–2003); Minister of Economy of Spain (2000–2003); Second Deputy Prime Minister of Spain (1996–2000); Minister of Economy and Finance of Spain (1996–2000); Spokesperson of the People's Parliamentary Group in the Congress (1989–1996); Member of the Congress of Deputies for Cádiz (1982–1989).

== Endorsements ==
Candidates seeking to run were required to collect the endorsements of at least 20% of congress delegates.

Summary of candidate endorsement results
Candidate	Delegates		
Candidate	Count	% T	% V
Mariano Rajoy	>2,000	>66.12	100.00
Total	>2,000		
Valid endorsements	>2,000	>66.12	
Not endorsing	<1,025	<33.88	
Total members	3,025		

== Opinion polls ==
Poll results are listed in the tables below in reverse chronological order, showing the most recent first, and using the date the survey's fieldwork was done, as opposed to the date of publication. If such date is unknown, the date of publication is given instead. The highest percentage figure in each polling survey is displayed in bold, and the background shaded in the candidate's colour. In the instance of a tie, the figures with the highest percentages are shaded.

=== PP voters ===
Polling firm/Commissioner	Fieldwork date	Sample size								Other /None	Question	Lead
Polling firm/Commissioner	Fieldwork date	Sample size	Rajoy (Inc.)	Aguirre	Gallardón	Rato	Costa	Camps	Aznar	Other /None	Question	Lead
Obradoiro de Socioloxía/Público	16 Jun 2008	1,000	–	13.7	**26.8**	8.2	1.3	–	–	12.8	37.2	13.1
Opina/Cadena SER	12 Jun 2008	1,000	15.4	18.8	**29.7**	27.0	2.0	2.0	–	1.7	3.4	2.7
Sigma Dos/El Mundo	10–12 Jun 2008	1,000	21.7	9.3	**31.8**	24.2	0.9	–	–	12.1		7.6
Sigma Dos/El Mundo	24–25 Apr 2008	1,000	**25.8**	14.5	25.4	18.4	–	–	–	15.9		0.4
InvyMark/laSexta	20 Apr 2008	?	**45.9**	32.5	–	–	–	–	–	–	21.6	13.4
Opina/Cadena SER	28 Feb 2008	?	–	14.0	**26.0**	15.0	–	–	4.0	41.0		11.0

=== Spanish voters ===
Polling firm/Commissioner	Fieldwork date	Sample size							Other /None	Question	Lead
Polling firm/Commissioner	Fieldwork date	Sample size	Rajoy (Inc.)	Aguirre	Gallardón	Rato	Costa	Camps	Other /None	Question	Lead
Opina/Cadena SER	12 Jun 2008	1,000	11.4	11.2	**44.9**	16.2	2.0	1.4	2.2	10.7	28.7
Sigma Dos/El Mundo	10–12 Jun 2008	1,000	13.9	7.5	**41.0**	15.9	0.8	–	20.9		25.1
InvyMark/laSexta	20 Apr 2008	?	**35.3**	29.3	–	–	–	–	–	35.4	6.0
Opina/Cadena SER	28 Feb 2008	?	–	8.0	**38.0**	8.0	–	–	46.0		30.0
Opina/Cadena SER	29 Aug 2007	1,000	15.0	–	**44.0**	25.0	–	–	–	16.0	19.0

== Results ==
Summary of the 21 June 2008 PP congress results
Candidate	Executive		Board	
Candidate	Votes	%	Votes	%
Mariano Rajoy	2,187	84.24	2,177	84.05
Blank ballots	409	15.76	413	15.95
Total	2,596		2,590	
Valid votes	2,596	98.22	2,590	98.18
Invalid votes	47	1.78	48	1.82
Votes cast / turnout	2,643	87.37	2,638	87.21
Abstentions	382	12.63	387	12.79
Total delegates	3,025		3,025	

Vote by delegates (Executive)
Rajoy	84.24%
Blank ballots	15.76%

Vote by delegates (Board)
Rajoy	84.05%
Blank ballots	15.95%
