= State of alarm (Spain) =

Situation in which a Spanish Government is empowered to perform special actions

In Spain the state of alarm (estado de alarma) is the lowest of the three degrees of state of emergency that allows the government to perform actions or impose policies that it would normally not be permitted to undertake. It is regulated in the article 116.2 of the Constitution of Spain.

It can be declared in all of Spain or parts of it in these cases:

- Serious risk, catastrophe or public calamity, such as earthquakes, floods, urban and forest fires, or major accidents.
- Health crises, such as epidemics and serious contamination situations.
- Situations of shortages of basic necessity products.
- Paralysis of essential public services for the community if any of the above circumstances or situations concur.

The state of alarm is declared by the government through a decree passed by the Council of Ministers for a maximum period of 15 days, reporting to the Congress of Deputies, gathered immediately for this purpose. Without the Congress authorization said period may not be extended, and said decree will establish the scope and conditions binding during its duration. The decree will determine the territorial scope to which the effects of the declaration extend.

The limitation of rights is regulated in the organic law 4/1981. The allowed limitations are:

- Limitation of movement or permanence of people or vehicles at certain times and places, or order them to meet certain requirements
- Practice of temporary searches of all kinds of goods and imposition of civil conscription
- Intervention and temporarily occupation of industries, factories, workshops, farms or locals of any nature, reporting it to the concerned Ministries.
- The use of services or the consumption of basic necessities may be limited or rationed
- The necessary orders may be issued to ensure the supply of the markets and the performance of the affected services and production centers

== Declared states of alarm ==
=== 2010 air traffic controllers strike ===
On December 4, 2010, the first state of alarm was declared following the air traffic controllers strike. It lasted until January 16, 2011 and was the first time since the Francisco Franco's regime that a state of emergency was declared.

=== 2020 coronavirus pandemic in Spain ===
The second state of alarm was declared on March 14, 2020, due to the coronavirus pandemic. It enforced the lockdown of people in all Spanish territory. It ended on June 21, 2020.

The third state of alarm was declared on October 7, 2020 due to the second wave of COVID-19 in Madrid. This time, restrictions were not as big as in the previous state of alarm, and they only took place in the territory of the Madrid Autonomous Community.

The first-ever national state of emergency was decreed on October 25, 2020, primarily to introduce a curfew from 22:00 until six in the morning in order to tackle the widespread between young people in social gatherings.

Subsequently, the Constitutional Court of Spain ruled that both COVID states of alarm had been unconstitutional.
