= Plural Left (Spain, 2011) =

United Left–The Greens: The Plural Left Izquierda Unida–Los Verdes: La Izquierda Plural
- Leader: Cayo Lara
- Founded: 2011
- Dissolved: 2015
- Succeeded by: Popular Unity
- Ideology: Democratic socialism Eco-socialism; Anti-capitalism; Ecologism; Federalism
- Political position: Left-wing
- Colours: Dark red Green

United Left–The Greens: Plural Left (Spanish: Izquierda Unida–Los Verdes: La Izquierda Plural) or just Plural Left (Spanish: La Izquierda Plural) was an electoral alliance organized to contest the 2011 Spanish general election. It was led by United Left, with Cayo Lara as its leading candidate.

== Composition ==
Party	Notes
United Left (IU)	
Initiative for Catalonia Greens (ICV)	Within ICV–EUiA.
United and Alternative Left (EUiA)	Within ICV–EUiA.
Aragonese Union (CHA)	
Independent Socialists of Extremadura (SIEx)	
Assembly (Batzarre)	Within Left.
Confederation of the Greens (LV)	
Tour Madrid–The Greens (GM–LV)	
The Greens of the Valencian Country (EVPV)	
The Greens–Green Option (EV–OV)	
Canaries for the Left	Within CVR.
El Hierro Initiative (IpH)	
Democratic and Social Party of Ceuta (PDSC)	

== Electoral performance ==
=== Cortes Generales ===
Cortes Generales
Election	Leading candidate	Congress			Senate			Gov.
Election	Leading candidate	Votes	%	Seats	Votes	%	Seats	Gov.
2011	Cayo Lara	1,686,040	6.9 (#3)	11 / 350	3,234,188	5.1 (#3)	0 / 208	No
