= Spanish air traffic controllers' strike =

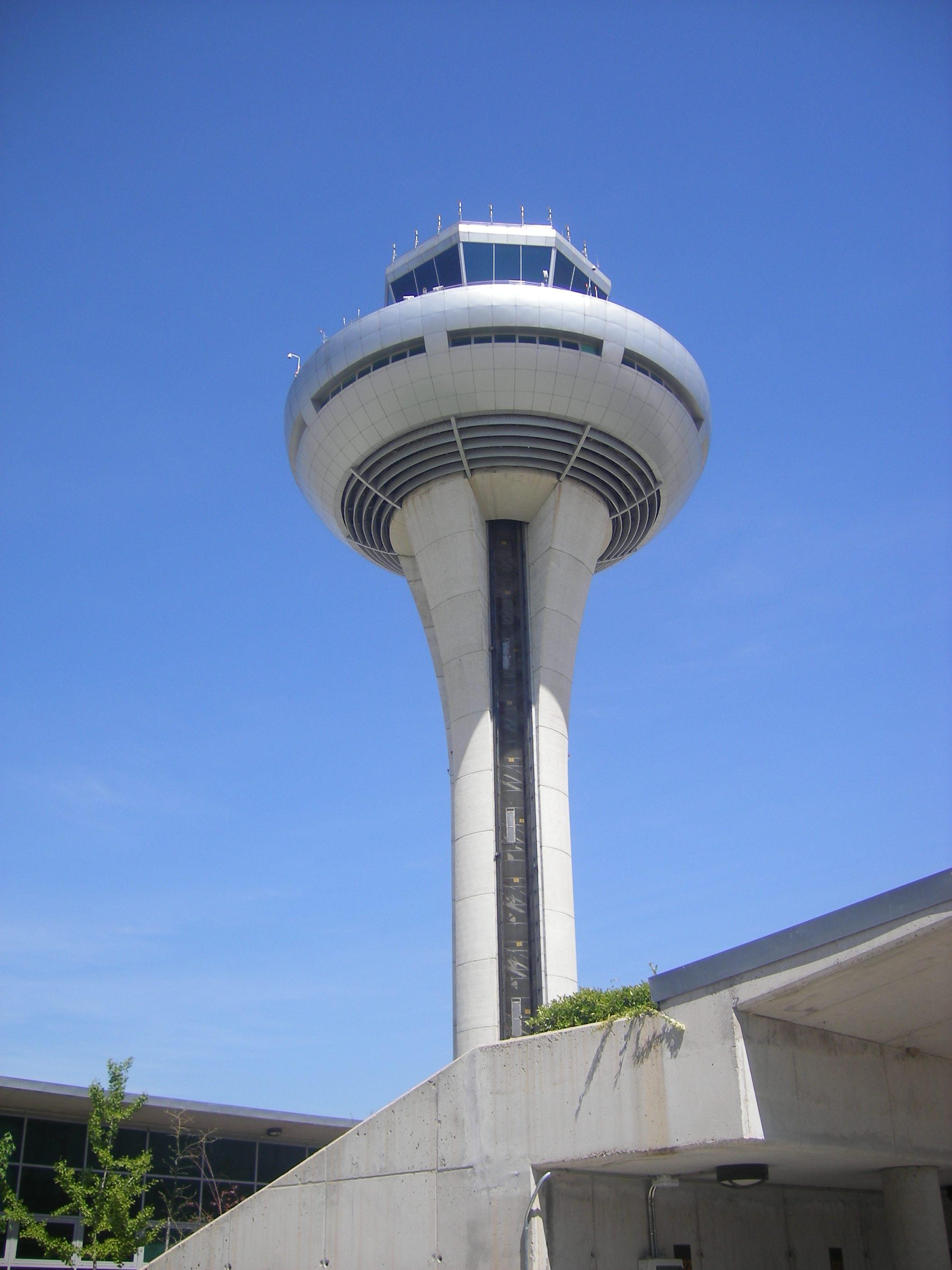
Control tower in Terminal 4 in the Madrid-Barajas airport

The Spanish air traffic controllers strike began on December 3, 2010, when the social-democratic Government of José Luis Rodríguez Zapatero declared rate 0, effectively forcing a National Air Navigation Lock-Out. The government portrayed air traffic controllers in Spanish airports (and in other units) as having engaged in a coordinated wildcat strike. Following that lockout, the Spanish Government authorized the Spanish military forces to escort air traffic controllers in order to continue operations in a total of eight airports, including the country's two main airports, Madrid-Barajas and Barcelona-El Prat. On the morning of December 4, the government declared a 'State of Alert', conscripting the controllers back to work supervised by the military forces and under the military law, instead of the civil law.

The move by the Spanish Government came after a year of dispute with the air traffic controllers and the Spanish airport authority Aena over working conditions, work schedules and benefits. According to some sources, air traffic controllers could earn up to 350,000 euros per annum, a claim that has been hotly disputed. This meant that the controllers did not receive much sympathy in Spain. On the same day as the lock-out, the Spanish Council of Ministers approved plans to partially privatise Aena.

The use of emergency powers was the first time since the restoration of democracy in 1975 that a state of alert had been called. Under the measure, controllers were escorted by armed guards and faced arrest for the crime of disobedience, stipulated in the Spanish military penal code in case of not showing up at work. Some controllers reported to have been forced to work at gunpoint.

The use of this measure by the Spanish government has been severely criticised by ATCEUC (Air Traffic Controllers European Unions Coordination) through a press release. And also by judge Juan Antonio Vázquez Taín:

Aena's unilateral decision to close the airspace in December 2010 is not directly or indirectly attributable to the air traffic controllers who limit themselves to complying with a rule that sets the maximum number of hours they can work

— Juan Antonio Vázquez Taín, Investigating court 2 of Santiago.

== See also ==
- Professional Air Traffic Controllers Organization (1968)
