= United for Valencia =

United for Valencia Units per València
- President: Manuel Lapuente Monedero
- Secretary: Ana Calatayud Tortosa
- Founded: 2007
- Headquarters: C/ Guillem de Castro, 165, 46006, Valencia
- Ideology: Valencian nationalism Regionalism; Liberalism; Progressivism
- Political position: Centre
- Local Government in the Valencian Community: #F8F9FA

Website
- unitsxvalencia.com

United for Valencia (Valencian: Units per València, UxV) is a Valencian political party initially founded as an electoral alliance in 2007 by elements from Valencian Union—namely, the Valencian Nationalist Option and Valencian Nationalist Left.

In 2013, they promoted the "Centre Democràtic Valencià." The aim was to create a reformist and democratic political party. It was presented later on, as the "Demòcrates Valencians".
