= Results of the 1986 Spanish Congress election =

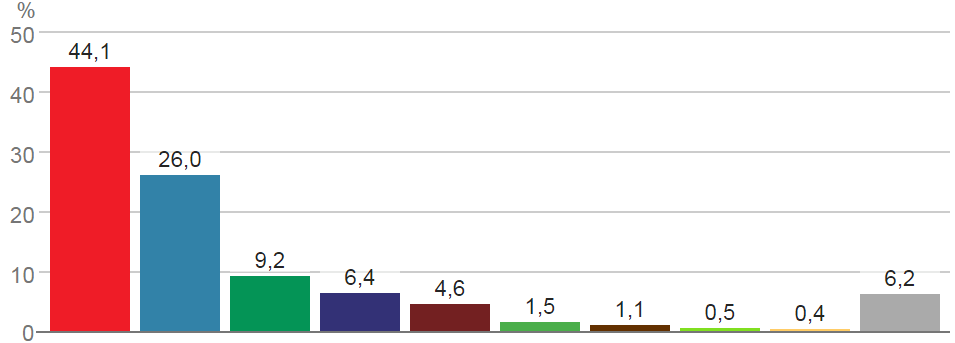
| (Spain) | Main: 1986 Spanish general election |
← 1982 22 June 1986 1989 →
| Party | | Votes | % | Seats |
| | PSOE | 8,901,718 | 44.1% | 184 |
| | AP–PDP–PL | 5,247,677 | 26.0% | 105 |
| | CDS | 1,861,912 | 9.2% | 19 |
| | PRD–CiU–CG | 1,288,768 | 6.4% | 19 |
| | IU | 935,504 | 4.6% | 7 |
| | EAJ/PNV | 309,610 | 1.5% | 6 |
| | HB | 231,722 | 1.1% | 5 |
| | EE | 107,053 | 0.5% | 2 |
| | PAR | 73,004 | 0.4% | 1 |
| | Others | 1,245,951 | 6.2% | 2 |
| Total | | 20,202,919 | 100.0% | 350 |

This article presents the results breakdown of the election to the Congress of Deputies held in Spain on 22 June 1986. The following tables show detailed results in each of the country's 17 autonomous communities and in the autonomous cities of Ceuta and Melilla, as well as a summary of constituency and regional results. (Note: The autonomous cities of Ceuta and Melilla would not be constituted as independent administrative entities until 1995.)

== Nationwide ==
← Summary of the 22 June 1986 Congress of Deputies election results →
| Parties and alliances | Popular vote | | | Seats | |
| Parties and alliances | Votes | % | ±pp | Total | +/− |
|---|---|---|---|---|---|
| Spanish Socialist Workers' Party (PSOE) | 8,901,718 | 44.06 | −4.05 | 184 | −18 |
| People's Coalition (AP–PDP–PL)^{1} | 5,247,677 | 25.97 | −0.39 | 105 | −2 |
| Democratic and Social Centre (CDS) | 1,861,912 | 9.22 | +6.35 | 19 | +17 |
| Reformists (PRD–CiU–CG) | 1,288,768 | 6.38 | +2.71 | 19 | +7 |
| Convergence and Union (CiU) | 1,014,258 | 5.02 | +1.35 | 18 | +6 |
| Democratic Reformist Party (PRD) | 194,538 | 0.96 | New | 0 | ±0 |
| Galician Coalition (CG) | 79,972 | 0.40 | New | 1 | +1 |
| United Left (IU)^{2} | 935,504 | 4.63 | +0.46 | 7 | +3 |
| Basque Nationalist Party (EAJ/PNV) | 309,610 | 1.53 | −0.35 | 6 | −2 |
| Popular Unity (HB) | 231,722 | 1.15 | +0.15 | 5 | +3 |
| Communists' Unity Board (MUC) | 229,695 | 1.14 | New | 0 | ±0 |
| Basque Country Left (EE) | 107,053 | 0.53 | +0.05 | 2 | +1 |
| Andalusian Party (PA) | 94,008 | 0.47 | +0.07 | 0 | ±0 |
| Republican Left of Catalonia (ERC) | 84,628 | 0.42 | −0.24 | 0 | −1 |
| Workers' Socialist Party (PST) | 77,914 | 0.39 | −0.10 | 0 | ±0 |
| Regionalist Aragonese Party (PAR) | 73,004 | 0.36 | New | 1 | +1 |
| Canarian Independent Groups (AIC) | 65,664 | 0.33 | New | 1 | +1 |
| Valencian Union (UV) | 64,403 | 0.32 | New | 1 | +1 |
| Party of the Communists of Catalonia (PCC) | 57,107 | 0.28 | +0.06 | 0 | ±0 |
| Galician Socialist Party–Galician Left (PSG–EG)^{3} | 45,574 | 0.23 | +0.12 | 0 | ±0 |
| Spanish Phalanx of the CNSO (FE–JONS) | 43,449 | 0.22 | +0.21 | 0 | ±0 |
| Communist Unification of Spain (UCE) | 42,451 | 0.21 | +0.10 | 0 | ±0 |
| Valencian People's Union (UPV) | 40,264 | 0.20 | +0.11 | 0 | ±0 |
| Canarian Assembly–Canarian Nationalist Left (AC–INC) | 36,892 | 0.18 | +0.09 | 0 | ±0 |
| The Greens (LV) | 31,909 | 0.16 | New | 0 | ±0 |
| Green Alternative List (LAV) | 29,567 | 0.15 | New | 0 | ±0 |
| Spanish Vertex Ecological Development Revindication (VERDE) | 28,318 | 0.14 | New | 0 | ±0 |
| Republican Popular Unity (UPR)^{4} | 27,473 | 0.14 | +0.03 | 0 | ±0 |
| Galician Nationalist Bloc (BNG) | 27,049 | 0.13 | −0.05 | 0 | ±0 |
| Internationalist Socialist Workers' Party (POSI) | 21,853 | 0.11 | New | 0 | ±0 |
| United Extremadura (EU) | 16,091 | 0.08 | −0.04 | 0 | ±0 |
| Socialist Party of the Andalusian People (PSPA) | 14,999 | 0.07 | New | 0 | ±0 |
| Socialist Party of Mallorca–Nationalist Left (PSM–EN) | 7,539 | 0.04 | ±0.00 | 0 | ±0 |
| National Unity Coalition (CUN) | 5,209 | 0.03 | New | 0 | ±0 |
| Revolutionary Workers' Party of Spain (PORE) | 5,126 | 0.03 | New | 0 | ±0 |
| Social Democratic Party of Catalonia (PSDC) | 4,885 | 0.02 | New | 0 | ±0 |
| Group of Independent Electors (ADEI) | 3,857 | 0.02 | New | 0 | ±0 |
| Leonese Convergence (CL) | 2,520 | 0.01 | New | 0 | ±0 |
| Regionalist Party of the Leonese Country (PREPAL) | 2,449 | 0.01 | −0.01 | 0 | ±0 |
| Valencian Nationalist Left (ENV–URV) | 2,116 | 0.01 | −0.02 | 0 | ±0 |
| Communist Workers' League (LOC) | 1,952 | 0.01 | −0.02 | 0 | ±0 |
| Moderate Party–Centrists of Navarre (PMCN) | 1,932 | 0.01 | New | 0 | ±0 |
| Natural Culture (CN) | 1,886 | 0.01 | New | 0 | ±0 |
| Murcian Regionalist Party (PRM) | 1,401 | 0.01 | New | 0 | ±0 |
| Democratic Spanish Party (PED) | 1,169 | 0.01 | New | 0 | ±0 |
| Nationalist Party of Castile and León (PANCAL) | 1,047 | 0.01 | New | 0 | ±0 |
| Candidacy for Autonomy (CA) | 758 | 0.00 | New | 0 | ±0 |
| Proverist Party (PPr) | 756 | 0.00 | ±0.00 | 0 | ±0 |
| Electoral Group–Independent Group of Ceuta (AE–AIC) | 601 | 0.00 | New | 0 | ±0 |
| Christian Spanish Party (PAEC) | 254 | 0.00 | New | 0 | ±0 |
| Communist Movement of the Basque Country (EMK) | 0 | 0.00 | New | 0 | ±0 |
| Revolutionary Communist League (LKI) | 0 | 0.00 | −0.01 | 0 | ±0 |
| Union of the Democratic Centre (UCD) | n/a | n/a | −6.77 | 0 | −11 |
| Blank ballots | 121,186 | 0.60 | +0.13 | | |
| Total | 20,202,919 | | | 350 | ±0 |
| Valid votes | 20,202,919 | 98.43 | +0.38 | | |
| Invalid votes | 321,939 | 1.57 | −0.38 | | |
| Votes cast / turnout | 20,524,858 | 70.49 | −9.48 | | |
| Abstentions | 8,592,755 | 29.51 | +9.48 | | |
| Registered voters | 29,117,613 | | | | |
Sources
Footnotes: ^{1} People's Coalition results are compared to People's Alliance–People's Democratic Party totals in the 1982 election.; ^{2} United Left results are compared to the combined totals of the Communist Party of Spain and Left Nationalists in the 1982 election.; ^{3} Galician Socialist Party–Galician Left results are compared to Galician Left totals in the 1982 election.; ^{4} Republican Popular Unity results are compared to Communist Party of Spain (Marxist–Leninist) totals in the 1982 election.

== Summary ==
=== Constituencies ===

Summary of constituency results in the 22 June 1986 Congress of Deputies election
| Constituency | PSOE | | CP | | CDS | | REF | | IU | | PNV | | HB | | EE | | PAR | | AIC | | UV | |
| Constituency | % | S | % | S | % | S | % | S | % | S | % | S | % | S | % | S | % | S | % | S | % | S |
|---|---|---|---|---|---|---|---|---|---|---|---|---|---|---|---|---|---|---|---|---|---|---|
| Álava | 33.1 | 2 | 15.8 | 1 | 8.8 | − | | | 0.9 | − | 19.1 | 1 | 12.0 | − | 8.1 | − | | | | | | |
| Albacete | 51.1 | 3 | 31.9 | 1 | 8.7 | − | 1.0 | − | 4.6 | − | | | | | | | | | | | | |
| Alicante | 49.3 | 6 | 29.5 | 3 | 9.6 | 1 | 1.8 | − | 4.9 | − | | | | | | | | | | | 0.3 | − |
| Almería | 53.1 | 4 | 25.9 | 1 | 9.0 | − | 2.6 | − | 5.2 | − | | | | | | | | | | | | |
| Asturias | 46.0 | 5 | 27.2 | 2 | 13.2 | 1 | 0.8 | − | 9.2 | 1 | | | | | | | | | | | | |
| Ávila | 24.6 | 1 | 29.5 | 1 | 41.3 | 1 | 0.5 | − | 2.0 | − | | | | | | | | | | | | |
| Badajoz | 57.3 | 4 | 26.1 | 2 | 8.5 | − | 0.6 | − | 5.1 | − | | | | | | | | | | | | |
| Balearics | 40.3 | 3 | 34.3 | 3 | 11.3 | − | 7.1 | − | 2.3 | − | | | | | | | | | | | | |
| Barcelona | 43.2 | 16 | 10.7 | 4 | 4.4 | 1 | 29.9 | 11 | 4.2 | 1 | | | | | | | | | | | | |
| Biscay | 26.6 | 3 | 10.7 | 1 | 5.0 | − | | | 1.6 | − | 29.3 | 3 | 15.9 | 2 | 8.4 | 1 | | | | | | |
| Burgos | 37.2 | 2 | 39.5 | 2 | 14.2 | − | 2.2 | − | 2.7 | − | | | | | | | | | | | | |
| Cáceres | 53.8 | 3 | 27.7 | 2 | 7.3 | − | 1.6 | − | 2.0 | − | | | | | | | | | | | | |
| Cádiz | 60.7 | 7 | 19.8 | 2 | 5.5 | − | 0.7 | − | 5.8 | − | | | | | | | | | | | | |
| Cantabria | 44.3 | 3 | 34.1 | 2 | 13.0 | − | 1.3 | − | 3.1 | − | | | | | | | | | | | | |
| Castellón | 46.2 | 3 | 33.4 | 2 | 9.0 | − | 2.5 | − | 2.4 | − | | | | | | | | | | | 0.5 | − |
| Ceuta | 45.2 | 1 | 36.3 | − | 8.0 | − | 2.1 | − | 1.5 | − | | | | | | | | | | | | |
| Ciudad Real | 51.6 | 3 | 32.0 | 2 | 9.4 | − | 0.8 | − | 3.6 | − | | | | | | | | | | | | |
| Córdoba | 53.5 | 4 | 21.7 | 2 | 6.5 | − | 1.0 | − | 12.2 | 1 | | | | | | | | | | | | |
| Cuenca | 45.3 | 2 | 39.0 | 1 | 8.7 | − | 1.5 | − | 2.5 | − | | | | | | | | | | | | |
| Gerona | 31.4 | 2 | 9.9 | − | 2.6 | − | 45.9 | 3 | 2.5 | − | | | | | | | | | | | | |
| Granada | 53.0 | 5 | 26.3 | 2 | 6.8 | − | 0.8 | − | 7.0 | − | | | | | | | | | | | | |
| Guadalajara | 38.1 | 1 | 41.9 | 2 | 10.9 | − | 1.1 | − | 4.7 | − | | | | | | | | | | | | |
| Guipúzcoa | 23.1 | 2 | 8.1 | − | 3.6 | − | | | 0.8 | − | 28.7 | 2 | 23.0 | 2 | 10.7 | 1 | | | | | | |
| Huelva | 62.2 | 4 | 21.4 | 1 | 5.7 | − | 0.8 | − | 5.3 | − | | | | | | | | | | | | |
| Huesca | 44.5 | 2 | 25.1 | 1 | 12.8 | − | 1.6 | − | 3.3 | − | | | | | | | 9.8 | − | | | | |
| Jaén | 55.1 | 4 | 26.9 | 2 | 5.3 | − | 0.7 | − | 9.2 | − | | | | | | | | | | | | |
| La Coruña | 39.2 | 4 | 36.1 | 4 | 10.1 | 1 | 3.6 | − | 1.3 | − | | | | | | | | | | | | |
| La Rioja | 43.9 | 2 | 39.2 | 2 | 10.1 | − | 1.9 | − | 2.0 | − | | | | | | | | | | | | |
| Las Palmas | 32.6 | 3 | 28.1 | 2 | 21.1 | 2 | 2.2 | − | 5.6 | − | | | | | | | | | 2.0 | − | | |
| León | 45.2 | 3 | 34.2 | 2 | 12.4 | − | 1.2 | − | 2.6 | − | | | | | | | | | | | | |
| Lérida | 30.5 | 1 | 16.1 | 1 | 3.2 | − | 40.7 | 2 | 2.5 | − | | | | | | | | | | | | |
| Lugo | 29.6 | 2 | 46.8 | 3 | 6.5 | − | 10.6 | − | 0.7 | − | | | | | | | | | | | | |
| Madrid | 40.8 | 15 | 32.0 | 11 | 13.9 | 5 | 1.4 | − | 6.0 | 2 | | | | | | | | | | | | |
| Málaga | 57.4 | 6 | 21.9 | 2 | 6.0 | − | 0.9 | − | 9.0 | 1 | | | | | | | | | | | | |
| Melilla | 35.7 | − | 45.9 | 1 | 11.2 | − | 2.4 | − | 2.8 | − | | | | | | | | | | | | |
| Murcia | 48.8 | 5 | 34.3 | 3 | 8.3 | − | 1.3 | − | 4.5 | − | | | | | | | | | | | | |
| Navarre | 35.5 | 2 | 29.6 | 2 | 9.6 | − | 2.0 | − | 1.6 | − | 1.8 | − | 13.9 | 1 | 2.8 | − | | | | | | |
| Orense | 33.8 | 2 | 38.5 | 2 | 5.5 | − | 13.8 | 1 | 1.0 | − | | | | | | | | | | | | |
| Palencia | 40.2 | 2 | 39.7 | 1 | 12.4 | − | 1.5 | − | 2.9 | − | | | | | | | | | | | | |
| Pontevedra | 35.2 | 3 | 39.9 | 4 | 8.9 | 1 | 4.3 | − | 1.2 | − | | | | | | | | | | | | |
| Salamanca | 38.7 | 2 | 35.8 | 1 | 18.3 | 1 | 1.2 | − | 1.9 | − | | | | | | | | | | | | |
| Santa Cruz de Tenerife | 39.8 | 3 | 18.0 | 1 | 12.3 | 1 | 0.6 | − | 2.9 | − | | | | | | | | | 18.4 | 1 | | |
| Segovia | 32.4 | 1 | 36.4 | 1 | 23.5 | 1 | 1.2 | − | 2.5 | − | | | | | | | | | | | | |
| Seville | 59.2 | 8 | 21.2 | 3 | 3.6 | − | 0.6 | − | 8.3 | 1 | | | | | | | | | | | | |
| Soria | 35.8 | 1 | 42.1 | 2 | 14.1 | − | 2.2 | − | 2.6 | − | | | | | | | | | | | | |
| Tarragona | 37.9 | 2 | 15.7 | 1 | 4.1 | − | 31.8 | 2 | 3.9 | − | | | | | | | | | | | | |
| Teruel | 41.1 | 2 | 32.8 | 1 | 10.6 | − | 1.1 | − | 1.6 | − | | | | | | | 9.6 | − | | | | |
| Toledo | 46.1 | 3 | 35.4 | 2 | 10.8 | − | 0.7 | − | 4.7 | − | | | | | | | | | | | | |
| Valencia | 46.8 | 9 | 27.5 | 5 | 8.3 | 1 | 0.8 | − | 5.1 | − | | | | | | | | | | | 5.1 | 1 |
| Valladolid | 41.7 | 2 | 31.9 | 2 | 17.0 | 1 | 1.2 | − | 3.0 | − | | | | | | | | | | | | |
| Zamora | 37.5 | 2 | 40.9 | 2 | 15.1 | − | 1.1 | − | 1.9 | − | | | | | | | | | | | | |
| Zaragoza | 43.6 | 4 | 25.2 | 2 | 10.9 | 1 | 1.0 | − | 3.8 | − | | | | | | | 11.6 | 1 | | | | |
| Total | 44.1 | 184 | 26.0 | 105 | 9.2 | 19 | 6.4 | 19 | 4.6 | 7 | 1.5 | 6 | 1.1 | 5 | 0.5 | 2 | 0.4 | 1 | 0.3 | 1 | 0.3 | 1 |

=== Regions ===

Summary of regional results in the 22 June 1986 Congress of Deputies election
| Region | PSOE | | CP | | CDS | | REF | | IU | | PNV | | HB | | EE | | PAR | | AIC | | UV | |
| Region | % | S | % | S | % | S | % | S | % | S | % | S | % | S | % | S | % | S | % | S | % | S |
|---|---|---|---|---|---|---|---|---|---|---|---|---|---|---|---|---|---|---|---|---|---|---|
| Andalusia | 57.1 | 42 | 22.7 | 15 | 5.6 | − | 0.9 | − | 8.1 | 3 | | | | | | | | | | | | |
| Aragon | 43.4 | 8 | 26.1 | 4 | 11.2 | 1 | 1.1 | − | 3.4 | − | | | | | | | 11.0 | 1 | | | | |
| Asturias | 46.0 | 5 | 27.2 | 2 | 13.2 | 1 | 0.8 | − | 9.2 | 1 | | | | | | | | | | | | |
| Balearics | 40.3 | 3 | 34.3 | 3 | 11.3 | − | 7.1 | − | 2.3 | − | | | | | | | | | | | | |
| Basque Country | 26.3 | 7 | 10.5 | 2 | 5.0 | − | | | 1.3 | − | 27.8 | 6 | 17.7 | 4 | 9.1 | 2 | | | | | | |
| Canary Islands | 36.1 | 6 | 23.3 | 3 | 16.9 | 3 | 1.5 | − | 4.3 | − | | | | | | | | | 9.8 | 1 | | |
| Cantabria | 44.3 | 3 | 34.1 | 2 | 13.0 | − | 1.3 | − | 3.1 | − | | | | | | | | | | | | |
| Castile and León | 38.8 | 16 | 35.8 | 14 | 17.5 | 4 | 1.3 | − | 2.5 | − | | | | | | | | | | | | |
| Castilla–La Mancha | 47.8 | 12 | 34.8 | 8 | 9.7 | − | 0.9 | − | 4.0 | − | | | | | | | | | | | | |
| Catalonia | 41.0 | 21 | 11.4 | 6 | 4.1 | 1 | 32.0 | 18 | 3.9 | 1 | | | | | | | | | | | | |
| Ceuta | 45.2 | 1 | 36.3 | − | 8.0 | − | 2.1 | − | 1.5 | − | | | | | | | | | | | | |
| Extremadura | 55.9 | 7 | 26.7 | 4 | 8.0 | − | 1.0 | − | 3.9 | − | | | | | | | | | | | | |
| Galicia | 35.8 | 11 | 39.2 | 13 | 8.6 | 2 | 6.2 | 1 | 1.1 | − | | | | | | | | | | | | |
| La Rioja | 43.9 | 2 | 39.2 | 2 | 10.1 | − | 1.9 | − | 2.0 | − | | | | | | | | | | | | |
| Madrid | 40.8 | 15 | 32.0 | 11 | 13.9 | 5 | 1.4 | − | 6.0 | 2 | | | | | | | | | | | | |
| Melilla | 35.7 | − | 45.9 | 1 | 11.2 | − | 2.4 | − | 2.8 | − | | | | | | | | | | | | |
| Murcia | 48.8 | 5 | 34.3 | 3 | 8.3 | − | 1.3 | − | 4.5 | − | | | | | | | | | | | | |
| Navarre | 35.5 | 2 | 29.6 | 2 | 9.6 | − | 2.0 | − | 1.6 | − | 1.8 | − | 13.9 | 1 | 2.8 | − | | | | | | |
| Valencian Community | 47.5 | 18 | 28.8 | 10 | 8.8 | 2 | 1.3 | − | 4.7 | − | | | | | | | | | | | 3.1 | 1 |
| Total | 44.1 | 184 | 26.0 | 105 | 9.2 | 19 | 6.4 | 19 | 4.6 | 7 | 1.5 | 6 | 1.1 | 5 | 0.5 | 2 | 0.4 | 1 | 0.3 | 1 | 0.3 | 1 |

== Autonomous communities ==
=== Andalusia ===
← Summary of the 22 June 1986 Congress of Deputies election results in Andalusia →
| Parties and alliances | Popular vote | | | Seats | |
| Parties and alliances | Votes | % | ±pp | Total | +/− |
|---|---|---|---|---|---|
| Spanish Socialist Workers' Party (PSOE) | 1,923,891 | 57.07 | −3.38 | 42 | −1 |
| People's Coalition (AP–PDP–PL)^{1} | 764,732 | 22.68 | +0.51 | 15 | ±0 |
| United Left (IU)^{2} | 273,008 | 8.10 | +1.91 | 3 | +2 |
| Democratic and Social Centre (CDS) | 190,148 | 5.64 | +4.34 | 0 | ±0 |
| Andalusian Party (PA) | 94,008 | 2.79 | +0.53 | 0 | ±0 |
| Communists' Unity Board (MUC) | 37,668 | 1.12 | New | 0 | ±0 |
| Democratic Reformist Party (PRD) | 29,110 | 0.86 | New | 0 | ±0 |
| Socialist Party of the Andalusian People (PSPA) | 14,999 | 0.44 | New | 0 | ±0 |
| Workers' Socialist Party (PST) | 6,450 | 0.19 | −0.17 | 0 | ±0 |
| Spanish Phalanx of the CNSO (FE–JONS) | 5,712 | 0.17 | +0.17 | 0 | ±0 |
| Communist Unification of Spain (UCE) | 5,193 | 0.15 | +0.08 | 0 | ±0 |
| Republican Popular Unity (UPR)^{3} | 4,114 | 0.12 | +0.06 | 0 | ±0 |
| Internationalist Socialist Workers' Party (POSI) | 2,319 | 0.07 | New | 0 | ±0 |
| Green Alternative List (LAV) | 2,224 | 0.07 | New | 0 | ±0 |
| Spanish Vertex Ecological Development Revindication (VERDE) | 1,208 | 0.04 | New | 0 | ±0 |
| National Unity Coalition (CUN) | 814 | 0.02 | New | 0 | ±0 |
| Party of the Communists of Catalonia (PCC) | 756 | 0.02 | New | 0 | ±0 |
| Blank ballots | 14,847 | 0.44 | +0.03 | | |
| Total | 3,371,201 | | | 60 | +1 |
| Valid votes | 3,371,201 | 98.65 | +0.09 | | |
| Invalid votes | 46,066 | 1.35 | −0.09 | | |
| Votes cast / turnout | 3,417,267 | 70.77 | −7.98 | | |
| Abstentions | 1,411,605 | 29.23 | +7.98 | | |
| Registered voters | 4,828,872 | | | | |
Sources
Footnotes: ^{1} People's Coalition results are compared to People's Alliance–People's Democratic Party totals in the 1982 election.; ^{2} United Left results are compared to Communist Party of Andalusia totals in the 1982 election.; ^{3} Republican Popular Unity results are compared to Communist Party of Spain (Marxist–Leninist) totals in the 1982 election.

=== Aragon ===
← Summary of the 22 June 1986 Congress of Deputies election results in Aragon →
| Parties and alliances | Popular vote | | | Seats | |
| Parties and alliances | Votes | % | ±pp | Total | +/− |
|---|---|---|---|---|---|
| Spanish Socialist Workers' Party (PSOE) | 287,809 | 43.43 | −5.98 | 8 | −1 |
| People's Coalition (AP–PDP–PL)^{1} | 173,261 | 26.15 | −4.62 | 4 | −1 |
| Democratic and Social Centre (CDS) | 74,104 | 11.18 | +6.93 | 1 | +1 |
| Regionalist Aragonese Party (PAR) | 73,004 | 11.02 | New | 1 | +1 |
| United Left (IU)^{2} | 22,488 | 3.39 | +0.50 | 0 | ±0 |
| Communists' Unity Board (MUC) | 8,629 | 1.30 | New | 0 | ±0 |
| Democratic Reformist Party (PRD) | 7,370 | 1.11 | New | 0 | ±0 |
| Workers' Socialist Party (PST) | 2,972 | 0.45 | −0.10 | 0 | ±0 |
| Spanish Vertex Ecological Development Revindication (VERDE) | 2,570 | 0.39 | New | 0 | ±0 |
| Communist Unification of Spain (UCE) | 1,579 | 0.24 | +0.11 | 0 | ±0 |
| Spanish Phalanx of the CNSO (FE–JONS) | 1,335 | 0.20 | +0.20 | 0 | ±0 |
| Republican Popular Unity (UPR)^{3} | 1,088 | 0.16 | +0.04 | 0 | ±0 |
| Internationalist Socialist Workers' Party (POSI) | 1,016 | 0.15 | New | 0 | ±0 |
| Party of the Communists of Catalonia (PCC) | 105 | 0.02 | New | 0 | ±0 |
| Blank ballots | 5,361 | 0.81 | +0.16 | | |
| Total | 662,691 | | | 14 | ±0 |
| Valid votes | 662,691 | 97.92 | +0.91 | | |
| Invalid votes | 14,063 | 2.08 | −0.91 | | |
| Votes cast / turnout | 676,754 | 70.59 | −11.83 | | |
| Abstentions | 282,020 | 29.41 | +11.83 | | |
| Registered voters | 958,774 | | | | |
Sources
Footnotes: ^{1} People's Coalition results are compared to People's Alliance–People's Democratic–Aragonese Party totals in the 1982 election.; ^{2} United Left results are compared to Communist Party of Aragon totals in the 1982 election.; ^{3} Republican Popular Unity results are compared to Communist Party of Spain (Marxist–Leninist) totals in the 1982 election.

=== Asturias ===
← Summary of the 22 June 1986 Congress of Deputies election results in Asturias →
| Parties and alliances | Popular vote | | | Seats | |
| Parties and alliances | Votes | % | ±pp | Total | +/− |
|---|---|---|---|---|---|
| Spanish Socialist Workers' Party (PSOE) | 278,946 | 45.99 | −6.14 | 5 | −1 |
| People's Coalition (AP–PDP–PL)^{1} | 165,071 | 27.22 | −0.72 | 2 | −1 |
| Democratic and Social Centre (CDS) | 79,788 | 13.16 | +8.85 | 1 | +1 |
| United Left (IU)^{2} | 55,881 | 9.21 | +1.07 | 1 | ±0 |
| Communists' Unity Board (MUC) | 9,607 | 1.58 | New | 0 | ±0 |
| Democratic Reformist Party (PRD) | 5,105 | 0.84 | New | 0 | ±0 |
| Workers' Socialist Party (PST) | 3,688 | 0.61 | +0.06 | 0 | ±0 |
| Communist Unification of Spain (UCE) | 1,821 | 0.30 | +0.19 | 0 | ±0 |
| Spanish Phalanx of the CNSO (FE–JONS) | 1,497 | 0.25 | +0.25 | 0 | ±0 |
| Internationalist Socialist Workers' Party (POSI) | 889 | 0.15 | New | 0 | ±0 |
| Republican Popular Unity (UPR)^{3} | 744 | 0.12 | +0.03 | 0 | ±0 |
| Party of the Communists of Catalonia (PCC) | 0 | 0.00 | New | 0 | ±0 |
| Blank ballots | 3,477 | 0.57 | +0.14 | | |
| Total | 606,514 | | | 9 | −1 |
| Valid votes | 606,514 | 98.23 | −0.06 | | |
| Invalid votes | 10,930 | 1.77 | +0.06 | | |
| Votes cast / turnout | 617,444 | 67.82 | −9.78 | | |
| Abstentions | 293,003 | 32.18 | +9.78 | | |
| Registered voters | 910,447 | | | | |
Sources
Footnotes: ^{1} People's Coalition results are compared to People's Alliance–People's Democratic Party totals in the 1982 election.; ^{2} United Left results are compared to Communist Party of Spain totals in the 1982 election.; ^{3} Republican Popular Unity results are compared to Communist Party of Spain (Marxist–Leninist) totals in the 1982 election.

=== Balearics ===
← Summary of the 22 June 1986 Congress of Deputies election results in the Balearics →
| Parties and alliances | Popular vote | | | Seats | |
| Parties and alliances | Votes | % | ±pp | Total | +/− |
|---|---|---|---|---|---|
| Spanish Socialist Workers' Party (PSOE) | 137,363 | 40.28 | −0.17 | 3 | ±0 |
| People's Coalition (AP–PDP–PL)^{1} | 117,007 | 34.31 | −3.40 | 3 | ±0 |
| Democratic and Social Centre (CDS) | 38,510 | 11.29 | +6.04 | 0 | ±0 |
| Democratic Reformist Party (PRD) | 24,379 | 7.15 | New | 0 | ±0 |
| United Left (IU)^{2} | 7,942 | 2.33 | +0.66 | 0 | ±0 |
| Nationalist Left (PSM–EN) | 7,539 | 2.21 | −0.21 | 0 | ±0 |
| Communists' Unity Board (MUC) | 1,713 | 0.50 | New | 0 | ±0 |
| Communist Unification of Spain (UCE) | 1,105 | 0.32 | +0.17 | 0 | ±0 |
| Spanish Phalanx of the CNSO (FE–JONS) | 1,062 | 0.31 | +0.31 | 0 | ±0 |
| Republican Popular Unity (UPR)^{3} | 800 | 0.23 | +0.10 | 0 | ±0 |
| Revolutionary Workers' Party of Spain (PORE) | 601 | 0.18 | New | 0 | ±0 |
| Internationalist Socialist Workers' Party (POSI) | 583 | 0.17 | New | 0 | ±0 |
| Party of the Communists of Catalonia (PCC) | 0 | 0.00 | New | 0 | ±0 |
| Blank ballots | 2,452 | 0.72 | +0.12 | | |
| Total | 341,056 | | | 6 | ±0 |
| Valid votes | 341,056 | 97.82 | +2.06 | | |
| Invalid votes | 7,592 | 2.18 | −2.06 | | |
| Votes cast / turnout | 348,648 | 66.02 | −13.72 | | |
| Abstentions | 179,474 | 33.98 | +13.72 | | |
| Registered voters | 528,122 | | | | |
Sources
Footnotes: ^{1} People's Coalition results are compared to People's Alliance–People's Democratic Party totals in the 1982 election.; ^{2} United Left results are compared to Communist Party of Spain totals in the 1982 election.; ^{3} Republican Popular Unity results are compared to Communist Party of Spain (Marxist–Leninist) totals in the 1982 election.

=== Basque Country ===
← Summary of the 22 June 1986 Congress of Deputies election results in the Basque Country →
| Parties and alliances | Popular vote | | | Seats | |
| Parties and alliances | Votes | % | ±pp | Total | +/− |
|---|---|---|---|---|---|
| Basque Nationalist Party (EAJ/PNV) | 304,675 | 27.82 | −3.91 | 6 | −2 |
| Socialist Party of the Basque Country (PSE–PSOE) | 287,918 | 26.29 | −2.87 | 7 | −1 |
| Popular Unity (HB) | 193,724 | 17.69 | +2.98 | 4 | +2 |
| People's Coalition (AP–PDP–PL)^{1} | 114,967 | 10.50 | −1.14 | 2 | ±0 |
| Basque Country Left (EE) | 99,408 | 9.08 | +1.39 | 2 | +1 |
| Democratic and Social Centre (CDS) | 54,724 | 5.00 | +3.17 | 0 | ±0 |
| United Left (IU) | 13,690 | 1.25 | New | 0 | ±0 |
| Communist Party of the Basque Country (PCE/EPK) | 10,255 | 0.94 | −0.81 | 0 | ±0 |
| Workers' Socialist Party (PST) | 4,297 | 0.39 | −0.10 | 0 | ±0 |
| Communist Unification of Spain (UCE) | 2,179 | 0.20 | +0.06 | 0 | ±0 |
| Internationalist Socialist Workers' Party (POSI) | 1,460 | 0.13 | New | 0 | ±0 |
| Republican Popular Unity (UPR)^{2} | 1,379 | 0.13 | +0.05 | 0 | ±0 |
| Spanish Phalanx of the CNSO (FE–JONS) | 751 | 0.07 | New | 0 | ±0 |
| Communist Movement of the Basque Country (EMK) | 0 | 0.00 | −0.01 | 0 | ±0 |
| Revolutionary Communist League (LKI) | 0 | 0.00 | ±0.00 | 0 | ±0 |
| Party of the Communists of Catalonia (PCC) | 0 | 0.00 | New | 0 | ±0 |
| Blank ballots | 5,602 | 0.51 | +0.02 | | |
| Total | 1,095,029 | | | 21 | ±0 |
| Valid votes | 1,095,029 | 98.35 | +0.39 | | |
| Invalid votes | 18,407 | 1.65 | −0.39 | | |
| Votes cast / turnout | 1,113,436 | 67.58 | −11.76 | | |
| Abstentions | 534,059 | 32.42 | +11.76 | | |
| Registered voters | 1,647,495 | | | | |
Sources
Footnotes: ^{1} People's Coalition results are compared to AP–PDP–PDL–UCD totals in the 1982 election.; ^{2} Republican Popular Unity results are compared to Communist Party of Spain (Marxist–Leninist) totals in the 1982 election.

=== Canary Islands ===
← Summary of the 22 June 1986 Congress of Deputies election results in the Canary Islands →
| Parties and alliances | Popular vote | | | Seats | |
| Parties and alliances | Votes | % | ±pp | Total | +/− |
|---|---|---|---|---|---|
| Spanish Socialist Workers' Party (PSOE) | 241,197 | 36.06 | −0.59 | 6 | −1 |
| People's Coalition (AP–PDP–PL)^{1} | 155,819 | 23.30 | −3.60 | 3 | −1 |
| Democratic and Social Centre (CDS) | 113,052 | 16.90 | +11.96 | 3 | +3 |
| Canarian Independent Groups (AIC) | 65,664 | 9.82 | New | 1 | +1 |
| Canarian Assembly–Canarian Nationalist Left (AC–INC) | 36,892 | 5.52 | +2.65 | 0 | ±0 |
| United Canarian Left (ICU) | 28,820 | 4.31 | New | 0 | ±0 |
| Democratic Reformist Party (PRD) | 9,848 | 1.47 | New | 0 | ±0 |
| Workers' Socialist Party (PST) | 5,164 | 0.77 | −0.03 | 0 | ±0 |
| Communist Unification of Spain (UCE) | 2,695 | 0.40 | +0.29 | 0 | ±0 |
| Internationalist Socialist Workers' Party (POSI) | 2,204 | 0.26 | New | 0 | ±0 |
| Spanish Phalanx of the CNSO (FE–JONS) | 1,452 | 0.22 | New | 0 | ±0 |
| The Greens (LV) | 1,451 | 0.22 | New | 0 | ±0 |
| Spanish Vertex Ecological Development Revindication (VERDE) | 1,088 | 0.16 | New | 0 | ±0 |
| Republican Popular Unity (UPR)^{2} | 967 | 0.14 | −0.08 | 0 | ±0 |
| Union of the Democratic Centre (UCD) | n/a | n/a | −16.42 | 0 | −2 |
| Blank ballots | 2,548 | 0.38 | −0.11 | | |
| Total | 668,861 | | | 13 | ±0 |
| Valid votes | 668,861 | 97.98 | +0.87 | | |
| Invalid votes | 13,791 | 2.02 | −0.87 | | |
| Votes cast / turnout | 682,652 | 68.28 | −7.72 | | |
| Abstentions | 317,073 | 31.72 | +7.72 | | |
| Registered voters | 999,725 | | | | |
Sources
Footnotes: ^{1} People's Coalition results are compared to People's Alliance–People's Democratic Party totals in the 1982 election.; ^{2} Republican Popular Unity results are compared to Communist Party of Spain (Marxist–Leninist) totals in the 1982 election.

=== Cantabria ===
← Summary of the 22 June 1986 Congress of Deputies election results in Cantabria →
| Parties and alliances | Popular vote | | | Seats | |
| Parties and alliances | Votes | % | ±pp | Total | +/− |
|---|---|---|---|---|---|
| Spanish Socialist Workers' Party (PSOE) | 129,041 | 44.33 | −0.67 | 3 | ±0 |
| People's Coalition (AP–PDP–PL)^{1} | 99,149 | 34.06 | −4.85 | 2 | ±0 |
| Democratic and Social Centre (CDS) | 37,710 | 12.96 | +7.90 | 0 | ±0 |
| United Left (IU)^{2} | 8,997 | 3.09 | +0.02 | 0 | ±0 |
| Democratic Reformist Party (PRD) | 3,866 | 1.33 | New | 0 | ±0 |
| Communists' Unity Board (MUC) | 3,664 | 1.26 | New | 0 | ±0 |
| Workers' Socialist Party (PST) | 1,713 | 0.59 | +0.01 | 0 | ±0 |
| Spanish Phalanx of the CNSO (FE–JONS) | 1,503 | 0.52 | New | 0 | ±0 |
| Republican Popular Unity (UPR) | 988 | 0.34 | New | 0 | ±0 |
| Communist Unification of Spain (UCE) | 948 | 0.33 | +0.19 | 0 | ±0 |
| Internationalist Socialist Workers' Party (POSI) | 783 | 0.27 | New | 0 | ±0 |
| Party of the Communists of Catalonia (PCC) | 331 | 0.11 | New | 0 | ±0 |
| Blank ballots | 2,371 | 0.81 | +0.22 | | |
| Total | 291,064 | | | 5 | ±0 |
| Valid votes | 291,064 | 97.93 | +0.90 | | |
| Invalid votes | 6,164 | 2.07 | −0.90 | | |
| Votes cast / turnout | 297,228 | 73.43 | −9.24 | | |
| Abstentions | 107,529 | 26.57 | +9.24 | | |
| Registered voters | 404,757 | | | | |
Sources
Footnotes: ^{1} People's Coalition results are compared to People's Alliance–People's Democratic Party totals in the 1982 election.; ^{2} United Left results are compared to Communist Party of Spain totals in the 1982 election.

=== Castile and León ===
← Summary of the 22 June 1986 Congress of Deputies election results in Castile and León →
| Parties and alliances | Popular vote | | | Seats | |
| Parties and alliances | Votes | % | ±pp | Total | +/− |
|---|---|---|---|---|---|
| Spanish Socialist Workers' Party (PSOE) | 572,973 | 38.79 | −3.59 | 16 | −2 |
| People's Coalition (AP–PDP–PL)^{1} | 529,077 | 35.82 | +1.26 | 14 | +1 |
| Democratic and Social Centre (CDS) | 257,878 | 17.46 | +11.96 | 4 | +3 |
| United Left (IU)^{2} | 36,953 | 2.50 | +0.54 | 0 | ±0 |
| Democratic Reformist Party (PRD) | 19,815 | 1.34 | New | 0 | ±0 |
| Communists' Unity Board (MUC) | 16,167 | 1.09 | New | 0 | ±0 |
| Workers' Socialist Party (PST) | 7,706 | 0.52 | +0.05 | 0 | ±0 |
| Communist Unification of Spain (UCE) | 5,072 | 0.34 | +0.14 | 0 | ±0 |
| Spanish Phalanx of the CNSO (FE–JONS) | 4,356 | 0.29 | +0.29 | 0 | ±0 |
| Republican Popular Unity (UPR)^{3} | 2,893 | 0.20 | +0.09 | 0 | ±0 |
| Leonese Convergence (CL) | 2,520 | 0.17 | New | 0 | ±0 |
| Regionalist Party of the Leonese Country (PREPAL) | 2,449 | 0.17 | −0.04 | 0 | ±0 |
| Internationalist Socialist Workers' Party (POSI) | 1,601 | 0.11 | New | 0 | ±0 |
| Party of the Communists of Catalonia (PCC) | 1,413 | 0.10 | New | 0 | ±0 |
| Green Alternative List (LAV) | 1,138 | 0.08 | New | 0 | ±0 |
| Nationalist Party of Castile and León (PANCAL) | 1,047 | 0.07 | New | 0 | ±0 |
| National Unity Coalition (CUN) | 378 | 0.03 | New | 0 | ±0 |
| Christian Spanish Party (PAEC) | 254 | 0.02 | New | 0 | ±0 |
| Union of the Democratic Centre (UCD) | n/a | n/a | −12.27 | 0 | −3 |
| Blank ballots | 13,274 | 0.90 | +0.14 | | |
| Total | 1,476,964 | | | 34 | −1 |
| Valid votes | 1,476,964 | 98.00 | +0.79 | | |
| Invalid votes | 30,147 | 2.00 | −0.79 | | |
| Votes cast / turnout | 1,507,111 | 72.81 | −7.85 | | |
| Abstentions | 562,919 | 27.19 | +7.85 | | |
| Registered voters | 2,070,030 | | | | |
Sources
Footnotes: ^{1} People's Coalition results are compared to People's Alliance–People's Democratic Party totals in the 1982 election.; ^{2} United Left results are compared to Communist Party of Spain totals in the 1982 election.; ^{3} Republican Popular Unity results are compared to Communist Party of Spain (Marxist–Leninist) totals in the 1982 election.

=== Castilla–La Mancha ===
← Summary of the 22 June 1986 Congress of Deputies election results in Castilla–La Mancha →
| Parties and alliances | Popular vote | | | Seats | |
| Parties and alliances | Votes | % | ±pp | Total | +/− |
|---|---|---|---|---|---|
| Spanish Socialist Workers' Party (PSOE) | 457,573 | 47.79 | −1.42 | 12 | −1 |
| People's Coalition (AP–PDP–PL)^{1} | 333,322 | 34.81 | +3.56 | 8 | ±0 |
| Democratic and Social Centre (CDS) | 93,102 | 9.72 | +7.69 | 0 | ±0 |
| United Left (IU)^{2} | 39,065 | 4.08 | +0.34 | 0 | ±0 |
| Democratic Reformist Party (PRD) | 8,887 | 0.93 | New | 0 | ±0 |
| Communists' Unity Board (MUC) | 7,426 | 0.78 | New | 0 | ±0 |
| Spanish Phalanx of the CNSO (FE–JONS) | 4,585 | 0.48 | +0.34 | 0 | ±0 |
| Workers' Socialist Party (PST) | 2,995 | 0.31 | −0.10 | 0 | ±0 |
| Communist Unification of Spain (UCE) | 2,016 | 0.21 | +0.14 | 0 | ±0 |
| Republican Popular Unity (UPR)^{3} | 1,429 | 0.15 | +0.11 | 0 | ±0 |
| Internationalist Socialist Workers' Party (POSI) | 1,096 | 0.11 | New | 0 | ±0 |
| Party of the Communists of Catalonia (PCC) | 85 | 0.01 | New | 0 | ±0 |
| Blank ballots | 5,866 | 0.61 | +0.17 | | |
| Total | 957,447 | | | 20 | −1 |
| Valid votes | 957,447 | 98.56 | +0.57 | | |
| Invalid votes | 14,009 | 1.44 | −0.57 | | |
| Votes cast / turnout | 971,456 | 75.09 | −9.02 | | |
| Abstentions | 322,279 | 24.91 | +9.02 | | |
| Registered voters | 1,293,735 | | | | |
Sources
Footnotes: ^{1} People's Coalition results are compared to People's Alliance–People's Democratic Party totals in the 1982 election.; ^{2} United Left results are compared to Communist Party of Spain totals in the 1982 election.; ^{3} Republican Popular Unity results are compared to Communist Party of Spain (Marxist–Leninist) totals in the 1982 election.

=== Catalonia ===
← Summary of the 22 June 1986 Congress of Deputies election results in Catalonia →
| Parties and alliances | Popular vote | | | Seats | |
| Parties and alliances | Votes | % | ±pp | Total | +/− |
|---|---|---|---|---|---|
| Socialists' Party of Catalonia (PSC–PSOE) | 1,299,733 | 41.00 | −4.83 | 21 | −4 |
| Convergence and Union (CiU) | 1,014,258 | 32.00 | +9.52 | 18 | +6 |
| People's Coalition (AP–PDP–PL)^{1} | 361,316 | 11.40 | −3.26 | 6 | −2 |
| Democratic and Social Centre (CDS) | 130,704 | 4.12 | +2.13 | 1 | +1 |
| Union of the Catalan Left (PSUC–ENE)^{2} | 123,912 | 3.91 | −1.59 | 1 | ±0 |
| Republican Left of Catalonia (ERC) | 84,628 | 2.67 | −1.35 | 0 | −1 |
| Party of the Communists of Catalonia (PCC) | 50,689 | 1.60 | +0.23 | 0 | ±0 |
| Green Alternative List (LAV) | 22,727 | 0.72 | New | 0 | ±0 |
| Communists' Unity Board (MUC) | 18,100 | 0.57 | New | 0 | ±0 |
| Ecologist Party of Catalonia–VERDE (PEC–VERDE) | 11,746 | 0.37 | New | 0 | ±0 |
| Workers' Socialist Party (PST) | 11,519 | 0.36 | −0.22 | 0 | ±0 |
| Communist Unification of Spain (UCE) | 5,465 | 0.17 | +0.10 | 0 | ±0 |
| Social Democratic Party of Catalonia (PSDC) | 4,885 | 0.15 | New | 0 | ±0 |
| Spanish Phalanx of the CNSO (FE–JONS) | 3,587 | 0.11 | +0.11 | 0 | ±0 |
| Republican Popular Unity (UPR)^{3} | 3,503 | 0.11 | +0.03 | 0 | ±0 |
| Internationalist Socialist Workers' Party (POSI) | 3,430 | 0.11 | New | 0 | ±0 |
| Revolutionary Workers' Party of Spain (PORE) | 2,481 | 0.08 | New | 0 | ±0 |
| Communist Workers' League (LOC) | 1,952 | 0.06 | +0.06 | 0 | ±0 |
| Democratic Spanish Party (PED) | 1,169 | 0.04 | New | 0 | ±0 |
| Proverist Party (PPr) | 756 | 0.02 | New | 0 | ±0 |
| Blank ballots | 13,180 | 0.42 | +0.02 | | |
| Total | 3,169,740 | | | 47 | ±0 |
| Valid votes | 3,169,740 | 99.15 | +0.49 | | |
| Invalid votes | 27,257 | 0.85 | −0.49 | | |
| Votes cast / turnout | 3,196,997 | 68.95 | −11.88 | | |
| Abstentions | 1,439,762 | 31.05 | +11.88 | | |
| Registered voters | 4,636,759 | | | | |
Sources
Footnotes: ^{1} People's Coalition results are compared to People's Alliance–People's Democratic Party totals in the 1982 election.; ^{2} Union of the Catalan Left results are compared to the combined totals of Unified Socialist Party of Catalonia and Left Nationalists in the 1982 election.; ^{3} Republican Popular Unity results are compared to Communist Party of Spain (Marxist–Leninist) totals in the 1982 election.

=== Extremadura ===
← Summary of the 22 June 1986 Congress of Deputies election results in Extremadura →
| Parties and alliances | Popular vote | | | Seats | |
| Parties and alliances | Votes | % | ±pp | Total | +/− |
|---|---|---|---|---|---|
| Spanish Socialist Workers' Party (PSOE) | 336,661 | 55.88 | +0.47 | 7 | −2 |
| People's Coalition (AP–PDP–PL)^{1} | 161,036 | 26.73 | +2.93 | 4 | +1 |
| Democratic and Social Centre (CDS) | 48,434 | 8.04 | +6.41 | 0 | ±0 |
| United Left (IU)^{2} | 23,523 | 3.90 | +0.71 | 0 | ±0 |
| United Extremadura (EU) | 16,091 | 2.67 | −1.68 | 0 | ±0 |
| Democratic Reformist Party (PRD) | 5,759 | 0.96 | New | 0 | ±0 |
| Communists' Unity Board (MUC) | 4,291 | 0.71 | New | 0 | ±0 |
| Communist Unification of Spain (UCE) | 1,651 | 0.27 | +0.19 | 0 | ±0 |
| Internationalist Socialist Workers' Party (POSI) | 638 | 0.11 | New | 0 | ±0 |
| Spanish Phalanx of the CNSO (FE–JONS) | 572 | 0.09 | +0.08 | 0 | ±0 |
| Republican Popular Unity (UPR) | 381 | 0.06 | New | 0 | ±0 |
| Party of the Communists of Catalonia (PCC) | 288 | 0.05 | New | 0 | ±0 |
| Blank ballots | 3,128 | 0.52 | +0.14 | | |
| Total | 602,453 | | | 11 | −1 |
| Valid votes | 602,453 | 98.76 | +0.61 | | |
| Invalid votes | 7,537 | 1.24 | −0.61 | | |
| Votes cast / turnout | 609,990 | 73.58 | −6.40 | | |
| Abstentions | 219,049 | 26.42 | +6.40 | | |
| Registered voters | 829,039 | | | | |
Sources
Footnotes: ^{1} People's Coalition results are compared to People's Alliance–People's Democratic Party totals in the 1982 election.; ^{2} United Left results are compared to Communist Party of Spain totals in the 1982 election.

=== Galicia ===
← Summary of the 22 June 1986 Congress of Deputies election results in Galicia →
| Parties and alliances | Popular vote | | | Seats | |
| Parties and alliances | Votes | % | ±pp | Total | +/− |
|---|---|---|---|---|---|
| People's Coalition (AP–PDP–PL)^{1} | 502,405 | 39.19 | +1.59 | 13 | ±0 |
| Socialists' Party of Galicia (PSdG–PSOE) | 458,376 | 35.76 | +2.93 | 11 | +2 |
| Democratic and Social Centre (CDS) | 109,849 | 8.57 | +5.98 | 2 | +2 |
| Galician Coalition (CG) | 79,972 | 6.24 | New | 1 | +1 |
| Galician Socialist Party–Galician Left (PSG–EG)^{2} | 45,574 | 3.56 | +1.85 | 0 | ±0 |
| Galician Nationalist Bloc (BNG) | 27,049 | 2.11 | −0.85 | 0 | ±0 |
| Galicianist and United Left Platform (PG–EU)^{3} | 14,614 | 1.14 | −0.41 | 0 | ±0 |
| Communists' Unity Board (MUC) | 12,072 | 0.94 | New | 0 | ±0 |
| Workers' Socialist Party (PST) | 8,237 | 0.64 | −0.32 | 0 | ±0 |
| Group of Independent Electors (ADEI) | 3,857 | 0.30 | New | 0 | ±0 |
| Communist Unification of Spain (UCE) | 3,274 | 0.26 | +0.08 | 0 | ±0 |
| Spanish Phalanx of the CNSO (FE–JONS) | 2,299 | 0.18 | +0.11 | 0 | ±0 |
| Republican Popular Unity (UPR)^{4} | 2,175 | 0.17 | +0.03 | 0 | ±0 |
| Party of the Communists of Catalonia (PCC) | 1,739 | 0.14 | New | 0 | ±0 |
| Spanish Vertex Ecological Development Revindication (VERDE) | 1,420 | 0.11 | New | 0 | ±0 |
| Internationalist Socialist Workers' Party (POSI) | 975 | 0.08 | New | 0 | ±0 |
| National Unity Coalition (CUN) | 937 | 0.07 | New | 0 | ±0 |
| Union of the Democratic Centre (UCD) | n/a | n/a | −17.71 | 0 | −5 |
| Blank ballots | 7,103 | 0.55 | +0.05 | | |
| Total | 1,281,927 | | | 27 | ±0 |
| Valid votes | 1,281,927 | 98.63 | +0.30 | | |
| Invalid votes | 17,755 | 1.37 | −0.30 | | |
| Votes cast / turnout | 1,299,682 | 57.89 | −5.81 | | |
| Abstentions | 945,332 | 42.11 | +5.81 | | |
| Registered voters | 2,245,014 | | | | |
Sources
Footnotes: ^{1} People's Coalition results are compared to People's Alliance–People's Democratic Party totals in the 1982 election.; ^{2} Galician Socialist Party–Galician Left results are compared to Galician Left totals in the 1982 election.; ^{3} Galicianist and United Left Platform results are compared to Communist Party of Galicia totals in the 1982 election.; ^{4} Republican Popular Unity results are compared to Communist Party of Spain (Marxist–Leninist) totals in the 1982 election.

=== La Rioja ===
← Summary of the 22 June 1986 Congress of Deputies election results in La Rioja →
| Parties and alliances | Popular vote | | | Seats | |
| Parties and alliances | Votes | % | ±pp | Total | +/− |
|---|---|---|---|---|---|
| Spanish Socialist Workers' Party (PSOE) | 65,151 | 43.92 | +0.47 | 2 | ±0 |
| People's Coalition (AP–PDP–PL)^{1} | 58,177 | 39.22 | −2.31 | 2 | ±0 |
| Democratic and Social Centre (CDS) | 14,953 | 10.08 | +6.38 | 0 | ±0 |
| United Left (IU)^{2} | 2,961 | 2.00 | +0.40 | 0 | ±0 |
| Democratic Reformist Party (PRD) | 2,824 | 1.90 | New | 0 | ±0 |
| Communists' Unity Board (MUC) | 1,531 | 1.03 | New | 0 | ±0 |
| Communist Unification of Spain (UCE) | 524 | 0.35 | +0.06 | 0 | ±0 |
| Spanish Phalanx of the CNSO (FE–JONS) | 372 | 0.25 | New | 0 | ±0 |
| Republican Popular Unity (UPR)^{3} | 284 | 0.19 | +0.12 | 0 | ±0 |
| Party of the Communists of Catalonia (PCC) | 190 | 0.13 | New | 0 | ±0 |
| Blank ballots | 1,361 | 0.92 | +0.22 | | |
| Total | 148,328 | | | 4 | ±0 |
| Valid votes | 148,328 | 98.04 | +0.52 | | |
| Invalid votes | 2,968 | 1.96 | −0.52 | | |
| Votes cast / turnout | 151,296 | 74.31 | −9.79 | | |
| Abstentions | 52,308 | 25.69 | +9.79 | | |
| Registered voters | 203,604 | | | | |
Sources
Footnotes: ^{1} People's Coalition results are compared to People's Alliance–People's Democratic Party totals in the 1982 election.; ^{2} United Left results are compared to Communist Party of Spain totals in the 1982 election.; ^{3} Republican Popular Unity results are compared to Communist Party of Spain (Marxist–Leninist) totals in the 1982 election.

=== Madrid ===
← Summary of the 22 June 1986 Congress of Deputies election results in Madrid →
| Parties and alliances | Popular vote | | | Seats | |
| Parties and alliances | Votes | % | ±pp | Total | +/− |
|---|---|---|---|---|---|
| Spanish Socialist Workers' Party (PSOE) | 1,054,730 | 40.81 | −11.28 | 15 | −3 |
| People's Coalition (AP–PDP–PL)^{1} | 826,206 | 31.97 | −0.29 | 11 | ±0 |
| Democratic and Social Centre (CDS) | 360,246 | 13.94 | +9.84 | 5 | +4 |
| United Left (IU)^{2} | 155,932 | 6.03 | +1.05 | 2 | +1 |
| Communists' Unity Board (MUC) | 63.928 | 2.47 | New | 0 | ±0 |
| Democratic Reformist Party (PRD) | 36,709 | 1.42 | New | 0 | ±0 |
| The Greens (LV) | 18,559 | 0.72 | New | 0 | ±0 |
| Workers' Socialist Party (PST) | 11,282 | 0.44 | +0.15 | 0 | ±0 |
| Spanish Phalanx of the CNSO (FE–JONS) | 7,761 | 0.30 | +0.30 | 0 | ±0 |
| Spanish Vertex Ecological Development Revindication (VERDE) | 7,261 | 0.28 | New | 0 | ±0 |
| Green Alternative List (LAV) | 3,478 | 0.13 | New | 0 | ±0 |
| National Unity Coalition (CUN) | 3,080 | 0.12 | New | 0 | ±0 |
| Communist Unification of Spain (UCE) | 2,737 | 0.11 | −0.03 | 0 | ±0 |
| Republican Popular Unity (UPR)^{3} | 2,191 | 0.08 | +0.03 | 0 | ±0 |
| Revolutionary Workers' Party of Spain (PORE) | 2,044 | 0.08 | New | 0 | ±0 |
| Natural Culture (CN) | 1,886 | 0.07 | New | 0 | ±0 |
| Internationalist Socialist Workers' Party (POSI) | 1,422 | 0.06 | New | 0 | ±0 |
| Party of the Communists of Catalonia (PCC) | 296 | 0.01 | New | 0 | ±0 |
| Union of the Democratic Centre (UCD) | n/a | n/a | −3.35 | 0 | −1 |
| Blank ballots | 24,814 | 0.96 | +0.53 | | |
| Total | 2,584,562 | | | 33 | +1 |
| Valid votes | 2,584,562 | 98.29 | +0.16 | | |
| Invalid votes | 44,844 | 1.71 | −0.16 | | |
| Votes cast / turnout | 2,629,406 | 73.90 | −12.06 | | |
| Abstentions | 928,522 | 26.10 | +12.06 | | |
| Registered voters | 3,557,928 | | | | |
Sources
Footnotes: ^{1} People's Coalition results are compared to People's Alliance–People's Democratic Party totals in the 1982 election.; ^{2} United Left results are compared to Communist Party of Spain totals in the 1982 election.; ^{3} Republican Popular Unity results are compared to Communist Party of Spain (Marxist–Leninist) totals in the 1982 election.

=== Murcia ===
← Summary of the 22 June 1986 Congress of Deputies election results in Murcia →
| Parties and alliances | Popular vote | | | Seats | |
| Parties and alliances | Votes | % | ±pp | Total | +/− |
|---|---|---|---|---|---|
| Spanish Socialist Workers' Party (PSOE) | 261,922 | 48.85 | −1.91 | 5 | ±0 |
| People's Coalition (AP–PDP–PL)^{1} | 184,109 | 34.33 | −1.25 | 3 | ±0 |
| Democratic and Social Centre (CDS) | 44,724 | 8.34 | +6.42 | 0 | ±0 |
| United Left (IU)^{2} | 24,222 | 4.52 | +0.76 | 0 | ±0 |
| Democratic Reformist Party (PRD) | 7,067 | 1.32 | New | 0 | ±0 |
| Communists' Unity Board (MUC) | 3,005 | 0.56 | New | 0 | ±0 |
| Workers' Socialist Party (PST) | 1,959 | 0.37 | New | 0 | ±0 |
| Spanish Phalanx of the CNSO (FE–JONS) | 1,488 | 0.28 | New | 0 | ±0 |
| Murcian Regionalist Party (PRM) | 1,401 | 0.26 | New | 0 | ±0 |
| Communist Unification of Spain (UCE) | 1,352 | 0.25 | +0.12 | 0 | ±0 |
| Republican Popular Unity (UPR)^{3} | 884 | 0.16 | +0.07 | 0 | ±0 |
| Internationalist Socialist Workers' Party (POSI) | 881 | 0.16 | New | 0 | ±0 |
| Party of the Communists of Catalonia (PCC) | 580 | 0.11 | New | 0 | ±0 |
| Blank ballots | 2,624 | 0.49 | +0.14 | | |
| Total | 536,218 | | | 8 | ±0 |
| Valid votes | 536,218 | 98.51 | +0.02 | | |
| Invalid votes | 8,105 | 1.49 | −0.02 | | |
| Votes cast / turnout | 544,323 | 74.66 | −7.83 | | |
| Abstentions | 184,718 | 25.34 | +7.83 | | |
| Registered voters | 729,041 | | | | |
Sources
Footnotes: ^{1} People's Coalition results are compared to People's Alliance–People's Democratic Party totals in the 1982 election.; ^{2} United Left results are compared to Communist Party of Spain totals in the 1982 election.; ^{3} Republican Popular Unity results are compared to Communist Party of Spain (Marxist–Leninist) totals in the 1982 election.

=== Navarre ===
← Summary of the 22 June 1986 Congress of Deputies election results in Navarre →
| Parties and alliances | Popular vote | | | Seats | |
| Parties and alliances | Votes | % | ±pp | Total | +/− |
|---|---|---|---|---|---|
| Spanish Socialist Workers' Party (PSOE) | 97,010 | 35.52 | −2.12 | 2 | −1 |
| People's Coalition (AP–PL–UPN)^{1} | 80,922 | 29.63 | +4.04 | 2 | ±0 |
| Popular Unity (HB) | 37,998 | 13.91 | +2.25 | 1 | +1 |
| Democratic and Social Centre (CDS) | 26,106 | 9.56 | +5.44 | 0 | ±0 |
| Basque Country Left (EE) | 7,645 | 2.80 | −0.02 | 0 | ±0 |
| Democratic Reformist Party (PRD) | 5,481 | 2.01 | New | 0 | ±0 |
| Basque Nationalist Party (EAJ/PNV) | 4,935 | 1.81 | −3.68 | 0 | ±0 |
| United Left (IU)^{2} | 4,244 | 1.55 | +0.83 | 0 | ±0 |
| Moderate Party–Centrists of Navarre (PMCN) | 1,932 | 0.71 | New | 0 | ±0 |
| Communists' Unity Board (MUC) | 1,552 | 0.57 | New | 0 | ±0 |
| Workers' Socialist Party (PST) | 1,202 | 0.44 | +0.07 | 0 | ±0 |
| Communist Unification of Spain (UCE) | 618 | 0.23 | +0.14 | 0 | ±0 |
| Republican Popular Unity (UPR)^{3} | 446 | 0.16 | +0.06 | 0 | ±0 |
| Internationalist Socialist Workers' Party (POSI) | 349 | 0.13 | New | 0 | ±0 |
| Revolutionary Communist League (LKI) | 0 | 0.00 | ±0.00 | 0 | ±0 |
| Communist Movement of the Basque Country (EMK) | 0 | 0.00 | ±0.00 | 0 | ±0 |
| Blank ballots | 2,712 | 0.99 | +0.36 | | |
| Total | 273,152 | | | 5 | ±0 |
| Valid votes | 273,152 | 98.02 | +0.53 | | |
| Invalid votes | 5,529 | 1.98 | −0.53 | | |
| Votes cast / turnout | 278,681 | 69.80 | −11.53 | | |
| Abstentions | 120,597 | 30.20 | +11.53 | | |
| Registered voters | 399,278 | | | | |
Sources
Footnotes: ^{1} People's Coalition results are compared to Navarrese People's Union–Alliance–People's Democratic totals in the 1982 election.; ^{2} United Left results are compared to Communist Party of the Basque Country totals in the 1982 election.; ^{3} Republican Popular Unity results are compared to Communist Party of Spain (Marxist–Leninist) totals in the 1982 election.

=== Valencian Community ===
← Summary of the 22 June 1986 Congress of Deputies election results in the Valencian Community →
| Parties and alliances | Popular vote | | | Seats | |
| Parties and alliances | Votes | % | ±pp | Total | +/− |
|---|---|---|---|---|---|
| Spanish Socialist Workers' Party (PSOE) | 993,439 | 47.49 | −5.62 | 18 | −1 |
| People's Coalition (AP–PDP–PL)^{1} | 603,231 | 28.84 | −0.28 | 10 | ±0 |
| Democratic and Social Centre (CDS) | 183,734 | 8.78 | +6.32 | 2 | +2 |
| United Left (IU)^{2} | 98,352 | 4.70 | +0.05 | 0 | ±0 |
| Valencian Union (UV) | 64,403 | 3.08 | New | 1 | +1 |
| Valencian People's Union (UPV) | 40,264 | 1.92 | +1.04 | 0 | ±0 |
| Communists' Unity Board (MUC) | 30,087 | 1.44 | New | 0 | ±0 |
| Democratic Reformist Party (PRD) | 27,354 | 1.31 | New | 0 | ±0 |
| The Greens (LV) | 11,899 | 0.57 | New | 0 | ±0 |
| Workers' Socialist Party (PST) | 8,613 | 0.41 | −0.16 | 0 | ±0 |
| Spanish Phalanx of the CNSO (FE–JONS) | 5,117 | 0.24 | +0.24 | 0 | ±0 |
| Communist Unification of Spain (UCE) | 4,038 | 0.19 | +0.08 | 0 | ±0 |
| Republican Popular Unity (UPR)^{3} | 3,207 | 0.15 | +0.07 | 0 | ±0 |
| Spanish Vertex Ecological Development Revindication (VERDE) | 3,025 | 0.14 | New | 0 | ±0 |
| Internationalist Socialist Workers' Party (POSI) | 2,207 | 0.11 | New | 0 | ±0 |
| Valencian Nationalist Left (ENV–URV) | 2,116 | 0.10 | −0.22 | 0 | ±0 |
| Party of the Communists of Catalonia (PCC) | 635 | 0.03 | New | 0 | ±0 |
| Blank ballots | 10,041 | 0.48 | +0.07 | | |
| Total | 2,091,762 | | | 31 | +2 |
| Valid votes | 2,091,762 | 97.84 | +0.12 | | |
| Invalid votes | 46,222 | 2.16 | −0.12 | | |
| Votes cast / turnout | 2,137,984 | 76.40 | −7.63 | | |
| Abstentions | 660,449 | 23.60 | +7.63 | | |
| Registered voters | 2,798,433 | | | | |
Sources
Footnotes: ^{1} People's Coalition results are compared to People's Alliance–People's Democratic Party–Valencian Union totals in the 1982 election.; ^{2} United Left results are compared to Communist Party of the Valencian Country totals in the 1982 election.; ^{3} Republican Popular Unity results are compared to Communist Party of Spain (Marxist–Leninist) totals in the 1982 election.

== Autonomous cities ==
=== Ceuta ===
← Summary of the 22 June 1986 Congress of Deputies election results in Ceuta →
| Parties and alliances | Popular vote | | | Seats | |
| Parties and alliances | Votes | % | ±pp | Total | +/− |
|---|---|---|---|---|---|
| Spanish Socialist Workers' Party (PSOE) | 10,937 | 45.23 | −0.31 | 1 | ±0 |
| People's Coalition (AP–PDP–PL)^{1} | 8,788 | 36.34 | +6.47 | 0 | ±0 |
| Democratic and Social Centre (CDS) | 1,928 | 7.97 | +0.15 | 0 | ±0 |
| Candidacy for Autonomy (CA) | 758 | 3.13 | New | 0 | ±0 |
| Electoral Group–Independent Group of Ceuta (AE–AIC) | 601 | 2.49 | New | 0 | ±0 |
| Democratic Reformist Party (PRD) | 499 | 2.06 | New | 0 | ±0 |
| United Left (IU)^{2} | 351 | 1.45 | +0.72 | 0 | ±0 |
| Workers' Socialist Party (PST) | 117 | 0.48 | −0.05 | 0 | ±0 |
| Communist Unification of Spain (UCE) | 66 | 0.27 | +0.20 | 0 | ±0 |
| Blank ballots | 136 | 0.56 | +0.10 | | |
| Total | 24,181 | | | 1 | ±0 |
| Valid votes | 24,181 | 98.66 | −0.09 | | |
| Invalid votes | 329 | 1.34 | +0.09 | | |
| Votes cast / turnout | 24,510 | 56.70 | −15.59 | | |
| Abstentions | 18,720 | 43.30 | +15.59 | | |
| Registered voters | 43,230 | | | | |
Sources
Footnotes: ^{1} People's Coalition results are compared to People's Alliance–People's Democratic Party totals in the 1982 election.; ^{2} United Left results are compared to Communist Party of Spain totals in the 1982 election.

=== Melilla ===
← Summary of the 22 June 1986 Congress of Deputies election results in Melilla →
| Parties and alliances | Popular vote | | | Seats | |
| Parties and alliances | Votes | % | ±pp | Total | +/− |
|---|---|---|---|---|---|
| People's Coalition (AP–PDP–PL)^{1} | 9,082 | 45.94 | +19.51 | 1 | +1 |
| Spanish Socialist Workers' Party (PSOE) | 7,048 | 35.65 | −13.34 | 0 | −1 |
| Democratic and Social Centre (CDS) | 2,218 | 11.22 | +3.53 | 0 | ±0 |
| United Left (IU) | 549 | 2.78 | New | 0 | ±0 |
| Democratic Reformist Party (PRD) | 465 | 2.35 | New | 0 | ±0 |
| Communist Unification of Spain (UCE) | 118 | 0.60 | +0.29 | 0 | ±0 |
| Blank ballots | 289 | 1.46 | +0.74 | | |
| Total | 19,769 | | | 1 | ±0 |
| Valid votes | 19,769 | 98.88 | −0.09 | | |
| Invalid votes | 224 | 1.12 | +0.09 | | |
| Votes cast / turnout | 19,993 | 59.98 | −10.52 | | |
| Abstentions | 13,337 | 40.02 | +10.52 | | |
| Registered voters | 33,330 | | | | |
Sources
Footnotes: ^{1} People's Coalition results are compared to People's Alliance–People's Democratic Party totals in the 1982 election.
