= Results of the 1989 Spanish Congress election =

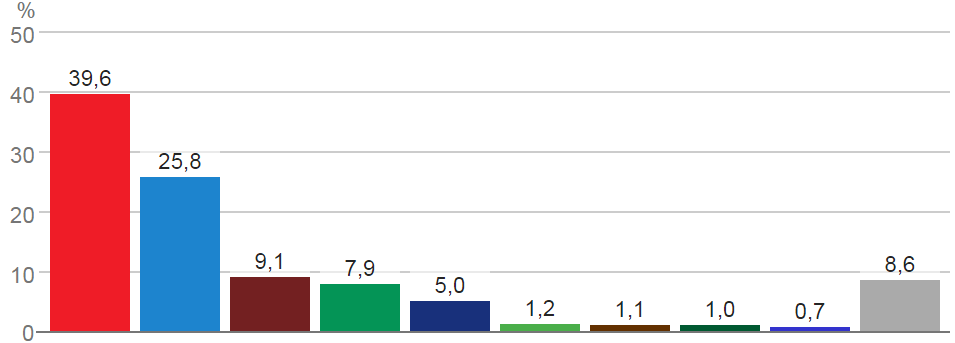
(Spain)	Main: 1989 Spanish general election
← 1986 29 October 1989 1993 →
Party		Votes	%	Seats
	PSOE	8,115,568	39.6%	175
	PP	5,285,972	25.8%	107
	IU	1,858,588	9.1%	17
	CDS	1,617,716	7.9%	14
	CiU	1,032,243	5.0%	18
	EAJ/PNV	254,681	1.2%	5
	HB	217,278	1.1%	4
	PA	212,687	1.0%	2
	UV	144,924	0.7%	2
	Others	1,754,025	8.6%	6
Total		20,493,682	100.0%	350

This article presents the results breakdown of the election to the Congress of Deputies held in Spain on 29 October 1989. The following tables show detailed results in each of the country's 17 autonomous communities and in the autonomous cities of Ceuta and Melilla, as well as a summary of constituency and regional results. (Note: The autonomous cities of Ceuta and Melilla would not be constituted as independent administrative entities until 1995.)

== Nationwide ==
← Summary of the 29 October 1989 Congress of Deputies election results →
Parties and alliances	Popular vote			Seats	
Parties and alliances	Votes	%	±pp	Total	+/−
Spanish Socialist Workers' Party (PSOE)^{1}	8,115,568	39.60	−4.46	175	−9
People's Party (PP)^{1} ^{2}	5,285,972	25.79	−0.18	107	+2
United Left (IU)	1,858,588	9.07	+4.44	17	+10
Democratic and Social Centre (CDS)	1,617,716	7.89	−1.33	14	−5
Convergence and Union (CiU)	1,032,243	5.04	+0.02	18	±0
Basque Nationalist Party (EAJ/PNV)	254,681	1.24	−0.29	5	−1
Ruiz-Mateos Group (Ruiz-Mateos)	219,883	1.07	New	0	±0
Popular Unity (HB)	217,278	1.06	−0.09	4	−1
Andalusian Party (PA)	212,687	1.04	+0.57	2	+2
Green List (LV)	158,034	0.77	+0.61	0	±0
The Greens–Green List (LV–LV)	157,103	0.77	+0.61	0	±0
Ecologist Party of the Basque Country (PEE–(LV))	931	0.00	New	0	±0
Valencian Union (UV)	144,924	0.71	New	2	+1
Basque Solidarity (EA)	136,955	0.67	New	2	+2
The Ecologist Greens (LVE)	136,335	0.67	New	0	±0
Basque Country Left (EE)	105,238	0.51	−0.02	2	±0
Workers' Party of Spain–Communist Unity (PTE–UC)^{3}	86,257	0.42	−0.72	0	±0
Republican Left of Catalonia (ERC)	84,756	0.41	−0.01	0	±0
Workers' Socialist Party (PST)	81,218	0.40	+0.01	0	±0
Regionalist Aragonese Party (PAR)	71,733	0.35	−0.01	1	±0
Canarian Independent Groups (AIC)	64,767	0.32	−0.01	1	±0
Communist Party of the Peoples of Spain (PCPE)	62,664	0.31	New	0	±0
Galician Nationalist Bloc (BNG)	47,763	0.23	+0.10	0	±0
Galician Coalition (CG)	45,821	0.22	−0.18	0	−1
Valencian People's Union (UPV)	40,767	0.20	±0.00	0	±0
Galician Socialist Party–Galician Left (PSG–EG)	34,131	0.17	−0.06	0	±0
Green Alternative–Ecologist Movement of Catalonia (AV–MEC)^{4}	25,978	0.13	−0.02	0	±0
Spanish Phalanx of the CNSO (FE–JONS)	24,025	0.12	−0.10	0	±0
Canarian Nationalist Assembly (ACN)^{5}	21,539	0.11	−0.07	0	±0
Spanish Vertex Ecological Development Revindication (VERDE)	21,235	0.10	−0.04	0	±0
Social Democratic Coalition (CSD)^{6}	17,095	0.08	+0.06	0	±0
Humanist Party (PH)	15,936	0.08	New	0	±0
Galician Nationalist Party–Galicianist Party (PNG–PG)	14,411	0.07	New	0	±0
Alliance for the Republic (AxR)^{7}	12,807	0.06	−0.05	0	±0
United Extremadura (EU)	10,984	0.05	−0.03	0	±0
Nationalist Left (PSM–ENE)	7,989	0.04	±0.00	0	±0
Revolutionary Workers' Party of Spain (PORE)	7,906	0.04	+0.01	0	±0
Independents of Gran Canaria (IGC)	6,371	0.03	New	0	±0
Asturianist Party (PAS)	5,414	0.03	New	0	±0
Centrist Unity–Democratic Spanish Party (PED)	4,942	0.02	+0.01	0	±0
Galician People's Front (FPG)	3,657	0.02	New	0	±0
Regional Party of Madrid (PAM)	3,396	0.02	New	0	±0
Group of Madrid Radicals (GRM)	3,330	0.02	New	0	±0
Asturian Nationalist Unity (UNA)	3,218	0.02	New	0	±0
Aragonese Union (UA–CHA)	3,156	0.02	New	0	±0
Valencian Nationalist Left–Valencian Regional Union (ENV–URV)	2,988	0.01	±0.00	0	±0
Regionalist Party of the Leonese Country (PREPAL)	2,962	0.01	±0.00	0	±0
Balearic Union (UB)	2,883	0.01	New	0	±0
United Ceuta (CEU)	2,760	0.01	New	0	±0
7 Green Stars (SEV)	1,411	0.01	New	0	±0
Green Movement (MV)	1,368	0.01	New	0	±0
Independent Citizen Group (ACI)	1,359	0.01	New	0	±0
Nationalist Party of Castile and León (PANCAL)	1,199	0.01	±0.00	0	±0
Cantonalist Party of the Alicantine Country (Alicantón)	1,041	0.01	New	0	±0
Spanish Democratic Republican Action (ARDE)	975	0.00	New	0	±0
Radicals for Cantabria (RxC)	904	0.00	New	0	±0
Independent Spanish Phalanx (FEI)	827	0.00	New	0	±0
Lanzarote Assembly (Tagoror)	472	0.00	New	0	±0
Regionalist Party of Guadalajara (PRGU)	426	0.00	New	0	±0
Balearic Radical Party (PRB)	398	0.00	New	0	±0
Spanish Nationalist Party of Melilla (PNEM)	301	0.00	New	0	±0
Proverist Party (PPr)	245	0.00	±0.00	0	±0
Revolutionary Communist League–Communist Movement (LCR–MC)^{8}	0	0.00	±0.00	0	±0
Communist Party of Spain (Marxist–Leninist) (PCE (m–l))^{9}	0	0.00	−0.14	0	±0
Blank ballots	141,795	0.69	+0.09		
Total	20,493,682			350	±0
Valid votes	20,493,682	99.26	+0.83		
Invalid votes	152,683	0.74	−0.83		
Votes cast / turnout	20,646,365	69.74	−0.75		
Abstentions	8,957,690	30.26	+0.75		
Registered voters	29,604,055				
Sources
Footnotes: ^{1} Initial projected results were PSOE 176 seats and PP 106. After results in Melilla were declared void and a by-election held on 25 March 1990, the PP took 1 additional seat from PSOE.; ^{2} People's Party results are compared to People's Coalition totals in the 1986 election.; ^{3} Workers' Party of Spain–Communist Unity results are compared to Communists' Unity Board totals in the 1986 election.; ^{4} Green Alternative–Ecologist Movement of Catalonia results are compared to Green Alternative List totals in the 1986 election.; ^{5} Canarian Nationalist Assembly results are compared to Canarian Assembly–Canarian Nationalist Left totals in the 1986 election.; ^{6} Social Democratic Coalition results are compared to Social Democratic Party of Catalonia totals in the 1986 election.; ^{7} Alliance for the Republic results are compared to Internationalist Socialist Workers' Party totals in the 1986 election.; ^{8} Revolutionary Communist League–Communist Movement results are compared to the combined totals of Communist Movement of the Basque Country and Revolutionary Communist League in the 1986 election.; ^{9} Communist Party of Spain (Marxist–Leninist) results are compared to Republican Popular Unity totals in the 1986 election.

== Summary ==
=== Constituencies ===

Summary of constituency results in the 29 October 1989 Congress of Deputies election
Constituency	PSOE		PP		IU		CDS		CiU		PNV		HB		PA		UV		EA		EE		PAR		AIC	
Constituency	%	S	%	S	%	S	%	S	%	S	%	S	%	S	%	S	%	S	%	S	%	S	%	S	%	S
Álava	25.9	2	14.1	1	3.1	−	6.7	−			16.9	1	11.6	−					8.5	−	8.7	−				
Albacete	49.7	3	30.8	1	8.4	−	7.4	−																		
Alicante	43.8	5	29.4	3	9.0	1	10.0	1									0.6	−								
Almería	52.7	4	23.4	1	8.5	−	8.9	−							2.3	−										
Asturias	40.6	4	26.5	3	15.6	1	12.5	1																		
Ávila	27.8	1	32.8	1	4.4	−	31.5	1																		
Badajoz	54.8	4	23.5	2	8.0	−	10.0	−																		
Balearics	34.5	3	40.7	3	5.1	−	9.2	−																		
Barcelona	37.0	14	10.5	3	8.2	3	4.5	1	30.4	11																
Biscay	20.8	2	9.7	1	3.6	−	3.4	−			27.9	3	15.0	2					7.9	1	7.9	1				
Burgos	32.3	2	43.5	2	7.9	−	10.8	−																		
Cáceres	52.6	3	27.2	2	5.1	−	8.8	−																		
Cádiz	51.9	6	16.3	1	9.6	1	4.2	−							11.3	1										
Cantabria	40.1	3	38.4	2	6.4	−	9.7	−																		
Castellón	41.7	3	33.9	2	5.5	−	8.8	−									1.3	−								
Ceuta	37.7	1	34.3	−			8.2	−																		
Ciudad Real	52.4	3	30.0	2	6.3	−	7.9	−																		
Córdoba	49.4	5	18.2	1	18.3	1	5.0	−							5.9	−										
Cuenca	45.9	2	39.0	1	4.3	−	7.2	−																		
Gerona	28.9	2	7.9	−	3.9	−	3.0	−	46.9	3																
Granada	50.0	4	24.6	2	11.5	1	6.0	−							2.6	−										
Guadalajara	36.5	1	42.8	2	8.4	−	7.6	−																		
Guipúzcoa	19.8	2	7.0	−	2.0	−	2.2	−			16.2	1	22.0	2					17.9	1	10.4	1				
Huelva	58.5	4	19.6	1	7.7	−	4.7	−							5.0	−										
Huesca	40.5	2	25.5	1	7.7	−	8.5	−															12.1	−		
Jaén	54.1	4	24.3	2	11.5	−	4.8	−							2.5	−										
La Coruña	36.8	4	35.8	4	3.9	−	9.0	1																		
La Rioja	39.7	2	41.1	2	6.4	−	7.2	−																		
Las Palmas	32.0	3	20.7	2	10.1	−	24.3	2																	1.8	−
León	39.9	3	38.4	2	6.3	−	10.1	−																		
Lérida	28.6	2	12.4	−	3.7	−	4.0	−	41.8	2																
Lugo	31.4	2	45.8	3	2.0	−	6.1	−																		
Madrid	33.5	12	34.2	12	15.4	5	11.0	4																		
Málaga	51.6	7	19.5	2	13.6	1	5.6	−							5.1	−										
Melilla	38.5	−	55.7	1			1.8	−																		
Murcia	46.1	5	30.0	3	9.2	−	10.4	1																		
Navarre	31.2	2	33.2	3	5.7	−	7.0	−			0.9	−	11.0	−					4.8	−	2.9	−				
Orense	35.4	2	40.7	3	2.0	−	5.6	−																		
Palencia	36.6	1	44.5	2	5.8	−	8.6	−																		
Pontevedra	32.9	4	39.0	4	3.7	−	8.1	−																		
Salamanca	37.0	2	40.7	2	5.7	−	12.5	−																		
Santa Cruz de Tenerife	40.6	4	17.9	1	5.6	−	10.1	1																	18.5	1
Segovia	30.7	1	39.9	2	7.1	−	16.5	−																		
Seville	54.2	8	19.0	2	11.5	1	2.3	−							9.0	1										
Soria	33.0	1	47.9	2	5.1	−	9.4	−																		
Tarragona	34.2	2	13.1	1	5.3	−	4.0	−	34.1	2																
Teruel	40.1	2	32.9	1	4.3	−	8.7	−															10.6	−		
Toledo	47.0	3	34.4	2	7.3	−	8.0	−																		
Valencia	40.1	8	24.2	4	9.9	1	6.5	1									11.5	2								
Valladolid	35.9	2	38.1	3	9.5	−	11.4	−																		
Zamora	37.9	1	42.7	2	4.0	−	11.5	−																		
Zaragoza	38.0	3	27.5	2	11.3	1	7.2	−															10.6	1		
Total	39.6	175	25.8	107	9.1	17	7.9	14	5.0	18	1.2	5	1.1	4	1.0	2	0.7	2	0.7	2	0.5	2	0.4	1	0.3	1

=== Regions ===

Summary of regional results in the 29 October 1989 Congress of Deputies election
Region	PSOE		PP		IU		CDS		CiU		PNV		HB		PA		UV		EA		EE		PAR		AIC	
Region	%	S	%	S	%	S	%	S	%	S	%	S	%	S	%	S	%	S	%	S	%	S	%	S	%	S
Andalusia	52.5	42	20.2	12	12.0	5	4.7	−							6.2	2										
Aragon	38.7	7	27.8	4	9.7	1	7.6	−															10.9	1		
Asturias	40.6	4	26.5	3	15.6	1	12.5	1																		
Balearics	34.5	3	40.7	3	5.1	−	9.2	−																		
Basque Country	21.1	6	9.4	2	3.0	−	3.5	−			22.8	5	16.9	4					11.2	2	8.8	2				
Canary Islands	36.1	7	19.4	3	8.0	−	17.6	3																	9.7	1
Cantabria	40.1	3	38.4	2	6.4	−	9.7	−																		
Castile and León	35.6	14	40.2	18	6.7	−	12.8	1																		
Castilla–La Mancha	48.0	12	33.8	8	7.0	−	7.7	−																		
Catalonia	35.6	20	10.6	4	7.3	3	4.3	1	32.7	18																
Ceuta	37.7	1	34.3	−			8.2	−																		
Extremadura	53.9	7	25.0	4	6.9	−	9.5	−																		
Galicia	34.6	12	39.0	14	3.3	−	7.8	1																		
La Rioja	39.7	2	41.1	2	6.4	−	7.2	−																		
Madrid	33.5	12	34.2	12	15.4	5	11.0	4																		
Melilla	38.5	−	55.7	1			1.8	−																		
Murcia	46.1	5	30.0	3	9.2	−	10.4	1																		
Navarre	31.2	2	33.2	3	5.7	−	7.0	−			0.9	−	11.0	−					4.8	−	2.9	−				
Valencian Community	41.5	16	27.0	9	9.1	2	7.8	2									4.6	2								
Total	39.6	175	25.8	107	9.1	17	7.9	14	5.0	18	1.2	5	1.1	4	1.0	2	0.7	2	0.7	2	0.5	2	0.4	1	0.3	1

== Autonomous communities ==
=== Andalusia ===
← Summary of the 29 October 1989 Congress of Deputies election results in Andalusia →
Parties and alliances	Popular vote			Seats	
Parties and alliances	Votes	%	±pp	Total	+/−
Spanish Socialist Workers' Party of Andalusia (PSOE–A)	1,793,717	52.55	−4.52	42	±0
People's Party (PP)^{1}	688,625	20.17	−2.51	12	−3
United Left–Assembly for Andalusia (IU–CA)	408,733	11.97	+3.87	5	+2
Andalusian Party (PA)	212,687	6.23	+3.44	2	+2
Democratic and Social Centre (CDS)	159,433	4.67	−0.97	0	±0
Ruiz-Mateos Group (Ruiz-Mateos)	51,616	1.51	New	0	±0
The Greens–Green List (LV–LV)	22,244	0.65	New	0	±0
Workers' Party of Spain–Communist Unity (PTE–UC)^{2}	17,720	0.52	−0.60	0	±0
The Ecologist Greens (LVE)	15,724	0.46	New	0	±0
Workers' Socialist Party (PST)	10,856	0.32	+0.13	0	±0
Communist Party of the Andalusian People (PCPA)	6,578	0.19	New	0	±0
Spanish Phalanx of the CNSO (FE–JONS)	3,413	0.10	−0.07	0	±0
Humanist Party (PH)	2,110	0.06	New	0	±0
Alliance for the Republic (AxR)^{3}	1,878	0.06	−0.01	0	±0
Spanish Vertex Ecological Development Revindication (VERDE)	1,436	0.04	±0.00	0	±0
Centrist Unity–Democratic Spanish Party (PED)	1,257	0.04	New	0	±0
Proverist Party (PPr)	245	0.01	New	0	±0
Communist Party of Spain (Marxist–Leninist) (PCE (m–l))^{4}	0	0.00	−0.12	0	±0
Blank ballots	15,374	0.45	+0.01		
Total	3,413,646			61	+1
Valid votes	3,413,646	99.30	+0.65		
Invalid votes	24,108	0.70	−0.65		
Votes cast / turnout	3,437,754	69.33	−1.44		
Abstentions	1,521,041	30.67	+1.44		
Registered voters	4,958,795				
Sources
Footnotes: ^{1} People's Party results are compared to People's Coalition totals in the 1986 election.; ^{2} Workers' Party of Spain–Communist Unity results are compared to Communists' Unity Board totals in the 1986 election.; ^{3} Alliance for the Republic results are compared to Internationalist Socialist Workers' Party totals in the 1986 election.; ^{4} Communist Party of Spain (Marxist–Leninist) results are compared to Republican Popular Unity totals in the 1986 election.

=== Aragon ===
← Summary of the 29 October 1989 Congress of Deputies election results in Aragon →
Parties and alliances	Popular vote			Seats	
Parties and alliances	Votes	%	±pp	Total	+/−
Spanish Socialist Workers' Party (PSOE)	255,342	38.72	−4.71	7	−1
People's Party (PP)^{1}	183,361	27.81	+1.66	4	±0
Regionalist Aragonese Party (PAR)	71,733	10.88	−0.14	1	±0
United Left (IU)	64,200	9.74	+6.35	1	+1
Democratic and Social Centre (CDS)	50,160	7.61	−3.57	0	−1
Ruiz-Mateos Group (Ruiz-Mateos)	6,872	1.04	New	0	±0
The Ecologist Greens (LVE)	4,735	0.72	New	0	±0
Workers' Socialist Party (PST)	4,053	0.61	+0.16	0	±0
Aragonese Union (UA–CHA)	3,156	0.48	New	0	±0
The Greens–Green List (LV–LV)	2,974	0.45	New	0	±0
Workers' Party of Spain–Communist Unity (PTE–UC)^{2}	2,834	0.43	−0.87	0	±0
Social Democratic Coalition (CSD)	1,849	0.28	New	0	±0
Communist Party of the Peoples of Spain (PCPE)	898	0.14	New	0	±0
Spanish Phalanx of the CNSO (FE–JONS)	710	0.11	−0.09	0	±0
Humanist Party (PH)	553	0.08	New	0	±0
Alliance for the Republic (AxR)^{3}	435	0.07	−0.08	0	±0
Communist Party of Spain (Marxist–Leninist) (PCE (m–l))^{4}	0	0.00	−0.16	0	±0
Blank ballots	5,588	0.85	+0.04		
Total	659,453			13	−1
Valid votes	659,453	99.26	+1.34		
Invalid votes	4,913	0.74	−1.34		
Votes cast / turnout	664,366	70.21	−0.38		
Abstentions	281,955	29.79	+0.38		
Registered voters	946,321				
Sources
Footnotes: ^{1} People's Party results are compared to People's Coalition totals in the 1986 election.; ^{2} Workers' Party of Spain–Communist Unity results are compared to Communists' Unity Board totals in the 1986 election.; ^{3} Alliance for the Republic results are compared to Internationalist Socialist Workers' Party totals in the 1986 election.; ^{4} Communist Party of Spain (Marxist–Leninist) results are compared to Republican Popular Unity totals in the 1986 election.

=== Asturias ===
← Summary of the 29 October 1989 Congress of Deputies election results in Asturias →
Parties and alliances	Popular vote			Seats	
Parties and alliances	Votes	%	±pp	Total	+/−
Spanish Socialist Workers' Party (PSOE)	248,584	40.56	−5.43	4	−1
People's Party (PP)^{1}	162,590	26.53	−0.69	3	+1
United Left (IU)	95,494	15.58	+6.37	1	±0
Democratic and Social Centre (CDS)	76,643	12.51	−0.65	1	±0
The Greens–Green List (LV–LV)	4,352	0.71	New	0	±0
Asturianist Party (PAS)	3,526	0.58	New	0	±0
Ruiz-Mateos Group (Ruiz-Mateos)	3,424	0.56	New	0	±0
The Ecologist Greens (LVE)	3,340	0.55	New	0	±0
Asturian Nationalist Unity (UNA)	3,218	0.53	New	0	±0
Workers' Socialist Party (PST)	2,861	0.47	−0.14	0	±0
Workers' Party of Spain–Communist Unity (PTE–UC)^{2}	1,854	0.30	−1.28	0	±0
Communist Party of the Peoples of Spain (PCPE)	1,604	0.26	New	0	±0
Spanish Phalanx of the CNSO (FE–JONS)	751	0.12	−0.13	0	±0
Alliance for the Republic (AxR)^{3}	469	0.08	−0.07	0	±0
Humanist Party (PH)	406	0.07	New	0	±0
Communist Party of Spain (Marxist–Leninist) (PCE (m–l))^{4}	0	0.00	−0.12	0	±0
Blank ballots	3,728	0.61	+0.04		
Total	612,844			9	±0
Valid votes	612,844	99.21	+0.98		
Invalid votes	4,853	0.79	−0.98		
Votes cast / turnout	617,697	68.90	+1.08		
Abstentions	278,788	31.10	−1.08		
Registered voters	896,485				
Sources
Footnotes: ^{1} People's Party results are compared to People's Coalition totals in the 1986 election.; ^{2} Workers' Party of Spain–Communist Unity results are compared to Communists' Unity Board totals in the 1986 election.; ^{3} Alliance for the Republic results are compared to Internationalist Socialist Workers' Party totals in the 1986 election.; ^{4} Communist Party of Spain (Marxist–Leninist) results are compared to Republican Popular Unity totals in the 1986 election.

=== Balearics ===
← Summary of the 29 October 1989 Congress of Deputies election results in the Balearics →
Parties and alliances	Popular vote			Seats	
Parties and alliances	Votes	%	±pp	Total	+/−
People's Party (PP)^{1}	140,163	40.66	+6.35	3	±0
Spanish Socialist Workers' Party (PSOE)	118,833	34.48	−5.80	3	±0
Democratic and Social Centre (CDS)	31,671	9.19	−2.10	0	±0
United Left (IU)	17,555	5.09	+2.76	0	±0
The Greens–Green List (EV–LV)	8,762	2.54	New	0	±0
Ruiz-Mateos Group (Ruiz-Mateos)	8,709	2.53	New	0	±0
Nationalist Left (PSM–ENE)	7,989	2.32	+0.11	0	±0
Balearic Union (UB)	2,883	0.84	New	0	±0
Workers' Socialist Party (PST)	1,621	0.47	New	0	±0
Communist Party of the Peoples of Spain (PCPE)	1,050	0.30	New	0	±0
Workers' Party of Spain–Communist Unity (PTE–UC)^{2}	772	0.22	−0.28	0	±0
Spanish Phalanx of the CNSO (FE–JONS)	541	0.16	−0.15	0	±0
Revolutionary Workers' Party of Spain (PORE)	431	0.13	−0.05	0	±0
Balearic Radical Party (PRB)	398	0.12	New	0	±0
Alliance for the Republic (AxR)^{3}	327	0.09	−0.08	0	±0
Social Democratic Coalition (CSD)	0	0.00	New	0	±0
Blank ballots	2,976	0.86	+0.14		
Total	344,681			6	±0
Valid votes	344,681	98.83	+1.01		
Invalid votes	4,098	1.17	−1.01		
Votes cast / turnout	348,779	63.54	−2.48		
Abstentions	200,160	36.46	+2.48		
Registered voters	548,939				
Sources
Footnotes: ^{1} People's Party results are compared to People's Coalition totals in the 1986 election.; ^{2} Workers' Party of Spain–Communist Unity results are compared to Communists' Unity Board totals in the 1986 election.; ^{3} Alliance for the Republic results are compared to Internationalist Socialist Workers' Party totals in the 1986 election.

=== Basque Country ===
← Summary of the 29 October 1989 Congress of Deputies election results in the Basque Country →
Parties and alliances	Popular vote			Seats	
Parties and alliances	Votes	%	±pp	Total	+/−
Basque Nationalist Party (EAJ/PNV)	252,119	22.78	−5.04	5	−1
Socialist Party of the Basque Country (PSE–PSOE)	233,650	21.11	−5.18	6	−1
Popular Unity (HB)	186,646	16.86	−0.83	4	±0
Basque Solidarity (EA)	123,613	11.17	New	2	+2
People's Party (PP)^{1}	103,697	9.37	−1.13	2	±0
Basque Country Left (EE)	97,289	8.79	−0.29	2	±0
Democratic and Social Centre (CDS)	38,313	3.46	−1.54	0	±0
United Left (IU/EB)	33,323	3.01	+1.76	0	±0
The Ecologist Greens (LVE)	9,820	0.89	New	0	±0
Ruiz-Mateos Group (Ruiz-Mateos)	7,765	0.70	New	0	±0
Workers' Party of the Basque Country–Basque Country Workers (PTE–EL)^{2}	4,714	0.43	−0.51	0	±0
Workers' Socialist Party (PST)	3,388	0.31	−0.08	0	±0
Communist Party of the Peoples of Spain (PCPE)	1,047	0.09	New	0	±0
Ecologist Party of the Basque Country–Green List (PEE–(LV))	931	0.08	New	0	±0
Humanist Party (PH)	882	0.08	New	0	±0
Revolutionary Workers' Party of Spain (PORE)	863	0.08	New	0	±0
Spanish Phalanx of the CNSO (FE–JONS)	753	0.07	±0.00	0	±0
Alliance for the Republic (AxR)^{3}	664	0.06	−0.07	0	±0
Communist Party of Spain (Marxist–Leninist) (PCE (m–l))^{4}	0	0.00	−0.13	0	±0
Revolutionary Communist League–Communist Movement (LKI–EMK)^{5}	0	0.00	±0.00	0	±0
Blank ballots	7,464	0.67	+0.16		
Total	1,106,941			21	±0
Valid votes	1,106,941	99.17	+0.82		
Invalid votes	9,247	0.83	−0.82		
Votes cast / turnout	1,116,188	66.90	−0.68		
Abstentions	552,220	33.10	+0.68		
Registered voters	1,668,408				
Sources
Footnotes: ^{1} People's Party results are compared to People's Coalition totals in the 1986 election.; ^{2} Workers' Party of the Basque Country–Basque Country Workers results are compared to Communist Party of the Basque Country totals in the 1986 election.; ^{3} Alliance for the Republic results are compared to Internationalist Socialist Workers' Party totals in the 1986 election.; ^{4} Communist Party of Spain (Marxist–Leninist) results are compared to Republican Popular Unity totals in the 1986 election.; ^{5} Revolutionary Communist League–Communist Movement results are compared to the combined totals of Communist Movement of the Basque Country and Revolutionary Communist League in the 1986 election.

=== Canary Islands ===
← Summary of the 29 October 1989 Congress of Deputies election results in the Canary Islands →
Parties and alliances	Popular vote			Seats	
Parties and alliances	Votes	%	±pp	Total	+/−
Spanish Socialist Workers' Party (PSOE)	242,035	36.10	+0.04	7	+1
People's Party (PP)^{1}	130,043	19.39	−3.91	3	±0
Democratic and Social Centre (CDS)	117,897	17.58	+0.68	3	±0
Canarian Independent Groups (AIC)	64,767	9.66	−0.16	1	±0
United Left–United Canarian Left (IU–ICU)	53,364	7.96	+3.65	0	±0
Canarian Nationalist Assembly (ACN)^{2}	21,539	3.21	−2.31	0	±0
Ruiz-Mateos Group (Ruiz-Mateos)	10,117	1.51	New	0	±0
Independents of Gran Canaria (IGC)	6,371	0.95	New	0	±0
The Greens–Green List (LV–LV)	6,138	0.92	+0.70	0	±0
The Ecologist Greens (LVE)	4,693	0.70	New	0	±0
Workers' Socialist Party (PST)	3,513	0.52	−0.25	0	±0
Workers' Party of Spain–Communist Unity (PTE–UC)	1,654	0.25	New	0	±0
Communist Party of the Canarian People (PCPC)	1,500	0.22	New	0	±0
Seven Green Stars (SEV)	1,411	0.21	New	0	±0
Humanist Party (PH)	910	0.14	New	0	±0
Spanish Phalanx of the CNSO (FE–JONS)	767	0.11	−0.11	0	±0
Lanzarote Assembly (Tagoror)	472	0.07	New	0	±0
Communist Party of Spain (Marxist–Leninist) (PCE (m–l))^{3}	0	0.00	−0.14	0	±0
Blank ballots	3,348	0.50	+0.12		
Total	670,539			14	+1
Valid votes	670,539	99.08	+1.10		
Invalid votes	6,207	0.92	−1.10		
Votes cast / turnout	676,746	62.15	−6.13		
Abstentions	412,187	37.85	+6.13		
Registered voters	1,088,933				
Sources
Footnotes: ^{1} People's Party results are compared to People's Coalition totals in the 1986 election.; ^{2} Canarian Nationalist Assembly results are compared to Canarian Assembly–Canarian Nationalist Left totals in the 1986 election.; ^{3} Communist Party of Spain (Marxist–Leninist) results are compared to Republican Popular Unity totals in the 1986 election.

=== Cantabria ===
← Summary of the 29 October 1989 Congress of Deputies election results in Cantabria →
Parties and alliances	Popular vote			Seats	
Parties and alliances	Votes	%	±pp	Total	+/−
Spanish Socialist Workers' Party (PSOE)	119,352	40.07	−4.26	3	±0
People's Party (PP)^{1}	114,403	38.41	+4.35	2	±0
Democratic and Social Centre (CDS)	28,976	9.73	−3.23	0	±0
United Left (IU)	19,058	6.40	+3.31	0	±0
The Ecologist Greens (LVE)	2,481	0.83	New	0	±0
Ruiz-Mateos Group (Ruiz-Mateos)	2,208	0.74	New	0	±0
The Greens (LV)	1,860	0.62	New	0	±0
Workers' Socialist Party (PST)	1,727	0.58	−0.01	0	±0
Workers' Party of Spain–Communist Unity (PTE–UC)^{2}	1,291	0.43	−0.83	0	±0
Communist Party of the Peoples of Spain (PCPE)	1,132	0.38	New	0	±0
Radicals for Cantabria (RxC)	904	0.30	New	0	±0
Spanish Phalanx of the CNSO (FE–JONS)	868	0.29	−0.23	0	±0
Humanist Party (PH)	347	0.12	New	0	±0
Alliance for the Republic (AxR)^{3}	256	0.09	−0.18	0	±0
Asturianist Party (PAS)	186	0.06	New	0	±0
Blank ballots	2,824	0.95	+0.14		
Total	297,873			5	±0
Valid votes	297,873	98.92	+0.99		
Invalid votes	3,245	1.08	−0.99		
Votes cast / turnout	301,118	74.28	+0.85		
Abstentions	104,263	25.72	−0.85		
Registered voters	405,381				
Sources
Footnotes: ^{1} People's Party results are compared to People's Coalition totals in the 1986 election.; ^{2} Workers' Party of Spain–Communist Unity results are compared to Communists' Unity Board totals in the 1986 election.; ^{3} Alliance for the Republic results are compared to Internationalist Socialist Workers' Party totals in the 1986 election.

=== Castile and León ===
← Summary of the 29 October 1989 Congress of Deputies election results in Castile and León →
Parties and alliances	Popular vote			Seats	
Parties and alliances	Votes	%	±pp	Total	+/−
People's Party (PP)^{1}	597,206	40.25	+4.43	18	+4
Spanish Socialist Workers' Party (PSOE)	527,551	35.55	−3.24	14	−2
Democratic and Social Centre (CDS)	189,194	12.75	−4.71	1	−3
United Left (IU)	98,699	6.65	+4.15	0	±0
The Ecologist Greens (LVE)	12,348	0.83	New	0	±0
Ruiz-Mateos Group (Ruiz-Mateos)	9,684	0.65	New	0	±0
The Greens–Green List (LV–LV)	8,597	0.58	New	0	±0
Workers' Socialist Party (PST)	7,971	0.54	+0.02	0	±0
Workers' Party of Spain–Communist Unity (PTE–UC)^{2}	5,355	0.36	−0.73	0	±0
Regionalist Party of the Leonese Country (PREPAL)	2,962	0.20	+0.03	0	±0
Communist Party of the Peoples of Spain (PCPE)	2,697	0.18	New	0	±0
Spanish Phalanx of the CNSO (FE–JONS)	2,172	0.15	−0.14	0	±0
Humanist Party (PH)	1,763	0.12	New	0	±0
Alliance for the Republic (AxR)^{3}	1,369	0.09	−0.02	0	±0
Nationalist Party of Castile and León (PANCAL)	1,199	0.08	−0.01	0	±0
Centrist Unity–Democratic Spanish Party (PED)	285	0.02	New	0	±0
Communist Party of Spain (Marxist–Leninist) (PCE (m–l))^{4}	0	0.00	−0.20	0	±0
Blank ballots	14,783	1.00	+0.10		
Total	1,483,835			33	−1
Valid votes	1,483,835	98.90	+0.90		
Invalid votes	16,461	1.10	−0.90		
Votes cast / turnout	1,500,296	73.35	+0.54		
Abstentions	545,217	26.65	−0.54		
Registered voters	2,045,513				
Sources
Footnotes: ^{1} People's Party results are compared to People's Coalition totals in the 1986 election.; ^{2} Workers' Party of Spain–Communist Unity results are compared to Communists' Unity Board totals in the 1986 election.; ^{3} Alliance for the Republic results are compared to Internationalist Socialist Workers' Party totals in the 1986 election.; ^{4} Communist Party of Spain (Marxist–Leninist) results are compared to Republican Popular Unity totals in the 1986 election.

=== Castilla–La Mancha ===
← Summary of the 29 October 1989 Congress of Deputies election results in Castilla–La Mancha →
Parties and alliances	Popular vote			Seats	
Parties and alliances	Votes	%	±pp	Total	+/−
Spanish Socialist Workers' Party (PSOE)	466,964	47.96	+0.17	12	±0
People's Party (PP)^{1}	328,714	33.76	−1.05	8	±0
Democratic and Social Centre (CDS)	75,298	7.73	−1.99	0	±0
United Left (IU)	67,727	6.96	+2.88	0	±0
Ruiz-Mateos Group (Ruiz-Mateos)	6,856	0.70	New	0	±0
The Ecologist Greens (LVE)	4,791	0.49	New	0	±0
The Greens–Green List (LV–LV)	4,634	0.48	New	0	±0
Workers' Socialist Party (PST)	3,573	0.37	+0.06	0	±0
Workers' Party of Spain–Communist Unity (PTE–UC)^{2}	2,681	0.28	−0.50	0	±0
Communist Party of the Peoples of Spain (PCPE)	1,500	0.15	New	0	±0
Spanish Phalanx of the CNSO (FE–JONS)	1,297	0.13	−0.35	0	±0
Spanish Vertex Ecological Development Revindication (VERDE)	1,143	0.12	New	0	±0
Humanist Party (PH)	709	0.07	New	0	±0
Centrist Unity–Democratic Spanish Party (PED)	681	0.07	New	0	±0
Alliance for the Republic (AxR)^{3}	560	0.06	−0.05	0	±0
Regionalist Party of Guadalajara (PRGU)	426	0.04	New	0	±0
Communist Party of Spain (Marxist–Leninist) (PCE (m–l))^{4}	0	0.00	−0.15	0	±0
Blank ballots	6,105	0.63	+0.02		
Total	973,659			20	±0
Valid votes	973,659	99.16	+0.60		
Invalid votes	8,209	0.84	−0.60		
Votes cast / turnout	981,868	76.44	+1.35		
Abstentions	302,642	23.56	−1.35		
Registered voters	1,284,510				
Sources
Footnotes: ^{1} People's Party results are compared to People's Coalition totals in the 1986 election.; ^{2} Workers' Party of Spain–Communist Unity results are compared to Communists' Unity Board totals in the 1986 election.; ^{3} Alliance for the Republic results are compared to Internationalist Socialist Workers' Party totals in the 1986 election.; ^{4} Communist Party of Spain (Marxist–Leninist) results are compared to Republican Popular Unity totals in the 1986 election.

=== Catalonia ===
← Summary of the 29 October 1989 Congress of Deputies election results in Catalonia →
Parties and alliances	Popular vote			Seats	
Parties and alliances	Votes	%	±pp	Total	+/−
Socialists' Party of Catalonia (PSC–PSOE)	1,123,975	35.59	−5.41	20	−1
Convergence and Union (CiU)	1,032,243	32.68	+0.68	18	±0
People's Party (PP)^{1}	336,015	10.64	−0.76	4	−2
Initiative for Catalonia (IC)^{2}	231,452	7.33	+3.42	3	+2
Democratic and Social Centre (CDS)	136,518	4.32	+0.20	1	±0
Republican Left of Catalonia (ERC)	84,756	2.68	+0.01	0	±0
Ruiz-Mateos Group (Ruiz-Mateos)	37,942	1.20	New	0	±0
Party of the Communists of Catalonia (PCC)	31,966	1.01	−0.59	0	±0
Green Alternative–Ecologist Movement of Catalonia (AV–MEC)^{3}	25,978	0.82	+0.10	0	±0
The Ecologist Greens (EVE)	24,406	0.77	New	0	±0
The Greens–Green List (EV–LV)	19,444	0.62	New	0	±0
Workers' Party of Spain–Communist Unity (PTE–UC)^{4}	13,137	0.42	−0.15	0	±0
Workers' Socialist Party (PST)	12,322	0.39	+0.03	0	±0
Ecologist Party of Catalonia–VERDE (PEC–VERDE)	10,054	0.32	−0.05	0	±0
Social Democratic Coalition (CSD)^{5}	6,435	0.20	+0.05	0	±0
Revolutionary Workers' Party of Spain (PORE)	3,022	0.10	+0.02	0	±0
Humanist Party of Catalonia (PHC)	2,653	0.08	New	0	±0
Spanish Phalanx of the CNSO (FE–JONS)	2,506	0.08	−0.03	0	±0
Centrist Unity–Democratic Spanish Party (PED)	1,662	0.05	+0.01	0	±0
Alliance for the Republic (AxR)^{6}	1,619	0.05	−0.06	0	±0
Valencian Nationalist Left–Valencian Regional Union (ENV–URV)	890	0.03	New	0	±0
Communist Party of Spain (Marxist–Leninist) (PCE (m–l))^{7}	0	0.00	−0.11	0	±0
Blank ballots	19,252	0.61	+0.19		
Total	3,158,247			46	−1
Valid votes	3,158,247	99.44	+0.29		
Invalid votes	17,660	0.56	−0.29		
Votes cast / turnout	3,175,907	67.62	−1.33		
Abstentions	1,521,105	32.38	+1.33		
Registered voters	4,697,012				
Sources
Footnotes: ^{1} People's Party results are compared to People's Coalition totals in the 1986 election.; ^{2} Initiative for Catalonia results are compared to Union of the Catalan Left totals in the 1986 election.; ^{3} Green Alternative–Ecologist Movement of Catalonia results are compared to Green Alternative List totals in the 1986 election.; ^{4} Workers' Party of Spain–Communist Unity results are compared to Communists' Unity Board totals in the 1986 election.; ^{5} Social Democratic Coalition results are compared to Social Democratic Party of Catalonia totals in the 1986 election.; ^{6} Alliance for the Republic results are compared to Internationalist Socialist Workers' Party totals in the 1986 election.; ^{7} Communist Party of Spain (Marxist–Leninist) results are compared to Republican Popular Unity totals in the 1986 election.

=== Extremadura ===
← Summary of the 29 October 1989 Congress of Deputies election results in Extremadura →
Parties and alliances	Popular vote			Seats	
Parties and alliances	Votes	%	±pp	Total	+/−
Spanish Socialist Workers' Party (PSOE)	330,869	53.90	−1.98	7	±0
People's Party (PP)^{1}	153,261	24.97	−1.76	4	±0
Democratic and Social Centre (CDS)	58,443	9.52	+1.48	0	±0
United Left (IU)	42,166	6.87	+2.97	0	±0
United Extremadura (EU)	10,984	1.79	−0.88	0	±0
Ruiz-Mateos Group (Ruiz-Mateos)	3,618	0.59	New	0	±0
The Ecologist Greens (LVE)	2,196	0.36	New	0	±0
Workers' Socialist Party (PST)	1,944	0.32	+0.01	0	±0
The Greens–Green List (LV–LV)	1,652	0.27	New	0	±0
Workers' Party of Spain–Communist Unity (PTE–UC)^{2}	1,650	0.27	−0.44	0	±0
Communist Party of the Peoples of Spain (PCPE)	1,542	0.25	New	0	±0
Spanish Vertex Ecological Development Revindication (VERDE)	1,211	0.20	New	0	±0
Spanish Phalanx of the CNSO (FE–JONS)	796	0.13	+0.04	0	±0
Humanist Party (PH)	318	0.05	New	0	±0
Alliance for the Republic (AxR)^{3}	266	0.04	−0.07	0	±0
Blank ballots	2,885	0.47	−0.05		
Total	613,801			11	±0
Valid votes	613,801	99.28	+0.52		
Invalid votes	4,464	0.72	−0.52		
Votes cast / turnout	618,265	75.57	+1.99		
Abstentions	199,878	24.43	−1.99		
Registered voters	818,143				
Sources
Footnotes: ^{1} People's Party results are compared to People's Coalition totals in the 1986 election.; ^{2} Workers' Party of Spain–Communist Unity results are compared to Communists' Unity Board totals in the 1986 election.; ^{3} Alliance for the Republic results are compared to Internationalist Socialist Workers' Party totals in the 1986 election.

=== Galicia ===
← Summary of the 29 October 1989 Congress of Deputies election results in Galicia →
Parties and alliances	Popular vote			Seats	
Parties and alliances	Votes	%	±pp	Total	+/−
People's Party (PP)^{1}	519,168	39.02	−0.17	14	+1
Socialists' Party of Galicia (PSdeG–PSOE)	459,750	34.56	−1.20	12	+1
Democratic and Social Centre (CDS)	103,762	7.80	−0.77	1	−1
Galician Nationalist Bloc (BNG)	47,763	3.59	+1.48	0	±0
Galician Coalition (CG)	45,821	3.44	−2.80	0	−1
United Left (EU)	43,645	3.28	+2.14	0	±0
Galician Socialist Party–Galician Left (PSG–EG)	34,131	2.57	−0.99	0	±0
Galician Nationalist Party–Galicianist Party (PNG–PG)	14,411	1.08	New	0	±0
Ruiz-Mateos Group (Ruiz-Mateos)	13,060	0.98	New	0	±0
Workers' Socialist Party (PST)	6,980	0.52	−0.12	0	±0
The Ecologist Greens (LVE)	6,549	0.49	New	0	±0
The Greens–Green List (LV–LV)	5,793	0.44	New	0	±0
Workers' Party of Spain–Communist Unity (PTE–UC)^{2}	5,280	0.40	−0.54	0	±0
Galician People's Front (FPG)	3,657	0.27	New	0	±0
Communist Party of the Galician People (PCPG)	1,801	0.14	New	0	±0
Spanish Vertex Ecological Development Revindication (VERDE)	1,539	0.12	+0.01	0	±0
Revolutionary Workers' Party of Spain (PORE)	1,503	0.11	New	0	±0
Humanist Party (PH)	1,482	0.11	New	0	±0
Spanish Phalanx of the CNSO (FE–JONS)	1,429	0.11	−0.07	0	±0
Asturianist Party (PAS)	935	0.07	New	0	±0
Alliance for the Republic (AxR)^{3}	590	0.04	−0.04	0	±0
Communist Party of Spain (Marxist–Leninist) (PCE (m–l))^{4}	0	0.00	−0.17	0	±0
Blank ballots	11,339	0.85	+0.30		
Total	1,330,388			27	±0
Valid votes	1,330,388	98.87	+0.24		
Invalid votes	15,265	1.13	−0.24		
Votes cast / turnout	1,345,653	60.13	+2.24		
Abstentions	892,320	39.87	−2.24		
Registered voters	2,237,973				
Sources
Footnotes: ^{1} People's Party results are compared to People's Coalition totals in the 1986 election.; ^{2} Workers' Party of Spain–Communist Unity results are compared to Communists' Unity Board totals in the 1986 election.; ^{3} Alliance for the Republic results are compared to Internationalist Socialist Workers' Party totals in the 1986 election.; ^{4} Communist Party of Spain (Marxist–Leninist) results are compared to Republican Popular Unity totals in the 1986 election.

=== La Rioja ===
← Summary of the 29 October 1989 Congress of Deputies election results in La Rioja →
Parties and alliances	Popular vote			Seats	
Parties and alliances	Votes	%	±pp	Total	+/−
People's Party (PP)^{1}	60,737	41.09	+1.87	2	±0
Spanish Socialist Workers' Party (PSOE)	58,678	39.70	−4.22	2	±0
Democratic and Social Centre (CDS)	10,620	7.18	−2.90	0	±0
United Left (IU)	9,495	6.42	+4.42	0	±0
The Ecologist Greens (LVE)	1,893	1.28	New	0	±0
Ruiz-Mateos Group (Ruiz-Mateos)	1,823	1.23	New	0	±0
Workers' Socialist Party (PST)	848	0.57	New	0	±0
Social Democratic Coalition (CSD)	769	0.52	New	0	±0
Workers' Party of Spain–Communist Unity (PTE–UC)^{2}	679	0.46	−0.57	0	±0
Communist Party of the Peoples of Spain (PCPE)	271	0.18	New	0	±0
Spanish Phalanx of the CNSO (FE–JONS)	220	0.15	−0.10	0	±0
Blank ballots	1,775	1.20	+0.28		
Total	147,808			4	±0
Valid votes	147,808	99.11	+1.07		
Invalid votes	1,326	0.89	−1.07		
Votes cast / turnout	149,134	72.04	−2.27		
Abstentions	57,875	27.96	+2.27		
Registered voters	207,009				
Sources
Footnotes: ^{1} People's Party results are compared to People's Coalition totals in the 1986 election.; ^{2} Workers' Party of Spain–Communist Unity results are compared to Communists' Unity Board totals in the 1986 election.

=== Madrid ===
← Summary of the 29 October 1989 Congress of Deputies election results in Madrid →
Parties and alliances	Popular vote			Seats	
Parties and alliances	Votes	%	±pp	Total	+/−
People's Party (PP)^{1}	919,357	34.22	+2.25	12	+1
Spanish Socialist Workers' Party (PSOE)	899,723	33.49	−7.32	12	−3
United Left (IU)	414,392	15.42	+9.39	5	+3
Democratic and Social Centre (CDS)	295,189	10.99	−2.95	4	−1
The Greens–Green List (LV–LV)	30,495	1.14	+0.42	0	±0
Ruiz-Mateos Group (Ruiz-Mateos)	25,539	0.95	New	0	±0
The Ecologist Greens (LVE)	23,996	0.89	New	0	±0
Workers' Party of Spain–Communist Unity (PTE–UC)^{2}	11,621	0.43	−2.04	0	±0
Workers' Socialist Party (PST)	8,427	0.31	−0.13	0	±0
Spanish Vertex Ecological Development Revindication (VERDE)	4,963	0.18	−0.10	0	±0
Spanish Phalanx of the CNSO (FE–JONS)	3,657	0.14	−0.16	0	±0
Regional Party of Madrid (PAM)	3,396	0.13	New	0	±0
Group of Madrid Radicals (GRM)	3,330	0.12	New	0	±0
Communist Party of the Peoples of Spain (PCPE)	3,002	0.11	New	0	±0
Humanist Party (PH)	1,973	0.07	New	0	±0
Liberal and Social Democratic Coalition (CSD y L)	1,888	0.07	New	0	±0
Revolutionary Workers' Party of Spain (PORE)	1,847	0.07	−0.01	0	±0
Alliance for the Republic (AxR)^{3}	1,632	0.06	±0.00	0	±0
Independent Citizen Group (ACI)	1,359	0.05	New	0	±0
Centrist Unity–Democratic Spanish Party (PED)	1,057	0.04	New	0	±0
Spanish Democratic Republican Action (ARDE)	975	0.04	New	0	±0
Independent Spanish Phalanx (FEI)	827	0.03	New	0	±0
Asturianist Party (PAS)	767	0.03	New	0	±0
Communist Party of Spain (Marxist–Leninist) (PCE (m–l))^{4}	0	0.00	−0.08	0	±0
Blank ballots	27,303	1.02	+0.06		
Total	2,686,715			33	±0
Valid votes	2,686,715	99.47	+1.18		
Invalid votes	14,227	0.53	−1.18		
Votes cast / turnout	2,700,942	72.72	−1.18		
Abstentions	1,012,999	27.28	+1.18		
Registered voters	3,713,941				
Sources
Footnotes: ^{1} People's Party results are compared to People's Coalition totals in the 1986 election.; ^{2} Workers' Party of Spain–Communist Unity results are compared to Communists' Unity Board totals in the 1986 election.; ^{3} Alliance for the Republic results are compared to Internationalist Socialist Workers' Party totals in the 1986 election.; ^{4} Communist Party of Spain (Marxist–Leninist) results are compared to Republican Popular Unity totals in the 1986 election.

=== Murcia ===
← Summary of the 29 October 1989 Congress of Deputies election results in Murcia →
Parties and alliances	Popular vote			Seats	
Parties and alliances	Votes	%	±pp	Total	+/−
Spanish Socialist Workers' Party (PSOE)	256,107	46.06	−2.79	5	±0
People's Party (PP)^{1}	166,712	29.98	−4.35	3	±0
Democratic and Social Centre (CDS)	57,634	10.36	+2.02	1	+1
United Left (IU)	51,105	9.19	+4.67	0	±0
Ruiz-Mateos Group (Ruiz-Mateos)	6,253	1.12	New	0	±0
The Ecologist Greens (LVE)	3,905	0.70	New	0	±0
The Greens–Green List (LV–LV)	3,589	0.65	New	0	±0
Workers' Socialist Party (PST)	2,963	0.53	+0.16	0	±0
Communist Party of the Peoples of Spain (PCPE)	1,602	0.29	New	0	±0
Workers' Party of Spain–Communist Unity (PTE–UC)^{2}	1,557	0.28	−0.28	0	±0
Spanish Phalanx of the CNSO (FE–JONS)	836	0.15	−0.13	0	±0
Humanist Party (PH)	633	0.11	New	0	±0
Alliance for the Republic (AxR)^{3}	547	0.10	−0.06	0	±0
Blank ballots	2,640	0.47	−0.02		
Total	556,083			9	+1
Valid votes	556,083	99.33	+0.82		
Invalid votes	3,741	0.67	−0.82		
Votes cast / turnout	559,824	74.25	−0.41		
Abstentions	194,156	25.75	+0.41		
Registered voters	753,980				
Sources
Footnotes: ^{1} People's Party results are compared to People's Coalition totals in the 1986 election.; ^{2} Workers' Party of Spain–Communist Unity results are compared to Communists' Unity Board totals in the 1986 election.; ^{3} Alliance for the Republic results are compared to Internationalist Socialist Workers' Party totals in the 1986 election.

=== Navarre ===
← Summary of the 29 October 1989 Congress of Deputies election results in Navarre →
Parties and alliances	Popular vote			Seats	
Parties and alliances	Votes	%	±pp	Total	+/−
Navarrese People's Union–People's Party (UPN–PP)^{1}	92,216	33.18	+3.55	3	+1
Spanish Socialist Workers' Party (PSOE)	86,677	31.19	−4.33	2	±0
Popular Unity (HB)	30,632	11.02	−2.89	0	−1
Democratic and Social Centre (CDS)	19,538	7.03	−2.53	0	±0
United Left (IU)	15,979	5.75	+4.20	0	±0
Basque Solidarity (EA)	13,342	4.80	New	0	±0
Basque Country Left (EE)	7,949	2.86	+0.06	0	±0
Nationalists of Navarre (PNV–NV)	2,562	0.92	−0.89	0	±0
Ruiz-Mateos Group (Ruiz-Mateos)	1,867	0.67	New	0	±0
Social Democratic Coalition (CSD)	1,541	0.55	New	0	±0
Workers' Socialist Party (PST)	1,105	0.40	−0.04	0	±0
Workers' Party of Spain–Communist Unity (PTE–UC)^{2}	510	0.18	−0.39	0	±0
Communist Party of the Peoples of Spain (PCPE)	333	0.12	New	0	±0
Alliance for the Republic (AxR)^{3}	275	0.10	−0.03	0	±0
Revolutionary Workers' Party of Spain (PORE)	240	0.09	New	0	±0
Spanish Phalanx of the CNSO (FE–JONS)	211	0.08	New	0	±0
Communist Party of Spain (Marxist–Leninist) (PCE (m–l))^{4}	0	0.00	−0.16	0	±0
Revolutionary Communist League–Communist Movement (LKI–EMK)^{5}	0	0.00	±0.00	0	±0
Blank ballots	2,960	1.06	+0.07		
Total	277,937			5	±0
Valid votes	277,937	99.21	+1.19		
Invalid votes	2,213	0.79	−1.19		
Votes cast / turnout	280,150	68.54	−1.26		
Abstentions	128,568	31.46	+1.26		
Registered voters	408,718				
Sources
Footnotes: ^{1} Navarrese People's Union–People's Party results are compared to People's Coalition totals in the 1986 election.; ^{2} Workers' Party of Spain–Communist Unity results are compared to Communists' Unity Board totals in the 1986 election.; ^{3} Alliance for the Republic results are compared to Internationalist Socialist Workers' Party totals in the 1986 election.; ^{4} Communist Party of Spain (Marxist–Leninist) results are compared to Republican Popular Unity totals in the 1986 election.; ^{5} Revolutionary Communist League–Communist Movement results are compared to the combined totals of Communist Movement of the Basque Country and Revolutionary Communist League in the 1986 election.

=== Valencian Community ===
← Summary of the 29 October 1989 Congress of Deputies election results in the Valencian Community →
Parties and alliances	Popular vote			Seats	
Parties and alliances	Votes	%	±pp	Total	+/−
Spanish Socialist Workers' Party (PSOE)	878,377	41.46	−6.03	16	−2
People's Party (PP)^{1}	572,101	27.00	−1.84	9	−1
United Left–United Left of the Valencian Country (IU–EU)	192,201	9.07	+4.37	2	+2
Democratic and Social Centre (CDS)	166,231	7.85	−0.93	2	±0
Valencian Union (UV)	144,924	6.84	+3.76	2	+1
Valencian People's Union (UPV)	40,767	1.92	±0.00	0	±0
The Greens–Green List (LV–LV)	35,813	1.69	+1.12	0	±0
Ruiz-Mateos Group (Ruiz-Mateos)	21,925	1.03	New	0	±0
The Ecologist Greens (LVE)	15,458	0.73	New	0	±0
Workers' Party of Spain–Communist Unity (PTE–UC)^{2}	12,948	0.61	−0.83	0	±0
Workers' Socialist Party (PST)	6,786	0.32	−0.09	0	±0
Social Democratic Coalition (CSD)	4,613	0.22	New	0	±0
Communist Party of the Peoples of Spain (PCPE)	4,026	0.19	New	0	±0
Spanish Phalanx of the CNSO (FE–JONS)	3,098	0.15	−0.09	0	±0
Valencian Nationalist Left–Valencian Regional Union (ENV–URV)	2,098	0.10	±0.00	0	±0
Alliance for the Republic (AxR)^{3}	1,920	0.09	−0.02	0	±0
Green Movement (MV)	1,368	0.06	New	0	±0
Humanist Party (PH)	1,197	0.06	New	0	±0
Cantonalist Party of the Alicantine Country (Alicantón)	1,041	0.05	New	0	±0
Spanish Vertex Ecological Development Revindication (VERDE)	889	0.04	−0.10	0	±0
Communist Party of Spain (Marxist–Leninist) (PCE (m–l))^{4}	0	0.00	−0.15	0	±0
Blank ballots	11,024	0.52	+0.04		
Total	2,118,805			31	±0
Valid votes	2,118,805	99.43	+1.59		
Invalid votes	12,108	0.57	−1.59		
Votes cast / turnout	2,130,913	74.80	−1.60		
Abstentions	717,743	25.20	+1.60		
Registered voters	2,848,656				
Sources
Footnotes: ^{1} People's Party results are compared to People's Coalition totals in the 1986 election.; ^{2} Workers' Party of Spain–Communist Unity results are compared to Communists' Unity Board totals in the 1986 election.; ^{3} Alliance for the Republic results are compared to Internationalist Socialist Workers' Party totals in the 1986 election.; ^{4} Communist Party of Spain (Marxist–Leninist) results are compared to Republican Popular Unity totals in the 1986 election.

== Autonomous cities ==
=== Ceuta ===
← Summary of the 29 October 1989 Congress of Deputies election results in Ceuta →
Parties and alliances	Popular vote			Seats	
Parties and alliances	Votes	%	±pp	Total	+/−
Spanish Socialist Workers' Party (PSOE)	8,643	37.71	−7.52	1	±0
People's Party (PP)^{1}	7,855	34.27	−2.07	0	±0
United Ceuta (CEU)	2,760	12.04	New	0	±0
Democratic and Social Centre (CDS)	1,880	8.20	+0.23	0	±0
The Greens–Green List (LV–LV)	756	3.30	New	0	±0
Ruiz-Mateos Group (Ruiz-Mateos)	605	2.64	New	0	±0
Workers' Socialist Party (PST)	150	0.65	+0.17	0	±0
Blank ballots	270	1.18	+0.62		
Total	22,919			1	±0
Valid votes	22,919	99.08	+0.42		
Invalid votes	212	0.92	−0.42		
Votes cast / turnout	23,131	55.94	−0.76		
Abstentions	18,222	44.06	+0.76		
Registered voters	41,353				
Sources
Footnotes: ^{1} People's Party results are compared to People's Coalition totals in the 1986 election.

=== Melilla ===
The results of the 1989 general election in Melilla were declared void by the Spanish Supreme Court because of perceived irregularities in the ballot counting process and the initial vote tally awarding the district's only seat to the Spanish Socialist Workers' Party being extremely close. A by-election was held on 25 March 1990, in which the district's seat was won by the People's Party by a wide margin, preventing the PSOE from commanding an overall majority in the Congress of Deputies.

Rerun vote

← Summary of the 25 March 1990 Congress of Deputies election results in Melilla →
Parties and alliances	Popular vote			Seats	
Parties and alliances	Votes	%	±pp	Total	+/−
People's Party (PP)	9,748	55.68	+16.28	1	+1
Spanish Socialist Workers' Party (PSOE)	6,741	38.50	−3.50	0	−1
Democratic and Social Centre (CDS)	316	1.80	−6.64	0	±0
Spanish Nationalist Party of Melilla (PNEM)	301	1.72	−5.34	0	±0
Workers' Socialist Party (PST)	130	0.74	+0.07	0	±0
Communist Party of the Peoples of Spain (PCPE)	115	0.66	−0.39	0	±0
Blank ballots	157	0.90	−0.49		
Total	17,508			1	±0
Valid votes	17,508	99.29	+0.57		
Invalid votes	126	0.71	−0.57		
Votes cast / turnout	17,634	51.89	−6.06		
Abstentions	16,351	48.11	+6.06		
Registered voters	33,985				

Annulled vote

← Summary of the 29 October 1989 Congress of Deputies election results in Melilla →
Parties and alliances	Popular vote			Seats	
Parties and alliances	Votes	%	±pp	Total	+/−
Spanish Socialist Workers' Party (PSOE)	8,178	42.00	+6.35	1	+1
People's Party (PP)^{1}	7,671	39.40	−6.54	0	−1
Democratic and Social Centre (CDS)	1,644	8.44	−2.78	0	±0
Spanish Nationalist Party of Melilla (PNEM)	1,374	7.06	New	0	±0
Communist Party of the Peoples of Spain (PCPE)	204	1.05	New	0	±0
Workers' Socialist Party (PST)	131	0.67	New	0	±0
Blank ballots	270	1.39	−0.07		
Total	19,472			1	±0
Valid votes	19,472	98.72	−0.16		
Invalid votes	253	1.28	+0.16		
Votes cast / turnout	19,725	57.95	−2.03		
Abstentions	14,314	42.05	+2.03		
Registered voters	34,039				
Sources
Footnotes: ^{1} People's Party results are compared to People's Coalition totals in the 1986 election.
