= Communists' Unity Board =

Communists' Unity Board Mesa para la Unidad de los Comunistas
- Secretary-General: Santiago Carrillo
- Founded: 1986
- Dissolved: 1986
- Headquarters: Madrid
- Ideology: Eurocommunism; Revolutionary Marxism
- Political position: Left-wing

The Communists' Unity Board (in Spanish: Mesa para la Unidad de los Comunistas) was an electoral coalition in Spain formed to contest the 1986 general election, composed primarily by Santiago Carrillo's split party, the Workers' Party of Spain–Communist Unity.
