= Republican Popular Unity =

Republican Popular Unity Unidad Popular Republicana
- Founded: 1986
- Dissolved: 1987
- Ideology: Marxism-leninism; Republicanism
- Political position: Far-left

Republican Popular Unity (Spanish: Unidad Popular Republicana, UPR) was a Spanish electoral candidacy formed to contest the 1986 general election by the Communist Party of Spain (Marxist–Leninist) (PCE (m–l)) and Republican Convention of the Peoples of Spain (CRPE).
