= Opinion polling for the 2011 Spanish general election =

In the run up to the 2011 Spanish general election, various organisations carried out opinion polling to gauge voting intention in Spain during the term of the 9th Cortes Generales. Results of such polls are displayed in this article. The date range for these opinion polls is from the previous general election, held on 9 March 2008, to the day the next election was held, on 20 November 2011.

Voting intention estimates refer mainly to a hypothetical Congress of Deputies election. Polls are listed in reverse chronological order, showing the most recent first and using the dates when the survey fieldwork was done, as opposed to the date of publication. Where the fieldwork dates are unknown, the date of publication is given instead. The highest percentage figure in each polling survey is displayed with its background shaded in the leading party's colour. If a tie ensues, this is applied to the figures with the highest percentages. The "Lead" columns on the right shows the percentage-point difference between the parties with the highest percentages in a poll.

== Electoral polling ==
=== Nationwide polling ===
==== Graphical summary ====
Local regression trend line of poll results from 9 March 2008 to 20 November 2011, with each line corresponding to a political party.

==== Voting intention estimates ====
The table below lists nationwide voting intention estimates. Refusals are generally excluded from the party vote percentages, while question wording and the treatment of "don't know" responses and those not intending to vote may vary between polling organisations. When available, seat projections determined by the polling organisations are displayed below (or in place of) the percentages in a smaller font; 176 seats were required for an absolute majority in the Congress of Deputies.

Color key:

Poll conducted after legal ban on opinion polls Exit poll

| Polling firm/Commissioner | Fieldwork date | Sample size | Turnout | PSOE | PP | IU–LV | CiU | PNV | UPyD | ERC | BNG | CC | Amaiur | Lead |
|---|---|---|---|---|---|---|---|---|---|---|---|---|---|---|
| 2011 general election | 20 Nov 2011 | —N/a | 68.9 | 28.8; 110 | 44.6; 186 | 6.9; 11 | 4.2; 16 | 1.3; 5 | 4.7; 5 | 1.1; 3 | 0.8; 2 | 0.6; 2 | 1.4; 7 | 15.8 |
| TNS Demoscopia/RTVE–FORTA | 20 Nov 2011 | 190,000 | ? | 30.0; 115/119 | 43.5; 181/185 | 6.7; 9/11 | 3.4; 13/15 | 1.2; 4/5 | 4.3; 3/4 | 1.1; 3 | 0.8; 2 | 0.6; 2/3 | 1.4; 6/7 | 13.5 |
| NC Report/La Razón | 20 Nov 2011 | 771 | 71.1 | 31.7; 112/116 | 45.5; 186/192 | 7.9; 11 | 3.3; 13 | 1.2; 4/5 | 2.4; 2 | 0.7; 2 | 1.0; 2 | 0.8; 2/3 | ? 4/5 | 13.8 |
| PP | 19 Nov 2011 | ? | ? | ? 117 | ? 191 | – | – | – | – | – | – | – | – | ? |
| Sigma Dos/The Times | 16 Nov 2011 | ? | ? | 28.0; 107 | 48.0; 200 | 6.7; 11 | 3.1; 12 | ? 6 | 3.8; 4 | ? 2 | ? 2 | ? 2 | ? 4 | 20.0 |
| Infortécnica | 13 Nov 2011 | ? | ? | ? 115/125 | ? 190/200 | – | – | – | – | – | ? 2 | – | – | ? |
| GESOP/El Periódico | 7–12 Nov 2011 | 2,070 | ? | 30.2; 115/118 | 46.2; 188/192 | 6.0; 8/10 | 3.2; 13/14 | 1.1; 4/5 | 4.4; 4 | 1.1; 2/3 | – | – | 1.1; 4/5 | 16.0 |
| Tábula V/La Gaceta | 7–11 Nov 2011 | 1,400 | 79 | 31.3; 121/123 | 45.2; 184/187 | 8.9; 9/10 | 3.2; 11/13 | 1.4; 4/6 | 3.2; 2/3 | 1.3; 2/3 | 0.8; 1/2 | 0.6; 1/2 | 1.6; 4/6 | 13.9 |
| NC Report/La Razón | 27 Oct–11 Nov 2011 | 5,750 | ? | 31.0; 115 | 45.9; 188 | 7.2; 11 | 3.3; 13 | 1.3; 5 | 2.8; 2 | 0.9; 2 | 1.0; 2 | 0.8; 3 | ? 5 | 14.9 |
| Opinión 2000/Cadena SER | 9–10 Nov 2011 | 1,000 | ? | 32.0 | 45.0 | 6.0 | 3.5 | 1.5 | 3.0 | 1.0 | – | – | 1.0 | 13.0 |
| Noxa/La Vanguardia | 7–10 Nov 2011 | 1,275 | >70 | 30.1; 116/120 | 44.7; 184/189 | 7.8; 8/10 | 3.3; 12/14 | 1.0; 4/5 | 4.6; 3/4 | 0.7; 2 | – | – | 0.6; 3/4 | 14.6 |
| Simple Lógica | 2–10 Nov 2011 | 1,009 | 73.7 | 31.2 | 46.1 | 5.5 | 3.5 | 0.6 | 3.7 | – | – | – | – | 14.9 |
| GAD3/COPE | 2–10 Nov 2011 | 1,395 | ? | 31.8; 115/118 | 45.4; 188/192 | 5.6; 8 | 3.3; 13 | 1.3; 5/6 | 3.4; 3 | 0.8; 1 | 0.8; 2 | 0.9; 3 | 1.4; 4/5 | 13.6 |
| Sigma Dos/El Mundo | 28 Oct–10 Nov 2011 | 3,000 | ? | 29.8; 112 | 47.6; 198 | 5.7; 7 | 3.8; 14 | 1.3; 5 | 3.0; 3 | 0.9; 2 | ? 2 | ? 2 | ? 3 | 17.8 |
| Sondaxe/La Voz de Galicia | 28 Oct–9 Nov 2011 | ? | ? | 31.6 | 47.1 | 5.3 | 3.6 | 0.7 | 2.3 | 0.8 | 0.7 | 0.2 | – | 15.5 |
| Celeste-Tel | 2–8 Nov 2011 | 1,100 | ? | 31.5; 118/120 | 44.7; 186/188 | 7.0; 9/10 | 3.3; 12/13 | 1.3; 5 | 2.6; 2 | 0.9; 2 | 1.2; 2 | 0.9; 3 | ? 4/5 | 13.2 |
| Metroscopia/El País | 18 Oct–8 Nov 2011 | 9,675 | 70 | 30.9; 110/113 | 45.4; 192/196 | 8.8; 11 | 3.3; 14 | 1.2; 5 | 4.2; 2 | 0.9; 3 | 0.7; 2 | 0.3; 2 | 0.6; 4/5 | 14.5 |
| TNS Demoscopia/CEMOP | 2–7 Nov 2011 | 1,505 | 74.3 | 28.7 | 47.7 | 7.6 | 3.4 | 1.1 | 4.2 | 1.2 | – | – | – | 19.0 |
| Sigma Dos/El Mundo | 3–6 Nov 2011 | ? | ? | 30.1; 114 | 48.2; 198 | 5.4; 6 | 3.6; 13 | 1.3; 5 | 3.0; 3 | 0.9; 2 | ? 2 | ? 2 | ? 3 | 18.1 |
| Ipsos/La Nueva España | 1–6 Nov 2011 | 3,935 | ? | 31.8; 123/128 | 44.5; 184/190 | 6.1 ? | 3.4 ? | 1.0 ? | 4.1 ? | 1.0 ? | 0.7 ? | 0.4 ? | 0.9 ? | 12.7 |
| InvyMark/laSexta | 31 Oct–4 Nov 2011 | ? | ? | 34.4 | 46.5 | 4.6 | – | – | – | – | – | – | – | 12.1 |
| PP | 3 Nov 2011 | ? | ? | ? 116 | ? 189 | – | – | ? 4/5 | ? 3 | – | – | – | – | ? |
| Sigma Dos/El Mundo | 31 Oct–3 Nov 2011 | 3,000 | ? | 30.6; 117 | 47.6; 194 | 5.3; 6 | 3.5; 13 | 1.3; 5 | 3.0; 3 | 0.9; 2 | ? 2 | ? 3 | ? 3 | 17.0 |
| DYM/ABC | 24 Oct–3 Nov 2011 | 7,612 | ? | 34.2; 123/126 | 45.5; 187/188 | 5.4; 6/7 | 3.6; 12/14 | 1.2; 4 | 2.8; 2/3 | 1.3; 2 | 0.6; 1 | 0.7; 2/3 | 1.3; 5/6 | 11.3 |
| NC Report/La Razón | 24 Oct–3 Nov 2011 | 5,752 | ? | 31.3; 119 | 46.0; 185 | ? 11 | ? 13 | ? 6 | ? 2 | ? 1 | ? 2 | ? 3 | ? 4 | 14.7 |
| Sigma Dos/El Mundo | 18–31 Oct 2011 | 3,000 | ? | 30.7; 117 | 47.4; 193 | 5.4; 6 | 3.5; 13 | 1.2; 5 | 3.1; 3 | 0.9; 2 | ? 2 | ? 3 | ? 4 | 16.7 |
| GAD3/COPE | 17–31 Oct 2011 | 1,200 | 71 | 32.7; 120/127 | 45.2; 182/189 | 5.1; 4/7 | 3.3; 11/14 | 1.2; 4/6 | 3.4; 2/3 | 0.8; 1 | 0.8; 2 | 0.9; 3 | 1.4; 3/5 | 12.5 |
| NC Report/La Razón | 28 Oct 2011 | 1,000 | 69.1 | 31.4; 118/120 | 45.9; 184/187 | 7.4; 10/11 | 2.9; 12 | 1.1; 5 | 2.8; 2/3 | 0.8; 1 | 1.3; 3 | 0.9; 3 | ? 5 | 14.5 |
| Celeste-Tel | 24–28 Oct 2011 | 1,100 | ? | 32.3; 120/121 | 46.1; 186/188 | 6.8; 8/9 | 3.3; 12/13 | 1.3; 5 | 2.8; 2 | 0.9; 2 | 1.2; 3 | 0.9; 3 | ? 4/5 | 13.8 |
| Metroscopia/El País | 24–27 Oct 2011 | 1,500 | 70 | 30.3 | 45.3 | 6.0 | – | – | 4.2 | – | – | – | – | 15.0 |
| Sigma Dos/El Mundo | 27 Sep–27 Oct 2011 | 7,400 | ? | 31.0; 119 | 47.4; 191 | 5.3; 6 | 3.5; 13 | 1.1; 5 | 3.1; 3 | 0.9; 2 | ? 2 | ? 3 | ? 4 | 16.4 |
| Sigma Dos/El Mundo | 11–24 Oct 2011 | 3,000 | ? | 31.3; 121 | 47.5; 191 | 5.3; 6 | 3.3; 13 | 1.1; 5 | 3.1; 3 | 0.8; 1 | ? 2 | ? 2 | ? 4 | 16.2 |
| CIS | 6–23 Oct 2011 | 17,236 | ? | 29.9; 116/121 | 46.6; 190/195 | 6.2; 8 | 3.3; 13 | 1.2; 3 | 2.9; 3 | 1.2; 3 | 0.8; 2 | 0.6; 2 | 1.1; 3 | 16.7 |
| NC Report/La Razón | 18–22 Oct 2011 | 1,000 | 68.6 | 31.2; 116/118 | 46.2; 186/189 | 7.2; 10/11 | 3.1; 13 | 1.0; 4 | 2.8; 2/3 | 0.7; 1 | 1.2; 3 | 0.9; 3 | ? 5/6 | 15.0 |
| InvyMark/laSexta | 18–21 Oct 2011 | ? | ? | 35.1 | 45.4 | 4.2 | – | – | – | – | – | – | – | 10.3 |
| Obradoiro de Socioloxía/Público | 17–20 Oct 2011 | 1,800 | ? | 33.1 | 44.7 | 6.7 | 2.7 | 1.4 | 2.6 | 1.2 | 0.8 | – | 1.3 | 11.6 |
| Sigma Dos/El Mundo | 7–20 Oct 2011 | 3,000 | 73.3 | 30.7; 119 | 47.8; 194 | 5.4; 6 | 3.4; 13 | 1.1; 6 | 3.2; 3 | 0.9; 2 | ? 2 | ? 2 | ? 2 | 17.1 |
| Sigma Dos/El Mundo | 3–17 Oct 2011 | 3,300 | ? | 30.7; 118 | 47.9; 195 | 5.4; 6 | 3.4; 13 | 1.2; 6 | 2.9; 3 | 1.0; 2 | ? 2 | ? 2 | ? 3 | 17.2 |
| Intercampo/GETS | 15 Sep–17 Oct 2011 | 1,724 | Medium | 32.2 | 46.3 | 4.9 | 2.8 | 1.0 | 4.4 | 1.1 | – | – | – | 14.1 |
| Intercampo/GETS | 15 Sep–17 Oct 2011 | 1,724 | High | 31.0– 33.0 | 45.0– 47.0 | 4.5– 5.5 | 2.6– 3.1 | 0.9– 1.1 | 4.0– 5.0 | 0.8– 1.2 | – | – | – | 14.0 |
| Intercampo/GETS | 15 Sep–17 Oct 2011 | 1,724 | Low | 30.0– 32.0 | 47.0– 49.0 | 4.0– 5.0 | 2.7– 3.1 | 0.8– 1.2 | 4.0– 5.0 | 0.7– 1.0 | – | – | – | 17.0 |
| NC Report/La Razón | 14 Oct 2011 | ? | 68.3 | 30.9; 115/117 | 46.4; 187/190 | 7.0; 10/11 | 3.3; 13/14 | 1.2; 4/5 | 2.9; 2/3 | 0.7; 1/2 | 1.2; 2/3 | 0.9; 3/4 | ? 4/5 | 15.5 |
| Sigma Dos/El Mundo | 11–13 Oct 2011 | 900 | ? | 30.8; 117 | 48.0; 196 | 5.3; 6 | 3.4; 13 | 1.2; 6 | 3.0; 3 | 1.0; 2 | ? 2 | ? 2 | ? 3 | 17.2 |
| Metroscopia/El País | 11–13 Oct 2011 | 1,500 | 70 | 29.7; 115/120 | 45.5; 185/190 | 7.6 ? | – | – | 4.5 ? | – | – | – | – | 15.8 |
| Simple Lógica | 3–10 Oct 2011 | ? | ? | 31.8 | 46.7 | 5.1 | 2.8 | 1.3 | 4.0 | – | – | – | – | 14.9 |
| Sigma Dos/El Mundo | 27 Sep–10 Oct 2011 | 3,600 | ? | 31.4; 121 | 47.6; 193 | 5.2; 6 | 3.3; 13 | 1.3; 6 | 3.0; 3 | 1.0; 2 | ? 2 | ? 2 | ? 2 | 16.2 |
| Celeste-Tel/Terra | 3–8 Oct 2011 | 1,357 | 69.1 | 32.7; 120/122 | 45.5; 185/187 | 6.8; 9/10 | 3.3; 12/13 | 1.4; 5/6 | 3.0; 2 | 0.8; 1 | 1.3; 3 | 0.9; 3 | 1.3; 4 | 12.8 |
| InvyMark/laSexta | 3–7 Oct 2011 | ? | ? | 35.1 | 46.1 | 4.6 | 3.4 | – | – | – | – | – | – | 11.0 |
| Sigma Dos/El Mundo | 27 Sep–6 Oct 2011 | 3,000 | ? | 31.6; 122 | 47.8; 193 | 5.2; 6 | 3.2; 12 | 1.2; 5 | 2.9; 3 | 1.0; 2 | ? 2 | ? 2 | ? 3 | 16.2 |
| NC Report/La Razón | 21 Sep–6 Oct 2011 | 6,100 | ? | 30.6; 113/115 | 45.9; 183/185 | 7.2; 11/12 | 3.6; 14/15 | 1.1; 4/5 | 2.9; 2/3 | 0.8; 1/2 | 1.1; 2/3 | 0.9; 3/4 | ? 5 | 15.3 |
| Noxa/La Vanguardia | 28 Sep–4 Oct 2011 | 1,272 | ? | 32.9; 115/122 | 45.9; 186/192 | 4.7; 4 | 3.2; 11/12 | 0.9; 5/7 | 3.6; 2/4 | 0.5; 1/2 | – | – | 0.8; 4 | 13.0 |
| CEMOP | 26 Sep–4 Oct 2011 | 800 | 76 | 32.4 | 46.8 | 6.3 | 3.6 | 1.4 | 3.1 | 1.3 | – | – | – | 14.4 |
| Sigma Dos/El Mundo | 27–30 Sep 2011 | 2,000 | ? | 31.8 | 47.4 | 5.0 | 3.2 | 1.2 | 3.1 | 0.9 | – | – | – | 15.6 |
| Celeste-Tel | 26–30 Sep 2011 | 1,100 | ? | 32.1; 120 | 45.1; 183 | 7.0; 11 | 3.5; 13 | 1.2; 5 | 2.9; 2 | 0.8; 1 | 1.3; 3 | 1.0; 2 | – | 13.0 |
| PP | 29 Sep 2011 | ? | ? | ? 115 | ? 189 | ? 8 | ? 14 | ? 6 | ? 3 | ? 2 | ? 2 | ? 2 | ? 4 | ? |
| NC Report/La Razón | 21–28 Sep 2011 | 1,000 | 70.0 | 30.6; 116/118 | 46.1; 183/185 | 6.8; 10/12 | 3.6; 13/15 | 1.1; 5/6 | 3.0; 2/3 | 0.8; 1/2 | 1.0; 2/3 | 0.9; 3/4 | ? 5/6 | 15.5 |
| Celeste-Tel | 19–23 Sep 2011 | 1,100 | ? | 31.3; 121 | 44.0; 179 | 7.4; 11 | 3.6; 14 | 1.1; 4 | 2.9; 3 | 0.8; 1 | 1.4; 3 | 1.0; 2 | – | 12.7 |
| InvyMark/laSexta | 19–23 Sep 2011 | ? | ? | 35.3 | 45.9 | 4.5 | 3.4 | – | – | – | – | – | – | 10.6 |
| GESOP/El Periódico | 19–22 Sep 2011 | 1,000 | ? | 31.4; 121/125 | 46.1; 185/189 | 4.7; 4/6 | 3.7; 14/15 | 1.0; 4/5 | 5.0; 4/6 | 1.0; 1/2 | – | – | – | 14.7 |
| Celeste-Tel | 12–16 Sep 2011 | 1,100 | ? | 31.5; 128 | 44.2; 176 | 6.9; 9 | 3.8; 14 | 1.2; 5 | 2.9; 3 | 0.7; 1 | 1.2; 3 | 1.0; 2 | – | 12.7 |
| InvyMark/laSexta | 5–9 Sep 2011 | ? | ? | 35.5 | 45.8 | – | – | – | – | – | – | – | – | 10.3 |
| Opinión 2000/Cadena SER | 7–8 Sep 2011 | 1,000 | ? | 32.0 | 45.0 | 6.5 | 4.0 | 1.5 | 2.0 | 1.5 | – | – | – | 13.0 |
| Metroscopia/El País | 7–8 Sep 2011 | 1,002 | 70 | 30.7 | 44.8 | 6.2 | 3.3 | – | 4.4 | – | – | – | – | 14.1 |
| Simple Lógica | 1–8 Sep 2011 | 1,022 | ? | 32.9 | 46.7 | 5.2 | 2.5 | 0.9 | 3.8 | – | – | – | – | 13.8 |
| GAD3/COPE | 5–6 Sep 2011 | 504 | ? | 31.1; 128 | 45.1; 179 | 6.1; 8 | 3.4; 13 | 1.1; 6 | 3.9; 4 | 0.7; 1 | 0.8; 2 | 0.3; 2 | – | 14.0 |
| Sigma Dos/El Mundo | 29 Aug–1 Sep 2011 | 1,000 | ? | 32.3 | 47.1 | 5.0 | 3.2 | 1.2 | 3.5 | 0.6 | – | – | – | 14.8 |
| NC Report/La Razón | 28 Aug 2011 | ? | 69.5 | 30.8; 117/119 | 46.5; 182/185 | 6.2; 6/7 | 3.8; 14/16 | 1.2; 5/6 | 3.2; 3/4 | 0.7; 1/2 | 1.0; 2/3 | 0.6; 1/2 | ? 4 | 15.7 |
| Simple Lógica | 2–10 Aug 2011 | 1,014 | ? | 31.5 | 44.8 | 4.3 | 3.0 | 1.0 | 4.8 | – | – | – | – | 13.3 |
| DYM/ABC | 2–3 Aug 2011 | 1,076 | ? | 35.0 | 47.6 | 4.7 | 3.5 | 1.3 | 1.8 | 0.5 | – | – | 2.0 | 12.6 |
| NC Report/La Razón | 29–30 Jul 2011 | 1,000 | 69.3 | 30.9; 118/121 | 46.9; 183/186 | 6.6; 7/8 | 3.8; 12/14 | 1.2; 5/6 | 3.2; 4 | 0.9; 2 | 1.0; 3 | 0.6; 1 | ? 4 | 16.0 |
| Metroscopia/El País | 27–28 Jul 2011 | 1,203 | 70 | 30.8 | 44.8 | 6.6 | – | – | 3.8 | – | – | – | – | 14.0 |
| Simple Lógica | 4–12 Jul 2011 | ? | ? | 30.8 | 46.3 | 5.1 | 2.3 | 0.8 | 4.3 | – | – | – | – | 15.5 |
| CIS | 4–11 Jul 2011 | 2,475 | ? | 36.0 | 43.1 | 5.1 | 3.1 | 1.0 | 3.0 | 1.1 | 0.5 | 0.5 | – | 7.1 |
| Ipsos | 27 Jun–8 Jul 2011 | ? | ? | 36.0 | 44.2 | 4.4 | 2.8 | 1.4 | 2.4 | 0.6 | 1.1 | – | 1.2 | 8.2 |
| Celeste-Tel | 1–7 Jul 2011 | 1,100 | ? | 34.3; 139 | 44.2; 170 | 5.9; 6 | 3.9; 14 | 1.2; 5 | 3.2; 3 | 0.6; 1 | 1.1; 3 | 1.0; 2 | – | 9.9 |
| GAD/COPE | 1–5 Jul 2011 | 504 | ? | 30.9; 120 | 46.4; 187 | 6.1; 10 | 3.5; 15 | 1.1; 6 | 3.4; 3 | 0.7; 1 | 0.8; 2 | 0.3; 2 | – | 15.5 |
| Metroscopia/El País | 29–30 Jun 2011 | 1,001 | 70 | 30.4 | 44.7 | 6.4 | – | – | 3.2 | – | – | – | – | 14.3 |
| NC Report/La Razón | 26–30 Jun 2011 | 1,000 | 68.5 | 31.0; 118/122 | 47.1; 182/185 | 7.0; 7/8 | 3.7; 12/13 | 1.1; 5 | 3.3; 4/5 | 0.8; 2 | 1.0; 3 | 0.5; 1 | ? 4 | 16.1 |
| Opinión 2000/Cadena SER | 20–21 Jun 2011 | 1,000 | ? | 38.0 | 47.0 | 3.5 | 3.0 | 1.0 | 1.5 | 2.0 | – | – | – | 9.0 |
| GAD/COPE | 3–7 Jun 2011 | 501 | ? | 30.7; 119 | 46.6; 189 | 6.2; 10 | 3.6; 16 | 1.3; 7 | 3.2; 3 | 0.7; 1 | 0.8; 2 | 0.3; 2 | – | 15.9 |
| Celeste-Tel | 1–7 Jun 2011 | 1,100 | ? | 32.8; 135 | 45.5; 173 | 6.5; 6 | 3.9; 15 | 1.1; 5 | 3.1; 3 | 0.6; 1 | 1.1; 3 | 0.9; 1 | – | 12.7 |
| Simple Lógica | 1–6 Jun 2011 | 1,000 | ? | 29.4 | 46.3 | 6.4 | 2.8 | 1.3 | 5.3 | – | – | – | – | 16.9 |
| Sigma Dos/El Mundo | 1–2 Jun 2011 | 1,000 | ? | 32.1 | 45.9 | 5.8 | 3.5 | 1.0 | 3.6 | 1.1 | – | – | – | 13.8 |
| Metroscopia/El País | 1–2 Jun 2011 | 1,001 | 70 | 31.0 | 44.8 | 6.2 | 3.2 | – | 2.5 | – | – | – | – | 13.8 |
| NC Report/La Razón | 29 May–2 Jun 2011 | 1,000 | 68.6 | 31.5; 120/123 | 47.2; 186/187 | 6.4; 7/8 | 3.9; 13/14 | 1.2; 5/6 | 3.2; 4/5 | 0.7; 2 | 0.9; 3 | 0.7; 2 | – | 15.7 |
| GESOP/El Periódico | 30 May–1 Jun 2011 | 1,000 | ? | 35.3; 133/137 | 44.0; 176/180 | 5.8; 7/9 | 3.0; 12/13 | 1.2; 5/6 | 4.1; 4/5 | 0.7; 1 | – | – | – | 8.7 |
| 2011 local elections | 22 May 2011 | —N/a | 66.2 | 27.8 | 37.5 | 7.4 | 3.5 | 1.4 | 2.1 | 1.2 | 1.2 | 0.9 | 1.4 | 9.7 |
| Simple Lógica | 3–13 May 2011 | 1,016 | ? | 30.6 | 47.0 | 6.4 | 3.3 | 1.1 | 3.9 | – | – | – | – | 16.4 |
| Celeste-Tel | 2–6 May 2011 | 1,100 | ? | 32.0; 133 | 46.2; 173 | 6.8; 6 | 4.0; 14 | 1.3; 5 | 3.1; 4 | 0.6; 2 | 1.2; 3 | 0.8; 1 | – | 14.2 |
| Metroscopia/El País | 27–28 Apr 2011 | 1,200 | 70 | 31.7 | 44.3 | – | – | – | – | – | – | – | – | 12.6 |
| Ikerfel/Vocento | 4–22 Apr 2011 | 45,635 | ? | 35.5 | 44.5 | 6.0 | 3.9 | 1.4 | 2.5 | 0.9 | 0.9 | 0.7 | – | 9.0 |
| NC Report/La Razón | 18–20 Apr 2011 | 1,000 | ? | 31.8; 122/125 | 46.4; 186/187 | 6.6; 7/9 | 3.9; 13/14 | 1.3; 7 | 3.4; 3/4 | 0.6; 1/2 | 0.8; 2 | 0.6; 2 | – | 14.6 |
| Obradoiro de Socioloxía/Público | 11–19 Apr 2011 | 2,005 | ? | 37.8 | 40.1 | 7.2 | 3.9 | 1.3 | 2.3 | 0.6 | 1.1 | – | – | 2.3 |
| TNS Demoscopia/Antena 3 | 7–12 Apr 2011 | 3,000 | 72.0 | 30.5 | 45.5 | – | – | – | – | – | – | – | – | 15.0 |
| InvyMark/laSexta | 4–8 Apr 2011 | ? | ? | 32.7 | 46.3 | – | – | – | – | – | – | – | – | 13.6 |
| CIS | 1–8 Apr 2011 | 2,463 | ? | 33.4 | 43.8 | 5.2 | 3.5 | 1.3 | 3.5 | 1.3 | 0.9 | 0.5 | – | 10.4 |
| Opinión 2000/Cadena SER | 6–7 Apr 2011 | 1,000 | ? | 35.0 | 47.0 | 4.3 | 3.5 | 0.7 | 1.5 | 2.0 | – | – | – | 12.0 |
| Sigma Dos/El Mundo | 5–7 Apr 2011 | 1,000 | ? | 37.7 | 45.2 | 4.1 | 3.2 | 1.1 | 1.5 | 0.9 | – | – | – | 7.5 |
| Celeste-Tel | 1–7 Apr 2011 | 1,100 | ? | 32.3; 136 | 46.1; 172 | 6.6; 7 | 4.1; 14 | 1.2; 6 | 3.0; 4 | 0.6; 2 | 1.0; 3 | 0.8; 1 | – | 13.8 |
| GAD/COPE | 1–5 Apr 2011 | 500 | ? | 33.7; 128 | 45.9; 181 | 6.1; 9 | 3.7; 15 | 1.3; 7 | 2.9; 3 | 0.8; 2 | 0.8; 2 | 0.2; 1 | – | 12.2 |
| NC Report/La Razón | 2 Apr 2011 | 1,000 | 67.6 | 31.6; 123/124 | 46.8; 185/187 | 6.6; 8/10 | 3.9; 13/14 | 1.3; 7 | 3.4; 3/4 | 0.6; 1 | 0.8; 2 | 0.6; 1 | – | 15.2 |
| Metroscopia/El País | 30–31 Mar 2011 | 1,004 | 70 | 28.3 | 44.1 | – | – | – | – | – | – | – | – | 15.8 |
| InvyMark/laSexta | 21–25 Mar 2011 | ? | ? | 32.5 | 46.4 | – | – | – | – | – | – | – | – | 13.9 |
| Obradoiro de Socioloxía/Público | 21–24 Mar 2011 | 1,201 | ? | 30.2 | 43.5 | 8.1 | 3.7 | 1.7 | 4.8 | 0.6 | 1.3 | – | – | 13.3 |
| TNS Demoscopia/Antena 3 | 21–22 Mar 2011 | 1,000 | 71.3 | 29.6 | 46.0 | – | – | – | – | – | – | – | – | 16.4 |
| Sigma Dos/El Mundo | 7–9 Mar 2011 | 1,000 | ? | 31.4 | 47.9 | 6.2 | 3.2 | 1.0 | 2.4 | 1.0 | – | – | – | 16.5 |
| GAD/COPE | 7–9 Mar 2011 | 502 | ? | 31.1; 121 | 46.1; 185 | 6.5; 11 | 3.9; 16 | 1.3; 7 | 3.8; 4 | 0.8; 2 | 0.8; 2 | 0.2; 1 | – | 15.0 |
| Celeste-Tel | 1–7 Mar 2011 | 1,100 | ? | 32.9; 138 | 45.9; 170 | 6.5; 8 | 3.9; 14 | 1.2; 6 | 3.2; 4 | 0.7; 2 | 1.0; 3 | 0.7; 1 | – | 13.0 |
| Metroscopia/El País | 2–3 Mar 2011 | 1,004 | 70 | 28.1 | 44.0 | – | – | – | – | – | – | – | – | 15.9 |
| JM&A | 25 Feb 2011 | ? | 68.9 | 28.9 | 47.5 | 6.3 | 4.4 | 1.1 | 4.2 | 1.0 | 0.9 | 0.3 | – | 22.7 |
| Obradoiro de Socioloxía/Público | 21–25 Feb 2011 | 1,982 | ? | 30.7 | 44.4 | 7.1 | 3.8 | 1.3 | 4.3 | 0.9 | 1.3 | – | – | 13.7 |
| NC Report/La Razón | 17–23 Feb 2011 | 1,000 | 68.5 | 32.9; 123/125 | 46.0; 184/187 | 6.3; 8/10 | 3.8; 13/14 | 1.3; 7 | 3.3; 3/4 | 0.6; 1 | 0.8; 2 | 0.6; 1 | – | 13.1 |
| TNS Demoscopia/Antena 3 | 21–22 Feb 2011 | ? | 68.5 | 31.1 | 45.8 | 7.1 | 3.4 | 1.1 | 3.5 | 0.9 | 0.8 | – | – | 14.7 |
| InvyMark/laSexta | 7–11 Feb 2011 | ? | ? | 32.3 | 46.1 | – | – | – | – | – | – | – | – | 13.8 |
| GAD/COPE | 7–8 Feb 2011 | 501 | ? | 32.1; 125 | 46.2; 185 | 6.3; 9 | 3.9; 16 | 1.3; 7 | 2.7; 2 | 0.8; 2 | ? 2 | ? 1 | – | 14.1 |
| Celeste-Tel | 1–7 Feb 2011 | 1,100 | ? | 34.7; 141 | 45.0; 171 | 6.4; 6 | 4.0; 14 | 1.2; 6 | 3.3; 4 | 0.5; 2 | 1.0; 3 | 0.7; 1 | – | 10.3 |
| Sigma Dos/El Mundo | 2–3 Feb 2011 | 1,000 | ? | 31.3 | 47.4 | 8.1 | 2.9 | 1.1 | 2.2 | 0.9 | – | – | – | 16.1 |
| Metroscopia/El País | 2–3 Feb 2011 | 1,005 | 70 | 28.4 | 43.3 | – | – | – | – | – | – | – | – | 14.9 |
| Opina/Cadena SER | 1–2 Feb 2011 | 1,000 | ? | 34.0 | 44.0 | 5.5 | 3.0 | 1.2 | 2.0 | 1.1 | – | – | – | 10.0 |
| InvyMark/laSexta | 24–28 Jan 2011 | ? | ? | 32.4 | 46.3 | – | – | – | – | – | – | – | – | 13.9 |
| Obradoiro de Socioloxía/Público | 17–21 Jan 2011 | 2,082 | ? | 30.9 | 44.0 | 7.5 | 4.8 | 1.5 | 2.9 | 0.5 | 0.8 | – | – | 13.1 |
| TNS Demoscopia/Antena 3 | 17–18 Jan 2011 | ? | 67.7 | 30.2 | 47.0 | 7.6 | 3.3 | 1.1 | 2.8 | 1.0 | 0.6 | – | – | 16.8 |
| CIS | 7–16 Jan 2011 | 2,478 | ? | 34.0 | 44.1 | 5.7 | 3.9 | 1.2 | 2.9 | 0.8 | 0.9 | 0.5 | – | 10.1 |
| Opina/Cadena SER | 12–13 Jan 2011 | 1,000 | ? | 34.0 | 45.0 | 6.0 | 3.5 | 1.0 | 3.4 | 1.0 | – | – | – | 11.0 |
| GAD/COPE | 10–11 Jan 2011 | 500 | ? | 31.3; 120 | 46.5; 189 | 6.2; 9 | 3.6; 15 | 1.4; 7 | 3.7; 3 | 0.8; 2 | 0.9; 2 | 0.4; 2 | – | 15.2 |
| Celeste-Tel | 3–10 Jan 2011 | 1,100 | ? | 34.4; 139 | 45.2; 172 | 6.6; 7 | 4.0; 14 | 1.3; 6 | 3.5; 4 | 0.6; 2 | 1.0; 3 | 0.7; 1 | – | 10.8 |
| Metroscopia/El País | 3–4 Jan 2011 | 1,023 | 70 | 28.6 | 43.1 | – | – | – | – | – | – | – | – | 14.5 |
| NC Report/La Razón | 28–30 Dec 2010 | 1,000 | 67.0 | 30.4; 121/123 | 48.0; 186/189 | 7.4; 10/12 | 4.2; 13/14 | 1.2; 7 | 3.7; 3/4 | 0.6; 1 | 0.9; 2 | 0.4; 1 | – | 17.6 |
| DYM/ABC | 20–30 Dec 2010 | 1,058 | ? | 30.8 | 49.3 | 7.5 | 4.1 | 1.3 | 1.8 | 1.1 | – | – | – | 18.5 |
| Sigma Dos/El Mundo | 23–28 Dec 2010 | 1,000 | ? | 30.3 | 48.7 | 6.4 | 3.8 | 1.2 | 1.5 | 0.9 | – | – | – | 18.4 |
| GESOP/El Periódico | 15–17 Dec 2010 | 1,000 | ? | 31.0; 120/124 | 44.5; 178/182 | 7.4; 13/15 | 4.0; 15/16 | 1.1; 5/6 | 4.2; 4/5 | 1.0; 1/2 | – | – | – | 13.5 |
| InvyMark/laSexta | 13–17 Dec 2010 | ? | ? | 33.4 | 45.5 | – | – | – | – | – | – | – | – | 12.1 |
| JM&A | 16 Dec 2010 | ? | 65.0 | 24.3 | 47.0 | 8.0 | 4.0 | – | 6.0 | – | – | – | – | 22.7 |
| Obradoiro de Socioloxía/Público | 13–16 Dec 2010 | 1,600 | ? | 30.0 | 43.2 | 7.5 | 4.5 | 1.6 | 4.5 | 0.9 | 1.0 | – | – | 13.2 |
| TNS Demoscopia/Antena 3 | 13–14 Dec 2010 | ? | 70.3 | 30.5 | 46.1 | 7.4 | 3.6 | 1.0 | 3.3 | 0.9 | 0.7 | – | – | 15.6 |
| GAD/COPE | 13–14 Dec 2010 | 500 | ? | 31.7; 123 | 46.2; 189 | 5.9; 8 | 3.6; 15 | 1.4; 7 | 3.1; 2 | 0.7; 1 | 0.9; 2 | 0.4; 2 | – | 14.5 |
| Celeste-Tel | 1–9 Dec 2010 | 1,100 | ? | 34.7; 138 | 44.8; 173 | 6.7; 7 | 4.1; 14 | 1.3; 6 | 3.5; 4 | 0.6; 2 | 1.1; 3 | 0.7; 1 | – | 10.1 |
| NC Report/La Razón | 6–7 Dec 2010 | 1,000 | 67.6 | 30.6; 124/125 | 47.6; 186/188 | 7.6; 10/14 | 4.3; 14/15 | 1.2; 7 | 3.7; 3/4 | 0.9; 1 | 0.9; 2 | 0.4; 1 | – | 17.0 |
| InvyMark/laSexta | 29 Nov–3 Dec 2010 | ? | ? | 33.3 | 45.6 | – | – | – | – | – | – | – | – | 12.3 |
| Metroscopia/El País | 1–2 Dec 2010 | 1,000 | 75.3 | 24.3 | 43.1 | 7.6 | – | – | 4.3 | – | – | – | – | 18.8 |
| NC Report/La Razón | 15–17 Nov 2010 | 1,000 | 69.0 | 32.8; 128/130 | 46.3; 179/182 | 7.2; 10/11 | 4.2; 14/15 | 1.2; 7 | 3.4; 3/4 | 0.9; 1/2 | 0.9; 2 | 0.4; 1 | – | 13.5 |
| JM&A | 16 Nov 2010 | ? | 69.8 | 32.6 | 41.3 | 6.6 | 3.7 | – | 5.7 | – | – | – | – | 8.7 |
| TNS Demoscopia/Antena 3 | 15–16 Nov 2010 | ? | 66.5 | 32.1 | 45.1 | 7.1 | 3.5 | 0.9 | 3.2 | 1.0 | 0.8 | – | – | 13.0 |
| Obradoiro de Socioloxía/Público | 2–11 Nov 2010 | 2,402 | ? | 33.2 | 41.2 | 6.5 | 4.0 | 1.0 | 4.5 | 0.8 | 1.3 | – | – | 8.0 |
| GAD/COPE | 8–10 Nov 2010 | 503 | ? | 35.1; 135 | 44.7; 180 | 5.2; 6 | 3.4; 13 | 1.3; 7 | 2.9; 2 | 0.9; 2 | 0.9; 2 | 0.5; 2 | – | 9.6 |
| Celeste-Tel | 2–8 Nov 2010 | 1,100 | ? | 34.8; 138 | 44.4; 172 | 6.9; 8 | 4.0; 14 | 1.2; 6 | 3.6; 4 | 0.6; 2 | 1.0; 3 | 0.6; 1 | – | 9.6 |
| Metroscopia/El País | 2–4 Nov 2010 | 1,000 | 75.3 | 33.8 | 42.9 | – | – | – | – | – | – | – | – | 9.1 |
| Opina/Cadena SER | 28–29 Oct 2010 | 1,000 | ? | 37.5 | 45.0 | 5.5 | 3.5 | 1.0 | 3.4 | 1.0 | – | – | – | 7.5 |
| Noxa/La Vanguardia | 25–28 Oct 2010 | 1,000 | ? | 33.0; 133 | 42.8; 175 | 6.6; 7 | 4.2; 15 | 1.9; 9 | 5.1; 5 | 0.6; 2 | – | – | – | 9.8 |
| TNS Demoscopia/Antena 3 | 21 Oct 2010 | ? | 70.0 | 34.2 | 44.3 | – | – | – | – | – | – | – | – | 10.1 |
| Sigma Dos/El Mundo | 20–21 Oct 2010 | 1,000 | ? | 33.8 | 46.4 | 6.1 | 3.3 | 1.3 | 1.9 | 1.0 | – | – | – | 12.6 |
| Intercampo/GETS | 15 Sep–17 Oct 2010 | 1,734 | High | 32.4 | 47.6 | 6.8 | 4.4 | 1.3 | 2.7 | 0.5 | – | – | – | 15.2 |
| Intercampo/GETS | 15 Sep–17 Oct 2010 | 1,734 | Low | 33.7 | 46.9 | 7.1 | 4.1 | 1.2 | 2.9 | 0.5 | – | – | – | 13.2 |
| CIS | 4–14 Oct 2010 | 2,475 | ? | 34.3 | 42.2 | 6.2 | 3.5 | 1.2 | 4.1 | 0.8 | 0.8 | 0.7 | – | 7.9 |
| JM&A | 13 Oct 2010 | ? | 68.2 | 29.2 | 45.9 | 6.8 | 3.0 | – | 5.4 | – | – | – | – | 16.7 |
| GAD/COPE | 8–13 Oct 2010 | 501 | ? | 33.9; 130 | 43.6; 178 | 6.3; 10 | 3.5; 14 | 1.3; 7 | 3.6; 3 | 1.1; 3 | 0.9; 2 | 0.5; 2 | – | 9.7 |
| Opina/Cadena SER | 7–8 Oct 2010 | 1,000 | ? | 34.0 | 46.5 | 6.0 | 4.0 | 2.0 | 3.0 | 0.6 | – | – | – | 12.5 |
| NC Report/La Razón | 4–7 Oct 2010 | 1,000 | 69.3 | 32.5; 131/134 | 46.3; 175/178 | 7.7; 12/15 | 4.1; 14/15 | 1.2; 6 | 3.6; 3/4 | 0.9; 1/2 | 0.9; 2 | 0.4; 1 | – | 13.8 |
| Celeste-Tel | 1–7 Oct 2010 | 1,100 | ? | 35.0; 140 | 44.0; 169 | 6.7; 9 | 3.8; 14 | 1.2; 6 | 3.5; 4 | 0.7; 2 | 1.0; 3 | 0.7; 1 | – | 9.0 |
| Obradoiro de Socioloxía/Público | 20 Sep–7 Oct 2010 | 2,329 | 65 | 29.4 | 42.8 | 6.9 | 4.8 | 0.9 | 5.4 | 1.1 | 1.4 | – | – | 13.4 |
| Metroscopia/El País | 30 Sep 2010 | 500 | 75.3 | 28.5 | 43.0 | – | – | – | – | – | – | – | – | 14.5 |
| TNS Demoscopia/Antena 3 | 20–21 Sep 2010 | ? | 68.0 | 31.1 | 44.6 | 7.8 | 3.6 | 1.0 | 3.9 | 1.0 | – | – | – | 13.5 |
| GAD/COPE | 13–15 Sep 2010 | 500 | ? | 34.9; 137 | 43.1; 174 | 6.1; 9 | 3.4; 13 | 1.3; 7 | 3.3; 2 | 1.2; 3 | 0.9; 2 | 0.5; 2 | – | 8.2 |
| NC Report/La Razón | 6–10 Sep 2010 | 1,000 | 69.6 | 35.4; 136/138 | 45.4; 173/175 | 6.2; 8/9 | 4.1; 13/14 | 1.2; 6 | 3.6; 3/4 | 0.9; 2 | 0.9; 2 | 0.5; 1 | – | 10.0 |
| Celeste-Tel | 1–7 Sep 2010 | 1,100 | ? | 35.2; 147 | 43.8; 165 | 6.4; 8 | 3.7; 13 | 1.2; 6 | 3.3; 3 | 0.7; 2 | 1.0; 3 | 0.7; 1 | – | 8.6 |
| Metroscopia/El País | 1–2 Sep 2010 | 500 | 75.3 | 32.9 | 41.8 | – | – | – | – | – | – | – | – | 8.9 |
| Opina/Cadena SER | 30–31 Aug 2010 | 1,000 | ? | 36.5 | 44.5 | 6.0 | 3.5 | 1.5 | 2.5 | 0.6 | – | – | – | 8.0 |
| JM&A | 6 Aug 2010 | ? | 68.2 | 31.6 | 42.9 | 5.6 | 4.0 | – | 4.7 | – | – | – | – | 11.3 |
| Celeste-Tel | 26–30 Jul 2010 | 1,100 | ? | 35.8; 147 | 43.9; 166 | 6.3; 7 | 3.6; 13 | 1.2; 6 | 3.2; 3 | 0.7; 2 | 1.0; 3 | 0.8; 1 | – | 8.1 |
| Metroscopia/El País | 28–29 Jul 2010 | 500 | 75.3 | 33.6 | 41.3 | – | – | – | – | – | – | – | – | 7.7 |
| CIS | 15–22 Jul 2010 | 2,472 | ? | 34.9 | 41.2 | 5.4 | 4.1 | 1.3 | 3.8 | 1.4 | 1.1 | 0.4 | – | 6.3 |
| Metroscopia/El País | 15 Jul 2010 | 500 | 75.3 | 34.5 | 43.3 | – | – | – | – | – | – | – | – | 8.8 |
| TNS Demoscopia/Antena 3 | 12–13 Jul 2010 | ? | 64.3 | 32.4 | 43.6 | 6.2 | 3.6 | 1.2 | 4.1 | 1.2 | – | – | – | 11.2 |
| NC Report/La Razón | 5–9 Jul 2010 | 1,000 | 69.8 | 35.8; 137/139 | 45.2; 173/175 | 6.3; 8/9 | 3.7; 13/14 | 1.2; 6 | 3.6; 3/4 | 0.9; 2/3 | 0.9; 2 | 0.6; 1/2 | – | 9.4 |
| GAD/COPE | 5–7 Jul 2010 | 500 | ? | 34.6; 136 | 43.3; 176 | 5.7; 8 | 3.4; 13 | 1.3; 7 | 3.1; 2 | 1.3; 3 | 0.8; 2 | 0.6; 2 | – | 8.7 |
| Celeste-Tel | 1–7 Jul 2010 | 1,100 | ? | 36.1; 147 | 43.8; 165 | 5.9; 7 | 3.6; 13 | 1.2; 6 | 3.1; 3 | 0.7; 2 | 1.0; 3 | 0.8; 1 | – | 7.7 |
| Ipsos | 30 Jun–2 Jul 2010 | 1,000 | ? | 33.3 | 42.9 | 5.9 | 3.7 | 1.6 | 3.9 | 1.3 | – | – | – | 9.6 |
| InvyMark/laSexta | 28 Jun–2 Jul 2010 | ? | ? | 37.4 | 44.8 | – | – | – | – | – | – | – | – | 7.4 |
| Metroscopia/El País | 1 Jul 2010 | 501 | 75.3 | 32.3 | 43.1 | – | – | – | – | – | – | – | – | 10.8 |
| InvyMark/laSexta | 14–18 Jun 2010 | ? | ? | 37.4 | 45.0 | – | – | – | – | – | – | – | – | 7.6 |
| TNS Demoscopia/Antena 3 | 14–15 Jun 2010 | ? | 67.8 | 31.6 | 44.5 | 7.7 | – | – | 4.3 | – | – | – | – | 12.9 |
| DYM/ABC | 3–10 Jun 2010 | 1,008 | ? | 33.5 | 45.3 | 6.4 | 4.2 | 0.8 | 2.9 | 0.9 | – | – | – | 11.8 |
| GAD/COPE | 7–9 Jun 2010 | 502 | ? | 34.7; 137 | 43.6; 178 | 4.9; 5 | 3.4; 13 | 1.2; 6 | 3.7; 3 | 1.2; 3 | ? 2 | ? 2 | – | 8.9 |
| Obradoiro de Socioloxía/Público | 17 May–9 Jun 2010 | ? | ? | 33.1 | 41.7 | 7.5 | 3.5 | 1.2 | 5.5 | 1.0 | 1.3 | – | – | 8.6 |
| Celeste-Tel | 1–7 Jun 2010 | 1,100 | ? | 36.8; 149 | 43.5; 163 | 5.9; 7 | 3.6; 13 | 1.2; 6 | 3.1; 3 | 0.7; 2 | 1.0; 3 | 0.8; 1 | – | 6.7 |
| InvyMark/laSexta | 31 May–4 Jun 2010 | ? | ? | 37.2 | 46.1 | – | – | – | – | – | – | – | – | 8.9 |
| Metroscopia/El País | 2 Jun 2010 | 506 | 75.3 | 32.5 | 43.0 | – | – | – | – | – | – | – | – | 10.5 |
| NC Report/La Razón | 25–28 May 2010 | 1,000 | 69.9 | 36.0; 137/139 | 45.0; 172/174 | 6.0; 8/9 | 3.5; 12/13 | 1.2; 6 | 3.7; 3/4 | 1.0; 2/3 | 0.9; 2/3 | 0.7; 2 | – | 9.0 |
| Sigma Dos/El Mundo | 25–27 May 2010 | 800 | ? | 35.1 | 45.6 | 5.1 | 3.3 | 1.2 | 3.0 | 0.8 | – | – | – | 10.5 |
| GESOP/El Periódico | 17–21 May 2010 | 1,500 | ? | 34.0; 131/134 | 42.0; 173/176 | 6.4; 10/11 | 3.6; 14/15 | 1.0; 5/6 | 5.0; 4/5 | 1.0; 1/3 | – | – | – | 8.0 |
| InvyMark/laSexta | 17–21 May 2010 | ? | ? | 39.7 | 45.1 | – | – | – | – | – | – | – | – | 5.4 |
| Obradoiro de Socioloxía/Público | 20 Apr–19 May 2010 | 4,002 | ? | 34.1 | 40.4 | 6.5 | 3.2 | 1.1 | 6.4 | 1.2 | 1.2 | – | – | 6.3 |
| Metroscopia/El País | 13 May 2010 | 510 | 75.3 | 33.7 | 42.8 | – | – | – | – | – | – | – | – | 9.1 |
| TNS Demoscopia/Antena 3 | 13 May 2010 | 1,000 | 67.5 | 32.1 | 44.3 | 7.0 | 3.5 | 1.1 | 4.2 | 0.9 | 0.6 | – | – | 12.2 |
| GAD/COPE | 10–12 May 2010 | 500 | ? | 35.9; 140 | 42.4; 173 | 5.2; 6 | 3.5; 13 | 1.1; 6 | 3.9; 4 | 1.1; 3 | 0.7; 2 | 0.7; 2 | – | 6.5 |
| Simple Lógica | 5–11 May 2010 | 508 | ? | 34.4 | 43.2 | 4.8 | 2.8 | 1.3 | 4.1 | – | – | – | – | 8.8 |
| Celeste-Tel | 3–7 May 2010 | 1,100 | ? | 38.2; 153 | 42.9; 161 | 5.5; 5 | 3.5; 13 | 1.1; 6 | 3.1; 3 | 0.7; 2 | 0.9; 3 | 0.9; 2 | – | 4.7 |
| InvyMark/laSexta | 3–7 May 2010 | ? | ? | 40.3 | 45.0 | – | – | – | – | – | – | – | – | 4.7 |
| NC Report/La Razón | 26–30 Apr 2010 | 1,000 | 70.6 | 37.4; 147/149 | 43.8; 168/170 | 5.8; 7/8 | 3.4; 11/12 | 1.1; 5/6 | 3.7; 2/3 | 1.0; 2 | ? 2 | ? 2 | – | 6.4 |
| Metroscopia/El País | 29 Apr 2010 | 512 | 75.3 | 37.5 | 41.7 | – | – | – | – | – | – | – | – | 4.2 |
| TNS Demoscopia/Antena 3 | 26–27 Apr 2010 | 1,000 | 62.0 | 36.1 | 41.5 | 5.4 | 3.1 | 1.1 | 3.0 | 0.9 | 0.6 | – | – | 5.4 |
| CIS | 6–14 Apr 2010 | 2,479 | ? | 38.0 | 39.5 | 5.8 | 3.6 | 1.3 | 3.3 | 1.0 | 0.7 | 0.6 | – | 1.5 |
| InvyMark/laSexta | 5–9 Apr 2010 | ? | ? | 40.6 | 44.7 | – | – | – | – | – | – | – | – | 4.1 |
| Metroscopia/El País | 8 Apr 2010 | 515 | 75.3 | 37.8 | 41.8 | – | – | – | – | – | – | – | – | 4.0 |
| Celeste-Tel | 1–8 Apr 2010 | 1,100 | ? | 38.3; 152 | 42.8; 162 | 5.5; 5 | 3.5; 13 | 1.2; 6 | 3.0; 3 | 0.7; 2 | 0.9; 3 | 0.9; 2 | – | 4.5 |
| NC Report/La Razón | 31 Mar 2010 | 1,000 | 70.7 | 37.6; 147/149 | 43.6; 167/169 | 5.7; 7/8 | 3.4; 11/12 | 1.2; 6 | 3.7; 2/3 | 1.0; 2 | ? 2 | ? 2 | – | 6.0 |
| InvyMark/laSexta | 22–26 Mar 2010 | ? | ? | 40.4 | 44.8 | – | – | – | – | – | – | – | – | 4.4 |
| InvyMark/laSexta | 8–12 Mar 2010 | ? | ? | 40.6 | 44.6 | – | – | – | – | – | – | – | – | 4.0 |
| GAD/COPE | 8–11 Mar 2010 | 500 | ? | 36.6; 143 | 42.5; 170 | 4.9; 5 | 3.5; 13 | 1.1; 6 | 4.1; 5 | 1.1; 3 | 0.8; 2 | 0.7; 2 | – | 5.9 |
| Celeste-Tel | 1–5 Mar 2010 | 1,100 | ? | 38.5; 153 | 42.6; 162 | 5.4; 5 | 3.4; 12 | 1.2; 6 | 3.1; 3 | 0.8; 2 | 0.9; 3 | 0.9; 2 | – | 4.1 |
| Celeste-Tel/Terra | 1–5 Mar 2010 | 1,357 | 71.1 | 38.1; 150/155 | 43.0; 165/170 | 5.8; 4/6 | 3.3; 11/12 | 1.1; 5/6 | 3.3; 2/3 | 1.1; 2/3 | 0.9; 2 | 0.8; 2 | – | 4.9 |
| Metroscopia/El País | 3–4 Mar 2010 | 500 | 75.3 | 37.3 | 43.4 | – | – | – | – | – | – | – | – | 6.1 |
| NC Report/La Razón | 24–26 Feb 2010 | 1,000 | 70.7 | 37.6; 148/150 | 43.6; 167/169 | 5.6; 6/7 | 3.4; 11/12 | 1.2; 6 | 3.7; 2/3 | 1.1; 2 | 0.8; 2 | 0.7; 2 | – | 6.0 |
| InvyMark/laSexta | 22–26 Feb 2010 | ? | ? | 40.5 | 44.6 | – | – | – | – | – | – | – | – | 4.1 |
| TNS Demoscopia/Antena 3 | 22–23 Feb 2010 | 1,008 | ? | 34.5 | 41.4 | 6.0 | 3.0 | 1.0 | 4.1 | 0.9 | 0.6 | – | – | 6.9 |
| Simple Lógica | 1–11 Feb 2010 | 1,007 | 68.9 | 35.7 | 46.3 | 5.3 | 2.8 | 0.9 | 3.9 | – | – | – | – | 10.6 |
| GAD/COPE | 3–10 Feb 2010 | 671 | ? | 36.3; 141 | 42.9; 172 | 5.0; 6 | 3.2; 12 | 1.1; 6 | 3.9; 4 | 1.1; 3 | 0.8; 2 | 0.7; 2 | – | 6.6 |
| NC Report/La Razón | 25 Jan–6 Feb 2010 | 1,000 | 70.7 | 37.9; 149/150 | 43.4; 167/169 | 5.4; 5/6 | 3.4; 11/12 | 1.2; 6 | 3.8; 2/3 | 1.1; 2 | ? 2 | ? 2 | – | 5.5 |
| InvyMark/laSexta | 1–5 Feb 2010 | ? | ? | 41.0 | 44.5 | – | – | – | – | – | – | – | – | 3.5 |
| Celeste-Tel | 1–5 Feb 2010 | 1,100 | ? | 38.1; 150 | 42.7; 162 | 5.8; 7 | 3.5; 12 | 1.1; 6 | 3.6; 3 | 0.9; 3 | 1.1; 3 | 1.0; 3 | – | 4.6 |
| Metroscopia/El País | 3–4 Feb 2010 | 500 | 75.3 | 37.5 | 43.4 | – | – | – | – | – | – | – | – | 5.9 |
| Sigma Dos/El Mundo | 2–4 Feb 2010 | 700 | ? | 37.7 | 43.5 | 4.5 | 3.1 | 1.2 | 2.0 | 1.2 | – | – | – | 5.8 |
| Obradoiro de Socioloxía/Público | 11–27 Jan 2010 | 3,206 | ? | 37.8 | 40.4 | 5.2 | 2.8 | 1.2 | 5.1 | 1.1 | 1.2 | – | – | 2.6 |
| TNS Demoscopia/Antena 3 | 25–26 Jan 2010 | ? | ? | 35.0 | 41.2 | 5.4 | 2.9 | 1.1 | 3.6 | 0.9 | 0.7 | – | – | 6.2 |
| CIS | 9–21 Jan 2010 | 2,477 | ? | 36.2 | 40.0 | 6.1 | 3.7 | 1.0 | 4.4 | 1.3 | 0.8 | 0.9 | – | 3.8 |
| GAD/COPE | 15 Jan 2010 | ? | ? | 38.8; 150 | 42.6; 169 | 4.1; 3 | 3.4; 12 | ? 6 | 3.1; 2 | ? 2 | ? 2 | ? 2 | – | 3.8 |
| InvyMark/laSexta | 11–15 Jan 2010 | ? | ? | 41.2 | 44.3 | – | – | – | – | – | – | – | – | 3.1 |
| Celeste-Tel | 4–11 Jan 2010 | 1,100 | ? | 38.5; 151 | 42.6; 163 | 5.5; 5 | 3.4; 12 | 1.1; 6 | 3.4; 3 | 0.9; 3 | 0.9; 3 | 0.9; 2 | – | 4.1 |
| NC Report/La Razón | 8 Jan 2010 | ? | 71.0 | 38.2; 150/152 | 43.3; 166/168 | 5.1; 4/5 | 3.4; 11/12 | 1.2; 6 | 3.6; 2/3 | 1.1; 2 | ? 2 | ? 2 | – | 5.1 |
| Metroscopia/El País | 7 Jan 2010 | 504 | 75.3 | 38.2 | 41.7 | – | – | – | – | – | – | – | – | 3.5 |
| Noxa/La Vanguardia | 28–29 Dec 2009 | 807 | ? | 39.4; 156 | 41.3; 164 | 4.7; 4 | 3.1; 10 | 1.1; 6 | 4.3; 4 | 0.6; 2 | – | – | – | 1.9 |
| Sigma Dos/El Mundo | 23–29 Dec 2009 | 1,000 | ? | 38.5 | 43.6 | 4.7 | 2.7 | 1.4 | 2.4 | 1.4 | – | – | – | 5.1 |
| InvyMark/laSexta | 21–25 Dec 2009 | ? | ? | 41.2 | 44.1 | – | – | – | – | – | – | – | – | 2.9 |
| DYM/ABC | 11–18 Dec 2009 | 1,038 | ? | 38.1 | 43.3 | 4.7 | 3.2 | 1.2 | 2.6 | 1.0 | – | – | – | 5.2 |
| GESOP/El Periódico | 14–17 Dec 2009 | 1,500 | ? | 36.5; 145/150 | 42.0; 165/170 | 4.8; 5/6 | 3.3; 11/12 | 1.0; 6/7 | 4.8; 3/5 | 1.0; 1/3 | – | – | – | 5.5 |
| TNS Demoscopia/Antena 3 | 14–15 Dec 2009 | ? | ? | 35.9 | 41.1 | 5.2 | 2.8 | 1.2 | 3.4 | 1.0 | 0.8 | – | – | 5.2 |
| GAD/COPE | 11 Dec 2009 | ? | ? | 37.9; 143 | 42.4; 169 | ? 6 | ? 12 | ? 4 | ? 6 | ? 3 | ? 2 | ? 3 | – | 4.5 |
| Celeste-Tel | 1–7 Dec 2009 | 1,100 | ? | 38.6; 152 | 42.4; 162 | 5.3; 5 | 3.4; 12 | 1.1; 6 | 3.2; 3 | 0.9; 3 | 0.9; 3 | 0.9; 2 | – | 3.8 |
| Metroscopia/El País | 2–3 Dec 2009 | 732 | 75.3 | 38.1 | 41.5 | – | – | – | – | – | – | – | – | 3.4 |
| Obradoiro de Socioloxía/Público | 9 Nov–2 Dec 2009 | 3,201 | ? | 38.0 | 39.6 | 5.0 | 3.0 | 1.1 | 5.7 | 1.3 | 1.0 | – | – | 1.6 |
| Consultores CSA/La Verdad | 29 Nov 2009 | ? | ? | 37.7 | 41.0 | – | – | – | – | – | – | – | – | 3.3 |
| NC Report/La Razón | 23–26 Nov 2009 | 1,000 | 71.1 | 38.3; 151/153 | 43.0; 165/167 | 5.2; 4/5 | 3.4; 11/12 | 1.2; 6 | 3.6; 2/3 | 1.1; 2 | – | – | – | 4.7 |
| TNS Demoscopia/Antena 3 | 16–17 Nov 2009 | ? | ? | 36.0 | 42.2 | 5.3 | 2.8 | 0.9 | 3.3 | 0.8 | 0.6 | – | – | 6.2 |
| GAD/COPE | 6–11 Nov 2009 | 650 | ? | 38.1; 142 | 42.2; 167 | – | – | – | – | – | – | – | – | 4.1 |
| Celeste-Tel | 2–6 Nov 2009 | 1,100 | ? | 38.8; 152 | 42.4; 162 | 5.3; 5 | 3.4; 12 | 1.1; 6 | 3.4; 3 | 0.9; 3 | 0.9; 3 | 0.9; 2 | – | 3.6 |
| Sigma Dos/El Mundo | 4–5 Nov 2009 | 1,000 | ? | 39.4 | 42.6 | 4.9 | 3.0 | 1.1 | 2.9 | 1.0 | – | – | – | 3.2 |
| Obradoiro de Socioloxía/Público | 13 Oct–4 Nov 2009 | 3,204 | ? | 36.9 | 40.5 | 4.7 | 3.2 | 1.4 | 5.3 | 1.1 | 1.4 | – | – | 3.6 |
| NC Report/La Razón | 28–30 Oct 2009 | 1,000 | 71.6 | 39.7; 155/156 | 41.9; 163/164 | 5.1; 4/5 | 3.4; 11/12 | 1.2; 6 | 3.4; 2/3 | 1.0; 2 | – | – | – | 2.2 |
| Metroscopia/El País | 28–29 Oct 2009 | 501 | 75.3 | 39.9 | 40.3 | – | – | – | – | – | – | – | – | 0.4 |
| Ipsos/Expansión | 23–25 Oct 2009 | 1,000 | 66 | 40.0 | 42.0 | – | – | – | 1.4 | – | – | – | – | 2.0 |
| Simple Lógica | 15–21 Oct 2009 | 1,025 | 66.5 | 37.4 | 41.8 | 3.6 | 3.3 | 1.0 | 3.5 | – | – | – | – | 4.4 |
| Intercampo/GETS | 15 Sep–17 Oct 2009 | 1,739 | High | 39.5 | 44.7 | 4.1 | 3.2 | 1.1 | 2.7 | 1.1 | – | – | – | 5.2 |
| Intercampo/GETS | 15 Sep–17 Oct 2009 | 1,739 | Low | 38.7 | 45.2 | 4.3 | 3.3 | 0.9 | 2.8 | 1.1 | – | – | – | 6.5 |
| Metroscopia/El País | 15 Oct 2009 | 500 | 75.3 | 39.0 | 41.3 | – | – | – | – | – | – | – | – | 2.3 |
| CIS | 7–14 Oct 2009 | 2,478 | ? | 37.7 | 41.0 | 4.7 | 3.7 | 1.3 | 3.7 | 1.5 | 0.8 | 0.5 | – | 3.3 |
| Celeste-Tel | 1–7 Oct 2009 | 1,100 | ? | 39.6; 153 | 42.0; 161 | 5.2; 5 | 3.4; 12 | 1.1; 6 | 3.2; 3 | 0.9; 3 | 0.9; 3 | 0.9; 2 | – | 2.4 |
| Obradoiro de Socioloxía/Público | 16 Sep–7 Oct 2009 | 3,202 | ? | 38.0 | 43.0 | 4.4 | 2.2 | 0.8 | 5.2 | 0.8 | 1.0 | – | – | 5.0 |
| TNS Demoscopia/Antena 3 | 5–6 Oct 2009 | 1,003 | ? | 36.8 | 41.4 | 5.3 | 3.0 | 1.1 | 3.2 | 1.0 | 0.6 | – | – | 4.6 |
| NC Report/La Razón | 28 Sep–2 Oct 2009 | 1,000 | 71.6 | 39.8; 154/155 | 42.1; 164/165 | 5.0; 4/5 | 3.4; 11/12 | 1.2; 6 | 3.2; 2/3 | 1.0; 2 | ? 2 | ? 2 | – | 2.3 |
| Metroscopia/El País | 30 Sep–1 Oct 2009 | 501 | 75.3 | 38.0 | 41.6 | – | – | – | – | – | – | – | – | 3.6 |
| Noxa/La Vanguardia | 28 Sep–1 Oct 2009 | 1,000 | ? | 38.0; 151 | 42.4; 169 | 5.5; 4 | 2.5; 9 | 0.9; 5 | 4.4; 4 | 1.4; 3 | – | – | – | 4.4 |
| InvyMark/laSexta | 21–25 Sep 2009 | ? | ? | 41.0 | 43.8 | – | – | – | – | – | – | – | – | 2.8 |
| InvyMark/laSexta | 7–11 Sep 2009 | ? | ? | 41.1 | 43.6 | – | – | – | – | – | – | – | – | 2.5 |
| Celeste-Tel | 1–7 Sep 2009 | 1,100 | ? | 39.9; 154 | 41.8; 160 | 5.1; 5 | 3.3; 12 | 1.1; 6 | 3.1; 3 | 0.9; 3 | 0.9; 3 | 0.9; 2 | – | 1.9 |
| NC Report/La Razón | 1–3 Sep 2009 | 1,000 | 71.7 | 39.9; 155/156 | 42.0; 164/165 | 4.9; 3/4 | 3.3; 11 | 1.2; 6 | 3.2; 2/3 | 1.1; 2 | ? 2 | ? 2 | – | 2.1 |
| CIS | 7–13 Jul 2009 | 2,482 | ? | 39.0 | 40.2 | 4.6 | 3.4 | 1.2 | 3.2 | 1.6 | 0.8 | 0.5 | – | 1.2 |
| InvyMark/laSexta | 6–10 Jul 2009 | ? | ? | 41.7 | 42.9 | – | – | – | – | – | – | – | – | 1.1 |
| Metroscopia/El País | 8–9 Jul 2009 | 500 | 75.3 | 38.7 | 41.8 | – | – | – | – | – | – | – | – | 3.1 |
| Celeste-Tel | 1–7 Jul 2009 | 1,100 | ? | 40.1; 155 | 41.7; 159 | 5.1; 5 | 3.2; 12 | 1.2; 6 | 3.1; 3 | 1.0; 3 | 0.9; 3 | 0.9; 2 | – | 1.6 |
| NC Report/La Razón | 1–3 Jul 2009 | 1,000 | 71.7 | 40.3; 156/157 | 42.1; 162/163 | 4.6; 3/4 | 3.3; 11/12 | 1.3; 6 | 3.1; 2/3 | 1.0; 2 | 0.8; 2 | 0.7; 2 | – | 1.8 |
| InvyMark/laSexta | 22–26 Jun 2009 | ? | ? | 41.8 | 42.8 | – | – | – | – | – | – | – | – | 1.0 |
| TNS Demoscopia/Antena 3 | 22–23 Jun 2009 | ? | ? | 39.2 | 41.7 | 4.4 | 3.1 | 1.1 | 4.0 | 1.1 | 0.6 | – | – | 2.5 |
| Obradoiro de Socioloxía/Público | 25 May–17 Jun 2009 | 3,200 | ? | 40.3 | 41.8 | 3.9 | 2.8 | 0.8 | 3.7 | 0.9 | 0.9 | – | – | 1.5 |
| InvyMark/laSexta | 8–12 Jun 2009 | ? | ? | 41.5 | 42.9 | – | – | – | – | – | – | – | – | 1.4 |
| Metroscopia/El País | 8–9 Jun 2009 | 500 | 75.3 | 38.9 | 40.9 | – | – | – | – | – | – | – | – | 2.0 |
| NC Report/La Razón | 8 Jun 2009 | 1,000 | 71.8 | 40.2; 157/158 | 41.8; 162/164 | 4.8; 3/4 | 3.3; 11/12 | 1.2; 6 | 3.0; 2/3 | 1.1; 2 | 0.8; 2 | 0.7; 2 | – | 1.6 |
| 2009 EP election | 7 Jun 2009 | —N/a | 44.9 | 38.8 (149) | 42.1 (169) | 3.7 (3) | 2.8 (13) | 1.3 (6) | 2.9 (2) | 1.3 (4) | 0.7 (0) | 0.6 (2) | 0.9 (2) | 3.3 |
| Celeste-Tel | 1–5 Jun 2009 | 1,100 | ? | 39.7; 155 | 42.0; 159 | 5.3; 5 | 3.3; 12 | 1.2; 6 | 3.3; 3 | 1.0; 3 | 0.9; 3 | 0.9; 2 | – | 2.3 |
| Sigma Dos/El Mundo | 26–28 May 2009 | 1,000 | ? | 40.6 | 42.8 | 3.4 | – | – | 2.6 | – | – | – | – | 2.2 |
| DYM/ABC | 25–28 May 2009 | 1,040 | ? | 38.7 | 40.9 | 3.3 | – | – | 2.2 | – | – | – | – | 2.2 |
| Noxa/La Vanguardia | 25–28 May 2009 | 1,000 | ? | 40.8; 162/164 | 38.0; 150/153 | 4.2; 3 | 4.0; 14/16 | 1.4; 6/7 | 4.8; 5 | 0.9; 1 | – | – | – | 2.8 |
| InvyMark/laSexta | 18–22 May 2009 | ? | ? | 41.6 | 42.0 | – | – | – | – | – | – | – | – | 0.4 |
| Obradoiro de Socioloxía/Público | 27 Apr–20 May 2009 | 3,206 | ? | 41.1 | 42.2 | 3.7 | 2.6 | 1.0 | 3.5 | 1.0 | 0.8 | – | – | 1.1 |
| GESOP/El Periódico | 11–15 May 2009 | 1,500 | ? | 38.7; 155/157 | 42.3; 167/169 | 3.9; 2/3 | 3.0; 10/11 | 0.8; 3/4 | 3.3; 2/3 | 0.8; 1 | – | – | – | 3.6 |
| Celeste-Tel | 4–8 May 2009 | 1,100 | ? | 39.9; 157 | 41.1; 158 | 5.5; 4 | 3.3; 12 | 1.2; 6 | 3.4; 3 | 1.1; 3 | 1.0; 3 | 0.9; 2 | – | 1.2 |
| NC Report/La Razón | 27–30 Apr 2009 | 1,000 | 70.3 | 39.1; 156/158 | 41.5; 160/162 | 5.6; 3/6 | 3.5; 11/12 | 1.2; 6 | 3.3; 2/3 | 1.1; 2/3 | 0.8; 2 | 0.8; 2 | – | 2.4 |
| Metroscopia/El País | 27–28 Apr 2009 | 505 | 75.3 | 39.6 | 40.8 | – | – | – | – | – | – | – | – | 1.2 |
| Obradoiro de Socioloxía/Público | 24 Mar–22 Apr 2009 | 3,204 | ? | 40.0 | 42.3 | 3.8 | 2.8 | 1.1 | 3.5 | 1.0 | 0.6 | – | – | 2.3 |
| CIS | 14–21 Apr 2009 | 2,481 | ? | 40.8 | 40.0 | 4.5 | 3.4 | 1.0 | 2.9 | 1.5 | 0.6 | – | – | 0.8 |
| Sigma Dos/El Mundo | 3–8 Apr 2009 | 900 | ? | 37.9 | 42.3 | 5.0 | – | – | 4.4 | – | – | – | – | 4.4 |
| Celeste-Tel | 1–7 Apr 2009 | 1,100 | ? | 40.1; 160 | 40.9; 156 | 5.4; 4 | 3.3; 11 | 1.2; 6 | 3.3; 3 | 1.1; 3 | 1.0; 3 | 0.9; 2 | – | 0.8 |
| NC Report/La Razón | 28 Mar 2009 | ? | 71.2 | 39.9; 157/159 | 40.8; 158/161 | 5.5; 4/5 | 3.4; 11/12 | 1.2; 6 | 3.3; 2/3 | 1.1; 2/3 | 0.9; 2 | 0.8; 2/3 | – | 0.9 |
| InvyMark/laSexta | 23–27 Mar 2009 | ? | ? | 41.9 | 41.6 | – | – | – | – | – | – | – | – | 0.3 |
| TNS Demoscopia/Antena 3 | 23–24 Mar 2009 | ? | ? | 41.2 | 40.5 | 4.8 | 3.0 | 1.0 | 3.6 | 1.1 | 0.5 | – | – | 0.7 |
| Obradoiro de Socioloxía/Público | 25 Feb–18 Mar 2009 | 3,205 | ? | 39.2 | 40.7 | 5.0 | 3.2 | 1.0 | 3.7 | 0.9 | 0.5 | – | – | 1.5 |
| Celeste-Tel | 2–6 Mar 2009 | 1,100 | ? | 40.4; 161 | 40.7; 154 | 5.3; 4 | 3.1; 11 | 1.3; 6 | 3.2; 3 | 1.2; 4 | 1.1; 3 | 0.9; 2 | – | 0.3 |
| NC Report/La Razón | 4 Mar 2009 | ? | ? | 40.4 | 40.2 | – | – | – | – | – | – | – | – | 0.2 |
| Simple Lógica | 13–23 Feb 2009 | 1,012 | 68.5 | 43.2 | 37.6 | 3.7 | 2.8 | 1.1 | 3.2 | – | – | – | – | 5.6 |
| GESOP/El Periódico | 12–13 Feb 2009 | 800 | ? | 41.0; 161/164 | 38.5; 154/156 | 4.8; 4/5 | 2.8; 10/11 | 1.1; 6 | 4.4; 3/5 | 1.0; 2 | – | – | – | 2.5 |
| Celeste-Tel | 2–6 Feb 2009 | 1,100 | ? | 40.6; 162 | 40.3; 152 | 5.2; 4 | 3.2; 12 | 1.4; 6 | 3.3; 3 | 1.2; 4 | 1.1; 3 | 0.9; 2 | – | 0.3 |
| InvyMark/laSexta | 26–30 Jan 2009 | ? | ? | 42.7 | 41.0 | – | – | – | – | – | – | – | – | 1.7 |
| NC Report/La Razón | 26–30 Jan 2009 | 1,000 | 70.5 | 41.7; 161/163 | 38.5; 150/152 | 5.3; 4/5 | 3.4; 11/12 | 1.3; 6/7 | 3.6; 3/4 | 1.1; 3 | 0.9; 2/3 | 0.8; 2/3 | – | 3.2 |
| Obradoiro de Socioloxía/Público | 10–20 Jan 2009 | 1,600 | ? | 40.2 | 36.7 | 5.0 | 2.7 | 1.0 | 6.0 | 1.0 | 0.8 | – | – | 3.5 |
| CIS | 9–19 Jan 2009 | 2,482 | ? | 39.7 | 39.5 | 4.5 | 3.4 | 1.1 | 3.1 | 1.3 | 1.0 | – | – | 0.2 |
| InvyMark/laSexta | 12–16 Jan 2009 | ? | ? | 42.2 | 41.2 | – | – | – | – | – | – | – | – | 1.0 |
| Celeste-Tel | 2–9 Jan 2009 | 1,100 | ? | 40.8; 162 | 40.6; 153 | 5.2; 4 | 3.1; 12 | 1.3; 6 | 3.1; 3 | 1.2; 4 | 1.0; 3 | 0.9; 2 | – | 0.2 |
| NC Report/La Razón | 29 Dec–2 Jan 2009 | 1,000 | 71.5 | 41.6; 162/164 | 39.6; 151/153 | 4.9; 4/5 | 3.3; 11/12 | 1.3; 6 | 3.2; 3/4 | 1.1; 3 | 0.9; 2 | 0.8; 2 | – | 2.0 |
| Sigma Dos/El Mundo | 22–26 Dec 2008 | 1,000 | ? | 42.6 | 39.7 | 3.4 | 3.2 | 1.4 | 3.1 | 1.0 | – | – | – | 2.9 |
| Noxa/La Vanguardia | 15–19 Dec 2008 | 1,000 | ? | 40.7; 161/164 | 37.5; 148/152 | 4.8; 4/5 | 3.3; 11/13 | 1.6; 6/7 | 5.8; 5/6 | 1.0; 2/3 | – | – | – | 3.2 |
| InvyMark/laSexta | 15–19 Dec 2008 | ? | ? | 41.8 | 41.5 | – | – | – | – | – | – | – | – | 0.3 |
| Obradoiro de Socioloxía/Público | 25 Nov–18 Dec 2008 | 3,198 | ? | 41.3 | 38.9 | 4.5 | 2.6 | 1.2 | 3.5 | 1.2 | 1.1 | – | – | 2.4 |
| Celeste-Tel | 1–5 Dec 2008 | 1,100 | ? | 40.9; 162 | 40.5; 156 | 5.1; 4 | 3.2; 11 | 1.3; 6 | 2.7; 3 | 1.0; 3 | 0.9; 2 | 0.9; 2 | – | 0.4 |
| InvyMark/laSexta | 24–28 Nov 2008 | ? | ? | 42.3 | 40.8 | – | – | – | – | – | – | – | – | 1.5 |
| NC Report/La Razón | 24–27 Nov 2008 | 1,000 | 71.2 | 39.8; 155/157 | 41.5; 161/163 | 4.9; 4/5 | 3.3; 10/11 | 1.3; 6/7 | 2.8; 2/3 | 1.0; 2/3 | 0.9; 2/3 | 0.8; 2 | – | 1.7 |
| DYM/ABC | 13–20 Nov 2008 | 1,012 | ? | 41.9 | 42.2 | 3.7 | – | – | – | – | – | – | – | 0.3 |
| Obradoiro de Socioloxía/Público | 27 Oct–20 Nov 2008 | 3,203 | ? | 41.3 | 39.2 | 4.0 | 3.2 | 1.2 | 4.0 | 1.2 | 1.0 | – | – | 2.1 |
| Celeste-Tel | 3–7 Nov 2008 | 1,100 | ? | 41.2; 163 | 40.9; 156 | 5.0; 4 | 3.1; 11 | 1.2; 6 | 2.7; 2 | 0.9; 3 | 0.9; 2 | 0.8; 2 | – | 0.3 |
| NC Report/La Razón | 27–30 Oct 2008 | 1,000 | 71.7 | 41.0; 159/162 | 41.1; 158/159 | 4.8; 4/5 | 3.2; 10/11 | 1.3; 6/7 | 2.7; 2 | 1.0; 2/3 | – | – | – | 0.1 |
| GESOP/El Periódico | 20–24 Oct 2008 | 1,500 | ? | 40.2; 154/158 | 41.3; 160/164 | 4.8; 4/5 | 2.9; 10/11 | 1.1; 6 | 2.9; 2/3 | 1.1; 3 | – | – | – | 1.1 |
| Obradoiro de Socioloxía/Público | 29 Sep–23 Oct 2008 | 3,203 | ? | 39.4 | 39.4 | 3.4 | 3.8 | 1.0 | 4.2 | 1.3 | 0.9 | – | – | Tie |
| TNS Demoscopia/Antena 3 | 9–10 Oct 2008 | ? | ? | 40.7 | 42.4 | – | – | – | – | – | – | – | – | 1.7 |
| CIS | 1–9 Oct 2008 | 2,481 | ? | 39.7 | 39.7 | 4.3 | 3.8 | 1.1 | 2.9 | 1.3 | 1.0 | – | – | Tie |
| Intercampo/GETS | 17 Sep–8 Oct 2008 | 1,729 | High | 40.4 | 41.2 | 4.0 | 2.7 | 1.6 | 3.7 | 1.2 | – | – | – | 0.8 |
| Intercampo/GETS | 17 Sep–8 Oct 2008 | 1,729 | Low | 40.5 | 41.3 | 4.1 | 2.7 | 1.7 | 3.1 | 1.1 | – | – | – | 0.8 |
| Celeste-Tel | 1–7 Oct 2008 | 1,100 | ? | 41.4; 163 | 40.6; 155 | 5.0; 4 | 3.0; 12 | 1.2; 6 | 2.8; 2 | 1.0; 3 | 0.9; 2 | 0.7; 2 | – | 0.8 |
| Simple Lógica | 29 Sep–7 Oct 2008 | 1,006 | 72.5 | 39.7 | 39.4 | 4.6 | 2.8 | 1.6 | 2.8 | – | – | – | – | 0.3 |
| InvyMark/laSexta | 29 Sep–3 Oct 2008 | ? | ? | 41.7 | 41.2 | – | – | – | – | – | – | – | – | 0.5 |
| NC Report/La Razón | 29 Sep–2 Oct 2008 | 1,000 | 71.5 | 41.2; 160/162 | 41.0; 156/157 | 4.6; 4/5 | 3.2; 10 | 1.3; 6 | 2.7; 2/3 | 0.9; 3 | – | – | – | 0.2 |
| Obradoiro de Socioloxía/Público | 8–25 Sep 2008 | 3,171 | ? | 38.6 | 39.4 | 4.5 | 3.2 | 1.3 | 2.8 | 1.0 | 1.2 | – | – | 0.8 |
| Noxa/La Vanguardia | 15–18 Sep 2008 | 1,000 | ? | 40.6; 159/161 | 39.6; 152/155 | 5.2; 5/6 | 3.1; 11/12 | 1.2; 6 | 4.2; 3/4 | 1.2; 2/3 | – | – | – | 1.0 |
| Celeste-Tel | 1–5 Sep 2008 | 1,100 | ? | 41.4; 161 | 40.5; 154 | 5.2; 5 | 3.3; 11 | 1.3; 6 | 2.8; 3 | 1.2; 4 | 1.1; 3 | 0.9; 2 | – | 0.9 |
| Celeste-Tel | 1–7 Aug 2008 | 1,100 | ? | 41.8; 162 | 40.2; 154 | 5.1; 5 | 3.3; 11 | 1.3; 6 | 2.7; 3 | 1.3; 4 | 1.1; 2 | 0.9; 2 | – | 1.6 |
| CIS | 7–13 Jul 2008 | 2,468 | ? | 39.5 | 39.3 | 4.8 | 3.3 | 1.1 | 2.5 | 1.5 | 0.9 | – | – | 0.2 |
| Metroscopia/El País | 9–10 Jul 2008 | 703 | ? | 41.2 | 41.0 | – | – | – | – | – | – | – | – | 0.2 |
| Celeste-Tel | 1–7 Jul 2008 | 1,100 | ? | 42.4; 164 | 40.3; 153 | 4.4; 3 | 3.3; 11 | 1.2; 6 | 2.7; 3 | 1.3; 4 | 1.1; 3 | 0.8; 2 | – | 2.1 |
| InvyMark/laSexta | 23–27 Jun 2008 | ? | ? | 43.6 | 40.0 | – | – | – | – | – | – | – | – | 3.6 |
| Opina/Cadena SER | 26 Jun 2008 | 1,000 | ? | 42.0 | 41.0 | 5.0 | 3.0 | 1.0 | 2.0 | 1.0 | – | – | – | 1.0 |
| ASEP (Note: Undecided and/or abstentionists excluded.) | 9–15 Jun 2008 | 1,203 | 71.3 | 41.8 | 39.6 | 4.6 | – | – | 1.7 | – | – | – | – | 2.2 |
| Opina/Cadena SER | 12 Jun 2008 | 1,000 | ? | 40.0 | 40.0 | 4.0 | 3.0 | 1.3 | 2.0 | 0.9 | – | – | – | Tie |
| Sigma Dos/El Mundo | 10–12 Jun 2008 | 1,000 | ? | 41.3 | 40.2 | 4.8 | 3.2 | 1.2 | 2.7 | 0.9 | – | – | – | 1.1 |
| Celeste-Tel | 2–6 Jun 2008 | 1,100 | ? | 43.4; 168 | 39.6; 152 | 4.3; 2 | 3.4; 11 | 1.3; 6 | 2.7; 3 | 1.0; 3 | 1.0; 2 | 0.9; 2 | – | 3.8 |
| GESOP/El Periódico | 26–30 May 2008 | 1,500 | ? | 45.0; 173/176 | 37.3; 145/148 | 4.2; 2/3 | 2.8; 10 | 1.2; 6 | 2.5; 2 | 1.0; 2/3 | – | – | – | 7.7 |
| ASEP | 12–18 May 2008 | 1,209 | 73.6 | 43.8 | 39.3 | 4.3 | – | – | 1.5 | – | – | – | – | 4.5 |
| Celeste-Tel | 2–8 May 2008 | 1,100 | ? | 44.5; 169 | 39.4; 152 | 4.2; 2 | 3.3; 11 | 1.2; 6 | 2.6; 2 | 0.9; 3 | 0.9; 2 | 0.8; 2 | – | 5.1 |
| CIS | 24–30 Apr 2008 | 2,459 | ? | 43.6 | 37.6 | 3.9 | 3.2 | 1.5 | 2.6 | 1.6 | 1.1 | – | – | 6.0 |
| ASEP | 14–20 Apr 2008 | 1,204 | 76.6 | 44.1 | 39.6 | 4.0 | – | – | 1.3 | – | – | – | – | 4.5 |
| Celeste-Tel | 1–7 Apr 2008 | 1,100 | ? | 44.9; 171 | 39.5; 151 | 3.9; 2 | 3.0; 10 | 1.2; 6 | 2.4; 2 | 1.0; 3 | 0.9; 2 | 0.7; 2 | – | 5.4 |
| 2008 general election | 9 Mar 2008 | —N/a | 73.8 | 43.9; 169 | 39.9; 154 | 3.8; 2 | 3.0; 10 | 1.2; 6 | 1.2; 1 | 1.2; 3 | 0.8; 2 | 0.7; 2 | – | 4.0 |

==== Voting preferences ====
The table below lists raw, unweighted voting preferences.

| Polling firm/Commissioner | Fieldwork date | Sample size | PSOE | PP | IU–LV | CiU | PNV | UPyD | ERC | BNG | CC | Amaiur | Question | X mark | Lead |
|---|---|---|---|---|---|---|---|---|---|---|---|---|---|---|---|
| 2011 general election (Note: Does not include non-resident citizens.) | 20 Nov 2011 | —N/a | 20.3 | 31.6 | 4.9 | 3.0 | 0.9 | 3.3 | 0.7 | 0.5 | 0.4 | 1.0 | —N/a | 28.3 | 11.3 |
| GESOP/El Periódico | 7–12 Nov 2011 | 2,070 | 19.6 | 37.0 | 5.1 | 2.7 | 1.1 | 3.9 | 1.2 | – | – | 0.8 | 17.1 | 3.5 | 17.4 |
| Simple Lógica | 2–10 Nov 2011 | 1,009 | 17.4 | 24.3 | 3.6 | 2.4 | 0.3 | 3.0 | – | – | – | – | 27.0 | 17.0 | 6.9 |
| Metroscopia/El País | 18 Oct–8 Nov 2011 | 9,675 | 18.5 | 30.3 | 6.0 | 2.2 | 0.7 | 2.9 | 0.6 | 0.5 | 0.2 | 0.4 | 26.9 | 3.5 | 11.8 |
| TNS Demoscopia/CEMOP | 2–7 Nov 2011 | 1,505 | 16.9 | 28.7 | 5.9 | 1.9 | 0.7 | 2.7 | 0.8 | – | – | – | 26.1 | 12.1 | 11.8 |
| Ipsos/La Nueva España | 1–6 Nov 2011 | 3,935 | 25.5 | 36.2 | 6.0 | 3.1 | 0.9 | 4.4 | 0.6 | 0.5 | 0.3 | 0.2 | – | – | 10.7 |
| CIS | 6–23 Oct 2011 | 17,236 | 17.9 | 30.5 | 4.5 | 1.9 | 0.7 | 2.3 | 0.6 | 0.4 | 0.2 | 0.7 | 23.6 | 9.3 | 12.6 |
| Obradoiro de Socioloxía/Público | 17–20 Oct 2011 | 1,800 | 18.7 | 27.7 | 4.5 | 1.8 | 1.1 | 1.7 | 0.6 | 0.6 | – | 0.7 | – | – | 9.0 |
| Metroscopia/El País | 11–13 Oct 2011 | 1,500 | 17.7 | 30.9 | 5.1 | 1.9 | – | 2.9 | – | – | – | – | 29.5 | 2.9 | 13.2 |
| GESOP/El Periódico | 19–22 Sep 2011 | 1,000 | 22.3 | 38.3 | 3.0 | 3.1 | 0.8 | 4.2 | 0.8 | – | – | – | 15.3 | 4.6 | 16.0 |
| Metroscopia/El País | 7–8 Sep 2011 | 1,002 | 21.9 | 28.4 | 5.0 | 2.0 | – | 3.4 | – | – | – | – | 13.5 | 14.1 | 6.5 |
| DYM/ABC | 2–3 Aug 2011 | 1,076 | 13.8 | 20.4 | – | – | – | – | – | – | – | – | – | – | 6.6 |
| Metroscopia/El País | 27–28 Jul 2011 | 1,203 | 23.0 | 31.0 | 6.0 | – | – | 4.0 | – | – | – | – | 12.0 | 12.0 | 8.0 |
| CIS | 4–11 Jul 2011 | 2,475 | 25.9 | 29.3 | 3.7 | 1.9 | 1.1 | 2.5 | 0.7 | 0.2 | 0.2 | – | 16.7 | 10.6 | 3.4 |
| ASEP | 1 Jun–1 Jul 2011 | 1,110 | 18.5 | 25.1 | 4.3 | 2.3 | 1.3 | 1.9 | 0.5 | 0.2 | 0.2 | – | 23.9 | 14.7 | 6.6 |
| Metroscopia/El País | 29–30 Jun 2011 | 1,001 | 20.9 | 30.7 | 6.3 | – | – | 3.7 | – | – | – | – | 14.2 | 8.9 | 9.8 |
| Metroscopia/El País | 1–2 Jun 2011 | 1,001 | 21.4 | 33.5 | 6.9 | – | – | 3.6 | – | – | – | – | 13.9 | 6.6 | 12.1 |
| GESOP/El Periódico | 30 May–1 Jun 2011 | 1,000 | 24.7 | 32.6 | 5.7 | 2.6 | 0.9 | 4.1 | 0.5 | – | – | – | 12.4 | 6.2 | 7.9 |
| ASEP | 1–31 May 2011 | 1,108 | 20.1 | 25.4 | 5.3 | 1.6 | 1.4 | 1.6 | 0.4 | 0.5 | 0.1 | – | 23.5 | 11.3 | 5.3 |
| Metroscopia/El País | 27–28 Apr 2011 | 1,200 | 25.8 | 33.1 | 5.8 | – | – | 2.5 | – | – | – | – | 13.8 | 5.8 | 7.3 |
| Ikerfel/Vocento | 4–22 Apr 2011 | 45,635 | 26.6 | 38.6 | – | – | – | – | – | – | – | – | – | – | 12.0 |
| Obradoiro de Socioloxía/Público | 11–19 Apr 2011 | 2,005 | 22.8 | 25.2 | 4.9 | 2.2 | 0.9 | 1.6 | 0.6 | 0.7 | – | – | – | – | 2.4 |
| CIS | 1–8 Apr 2011 | 2,463 | 20.5 | 27.1 | 4.1 | 2.1 | 0.8 | 2.5 | 0.7 | 0.3 | 0.2 | – | 20.4 | 12.9 | 6.6 |
| Metroscopia/El País | 30–31 Mar 2011 | 1,004 | 19.9 | 31.0 | 4.8 | – | – | 2.2 | – | – | – | – | 15.8 | 9.6 | 11.1 |
| Obradoiro de Socioloxía/Público | 21–24 Mar 2011 | 1,201 | 16.6 | 27.4 | 5.0 | 2.4 | 1.1 | 2.9 | 0.4 | 0.8 | – | – | – | – | 10.8 |
| Metroscopia/El País | 2–3 Mar 2011 | 1,004 | 18.8 | 31.7 | 5.4 | – | – | 2.6 | – | – | – | – | 14.4 | 11.3 | 12.9 |
| ASEP | 1 Feb–2 Mar 2011 | 1,189 | 17.2 | 25.6 | 4.6 | 1.7 | 1.3 | 1.2 | 1.0 | 0.2 | 0.2 | – | 23.3 | 17.5 | 8.4 |
| Obradoiro de Socioloxía/Público | 21–25 Feb 2011 | 1,982 | 16.2 | 26.8 | 4.2 | 2.1 | 0.8 | 3.5 | 0.7 | 0.7 | – | – | – | – | 10.6 |
| Metroscopia/El País | 2–3 Feb 2011 | 1,005 | 20.2 | 30.3 | 6.1 | – | – | 2.3 | – | – | – | – | 15.2 | 10.9 | 10.1 |
| Obradoiro de Socioloxía/Público | 17–21 Jan 2011 | 2,082 | 16.6 | 27.9 | 3.9 | 2.6 | 0.8 | 2.3 | 0.3 | 0.4 | – | – | – | – | 11.3 |
| CIS | 7–16 Jan 2011 | 2,478 | 21.5 | 28.3 | 4.4 | 3.3 | 0.6 | 2.6 | 0.5 | 0.6 | 0.1 | – | 17.7 | 12.7 | 6.8 |
| Metroscopia/El País | 3–4 Jan 2011 | 1,023 | 20.9 | 26.9 | 6.8 | – | – | 1.9 | – | – | – | – | 17.2 | 11.7 | 6.0 |
| DYM/ABC | 20–30 Dec 2010 | 1,058 | 14.7 | 28.8 | – | – | – | – | – | – | – | – | – | – | 14.1 |
| GESOP/El Periódico | 15–17 Dec 2010 | 1,000 | 20.9 | 34.2 | 5.5 | 3.3 | 0.8 | 3.8 | 0.8 | – | – | – | 11.8 | 7.6 | 13.3 |
| Obradoiro de Socioloxía/Público | 13–16 Dec 2010 | 1,600 | 16.2 | 27.4 | 4.9 | 2.8 | 1.1 | 2.9 | 0.6 | 0.4 | – | – | – | – | 11.2 |
| Metroscopia/El País | 1–2 Dec 2010 | 1,000 | 20.1 | 29.4 | 5.9 | – | – | 3.1 | – | – | – | – | 15.6 | 12.3 | 9.3 |
| Obradoiro de Socioloxía/Público | 2–11 Nov 2010 | 2,402 | 19.2 | 26.9 | 4.2 | 2.7 | 0.8 | 3.6 | 0.4 | 0.8 | – | – | – | – | 7.7 |
| Metroscopia/El País | 2–4 Nov 2010 | 1,000 | 23.3 | 26.0 | 7.1 | – | – | 3.1 | – | – | – | – | 16.5 | 11.3 | 2.7 |
| ASEP | 1–31 Oct 2010 | 1,096 | 21.7 | 26.6 | 4.1 | 1.6 | 0.7 | 1.9 | 0.6 | 0.1 | 0.3 | – | 19.3 | 15.3 | 4.9 |
| Intercampo/GETS | 15 Sep–17 Oct 2010 | 1,734 | 21.4 | 19.3 | 5.6 | 2.5 | 1.4 | 2.0 | – | – | – | – | – | – | 2.1 |
| CIS | 4–14 Oct 2010 | 2,475 | 18.7 | 24.8 | 3.8 | 1.7 | 1.1 | 3.2 | 0.4 | 0.3 | 0.3 | – | 21.1 | 16.3 | 6.1 |
| Obradoiro de Socioloxía/Público | 20 Sep–7 Oct 2010 | 2,329 | 16.3 | 27.3 | 4.7 | 2.8 | 0.6 | 3.2 | 0.7 | 0.9 | – | – | – | – | 11.0 |
| Metroscopia/El País | 30 Sep 2010 | 500 | 19.0 | 29.0 | 4.4 | – | – | 2.2 | – | – | – | – | 17.8 | 12.8 | 10.0 |
| Metroscopia/El País | 1–2 Sep 2010 | 500 | 25.0 | 27.5 | 4.8 | – | – | 5.0 | – | – | – | – | 7.2 | 13.0 | 2.5 |
| Metroscopia/El País | 28–29 Jul 2010 | 500 | 23.8 | 28.2 | 6.8 | – | – | 3.8 | – | – | – | – | 11.4 | 13.4 | 4.4 |
| CIS | 15–22 Jul 2010 | 2,472 | 20.8 | 24.8 | 4.0 | 2.6 | 0.8 | 3.0 | 1.1 | 0.4 | 0.1 | – | 19.2 | 14.9 | 4.0 |
| Metroscopia/El País | 15 Jul 2010 | 500 | 27.4 | 34.5 | 3.4 | – | – | 3.0 | – | – | – | – | 9.5 | 12.2 | 7.1 |
| Metroscopia/El País | 1 Jul 2010 | 501 | 20.0 | 30.9 | 5.8 | – | – | 2.8 | – | – | – | – | 14.0 | 12.4 | 10.9 |
| Obradoiro de Socioloxía/Público | 17 May–9 Jun 2010 | ? | 18.9 | 25.4 | 3.8 | 2.2 | 0.8 | 4.8 | 0.5 | 0.6 | – | – | – | – | 6.5 |
| Metroscopia/El País | 2 Jun 2010 | 506 | 17.0 | 27.7 | 5.3 | – | – | 4.9 | – | – | – | – | 13.1 | 17.8 | 10.7 |
| GESOP/El Periódico | 17–21 May 2010 | 1,500 | 23.7 | 31.1 | 5.4 | 2.1 | 0.7 | 4.2 | 0.9 | – | – | – | 13.0 | 10.1 | 7.4 |
| Obradoiro de Socioloxía/Público | 20 Apr–19 May 2010 | 4,002 | 19.9 | 24.7 | 4.3 | 1.9 | 0.6 | 4.3 | 0.7 | 0.4 | – | – | – | – | 4.8 |
| Metroscopia/El País | 13 May 2010 | 510 | 21.8 | 28.2 | 3.7 | – | – | 3.3 | – | – | – | – | 18.8 | 8.6 | 6.4 |
| Metroscopia/El País | 29 Apr 2010 | 512 | 25.2 | 26.6 | 5.5 | – | – | 3.1 | – | – | – | – | 11.4 | 12.9 | 1.4 |
| CIS | 6–14 Apr 2010 | 2,479 | 24.5 | 22.8 | 3.5 | 2.0 | 0.8 | 2.9 | 0.6 | 0.3 | 0.2 | – | 18.6 | 15.0 | 1.7 |
| Metroscopia/El País | 8 Apr 2010 | 515 | 25.5 | 26.7 | 6.8 | – | – | 3.1 | – | – | – | – | 9.6 | 14.4 | 1.2 |
| Metroscopia/El País | 3–4 Mar 2010 | 500 | 22.6 | 24.0 | 5.2 | – | – | 4.4 | – | – | – | – | 18.6 | 16.2 | 1.4 |
| Simple Lógica | 1–11 Feb 2010 | 1,007 | 20.5 | 25.8 | 4.1 | 1.3 | 0.3 | 3.0 | – | – | – | – | 17.3 | 23.4 | 5.3 |
| Metroscopia/El País | 3–4 Feb 2010 | 500 | 26.0 | 30.0 | 3.4 | – | – | 2.0 | – | – | – | – | 14.6 | 15.8 | 4.0 |
| Obradoiro de Socioloxía/Público | 11–27 Jan 2010 | 3,206 | 23.1 | 22.9 | 3.9 | 1.5 | 0.6 | 3.9 | 0.5 | 0.6 | – | – | – | – | 0.2 |
| CIS | 9–21 Jan 2010 | 2,477 | 24.6 | 25.3 | 4.2 | 1.8 | 1.0 | 4.2 | 1.1 | 0.3 | 0.3 | – | 17.5 | 12.8 | 0.7 |
| Metroscopia/El País | 7 Jan 2010 | 504 | 25.6 | 23.2 | 5.2 | – | – | – | – | – | – | – | 14.7 | 19.0 | 2.4 |
| ASEP | 1–31 Dec 2009 | 1,118 | 31.5 | 22.4 | 4.1 | 1.2 | 1.0 | 1.2 | 0.9 | 1.2 | 0.3 | – | 17.3 | 14.1 | 9.1 |
| DYM/ABC | 11–18 Dec 2009 | 1,038 | 20.4 | 21.8 | – | – | – | – | – | – | – | – | – | – | 1.4 |
| GESOP/El Periódico | 14–17 Dec 2009 | 1,500 | 27.2 | 31.5 | 5.0 | 2.3 | 1.1 | 4.2 | 0.8 | – | – | – | 9.6 | 11.1 | 4.3 |
| Metroscopia/El País | 2–3 Dec 2009 | 732 | 27.9 | 26.9 | 4.8 | – | – | – | – | – | – | – | 14.0 | 14.0 | 1.0 |
| Obradoiro de Socioloxía/Público | 9 Nov–2 Dec 2009 | 3,201 | 23.6 | 22.5 | 3.0 | 1.3 | 0.4 | 4.6 | 0.9 | 0.4 | – | – | – | – | 1.1 |
| ASEP | 1–30 Nov 2009 | 1,215 | 30.0 | 21.8 | 3.6 | 0.8 | 0.8 | 1.6 | 0.7 | 0.5 | – | – | 17.3 | 15.3 | 8.2 |
| Obradoiro de Socioloxía/Público | 13 Oct–4 Nov 2009 | 3,204 | 21.5 | 23.1 | 3.7 | 1.8 | 0.9 | 4.2 | 0.8 | 0.6 | – | – | – | – | 1.6 |
| ASEP | 1–31 Oct 2009 | 1,101 | 24.7 | 23.1 | 3.6 | 0.7 | 0.7 | 1.5 | 0.4 | – | – | – | 22.1 | 15.9 | 1.6 |
| Metroscopia/El País | 28–29 Oct 2009 | 501 | 26.9 | 25.0 | 4.8 | – | – | – | – | – | – | – | 14.4 | 16.8 | 1.9 |
| Simple Lógica | 15–21 Oct 2009 | 1,025 | 23.2 | 21.3 | 2.1 | 1.6 | 0.5 | – | – | – | – | – | 15.1 | 28.9 | 1.9 |
| Intercampo/GETS | 15 Sep–17 Oct 2009 | 1,739 | 24.5 | 20.9 | 3.4 | 1.1 | 0.7 | 1.3 | – | – | – | – | – | – | 3.6 |
| Metroscopia/El País | 15 Oct 2009 | 500 | 23.2 | 26.8 | 4.2 | – | – | – | – | – | – | – | 16.2 | 17.8 | 3.6 |
| CIS | 7–14 Oct 2009 | 2,478 | 23.2 | 25.7 | 3.5 | 2.9 | 1.1 | 3.6 | 1.1 | 0.5 | 0.2 | – | 19.0 | 13.6 | 2.5 |
| Obradoiro de Socioloxía/Público | 16 Sep–7 Oct 2009 | 3,202 | 22.9 | 25.3 | 2.9 | 1.9 | 0.6 | 3.6 | 0.5 | 0.5 | – | – | – | – | 2.4 |
| Metroscopia/El País | 30 Sep–1 Oct 2009 | 501 | 24.2 | 25.5 | 4.2 | – | – | – | – | – | – | – | 16.2 | 15.6 | 1.3 |
| ASEP | 1–30 Sep 2009 | 1,100 | 28.9 | 21.0 | 4.6 | 1.3 | 1.1 | 1.8 | 0.2 | 0.6 | 0.3 | – | 19.8 | 15.0 | 7.9 |
| ASEP | 1–31 Jul 2009 | 1,103 | 30.6 | 23.9 | 3.7 | 1.2 | 1.8 | 1.8 | 0.9 | 0.2 | 0.3 | – | 18.3 | 11.7 | 6.7 |
| CIS | 7–13 Jul 2009 | 2,482 | 28.4 | 23.9 | 3.4 | 2.2 | 1.0 | 2.9 | 1.0 | 0.4 | 0.2 | – | 16.0 | 14.3 | 4.5 |
| Metroscopia/El País | 8–9 Jul 2009 | 500 | 31.2 | 28.4 | 3.6 | – | – | – | – | – | – | – | 15.2 | 8.2 | 2.8 |
| ASEP | 1–30 Jun 2009 | 1,100 | 29.7 | 24.2 | 3.7 | 1.9 | 1.4 | 2.4 | 0.4 | 0.6 | 0.3 | – | 15.9 | 13.7 | 5.5 |
| Obradoiro de Socioloxía/Público | 25 May–17 Jun 2009 | 3,200 | 27.3 | 23.9 | 3.5 | 2.1 | 0.3 | 2.7 | 0.4 | 0.6 | – | – | – | – | 3.4 |
| Metroscopia/El País | 8–9 Jun 2009 | 500 | 31.6 | 27.6 | 2.8 | – | – | – | – | – | – | – | 14.6 | 9.2 | 4.0 |
| 2009 EP election | 7 Jun 2009 | —N/a | 17.8 | 19.2 | 1.7 | 1.3 | 0.6 | 1.3 | 0.6 | 0.3 | 0.3 | 0.4 | —N/a | 54.0 | 1.4 |
| ASEP | 1–30 May 2009 | 1,101 | 31.5 | 22.8 | 3.7 | 1.6 | 1.2 | 1.2 | 0.6 | 0.2 | 0.3 | – | 18.2 | 13.5 | 8.7 |
| Obradoiro de Socioloxía/Público | 27 Apr–20 May 2009 | 3,206 | 28.0 | 25.2 | 2.8 | 1.7 | 0.6 | 2.1 | 0.6 | 0.7 | – | – | – | – | 2.8 |
| GESOP/El Periódico | 11–15 May 2009 | 1,500 | 34.4 | 31.4 | 3.8 | 2.7 | 0.8 | 3.4 | 0.8 | – | – | – | 11.3 | 5.1 | 3.0 |
| ASEP | 1 Apr–1 May 2009 | 1,103 | 34.9 | 22.9 | 4.2 | 1.3 | 1.0 | 1.2 | 1.0 | 0.1 | 0.4 | – | 16.9 | 12.1 | 12.0 |
| Metroscopia/El País | 27–28 Apr 2009 | 505 | 29.3 | 26.1 | 4.8 | – | – | – | – | – | – | – | 18.3 | 11.5 | 3.2 |
| CIS | 14–21 Apr 2009 | 2,481 | 30.4 | 22.1 | 3.0 | 2.1 | 0.8 | 2.4 | 0.8 | 0.3 | 0.1 | – | 18.6 | 12.9 | 8.3 |
| ASEP | 1–31 Mar 2009 | 1,103 | 33.0 | 21.2 | 3.7 | 1.2 | 1.8 | 1.8 | 0.9 | 0.2 | 0.3 | – | 18.4 | 11.7 | 11.8 |
| Obradoiro de Socioloxía/Público | 25 Feb–18 Mar 2009 | 3,205 | 27.2 | 24.1 | 3.9 | 1.9 | 0.6 | 2.7 | 0.6 | 0.3 | – | – | – | – | 3.1 |
| ASEP | 23 Feb–1 Mar 2009 | 1,103 | 35.1 | 22.3 | 3.0 | 1.4 | 1.2 | 1.7 | 0.5 | 0.3 | 0.3 | – | 13.9 | 14.4 | 12.8 |
| Simple Lógica | 13–23 Feb 2009 | 1,012 | 28.6 | 18.1 | 3.3 | 1.8 | 0.3 | – | – | – | – | – | 18.7 | 21.5 | 10.5 |
| GESOP/El Periódico | 12–13 Feb 2009 | 800 | 36.6 | 25.1 | 4.5 | 1.9 | 0.9 | 3.9 | 1.3 | – | – | – | 11.5 | 7.0 | 11.5 |
| Metroscopia/El País | 22–27 Jan 2009 | 800 | 30.5 | 22.9 | 3.6 | – | – | 3.6 | – | – | – | – | – | – | 7.6 |
| Obradoiro de Socioloxía/Público | 10–20 Jan 2009 | 1,600 | 28.4 | 21.9 | 3.7 | 1.6 | 0.8 | 4.9 | 0.6 | 0.5 | – | – | – | – | 6.5 |
| CIS | 9–19 Jan 2009 | 2,482 | 29.3 | 23.0 | 3.5 | 2.0 | 0.8 | 2.5 | 1.1 | 0.4 | 0.3 | – | 18.6 | 12.6 | 6.3 |
| Obradoiro de Socioloxía/Público | 25 Nov–18 Dec 2008 | 3,198 | 27.1 | 20.9 | 3.5 | 1.2 | 0.6 | 2.7 | 0.8 | 0.6 | – | – | – | – | 6.2 |
| DYM/ABC | 13–20 Nov 2008 | 1,012 | 28.1 | 21.4 | – | – | – | – | – | – | – | – | – | – | 6.7 |
| Obradoiro de Socioloxía/Público | 27 Oct–20 Nov 2008 | 3,203 | 28.4 | 22.9 | 3.3 | 1.7 | 0.7 | 2.9 | 0.6 | 0.6 | – | – | – | – | 5.6 |
| GESOP/El Periódico | 20–24 Oct 2008 | 1,500 | 34.1 | 28.7 | 3.9 | 1.8 | 1.3 | 2.9 | 0.6 | – | – | – | 12.4 | 7.6 | 5.4 |
| Obradoiro de Socioloxía/Público | 29 Sep–23 Oct 2008 | 3,203 | 26.2 | 22.8 | 2.0 | 2.0 | 0.4 | 2.9 | 0.7 | 0.5 | – | – | – | – | 3.4 |
| CIS | 1–9 Oct 2008 | 2,481 | 30.8 | 23.8 | 3.6 | 2.5 | 0.7 | 2.1 | 0.9 | 0.4 | 0.2 | – | 17.9 | 11.6 | 7.0 |
| Intercampo/GETS | 17 Sep–8 Oct 2008 | 1,729 | 30.7 | 18.9 | 4.5 | 1.7 | 1.0 | 0.3 | 1.3 | – | – | – | – | – | 11.8 |
| Simple Lógica | 29 Sep–7 Oct 2008 | 1,006 | 24.0 | 20.8 | 4.4 | 1.8 | 0.5 | – | – | – | – | – | 23.2 | 17.9 | 3.2 |
| Obradoiro de Socioloxía/Público | 8–25 Sep 2008 | 3,171 | 27.9 | 26.3 | 3.4 | 1.9 | 0.8 | 2.4 | 0.6 | 0.8 | – | – | – | – | 1.6 |
| CIS | 7–13 Jul 2008 | 2,468 | 29.3 | 22.8 | 4.3 | 2.3 | 1.0 | 1.7 | 1.2 | 0.5 | 0.2 | – | 19.0 | 12.3 | 6.5 |
| Metroscopia/El País | 9–10 Jul 2008 | 703 | 34.0 | 28.0 | – | – | – | – | – | – | – | – | 12.6 | 8.5 | 6.0 |
| ASEP | 9–15 Jun 2008 | 1,206 | 34.8 | 22.1 | 3.8 | 1.7 | 1.5 | 1.0 | 0.6 | 1.1 | 0.2 | – | 17.5 | 10.5 | 12.7 |
| GESOP/El Periódico | 26–30 May 2008 | 1,500 | 41.5 | 25.2 | 4.5 | 1.7 | 1.2 | 2.5 | 0.9 | – | – | – | – | – | 16.3 |
| ASEP | 12–18 May 2008 | 1,210 | 39.6 | 22.4 | 4.2 | 1.1 | 1.6 | 0.7 | 0.7 | 0.8 | 0.2 | – | 13.0 | 10.7 | 17.2 |
| CIS | 24–30 Apr 2008 | 2,459 | 36.9 | 20.9 | 3.7 | 2.0 | 0.9 | 2.0 | 1.0 | 0.6 | 0.2 | – | 16.8 | 10.0 | 16.0 |
| ASEP | 14–20 Apr 2008 | 1,204 | 38.9 | 26.1 | 3.5 | 1.3 | 1.6 | 1.2 | 1.0 | 0.9 | 0.2 | – | 12.3 | 9.6 | 12.8 |
| 2008 general election | 9 Mar 2008 | —N/a | 32.7 | 30.0 | 2.8 | 2.3 | 0.9 | 0.9 | 0.9 | 0.6 | 0.5 | – | —N/a | 24.7 | 2.7 |

==== Victory preference ====
The table below lists opinion polling on the victory preferences for each party in the event of a general election taking place.

| Polling firm/Commissioner | Fieldwork date | Sample size | PSOE | PP | IU–LV | CiU | PNV | UPyD | ERC | Other/ None | Question | Lead |
|---|---|---|---|---|---|---|---|---|---|---|---|---|
| Opinión 2000/Cadena SER | 9–10 Nov 2011 | 1,000 | 30.5 | 42.3 | – | – | – | – | – | 17.5 | 9.7 | 11.8 |
| Noxa/La Vanguardia | 7–10 Nov 2011 | 1,275 | 27.0 | 42.0 | – | – | – | – | – | – | – | 15.0 |
| TNS Demoscopia/CEMOP | 2–7 Nov 2011 | 1,505 | 21.9 | 34.1 | – | – | – | – | – | 26.3 | 17.8 | 12.2 |
| CIS | 6–23 Oct 2011 | 17,236 | 21.7 | 33.5 | 5.3 | 1.9 | 0.4 | 2.6 | 0.6 | 35.2 | 19.4 | 11.8 |
| Intercampo/GETS | 15 Sep–17 Oct 2011 | 1,724 | 28.2 | 27.3 | 5.2 | 1.0 | 0.5 | 1.6 | 0.3 | 14.5 | 20.8 | 0.9 |
| Metroscopia/El País | 11–13 Oct 2011 | 1,500 | 30.0 | 44.0 | – | – | – | – | – | 22.0 | 4.0 | 14.0 |
| CEMOP | 26 Sep–4 Oct 2011 | 800 | 23.1 | 36.6 | – | – | – | – | – | 15.9 | 24.4 | 13.5 |
| Opinión 2000/Cadena SER | 7–8 Sep 2011 | 1,000 | 33.5 | 40.3 | – | – | – | – | – | 13.3 | 12.9 | 6.8 |
| Metroscopia/El País | 7–8 Sep 2011 | 1,002 | 34.0 | 39.0 | – | – | – | – | – | 25.0 | 2.0 | 5.0 |
| Metroscopia/El País | 27–28 Jul 2011 | 1,203 | 36.0 | 42.0 | – | – | – | – | – | 21.0 | 2.0 | 6.0 |
| CIS | 4–11 Jul 2011 | 2,475 | 30.4 | 31.6 | 4.1 | 1.4 | 0.6 | 3.3 | 0.6 | 5.2 | 22.7 | 1.2 |
| Metroscopia/El País | 29–30 Jun 2011 | 1,001 | 34.0 | 40.0 | – | – | – | – | – | 22.0 | 4.0 | 6.0 |
| Opinión 2000/Cadena SER | 20–21 Jun 2011 | 1,000 | 34.1 | 41.9 | – | – | – | – | – | 12.7 | 11.3 | 7.8 |
| Metroscopia/El País | 27–28 Apr 2011 | 1,200 | 39.0 | 42.0 | – | – | – | – | – | 16.0 | 3.0 | 3.0 |
| CIS | 1–8 Apr 2011 | 2,463 | 26.3 | 31.5 | 4.4 | 1.8 | 0.4 | 2.6 | 0.6 | 4.6 | 27.5 | 5.2 |
| Opinión 2000/Cadena SER | 6–7 Apr 2011 | 1,000 | 30.8 | 41.9 | – | – | – | – | – | 12.4 | 14.9 | 11.1 |
| Metroscopia/El País | 30–31 Mar 2011 | 1,004 | 36.0 | 42.0 | – | – | – | – | – | 19.0 | 3.0 | 6.0 |
| Metroscopia/El País | 2–3 Mar 2011 | 1,004 | 32.0 | 44.0 | – | – | – | – | – | 21.0 | 3.0 | 12.0 |
| Metroscopia/El País | 2–3 Feb 2011 | 1,005 | 34.0 | 43.0 | – | – | – | – | – | 20.0 | 3.0 | 9.0 |
| CIS | 7–16 Jan 2011 | 2,478 | 28.7 | 34.6 | 4.1 | 2.2 | 0.4 | 2.5 | 0.4 | 3.6 | 23.4 | 5.9 |
| Metroscopia/El País | 3–4 Jan 2011 | 1,023 | 37.0 | 38.0 | – | – | – | – | – | 21.0 | 4.0 | 1.0 |
| Metroscopia/El País | 1–2 Dec 2010 | 1,000 | 37.0 | 43.0 | – | – | – | – | – | 18.0 | 2.0 | 6.0 |
| Metroscopia/El País | 2–4 Nov 2010 | 1,000 | 42.0 | 36.0 | – | – | – | – | – | 19.0 | 3.0 | 6.0 |
| Opina/Cadena SER | 28–29 Oct 2010 | 1,000 | 41.0 | 40.9 | – | – | – | – | – | 8.6 | 9.5 | 0.1 |
| Noxa/La Vanguardia | 25–28 Oct 2010 | 1,000 | 34.0 | 39.0 | 6.0 | 1.0 | – | 4.0 | 0.4 | 8.0 | 9.0 | 5.0 |
| Opina/Cadena SER | 7–8 Oct 2010 | 1,000 | 34.4 | 41.7 | – | – | – | – | – | 12.8 | 11.1 | 7.3 |
| Metroscopia/El País | 30 Sep 2010 | 500 | 31.0 | 42.0 | – | – | – | – | – | 22.0 | 5.0 | 11.0 |
| Metroscopia/El País | 1–2 Sep 2010 | 500 | 41.0 | 39.0 | – | – | – | – | – | 18.0 | 2.0 | 3.0 |
| Opina/Cadena SER | 30–31 Aug 2010 | 1,000 | 36.8 | 39.5 | – | – | – | – | – | 12.6 | 11.1 | 2.7 |
| Metroscopia/El País | 28–29 Jul 2010 | 500 | 41.0 | 38.0 | – | – | – | – | – | 18.0 | 3.0 | 3.0 |
| Metroscopia/El País | 1 Jul 2010 | 501 | 35.0 | 44.0 | – | – | – | – | – | 17.0 | 4.0 | 9.0 |
| Metroscopia/El País | 2 Jun 2010 | 506 | 31.0 | 41.0 | – | – | – | – | – | 21.0 | 7.0 | 10.0 |
| CIS | 6–14 Apr 2010 | 2,479 | 33.1 | 28.6 | – | – | – | – | – | 21.1 | 17.2 | 4.5 |
| Noxa/La Vanguardia | 15–18 Sep 2008 | 1,000 | 40.0 | 35.0 | 5.0 | 1.0 | 1.0 | 4.0 | 1.0 | 7.0 | 6.0 | 5.0 |

==== Victory likelihood ====
The table below lists opinion polling on the perceived likelihood of victory for each party in the event of a general election taking place.

| Polling firm/Commissioner | Fieldwork date | Sample size | PSOE | PP | Other/ None | Question | Lead |
|---|---|---|---|---|---|---|---|
| Opinión 2000/Cadena SER | 9–10 Nov 2011 | 1,000 | 4.4 | 88.9 | 0.5 | 6.2 | 84.5 |
| GAD3/COPE | 2–10 Nov 2011 | 1,395 | 1.0 | 85.0 | – | – | 84.0 |
| TNS Demoscopia/CEMOP | 2–7 Nov 2011 | 1,505 | 3.9 | 88.8 | 0.5 | 6.8 | 84.9 |
| GAD3/COPE | 17–31 Oct 2011 | 1,200 | 5.0 | 84.0 | – | – | 79.0 |
| Metroscopia/El País | 24–27 Oct 2011 | 1,500 | 4.0 | 83.0 | – | 13.0 | 79.0 |
| CIS | 6–23 Oct 2011 | 17,236 | 4.2 | 82.1 | 0.8 | 12.9 | 77.9 |
| Intercampo/GETS | 15 Sep–17 Oct 2011 | 1,724 | 7.0 | 72.9 | 1.8 | 18.0 | 65.9 |
| Metroscopia/El País | 11–13 Oct 2011 | 1,500 | 4.0 | 87.0 | – | 9.0 | 83.0 |
| Noxa/La Vanguardia | 28 Sep–4 Oct 2011 | 1,272 | 7.0 | 87.0 | – | 6.0 | 80.0 |
| CEMOP | 26 Sep–4 Oct 2011 | 800 | 3.6 | 82.0 | 0.1 | 14.3 | 78.4 |
| NC Report/La Razón | 21–28 Sep 2011 | 1,000 | 22.4 | 55.5 | 9.8 | 12.3 | 33.1 |
| Opinión 2000/Cadena SER | 7–8 Sep 2011 | 1,000 | 8.2 | 81.8 | 0.5 | 9.5 | 73.6 |
| Metroscopia/El País | 7–8 Sep 2011 | 1,002 | 7.0 | 85.0 | – | 8.0 | 78.0 |
| GAD3/COPE | 5–6 Sep 2011 | 504 | 7.0 | 77.0 | – | – | 70.0 |
| Metroscopia/El País | 27–28 Jul 2011 | 1,203 | 8.0 | 84.0 | – | 8.0 | 76.0 |
| CIS | 4–11 Jul 2011 | 2,475 | 6.3 | 79.4 | 0.6 | 13.4 | 73.1 |
| GAD/COPE | 1–5 Jul 2011 | 504 | 5.0 | 78.0 | – | – | 73.0 |
| Metroscopia/El País | 29–30 Jun 2011 | 1,001 | 5.0 | 88.0 | – | 7.0 | 83.0 |
| Opinión 2000/Cadena SER | 20–21 Jun 2011 | 1,000 | 9.5 | 80.5 | 0.8 | 9.2 | 71.0 |
| GAD/COPE | 3–7 Jun 2011 | 501 | 5.0 | 80.0 | – | – | 75.0 |
| Metroscopia/El País | 27–28 Apr 2011 | 1,200 | 12.0 | 75.0 | – | 13.0 | 63.0 |
| CIS | 1–8 Apr 2011 | 2,463 | 9.3 | 71.6 | 0.4 | 18.7 | 62.3 |
| Opinión 2000/Cadena SER | 6–7 Apr 2011 | 1,000 | 10.4 | 72.4 | 0.1 | 17.1 | 62.0 |
| GAD/COPE | 1–5 Apr 2011 | 500 | 9.0 | 72.0 | – | – | 63.0 |
| Metroscopia/El País | 30–31 Mar 2011 | 1,004 | 11.0 | 78.0 | – | 11.0 | 67.0 |
| GAD/COPE | 7–9 Mar 2011 | 502 | 8.0 | 74.0 | – | – | 66.0 |
| Metroscopia/El País | 2–3 Mar 2011 | 1,004 | 9.0 | 81.0 | – | 10.0 | 72.0 |
| GAD/COPE | 7–8 Feb 2011 | 501 | 10.0 | 71.0 | – | – | 61.0 |
| Metroscopia/El País | 2–3 Feb 2011 | 1,005 | 11.0 | 77.0 | – | 12.0 | 66.0 |
| CIS | 7–16 Jan 2011 | 2,478 | 10.4 | 71.4 | 0.6 | 17.7 | 61.0 |
| GAD/COPE | 10–11 Jan 2011 | 500 | 10.0 | 64.0 | – | – | 54.0 |
| Metroscopia/El País | 3–4 Jan 2011 | 1,023 | 10.0 | 77.0 | – | 13.0 | 67.0 |
| GAD/COPE | 13–14 Dec 2010 | 500 | 10.0 | 71.0 | – | – | 61.0 |
| Metroscopia/El País | 1–2 Dec 2010 | 1,000 | 11.0 | 79.0 | – | 10.0 | 68.0 |
| GAD/COPE | 8–10 Nov 2010 | 503 | 12.0 | 66.0 | – | – | 54.0 |
| Metroscopia/El País | 2–4 Nov 2010 | 1,000 | 19.0 | 67.0 | – | 14.0 | 48.0 |
| Opina/Cadena SER | 28–29 Oct 2010 | 1,000 | 19.5 | 67.4 | 0.7 | 12.4 | 47.9 |
| Noxa/La Vanguardia | 25–28 Oct 2010 | 1,000 | 22.0 | 65.0 | 2.0 | 2.0 | 43.0 |
| GAD/COPE | 8–13 Oct 2010 | 501 | 12.0 | 66.0 | – | – | 54.0 |
| Opina/Cadena SER | 7–8 Oct 2010 | 1,000 | 15.1 | 70.5 | 1.7 | 12.7 | 55.4 |
| Metroscopia/El País | 30 Sep 2010 | 500 | 15.0 | 72.0 | – | 13.0 | 57.0 |
| GAD/COPE | 13–15 Sep 2010 | 500 | 14.0 | 61.0 | – | – | 47.0 |
| Metroscopia/El País | 1–2 Sep 2010 | 500 | 20.0 | 62.0 | – | 18.0 | 42.0 |
| Opina/Cadena SER | 30–31 Aug 2010 | 1,000 | 20.0 | 63.7 | 0.9 | 15.4 | 43.7 |
| Metroscopia/El País | 28–29 Jul 2010 | 500 | 21.0 | 60.0 | – | 19.0 | 39.0 |
| GAD/COPE | 5–7 Jul 2010 | 500 | 14.0 | 60.0 | – | – | 46.0 |
| Metroscopia/El País | 1 Jul 2010 | 501 | 16.0 | 69.0 | – | 15.0 | 53.0 |
| GAD/COPE | 7–9 Jun 2010 | 502 | 9.0 | 64.0 | – | – | 55.0 |
| Metroscopia/El País | 2 Jun 2010 | 506 | 13.0 | 70.0 | – | 17.0 | 57.0 |
| TNS Demoscopia/Antena 3 | 13 May 2010 | 1,000 | 19.8 | 63.9 | 4.0 | 12.3 | 44.1 |
| GAD/COPE | 10–12 May 2010 | 500 | 18.0 | 55.0 | – | – | 37.0 |
| Metroscopia/El País | 29 Apr 2010 | 512 | 21.0 | 62.0 | – | 17.0 | 41.0 |
| GAD/COPE | 12–14 Apr 2010 | ? | 13.0 | 56.0 | – | – | 43.0 |
| CIS | 6–14 Apr 2010 | 2,479 | 23.7 | 49.3 | 1.9 | 25.1 | 25.6 |
| Metroscopia/El País | 8 Apr 2010 | 515 | 28.0 | 56.0 | – | 16.0 | 28.0 |
| GAD/COPE | 8–11 Mar 2010 | 500 | 15.0 | 61.0 | – | – | 46.0 |
| Metroscopia/El País | 3–4 Mar 2010 | 500 | 18.0 | 62.0 | – | 20.0 | 44.0 |
| GAD/COPE | 3–10 Feb 2010 | 671 | 13.0 | 62.0 | – | – | 49.0 |
| Metroscopia/El País | 3–4 Feb 2010 | 500 | 23.0 | 62.0 | – | 16.0 | 39.0 |
| GAD/COPE | 15 Jan 2010 | ? | 19.0 | 47.0 | – | – | 28.0 |
| Metroscopia/El País | 7 Jan 2010 | 504 | 24.0 | 52.0 | – | 23.0 | 28.0 |
| Metroscopia/El País | 2–3 Dec 2009 | 732 | 30.0 | 53.0 | – | 18.0 | 23.0 |
| Metroscopia/El País | 28–29 Oct 2009 | 501 | 33.0 | 45.0 | – | 21.0 | 12.0 |
| Metroscopia/El País | 15 Oct 2009 | 500 | 27.0 | 45.0 | – | 28.0 | 18.0 |
| Metroscopia/El País | 30 Sep–1 Oct 2009 | 501 | 26.0 | 54.0 | – | 21.0 | 28.0 |
| Metroscopia/El País | 8–9 Jul 2009 | 500 | 32.0 | 44.0 | – | 24.0 | 12.0 |
| Metroscopia/El País | 8–9 Jun 2009 | 500 | 32.0 | 50.0 | – | 18.0 | 18.0 |

==== Hypothetical scenarios ====
PSOE candidates

| Polling firm/Commissioner | Fieldwork date | Sample size | Turnout | PSOE (José Luis Rodríguez Zapatero) | PSOE (Alfredo Pérez Rubalcaba) | PSOE (Carme Chacón) | PSOE (José Bono) | PP | IU | CiU | PNV | UPyD | ERC | Lead |
|---|---|---|---|---|---|---|---|---|---|---|---|---|---|---|
| NC Report/La Razón | 18–20 Apr 2011 | 1,000 | ? | – | – | 32.0 | – | 46.1 | – | – | – | – | – | 14.1 |
| NC Report/La Razón | 18–20 Apr 2011 | 1,000 | ? | – | 33.6 | – | – | 45.2 | – | – | – | – | – | 11.6 |
| Obradoiro de Socioloxía/Público | 11–19 Apr 2011 | 2,005 | ? | – | – | 40.6 | – | 39.7 | – | – | – | – | – | 0.9 |
| Obradoiro de Socioloxía/Público | 11–19 Apr 2011 | 2,005 | ? | – | 40.9 | – | – | 39.9 | – | – | – | – | – | 1.0 |
| TNS Demoscopia/Antena 3 | 7–12 Apr 2011 | 3,000 | ? | – | – | 31.1 | – | 45.4 | – | – | – | – | – | 14.3 |
| TNS Demoscopia/Antena 3 | 7–12 Apr 2011 | 3,000 | ? | – | 34.2 | – | – | 44.3 | – | – | – | – | – | 10.1 |
| Sigma Dos/El Mundo | 5–7 Apr 2011 | 1,000 | ? | – | – | – | 37.4 | 45.3 | 4.4 | 3.3 | 1.1 | 1.5 | 0.9 | 7.9 |
| Sigma Dos/El Mundo | 5–7 Apr 2011 | 1,000 | ? | – | – | 37.8 | – | 44.9 | 4.2 | 3.3 | 1.1 | 1.4 | 0.9 | 7.1 |
| Sigma Dos/El Mundo | 5–7 Apr 2011 | 1,000 | ? | – | 37.7 | – | – | 45.2 | 4.1 | 3.2 | 1.1 | 1.5 | 0.9 | 7.5 |
| Sigma Dos/El Mundo | 2–3 Feb 2011 | 1,000 | ? | – | 33.7 | – | – | 45.9 | 8.2 | 2.9 | 1.1 | 1.8 | 0.8 | 12.2 |
| Sigma Dos/El Mundo | 2–3 Feb 2011 | 1,000 | ? | 31.3 | – | – | – | 47.4 | 8.1 | 2.9 | 1.1 | 2.2 | 0.9 | 16.1 |
| Metroscopia/El País | 2–3 Feb 2011 | 1,005 | ? | – | 40.5 | – | – | 44.1 | – | – | – | – | – | 3.6 |
| Metroscopia/El País | 2–3 Feb 2011 | 1,005 | 70 | 28.4 | – | – | – | 43.3 | – | – | – | – | – | 14.9 |
