= Sub-national opinion polling for the April 2019 Spanish general election =

In the run up to the April 2019 Spanish general election, various organisations carried out opinion polling to gauge voting intention in autonomous communities and constituencies in Spain during the term of the 12th Cortes Generales. Results of such polls are displayed in this article. The date range for these opinion polls is from the previous general election, held on 26 June 2016, to the day the next election was held, on 28 April 2019.

Voting intention estimates refer mainly to a hypothetical Congress of Deputies election. Polls are listed in reverse chronological order, showing the most recent first and using the dates when the survey fieldwork was done, as opposed to the date of publication. Where the fieldwork dates are unknown, the date of publication is given instead. The highest percentage figure in each polling survey is displayed with its background shaded in the leading party's colour. If a tie ensues, this is applied to the figures with the highest percentages. The "Lead" columns on the right shows the percentage-point difference between the parties with the highest percentages in a given poll.

Refusals are generally excluded from the party vote percentages, while question wording and the treatment of "don't know" responses and those not intending to vote may vary between polling organisations. When available, seat projections are displayed below the percentages in a smaller font.

== Autonomous communities ==
=== Andalusia ===
Color key:

Poll conducted after legal ban on opinion polls

Polling firm/Commissioner	Fieldwork date	Sample size	Turnout	PP	PSOE	Unidas Podemos	Cs	PACMA	Vox	Lead
April 2019 general election	28 Apr 2019	—N/a	70.8	17.2; 11	34.2; 24	14.3; 9	17.7; 11	1.4; 0	13.4; 6	16.5
GAD3/RTVE–FORTA	12–27 Apr 2019	?	?	19.0; 11	33.0; 24	14.0; 6/7	16.0; 10	–	15.0; 9/10	14.0
Sigma Dos/El Mundo	3–17 Apr 2019	?	?	? 12/14	34.0; 24/25	13.0; 5/9	? 9/11	–	? 6/8	?
GAD3/Vocento	25 Mar–17 Apr 2019	1,200	?	20.0; 12	38.0; 28	10.0; 3	16.0; 10	–	13.0; 8	18.0
NC Report/La Razón	1–11 Apr 2019	?	?	24.2; 15/16	37.2; 28	11.8; 5/6	16.6; 10	–	7.4; 2	13.0
GAD3/Vocento	1–20 Mar 2019	1,200	?	23.8; 18	37.0; 27	10.2; 4	12.7; 7	–	11.7; 5	13.2
CIS	1–18 Mar 2019	2,755	?	? 10/12	? 26/28	? 6/9	? 8/9	–	? 7/8	?
2018 regional election	2 Dec 2018	—N/a	56.6	20.7 (13)	27.9 (18)	16.2 (11)	18.3 (12)	1.9 (0)	11.0 (7)	7.2
GAD3	19–30 Nov 2018	4,800	?	21.3	28.1	12.5	23.6	1.9	9.7	4.5
Deimos Estadística	19–23 Feb 2018	1,287	?	24.5; 18	31.3; 21	14.5; 9	22.9; 13	6.2; 0	–	6.8
2016 general election	26 Jun 2016	—N/a	66.0	33.5; 23	31.2; 20	18.6; 11	13.6; 7	1.2; 0	0.2; 0	2.3

=== Aragon ===
Color key:

Poll conducted after legal ban on opinion polls

Polling firm/Commissioner	Fieldwork date	Sample size	Turnout	PP	PSOE	Unidas Podemos	Cs	Vox	Lead
April 2019 general election	28 Apr 2019	—N/a	75.2	18.9; 3	31.7; 5	13.6; 1	20.5; 3	12.2; 1	11.2
GAD3/RTVE–FORTA	12–27 Apr 2019	?	?	17.0; 3	30.0; 5	16.0; 1	20.0; 3	15.0; 1	10.0
GAD3/Vocento	25 Mar–17 Apr 2019	?	?	? 3	? 7	? 1	? 1	? 1	?
A+M/Heraldo de Aragón	15–17 Apr 2019	1,600	71.5	26.0; 4	30.2; 4/6	12.4; 1	20.2; 2/4	8.5; 0/1	4.2
Sigma Dos/El Mundo	3–17 Apr 2019	?	?	? 3	33.0; 5/7	13.0; 1	? 1/3	? 1	?
NC Report/La Razón	1–11 Apr 2019	?	?	24.6; 4	28.5; 4/5	12.4; 1	18.6; 2/3	12.9; 1	3.9
GAD3/Vocento	1–20 Mar 2019	?	?	? 4	? 6	? 1	? 1	? 1	?
CIS	1–18 Mar 2019	814	?	? 4	? 4/5	? 1	? 2/3	? 1	?
2016 general election	26 Jun 2016	—N/a	69.9	35.8; 6	24.8; 4	19.7; 2	16.2; 1	0.3; 0	11.0

=== Asturias ===
Color key:

Poll conducted after legal ban on opinion polls

Polling firm/Commissioner	Fieldwork date	Sample size	Turnout	PP	PSOE	Unidas Podemos	Cs	Vox	Actúa	Lead
April 2019 general election	28 Apr 2019	—N/a	65.0	17.9; 1	33.1; 3	17.1; 1	16.7; 1	11.5; 1	0.7; 0	15.2
GAD3/RTVE–FORTA	12–27 Apr 2019	?	?	17.0; 1	30.0; 3	19.0; 1	15.0; 1	15.0; 1	–	11.0
Sigma Dos/El Mundo	3–17 Apr 2019	?	?	25.0; 2	31.0; 2	? 1	? 1	? 1	–	6.0
GAD3/Vocento	25 Mar–17 Apr 2019	?	?	21.0; 1/2	32.0; 2/3	14.0; 1	15.0; 1	13.0; 1	–	12.0
NC Report/La Razón	1–12 Apr 2019	?	?	26.9; 2	30.0; 3	16.2; 1	15.8; 1	8.9; 0	–	3.1
GAD3/Vocento	1–20 Mar 2019	400	?	22.0; 1/2	32.0; 2/3	12.0; 1	12.0; 1	11.0; 1	5.0; 0	10.0
CIS	1–18 Mar 2019	370	?	? 2	? 3	? 1	? 1	? 0	–	?
2016 general election	26 Jun 2016	—N/a	61.1	35.3; 3	24.9; 2	23.9; 2	12.6; 1	0.2; 0	–	10.4

=== Balearic Islands ===
Color key:

Poll conducted after legal ban on opinion polls

Polling firm/Commissioner	Fieldwork date	Sample size	Turnout	PP	Unidas Podemos	PSOE	Cs	PACMA	VP	Vox	El Pi	Lead
April 2019 general election	28 Apr 2019	—N/a	65.4	16.8; 1	17.8; 2	26.4; 3	17.4; 1	1.7; 0	4.9; 0	11.3; 1	2.3; 0	8.6
GAD3/RTVE–FORTA	12–27 Apr 2019	?	?	19.0; 2	23.0; 2	22.0; 2	14.0; 1	–	–	14.0; 1	–	1.0
IBES/Última Hora	21 Apr 2019	?	?	20.0; 2	15.0; 1	28.0; 2/3	17.0; 1/2	1.0; 0	5.0 (Note: Result for More for Mallorca.); 0	10.0; 1	3.0; 0	8.0
Sigma Dos/El Mundo	3–17 Apr 2019	?	?	17.0; 1	? 1	? 3	? 2	–	–	? 1	–	?
NC Report/La Razón	1–17 Apr 2019	?	?	26.0; 2/3	18.1; 1/2	26.5; 2/3	17.3; 1/2	–	–	6.8; 0	–	0.5
GAD3/Vocento	25 Mar–17 Apr 2019	?	?	? 2	? 1	? 3	? 1	–	–	? 1	–	?
GAD3/Vocento	1–20 Mar 2019	?	?	? 2	? 1	? 3	? 1	–	–	? 1	–	?
CIS	1–18 Mar 2019	370	?	? 1	? 1/2	? 2/3	? 1/2	–	–	? 1/2	–	?
IBES/Última Hora	8–13 Mar 2019	900	?	22.5; 2/3	14.4; 1	23.1; 2/3	15.1; 1	0.4; 0	5.9; 0	12.3; 1	3.0; 0	0.6
2016 general election	26 Jun 2016	—N/a	60.7	35.1; 3	25.4; 2	20.1; 2	14.6; 1	1.6; 0	(Note: Within UPM.)	–	–	9.7

=== Basque Country ===
Color key:

Poll conducted after legal ban on opinion polls

Polling firm/Commissioner	Fieldwork date	Sample size	Turnout	Unidas Podemos	PNV	PSE–EE	EH Bildu	PP	Cs	Vox	Lead
April 2019 general election	28 Apr 2019	—N/a	71.8	17.6; 4	31.0; 6	19.9; 4	16.7; 4	7.4; 0	3.2; 0	2.2; 0	11.1
GAD3/RTVE–FORTA	12–27 Apr 2019	?	?	19.0; 4	26.0; 6	22.0; 5/6	14.0; 2	9.0; 0/1	–	–	4.0
Gizaker/EITB	16–17 Apr 2019	1,200	?	22.0; 4/5	28.9; 6	17.8; 4	16.5; 2/3	9.4; 1	3.1; 0	1.1; 0	6.9
NC Report/La Razón	1–17 Apr 2019	?	?	? 4/5	? 6	? 3	? 2/3	? 2	4.9; 0	3.5; 0	?
GAD3/Vocento	25 Mar–17 Apr 2019	800	?	12.0; 3	31.0; 6	27.0; 5/6	12.0; 2	10.0; 1/2	3.0; 0	2.0; 0	4.0
Ikertalde/GPS	25–28 Mar 2019	1,500	67.5	18.3; 3	28.3; 6	20.4; 4	14.5; 3	9.3; 2	4.2; 0	2.4; 0	7.9
GAD3/Vocento	1–20 Mar 2019	800	?	17.0; 3	27.0; 6	21.0; 5	15.0; 2	9.0; 2	4.0; 0	3.0; 0	6.0
CIS	1–18 Mar 2019	1,052	?	? 3/4	? 6	? 5	? 3/4	? 0	? 0	? 0	?
Gizaker/EITB	1–5 Mar 2019	1,650	?	20.7; 4	28.5; 6	20.0; 4	15.6; 3	9.7; 1	3.6; 0	0.8; 0	7.8
2016 regional election	25 Sep 2016	—N/a	60.0	14.8 (3)	37.4 (7)	11.9 (2)	21.1 (4)	10.1 (2)	2.0 (0)	0.1 (0)	16.3
2016 general election	26 Jun 2016	—N/a	65.2	29.1; 6	24.9; 5	14.2; 3	13.3; 2	12.9; 2	3.5; 0	0.1; 0	4.2

=== Canary Islands ===
Color key:

Poll conducted after legal ban on opinion polls

Polling firm/Commissioner	Fieldwork date	Sample size	Turnout	PP	PSOE	Unidas Podemos	Cs	CC	Vox	Lead
April 2019 general election	28 Apr 2019	—N/a	62.5	15.5; 3	27.8; 5	15.7; 3	14.7; 2	13.0; 2	6.6; 0	12.1
GAD3/RTVE–FORTA	12–27 Apr 2019	?	?	20.0; 4	33.0; 5	14.0; 2	13.0; 2	7.0; 1	9.0; 1	13.0
Hamalgama Métrica/El Día	22 Apr 2019	?	62.5	23.5; 4	27.5; 5/6	16.3; 2/3	15.0; 2	5.5; 0/1	7.1; 0/1	4.0
Sigma Dos/El Mundo	3–17 Apr 2019	?	?	? 4	? 6	? 1/2	? 2/3	? 0/1	? 0/1	?
GAD3/Vocento	25 Mar–17 Apr 2019	?	?	? 4	? 6	? 1	? 2	? 1	? 1	?
NC Report/La Razón	1–13 Apr 2019	?	?	25.4; 5	28.5; 5	13.4; 2	14.8; 2	7.6; 1	7.0; 0	3.1
GAD3/Vocento	1–20 Mar 2019	?	?	? 4	? 7	? 1	? 2	? 1	? 0	?
CIS	1–18 Mar 2019	765	?	? 3	? 5/6	? 2	? 2/3	? 0/1	? 1/2	?
2016 general election	26 Jun 2016	—N/a	59.1	34.1; 6	22.5; 3	20.3; 3	12.0; 2	8.0; 1	0.1; 0	11.6

=== Cantabria ===
Color key:

Poll conducted after legal ban on opinion polls

Polling firm/Commissioner	Fieldwork date	Sample size	Turnout	PP	PSOE	Unidas Podemos	Cs	Vox	PRC	Lead
April 2019 general election	28 Apr 2019	—N/a	72.4	21.7; 1	25.2; 2	10.2; 0	15.1; 1	11.2; 0	14.6; 1	3.5
GAD3/RTVE–FORTA	12–27 Apr 2019	?	?	24.0; 1	28.0; 1	14.0; 1	17.0; 1	14.0; 1	–	4.0
PRC	6–20 Apr 2019	683	?	23.2; 1/2	25.1; 1/2	9.3; 0	12.2; 0/1	12.1; 0/1	16.9; 1	1.9
Sigma Dos/El Mundo	3–17 Apr 2019	?	?	22.0; 1	? 2	? 0/1	? 1	? 0/1	–	?
NC Report/La Razón	1–17 Apr 2019	?	?	27.6; 2	27.2; 2	11.0; 0	15.7; 1	7.4; 0	9.2; 0	0.4
GAD3/Vocento	25 Mar–17 Apr 2019	?	?	28.0; 2	30.0; 2	9.0; 0	14.0; 0/1	13.0; 0/1	6.0; 0	2.0
GAD3/Vocento	1–20 Mar 2019	400	?	25.0; 1	29.0; 2	10.0; 0	13.0; 1	13.0; 1	7.0; 0	4.0
CIS	1–18 Mar 2019	320	?	? 1/2	? 2/3	? 0	? 1	? 0	–	?
2016 general election	26 Jun 2016	—N/a	68.5	41.5; 2	23.5; 1	17.7; 1	14.4; 1	0.2; 0	–	18.0

=== Castile and León ===
Color key:

Poll conducted after legal ban on opinion polls

Polling firm/Commissioner	Fieldwork date	Sample size	Turnout	PP	PSOE	Unidas Podemos	Cs	Vox	Lead
April 2019 general election	28 Apr 2019	—N/a	72.9	26.0; 10	29.8; 12	10.4; 0	18.9; 8	12.3; 1	3.8
GAD3/RTVE–FORTA	12–27 Apr 2019	?	?	26.0; 11/12	28.0; 11/12	12.0; 1	16.0; 5	14.0; 2	2.0
SyM Consulting/La Nueva Crónica	15–17 Apr 2019	5,512	70.4	28.9; 13	26.5; 10	? 0	13.5; 2	15.9; 6	2.4
Sigma Dos/El Mundo	3–17 Apr 2019	?	?	28.0; 9/13	? 13/14	? 0/1	? 5/6	? 0/1	?
GAD3/Vocento	25 Mar–17 Apr 2019	1,000	?	29.0; 11/14	32.0; 12/15	8.0; 0	15.0; 4	12.0; 1	3.0
NC Report/La Razón	1–11 Apr 2019	?	?	31.5; 15/17	27.8; 11	10.0; 0	17.1; 3/5	10.8; 0	3.7
GAD3/Vocento	1–20 Mar 2019	600	?	30.0; 14/16	29.0; 12/13	9.0; 0	14.0; 2/3	14.0; 0/2	1.0
CIS	1–18 Mar 2019	2,053	?	? 10/12	? 12	? 0	? 3/6	? 3/4	?
2016 general election	26 Jun 2016	—N/a	68.8	44.3; 18	23.1; 9	15.6; 3	14.1; 1	0.2; 0	21.2

=== Castilla–La Mancha ===
Color key:

Poll conducted after legal ban on opinion polls

Polling firm/Commissioner	Fieldwork date	Sample size	Turnout	PP	PSOE	Unidas Podemos	Cs	Vox	Lead
April 2019 general election	28 Apr 2019	—N/a	76.6	22.7; 6	32.4; 9	10.2; 0	17.5; 4	15.3; 2	9.7
GAD3/RTVE–FORTA	12–27 Apr 2019	?	?	24.0; 5/6	30.0; 8	12.0; 1	14.0; 3/4	17.0; 3	6.0
Sigma Dos/El Mundo	3–17 Apr 2019	?	?	24.0; 6	? 8/9	? 0	? 4	16.0; 2/3	?
GAD3/Vocento	25 Mar–17 Apr 2019	?	?	? 7	? 8	? 0	? 3	? 3	?
NC Report/La Razón	1–11 Apr 2019	?	?	30.5; 7	32.4; 9/10	9.4; 0	15.6; 4	9.4; 0/1	1.9
SW Demoscopia/La Tribuna	2–5 Apr 2019	2,000	?	21.0; 5	36.1; 11	9.1; 0	14.1; 2	17.5; 3	15.1
GAD3/Vocento	1–20 Mar 2019	?	?	? 7/8	? 9	? 0	? 2	? 2/3	?
CIS	1–18 Mar 2019	1,115	?	? 5	? 9	? 0	? 2	? 4	?
2016 general election	26 Jun 2016	—N/a	71.8	42.7; 12	27.3; 7	14.7; 2	13.0; 0	0.2; 0	15.4

=== Catalonia ===
Color key:

Poll conducted after legal ban on opinion polls

Polling firm/Commissioner	Fieldwork date	Sample size	Turnout	ECP	ERC–Sobiranistes	PSC	PDeCAT	PP	Cs	PACMA	Vox	JxCat	FR	Lead
April 2019 general election	28 Apr 2019	—N/a	74.6	14.8; 7	24.6; 15	23.2; 12	(Note: Within JxCat.)	4.8; 1	11.6; 5	1.5; 0	3.6; 1	12.1; 7	2.7; 0	1.4
GAD3/TV3	12–27 Apr 2019	?	?	16.0; 8	21.0; 13/14	23.0; 12/13		7.0; 2	12.0; 5	–	6.0; 1	10.0; 5	4.0; 1	2.0
Sigma Dos/El Mundo	3–17 Apr 2019	?	?	15.0; 6/8	25.0; 15	26.0; 13/15		8.0; 2	12.0; 5	–	5.0; 1	8.0; 4	–	1.0
NC Report/La Razón	1–17 Apr 2019	?	?	? 9/10	? 13/14	? 10		? 4	? 5/6	–	? 1	? 4/5	–	?
GAD3/Vocento	25 Mar–17 Apr 2019	?	?	? 5	? 13	? 17		? 2	? 5	–	? 2	? 4	–	?
GESOP/El Periódico	8–12 Apr 2019	1,449	?	15.5; 7/8	23.6; 14/15	24.5; 13/14		5.3; 2	11.4; 4/5	–	4.7; 1/2	8.7; 4/5	3.1; 0/1	0.9
GAD3/La Vanguardia	9–11 Apr 2019	1,200	?	11.2; 5	24.5; 13/15	28.8; 16/18		6.2; 2/3	11.5; 4/6	–	4.4; 2	7.8; 3/4	–	4.3
GESOP/El Periódico	1–5 Apr 2019	654	?	13.7; 5/6	24.3; 14/15	25.8; 13/14		6.3; 2	10.0; 4/5	–	5.0; 1/2	8.5; 4/5	3.4; 0/1	1.5
Opinòmetre/CEO	4–25 Mar 2019	1,500	70	15.4; 7/9	24.5; 14/15	23.7; 11/13		5.9; 2	11.7; 5/6	–	–	12.1; 5/7	2.5; 0/1	0.8
Feedback/El Nacional	21–26 Mar 2019	800	71.1	10.7; 4	24.3; 14	23.2; 12/13		6.8; 2	13.2; 6/7	–	3.0; 1	12.3; 7	4.2; 1	1.1
GAD3/Vocento	1–20 Mar 2019	?	?	? 5	? 12	? 15		? 2	? 6	–	? 2	? 6	–	?
CIS	1–18 Mar 2019	1,886	?	? 5/7	? 17/18	? 12/14		? 1	? 4	? 0/1	? 3	? 4/5	–	?
Opinòmetre/CEO	22 Oct–12 Nov 2018	1,500	65	21.4; 10/11	26.5; 14/15	15.9; 7/8	11.6; 6	5.8; 1/2	15.9; 6/8	–	–	–	–	5.1
Opinòmetre/CEO	23 Jun–14 Jul 2018	1,500	68	18.2; 9	24.3; 13/14	20.2; 9	13.9; 7/8	6.9; 2	14.0; 6	–	–	–	–	4.1
GAD3/La Vanguardia	14–21 Jun 2018	800	?	16.1; 8	19.7; 11	23.8; 11	12.3; 7	11.0; 4	14.1; 6	–	–	–	–	4.1
Opinòmetre/CEO	7–27 Apr 2018	1,500	65	21.4; 10/11	20.2; 12	13.2; 5/6	16.4; 8/9	7.7; 2/3	18.0; 8	–	–	–	–	1.2
Apolda/CEO	10–30 Jan 2018	1,200	68	18.5; 8/10	22.4; 13	15.5; 6/7	15.0; 7/9	7.0; 2	18.6; 8/9	–	–	–	–	3.8
2017 regional election	21 Dec 2017	—N/a	79.1	7.5 (2)	21.4 (12)	13.9 (6)		4.2 (1)	25.4 (13)	0.9 (0)	–	21.7; 12	4.5; 1	3.7
GESOP/El Periódico	16–19 Oct 2017	800	?	21.5; 10/11	23.9; 14	16.3; 7/8	10.7; 5	11.2; 5	12.6; 5	–	–	–	–	2.4
GESOP/CEO	26 Jun–11 Jul 2017	1,500	68	23.9; 11/12	21.8; 12/13	16.6; 7/9	11.2; 6/7	12.5; 5/6	10.1; 3/5	–	–	–	–	2.1
GESOP/CEO	6–21 Mar 2017	1,500	65	23.8; 11/12	22.4; 12/14	15.0; 7	11.4; 5/6	12.2; 5	12.1; 4/5	–	–	–	–	1.4
DYM/CEO	12–17 Dec 2016	1,047	64	21.1; 10/11	23.7; 12/14	15.5; 7	12.7; 5/8	12.1; 4/6	11.7; 3/5	–	–	–	–	2.6
GESOP/El Periódico	12–14 Dec 2016	800	?	21.9; 10/11	21.1; 12/13	15.4; 7/8	11.5; 5/6	12.8; 5/6	11.5; 5	–	–	–	–	0.8
Opinòmetre/CEO	17 Oct–3 Nov 2016	1,500	64	24.9; 12/13	20.9; 12/13	14.0; 6/7	12.6; 6/8	12.9; 6	11.4; 3/5	–	–	–	–	4.0
Opinòmetre/CEO	28 Jun–13 Jul 2016	1,500	64	24.3; 11/12	20.0; 11/12	15.4; 7/8	13.1; 7/8	12.0; 5	11.2; 4/5	–	–	–	–	4.3
2016 general election	26 Jun 2016	—N/a	63.4	24.5; 12	18.2; 9	16.1; 7	13.9; 8	13.4; 6	10.9; 5	1.7; 0	0.0; 0	–	–	6.3

=== Extremadura ===
Color key:

Poll conducted after legal ban on opinion polls

Polling firm/Commissioner	Fieldwork date	Sample size	Turnout	PP	PSOE	Unidas Podemos	Cs	Vox	Lead
April 2019 general election	28 Apr 2019	—N/a	74.2	21.4; 2	38.1; 5	9.5; 0	18.0; 2	10.8; 1	17.4
GAD3/RTVE–FORTA	12–27 Apr 2019	?	?	21.0; 2	37.0; 5	–	15.0; 1	15.0; 2	16.0
Sigma Dos/El Mundo	3–17 Apr 2019	?	?	22.0; 2/3	40.0; 5	? 0	? 2	? 0/1	18.0
NC Report/La Razón	1–17 Apr 2019	?	?	28.8; 4	42.2; 5	8.6; 0	12.5; 1	6.2; 0	13.4
GAD3/Vocento	25 Mar–17 Apr 2019	400	?	26.0; 3	39.0; 5	6.0; 0	14.0; 0/1	15.0; 1/2	13.0
GAD3/Vocento	1–20 Mar 2019	400	?	29.0; 4	41.0; 5	8.0; 0	8.0; 0	12.0; 1	12.0
CIS	1–18 Mar 2019	479	?	? 3	? 5	? 0	? 2	? 0	?
2016 general election	26 Jun 2016	—N/a	68.6	39.9; 5	34.5; 4	13.1; 1	10.5; 0	0.2; 0	5.4

=== Galicia ===
Color key:

Poll conducted after legal ban on opinion polls

Polling firm/Commissioner	Fieldwork date	Sample size	Turnout	PP	PSdeG–PSOE	En Marea	Cs	BNG–Nós	Vox	EC	Lead
April 2019 general election	28 Apr 2019	—N/a	61.9	27.4; 9	32.1; 10	1.1; 0	11.2; 2	5.7; 0	5.3; 0	14.5; 2	4.7
GAD3/RTVE–FORTA	12–27 Apr 2019	?	?	27.0; 8	29.0; 9/10	–	12.0; 2	–	8.0; 1	16.0; 2/3	2.0
Infortécnica	21 Apr 2019	?	?	? 9/10	? 9/10	? 0/2	? 0/2	–	? 0/2	? 2	Tie
Sondaxe/La Voz de Galicia	18–21 Apr 2019	?	?	27.9; 9	30.4; 10	3.2; 0	12.7; 2	5.3; 0	6.4; 0	12.3; 2	2.5
Sondaxe/La Voz de Galicia	17–20 Apr 2019	?	?	28.1; 9	29.8; 10	3.4; 0	12.7; 2	5.8; 0	6.1; 0	11.9; 2	1.7
Sondaxe/La Voz de Galicia	16–19 Apr 2019	?	?	27.1; 9	30.7; 10	3.8; 0	11.9; 2	6.0; 0	6.5; 0	11.4; 2	3.6
Sondaxe/La Voz de Galicia	15–18 Apr 2019	?	?	26.8; 8	29.7; 10	4.8; 0	12.6; 2	5.6; 1	6.4; 0	10.6; 2	2.9
Sondaxe/La Voz de Galicia	14–17 Apr 2019	?	?	26.9; 9	30.5; 10	4.7; 0	11.7; 1	5.2; 0	6.7; 1	10.9; 2	3.6
Sigma Dos/El Mundo	3–17 Apr 2019	?	?	? 8/10	? 10	? 0	? 1/2	? 0/1	? 0	? 2	?
GAD3/Vocento	25 Mar–17 Apr 2019	?	?	? 9	? 10	? 0	? 2	? 0	? 0	? 2	?
Sondaxe/La Voz de Galicia	13–16 Apr 2019	?	?	26.7; 9	31.1; 10	5.6; 0	11.7; 2	5.0; 0	5.4; 0	10.7; 2	4.4
Sondaxe/La Voz de Galicia	12–15 Apr 2019	?	?	27.5; 10	31.4; 10	5.3; 0	11.0; 1	5.1; 0	5.5; 0	10.9; 2	3.9
NC Report/La Razón	1–15 Apr 2019	?	?	31.6; 9/10	28.6; 9/10	6.6; 0	10.7; 2	? 0	6.6; 0	9.6; 2	3.0
Sondaxe/La Voz de Galicia	11–14 Apr 2019	?	?	29.1; 10	31.6; 10	4.2; 0	10.3; 1	4.9; 0	6.1; 0	11.2; 2	2.5
Sondaxe/La Voz de Galicia	10–13 Apr 2019	?	?	30.8; 10	31.6; 10	4.2; 0	11.9; 1	5.0; 0	4.5; 0	9.7; 2	0.8
Sondaxe/La Voz de Galicia	9–12 Apr 2019	?	?	32.9; 10	29.7; 10	2.4; 0	11.5; 1	4.2; 0	4.9; 0	10.9; 2	3.2
GAD3/Vocento	1–20 Mar 2019	?	?	? 9	? 10	? 0	? 1	? 1	? 0	? 2	?
CIS	1–18 Mar 2019	1,098	?	? 8/9	? 9/10	? 0	? 2	? 0	? 1	? 2	?
Sondaxe/La Voz de Galicia	13–16 Mar 2019	603	?	29.2; 10	27.9; 8	17.5; 3	10.0; 2	5.9; 0	–	–	1.3
Sondaxe/La Voz de Galicia	13–21 Feb 2019	500	?	34.1; 11	27.0; 7	17.7; 3	10.1; 2	6.2; 0	–	–	7.1
Sondaxe/La Voz de Galicia	8 Jul 2018	1,000	62.0	35.9	24.9	17.5	13.6	3.4	–	–	11.0
Sondaxe/La Voz de Galicia	27 May 2018	1,000	?	34.2	20.1	21.5	15.6	3.8	–	–	12.7
Sondaxe/La Voz de Galicia	11 Mar 2018	1,000	?	36.9	19.8	23.0	12.6	4.1	–	–	13.9
Sondaxe/La Voz de Galicia	14 Feb 2018	?	?	39.0	21.4	19.3	12.5	3.9	–	–	17.6
Sondaxe/La Voz de Galicia	24 Nov–1 Dec 2017	500	?	39.0	21.2	20.7	12.2	2.7	–	–	17.8
Sondaxe/La Voz de Galicia	7–13 Jun 2017	855	?	41.7	23.2	19.6	8.3	4.0	–	–	18.5
Sondaxe/La Voz de Galicia	6 Mar 2017	?	?	41.5	19.0	24.1	7.4	3.9	–	–	17.4
2016 regional election	25 Sep 2016	—N/a	53.6	47.6 (15)	17.9 (4)	19.1 (4)	3.4 (0)	8.3 (0)	–	–	28.5
2016 general election	26 Jun 2016	—N/a	58.8	41.5; 12	22.2; 6	22.2; 5	8.6; 0	2.9; 0	0.1; 0	–	19.3

=== La Rioja ===
Color key:

Poll conducted after legal ban on opinion polls

Polling firm/Commissioner	Fieldwork date	Sample size	Turnout	PP	PSOE	Unidas Podemos	Cs	Vox	PR+	Lead
April 2019 general election	28 Apr 2019	—N/a	73.4	26.5; 1	31.7; 2	11.8; 0	17.8; 1	9.0; 0	1.2; 0	5.2
GAD3/RTVE–FORTA	12–27 Apr 2019	?	?	29.0; 1	30.0; 2	–	15.0; 1	–	–	1.0
Sigma Dos/El Mundo	3–17 Apr 2019	?	?	? 1	? 2	? 0	? 1	? 0	–	?
GAD3/Vocento	25 Mar–17 Apr 2019	400	?	32.0; 2	36.0; 2	9.0; 0	14.0; 0	18.0; 0	–	4.0
NC Report/La Razón	1–15 Apr 2019	?	?	30.1; 1/2	29.1; 1/2	10.1; 0	16.5; 1	7.7; 0	3.9; 0	1.0
GAD3/Vocento	1–20 Mar 2019	400	?	29.0; 2	31.0; 2	10.0; 0	14.0; 0	12.0; 0	–	2.0
CIS	1–18 Mar 2019	256	?	? 1	? 2	? 1	? 0	? 0	–	?
NueveCuatroUno	18 Feb 2019	1,050	?	30.7; 2	28.2; 1	12.1; 0	14.6; 1	9.8; 0	3.7; 0	2.5
2016 general election	26 Jun 2016	—N/a	70.6	42.6; 2	24.3; 1	16.6; 1	14.0; 0	0.2; 0	–	18.3

=== Madrid ===
Color key:

Poll conducted after legal ban on opinion polls

Polling firm/Commissioner	Fieldwork date	Sample size	Turnout	PP	Unidas Podemos	PSOE	Cs	Vox	Lead
April 2019 general election	28 Apr 2019	—N/a	75.5	18.6; 7	16.2; 6	27.3; 11	20.9; 8	13.9; 5	6.4
GAD3/RTVE–FORTA	12–27 Apr 2019	?	?	22.0; 8	17.0; 6/7	26.0; 10	19.0; 6	14.0; 5/6	4.0
Sigma Dos/El Mundo	3–17 Apr 2019	?	?	22.0; 8/9	14.0; 5/6	28.0; 11	20.0; 7/8	12.0; 4/5	6.0
GAD3/Vocento	25 Mar–17 Apr 2019	?	?	? 9	? 5	? 11	? 7	? 5	?
NC Report/La Razón	1–11 Apr 2019	?	?	25.7; 10	12.8; 5	22.0; 8/9	20.1; 7/8	17.4; 6	3.7
GAD3/Vocento	1–20 Mar 2019	?	?	? 10/11	? 4	? 11/12	? 7	? 4	?
CIS	1–18 Mar 2019	730	?	? 8/9	? 6/7	? 12/13	? 7	? 3/4	?
Invymark/Telemadrid	15 Feb 2019	800	?	27.5; 10	14.3; 5	20.6; 8	23.6; 9	11.8; 4	3.9
2016 general election	26 Jun 2016	—N/a	70.8	38.2; 15	21.3; 8	19.6; 7	17.8; 6	0.5; 0	16.9

=== Murcia ===
Color key:

Poll conducted after legal ban on opinion polls

Polling firm/Commissioner	Fieldwork date	Sample size	Turnout	PP	PSOE	Cs	Unidas Podemos	Vox	Somos Región	Lead
April 2019 general election	28 Apr 2019	—N/a	73.5	23.4; 2	24.8; 3	19.5; 2	10.4; 1	18.6; 2	0.6; 0	1.4
GAD3/RTVE–FORTA	12–27 Apr 2019	?	?	24.0; 2/3	24.0; 2/3	18.0; 2	12.0; 1	20.0; 2	–	Tie
Sigma Dos/El Mundo	3–17 Apr 2019	?	?	26.0; 3	? 2/3	20.0; 2	? 1	17.0; 1/2	–	?
GAD3/Vocento	25 Mar–17 Apr 2019	500	?	26.0; 3	24.0; 2	16.0; 2	9.0; 1	19.0; 2	–	2.0
NC Report/La Razón	1–11 Apr 2019	?	?	32.4; 3/4	23.0; 2/3	18.6; 2	9.6; 1	13.9; 1	–	9.4
GAD3/Vocento	1–20 Mar 2019	400	?	29.0; 3	26.0; 3	14.0; 1	7.0; 1	16.0; 2	3.0; 0	3.0
CIS	1–18 Mar 2019	434	?	? 3	? 2/3	? 1/2	? 1	? 2	–	?
2016 general election	26 Jun 2016	—N/a	69.6	46.7; 5	20.3; 2	15.7; 2	14.5; 1	0.4; 0	–	26.4

=== Navarre ===
Color key:

Poll conducted after legal ban on opinion polls

Polling firm/Commissioner	Fieldwork date	Sample size	Turnout	PP	Unidas Podemos	PSOE	EH Bildu	Cs	GBai	UPN	NA+	Vox	Lead
April 2019 general election	28 Apr 2019	—N/a	72.5	(Note: Within NA+.)	18.6; 1	25.8; 2	12.7; 0		6.1; 0		29.3; 2	4.8; 0	3.4
eldiarionorte.es	28 Apr 2019	?	?		18.0; 1	23.4; 2	10.1; 0		5.0; 0		29.3; 2	10.6; 0	5.9
GAD3/RTVE–FORTA	12–27 Apr 2019	?	?		20.0; 1	28.0; 2	9.0; 0		–		29.0; 2	? 0	1.0
eldiarionorte.es	20 Apr 2019	?	?		18.8; 1	19.5; 2	8.4; 0		3.5; 0		25.6; 2	6.6; 0	6.1
GAD3/Vocento	25 Mar–17 Apr 2019	?	?		? 1	? 2	? 0		–		? 2	? 0	?
CIES/Diario de Navarra	8–15 Apr 2019	800	71		15.9; 1	25.7; 2	10.7; 0		7.6; 0		35.1; 2	2.8; 0	9.4
NC Report/La Razón	1–12 Apr 2019	?	?		18.3; 1	22.0; 2	9.6; 0		6.6; 0		30.5; 2	8.6; 0	8.5
eldiarionorte.es	11 Apr 2019	?	?		18.9; 1	19.5; 2	8.5; 0		3.6; 0		20.1; 2	6.2; 0	0.6
GAD3/Vocento	1–20 Mar 2019	?	?		? 1	? 2	? 0		–		? 2	? 0	?
CIS	1–18 Mar 2019	256	?		? 1	? 2	? 0/1		–		? 1/2	? 0	?
2016 general election	26 Jun 2016	—N/a	67.4	31.9; 2	28.3; 2	17.4; 1	9.4; 0	6.1; 0	4.3; 0	(Note: Within PP.)	–	–	3.6

=== Valencian Community ===
Polling firm/Commissioner	Fieldwork date	Sample size	Turnout	PP	ALV	PSOE	Cs	PACMA	Vox	Unidas Podemos	Compromís	Lead
April 2019 general election	28 Apr 2019	—N/a	74.3	18.6; 7	–	27.8; 10	18.0; 6	1.4; 0	12.0; 3	14.2; 5	6.5; 1	9.1
Sigma Dos/El Mundo	3–17 Apr 2019	?	?	21.0; 7/8	–	? 11	? 5	–	? 3/5	? 3/4	? 1	?
NC Report/La Razón	1–17 Apr 2019	?	?	25.6; 10	–	25.3; 9	17.6; 6	–	8.9; 2	7.9; 2	10.7; 3	0.3
GAD3/Vocento	25 Mar–17 Apr 2019	1,100	?	23.0; 9	–	32.0; 12/13	15.0; 4	–	11.0; 3	11.0; 2/3	6.0; 1	9.0
IMOP/El Confidencial	17 Mar–14 Apr 2019	617	71.0	20.3; 7	–	28.5; 10	17.8; 7	–	12.5; 3	11.5; 3	5.6; 2	8.2
SyM Consulting/Valencia Plaza	4–5 Apr 2019	1,404	?	21.8; 8	–	27.7; 10	10.5; 2/3	–	14.9; 4/5	12.5; 3/4	8.2; 2/3	5.9
GAD3/Vocento	1–20 Mar 2019	?	?	23.0; 9	–	27.0; 10	15.0; 5	–	12.0; 4	11.0; 3	6.0; 1	4.0
CIS	1–18 Mar 2019	1,245	?	? 6/7	–	? 11/13	? 5/6	? 0/1	? 3/5	? 3	? 1/2	?
SyM Consulting/Valencia Plaza	21–23 Feb 2019	1,443	73.3	23.5; 9	–	23.4; 7/10	13.7; 3/4	–	16.4; 5/6	12.6; 3/4	7.7; 2	0.1
Invest Group/Levante-EMV	20–27 Sep 2016	750	?	40.3; 13/14	23.3; 8	25.3; 8/9	8.7; 3	–	–	(Note: Within ALV.)		15.0
2016 general election	26 Jun 2016	—N/a	72.4	35.4; 13	25.4; 9	20.8; 6	15.0; 5	1.3; 0	0.2; 0			10.0

== Constituencies ==
=== A Coruña ===
Polling firm/Commissioner	Fieldwork date	Sample size	Turnout	PP	En Marea	PSdeG–PSOE	Cs	BNG	Vox	EC	Lead
April 2019 general election	28 Apr 2019	—N/a	63.1	25.5; 3	1.0; 0	31.4; 3	12.1; 1	6.7; 0	5.6; 0	14.8; 1	5.9
Sondaxe/La Voz de Galicia	14–17 Apr 2019	?	?	24.0; 2	5.0; 0	27.0; 3	14.0; 1	7.0; 0	8.0; 1	10.0; 1	3.0
GAD3/Vocento	25 Mar–17 Apr 2019	?	?	? 3	–	? 3	? 1	–	–	? 1	Tie
Sondaxe/La Voz de Galicia	13–16 Apr 2019	?	?	23.0; 3	5.0; 0	29.0; 3	14.0; 1	8.0; 0	6.0; 0	10.0; 1	6.0
Sondaxe/La Voz de Galicia	12–15 Apr 2019	?	?	23.0; 3	4.0; 0	31.0; 3	14.0; 1	7.0; 0	6.0; 0	11.0; 1	8.0
NC Report/La Razón	1–15 Apr 2019	?	?	30.3; 3	6.9; 0	28.0; 3	11.5; 1	? 0	6.4; 0	10.2; 1	2.3
Sondaxe/La Voz de Galicia	11–14 Apr 2019	?	?	24.9; 3	3.2; 0	31.5; 3	14.4; 1	6.2; 0	5.7; 0	12.2; 1	6.6
Sondaxe/La Voz de Galicia	10–13 Apr 2019	?	?	28.0; 3	3.0; 0	31.0; 3	17.0; 1	5.0; 0	3.0; 0	12.0; 1	3.0
Sondaxe/La Voz de Galicia	9–12 Apr 2019	?	?	31.0; 3	2.0; 0	29.0; 3	14.0; 1	3.0; 0	3.0; 0	13.0; 1	2.0
GAD3/Vocento	1–20 Mar 2019	?	?	? 3	–	? 3	? 1	–	–	? 1	?
CIS	1–18 Mar 2019	310	?	? 2/3	–	? 2/3	? 1	–	? 1	? 1	Tie
Sondaxe/La Voz de Galicia	13–16 Mar 2019	?	?	27.8; 3	17.7; 1	31.4; 3	10.6; 1	–	4.4; 0	–	3.6
Sondaxe/La Voz de Galicia	13–21 Feb 2019	?	?	26.2; 3	18.8; 1	28.9; 3	14.7; 1	–	–	–	2.7
2016 regional election	25 Sep 2016	—N/a	54.0	47.8 (5)	19.4 (2)	17.2 (1)	3.3 (0)	8.8 (0)	–	–	28.4
2016 general election	26 Jun 2016	—N/a	59.9	40.1; 4	23.1; 2	21.8; 2	9.4; 0	3.0; 0	0.2; 0	–	17.0

=== Álava ===
Polling firm/Commissioner	Fieldwork date	Sample size	Turnout	Unidas Podemos	PP	PNV	PSE–EE	EH Bildu	Cs	Vox	Lead
April 2019 general election	28 Apr 2019	—N/a	69.5	17.7; 1	13.7; 0	22.7; 1	22.4; 1	14.0; 1	4.0; 0	3.2; 0	0.3
Gizaker/EITB	16–17 Apr 2019	400	?	23.0; 1	16.7; 1	20.9; 1	19.3; 1	12.4; 0	3.9; 0	2.4; 0	2.1
NC Report/La Razón	1–17 Apr 2019	?	?	? 1	14.2; 1	? 1	19.4; 1	? 0	? 0	? 0	?
GAD3/Vocento	25 Mar–17 Apr 2019	?	?	15.0; 1	14.0; 0/1	23.0; 1	28.0; 1/2	10.0; 0	4.0; 0	3.0; 0	5.0
Ikertalde/GPS	25–28 Mar 2019	400	65.5	19.6; 1	15.3; 1	20.1; 1	22.1; 1	11.3; 0	5.3; 0	3.3; 0	2.0
GAD3/Vocento	1–20 Mar 2019	?	?	20.0; 1	14.0; 1	17.0; 1	23.0; 1	11.0; 0	5.0; 0	5.0; 0	3.0
CIS	1–18 Mar 2019	308	?	? 1	? 0	? 1	? 2	? 0	? 0	? 0	?
Gizaker/EITB	1–5 Mar 2019	450	?	21.8; 1	18.0; 1	20.3; 1	20.1; 1	10.8; 0	5.0; 0	2.6; 0	1.5
2016 regional election	25 Sep 2016	—N/a	59.7	16.1 (1)	18.5 (1)	28.0 (1)	12.9 (0)	17.8 (1)	3.2 (0)	0.5 (0)	9.5
2016 general election	26 Jun 2016	—N/a	65.2	30.9; 1	20.4; 1	15.9; 1	15.7; 1	9.5; 0	5.0; 0	0.2; 0	10.5

=== Albacete ===
Polling firm/Commissioner	Fieldwork date	Sample size	Turnout	PP	PSOE	Unidas Podemos	Cs	Vox	Lead
April 2019 general election	28 Apr 2019	—N/a	76.5	22.1; 1	32.0; 2	10.6; 0	18.7; 1	14.5; 0	9.9
GAD3/Vocento	25 Mar–17 Apr 2019	?	?	? 1	? 1	? 0	? 1	? 1	Tie
NC Report/La Razón	1–11 Apr 2019	?	?	29.5; 1	32.3; 2	10.0; 0	17.5; 1	7.8; 0	2.8
SW Demoscopia/La Tribuna	2–5 Apr 2019	400	?	21.1; 1	34.4; 2	11.3; 0	13.9; 0	17.2; 1	13.3
GAD3/Vocento	1–20 Mar 2019	?	?	? 1/2	? 2	? 0	? 0	? 0/1	?
CIS	1–18 Mar 2019	255	?	? 1	? 2	? 0	? 1	? 0	?
2016 general election	26 Jun 2016	—N/a	71.5	40.9; 2	27.2; 1	15.3; 1	14.6; 0	–	13.7

=== Alicante ===
Polling firm/Commissioner	Fieldwork date	Sample size	Turnout	PP	ALV	PSOE	Cs	Vox	Unidas Podemos	Compromís	Lead
April 2019 general election	28 Apr 2019	—N/a	72.9	19.5; 3	–	28.3; 4	19.4; 2	12.6; 1	13.9; 2	3.4; 0	8.8
NC Report/La Razón	1–17 Apr 2019	?	?	27.7; 4	–	25.9; 3	18.2; 2	8.9; 1	7.0; 1	9.2; 1	1.8
GAD3/Vocento	25 Mar–17 Apr 2019	?	?	? 3	–	? 5	? 2	? 1	? 1	? 0	?
SyM Consulting/Valencia Plaza	4–5 Apr 2019	?	?	27.9; 4	–	25.4; 3	7.9; 1	12.1; 1/2	9.7; 1	13.7; 1/2	2.5
GAD3/Vocento	1–20 Mar 2019	?	?	24.0; 3	–	27.0; 4	? 2	? 2	? 1	? 0	3.0
CIS	1–18 Mar 2019	469	?	? 2/3	–	? 4/5	? 2	? 2	? 1	? 0	?
SyM Consulting/Valencia Plaza	21–23 Feb 2019	?	?	28.0; 4	–	25.1; 3/4	11.3; 1	10.4; 1	13.4; 1/2	8.9; 1	2.9
2016 general election	26 Jun 2016	—N/a	70.4	37.7; 5	22.1; 3	21.4; 2	15.8; 2	0.2; 0			15.6

=== Almería ===
Polling firm/Commissioner	Fieldwork date	Sample size	Turnout	PP	PSOE	Cs	Unidas Podemos	Vox	Lead
April 2019 general election	28 Apr 2019	—N/a	66.1	22.5; 2	30.2; 2	17.1; 1	8.8; 0	19.1; 1	7.7
GAD3/Vocento	25 Mar–17 Apr 2019	?	?	27.0; 2	36.0; 3	11.0; 0	5.0; 0	19.0; 1	9.0
NC Report/La Razón	1–11 Apr 2019	?	?	31.9; 2	34.5; 3	16.8; 1	8.9; 0	5.6; 0	2.6
GAD3/Vocento	1–20 Mar 2019	?	?	29.0; 2	32.0; 2	13.0; 1	8.0; 0	14.0; 1	3.0
CIS	1–18 Mar 2019	260	?	? 1/2	? 3	? 0/1	? 0/1	? 1	?
2018 regional election	2 Dec 2018	—N/a	52.8	27.2 (2)	25.9 (2)	16.3 (1)	9.7 (0)	16.8 (1)	1.3
2016 general election	26 Jun 2016	—N/a	62.9	43.0; 3	27.7; 2	13.7; 1	13.2; 0	0.1; 0	15.3

=== Ávila ===
Polling firm/Commissioner	Fieldwork date	Sample size	Turnout	PP	PSOE	Cs	Unidas Podemos	Vox	Lead
April 2019 general election	28 Apr 2019	—N/a	75.5	31.3; 1	26.0; 1	18.7; 1	7.6; 0	14.3; 0	5.3
SyM Consulting/La Nueva Crónica	15–17 Apr 2019	?	?	? 2	? 0	? 0	? 0	? 1	?
GAD3/Vocento	25 Mar–17 Apr 2019	?	?	29.0; 1	30.0; 1	17.0; 1	6.0; 0	13.0; 0	1.0
NC Report/La Razón	1–11 Apr 2019	?	?	38.0; 2	24.1; 1	17.5; 0	8.1; 0	10.0; 0	13.9
GAD3/Vocento	1–20 Mar 2019	?	?	36.0; 2	25.0; 1	13.0; 0	7.0; 0	16.0; 0	11.0
CIS	1–18 Mar 2019	202	?	? 1/2	? 1	? 0	? 0	? 0/1	?
2016 general election	26 Jun 2016	—N/a	71.9	51.5; 2	19.5; 1	14.3; 0	12.7; 0	–	32.0

=== Badajoz ===
Polling firm/Commissioner	Fieldwork date	Sample size	Turnout	PP	PSOE	Unidas Podemos	Cs	Vox	Lead
April 2019 general election	28 Apr 2019	—N/a	74.7	20.4; 1	38.5; 3	9.4; 0	18.5; 1	11.0; 1	18.1
NC Report/La Razón	1–17 Apr 2019	?	?	28.7; 2	42.8; 3	8.2; 0	12.6; 1	6.0; 0	14.1
GAD3/Vocento	25 Mar–17 Apr 2019	?	?	27.0; 2	40.0; 3	5.0; 0	14.0; 0/1	12.0; 0/1	13.0
GAD3/Vocento	1–20 Mar 2019	?	?	28.0; 2	42.0; 3	7.0; 0	8.0; 0	12.0; 1	14.0
CIS	1–18 Mar 2019	260	?	? 2	? 3	? 0	? 1	? 0	?
2016 general election	26 Jun 2016	—N/a	68.6	39.6; 3	35.3; 2	12.5; 1	10.7; 0	0.2; 0	4.3

=== Barcelona ===
Polling firm/Commissioner	Fieldwork date	Sample size	Turnout	ECP	PSC	ERC–Sobiranistes	PP	PDeCAT	Cs	PACMA	JxCat	FR	Vox	Lead
April 2019 general election	28 Apr 2019	—N/a	75.0	16.3; 6	24.7; 9	23.0; 8	5.0; 1		12.0; 4	1.6; 0	10.2; 3	2.7; 0	3.6; 1	1.7
NC Report/La Razón	1–17 Apr 2019	?	?	? 7	? 7	? 7	? 3		? 5	–	7.4; 2	–	4.2; 1	Tie
GAD3/Vocento	25 Mar–17 Apr 2019	?	?	? 4	? 11	? 7	? 2		? 4	–	? 2	–	? 2	?
GAD3/La Vanguardia	9–11 Apr 2019	?	?	? 4	? 11	? 7/8	? 2		? 3/4	–	? 2	–	? 2	?
Feedback/El Nacional	21–26 Mar 2019	?	?	11.5; 4	24.5; 8/9	23.2; 8	7.0; 2		13.7; 4/5	–	10.8; 3	4.1; 1	3.1; 1	1.3
GAD3/Vocento	1–20 Mar 2019	?	?	? 4	? 10	? 6	? 2		? 5	–	? 3	–	? 2	?
CIS	1–18 Mar 2019	847	?	? 5/6	? 8/9	? 9/10	? 1		? 3	? 0/1	? 2/3	–	? 3	?
2017 regional election	21 Dec 2017	—N/a	79.3	8.4 (2)	15.1 (5)	20.6 (7)	4.3 (1)		26.4 (9)	1.0 (0)	19.0 (6)	4.4 (1)	–	5.8
2016 general election	26 Jun 2016	—N/a	64.4	26.3; 9	16.8; 5	16.6; 5	13.5; 4	12.2; 4	11.5; 4	1.8; 0	–	–	–	9.5

=== Biscay ===
Polling firm/Commissioner	Fieldwork date	Sample size	Turnout	Unidas Podemos	PNV	PSE–EE	PP	EH Bildu	Cs	Vox	Lead
April 2019 general election	28 Apr 2019	—N/a	72.9	17.7; 2	34.3; 3	19.9; 2	7.3; 0	13.4; 1	3.1; 0	2.3; 0	14.4
Gizaker/EITB	16–17 Apr 2019	400	?	21.8; 2	32.3; 3	18.1; 2	8.5; 0	14.2; 1	3.0; 0	1.1; 0	10.5
NC Report/La Razón	1–17 Apr 2019	?	?	? 2	? 3	? 1	? 1	? 1	? 0	4.1; 0	?
GAD3/Vocento	25 Mar–17 Apr 2019	?	?	11.0; 1	33.0; 3	27.0; 2	10.0; 1	11.0; 1	3.0; 0	2.0; 0	6.0
Ikertalde/GPS	25–28 Mar 2019	600	68.5	17.5; 1	31.4; 3	20.2; 2	9.4; 1	11.7; 1	4.2; 0	2.8; 0	11.2
GAD3/Vocento	1–20 Mar 2019	?	?	16.0; 1	31.0; 3	21.0; 2	9.0; 1	12.0; 1	4.0; 0	3.0; 0	10.0
CIS	1–18 Mar 2019	424	?	? 1/2	? 3	? 2	? 0	? 1/2	? 0	? 0	?
Gizaker/EITB	1–5 Mar 2019	650	?	20.3; 2	32.2; 3	20.5; 2	9.0; 0	13.1; 1	3.4; 0	0.3; 0	11.7
2016 regional election	25 Sep 2016	—N/a	60.5	14.8 (1)	41.8 (4)	11.7 (1)	9.7 (1)	17.5 (1)	1.9 (0)	–	24.3
2016 general election	26 Jun 2016	—N/a	66.0	28.9; 3	28.2; 2	13.9; 1	12.7; 1	10.9; 1	3.3; 0	0.1; 0	0.7

=== Burgos ===
Polling firm/Commissioner	Fieldwork date	Sample size	Turnout	PP	PSOE	Unidas Podemos	Cs	Vox	Lead
April 2019 general election	28 Apr 2019	—N/a	74.4	24.6; 1	29.3; 2	12.5; 0	19.8; 1	11.1; 0	4.7
SyM Consulting/La Nueva Crónica	15–17 Apr 2019	?	?	? 2	? 1	? 0	? 0	? 1	?
GAD3/Vocento	25 Mar–17 Apr 2019	?	?	30.0; 2	29.0; 1	10.0; 0	16.0; 1	10.0; 0	1.0
NC Report/La Razón	1–11 Apr 2019	?	?	30.2; 2	26.1; 1	11.0; 0	17.8; 1	11.7; 0	4.1
GAD3/Vocento	1–20 Mar 2019	?	?	30.0; 2	28.0; 2	10.0; 0	13.0; 0	14.0; 0	2.0
CIS	1–18 Mar 2019	260	?	? 1/2	? 2	? 0	? 0/1	? 0	?
2016 general election	26 Jun 2016	—N/a	69.7	42.9; 2	22.1; 1	17.3; 1	14.7; 0	0.3; 0	20.8

=== Cáceres ===
Polling firm/Commissioner	Fieldwork date	Sample size	Turnout	PP	PSOE	Unidas Podemos	Cs	Vox	Lead
April 2019 general election	28 Apr 2019	—N/a	73.3	23.0; 1	37.4; 2	9.8; 0	17.1; 1	10.4; 0	14.4
NC Report/La Razón	1–17 Apr 2019	?	?	28.9; 2	41.2; 2	9.3; 0	12.3; 0	6.5; 0	12.3
GAD3/Vocento	25 Mar–17 Apr 2019	?	?	24.0; 1	38.0; 2	7.0; 0	13.0; 0	16.0; 1	15.0
GAD3/Vocento	1–20 Mar 2019	?	?	29.0; 2	40.0; 2	8.0; 0	8.0; 0	12.0; 0	11.0
CIS	1–18 Mar 2019	219	?	? 1	? 2	? 0	? 1	? 0	?
2016 general election	26 Jun 2016	—N/a	68.7	40.4; 2	33.3; 2	14.0; 0	10.3; 0	0.2; 0	7.1

=== Cádiz ===
Polling firm/Commissioner	Fieldwork date	Sample size	Turnout	PP	PSOE	Unidas Podemos	Cs	Vox	Lead
April 2019 general election	28 Apr 2019	—N/a	67.6	14.9; 1	31.5; 3	16.6; 2	19.7; 2	13.1; 1	11.8
GAD3/Vocento	25 Mar–17 Apr 2019	?	?	16.0; 1	37.0; 4	13.0; 1	17.0; 2	14.0; 1	20.0
NC Report/La Razón	1–11 Apr 2019	?	?	23.2; 2	34.5; 4	14.0; 1	16.9; 2	7.6; 0	11.3
GAD3/Vocento	1–20 Mar 2019	?	?	23.0; 2	34.0; 4	12.0; 1	14.0; 1	12.0; 1	11.0
CIS	1–18 Mar 2019	370	?	? 1	? 4	? 1/2	? 1	? 1/2	?
2018 regional election	2 Dec 2018	—N/a	52.1	17.6 (2)	23.8 (2)	19.2 (2)	20.9 (2)	11.2 (1)	2.9
2016 general election	26 Jun 2016	—N/a	62.6	32.3; 3	28.5; 3	21.2; 2	14.3; 1	0.2; 0	3.8

=== Castellón ===
Polling firm/Commissioner	Fieldwork date	Sample size	Turnout	PP	ALV	PSOE	Cs	Vox	Unidas Podemos	Compromís	Lead
April 2019 general election	28 Apr 2019	—N/a	75.6	20.3; 1	–	29.5; 2	16.3; 1	12.0; 0	13.9; 1	5.3; 0	9.2
NC Report/La Razón	1–17 Apr 2019	?	?	25.5; 2	–	26.9; 2	17.4; 1	8.5; 0	7.2; 0	10.1; 0	1.4
GAD3/Vocento	25 Mar–17 Apr 2019	?	?	? 2	–	? 2	? 0	? 1	? 0	? 0	Tie
SyM Consulting/Valencia Plaza	4–5 Apr 2019	?	?	16.0; 1	–	28.9; 2	14.1; 0/1	20.8; 1	10.8; 0/1	6.5; 0	8.1
GAD3/Vocento	1–20 Mar 2019	?	?	23.0; 2	–	29.0; 2	? 1	? 0	? 0	? 0	6.0
CIS	1–18 Mar 2019	317	?	? 1	–	? 2/3	? 1	? 0/1	? 0	? 0	?
SyM Consulting/Valencia Plaza	21–23 Feb 2019	?	?	25.7; 2	–	23.6; 1/2	9.5; 0	23.0; 1/2	8.1; 0	6.8; 0	2.1
2016 general election	26 Jun 2016	—N/a	72.6	35.7; 2	24.2; 1	22.1; 1	14.7; 1	0.2; 0			11.5

=== Ceuta ===
Color key:

Poll conducted after legal ban on opinion polls

Polling firm/Commissioner	Fieldwork date	Sample size	Turnout	PP	PSOE	Cs	Unidas Podemos	Vox	Lead
April 2019 general election	28 Apr 2019	—N/a	61.4	21.4; 0	36.3; 1	12.0; 0	4.8; 0	23.9; 0	12.4
GAD3/RTVE–FORTA	12–27 Apr 2019	?	?	? 0	? 0	? 0	? 0	27.0; 1	?
Sigma Dos/El Mundo	3–17 Apr 2019	?	?	? 0/1	? 0/1	? 0	? 0	? 0/1	Tie
NC Report/La Razón	1–17 Apr 2019	?	?	36.2; 1	27.2; 0	12.2; 0	6.1; 0	15.9; 0	9.0
GAD3/Vocento	25 Mar–17 Apr 2019	?	?	? 0	? 0	? 0	? 0	? 1	?
CIS	1–18 Mar 2019	?	?	? 0/1	? 0/1	? 0	? 0	? 0/1	Tie
2016 general election	26 Jun 2016	—N/a	50.7	51.9; 1	22.6; 0	11.5; 0	10.9; 0	0.5; 0	29.3

=== Ciudad Real ===
Polling firm/Commissioner	Fieldwork date	Sample size	Turnout	PP	PSOE	Unidas Podemos	Cs	Vox	Lead
April 2019 general election	28 Apr 2019	—N/a	75.2	23.7; 1	34.3; 2	9.2; 0	17.3; 1	13.7; 1	10.6
GAD3/Vocento	25 Mar–17 Apr 2019	?	?	? 2	? 2	? 0	? 0	? 1	Tie
NC Report/La Razón	1–11 Apr 2019	?	?	31.0; 2	35.0; 2	9.0; 0	14.5; 1	7.7; 0	4.0
SW Demoscopia/La Tribuna	2–5 Apr 2019	400	?	22.6; 1	36.3; 2	6.6; 0	13.3; 1	19.2; 1	13.7
GAD3/Vocento	1–20 Mar 2019	?	?	? 2	? 2	? 0	? 0	? 1	?
CIS	1–18 Mar 2019	197	?	? 1	? 2	? 0	? 1	? 1	?
2016 general election	26 Jun 2016	—N/a	70.6	43.5; 3	29.3; 2	13.4; 0	11.9; 0	–	14.2

=== Córdoba ===
Polling firm/Commissioner	Fieldwork date	Sample size	Turnout	PP	PSOE	Unidas Podemos	Cs	Vox	Lead
April 2019 general election	28 Apr 2019	—N/a	74.1	18.8; 1	34.4; 2	14.9; 1	16.9; 1	12.0; 1	15.6
GAD3/Vocento	25 Mar–17 Apr 2019	?	?	23.0; 1	35.0; 3	11.0; 0	14.0; 1	14.0; 1	12.0
NC Report/La Razón	1–11 Apr 2019	?	?	24.2; 1	38.0; 3	12.5; 1	15.3; 1	5.8; 0	13.8
GAD3/Vocento	1–20 Mar 2019	?	?	24.0; 2	37.0; 3	11.0; 0	12.0; 1	12.0; 0	13.0
CIS	1–18 Mar 2019	318	?	? 1	? 3	? 1	? 1	? 0	?
2018 regional election	2 Dec 2018	—N/a	60.5	21.9 (2)	29.2 (2)	16.8 (1)	17.6 (1)	9.2 (0)	7.3
2016 general election	26 Jun 2016	—N/a	69.4	34.4; 2	31.2; 2	19.0; 1	12.4; 1	0.2; 0	3.2

=== Cuenca ===
Polling firm/Commissioner	Fieldwork date	Sample size	Turnout	PP	PSOE	Unidas Podemos	Cs	Vox	Lead
April 2019 general election	28 Apr 2019	—N/a	78.1	26.8; 1	35.7; 2	7.9; 0	13.8; 0	14.0; 0	8.9
GAD3/Vocento	25 Mar–17 Apr 2019	?	?	? 1	? 2	? 0	? 0	? 0	?
NC Report/La Razón	1–11 Apr 2019	?	?	33.5; 1	35.7; 2	8.5; 0	11.2; 0	9.0; 0	2.2
SW Demoscopia/La Tribuna	2–5 Apr 2019	400	?	20.9; 1	36.1; 1/2	8.2; 0	15.4; 0	17.4; 0/1	15.2
GAD3/Vocento	1–20 Mar 2019	?	?	? 1	? 2	? 0	? 0	? 0	?
CIS	1–18 Mar 2019	205	?	? 1	? 1	? 0	? 0	? 1	Tie
2016 general election	26 Jun 2016	—N/a	74.2	45.8; 2	29.7; 1	13.2; 0	9.4; 0	0.2; 0	16.1

=== Gipuzkoa ===
Polling firm/Commissioner	Fieldwork date	Sample size	Turnout	Unidas Podemos	PNV	EH Bildu	PSE–EE	PP	Cs	Vox	Lead
April 2019 general election	28 Apr 2019	—N/a	71.0	17.3; 1	29.0; 2	23.4; 2	18.9; 1	5.0; 0	2.9; 0	1.6; 0	5.6
Gizaker/EITB	16–17 Apr 2019	400	?	21.9; 1/2	26.7; 2	22.2; 1/2	16.7; 1	7.8; 0	3.0; 0	0.6; 0	4.5
NC Report/La Razón	1–17 Apr 2019	?	?	? 2	? 2	? 1	? 1	? 0	? 0	? 0	Tie
GAD3/Vocento	25 Mar–17 Apr 2019	?	?	12.0; 1	30.0; 2	15.0; 1	27.0; 2	8.0; 0	3.0; 0	1.0; 0	3.0
Gizaker/Gipuzkoa Deputation	1–8 Apr 2019	1,500	64.5	21.7; 1/2	27.1; 2	22.0; 1/2	17.2; 1	7.4; 0	2.9; 0	0.5; 0	5.1
Ikertalde/GPS	25–28 Mar 2019	500	67.0	19.1; 1	26.5; 2	20.5; 2	20.1; 1	6.7; 0	3.7; 0	1.5; 0	6.0
GAD3/Vocento	1–20 Mar 2019	?	?	16.0; 1	26.0; 2	21.0; 1	21.0; 2	7.0; 0	3.0; 0	3.0; 0	5.0
CIS	1–18 Mar 2019	320	?	? 1	? 2	? 2	? 1	? 0	? 0	? 0	Tie
Gizaker/EITB	1–5 Mar 2019	550	?	20.8; 1	25.8; 2	21.9; 2	19.3; 1	7.4; 0	3.4; 0	1.0; 0	3.9
2016 regional election	25 Sep 2016	—N/a	59.4	14.2 (1)	34.1 (2)	28.7 (2)	11.8 (1)	7.2 (0)	1.7 (0)	–	5.4
2016 general election	26 Jun 2016	—N/a	63.3	28.6; 2	23.3; 2	19.1; 1	14.1; 1	9.7; 0	3.2; 0	–	5.3

=== Girona ===
Polling firm/Commissioner	Fieldwork date	Sample size	Turnout	ERC–Sobiranistes	PDeCAT	ECP	PSC	PP	Cs	JxCat	Lead
April 2019 general election	28 Apr 2019	—N/a	73.5	29.8; 3		9.7; 0	17.1; 1	3.2; 0	8.9; 0	22.5; 2	7.3
NC Report/La Razón	1–17 Apr 2019	?	?	? 3		? 1	? 1	? 0	? 0	? 1	?
GAD3/Vocento	25 Mar–17 Apr 2019	?	?	? 3		? 1	? 1	? 0	? 0	? 1	?
GAD3/La Vanguardia	9–11 Apr 2019	?	?	? 2/3		? 1	? 1/2	? 0	? 0	? 1	?
Feedback/El Nacional	21–26 Mar 2019	?	?	29.3; 2		? 0	17.3; 1	? 0	10.2; 1	21.0; 2	8.3
GAD3/Vocento	1–20 Mar 2019	?	?	? 2		? 0	? 2	? 0	? 0	? 2	?
CIS	1–18 Mar 2019	297	?	? 3		? 0	? 1	? 0	? 0	? 2	?
2017 regional election	21 Dec 2017	—N/a	79.2	21.7 (2)		4.0 (0)	8.6 (0)	2.9 (0)	19.5 (1)	36.7 (3)	15.0
2016 general election	26 Jun 2016	—N/a	60.6	26.3; 2	23.2; 2	17.3; 1	12.5; 1	10.1; 0	7.7; 0	–	3.1

=== Granada ===
Polling firm/Commissioner	Fieldwork date	Sample size	Turnout	PP	PSOE	Unidas Podemos	Cs	Vox	Lead
April 2019 general election	28 Apr 2019	—N/a	70.6	18.4; 1	33.9; 3	13.6; 1	17.4; 1	14.1; 1	15.5
GAD3/Vocento	25 Mar–17 Apr 2019	?	?	22.0; 2	37.0; 3	10.0; 0	17.0; 1	11.0; 1	15.0
NC Report/La Razón	1–11 Apr 2019	?	?	25.6; 2	37.0; 3	11.3; 1	15.7; 1	7.6; 0	11.4
GAD3/Vocento	1–20 Mar 2019	?	?	24.0; 2	37.0; 3	10.0; 0	13.0; 1	12.0; 1	13.0
CIS	1–18 Mar 2019	361	?	? 1	? 3	? 1	? 1	? 1	?
2018 regional election	2 Dec 2018	—N/a	57.0	23.1 (2)	26.9 (2)	15.1 (1)	18.4 (1)	11.4 (1)	3.8
2016 general election	26 Jun 2016	—N/a	66.0	35.3; 3	30.9; 2	17.8; 1	13.5; 1	0.2; 0	3.2

=== Guadalajara ===
Polling firm/Commissioner	Fieldwork date	Sample size	Turnout	PP	PSOE	Unidas Podemos	Cs	Vox	Lead
April 2019 general election	28 Apr 2019	—N/a	77.5	20.1; 1	29.8; 1	12.3; 0	18.8; 1	16.5; 0	9.7
GAD3/Vocento	25 Mar–17 Apr 2019	?	?	? 1	? 1	? 0	? 1	? 0	Tie
NC Report/La Razón	1–11 Apr 2019	?	?	27.3; 1	26.1; 1	10.8; 0	18.8; 1	14.1; 0	1.2
SW Demoscopia/La Tribuna	2–5 Apr 2019	400	?	22.4; 1	35.4; 1	6.4; 0	15.7; 0/1	17.5; 0/1	13.0
GAD3/Vocento	1–20 Mar 2019	?	?	? 1	? 1	? 0	? 1	? 0	?
CIS	1–18 Mar 2019	203	?	? 0	? 2	? 0	? 0	? 1	?
2016 general election	26 Jun 2016	—N/a	72.9	39.6; 2	23.0; 1	18.2; 0	16.4; 0	0.4; 0	16.6

=== Huelva ===
Polling firm/Commissioner	Fieldwork date	Sample size	Turnout	PSOE	PP	Unidas Podemos	Cs	Vox	Lead
April 2019 general election	28 Apr 2019	—N/a	67.7	37.0; 2	17.0; 1	13.0; 1	16.9; 1	12.8; 0	20.0
GAD3/Vocento	25 Mar–17 Apr 2019	?	?	49.0; 3	18.0; 1	6.0; 0	14.0; 1	11.0; 0	31.0
NC Report/La Razón	1–11 Apr 2019	?	?	43.1; 3	23.9; 1	10.0; 0	13.7; 1	6.0; 0	19.2
GAD3/Vocento	1–20 Mar 2019	?	?	42.0; 3	23.0; 2	9.0; 0	11.0; 0	11.0; 0	19.0
CIS	1–18 Mar 2019	?	?	? 2	? 1	? 1	? 1	? 0	?
2018 regional election	2 Dec 2018	—N/a	54.6	31.6 (2)	22.7 (1)	14.3 (1)	16.3 (1)	8.3 (0)	8.9
2016 general election	26 Jun 2016	—N/a	62.9	35.8; 2	33.3; 2	16.3; 1	11.7; 0	0.2; 0	2.5

=== Huesca ===
Polling firm/Commissioner	Fieldwork date	Sample size	Turnout	PP	PSOE	Unidas Podemos	Cs	Vox	Lead
April 2019 general election	28 Apr 2019	—N/a	73.4	20.1; 1	33.0; 1	13.7; 0	19.6; 1	10.7; 0	12.9
A+M/Heraldo de Aragón	15–17 Apr 2019	?	69.9	25.6; 1	34.1; 1/2	12.3; 0	17.6; 0/1	8.1; 0	8.5
GAD3/Vocento	25 Mar–17 Apr 2019	?	?	? 1	? 2	? 0	? 0	? 0	?
NC Report/La Razón	1–11 Apr 2019	?	?	24.6; 1	29.4; 1	12.0; 0	17.5; 1	13.4; 0	4.8
GAD3/Vocento	1–20 Mar 2019	?	?	? 1	? 2	? 0	? 0	? 0	?
CIS	1–18 Mar 2019	239	?	? 1	? 1/2	? 0	? 0/1	? 0	?
2016 general election	26 Jun 2016	—N/a	68.0	36.2; 1	25.6; 1	19.2; 1	15.3; 0	0.3; 0	10.6

=== Jaén ===
Polling firm/Commissioner	Fieldwork date	Sample size	Turnout	PSOE	PP	Unidas Podemos	Cs	Vox	Lead
April 2019 general election	28 Apr 2019	—N/a	74.4	39.5; 3	19.6; 1	10.6; 0	15.9; 1	12.1; 0	19.9
GAD3/Vocento	25 Mar–17 Apr 2019	?	?	39.0; 2	21.0; 1	7.0; 0	14.0; 1	14.0; 1	18.0
NC Report/La Razón	1–11 Apr 2019	?	?	44.6; 3	25.2; 2	8.6; 0	12.4; 0	6.5; 0	19.4
GAD3/Vocento	1–20 Mar 2019	?	?	43.0; 3	24.0; 2	8.0; 0	10.0; 0	11.0; 0	19.0
CIS	1–18 Mar 2019	?	?	? 3	? 1	? 0	? 0	? 1	?
2018 regional election	2 Dec 2018	—N/a	61.9	35.4 (2)	23.2 (1)	15.9 (1)	12.2 (1)	8.7 (0)	12.2
2016 general election	26 Jun 2016	—N/a	70.5	37.4; 2	35.4; 2	14.4; 1	10.5; 0	0.2; 0	2.0

=== Las Palmas ===
Polling firm/Commissioner	Fieldwork date	Sample size	Turnout	PP	PSOE	Unidas Podemos	Cs	CC	Vox	NCa	Lead
April 2019 general election	28 Apr 2019	—N/a	63.6	16.2; 2	28.3; 3	16.7; 2	15.4; 1	6.4; 0	7.0; 0	6.6; 0	11.6
TSA/Canarias7	21 Apr 2019	?	?	22.1; 2	27.5; 3	15.7; 1	13.3; 1	4.3; 0	5.3; 0	9.5; 1	5.4
GAD3/Vocento	25 Mar–17 Apr 2019	?	?	? 2	? 3	? 1	? 1	? 0	? 1	–	?
NC Report/La Razón	1–13 Apr 2019	?	?	25.1; 3	30.2; 3	14.8; 1	16.1; 1	3.7; 0	7.0; 0	–	5.1
GAD3/Vocento	1–20 Mar 2019	?	?	? 2	? 4	? 1	? 1	? 0	? 0	–	?
CIS	1–18 Mar 2019	?	?	? 2	? 3	? 1	? 1/2	? 0	? 0/1	–	?
2016 general election	26 Jun 2016	—N/a	60.4	33.9; 3	23.8; 2	22.5; 2	13.0; 1	3.6; 0	0.2; 0	(Note: Within PSOE.)	10.1

=== León ===
Polling firm/Commissioner	Fieldwork date	Sample size	Turnout	PP	PSOE	Unidas Podemos	Cs	Vox	Lead
April 2019 general election	28 Apr 2019	—N/a	68.2	23.5; 1	32.8; 2	12.0; 0	17.5; 1	11.5; 0	9.3
SyM Consulting/La Nueva Crónica	15–17 Apr 2019	643	72.6	23.5; 1	28.8; 2	13.7; 0	14.4; 0	15.7; 1	5.3
GAD3/Vocento	25 Mar–17 Apr 2019	?	?	27.0; 2	37.0; 2	8.0; 0	13.0; 0	12.0; 0	10.0
NC Report/La Razón	1–11 Apr 2019	?	?	29.1; 1/2	32.0; 2	11.5; 0	15.6; 0/1	8.4; 0	2.9
GAD3/Vocento	1–20 Mar 2019	?	?	28.0; 2	33.0; 2	10.0; 0	12.0; 0	13.0; 0	5.0
CIS	1–18 Mar 2019	?	?	? 1	? 2	? 0	? 0	? 1	?
2016 general election	26 Jun 2016	—N/a	64.5	40.1; 2	26.2; 1	17.6; 1	12.8; 0	0.2; 0	13.9

=== Lleida ===
Polling firm/Commissioner	Fieldwork date	Sample size	Turnout	ERC–Sobiranistes	PDeCAT	ECP	PP	PSC	Cs	JxCat	Lead
April 2019 general election	28 Apr 2019	—N/a	72.2	33.6; 2		8.3; 0	4.9; 0	16.7; 1	8.5; 0	20.7; 1	12.9
NC Report/La Razón	1–17 Apr 2019	?	?	? 2		? 0	? 0	? 1	? 0	? 1	?
GAD3/Vocento	25 Mar–17 Apr 2019	?	?	? 1		? 0	? 0	? 2	? 0	? 1	?
GAD3/La Vanguardia	9–11 Apr 2019	?	?	? 2		? 0	? 0	? 1/2	? 0/1	? 0	?
Feedback/El Nacional	21–26 Mar 2019	?	?	30.1; 2		? 0	? 0	17.1; 1	? 0	19.5; 1	10.6
GAD3/Vocento	1–20 Mar 2019	?	?	? 2		? 0	? 0	? 1	? 0	? 1	?
CIS	1–18 Mar 2019	?	?	? 2		? 0	? 0	? 1	? 0	? 1	?
2017 regional election	21 Dec 2017	—N/a	77.1	26.7 (1)		3.9 (0)	4.5 (0)	9.0 (0)	17.0 (1)	32.5 (2)	5.8
2016 general election	26 Jun 2016	—N/a	58.4	25.1; 1	22.6; 1	16.7; 1	13.5; 1	12.4; 0	7.0; 0	–	2.5

=== Lugo ===
Polling firm/Commissioner	Fieldwork date	Sample size	Turnout	PP	PSdeG–PSOE	En Marea	Cs	BNG	Vox	EC	Lead
April 2019 general election	28 Apr 2019	—N/a	59.1	33.6; 2	33.2; 2	1.1; 0	8.9; 0	4.8; 0	5.7; 0	10.1; 0	0.4
Sondaxe/La Voz de Galicia	14–17 Apr 2019	?	?	29.0; 2	33.0; 2	2.0; 0	11.0; 0	3.0; 0	12.0; 0	8.0; 0	4.0
GAD3/Vocento	25 Mar–17 Apr 2019	?	?	? 2	? 2	–	? 0	–	–	? 0	Tie
Sondaxe/La Voz de Galicia	13–16 Apr 2019	?	?	31.0; 2	29.0; 2	3.0; 0	14.0; 0	3.0; 0	10.0; 0	10.0; 0	2.0
Sondaxe/La Voz de Galicia	12–15 Apr 2019	?	?	32.0; 2	31.0; 2	4.0; 0	12.0; 0	4.0; 0	8.0; 0	7.0; 0	1.0
NC Report/La Razón	1–15 Apr 2019	?	?	35.7; 2	30.2; 2	5.1; 0	8.4; 0	–	7.4; 0	7.0; 0	5.5
Sondaxe/La Voz de Galicia	11–14 Apr 2019	?	?	31.7; 2	29.4; 2	3.9; 0	12.2; 0	6.6; 0	6.4; 0	6.3; 0	2.3
Sondaxe/La Voz de Galicia	10–13 Apr 2019	?	?	34.0; 2	29.0; 2	5.0; 0	13.0; 0	8.0; 0	4.0; 0	5.0; 0	5.0
Sondaxe/La Voz de Galicia	9–12 Apr 2019	?	?	34.0; 2	28.0; 2	5.0; 0	14.0; 0	7.0; 0	3.0; 0	7.0; 0	6.0
GAD3/Vocento	1–20 Mar 2019	?	?	? 2	? 2	–	? 0	–	–	? 0	?
CIS	1–18 Mar 2019	?	?	? 2	? 2	–	? 0	–	–	? 0	Tie
Sondaxe/La Voz de Galicia	13–16 Mar 2019	?	?	28.9; 2	24.5; 1	16.6; 1	? 0	–	4.1; 0	–	4.4
Sondaxe/La Voz de Galicia	13–21 Feb 2019	?	?	35.0; 2	20.5; 1	? 0	11.8; 1	–	–	–	14.5
2016 regional election	25 Sep 2016	—N/a	53.6	52.8 (3)	19.1 (1)	15.4 (0)	2.8 (0)	7.4 (0)	–	–	33.7
2016 general election	26 Jun 2016	—N/a	56.3	47.4; 2	23.7; 1	17.0; 1	6.9; 0	2.6; 0	–	–	23.7

=== Málaga ===
Polling firm/Commissioner	Fieldwork date	Sample size	Turnout	PP	PSOE	Unidas Podemos	Cs	Vox	Lead
April 2019 general election	28 Apr 2019	—N/a	69.3	17.7; 2	30.8; 4	14.5; 2	19.5; 2	14.0; 1	11.3
GAD3/Vocento	25 Mar–17 Apr 2019	?	?	19.0; 2	37.0; 4	9.0; 1	17.0; 2	15.0; 2	18.0
NC Report/La Razón	1–11 Apr 2019	?	?	24.8; 3	31.9; 4	11.5; 1	21.1; 2	9.0; 1	7.1
GAD3/Vocento	1–20 Mar 2019	?	?	24.0; 3	32.0; 4	11.0; 1	16.0; 2	12.0; 1	8.0
CIS	1–18 Mar 2019	?	?	? 2/3	? 3/4	? 1	? 2	? 2	?
2018 regional election	2 Dec 2018	—N/a	54.2	22.6 (3)	24.2 (3)	15.7 (2)	19.8 (2)	11.5 (1)	1.6
2016 general election	26 Jun 2016	—N/a	64.6	34.4; 4	27.0; 3	18.9; 2	16.3; 2	0.2; 0	7.4

=== Melilla ===
Color key:

Poll conducted after legal ban on opinion polls

Polling firm/Commissioner	Fieldwork date	Sample size	Turnout	PP	PSOE	Cs	Unidas Podemos	Vox	CpM	Lead
April 2019 general election	28 Apr 2019	—N/a	57.5	24.0; 1	20.7; 0	12.9; 0	3.8; 0	17.2; 0	20.3; 0	3.3
GAD3/RTVE–FORTA	12–27 Apr 2019	?	?	30.0; 1	? 0	? 0	? 0	? 0	–	?
Sigma Dos/El Mundo	3–17 Apr 2019	?	?	? 1	? 0	? 0	? 0	? 0	–	?
NC Report/La Razón	1–17 Apr 2019	?	?	33.2; 1	28.9; 0	14.1; 0	6.1; 0	15.0; 0	–	4.3
GAD3/Vocento	25 Mar–17 Apr 2019	?	?	? 1	? 0	? 0	? 0	? 0	–	?
CIS	1–18 Mar 2019	?	?	? 0/1	? 0/1	? 0	? 0	–	–	Tie
SyM Consulting	1–2 Feb 2019	464	?	21.1; 0	33.6; 1	5.6; 0	–	24.4; 0	9.3; 0	9.2
2016 general election	26 Jun 2016	—N/a	47.6	49.9; 1	25.1; 0	12.4; 0	9.8; 0	–	–	24.8

=== Ourense ===
Polling firm/Commissioner	Fieldwork date	Sample size	Turnout	PP	PSdeG–PSOE	En Marea	Cs	BNG	Vox	EC	Lead
April 2019 general election	28 Apr 2019	—N/a	54.0	34.8; 2	32.9; 2	1.2; 0	10.7; 0	3.9; 0	5.2; 0	8.9; 0	1.9
Sondaxe/La Voz de Galicia	14–17 Apr 2019	?	?	34.0; 2	35.0; 2	2.0; 0	12.0; 0	4.0; 0	5.0; 0	7.0; 0	1.0
GAD3/Vocento	25 Mar–17 Apr 2019	?	?	? 2	? 2	–	? 0	–	–	? 0	Tie
Sondaxe/La Voz de Galicia	13–16 Apr 2019	?	?	33.0; 2	36.0; 2	2.0; 0	11.0; 0	4.0; 0	5.0; 0	7.0; 0	3.0
Sondaxe/La Voz de Galicia	12–15 Apr 2019	?	?	34.0; 2	34.0; 2	3.0; 0	9.0; 0	4.0; 0	7.0; 0	7.0; 0	Tie
NC Report/La Razón	1–15 Apr 2019	?	?	37.6; 2	30.0; 2	4.9; 0	8.6; 0	–	7.9; 0	6.4; 0	7.6
Sondaxe/La Voz de Galicia	11–14 Apr 2019	?	?	35.8; 2	35.1; 2	2.6; 0	7.0; 0	4.0; 0	6.8; 0	6.2; 0	0.7
Sondaxe/La Voz de Galicia	10–13 Apr 2019	?	?	40.0; 2	34.0; 2	3.0; 0	4.0; 0	6.0; 0	5.0; 0	6.0; 0	6.0
Sondaxe/La Voz de Galicia	9–12 Apr 2019	?	?	43.0; 2	30.0; 2	2.0; 0	6.0; 0	8.0; 0	3.0; 0	6.0; 0	13.0
GAD3/Vocento	1–20 Mar 2019	?	?	? 2	? 2	–	? 0	–	–	? 0	?
CIS	1–18 Mar 2019	?	?	? 2	? 2	–	? 0	–	–	? 0	Tie
Sondaxe/La Voz de Galicia	13–16 Mar 2019	?	?	34.4; 2	32.2; 2	–	–	–	3.5; 0	–	2.2
Sondaxe/La Voz de Galicia	13–21 Feb 2019	?	?	40.2; 2	26.3; 1	16.5; 1	–	–	–	–	13.9
2016 regional election	25 Sep 2016	—N/a	48.7	53.1 (3)	17.6 (1)	13.8 (0)	2.8 (0)	6.0 (0)	–	–	35.5
2016 general election	26 Jun 2016	—N/a	51.7	49.7; 3	23.3; 1	15.6; 0	7.1; 0	2.2; 0	–	–	21.7

=== Palencia ===
Polling firm/Commissioner	Fieldwork date	Sample size	Turnout	PP	PSOE	Unidas Podemos	Cs	Vox	Lead
April 2019 general election	28 Apr 2019	—N/a	75.8	29.5; 1	31.3; 1	9.2; 0	15.9; 1	11.7; 0	1.8
SyM Consulting/La Nueva Crónica	15–17 Apr 2019	?	?	? 1	? 1	? 0	? 0	? 1	Tie
GAD3/Vocento	25 Mar–17 Apr 2019	?	?	36.0; 1/2	31.0; 1/2	9.0; 0	10.0; 0	11.0; 0	5.0
NC Report/La Razón	1–11 Apr 2019	?	?	32.4; 2	29.4; 1	9.6; 0	15.2; 0	10.4; 0	3.0
GAD3/Vocento	1–20 Mar 2019	?	?	32.0; 1/2	31.0; 1/2	9.0; 0	11.0; 0	14.0; 0	1.0
CIS	1–18 Mar 2019	?	?	? 1	? 1	? 0	? 0/1	? 0/1	Tie
2016 general election	26 Jun 2016	—N/a	70.8	45.7; 2	24.6; 1	15.0; 0	12.4; 0	–	21.1

=== Pontevedra ===
Polling firm/Commissioner	Fieldwork date	Sample size	Turnout	PP	En Marea	PSdeG–PSOE	Cs	BNG	Vox	EC	Lead
April 2019 general election	28 Apr 2019	—N/a	64.6	25.0; 2	1.2; 0	32.2; 3	11.1; 1	5.6; 0	4.8; 0	17.5; 1	7.2
Sondaxe/La Voz de Galicia	14–17 Apr 2019	?	?	28.0; 3	6.0; 0	32.0; 3	8.0; 0	4.0; 0	3.0; 0	16.0; 1	4.0
GAD3/Vocento	25 Mar–17 Apr 2019	?	?	? 2	–	? 3	? 1	? 0	–	? 1	?
Sondaxe/La Voz de Galicia	13–16 Apr 2019	?	?	27.0; 2	9.0; 0	32.0; 3	9.0; 1	3.0; 0	3.0; 0	15.0; 1	5.0
Sondaxe/La Voz de Galicia	12–15 Apr 2019	?	?	29.0; 3	8.0; 0	32.0; 3	7.0; 0	4.0; 0	4.0; 0	14.0; 1	3.0
NC Report/La Razón	1–15 Apr 2019	?	?	29.2; 2/3	7.5; 0	28.1; 2/3	11.5; 1	? 0	6.0; 0	11.2; 1	1.1
Sondaxe/La Voz de Galicia	11–14 Apr 2019	?	?	30.5; 3	7.3; 0	31.5; 3	5.5; 0	2.9; 0	6.2; 0	13.8; 1	1.0
Sondaxe/La Voz de Galicia	10–13 Apr 2019	?	?	30.0; 3	3.0; 0	33.0; 3	8.0; 0	7.0; 0	3.0; 0	10.0; 1	3.0
Sondaxe/La Voz de Galicia	9–12 Apr 2019	?	?	31.0; 3	2.0; 0	31.0; 3	10.0; 0	4.0; 0	9.0; 0	12.0; 1	Tie
GAD3/Vocento	1–20 Mar 2019	?	?	? 2	–	? 3	? 0	? 1	–	? 1	?
CIS	1–18 Mar 2019	?	?	? 2	–	? 3	? 1	–	–	? 1	?
Sondaxe/La Voz de Galicia	13–16 Mar 2019	?	?	29.3; 3	18.1; 1	23.0; 2	9.6; 1	9.4; 0	6.7; 0	–	6.3
Sondaxe/La Voz de Galicia	13–21 Feb 2019	?	?	40.6; 4	18.9; 1	26.9; 2	–	–	–	–	13.7
2016 regional election	25 Sep 2016	—N/a	55.1	43.3 (4)	22.0 (2)	18.4 (1)	3.9 (0)	9.0 (0)	–	–	21.3
2016 general election	26 Jun 2016	—N/a	61.2	38.4; 3	25.2; 2	21.8; 2	8.9; 0	3.1; 0	–	–	13.2

=== Santa Cruz de Tenerife ===
Polling firm/Commissioner	Fieldwork date	Sample size	Turnout	PP	PSOE	Unidas Podemos	CC	Cs	Vox	Lead
April 2019 general election	28 Apr 2019	—N/a	61.3	14.8; 1	27.3; 2	14.7; 1	19.9; 2	13.9; 1	6.1; 0	7.4
GAD3/Vocento	25 Mar–17 Apr 2019	?	?	? 2	? 3	? 0	? 1	? 1	? 0	?
NC Report/La Razón	1–13 Apr 2019	?	?	25.7; 2	26.7; 2	12.0; 1	11.6; 1	13.4; 1	7.1; 0	1.0
GAD3/Vocento	1–20 Mar 2019	?	?	? 2	? 3	? 0	? 1	? 1	? 0	?
CIS	1–18 Mar 2019	?	?	? 1	? 2/3	? 1	? 0/1	? 1	? 1	?
2016 general election	26 Jun 2016	—N/a	57.8	34.2; 3	21.2; 1	17.9; 1	12.6; 1	11.0; 1	–	13.0

=== Salamanca ===
Polling firm/Commissioner	Fieldwork date	Sample size	Turnout	PP	PSOE	Cs	Unidas Podemos	Vox	Lead
April 2019 general election	28 Apr 2019	—N/a	69.7	28.6; 2	28.2; 1	20.7; 1	7.9; 0	12.6; 0	0.4
SyM Consulting/La Nueva Crónica	15–17 Apr 2019	?	?	? 2	? 1	? 0	? 0	? 1	?
GAD3/Vocento	25 Mar–17 Apr 2019	?	?	31.0; 1/2	28.0; 1/2	18.0; 1	10.0; 0	10.0; 0	3.0
NC Report/La Razón	1–11 Apr 2019	?	?	34.4; 2	25.7; 1	18.7; 1	8.0; 0	10.8; 0	8.7
GAD3/Vocento	1–20 Mar 2019	?	?	31.0; 2	27.0; 1	17.0; 0/1	7.0; 0	15.0; 0/1	4.0
CIS	1–18 Mar 2019	?	?	? 2	? 1	? 0	? 0	? 1	?
2016 general election	26 Jun 2016	—N/a	66.3	48.2; 3	21.4; 1	15.7; 0	12.6; 0	–	26.8

=== Segovia ===
Polling firm/Commissioner	Fieldwork date	Sample size	Turnout	PP	PSOE	Cs	Unidas Podemos	Vox	Lead
April 2019 general election	28 Apr 2019	—N/a	78.6	26.9; 1	28.2; 1	20.0; 1	9.7; 0	12.4; 0	1.3
SyM Consulting/La Nueva Crónica	15–17 Apr 2019	?	?	? 1	? 1	? 1	? 0	? 0	Tie
GAD3/Vocento	25 Mar–17 Apr 2019	?	?	31.0; 1/2	32.0; 1/2	16.0; 0	8.0; 0	11.0; 0	1.0
NC Report/La Razón	1–11 Apr 2019	?	?	32.2; 1/2	25.8; 1	18.7; 0/1	9.8; 0	11.7; 0	6.4
GAD3/Vocento	1–20 Mar 2019	?	?	31.0; 1	28.0; 1	15.0; 1	9.0; 0	13.0; 0	3.0
CIS	1–18 Mar 2019	?	?	? 1	? 1	? 1	? 0	? 0	Tie
2016 general election	26 Jun 2016	—N/a	74.2	45.4; 2	21.5; 1	15.4; 0	15.2; 0	0.3; 0	23.9

=== Seville ===
Polling firm/Commissioner	Fieldwork date	Sample size	Turnout	PSOE	PP	Unidas Podemos	Cs	Vox	Lead
April 2019 general election	28 Apr 2019	—N/a	73.7	37.1; 5	14.5; 2	16.0; 2	16.7; 2	12.2; 1	20.4
GAD3/Vocento	25 Mar–17 Apr 2019	?	?	40.0; 6	17.0; 2	13.0; 1	17.0; 2	11.0; 1	23.0
NC Report/La Razón	1–11 Apr 2019	?	?	39.6; 5	20.8; 2/3	13.1; 1/2	16.2; 2	7.7; 1	18.8
GAD3/Vocento	1–20 Mar 2019	?	?	39.0; 5	20.0; 3	13.0; 2	13.0; 1	10.0; 1	19.0
CIS	1–18 Mar 2019	?	?	? 5/6	? 2	? 1/2	? 2	? 1	?
2018 regional election	2 Dec 2018	—N/a	59.2	30.0 (4)	16.5 (2)	18.9 (3)	17.8 (2)	10.7 (1)	11.1
2016 general election	26 Jun 2016	—N/a	68.2	33.6; 4	29.0; 4	20.8; 3	13.4; 1	0.2; 0	4.6

=== Soria ===
Polling firm/Commissioner	Fieldwork date	Sample size	Turnout	PP	PSOE	Unidas Podemos	Cs	Vox	Lead
April 2019 general election	28 Apr 2019	—N/a	68.8	26.7; 1	31.7; 1	8.6; 0	16.3; 0	9.3; 0	5.0
SyM Consulting/La Nueva Crónica	15–17 Apr 2019	?	?	? 1	? 1	? 0	? 0	? 0	Tie
GAD3/Vocento	25 Mar–17 Apr 2019	?	?	40.0; 1	29.0; 1	8.0; 0	6.0; 0	14.0; 0	11.0
NC Report/La Razón	1–11 Apr 2019	?	?	32.9; 1	31.5; 1	10.0; 0	14.4; 0	8.9; 0	1.4
GAD3/Vocento	1–20 Mar 2019	?	?	30.0; 1	33.0; 1	9.0; 0	12.0; 0	12.0; 0	3.0
CIS	1–18 Mar 2019	?	?	? 1	? 1	? 0	? 0	? 0	Tie
2016 general election	26 Jun 2016	—N/a	65.5	44.9; 1	25.7; 1	15.3; 0	11.4; 0	0.2; 0	19.2

=== Tarragona ===
Polling firm/Commissioner	Fieldwork date	Sample size	Turnout	ECP	ERC–Sobiranistes	PSC	PP	PDeCAT	Cs	JxCat	Lead
April 2019 general election	28 Apr 2019	—N/a	73.6	12.2; 1	27.2; 2	21.4; 1	5.1; 0		12.5; 1	12.3; 1	5.8
NC Report/La Razón	1–17 Apr 2019	?	?	? 1	? 2	? 1	? 1		? 1	? 0	?
GAD3/Vocento	25 Mar–17 Apr 2019	?	?	? 0	? 2	? 3	? 0		? 1	? 0	?
GAD3/La Vanguardia	9–11 Apr 2019	?	?	? 0	? 2	? 3	? 0/1		? 1	? 0/1	?
Feedback/El Nacional	21–26 Mar 2019	?	?	? 0	25.5; 2	22.2; 2	? 0		14.1; 1	12.1; 1	3.3
GAD3/Vocento	1–20 Mar 2019	?	?	? 1	? 2	? 2	? 0		? 1	? 0	?
CIS	1–18 Mar 2019	?	?	? 0/1	? 3	? 1/2	? 0		? 1	? 0	?
2017 regional election	21 Dec 2017	—N/a	78.4	5.4 (0)	23.7 (2)	11.8 (1)	4.6 (0)		27.4 (2)	21.7 (1)	3.7
2016 general election	26 Jun 2016	—N/a	61.8	21.9; 1	19.7; 1	15.7; 1	14.9; 1	13.7; 1	11.3; 1	–	2.2

=== Teruel ===
Color key:

Poll conducted after legal ban on opinion polls

Polling firm/Commissioner	Fieldwork date	Sample size	Turnout	PP	PSOE	Unidas Podemos	Cs	Vox	Lead
April 2019 general election	28 Apr 2019	—N/a	73.7	23.8; 1	32.8; 1	10.5; 0	19.7; 1	10.7; 0	9.0
GAD3/RTVE–FORTA	12–27 Apr 2019	?	?	23.0; 1	31.0; 2	? 0	? 0	? 0	8.0
A+M/Heraldo de Aragón	15–17 Apr 2019	?	71.2	29.3; 1	28.8; 1	13.1; 0	21.3; 1	5.3; 0	0.5
GAD3/Vocento	25 Mar–17 Apr 2019	?	?	? 1	? 2	? 0	? 0	? 0	?
NC Report/La Razón	1–11 Apr 2019	?	?	28.2; 1	30.1; 1/2	10.0; 0	15.1; 0/1	12.9; 0	1.9
GAD3/Vocento	1–20 Mar 2019	?	?	? 1	? 2	? 0	? 0	? 0	?
CIS	1–18 Mar 2019	205	?	? 1	? 1	? 0	? 1	? 0	Tie
2016 general election	26 Jun 2016	—N/a	69.4	41.3; 2	26.3; 1	16.8; 0	13.2; 0	–	15.0

=== Toledo ===
Polling firm/Commissioner	Fieldwork date	Sample size	Turnout	PP	PSOE	Unidas Podemos	Cs	Vox	Lead
April 2019 general election	28 Apr 2019	—N/a	76.8	22.0; 2	31.1; 2	10.6; 0	17.6; 1	16.9; 1	9.1
GAD3/Vocento	25 Mar–17 Apr 2019	?	?	? 2	? 2	? 0	? 1	? 1	Tie
NC Report/La Razón	1–11 Apr 2019	?	?	31.0; 2	31.7; 2/3	9.2; 0	15.5; 1	10.2; 0/1	0.7
SW Demoscopia/La Tribuna	2–5 Apr 2019	400	?	19.1; 1	37.5; 3	10.9; 0	13.7; 1	16.5; 1	18.4
GAD3/Vocento	1–20 Mar 2019	?	?	? 2	? 2	? 0	? 1	? 1	Tie
CIS	1–18 Mar 2019	?	?	? 2	? 2	? 0	? 1	? 1	Tie
2016 general election	26 Jun 2016	—N/a	71.8	43.4; 3	26.6; 2	14.7; 1	13.0; 0	0.3; 0	6.2

=== Valencia ===
Polling firm/Commissioner	Fieldwork date	Sample size	Turnout	PP	ALV	PSOE	Cs	PACMA	Vox	Unidas Podemos	Compromís	Lead
April 2019 general election	28 Apr 2019	—N/a	74.9	17.6; 3	–	27.1; 4	17.5; 3	1.4; 0	11.7; 2	14.5; 2	8.7; 1	9.6
NC Report/La Razón	1–17 Apr 2019	?	?	24.3; 4	–	24.5; 4	17.2; 3	–	9.0; 1	8.7; 1	11.8; 2	0.2
GAD3/Vocento	25 Mar–17 Apr 2019	?	?	? 4	–	? 5	? 2	? 0	? 1	? 2	? 1	?
SyM Consulting/Valencia Plaza	4–5 Apr 2019	?	?	18.7; 3	–	28.5; 5	11.3; 1/2	–	15.2; 2	14.5; 2	6.6; 1	9.8
GAD3/Vocento	1–20 Mar 2019	?	?	23.0; 4	–	27.0; 4	? 2	–	? 2	? 2	? 1	4.0
CIS	1–18 Mar 2019	?	?	? 3	–	? 5	? 2/3	? 0/1	? 1/2	? 2	? 1/2	?
SyM Consulting/Valencia Plaza	21–23 Feb 2019	?	?	20.1; 3	–	22.2; 3/4	16.1; 2/3	–	18.8; 3	13.1; 2	7.1; 1	2.1
2016 general election	26 Jun 2016	—N/a	73.6	34.0; 6	27.8; 5	20.1; 3	14.5; 2	1.3; 0	0.2; 0			6.2

=== Valladolid ===
Polling firm/Commissioner	Fieldwork date	Sample size	Turnout	PP	PSOE	Unidas Podemos	Cs	Vox	Lead
April 2019 general election	28 Apr 2019	—N/a	78.7	23.3; 1	28.9; 2	11.7; 0	20.1; 1	13.7; 1	5.6
SyM Consulting/La Nueva Crónica	15–17 Apr 2019	?	?	? 1	? 2	? 0	? 1	? 1	?
GAD3/Vocento	25 Mar–17 Apr 2019	?	?	23.0; 1	33.0; 2	6.0; 0	18.0; 1	17.0; 1	10.0
NC Report/La Razón	1–11 Apr 2019	?	?	28.6; 2	26.6; 2	10.0; 0	18.6; 1	12.9; 0	2.0
GAD3/Vocento	1–20 Mar 2019	?	?	28.0; 1/2	29.0; 2	10.0; 0	16.0; 1	13.0; 0/1	1.0
CIS	1–18 Mar 2019	?	?	? 1	? 2	? 0	? 1	? 1	?
2016 general election	26 Jun 2016	—N/a	73.7	41.8; 2	22.7; 1	16.4; 1	15.6; 1	0.3; 0	19.2

=== Zamora ===
Polling firm/Commissioner	Fieldwork date	Sample size	Turnout	PP	PSOE	Unidas Podemos	Cs	Vox	Lead
April 2019 general election	28 Apr 2019	—N/a	66.4	29.6; 1	31.3; 1	8.3; 0	16.9; 1	11.6; 0	1.7
SyM Consulting/La Nueva Crónica	15–17 Apr 2019	?	?	? 2	? 1	? 0	? 0	? 0	?
GAD3/Vocento	25 Mar–17 Apr 2019	?	?	26.0; 1	36.0; 2	7.0; 0	14.0; 0	12.0; 0	10.0
NC Report/La Razón	1–11 Apr 2019	?	?	34.7; 2	28.1; 1	9.8; 0	13.9; 0	11.2; 0	6.6
GAD3/Vocento	1–20 Mar 2019	?	?	33.0; 2	31.0; 1	8.0; 0	12.0; 0	13.0; 0	2.0
CIS	1–18 Mar 2019	?	?	? 1	? 1	? 0	? 1	? 0	Tie
2016 general election	26 Jun 2016	—N/a	63.7	48.3; 2	23.9; 1	14.1; 0	11.4; 0	–	24.4

=== Zaragoza ===
Polling firm/Commissioner	Fieldwork date	Sample size	Turnout	PP	PSOE	Unidas Podemos	Cs	Vox	Lead
April 2019 general election	28 Apr 2019	—N/a	75.8	18.0; 1	31.3; 3	14.0; 1	20.9; 1	12.7; 1	10.4
A+M/Heraldo de Aragón	15–17 Apr 2019	?	71.4	25.5; 2	29.4; 2/3	12.1; 1	20.9; 1/2	9.2; 0/1	3.9
GAD3/Vocento	25 Mar–17 Apr 2019	?	?	? 1	? 3	? 1	? 1	? 1	?
NC Report/La Razón	1–11 Apr 2019	?	?	24.1; 2	28.0; 2	12.9; 1	19.4; 1	12.6; 1	3.9
GAD3/Vocento	1–20 Mar 2019	?	?	? 2	? 2	? 1	? 1	? 1	Tie
CIS	1–18 Mar 2019	370	?	? 2	? 2	? 1	? 1	? 1	Tie
2016 general election	26 Jun 2016	—N/a	70.4	34.9; 3	24.4; 2	20.3; 1	16.8; 1	0.3; 0	10.5

== See also ==
- Opinion polling for the April 2019 Spanish general election
