= Zamora (Congress of Deputies constituency) =

Electoral constituency in Spain

Coordinates: 41°45′N 6°00′W

- Congress of Deputies; Electoral constituency
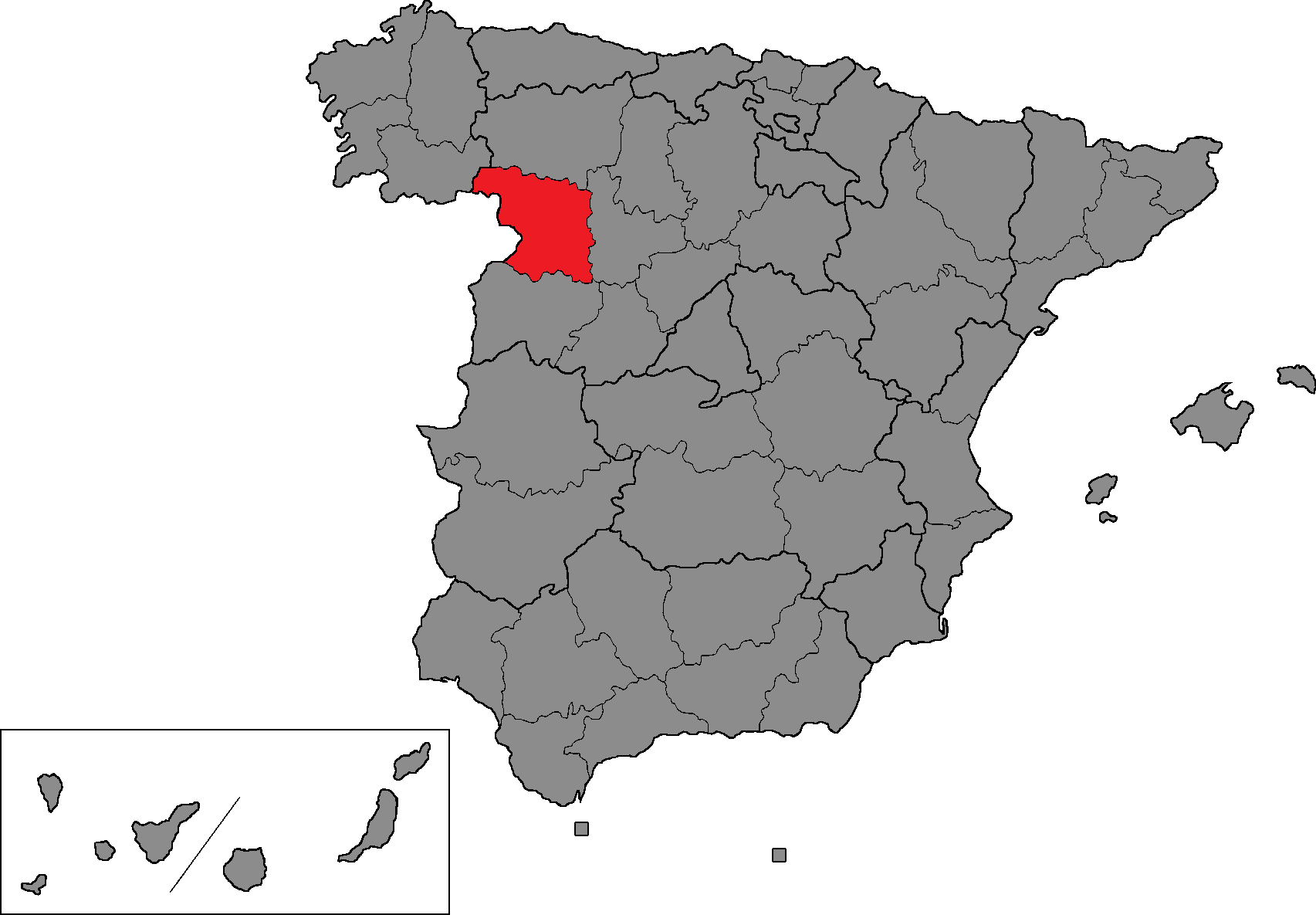
- Location of Zamora within Spain
- Province: Zamora
- Autonomous community: Castile and León
- Population: ▼165,832 (2024)
- Electorate: ▼162,998 (2023)
- Major settlements: Zamora, Benavente

Current constituency
- Created: 1977
- Seats: 4 (1977–1989); 3 (1989–present)
- Members: PP (2); PSOE (1)

Zamora is one of the 52 constituencies represented in the Congress of Deputies, the lower chamber of the Spanish parliament, the Cortes Generales. The constituency (whose boundaries correspond to those of the homonymous province) currently elects four deputies. The electoral system uses the D'Hondt method and closed-list proportional voting, with a minimum threshold of three percent.

== Electoral system ==
The constituency was created as per the Political Reform Law and was first contested in the 1977 general election. The Law provided for the provinces of Spain to be established as multi-member districts in the Congress of Deputies, with this regulation being maintained under the Spanish Constitution of 1978. Additionally, the Constitution requires for any modification of the provincial limits to be approved under an organic law, needing an absolute majority in the Cortes Generales.

Voting is based on universal suffrage, comprising all Spanish nationals over 18 years of age with full political rights, provided that they have not been deprived of the right to vote by a final sentence. The only exception was in 1977, when this was limited to nationals over 21 years of age and in full enjoyment of their political and civil rights. Amendments in 2011 required non-resident citizens to apply for voting, a system known as "begged" voting (Spanish: Voto rogado). which was abolished in 2022. Further, amendments in 2018 granted the right to vote to those legally incapacitated. The Congress of Deputies has a minimum of 300 and a maximum of 400 seats, with electoral provisions fixing its size at 350. Of these, 348 are elected in 50 multi-member constituencies corresponding to the provinces of Spain—each of which is assigned an initial minimum of two seats and the remaining 248 distributed in proportion to population—using the D'Hondt method and closed-list proportional voting, with a three percent-threshold of valid votes (including blank ballots) in each constituency. The remaining two seats are allocated to Ceuta and Melilla as single-member districts elected by plurality voting. The use of this electoral method may result in a higher effective threshold depending on district magnitude and vote distribution. The law does not provide for by-elections to fill vacant seats; instead, any vacancies arising after the proclamation of candidates and during the legislative term are filled by the next candidates on the party lists or, when required, by designated substitutes.

The electoral law allows for parties and federations registered in the interior ministry, alliances and groupings of electors to present lists of candidates. Parties and federations intending to form an alliance are required to inform the relevant electoral commission within 10 days of the election call—15 before 1985—whereas groupings of electors need to secure the signature of at least one percent of the electorate in the constituencies for which they seek election—one permille of the electorate, with a compulsory minimum of 500 signatures, until 1985—disallowing electors from signing for more than one list. Also since 2011, parties, federations or alliances that have not obtained a mandate in either chamber of the Cortes at the preceding election are required to secure the signature of at least 0.1 percent of electors in the aforementioned constituencies. Amendments in 2007 required a balanced composition of men and women in the electoral lists, so that candidates of either sex made up at least 40 percent of the total composition; further amendments in 2024 required the use of a zipper system.

== Deputies ==
Deputies 1977–present
Key to parties PSOE Cs UCD PP CP AP Vox
| Legislature | Election | Distribution |
| Constituent | 1977 | 1 / 2 / 1 |
| 1st | 1979 | 1 / 3 |
| 2nd | 1982 | 2 / 1 / 1 |
| 3rd | 1986 | 2 / 2 |
| 4th | 1989 | 1 / 2 |
| 5th | 1993 | 1 / 2 |
| 6th | 1996 | 1 / 2 |
| 7th | 2000 | 1 / 2 |
| 8th | 2004 | 1 / 2 |
| 9th | 2008 | 1 / 2 |
| 10th | 2011 | 1 / 2 |
| 11th | 2015 | 1 / 2 |
| 12th | 2016 | 1 / 2 |
| 13th | 2019 (Apr) | 1 / 1 / 1 |
| 14th | 2019 (Nov) | 1 / 1 / 1 |
| 15th | 2023 | 1 / 2 |

== General elections ==
=== 2026 ===
Summary of the 29 November 2026 Congress of Deputies election results in Zamora
| Parties and alliances | Popular vote | | | Seats | |
| Parties and alliances | Votes | % | ±pp | Total | +/− |
|---|---|---|---|---|---|
| People's Party (PP) | | | | | |
| Spanish Socialist Workers' Party (PSOE) | | | | | |
| Vox (Vox) | | | | | |
| Broad Front (FA)^{1} | | | n/a | | |
| We Can (Podemos)^{1} | | | n/a | | |
| Regionalist Party of the Leonese Country (PREPAL) | | | | | |
| Workers' Front (FO) | | | | | |
| Communist Party of the Workers of Spain (PCTE) | | | | | |
| The Party is Over (SALF) | | | New | | |
| Blank ballots | | | | | |
| Total | | | | 3 | ±0 |
| Valid votes | | | | | |
| Invalid votes | | | | | |
| Votes cast / turnout | | | | | |
| Abstentions | | | | | |
| Registered voters | 162,251 | | | | |
Sources
Footnotes: ^{1} Within the Unite alliance in the 2023 election.

=== 2023 ===
Summary of the 23 July 2023 Congress of Deputies election results in Zamora
| Parties and alliances | Popular vote | | | Seats | |
| Parties and alliances | Votes | % | ±pp | Total | +/− |
|---|---|---|---|---|---|
| People's Party (PP) | 46,196 | 44.67 | +11.10 | 2 | +1 |
| Spanish Socialist Workers' Party (PSOE) | 33,601 | 32.49 | –0.33 | 1 | ±0 |
| Vox (Vox) | 13,652 | 13.20 | –3.87 | 0 | –1 |
| Unite (Sumar)^{1} | 5,839 | 5.65 | –1.37 | 0 | ±0 |
| Zamora Yes (ZSí) | 1,843 | 1.78 | New | 0 | ±0 |
| Leonese People's Union (UPL) | 526 | 0.51 | +0.14 | 0 | ±0 |
| Animalist Party with the Environment (PACMA)^{1} | 313 | 0.30 | –0.13 | 0 | ±0 |
| Regionalist Party of the Leonese Country (PREPAL) | 166 | 0.16 | –0.12 | 0 | ±0 |
| Workers' Front (FO) | 121 | 0.12 | New | 0 | ±0 |
| Communist Party of the Workers of Spain (PCTE) | 100 | 0.10 | –0.02 | 0 | ±0 |
| For a Fairer World (PUM+J) | 81 | 0.08 | –0.06 | 0 | ±0 |
| Zero Cuts (Recortes Cero) | 50 | 0.05 | –0.08 | 0 | ±0 |
| Blank ballots | 922 | 0.89 | –0.32 | | |
| Total | 103,410 | | | 3 | ±0 |
| Valid votes | 103,410 | 98.80 | +0.32 | | |
| Invalid votes | 1,261 | 1.20 | –0.32 | | |
| Votes cast / turnout | 104,671 | 64.22 | +4.00 | | |
| Abstentions | 58,327 | 35.78 | –4.00 | | |
| Registered voters | 162,998 | | | | |
Sources
Footnotes: ^{1} Unite results are compared to United We Can totals in the November 2019 election.; ^{2} Animalist Party with the Environment results are compared to Animalist Party Against Mistreatment of Animals totals in the November 2019 election.

=== November 2019 ===
Summary of the 10 November 2019 Congress of Deputies election results in Zamora
| Parties and alliances | Popular vote | | | Seats | |
| Parties and alliances | Votes | % | ±pp | Total | +/− |
|---|---|---|---|---|---|
| People's Party (PP) | 33,495 | 33.57 | +3.97 | 1 | ±0 |
| Spanish Socialist Workers' Party (PSOE) | 32,747 | 32.82 | +1.52 | 1 | ±0 |
| Vox (Vox) | 17,036 | 17.07 | +5.42 | 1 | +1 |
| United We Can (Podemos–IU) | 7,001 | 7.02 | –1.28 | 0 | ±0 |
| Citizens–Party of the Citizenry (Cs) | 6,835 | 6.85 | –10.08 | 0 | –1 |
| Animalist Party Against Mistreatment of Animals (PACMA) | 432 | 0.43 | –0.10 | 0 | ±0 |
| Leonese People's Union (UPL) | 369 | 0.37 | New | 0 | ±0 |
| Regionalist Party of the Leonese Country (PREPAL) | 278 | 0.28 | –0.09 | 0 | ±0 |
| For a Fairer World (PUM+J) | 143 | 0.14 | +0.01 | 0 | ±0 |
| Zero Cuts–Green Group–PCAS–TC (Recortes Cero–GV–PCAS–TC) | 129 | 0.13 | ±0.00 | 0 | ±0 |
| Communist Party of the Workers of Spain (PCTE) | 120 | 0.12 | +0.02 | 0 | ±0 |
| Blank ballots | 1,206 | 1.21 | +0.24 | | |
| Total | 99,791 | | | 3 | ±0 |
| Valid votes | 99,791 | 98.48 | –0.04 | | |
| Invalid votes | 1,543 | 1.52 | +0.04 | | |
| Votes cast / turnout | 101,334 | 60.22 | –6.15 | | |
| Abstentions | 66,934 | 39.78 | +6.15 | | |
| Registered voters | 168,268 | | | | |

=== April 2019 ===
Summary of the 28 April 2019 Congress of Deputies election results in Zamora
| Parties and alliances | Popular vote | | | Seats | |
| Parties and alliances | Votes | % | ±pp | Total | +/− |
|---|---|---|---|---|---|
| Spanish Socialist Workers' Party (PSOE) | 34,628 | 31.30 | +7.38 | 1 | ±0 |
| People's Party (PP) | 32,750 | 29.60 | –18.66 | 1 | –1 |
| Citizens–Party of the Citizenry (Cs) | 18,729 | 16.93 | +5.52 | 1 | +1 |
| Vox (Vox) | 12,887 | 11.65 | New | 0 | ±0 |
| United We Can (Podemos–IU–Equo) | 9,187 | 8.30 | –5.85 | 0 | ±0 |
| Animalist Party Against Mistreatment of Animals (PACMA) | 585 | 0.53 | +0.04 | 0 | ±0 |
| Regionalist Party of the Leonese Country (PREPAL) | 405 | 0.37 | +0.22 | 0 | ±0 |
| Zero Cuts–Green Group–PCAS–TC (Recortes Cero–GV–PCAS–TC) | 147 | 0.13 | –0.03 | 0 | ±0 |
| For a Fairer World (PUM+J) | 141 | 0.13 | New | 0 | ±0 |
| Communist Party of the Workers of Spain (PCTE) | 116 | 0.10 | New | 0 | ±0 |
| Blank ballots | 1,070 | 0.97 | +0.04 | | |
| Total | 110,645 | | | 3 | ±0 |
| Valid votes | 110,645 | 98.52 | –0.17 | | |
| Invalid votes | 1,660 | 1.48 | +0.17 | | |
| Votes cast / turnout | 112,305 | 66.37 | +2.71 | | |
| Abstentions | 56,895 | 33.63 | –2.71 | | |
| Registered voters | 169,200 | | | | |

=== 2016 ===
Summary of the 26 June 2016 Congress of Deputies election results in Zamora
| Parties and alliances | Popular vote | | | Seats | |
| Parties and alliances | Votes | % | ±pp | Total | +/− |
|---|---|---|---|---|---|
| People's Party (PP) | 52,555 | 48.26 | +5.70 | 2 | ±0 |
| Spanish Socialist Workers' Party (PSOE) | 26,045 | 23.92 | +0.96 | 1 | ±0 |
| United We Can (Podemos–IU–Equo–CLI–AS)^{1} | 15,403 | 14.15 | –4.74 | 0 | ±0 |
| Citizens–Party of the Citizenry (C's) | 12,423 | 11.41 | –1.50 | 0 | ±0 |
| Animalist Party Against Mistreatment of Animals (PACMA) | 537 | 0.49 | +0.05 | 0 | ±0 |
| Union, Progress and Democracy (UPyD) | 256 | 0.24 | –0.42 | 0 | ±0 |
| Leonese People's Union (UPL) | 201 | 0.18 | New | 0 | ±0 |
| Zero Cuts–Green Group (Recortes Cero–GV) | 174 | 0.16 | –0.01 | 0 | ±0 |
| Regionalist Party of the Leonese Country (PREPAL) | 158 | 0.15 | –0.07 | 0 | ±0 |
| Communist Party of the Peoples of Spain (PCPE) | 131 | 0.12 | +0.01 | 0 | ±0 |
| Blank ballots | 1,010 | 0.93 | –0.15 | | |
| Total | 108,893 | | | 3 | ±0 |
| Valid votes | 108,893 | 98.69 | +0.03 | | |
| Invalid votes | 1,446 | 1.31 | –0.03 | | |
| Votes cast / turnout | 110,339 | 63.66 | –2.09 | | |
| Abstentions | 62,981 | 36.34 | +2.09 | | |
| Registered voters | 173,320 | | | | |
Sources
Footnotes: ^{1} United We Can results are compared to the combined totals of We Can and United Left–Popular Unity in Common in the 2015 election.

=== 2015 ===
Summary of the 20 December 2015 Congress of Deputies election results in Zamora
| Parties and alliances | Popular vote | | | Seats | |
| Parties and alliances | Votes | % | ±pp | Total | +/− |
|---|---|---|---|---|---|
| People's Party (PP) | 48,160 | 42.56 | –15.20 | 2 | ±0 |
| Spanish Socialist Workers' Party (PSOE) | 25,985 | 22.96 | –6.72 | 1 | ±0 |
| We Can (Podemos) | 15,865 | 14.02 | New | 0 | ±0 |
| Citizens–Party of the Citizenry (C's) | 14,608 | 12.91 | New | 0 | ±0 |
| United Left–Popular Unity in Common (IU–UPeC) | 5,514 | 4.87 | –0.35 | 0 | ±0 |
| Union, Progress and Democracy (UPyD) | 747 | 0.66 | –3.27 | 0 | ±0 |
| Animalist Party Against Mistreatment of Animals (PACMA) | 502 | 0.44 | +0.11 | 0 | ±0 |
| Regionalist Party of the Leonese Country (PREPAL) | 246 | 0.22 | –0.14 | 0 | ±0 |
| Zero Cuts–Green Group (Recortes Cero–GV) | 187 | 0.17 | New | 0 | ±0 |
| Communist Party of the Peoples of Spain (PCPE) | 128 | 0.11 | New | 0 | ±0 |
| Blank ballots | 1,227 | 1.08 | –0.66 | | |
| Total | 113,169 | | | 3 | ±0 |
| Valid votes | 113,169 | 98.66 | +0.03 | | |
| Invalid votes | 1,534 | 1.34 | –0.03 | | |
| Votes cast / turnout | 114,703 | 65.75 | –1.39 | | |
| Abstentions | 59,742 | 34.25 | +1.39 | | |
| Registered voters | 174,445 | | | | |

=== 2011 ===
Summary of the 20 November 2011 Congress of Deputies election results in Zamora
| Parties and alliances | Popular vote | | | Seats | |
| Parties and alliances | Votes | % | ±pp | Total | +/− |
|---|---|---|---|---|---|
| People's Party (PP) | 68,228 | 57.76 | +6.34 | 2 | ±0 |
| Spanish Socialist Workers' Party (PSOE) | 35,059 | 29.68 | –13.10 | 1 | ±0 |
| United Left of Castile and León: Plural Left (IUCyL) | 6,161 | 5.22 | +2.96 | 0 | ±0 |
| Union, Progress and Democracy (UPyD) | 4,641 | 3.93 | +3.00 | 0 | ±0 |
| Blank Seats (EB) | 649 | 0.55 | New | 0 | ±0 |
| Regionalist Party of the Leonese Country (PREPAL) | 429 | 0.36 | –0.01 | 0 | ±0 |
| Animalist Party Against Mistreatment of Animals (PACMA) | 395 | 0.33 | +0.17 | 0 | ±0 |
| For a Fairer World (PUM+J) | 298 | 0.25 | +0.14 | 0 | ±0 |
| Anti-capitalists (Anticapitalistas) | 205 | 0.17 | New | 0 | ±0 |
| Blank ballots | 2,057 | 1.74 | +0.55 | | |
| Total | 118,122 | | | 3 | ±0 |
| Valid votes | 118,122 | 98.63 | –0.23 | | |
| Invalid votes | 1,637 | 1.37 | +0.23 | | |
| Votes cast / turnout | 119,759 | 67.14 | –7.74 | | |
| Abstentions | 58,606 | 32.86 | +7.74 | | |
| Registered voters | 178,365 | | | | |

=== 2008 ===
Summary of the 9 March 2008 Congress of Deputies election results in Zamora
| Parties and alliances | Popular vote | | | Seats | |
| Parties and alliances | Votes | % | ±pp | Total | +/− |
|---|---|---|---|---|---|
| People's Party (PP) | 68,276 | 51.42 | –1.93 | 2 | ±0 |
| Spanish Socialist Workers' Party (PSOE) | 56,793 | 42.78 | +2.85 | 1 | ±0 |
| United Left–Alternative (IU) | 3,002 | 2.26 | –0.25 | 0 | ±0 |
| Union, Progress and Democracy (UPyD) | 1,234 | 0.93 | New | 0 | ±0 |
| Regionalist Party of the Leonese Country (PREPAL) | 491 | 0.37 | –0.06 | 0 | ±0 |
| The Greens of Europe (LVdE) | 381 | 0.29 | New | 0 | ±0 |
| Anti-Bullfighting Party Against Mistreatment of Animals (PACMA) | 211 | 0.16 | New | 0 | ±0 |
| For a Fairer World (PUM+J) | 152 | 0.11 | New | 0 | ±0 |
| Spanish Phalanx of the CNSO (FE de las JONS) | 92 | 0.07 | +0.02 | 0 | ±0 |
| Communist Party of the Castilian People (PCPC–PCPE) | 90 | 0.07 | +0.03 | 0 | ±0 |
| Citizens–Party of the Citizenry (C's) | 89 | 0.07 | New | 0 | ±0 |
| National Democracy (DN) | 80 | 0.06 | +0.02 | 0 | ±0 |
| Liberal Centrist Union (UCL) | 80 | 0.06 | –0.04 | 0 | ±0 |
| Humanist Party (PH) | 76 | 0.06 | New | 0 | ±0 |
| Commoners' Land (TC) | 68 | 0.05 | –0.02 | 0 | ±0 |
| Centrist Party (PCTR) | 40 | 0.03 | New | 0 | ±0 |
| Spanish Alternative (AES) | 36 | 0.03 | New | 0 | ±0 |
| Blank ballots | 1,580 | 1.19 | –0.69 | | |
| Total | 132,771 | | | 3 | ±0 |
| Valid votes | 132,771 | 98.86 | –0.30 | | |
| Invalid votes | 1,526 | 1.14 | +0.30 | | |
| Votes cast / turnout | 134,297 | 74.88 | +0.44 | | |
| Abstentions | 45,058 | 25.12 | –0.44 | | |
| Registered voters | 179,355 | | | | |

=== 2004 ===
Summary of the 14 March 2004 Congress of Deputies election results in Zamora
| Parties and alliances | Popular vote | | | Seats | |
| Parties and alliances | Votes | % | ±pp | Total | +/− |
|---|---|---|---|---|---|
| People's Party (PP) | 71,821 | 53.35 | –5.48 | 2 | ±0 |
| Spanish Socialist Workers' Party (PSOE) | 53,757 | 39.93 | +7.49 | 1 | ±0 |
| United Left (IU) | 3,375 | 2.51 | –0.33 | 0 | ±0 |
| United Zamora (ZU) | 754 | 0.56 | New | 0 | ±0 |
| Leonese People's Union (UPL) | 754 | 0.56 | New | 0 | ±0 |
| Salamanca–Zamora–León–PREPAL (PREPAL) | 578 | 0.43 | –0.37 | 0 | ±0 |
| Democratic and Social Centre (CDS) | 194 | 0.14 | –0.74 | 0 | ±0 |
| Citizens for Blank Votes (CenB) | 190 | 0.14 | New | 0 | ±0 |
| Liberal Centrist Union (UCL) | 140 | 0.10 | New | 0 | ±0 |
| Family and Life Party (PFyV) | 122 | 0.09 | New | 0 | ±0 |
| Commoners' Land–Castilian Nationalist Party (TC–PNC) | 92 | 0.07 | –0.07 | 0 | ±0 |
| Spanish Phalanx of the CNSO (FE de las JONS) | 62 | 0.05 | New | 0 | ±0 |
| Authentic Phalanx (FA) | 62 | 0.05 | New | 0 | ±0 |
| Communist Party of the Castilian People (PCPC–PCPE) | 55 | 0.04 | New | 0 | ±0 |
| National Democracy (DN) | 55 | 0.04 | New | 0 | ±0 |
| The Phalanx (FE) | 52 | 0.04 | –0.08 | 0 | ±0 |
| Republican Social Movement (MSR) | 38 | 0.03 | New | 0 | ±0 |
| Blank ballots | 2,525 | 1.88 | +0.16 | | |
| Total | 134,626 | | | 3 | ±0 |
| Valid votes | 134,626 | 99.16 | +0.18 | | |
| Invalid votes | 1,142 | 0.84 | –0.18 | | |
| Votes cast / turnout | 135,768 | 74.44 | +4.71 | | |
| Abstentions | 46,611 | 25.56 | –4.71 | | |
| Registered voters | 182,379 | | | | |

=== 2000 ===
Summary of the 12 March 2000 Congress of Deputies election results in Zamora
| Parties and alliances | Popular vote | | | Seats | |
| Parties and alliances | Votes | % | ±pp | Total | +/− |
|---|---|---|---|---|---|
| People's Party (PP) | 75,268 | 58.83 | +4.82 | 2 | ±0 |
| Spanish Socialist Workers' Party–Progressives (PSOE–p) | 41,498 | 32.44 | –4.54 | 1 | ±0 |
| United Left (IU) | 3,637 | 2.84 | –2.78 | 0 | ±0 |
| Zamoran People's Union (UPZ) | 2,347 | 1.83 | New | 0 | ±0 |
| Centrist Union–Democratic and Social Centre (UC–CDS) | 1,129 | 0.88 | –0.18 | 0 | ±0 |
| Salamanca–Zamora–León–PREPAL (PREPAL) | 1,028 | 0.80 | +0.19 | 0 | ±0 |
| Regionalist Unity of Castile and León (URCL) | 231 | 0.18 | +0.05 | 0 | ±0 |
| Natural Law Party (PLN) | 204 | 0.16 | New | 0 | ±0 |
| Commoners' Land–Castilian Nationalist Party (TC–PNC) | 176 | 0.14 | +0.08 | 0 | ±0 |
| The Phalanx (FE) | 150 | 0.12 | New | 0 | ±0 |
| Spain 2000 Platform (ES2000) | 71 | 0.06 | New | 0 | ±0 |
| Blank ballots | 2,196 | 1.72 | +0.52 | | |
| Total | 127,935 | | | 3 | ±0 |
| Valid votes | 127,935 | 98.98 | –0.28 | | |
| Invalid votes | 1,323 | 1.02 | +0.28 | | |
| Votes cast / turnout | 129,258 | 69.73 | –7.48 | | |
| Abstentions | 56,107 | 30.27 | +7.48 | | |
| Registered voters | 185,365 | | | | |

=== 1996 ===
Summary of the 3 March 1996 Congress of Deputies election results in Zamora
| Parties and alliances | Popular vote | | | Seats | |
| Parties and alliances | Votes | % | ±pp | Total | +/− |
|---|---|---|---|---|---|
| People's Party (PP) | 75,223 | 54.01 | +4.52 | 2 | ±0 |
| Spanish Socialist Workers' Party (PSOE) | 51,509 | 36.98 | –2.53 | 1 | ±0 |
| United Left of Castile and León (IUCL) | 7,824 | 5.62 | +1.21 | 0 | ±0 |
| Centrist Union (UC) | 1,473 | 1.06 | –2.38 | 0 | ±0 |
| Salamanca–Zamora–León–PREPAL (PREPAL) | 850 | 0.61 | +0.23 | 0 | ±0 |
| Inter-Zamoran Party (PIZ) | 215 | 0.15 | New | 0 | ±0 |
| Regionalist Unity of Castile and León (URCL) | 184 | 0.13 | –0.09 | 0 | ±0 |
| Humanist Party (PH) | 132 | 0.09 | +0.04 | 0 | ±0 |
| Workers' Revolutionary Party (PRT) | 108 | 0.08 | New | 0 | ±0 |
| Commoners' Land–Castilian Nationalist Party (TC–PNC) | 77 | 0.06 | +0.01 | 0 | ±0 |
| Blank ballots | 1,677 | 1.20 | +0.15 | | |
| Total | 139,272 | | | 3 | ±0 |
| Valid votes | 139,272 | 99.26 | –0.08 | | |
| Invalid votes | 1,035 | 0.74 | +0.08 | | |
| Votes cast / turnout | 140,307 | 77.21 | +0.62 | | |
| Abstentions | 41,426 | 22.79 | –0.62 | | |
| Registered voters | 181,733 | | | | |

=== 1993 ===
Summary of the 6 June 1993 Congress of Deputies election results in Zamora
| Parties and alliances | Popular vote | | | Seats | |
| Parties and alliances | Votes | % | ±pp | Total | +/− |
|---|---|---|---|---|---|
| People's Party (PP) | 67,597 | 49.49 | +6.80 | 2 | ±0 |
| Spanish Socialist Workers' Party (PSOE) | 53,965 | 39.51 | +1.58 | 1 | ±0 |
| United Left of Castile and León (IU) | 6,027 | 4.41 | +0.43 | 0 | ±0 |
| Democratic and Social Centre (CDS) | 4,703 | 3.44 | –8.08 | 0 | ±0 |
| The Greens (LV)^{1} | 747 | 0.55 | +0.06 | 0 | ±0 |
| Regionalist Party of the Leonese Country (PREPAL) | 521 | 0.38 | –0.05 | 0 | ±0 |
| Ruiz-Mateos Group–European Democratic Alliance (ARM–ADE) | 421 | 0.31 | –0.47 | 0 | ±0 |
| The Ecologists (LE) | 352 | 0.26 | –0.15 | 0 | ±0 |
| Regionalist Unity of Castile and León (URCL) | 296 | 0.22 | New | 0 | ±0 |
| Leonese People's Union (UPL) | 130 | 0.10 | New | 0 | ±0 |
| Spanish Phalanx of the CNSO (FE–JONS) | 113 | 0.08 | New | 0 | ±0 |
| Party of El Bierzo (PB) | 74 | 0.05 | New | 0 | ±0 |
| Commoners' Land–Castilian Nationalist Party (TC–PNC) | 74 | 0.05 | New | 0 | ±0 |
| Humanist Party (PH) | 69 | 0.05 | New | 0 | ±0 |
| Natural Law Party (PLN) | 63 | 0.05 | New | 0 | ±0 |
| Communist Unification of Spain (UCE) | 0 | 0.00 | New | 0 | ±0 |
| Blank ballots | 1,437 | 1.05 | +0.17 | | |
| Total | 136,589 | | | 3 | ±0 |
| Valid votes | 136,589 | 99.34 | +0.24 | | |
| Invalid votes | 903 | 0.66 | –0.24 | | |
| Votes cast / turnout | 137,492 | 76.59 | +4.47 | | |
| Abstentions | 42,036 | 23.41 | –4.47 | | |
| Registered voters | 179,528 | | | | |
Sources
Footnotes: ^{1} The Greens results are compared to The Greens–Green List totals in the 1989 election.

=== 1989 ===
Summary of the 29 October 1989 Congress of Deputies election results in Zamora
| Parties and alliances | Popular vote | | | Seats | |
| Parties and alliances | Votes | % | ±pp | Total | +/− |
|---|---|---|---|---|---|
| People's Party (PP)^{1} | 54,821 | 42.69 | +1.79 | 2 | ±0 |
| Spanish Socialist Workers' Party (PSOE) | 48,712 | 37.93 | +0.44 | 1 | –1 |
| Democratic and Social Centre (CDS) | 14,791 | 11.52 | –3.53 | 0 | ±0 |
| United Left (IU) | 5,111 | 3.98 | +2.09 | 0 | ±0 |
| Ruiz-Mateos Group (Ruiz-Mateos) | 1,003 | 0.78 | New | 0 | ±0 |
| The Greens–Green List (LV–LV) | 633 | 0.49 | New | 0 | ±0 |
| Regionalist Party of the Leonese Country (PREPAL) | 553 | 0.43 | –0.01 | 0 | ±0 |
| The Ecologist Greens (LVE) | 526 | 0.41 | New | 0 | ±0 |
| Workers' Socialist Party (PST) | 462 | 0.36 | –0.18 | 0 | ±0 |
| Workers' Party of Spain–Communist Unity (PTE–UC)^{2} | 288 | 0.22 | –0.38 | 0 | ±0 |
| Alliance for the Republic (AxR) | 209 | 0.16 | New | 0 | ±0 |
| Communist Party of the Peoples of Spain (PCPE) | 171 | 0.13 | New | 0 | ±0 |
| Blank ballots | 1,131 | 0.88 | –0.03 | | |
| Total | 128,411 | | | 3 | –1 |
| Valid votes | 128,411 | 99.10 | +1.35 | | |
| Invalid votes | 1,171 | 0.90 | –1.35 | | |
| Votes cast / turnout | 129,582 | 72.12 | +2.05 | | |
| Abstentions | 50,094 | 27.88 | –2.05 | | |
| Registered voters | 179,676 | | | | |
Sources
Footnotes: ^{1} People's Party results are compared to People's Coalition totals in the 1986 election.; ^{2} Workers' Party of Spain–Communist Unity results are compared to Communists' Unity Board totals in the 1986 election.

=== 1986 ===
Summary of the 22 June 1986 Congress of Deputies election results in Zamora
| Parties and alliances | Popular vote | | | Seats | |
| Parties and alliances | Votes | % | ±pp | Total | +/− |
|---|---|---|---|---|---|
| People's Coalition (AP–PDP–PL)^{1} | 52,844 | 40.90 | +5.04 | 2 | +1 |
| Spanish Socialist Workers' Party (PSOE) | 48,436 | 37.49 | +1.41 | 2 | ±0 |
| Democratic and Social Centre (CDS) | 19,444 | 15.05 | +10.61 | 0 | ±0 |
| United Left (IU)^{2} | 2,440 | 1.89 | +0.86 | 0 | ±0 |
| Democratic Reformist Party (PRD) | 1,405 | 1.09 | New | 0 | ±0 |
| Communists' Unity Board (MUC) | 771 | 0.60 | New | 0 | ±0 |
| Workers' Socialist Party (PST) | 704 | 0.54 | –0.01 | 0 | ±0 |
| Regionalist Party of the Leonese Country (PREPAL) | 574 | 0.44 | –0.56 | 0 | ±0 |
| Communist Unification of Spain (UCE) | 391 | 0.30 | +0.03 | 0 | ±0 |
| Spanish Phalanx of the CNSO (FE–JONS) | 312 | 0.24 | New | 0 | ±0 |
| Leonese Convergence (CL) | 271 | 0.21 | New | 0 | ±0 |
| Republican Popular Unity (UPR) | 238 | 0.18 | New | 0 | ±0 |
| Party of the Communists of Catalonia (PCC) | 180 | 0.14 | New | 0 | ±0 |
| Union of the Democratic Centre (UCD) | n/a | n/a | –18.66 | 0 | –1 |
| Blank ballots | 1,181 | 0.91 | –0.12 | | |
| Total | 129,191 | | | 4 | ±0 |
| Valid votes | 129,191 | 97.75 | +2.57 | | |
| Invalid votes | 2,970 | 2.25 | –2.57 | | |
| Votes cast / turnout | 132,161 | 70.07 | –7.18 | | |
| Abstentions | 56,454 | 29.93 | +7.18 | | |
| Registered voters | 188,615 | | | | |
Sources
Footnotes: ^{1} People's Coalition results are compared to People's Alliance–People's Democratic Party totals in the 1982 election.; ^{2} United Left results are compared to Communist Party of Spain totals in the 1982 election.

=== 1982 ===
Summary of the 28 October 1982 Congress of Deputies election results in Zamora
| Parties and alliances | Popular vote | | | Seats | |
| Parties and alliances | Votes | % | ±pp | Total | +/− |
|---|---|---|---|---|---|
| Spanish Socialist Workers' Party (PSOE) | 47,804 | 36.08 | +13.59 | 2 | +1 |
| People's Alliance–People's Democratic Party (AP–PDP)^{1} | 47,504 | 35.86 | +19.62 | 1 | +1 |
| Union of the Democratic Centre (UCD) | 24,725 | 18.66 | –31.91 | 1 | –2 |
| Democratic and Social Centre (CDS) | 5,880 | 4.44 | New | 0 | ±0 |
| Communist Party of Spain (PCE) | 1,368 | 1.03 | –1.88 | 0 | ±0 |
| Regionalist Party of the Leonese Country (PREPAL) | 1,322 | 1.00 | New | 0 | ±0 |
| New Force (FN)^{2} | 1,001 | 0.76 | –0.99 | 0 | ±0 |
| Workers' Socialist Party (PST) | 731 | 0.55 | New | 0 | ±0 |
| Communist Unification of Spain (UCE) | 354 | 0.27 | New | 0 | ±0 |
| Spanish Solidarity (SE) | 266 | 0.20 | New | 0 | ±0 |
| Revolutionary Communist League (LCR) | 144 | 0.11 | New | 0 | ±0 |
| Communist Movement of Castile and León (MC–CL) | 11 | 0.01 | –0.46 | 0 | ±0 |
| Socialist Party (PS) | 0 | 0.00 | New | 0 | ±0 |
| Blank ballots | 1,368 | 1.03 | +0.30 | | |
| Total | 132,478 | | | 4 | ±0 |
| Valid votes | 132,478 | 95.18 | –2.80 | | |
| Invalid votes | 6,715 | 4.82 | +2.80 | | |
| Votes cast / turnout | 139,193 | 77.25 | +8.69 | | |
| Abstentions | 40,997 | 22.75 | –8.69 | | |
| Registered voters | 180,190 | | | | |
Sources
Footnotes: ^{1} People's Alliance–People's Democratic Party results are compared to Democratic Coalition totals in the 1979 election.; ^{2} New Force results are compared to National Union totals in the 1979 election.

=== 1979 ===
Summary of the 1 March 1979 Congress of Deputies election results in Zamora
| Parties and alliances | Popular vote | | | Seats | |
| Parties and alliances | Votes | % | ±pp | Total | +/− |
|---|---|---|---|---|---|
| Union of the Democratic Centre (UCD) | 61,025 | 50.57 | +3.98 | 3 | +1 |
| Spanish Socialist Workers' Party (PSOE)^{1} | 27,143 | 22.49 | +0.34 | 1 | ±0 |
| Democratic Coalition (CD)^{2} | 19,603 | 16.24 | –7.33 | 0 | –1 |
| Communist Party of Spain (PCE) | 3,506 | 2.91 | +0.77 | 0 | ±0 |
| Liberal Party (PL) | 2,458 | 2.04 | New | 0 | ±0 |
| National Union (UN) | 2,111 | 1.75 | New | 0 | ±0 |
| Spanish Ruralist Party (PRE) | 1,076 | 0.89 | New | 0 | ±0 |
| Party of Labour of Spain (PTE) | 591 | 0.49 | New | 0 | ±0 |
| Communist Movement–Organization of Communist Left (MC–OIC) | 563 | 0.47 | New | 0 | ±0 |
| Workers' Communist Party (PCT) | 488 | 0.40 | New | 0 | ±0 |
| Workers' Revolutionary Organization (ORT) | 463 | 0.38 | New | 0 | ±0 |
| Spanish Phalanx of the CNSO (Authentic) (FE–JONS(A)) | 400 | 0.33 | New | 0 | ±0 |
| Communist Organization of Spain (Red Flag) (OCE–BR) | 372 | 0.31 | New | 0 | ±0 |
| Blank ballots | 881 | 0.73 | +0.27 | | |
| Total | 120,680 | | | 4 | ±0 |
| Valid votes | 120,680 | 97.98 | +0.42 | | |
| Invalid votes | 2,493 | 2.02 | –0.42 | | |
| Votes cast / turnout | 123,173 | 68.56 | –12.43 | | |
| Abstentions | 56,480 | 31.44 | +12.43 | | |
| Registered voters | 179,653 | | | | |
Sources
Footnotes: ^{1} Spanish Socialist Workers' Party results are compared to the combined totals of Spanish Socialist Workers' Party and People's Socialist Party–Socialist Unity in the 1977 election.; ^{2} Democratic Coalition results are compared to People's Alliance totals in the 1977 election.

=== 1977 ===
Summary of the 15 June 1977 Congress of Deputies election results in Zamora
| Parties and alliances | Popular vote | | | Seats | |
| Parties and alliances | Votes | % | ±pp | Total | +/− |
|---|---|---|---|---|---|
| Union of the Democratic Centre (UCD) | 60,626 | 46.59 | n/a | 2 | n/a |
| People's Alliance (AP) | 30,677 | 23.57 | n/a | 1 | n/a |
| Spanish Socialist Workers' Party (PSOE) | 26,225 | 20.15 | n/a | 1 | n/a |
| Federation of Christian Democracy (FPD–ID) | 5,110 | 3.93 | n/a | 0 | n/a |
| Communist Party of Spain (PCE) | 2,783 | 2.14 | n/a | 0 | n/a |
| People's Socialist Party–Socialist Unity (PSP–US) | 2,597 | 2.00 | n/a | 0 | n/a |
| Democratic Socialist Alliance (ASDCI) | 1,516 | 1.16 | n/a | 0 | n/a |
| Blank ballots | 600 | 0.46 | n/a | | |
| Total | 130,134 | | | 4 | n/a |
| Valid votes | 130,134 | 97.56 | n/a | | |
| Invalid votes | 3,256 | 2.44 | n/a | | |
| Votes cast / turnout | 133,390 | 80.99 | n/a | | |
| Abstentions | 31,316 | 19.01 | n/a | | |
| Registered voters | 164,706 | | | | |

== Bibliography ==
- Ley 1/1977, de 4 de enero, para la Reforma Política (Fundamental Law 1/1977). Official State Gazette (in Spanish). 4 January 1977. BOE-A-1977-165.
- Real Decreto-ley 20/1977, de 18 de marzo, sobre Normas Electorales (Royal Decree-Law 20/1977). Official State Gazette (in Spanish). 18 March 1977. BOE-A-1977-7445.
- Constitución Española (Constitution). Official State Gazette (in Spanish). 27 December 1978. BOE-A-1978-31229.
- Ley Orgánica 5/1985, de 19 de junio, del Régimen Electoral General (Organic Law 5/1985). Official State Gazette (in Spanish). 19 June 1985. BOE-A-1985-11672.
- Carreras de Odriozola, Albert; Tafunell Sambola, Xavier (2005) [1989]. Estadísticas históricas de España, siglos XIX-XX (PDF) (in Spanish). Vol. 1 (II ed.). Bilbao: Fundación BBVA. pp. 1072–1097. ISBN 84-96515-00-1. Archived from the original (PDF) on 24 September 2015.
