= Zamora Sí =

- President: Eloy Tomé
- Founder: Francisco Requejo
- Founded: 9 February 2012
- Split from: Citizens
- Ideology: Localism
- Municipal councillors in the Province of Zamora: 100 / 1,480
- Mayors in the Province of Zamora: 11 / 248
- Provincial Deputation of Zamora: 1 / 25

Website
- http://www.zamorasi.com/

Zamora Sí (ZSí; lit. 'Zamora Yes') is a Spanish political party in the Province of Zamora, in the autonomous community of Castile and León.

The party was founded by former Citizens member Francisco Requejo in 2023 and won the third-most councillors in the province in that year's local elections, taking 100 including 11 mayors. It took two seats in the city of Zamora and one on the provincial deputation. Requejo quit politics at the end of the year, and was succeeded as leader by Eloy Tomé.

== History ==
Zamora Sí was founded by Francisco Requejo, incumbent president of the Provincial Deputation of the Province of Zamora and city councillor in the city of Zamora from the Citizens party. It was presented on 9 February 2023 in the city of Zamora, at an event attended by 300 people including Luis Fuentes, former President of the Cortes of Castile and León from Citizens.

Requejo had turned down the offer to run in second place on the People's Party (PP) list for Zamora City Council in the 2023 local elections in order to found the party. He said at its launch that he had held negotiations with Citizens and with localist party Ahora Decide. He officially left Citizens on 16 February 2023, while holding his offices as an independent.

In the 2023 elections, taking place 109 days after the party was launched, it finished as the third-largest in the province by number of councillors after the PP and the Spanish Socialist Workers' Party (PSOE). The party elected 100 and took 10 mayors' offices on the night, later rising to 11. The result allowed it to take one seat on the provincial deputation.

Two members, Requejo and Eloy Tomé, were elected to Zamora City Council, but it had a left-leaning majority from the PSOE and United Left, leaving Zamora Sí in opposition. In the provincial deputation, the PP won an absolute majority, meaning that Requejo went from being the president to sitting in opposition.

In the 2023 Spanish general election, the party ran a list for the Congress of Deputies and for the Senate of Spain, in the respective Zamora constituencies. Tomé ran for Congress, finishing far from achieving a seat.

On 26 December 2023, Requejo left for personal reasons, handing the party leadership and provincial deputation seat to 32-year-old Tomé. Lead senate candidate Rocío Ferrero took his place on the city council.
