= Francisco Requejo =

Spanish politician

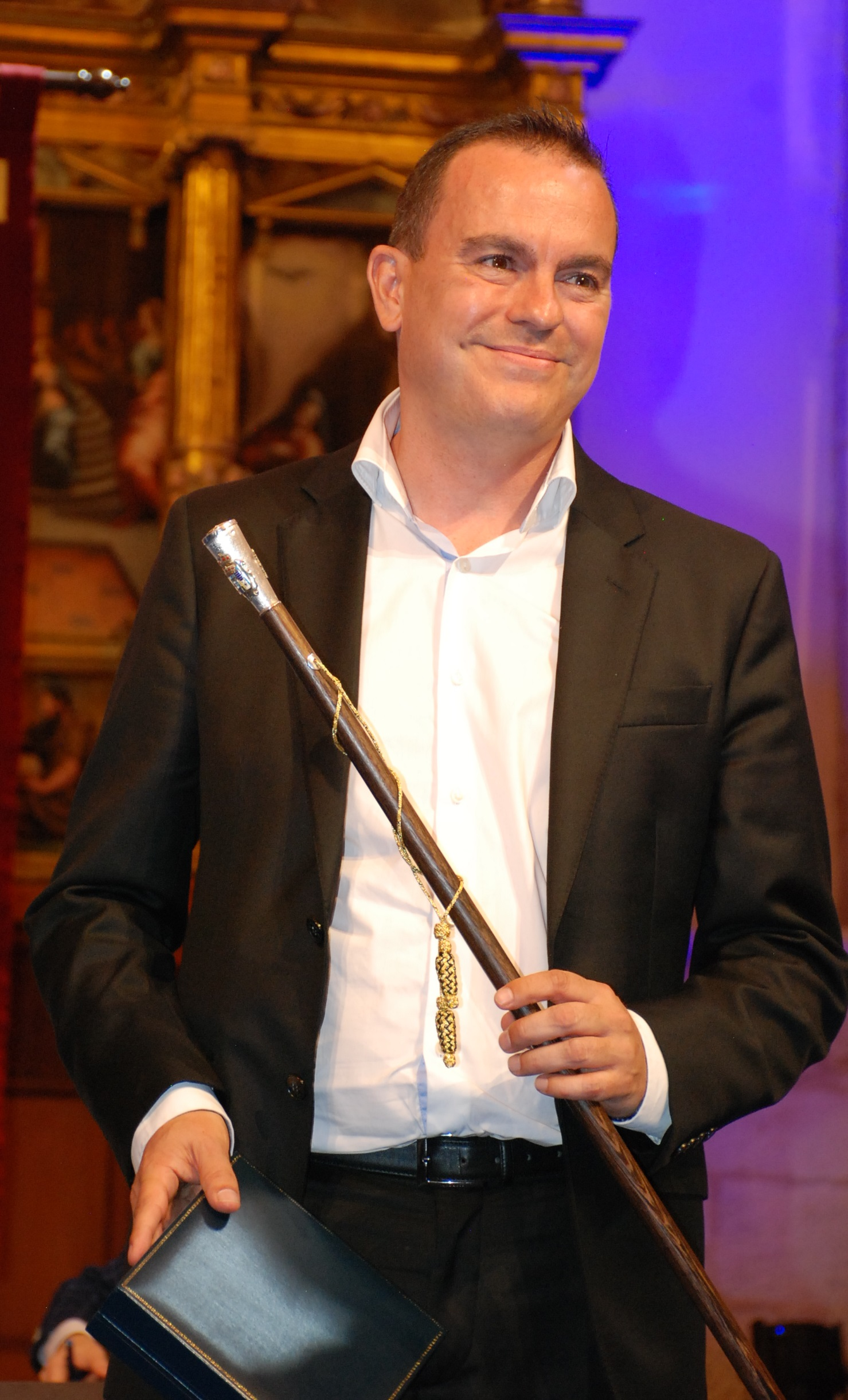
- Requejo in 2019

President Diputación of Zamora
- Incumbent
- Assumed office 28 June 2019
- Preceded by: Maite Martín Pozo

Personal details
- Born: Francisco José Requejo Rodríguez; 17 April 1972 (age 53) Zamora, Spain
- Party: Citizens
- Occupation: Politician

Francisco José Requejo Rodríguez (born 17 April 1972) is a Spanish politician and businessman. Francisco Requejo is a member of the Citizens and is the highest provincial leader of Zamora, as president of the Zamora Provincial Council.
