= 2016 Spanish general election =

- 26 June 2016

All 350 seats in the Congress of Deputies and 208 (of 266) seats in the Senate 176 seats needed for a majority in the Congress of Deputies
- Opinion polls
- Registered: 36,520,913 ▲0.0%
- Turnout: 24,279,259 (66.5%) ▼3.2 pp
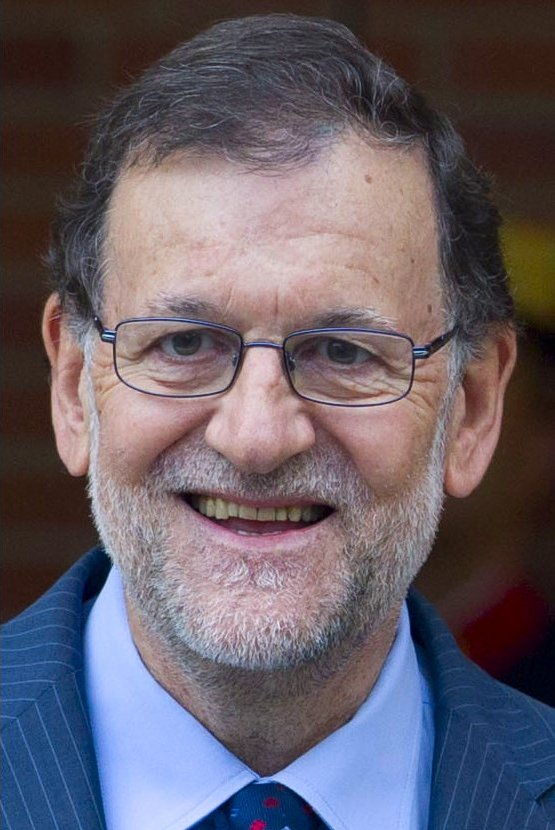

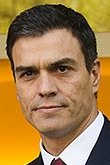

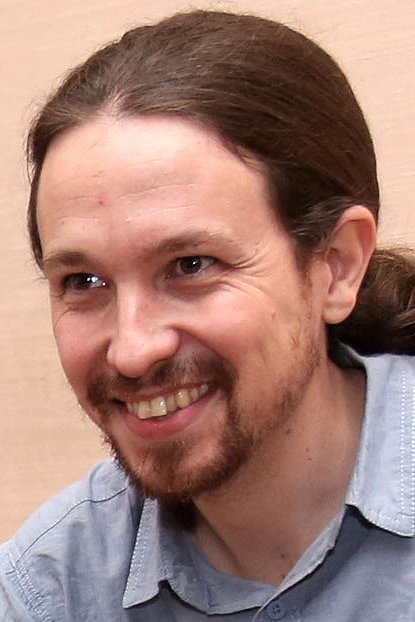

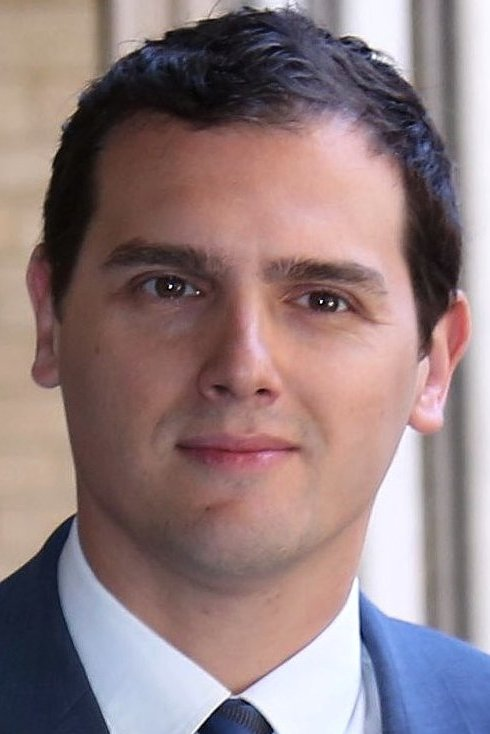

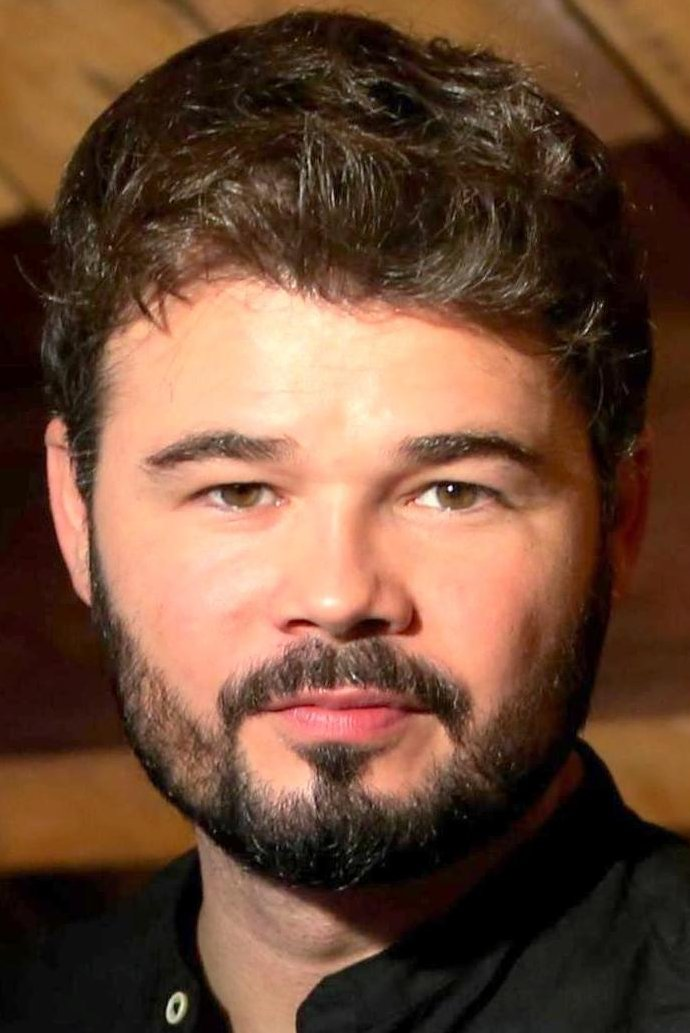

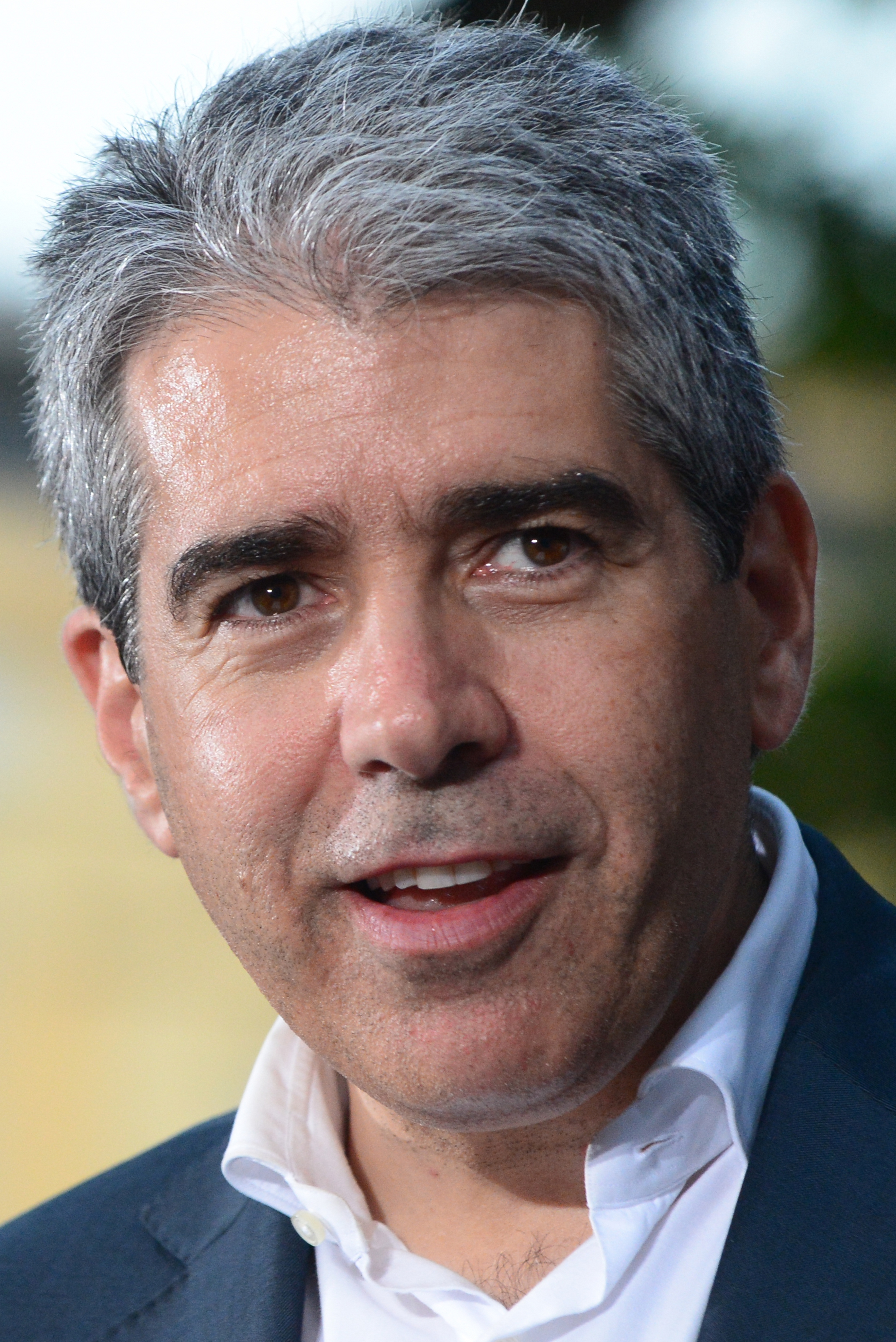
	First party	Second party	Third party
Leader	Mariano Rajoy	Pedro Sánchez	Pablo Iglesias
Party	PP	PSOE	Unidos Podemos (Note: Total figures include results for En Comú Podem, A la valenciana and En Marea.)
Leader since	2 September 2003	26 July 2014	15 November 2014
Leader's seat	Madrid	Madrid	Madrid
Last election	123 seats, 28.7%	90 seats, 22.0%	71 seats, 24.5% (Note: Results for Podemos–ECP–És el moment–En Marea (20.7%, 69 deputies), IU–UPeC (3.7%, 2 deputies) and Més (0.1%, 0 deputies) in the 2015 Congress election.)
Seats won	137	85	71
Seat change	▲14	▼5	0
Popular vote	7,941,236	5,443,846	5,087,538
Percentage	33.0%	22.6%	21.2%
Swing	▲4.3 pp	▲0.6 pp	▼3.3 pp
	Fourth party	Fifth party	Sixth party
Leader	Albert Rivera	Gabriel Rufián	Francesc Homs
Party	C's	ERC–CatSí	CDC
Leader since	9 July 2006	7 November 2015	6 November 2015
Leader's seat	Madrid	Barcelona	Barcelona
Last election	40 seats, 13.9%	9 seats, 2.4%	8 seats, 2.2% (Note: Results for DiL in the 2015 election.)
Seats won	32	9	8
Seat change	▼8	0	0
Popular vote	3,141,570	639,652	483,488
Percentage	13.1%	2.7%	2.0%
Swing	▼0.8 pp	▲0.3 pp	▼0.2 pp
Prime Minister before election
Mariano Rajoy (acting)
PP
Prime Minister after election
Mariano Rajoy
PP

A general election was held in Spain on 26 June 2016 to elect the members of the 12th Cortes Generales under the Spanish Constitution of 1978. All 350 seats in the Congress of Deputies were up for election, as well as 208 of 266 seats in the Senate. It was a repeat election under the provisions of Article 99.5 of the Constitution, as a result of the failure in government formation negotiations following the previous general election (and the first time a nationwide election was held in Spain under this procedure).

The 2015 election had resulted in the most fragmented parliament since 1977 up to that point, with no party or bloc securing an overall majority. Parliamentary arithmetics prompted the People's Party (PP) of the acting prime minister, Mariano Rajoy, to reject an investiture bid to avoid certain defeat. The Spanish Socialist Workers' Party (PSOE) under Pedro Sánchez was invited by King Felipe VI to form a government instead, securing the support of the liberal Citizens (C's) party of Albert Rivera, but opposition by the anti-austerity Podemos leader, Pablo Iglesias, thwarted Sánchez's bid. The ensuing political deadlock and failure in government negotiations forced a repeat election being called for 26 June. Podemos joined with United Left into the Unidos Podemos alliance, along with several other minor left-wing parties. Opinion polls going into the election predicted a growing polarization between this alliance and the PP, which would be fighting to maintain first place nationally.

Despite ongoing political scandals (which had seen resignations amid the Púnica affair and the Panama leaks, and the unveiling of Operation Catalonia), the PP benefitted from the political uncertainty and increased its margin of victory, whereas the Unidos Podemos alliance unexpectedly lost support—in what was seen as voter punishment to its hardline stance during government negotiations—thwarting Iglesias's aim to overcome Sánchez's PSOE (the so-called sorpasso), which clung on to second place despite scoring a new historical low. The C's party suffered from the electoral system as well as from tactical voting to the PP, but slightly improved on the most pessimistic last-minute expectations that placed it below 30 seats. Overall, a potential PP–C's bloc gained six more seats but still remained short of a majority, whereas the prospective left-wing bloc lost ground and remained more dependant on peripheral nationalist parties than before. With a new deadlock settling in, commentators suggested that a new, third election could be eventually needed.

Electoral setbacks for the PSOE in the Basque and Galician elections in September 2016 unleashed a party crisis that led to Sánchez's ouster as leader. Party rebels appointed a provisional leadership, which chose to abstain to allow Rajoy to form a minority government amid public outcry and protest at PSOE's U-turn (which also saw a number of its lawmakers breaking party discipline and voting against Rajoy nonetheless). Rajoy's second government would only last for 20 months until June 2018, as erosion from the ensuing Catalan crisis, the emergence of new scandals and judicial blows to his ruling PP would prompt Sánchez—who would secure re-election as PSOE leader in June 2017—to bring him down in a no-confidence vote.

== Background ==
The 2015 general election produced the most fragmented Spanish parliament since 1977, with neither of the two main alliances—the conservative People's Party (PP) with liberal Citizens (C's), or the Spanish Socialist Workers' Party (PSOE) with anti-austerity Podemos—having enough seats to form a majority without the support of peripheral nationalist parties. At the same time, the possibility of a grand coalition between PP and PSOE (unprecedented in Spain) was firmly rejected by the latter. A political deadlock followed as acting prime minister and PP leader, Mariano Rajoy, declined King Felipe VI's invitation to attempt investiture because he lacked enough support, leading to PSOE leader Pedro Sánchez being nominated instead after Podemos's Pablo Iglesias offered to join a left-wing coalition government.

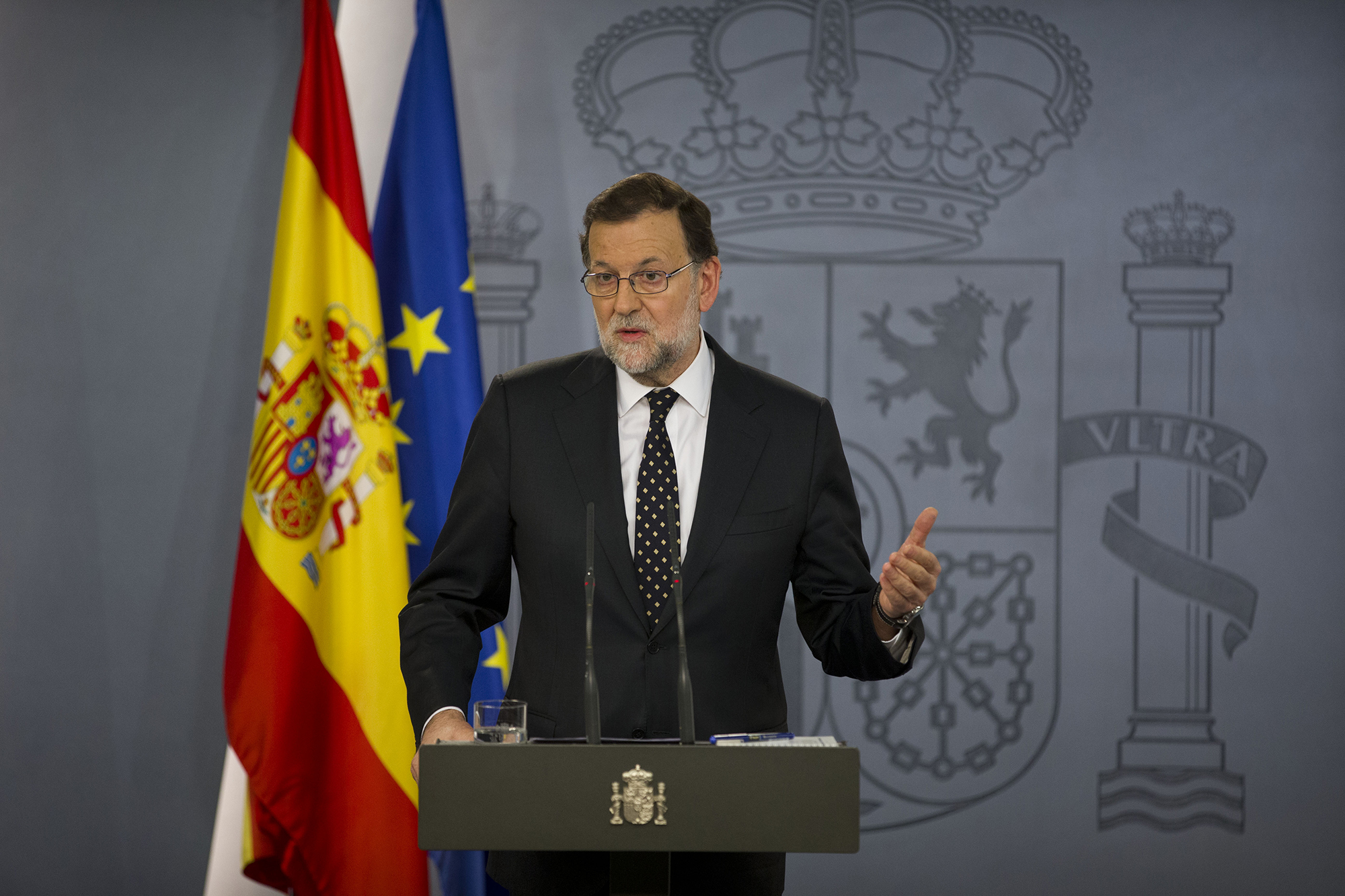
On 22 January 2016, acting Prime Minister Mariano Rajoy turned down King Felipe VI's invitation to form a government, triggering a political deadlock.

Sánchez managed to fend off an internal challenge to his leadership, while a faction within the PSOE discouraged any pact with Podemos because of the party's sympathies to the Catalan independence movement. The PSOE also rejected Podemos's demands for ministerial posts and its condition that C's be excluded from negotiations. In the end, Sánchez reached an agreement with Albert Rivera in an attempt to outmanoeuvre Iglesias and garner cross-party support, despite the alliance controlling only 130 of the 350 seats in Congress. This PSOE–C's deal was rejected by Podemos as incompatible with its programme, leading to a breakdown in negotiations. With opposition from all other parties, Sánchez's investiture bid was defeated 219–131 on 4 March 2016.

Concurrently, corruption scandals continued to affect the ruling PP. One party lawmaker was expelled over a kickbacks-for-contracts scheme, while an investigation into alleged bid rigging at the state-run water contract company Acuamed led to the resignation of the presidency undersecretary. The party's Valencian branch was also accused of widespread corruption in the so-called Taula affair involving dozens of politicians, including figures close to former Valencia mayor Rita Barberá. The Púnica affair brought a police raid on the PP's headquarters in Madrid over illegal financing allegations and led to Esperanza Aguirre's resignation as regional party leader. April 2016 saw the arrest of the PP mayor of Granada in a real-estate corruption probe; the resignation of the industry minister, José Manuel Soria, after being implicated in the Panama leaks; and former prime minister José María Aznar being ordered to pay €270,000 in fines and back taxes. In June 2016, leaked recordings implicated the interior minister, Jorge Fernández Díaz, in an alleged plot to fabricate scandals against pro-Catalan independence politicians. Rajoy's caretaker government was also taken to court for refusing parliamentary oversight, while reports that Spain had missed its 2015 deficit target forced him to acknowledge the need for further austerity measures to meet European Union requirements.

After Sánchez's failed investiture, the PSOE tried to secure at least Podemos's abstention. Internal divisions emerged within Podemos between supporters of Iglesias's hardline negotiating stance (pablistas) and those aligned with his deputy Íñigo Errejón (errejonistas), who favoured allowing a PSOE-led government; this conflict led to several resignations in the party's Madrid branch. Attempts to form a three-way agreement with C's failed because of deep mutual distrust, while Rajoy kept dismissing the possibility of forming a government himself under the existing parliamentary numbers. A last attempt by the Valencianist party Compromís to form a left-wing coalition of independents was also rejected by Podemos, ultimately leading to a snap election being called for 26 June 2016 amid mutual accusations among the parties.

== Overview ==
Under the 1978 Constitution, the Spanish Cortes Generales were conceived as an imperfect bicameral system. The Congress of Deputies held greater legislative power than the Senate, having the ability to grant or withdraw confidence from a prime minister and to override Senate vetoes by an absolute majority. Nonetheless, the Senate retained a limited number of specific functions—such as ratifying international treaties, authorizing cooperation agreements between autonomous communities, enforcing direct rule, regulating interterritorial compensation funds, and taking part in constitutional amendments and in the appointment of members to the Constitutional Court and the General Council of the Judiciary—which were not subject to override by Congress.

=== Date ===
The term of each chamber of the Cortes Generales—the Congress and the Senate—expired four years from the date of their previous election, unless they were dissolved earlier. The election decree was required to be issued no later than 25 days before the scheduled expiration date of parliament and published on the following day in the Official State Gazette (BOE), with election day taking place 54 days after the decree's publication. The previous election was held on 20 December 2015, which meant that the chambers' terms would have expired on 20 December 2019. The election decree was required to be published in the BOE no later than 26 November 2019, setting the latest possible date for election day on 19 January 2020.

The prime minister had the prerogative to propose the monarch to dissolve both chambers at any given time—either jointly or separately—and call a snap election, provided that no motion of no confidence was in process, no state of emergency was in force and that dissolution did not occur before one year after a previous one. Additionally, both chambers were to be dissolved and a new election called if an investiture process failed to elect a prime minister within a two-month period from the first ballot. Barring this exception, there was no constitutional requirement for simultaneous elections to the Congress and the Senate. Still, as of 2026, there has been no precedent of separate elections taking place under the 1978 Constitution.

Following Sánchez's nomination as investiture candidate, the president of the Congress of Deputies, Patxi López, initially scheduled the first ballot for 3 March 2016; however, this date was moved forward to 2 March so that a hypothetical repeat election was held on 26 June (a Sunday) rather than on 27 June (Monday).

The Cortes Generales were officially dissolved on 3 May 2016 with the publication of the corresponding decree in the BOE, setting election day for 26 June and scheduling for both chambers to reconvene on 19 July.

=== Electoral system ===
Voting for each chamber of the Cortes Generales was based on universal suffrage, comprising all Spanish nationals over 18 years of age with full political rights, provided that they had not been deprived of the right to vote by a final sentence, nor were legally incapacitated. Additionally, non-resident citizens were required to apply for voting, a system known as "begged" voting (Spanish: Voto rogado).

The Congress of Deputies had a minimum of 300 and a maximum of 400 seats, with electoral provisions fixing its size at 350. Of these, 348 were elected in 50 multi-member constituencies corresponding to the provinces of Spain—each of which was assigned an initial minimum of two seats and the remaining 248 distributed in proportion to population—using the D'Hondt method and closed-list proportional voting, with a three percent-threshold of valid votes (including blank ballots) in each constituency. The remaining two seats were allocated to Ceuta and Melilla as single-member districts elected by plurality voting. The use of this electoral method resulted in a higher effective threshold depending on district magnitude and vote distribution.

As a result of the aforementioned allocation, each Congress multi-member constituency was entitled the following seats:

Seats	Constituencies
36	Madrid
31	Barcelona
16	Valencia^{(+1)}
12	Alicante, Seville
11	Málaga
10	Murcia
9	Cádiz
8	A Coruña, Asturias, Balearic Islands, Biscay, Las Palmas
7	Granada, Pontevedra, Santa Cruz de Tenerife, Zaragoza
6	Almería, Badajoz, Córdoba, Gipuzkoa, Girona, Tarragona, Toledo
5	Cantabria, Castellón, Ciudad Real, Huelva, Jaén, Navarre, Valladolid
4	Álava, Albacete, Burgos, Cáceres, La Rioja, León^{(−1)}, Lleida, Lugo, Ourense, Salamanca
3	Ávila, Cuenca, Guadalajara, Huesca, Palencia, Segovia, Teruel, Zamora
2	Soria

208 Senate seats were elected using open-list (Note: Parties could group candidates into lists, although each candidate was treated separately for the purpose of the voting procedure.) partial block voting: voters in constituencies electing four seats could choose up to three candidates; in those with two or three seats, up to two; and in single-member districts, one. Each of the 47 peninsular provinces was allocated four seats, while in insular provinces—such as the Balearic and Canary Islands—the districts were the islands themselves, with the larger ones (Mallorca, Gran Canaria and Tenerife) being allocated three seats each, and the smaller ones (Menorca, Ibiza–Formentera, Fuerteventura, La Gomera, El Hierro, Lanzarote and La Palma) one each. Ceuta and Melilla elected two seats each. Additionally, autonomous communities could appoint at least one senator each and were entitled to one additional seat per million inhabitants.

The law did not provide for by-elections to fill vacant seats; instead, any vacancies arising after the proclamation of candidates and during the legislative term were filled by the next candidates on the party lists or, when required, by designated substitutes.

=== Outgoing parliament ===
The tables below show the composition of the parliamentary groups in both chambers at the time of dissolution.

Parliamentary composition in May 2016
Congress of Deputies
Groups	Parties	Deputies	
Groups	Parties	Seats	Total
People's Parliamentary Group in the Congress	PP	119	119
Socialist Parliamentary Group	PSOE	81	89
Socialist Parliamentary Group	PSC	8	89
We Can–In Common We Can–In Tide; Parliamentary Group	Podemos	50	65
We Can–In Common We Can–In Tide; Parliamentary Group	BComú	4	65
We Can–In Common We Can–In Tide; Parliamentary Group	ICV	3	65
We Can–In Common We Can–In Tide; Parliamentary Group	Equo	3	65
We Can–In Common We Can–In Tide; Parliamentary Group	EUiA	2	65
We Can–In Common We Can–In Tide; Parliamentary Group	Anova	2	65
We Can–In Common We Can–In Tide; Parliamentary Group	EU	1	65
Citizens Parliamentary Group	Cs	40	40
Republican Left's Parliamentary Group	ERC	9	9
Catalan Parliamentary Group (Democracy and Freedom)	CDC	7	8
Catalan Parliamentary Group (Democracy and Freedom)	DC	1	8
Basque Parliamentary Group (EAJ/PNV)	EAJ/PNV	6	6
Mixed Parliamentary Group	Compromís	4	14
Mixed Parliamentary Group	IU–UPeC	2	14
Mixed Parliamentary Group	UPN	2	14
Mixed Parliamentary Group	Sortu	1	14
Mixed Parliamentary Group	Alternatiba	1	14
Mixed Parliamentary Group	CCa	1	14
Mixed Parliamentary Group	FAC	1	14
Mixed Parliamentary Group	NCa	1	14
Mixed Parliamentary Group	INDEP	1 (Note: Pedro Gómez de la Serna, former PP legislator.)	14

Parliamentary composition in May 2016
Senate (Note: 1 PP appointed seat remained vacant until 14 December 2016.)
Groups	Parties	Senators	
Groups	Parties	Seats	Total
People's Parliamentary Group in the Senate	PP	140	142
People's Parliamentary Group in the Senate	PAR	2	142
Socialist Parliamentary Group	PSOE	66	67
Socialist Parliamentary Group	PSC	1	67
We Can–In Common–Commitment–In Tide; Parliamentary Group	Podemos	17	23
We Can–In Common–Commitment–In Tide; Parliamentary Group	ICV	3	23
We Can–In Common–Commitment–In Tide; Parliamentary Group	Compromís	2	23
We Can–In Common–Commitment–In Tide; Parliamentary Group	EU	1	23
Democracy and Freedom; Catalan Parliamentary Group in the Senate	CDC	7	8
Democracy and Freedom; Catalan Parliamentary Group in the Senate	DC	1	8
Republican Left's Parliamentary Group	ERC	8	8
Basque Parliamentary Group in the Senate (EAJ/PNV)	EAJ/PNV	7	7
Mixed Parliamentary Group	Cs	3	10
Mixed Parliamentary Group	UPN	1	10
Mixed Parliamentary Group	FAC	1	10
Mixed Parliamentary Group	GBai	1	10
Mixed Parliamentary Group	Sortu	1	10
Mixed Parliamentary Group	CCa	1	10
Mixed Parliamentary Group	AHI	1	10
Mixed Parliamentary Group	ASG	1	10

== Candidates ==
=== Nomination rules ===
Spanish citizens with the right to vote could run for election, provided that they had not been criminally imprisoned by a final sentence or convicted—whether final or not—of offences that involved loss of eligibility or disqualification from public office (such as rebellion, terrorism or other crimes against the state). Additional causes of ineligibility applied to the following officials:

- Members of the Spanish royal family and their spouses;
- Holders of a number of senior public or institutional posts, including the heads and members of higher courts and state institutions; (Note: These comprised the Constitutional Court, the General Council of the Judiciary, the Supreme Court, the Council of State, the Court of Auditors and the Economic and Social Council.) the Ombudsman; the State's Attorney General; high-ranking officials of government departments, the Office of the Prime Minister and other state agencies; government delegates in the autonomous communities; the chair of RTVE; the director of the Electoral Register Office; the governor and deputy governor of the Bank of Spain; the heads of official credit institutions; and members of electoral commissions and of the Nuclear Safety Council;
- Heads of diplomatic missions abroad;
- Judges and public prosecutors in active service;
- Members of the Armed Forces and law enforcement bodies in active service.

Other ineligibility provisions also applied to a number of territorial officials in these categories within their areas of jurisdiction, as well as to employees of foreign states and members of regional governments.

Incompatibility rules included those of ineligibility, and also barred running in multiple constituencies or lists, holding office if the candidacy was later declared illegal (by a final ruling), and combining legislative roles (deputy, senator, and regional lawmaker) with each other or with:

- A number of senior public or institutional posts, including the presidency of the National Commission on Markets and Competition; and leadership positions in RTVE, government offices, public authorities (such as port authorities, hydrographic confederations, or highway concessionary companies), public entities and state-owned or publicly funded companies;
- Any other paid public or private position, except university teaching.

=== Parties and lists ===
The electoral law allowed for parties and federations registered in the interior ministry, alliances and groupings of electors to present lists of candidates. Parties and federations intending to form an alliance were required to inform the relevant electoral commission within 10 days of the election call, whereas groupings of electors needed to secure the signature of at least one percent of the electorate in the constituencies for which they sought election, disallowing electors from signing for more than one list. Concurrently, parties, federations or alliances that had not obtained a mandate in either chamber of the Cortes at the preceding election were required to secure the signature of at least 0.1 percent of electors in the aforementioned constituencies. Additionally, a balanced composition of men and women was required in the electoral lists, so that candidates of either sex made up at least 40 percent of the total composition.

Below is a list of the main parties and alliances which contested the election:

Candidacy	Parties and alliances	Leading candidate	Ideology	Previous result				Gov.	Ref.
Candidacy	Parties and alliances	Leading candidate	Ideology	Congress		Senate		Gov.	Ref.
Candidacy	Parties and alliances	Leading candidate	Ideology	Vote %	Seats	Vote %	Seats	Gov.	Ref.
PP	List: People's Party (PP); Navarrese People's Union (UPN); Forum of Citizens (FAC); Aragonese Party (PAR)	Mariano Rajoy	Conservatism; Christian democracy	28.7%	123	30.3%	124	Yes	
PSOE	List: Spanish Socialist Workers' Party (PSOE); Socialists' Party of Catalonia (PSC); New Canaries (NCa)	Pedro Sánchez	Social democracy	22.0%	90	22.4%	47	No	
Unidos; Podemos	List: We Can (Podemos); United Left (IU) – Communist Party of Spain (PCE) – The Dawn Marxist Organization (La Aurora (OM)) – Republican Left (IR) – Open Left (IzAb) – Feminist Party of Spain (PFE); Equo (Equo); More for Mallorca (Més); Assembly (Batzarre); Popular Unity in Common (UPeC); Asturian Left (IAS); Building the Left–Socialist Alternative (CLI–AS); Segoviemos (SGV); Castilian Left (IzCa); Participative Democracy (Participa); In Common We Can−Let's Win Change (ECP) – Barcelona in Common (BComú) – We Can (Podem) – Initiative for Catalonia Greens (ICV) – United and Alternative Left (EUiA); The Valencian Way (Compromís–Podemos–EUPV) – Commitment Coalition (Compromís) – We Can (Podemos/Podem) – United Left of the Valencian Country (EUPV); In Tide (Podemos–Anova–EU) – Renewal–Nationalist Brotherhood (Anova)	Pablo Iglesias	Left-wing populism Direct democracy Democratic socialism	24.5%	71	22.1% (Note: Results for Podemos–ECP–És el moment–En Marea (18.5%, 16 senators), IU–UPeC (3.6%, 0 senators) and Més (0.1%, 0 senators) in the 2015 Senate election.)	16	No	
C's	List: Citizens–Party of the Citizenry (C's)	Albert Rivera	Liberalism	13.9%	40	11.2%	0	No	
ERC–CatSí	List: Republican Left of Catalonia (ERC); Catalonia Yes (CatSí)	Gabriel Rufián	Catalan independence Left-wing nationalism Social democracy	2.4%	9	2.9%	6	No	
CDC	List: Democratic Convergence of Catalonia (CDC)	Francesc Homs	Catalan independence Liberalism	2.2%	7	2.3%	5	No	
EAJ/PNV	List: Basque Nationalist Party (EAJ/PNV)	Aitor Esteban	Basque nationalism Christian democracy	1.2%	6	1.4%	6	No	
EH Bildu	List: Create (Sortu); Basque Solidarity (EA); Aralar (Aralar); Alternative (Alternatiba)	Marian Beitialarrangoitia (Note: EH Bildu did not field a single visible leader; instead, prominence was given to the lead candidate in each of the constituencies where it ran. Marian Beitialarrangoitia from Gipuzkoa was later selected as EH Bildu's spokesperson in Congress.)	Basque independence Abertzale left Socialism	0.9%	2	0.9%	0	No	
CCa–PNC	List: Canarian Coalition (CCa); Canarian Nationalist Party (PNC); Independent Herrenian Group (AHI)	Ana Oramas	Regionalism; Canarian nationalism Centrism	0.3%	1	0.2%	1	No	
GBai	List: Expanding (Zabaltzen); Villava Group (AT); Basque Nationalist Party (EAJ/PNV)	Daniel Innerarity	Basque nationalism Social democracy	0.1%	0	(Note: Geroa Bai (1 senator) contested the 2015 Senate election within the Cambio/Aldaketa alliance.)	1	No	
ASG	List: Gomera Socialist Group (ASG)	Yaiza Castilla	Insularism; Social democracy	Did not contest		0.0%	1	No	

The People's Party renewed the alliances with Navarrese People's Union in Navarre, Aragonese Party in Aragon, and Forum of Citizens in Asturias. The Spanish Socialist Workers' Party and New Canaries maintained their alliance in the Canary Islands. Geroa Bai and EH Bildu explored alliance possibilities with Podemos and Izquierda-Ezkerra in Navarre, then on a joint list after the first option was rejected, without success.

PP alliances for the Congress of Deputies

PSOE for the Congress of Deputies

Already from 20 April, both Podemos and United Left–Popular Unity started exploring a joint list for a likely fresh election. Once the repeat election was confirmed, both parties acknowledged that talks had formally started and that an agreement was expected to be reached throughout the next week. On 9 May, Pablo Iglesias (Podemos) and Alberto Garzón (IU) officially announced the new alliance. Equo, which had already supported the continuation of its alliance with Podemos, announced it would also participate in the newly formed platform. The Podemos–IU national agreement paved the way for IU to join the És el moment alliance in the Valencian Community, which was transformed into the A la valenciana platform. On 13 May, it was announced that the alliance name for the election would be Unidos Podemos (Spanish for "United We Can").

The newly formed Podemos–IU alliance offered a nationwide alliance with PSOE to contest the Senate election, in an effort to prevent a new PP absolute majority in that chamber. Pedro Sánchez rejected such possibility despite ongoing negotiations in Aragon, the Balearic Islands and the Valencian Community. However, the party's Valencian branch, which advocated for an alliance with Compromís and Podemos for the Senate under the "Valencian Accord" label (In Valencian: Acord Valencià), initially refused to acknowledge Sánchez's command, but was forced to cave in after several days of conflict.

Unidos Podemos alliance system

Podemos aimed at enlarging its alliance system from December, seeking to conglomerate all forces to the left of PSOE in a single, unitary alliance for the 2016 election. Both En Comú Podem and En Marea had already announced their intention to continue their successful alliances. Talks between Podemos and Més had also started in the Balearic Islands ahead of a prospective election alliance, aiming at forming a "grand coalition of the left" in the islands. Podemos tried to probe Animalist Party Against Mistreatment of Animals into a common nationwide list for the 2016 election, but this was rejected by the latter as it perceived that Podemos was "not clear enough on the issue of banning bullfighting".

Democratic Convergence of Catalonia (CDC)—which contested the 2015 election under the Democracy and Freedom (DiL) banner—made an offer to Republican Left of Catalonia (ERC) to re-establish the Junts pel Sí unitary coalition under which they both contested the 2015 Catalan regional election. Former Catalan president Artur Mas offered himself to lead such an alliance into the election if it was eventually formed. ERC rejected the offer and chose to run on its own instead. Subsequently, debate arose within CDC on the opportunity to continue the DiL alliance or to opt for alternative formulas to contest the election. Democrats of Catalonia and Reagrupament, CDC's allies within DiL, suggested rebranding the alliance as "Together for Catalonia" and demanded it to be led by an independent. CDC leaders rejected this proposal and announced on 9 May that they were contesting the election on their own.

== Campaign ==
=== Timetable ===
The key dates are listed below (all times are CET. The Canary Islands used WET (UTC+0) instead):

- 3 May: The election decree is issued with the countersign of the president of the Congress of Deputies, ratified by the King; formal dissolution of parliament and start of prohibition period on the inauguration of public works, services or projects.
- 6 May: Initial constitution of provincial and zone electoral commissions with judicial members.
- 9 May: Division of constituencies into polling sections and stations.
- 13 May: Deadline for parties and federations to report on their electoral alliances.
- 16 May: Deadline for electoral register consultation for the purpose of possible corrections.
- 23 May: Deadline for parties, federations, alliances, and groupings of electors to present electoral lists.
- 25 May: Publication of submitted electoral lists in the Official State Gazette (BOE).
- 28 May: Deadline for non-resident citizens (electors residing abroad (CERA) and citizens temporarily absent from Spain) to apply for voting.
- 30 May: Official proclamation of validly submitted electoral lists.
- 31 May: Publication of proclaimed electoral lists in the BOE.
- 1 June: Deadline for the selection of polling station members by sortition.
- 9 June: Deadline for the appointment of non-judicial members to provincial and zone electoral commissions.
- 10 June: Official start of electoral campaigning.
- 16 June: Deadline to apply for postal voting.
- 21 June: Start of legal ban on electoral opinion polling publication; deadline for CERA citizens to vote by mail.
- 22 June: Deadline for postal and temporarily absent voting.
- 24 June: Last day of electoral campaigning; deadline for CERA voting.
- 25 June: Official election silence ("reflection day").
- 26 June: Election day (polling stations open at 9 am and close at 8 pm or once voters present in a queue at/outside the polling station at 8 pm have cast their vote); provisional vote counting.
- 29 June: Start of general vote counting, including CERA votes.
- 2 July: Deadline for the general vote counting.
- 11 July: Deadline for the proclamation of elected members.
- 21 July: Deadline for the reconvening of parliament (date determined by the election decree, which for the 2016 election was set for 19 July).
- 20 August: Deadline for the publication of definitive election results in the BOE.

=== Party slogans ===
Party or alliance	Original slogan	English translation	Ref.
PP	« A favor »	"In favour"	
PSOE	« Un SÍ por el cambio »	"A YES for change"	
Unidos Podemos: ECP; A la valenciana; En Marea	Main: « La sonrisa de un país » ECP: « Guanyem el canvi » A la valenciana: « La victòria de la gent » En Marea: « O cambio non hai quen o pare »	Main: "The smile of a country" ECP: "Let's win the change" A la valenciana: "Victory of the people" En Marea: "The change does not stop"	
C's	« Tiempo de acuerdo, tiempo de cambio »	"Time of agreement, time of change"	
ERC–CatSí	« L'únic canvi posible »	"The only possible change"	
CDC	« Fets x Catalunya » & « Molt per defensar »	"Facts for Catalonia" & "Much to defend"	
EAJ/PNV	« Lehenik Euskadi. Euskadi es lo que importa »	"The Basque Country first. The Basque Country is what matters"	
EH Bildu	« Aukerak zabaltzera goaz » « Vamos a crear oportunidades »	"Let's create opportunities"	
CCa–PNC	« [Ana Oramas] sí nos representa »	"[Ana Oramas] represents us"	

=== Events and issues ===
As parties geared up for the upcoming election campaign, the PP faced the fresh election looking back at the corruption scandals under judicial investigation in which the party was involved. Some of such scandals, involving senior party members such as Rita Barberá, stirred up debate as to whether it was best to maintain these people within party ranks or force their withdrawal. C's, on its part, discarded its pact with the PSOE after it was announced that a new election would be held, with party leaders stating that it "won't be in force anymore" once the Cortes were dissolved. However, they wanted to use the accord as a showing of the party's "willingness to negotiate" with forces both to the left and right of the spectrum. The party's main aim was to prevent that a possible campaign polarization could cast "fearful" voters away to the PP to prevent Podemos' rise. Albert Rivera said that the PP was "controlled by its 'old guard'" and that his party would not negotiate with the PP so long as Rajoy remained as leader.

The PSOE suffered from the end of the negotiations period. Carme Chacón—former Defence Minister under José Luis Rodríguez Zapatero—and Irene Lozano—an independent, formerly aligned to UPyD, personally enlisted into PSOE by Pedro Sánchez for the December election—both announced their withdrawal from PSOE lists ahead of the June election. Concurrently, PSOE leaders had tried to pressure United Left into avoiding an electoral alliance with Podemos out of fear of being pushed into third place nationally, with some commenting that the party's actions had been erratic and confusing throughout negotiations. Coupled with growing pessimism within PSOE ranks, this was said to potentially be able to harm them going into the campaign. On 30 April, Sánchez tried to stir up morale among party members and asked for "unity and trust" around him ahead of the new election. Susana Díaz, Sánchez's rival for the party's leadership, warned him that she would only accept "a PSOE win". Once the hegemonic party of the Spanish left, the PSOE had been pushed out of the left and into the centre, with some fearing it could run down the path of the Greek PASOK.

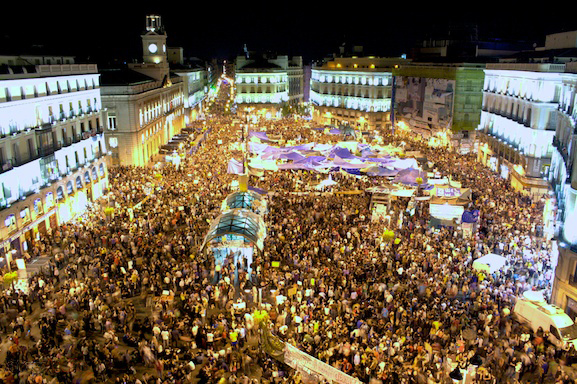
The fifth anniversary of the 15-M Movement coincided with the election's pre-campaign period.

As the newly formed Unidos Podemos alliance was announced on early May, the PSOE found itself under threat of being marginalized as both PP and UP sought to polarize the campaign between the two. Sánchez tried to remain in the spotlight and cast off the phantom of party internal division by releasing a series of key announcements throughout the first weeks of May. Margarita Robles—a judge from the Spanish Supreme Court and former state secretary for Interior under Felipe González—and Josep Borrell—former minister of Public Works—were announced to be signing up for Sánchez's campaign; concurrently, Susana Díaz accepted to officially present Sánchez's proclamation as PSOE candidate, in a move seen as an act of apparent "reconciliation" between the two leaders ahead of the election. Sánchez was also expected to announce his "shadow cabinet" on 15 May, and tried to appeal to centrist voters that a vote for him would be a "vote for change".

Pablo Iglesias blamed the PSOE for the failure in negotiations and commented that Podemos' aim in the June election would be to directly face the PP as equals, in what he referred to as a "second round" of the December run. Iglesias offered to explore the possibility of an accord with PSOE after the election, expressing his will to form a "progressive" government, but condemned the way the PSOE had—in his view—treated his party up until that point. During an interview held a few days later, Iglesias took for granted that his party had already surpassed the PSOE nationally and stated he would offer Sánchez be his deputy in a Podemos-led cabinet. Once his electoral coalition with IU had been formalized, Iglesias again reiterated his wish to see the PSOE "as an ally"—despite the Socialists having rejected Podemos' offer for an alliance to the Senate—and put overtaking the PP as his target.

For the first time since 2011, the anniversary of the 15-M Movement came marked by the pre-electoral campaign of a general election. UP, self-declared as the Movement's political heir, intended to use the event as a launching point for its campaign. Various nods to 15-M were made: the announcement of the Podemos–IU alliance was staged on 9 May at Puerta del Sol, long-regarded as a symbol and focal point for 15-M. Concurrently, Podemos launched an "accountability" campaign under the 'Congress in your square' label "to regain the connection with the streets". On 15 May, thousands gathered at Puerta del Sol to commemorate the 15-M anniversary; the crowd shouting some of the Movement's most featured slogans, such as the "Yes we can!" warcry—which had also served as Podemos' party slogan ever since its inception.

As UP struggled to gain momentum, PP, PSOE and C's turned their attacks on the newborn alliance, trying to corner it to the far-left side of the spectrum. Andalusian president Susana Díaz said of it that it was "the reunion of the Communist Youth"; the PP described it as "the old-fashioned communists but with another name". C's leader Albert Rivera commented that his party offered itself "without sickles, hammers nor corruption", in reference both to UP and the PP.

Following the result of the Brexit vote three days before the election in Spain, the PP issued a statement saying the country needed "stability" in the face of "radicalism" and "populism." It was also read as an attack on the Unidos Podemos coalition that vowed to fight for the least well-off. Iglesias said that Europe had to "change course. No-one would want to leave Europe if it were fair and united."

=== Debates ===
After the success of election debates in the 2015 election, the organizing of new debates for the incoming campaign started after the Cortes's dissolution. As in the previous election, the first debate was organized by the Demos Association, to be held in the Charles III University of Madrid on 6 June. The leaders of the four main parties were invited, with Pablo Iglesias and Albert Rivera confirming their presence but making it conditional on Rajoy and Sánchez attending as well. Atresmedia also announced the group's intention to have a four-way debate, scheduled for 16 June, similar to the one held on 7 December. This time, Mariano Rajoy was willing to attend a four-way leaders' debate—unlike the previous election campaign, in which his party sent Soraya Sáenz de Santamaría instead. The PP was, however, unconvinced of holding another two-way debate with Pedro Sánchez, with Rajoy displeased with the format of 14 December debate—allegedly after a harsh confrontation with Sánchez following the latter referring to Rajoy as "indecent".

The PSOE announced that Sánchez would not attend a debate with Iglesias and Rivera if Rajoy was not present as well. C's made Rivera's presence conditional on either Rajoy attending or having an empty lectern put in his place, but would not accept the PP sending another person instead. Podemos did not take a firm stance on the issue but Íñigo Errejón stated that his party would "go to all debates, always sending spokespeople at the same level as those sent by other political forces", thus opening the door for Iglesias not attending debates if other parties did not send their prime ministerial candidates.

As neither Rajoy nor Sánchez confirmed their presence at the Charles III debate, the Demos Association announced its cancellation on 30 May. A four-way debate was announced to be held on 13 June to be organized by the Academy of Television. All four main parties confirmed their presence, with the novelty that Rajoy accepted an invitation to attend as well. Unlike the previous campaign, the PP rejected a two-way debate between Rajoy and Sánchez, on grounds that, according to opinion polls, if a two-way debate was held "it was doubtful which party was to face Rajoy"—in reference to Unidos Podemos having overtaken the PSOE in opinion polling ahead of the election.

Pablo Iglesias and Albert Rivera staged a two-on-two debate in the Salvados news show hosted by Jordi Évole. The debate was not broadcast live, but rather recorded on 28 May and intentionally delayed until 5 June. Évole had stated that the debate had been "specially harsh" between both candidates in comparison to previous similar events, and that C's had put a series of conditions in order to accept bringing Rivera to the debate.

2016 Spanish general election debates
Date	Organizer(s)	Moderator(s)	P Present (Note: Denotes a main invitee attending the event.) S Surrogate (Note: Denotes a main invitee not attending the event, sending a surrogate in their place.) NI Not invited I Invited A Absent invitee								
Date	Organizer(s)	Moderator(s)	PP	PSOE	UP	C's	ERC	CDC	PNV	Audience	Ref.
5 June	laSexta (Salvados)	Jordi Évole	A	A	P Iglesias	P Rivera	NI	NI	NI	18.2% (3,237,000)	
9 June	Atresmedia (Note: "Women's debate".)	Vicente Vallés	P Levy	P Robles	P Bescansa	P Arrimadas	NI	NI	NI	12.7% (2,040,000)	
12 June	laSexta (El Objetivo) (Note: Economic debate.)	Ana Pastor	P De Guindos	P Sevilla	P Garzón	P Garicano	NI	NI	NI	11.2% (1,992,000)	
13 June	ATV	Ana Blanco; Pedro Piqueras; Vicente Vallés	P Rajoy	P Sánchez	P Iglesias	P Rivera	NI	NI	NI	57.0% (10,496,000)	
20 June	La 1 (El debate de La 1)	Julio Somoano	S Casado	S Rodríguez	S Errejón	S Girauta	P Rufián	S Campuzano	P Esteban	4.8% (845,000)	

Opinion polls

Candidate viewed as "performing best" or "most convincing" in each debate
Debate	Polling firm/Commissioner	PP	PSOE	UP	C's	Tie	None	Question
13 June	Invymark/laSexta	21.8	18.0	28.9	17.7	–	–	13.6
13 June	Metroscopia/El País	18.0	6.0	22.0	14.0	–	–	40.0
13 June	NC Report/La Razón	25.5	18.7	21.5	15.0	–	–	19.3
13 June	DYM/El Confidencial	15.2	9.9	17.6	15.8	–	19.6	21.9
13 June	Sigma Dos/El Mundo	23.3	9.5	13.3	16.7	–	30.1	7.1
13 June	CIS	21.1	10.3	14.3	9.9	3.4	32.8	8.1

=== Cost ===
One of the main themes going into the June election was the economic cost that a new campaign would mean for the budget. During the final round of talks, King Felipe VI—anticipating a fresh election—had asked parties to run austere campaigns.

The PP proposed that the party avoid large scale rallies, aiming at running a "simpler" campaign—with smaller events in medium-sized cities and towns—while also suggesting reducing the campaign's length to 10 days and removing external advertising—namely that involving advertising through billboards and flags. The PSOE suggested reducing campaign spending by 30%, cutting mailing spending and removing external advertising. Podemos and C's proposed unifying party mailing, with C's being favourable to cutting party spending by 50%. Podemos went further and suggested limiting parties' spending to 3 million each.

All three PSOE, Podemos and C's were against PP's proposal of making a shorter campaign or for cuts to affect election debates. As some of these proposals required changes in the electoral law—something which could not happen as the Cortes would be dissolved—parties called for reaching a gentlemen's agreement; in Albert Rivera's words, "a political pact through which changing the law wouldn't be necessary". However, negotiations held to discuss the reduction of electoral spending failed to produce an agreement, with parties expected to cut their spending at will.

== Opinion polls ==
Local regression trend line of poll results from 20 December 2015 to 26 June 2016, with each line corresponding to a political party.

== Voter turnout ==
The table below shows registered voter turnout during the election. Figures for election day do not include non-resident citizens, while final figures do.

Region	Time (Election day)									Final		
Region	14:00			18:00			20:00			Final		
Region	2015	2016	+/–	2015	2016	+/–	2015	2016	+/–	2015	2016	+/–
Andalusia	34.98%	37.60%	+2.62	55.83%	50.25%	−5.58	71.31%	68.16%	−3.15	69.08%	66.05%	−3.03
Aragon	39.38%	37.88%	−1.50	59.53%	50.86%	−8.67	74.71%	71.89%	−2.82	72.58%	69.92%	−2.66
Asturias	35.35%	34.70%	−0.65	56.96%	50.84%	−6.12	71.22%	68.19%	−3.03	63.77%	61.09%	−2.68
Balearic Islands	35.02%	34.48%	−0.54	52.18%	47.05%	−5.13	65.20%	62.58%	−2.62	63.35%	60.73%	−2.62
Basque Country	39.39%	36.05%	−3.34	58.97%	51.36%	−7.61	71.44%	67.44%	−4.00	69.00%	65.17%	−3.83
Canary Islands	27.38%	28.38%	+1.00	47.42%	44.86%	−2.56	65.65%	64.37%	−1.28	60.33%	59.11%	−1.22
Cantabria	40.34%	39.22%	−1.12	62.31%	56.19%	−6.12	76.00%	73.37%	−2.63	70.97%	68.52%	−2.45
Castile and León	37.18%	37.18%	±0.00	59.48%	53.33%	−6.15	75.95%	73.34%	−2.61	71.22%	68.79%	−2.43
Castilla–La Mancha	37.54%	38.92%	+1.38	59.70%	52.44%	−7.26	76.49%	72.94%	−3.55	75.26%	71.78%	−3.48
Catalonia	35.24%	32.31%	−2.93	56.62%	46.38%	−10.24	70.98%	65.60%	−5.38	68.63%	63.42%	−5.21
Extremadura	35.91%	39.48%	+3.57	56.39%	51.40%	−4.99	74.11%	70.45%	−3.66	72.17%	68.63%	−3.54
Galicia	33.42%	34.07%	+0.65	58.51%	51.68%	−6.83	73.00%	69.63%	−3.37	61.53%	58.76%	−2.77
La Rioja	40.70%	40.94%	+0.24	60.63%	55.61%	−5.02	76.66%	74.71%	−1.95	72.43%	70.62%	−1.81
Madrid	40.35%	39.01%	−1.34	63.37%	54.48%	−8.89	77.76%	74.26%	−3.50	74.12%	70.81%	−3.31
Murcia	38.51%	39.96%	+1.45	59.29%	52.89%	−6.40	72.96%	71.35%	−1.61	71.14%	69.58%	−1.56
Navarre	39.53%	38.03%	−1.50	59.00%	51.77%	−7.23	74.28%	70.58%	−3.70	70.93%	67.40%	−3.53
Valencian Community	43.25%	43.34%	+0.09	63.51%	56.51%	−7.00	76.58%	74.09%	−2.49	74.79%	72.37%	−2.42
Ceuta	25.36%	24.97%	−0.39	42.33%	37.51%	−4.82	56.44%	52.59%	−3.85	54.36%	50.65%	−3.19
Melilla	23.04%	21.82%	−1.22	38.81%	34.32%	−4.49	53.29%	51.35%	−1.94	49.35%	47.55%	−1.80
Total	37.01%	36.87%	−0.14	58.37%	51.21%	−7.16	73.20%	69.83%	−3.37	69.67%	66.48%	−3.19

== Results ==
=== Congress of Deputies ===
← Summary of 26 June 2016 Congress of Deputies election results →
Parties and alliances	Popular vote			Seats	
Parties and alliances	Votes	%	±pp	Total	+/−
People's Party (PP)	7,941,236	33.01	+4.30	137	+14
Spanish Socialist Workers' Party (PSOE)	5,443,846	22.63	+0.63	85	−5
United We Can (Unidos Podemos)	5,087,538	21.15	−3.34	71	±0
United We Can (Podemos–IU–Equo)^{1}	3,227,123	13.42	−2.63	45	+1
In Common We Can–Let's Win the Change (ECP)	853,102	3.55	−0.14	12	±0
The Valencian Way (Podemos–Compromís–EUPV)^{2}	659,771	2.74	−0.38	9	±0
In Tide (Podemos–Anova–EU)	347,542	1.44	−0.19	5	−1
Citizens–Party of the Citizenry (C's)	3,141,570	13.06	−0.88	32	−8
Republican Left–Catalonia Yes (ERC–CatSí)	639,652	2.66	+0.26	9	±0
Republican Left–Catalonia Yes (ERC–CatSí)	632,234	2.63	+0.24	9	±0
Sovereignty for the Isles (SI)	7,418	0.03	New	0	±0
Democratic Convergence of Catalonia (CDC)^{3}	483,488	2.01	−0.24	8	±0
Basque Nationalist Party (EAJ/PNV)	287,014	1.19	−0.01	5	−1
Animalist Party Against Mistreatment of Animals (PACMA)	286,702	1.19	+0.32	0	±0
Basque Country Gather (EH Bildu)	184,713	0.77	−0.10	2	±0
Canarian Coalition–Canarian Nationalist Party (CCa–PNC)	78,253	0.33	+0.01	1	±0
Zero Cuts–Green Group (Recortes Cero–GV)	51,907	0.22	+0.03	0	±0
Union, Progress and Democracy (UPyD)	50,247	0.21	−0.41	0	±0
Vox (Vox)	47,182	0.20	−0.03	0	±0
Galician Nationalist Bloc–We–Galician Candidacy (BNG–Nós)^{4}	45,252	0.19	−0.09	0	±0
Communist Party of the Peoples of Spain (PCPE)	26,627	0.11	−0.01	0	±0
Yes to the Future (GBai)	14,343	0.06	−0.06	0	±0
Blank Seats (EB)	11,669	0.05	+0.01	0	±0
Spanish Phalanx of the CNSO (FE de las JONS)	9,909	0.04	+0.01	0	±0
Citizens of Democratic Centre (CCD)	8,945	0.04	±0.00	0	±0
Citizens of Democratic Centre (CCD)	6,273	0.03	−0.01	0	±0
Citizens of Democratic Centre–Independent Candidacy (CCD–CI)	2,672	0.01	New	0	±0
We Are Valencian (SOMVAL)	6,647	0.03	+0.01	0	±0
Internationalist Solidarity and Self-Management (SAIn)	3,110	0.01	−0.01	0	±0
Humanist Party (PH)	3,012	0.01	±0.00	0	±0
The Eco-pacifist Greens (Centro Moderado)	3,011	0.01	±0.00	0	±0
Libertarian Party (P–LIB)	2,996	0.01	±0.00	0	±0
Leonese People's Union (UPL)	2,295	0.01	New	0	±0
Spanish Communist Workers' Party (PCOE)	1,822	0.01	±0.00	0	±0
We Are Andalusians Party, For Andalusia and the Peoples (AND)	1,727	0.01	New	0	±0
Together for Canaries (JxC)	1,190	0.00	New	0	±0
Family and Life Party (PFyV)	846	0.00	±0.00	0	±0
United Free Citizens (CILUS)	830	0.00	±0.00	0	±0
Platform for Catalonia (PxC)	724	0.00	New	0	±0
Social Aragonese Movement (MAS)	723	0.00	New	0	±0
Navarrese Freedom (Ln)	702	0.00	±0.00	0	±0
Navarrese Freedom (Ln)	622	0.00	±0.00	0	±0
Rioja Southern Territory–Navarrese Freedom (HRTS–Ln)	80	0.00	New	0	±0
Revolutionary Anticapitalist Left (IZAR)	687	0.00	New	0	±0
Unity of the People (UP)^{5}	686	0.00	−0.01	0	±0
Regionalist Party of the Leonese Country (PREPAL)	668	0.00	−0.01	0	±0
Political Renovation (RePo)	570	0.00	New	0	±0
Independents for Aragon (i)	550	0.00	±0.00	0	±0
Forward (Entabán)	377	0.00	New	0	±0
Merindades of Castile Initiative (IMC)	356	0.00	New	0	±0
State of Spain Unionist Party (PUEDE)	336	0.00	New	0	±0
The Phalanx (FE)	254	0.00	New	0	±0
Alliance of the Democratic Centre (ALCD)	214	0.00	New	0	±0
Spain Elders' Force (FME)	200	0.00	New	0	±0
Union of Everyone (UdT)	48	0.00	New	0	±0
Blank ballots	179,081	0.74	−0.01		
Total	24,053,755			350	±0
Valid votes	24,053,755	99.07	−0.04		
Invalid votes	225,504	0.93	+0.04		
Votes cast / turnout	24,279,259	66.48	−3.19		
Abstentions	12,241,654	33.52	+3.19		
Registered voters	36,520,913				
Sources
Footnotes: ^{1} United We Can results are compared to the combined totals of We Can, United Left–Popular Unity in Common and More for the Balearic Islands in the 2015 election. It does not include results in Catalonia, Galicia and Valencian Community.; ^{2} The Valencian Way results are compared to the combined totals of It is Time and United Left of the Valencian Country in the 2015 election.; ^{3} Democratic Convergence of Catalonia results are compared to Democracy and Freedom totals in the 2015 election.; ^{4} Galician Nationalist Bloc–We–Galician Candidacy results are compared to We–Galician Candidacy totals in the 2015 election.; ^{5} Unity of the People results are compared to Canaries Decides totals in the 2015 election.

Popular vote
PP	33.01%
PSOE	22.63%
Unidos Podemos	21.15%
C's	13.06%
ERC–CatSí	2.66%
CDC	2.01%
EAJ/PNV	1.19%
PACMA	1.19%
EH Bildu	0.77%
CCa–PNC	0.33%
Others	1.26%
Blank ballots	0.74%

Seats
PP	39.14%
PSOE	24.29%
Unidos Podemos	20.29%
C's	9.14%
ERC–CatSí	2.57%
CDC	2.29%
EAJ/PNV	1.43%
EH Bildu	0.57%
CCa–PNC	0.29%

=== Senate ===
← Summary of the 26 June 2016 Senate of Spain election results →
Parties and alliances	Popular vote			Seats	
Parties and alliances	Votes	%	±pp	Total	+/−
People's Party (PP)	22,285,969	34.22	+3.91	130	+6
Spanish Socialist Workers' Party (PSOE)	15,354,929	23.58	+1.14	43	−4
United We Can (Unidos Podemos)	12,786,779	19.63	−2.50	16	±0
United We Can (Podemos–IU–Equo)^{1}	8,033,194	12.33	−2.24	8	−1
In Common We Can–Let's Win the Change (ECP)	1,983,121	3.05	±0.00	4	±0
The Valencian Way (Podemos–Compromís–EUPV)^{2}	1,882,388	2.89	−0.12	3	+2
In Tide (Podemos–Anova–EU)	888,076	1.36	−0.14	1	−1
Citizens–Party of the Citizenry (C's)	6,894,853	10.59	−0.59	0	±0
Republican Left–Catalonia Yes (ERC–CatSí)	1,943,829	2.98	+0.12	10	+4
Republican Left–Catalonia Yes (ERC–CatSí)	1,928,472	2.96	+0.11	10	+4
Sovereignty for the Isles (SI)	15,357	0.02	New	0	±0
Democratic Convergence of Catalonia (CDC)^{3}	1,421,653	2.18	−0.13	2	−4
Animalist Party Against Mistreatment of Animals (PACMA)	1,213,871	1.86	+0.30	0	±0
Basque Nationalist Party (EAJ/PNV)	885,860	1.36	−0.01	5	−1
Basque Country Gather (EH Bildu)	587,650	0.90	+0.05	0	±0
Union, Progress and Democracy (UPyD)	186,127	0.29	−0.65	0	±0
Galician Nationalist Bloc–We–Galician Candidacy (BNG–Nós)^{4}	184,812	0.28	−0.14	0	±0
Zero Cuts–Green Group (Recortes Cero–GV)	180,500	0.28	+0.02	0	±0
Vox (Vox)	165,740	0.25	−0.05	0	±0
Canarian Coalition–Canarian Nationalist Party (CCa–PNC)	148,970	0.23	−0.01	1	±0
Communist Party of the Peoples of Spain (PCPE)	71,540	0.11	−0.05	0	±0
Blank Seats (EB)	66,445	0.10	−0.03	0	±0
Spanish Phalanx of the CNSO (FE de las JONS)	35,187	0.05	−0.01	0	±0
Yes to the Future (GBai)^{5}	32,082	0.05	n/a	0	−1
We Are Valencian (SOMVAL)	23,629	0.04	+0.01	0	±0
Citizens of Democratic Centre (CCD)	15,355	0.02	−0.01	0	±0
Citizens of Democratic Centre (CCD)	11,459	0.02	−0.01	0	±0
Citizens of Democratic Centre–Independent Candidacy (CCD–CI)	3,896	0.01	New	0	±0
Internationalist Solidarity and Self-Management (SAIn)	12,670	0.02	−0.01	0	±0
The Eco-pacifist Greens (Centro Moderado)	8,401	0.01	±0.00	0	±0
Humanist Party (PH)	8,088	0.01	±0.00	0	±0
Leonese People's Union (UPL)	6,949	0.01	New	0	±0
Libertarian Party (P–LIB)	6,042	0.01	New	0	±0
Regionalist Party of the Leonese Country (PREPAL)	5,668	0.01	New	0	±0
Gomera Socialist Group (ASG)	4,340	0.01	New	1	±0
Forward Badajoz (BA)	3,012	0.00	−0.01	0	±0
Independents for Aragon (i)	2,506	0.00	±0.00	0	±0
Navarrese Freedom (Ln)	2,503	0.00	−0.01	0	±0
Navarrese Freedom (Ln)	2,250	0.00	−0.01	0	±0
Rioja Southern Territory–Navarrese Freedom (HRTS–Ln)	253	0.00	New	0	±0
Together for Canaries (JxC)	2,239	0.00	New	0	±0
Merindades of Castile Initiative (IMC)	1,948	0.00	±0.00	0	±0
Social Aragonese Movement (MAS)	1,868	0.00	New	0	±0
United Free Citizens (CILUS)	1,633	0.00	±0.00	0	±0
Family and Life Party (PFyV)	1,597	0.00	±0.00	0	±0
Platform for Catalonia (PxC)	991	0.00	New	0	±0
Unity of the People (UP)^{6}	971	0.00	−0.01	0	±0
Political Renovation (RePo)	938	0.00	New	0	±0
Forward (Entabán)	765	0.00	New	0	±0
The Phalanx (FE)	391	0.00	New	0	±0
Alliance of the Democratic Centre (ALCD)	300	0.00	New	0	±0
Union of Everyone (UdT)	73	0.00	New	0	±0
Blank ballots (Note: The percentage of blank ballots is calculated over the official number of valid votes cast, irrespective of the total number of votes shown as a result of adding up the individual results for each party.)	565,563	2.42	−1.64		
Total	65,125,236			208	±0
Valid votes	23,393,161	97.47	+0.69		
Invalid votes	606,435	2.53	−0.69		
Votes cast / turnout	23,999,596	65.71	−2.55		
Abstentions	12,521,317	34.29	+2.55		
Registered voters	36,520,913				
Sources
Footnotes: ^{1} United We Can results are compared to the combined totals of We Can and United Left–Popular Unity in Common and More for Mallorca in the 2015 election. It does not include results in Catalonia, Galicia and Valencian Community.; ^{2} The Valencian Way results are compared to the combined totals of It is Time and United Left of the Valencian Country in the 2015 election.; ^{3} Democratic Convergence of Catalonia results are compared to Democracy and Freedom totals in the 2015 election.; ^{4} Galician Nationalist Bloc–We–Galician Candidacy results are compared to We–Galician Candidacy totals in the 2015 election.; ^{5} Within the Change alliance in the 2015 election.; ^{6} Unity of the People results are compared to Canaries Decides totals in the 2015 election.

Popular vote
PP	34.22%
PSOE	23.58%
Unidos Podemos	19.63%
C's	10.59%
ERC–CatSí	2.98%
CDC	2.18%
PACMA	1.86%
EAJ/PNV	1.36%
CCa–PNC	0.23%
ASG	0.01%
Others	2.99%
Blank ballots	2.42%

Seats
PP	62.50%
PSOE	20.67%
Unidos Podemos	7.69%
ERC–CatSí	4.81%
EAJ/PNV	2.40%
CDC	0.96%
CCa–PNC	0.48%
ASG	0.48%

=== Maps ===
Election results by Congress of Deputies constituency.

Vote winner strength by constituency.

Vote winner strength by autonomous community.

== Aftermath ==
=== Outcome ===
The People's Party (PP) emerged as the largest party, securing the most seats—137—but just as in the previous election, failed to obtain an overall majority. The Spanish Socialist Workers' Party (PSOE) clung on to second place but fell to a new record low of 85, whereas Unidos Podemos, the alliance between Podemos and United Left (IU) remained at third place with 71 seats. The PP increased its seat count by a surprising 14, capitalising on losses by both PSOE and liberal Citizens (C's). Unidos Podemos' second placed projection failed to materialize at the polls, although they maintained the same number of seats as in the previous election. Overall, the parliamentary deadlock remained, as neither bloc could gather an absolute majority of seats. However, the PP–C's bloc gained strength, climbing from 163 to 169, whereas the PSOE–Podemos–IU bloc was reduced from 161 to 156. The attempted PSOE–C's pact was reduced to 117 seats, now outnumbered by the PP alone.

Regionally, the PP swept all the autonomous communities except for Catalonia and the Basque Country, where Unidos Podemos retained first place. The PSOE, which had narrowly won in its strongholds of Andalusia and Extremadura in the 2015 election, was pushed to second place in both of them, being unable to retain first place in any region only for the second time in democracy (the first being in 2011). Nonetheless, it recovered slightly on some of the regions where it performed the worst in December 2015, with notable advances in Madrid, Valencian Community, Navarre, Asturias, Galicia and the Canary Islands. However, this contrasted with setbacks in the party's own strongholds of Andalusia, Extremadura and Castile-La Mancha. The Unidos Podemos alliance only managed to improve on the 2015 combined results of Podemos and IU in the Basque Country and Navarre, suffering losses everywhere else.

In Catalonia, the Republican Left–Catalonia Yes coalition (ERC–CatSí) saw gains at the expense of Democratic Convergence of Catalonia (CDC), which lost both Girona and Lleida which the Democracy and Freedom coalition had won in 2015. This marked the first time in democracy that ERC managed to come out on top in any province in a general election. The Basque Nationalist Party (PNV) lost in Biscay only for the second time since the return of democracy, which cost them the loss of the province's 3rd seat to Unidos Podemos.

Failure in opinion polling was largely attributed to the sudden abstention of roughly 1 million Podemos' voters from December 2015, unsure of their party's chances of ruling after the election and partially disenchanted with politics at large after the failed negotiations in forming a government throughout the previous six months. At the same time, the PP result was attributed to a last-hour surge motivated by centre-right tactical voting against Pablo Iglesias, influenced by Unidos Podemos' strong showing in opinion polls. Voter turnout was a record low 66.5%, exceeding the previous lowest ever recorded turnout of 68.0% at the 1979 election. Of the four main parties, all except for the PP attracted fewer total votes than in 2015. The PSOE lost about 100,000 votes, the Unidos Podemos alliance 1,080,000 and C's 370,000. The PP received about 700,000 more votes.

=== Government formation ===
On 29 October, Mariano Rajoy succeeded in his investiture attempt with the support of 170 MPs to 111 against and 68 abstentions.

Investiture; Congress of Deputies; Nomination of Mariano Rajoy (PP)
Ballot →	31 August 2016	2 September 2016
Required majority →	176 out of 350	Simple
Yes: • PP (134); • C's (32); • UPN (2); • CCa (1); • FAC (1)	170 / 350	170 / 350
No: • PSOE (84); • UP–ECP–EM (67); • ERC (9); • PDeCAT (8); • PNV (5); • Compromís (4); • EH Bildu (2); • NCa (1)	180 / 350	180 / 350
Abstentions	0 / 350	0 / 350
Absentees	0 / 350	0 / 350

Investiture; Congress of Deputies; Nomination of Mariano Rajoy (PP)
Ballot →	27 October 2016	29 October 2016
Required majority →	176 out of 350	Simple
Yes: • PP (134); • C's (32); • UPN (2); • CCa (1); • FAC (1)	170 / 350	170 / 350
No: • PSOE (84) (15 on 29 Oct); • UP–ECP–EM (67); • ERC (9); • PDeCAT (8); • PNV (5); • Compromís (4); • EH Bildu (2); • NCa (1)	180 / 350	111 / 350
Abstentions: • PSOE (68) (on 29 Oct)	0 / 350	68 / 350
Absentees: • PSOE (1) (on 29 Oct)	0 / 350	1 / 350

=== 2017 motion of no confidence ===
On 14 June 2017, a motion of no confidence in the government of Mariano Rajoy tabled by Unidos Podemos (over a string of corruption scandals involving the ruling PP) was defeated 170 to 82, with the main opposition PSOE abstaining.

Motion of no confidence Congress of Deputies; Nomination of Pablo Iglesias (Podemos)
Ballot →	14 June 2017
Required majority →	176 out of 350
Yes: • UP–ECP–EM (67); • ERC (9); • Compromís (4); • EH Bildu (2)	82 / 350
No: • PP (134); • Cs (32); • UPN (2); • CCa (1); • FAC (1)	170 / 350
Abstentions: • PSOE (84); • PDeCAT (7); • PNV (5); • NCa (1)	97 / 350
Absentees: • PDeCAT (1)	1 / 350

=== 2018 motion of no confidence ===
A motion of no confidence in the Spanish government of Mariano Rajoy was held between 31 May and 1 June 2018. The motion was registered by the Spanish Socialist Workers' Party (PSOE) on 25 May after the ruling People's Party (PP) was found to have profited from the illegal kickbacks-for-contracts scheme of the Gürtel affair. The motion was successful and resulted in Mariano Rajoy being replaced by PSOE leader Pedro Sánchez as prime minister.

Motion of no confidence Congress of Deputies; Nomination of Pedro Sánchez (PSOE)
Ballot →	1 June 2018
Required majority →	176 out of 350
Yes: • PSOE (84); • UP–ECP–EM (67); • ERC (9); • PDeCAT (8); • PNV (5); • Compromís (4); • EH Bildu (2); • NCa (1)	180 / 350
No: • PP (134); • Cs (32); • UPN (2); • FAC (1)	169 / 350
Abstentions: • CCa (1)	1 / 350
Absentees	0 / 350

== Bibliography ==
Legislation

- Constitución Española (Constitution). Official State Gazette (in Spanish). 27 December 1978 [version as of 27 September 2011]. BOE-A-1978-31229.
- Ley Orgánica 5/1985, de 19 de junio, del Régimen Electoral General (Organic Law 5/1985). Official State Gazette (in Spanish). 19 June 1985 [version as of 31 March 2015]. BOE-A-1985-11672.
- Real Decreto 184/2016, de 3 de mayo, de disolución del Congreso de los Diputados y del Senado y de convocatoria de elecciones (Royal Decree 184/2016). Official State Gazette (in Spanish). 3 May 2016. BOE-A-2016-4280.

Other

- Carreras de Odriozola, Albert; Tafunell Sambola, Xavier (2005) [1989]. Estadísticas históricas de España, siglos XIX-XX (PDF) (in Spanish). Vol. 1 (II ed.). Bilbao: Fundación BBVA. pp. 1072–1097. ISBN 84-96515-00-1. Archived from the original (PDF) on 24 September 2015.
