= Opinion polling for the 2016 Spanish general election =

In the run up to the 2016 Spanish general election, various organisations carried out opinion polling to gauge voting intention in Spain during the term of the 11th Cortes Generales. Results of such polls are displayed in this article. The date range for these opinion polls is from the previous general election, held on 20 December 2015, to the day the next election was held, on 26 June 2016.

Voting intention estimates refer mainly to a hypothetical Congress of Deputies election. Polls are listed in reverse chronological order, showing the most recent first and using the dates when the survey fieldwork was done, as opposed to the date of publication. Where the fieldwork dates are unknown, the date of publication is given instead. The highest percentage figure in each polling survey is displayed with its background shaded in the leading party's colour. If a tie ensues, this is applied to the figures with the highest percentages. The "Lead" columns on the right shows the percentage-point difference between the parties with the highest percentages in a poll.

== Electoral polling ==
=== Nationwide polling ===
==== Graphical summary ====
Local regression trend line of poll results from 20 December 2015 to 26 June 2016, with each line corresponding to a political party.

==== Voting intention estimates ====
The table below lists nationwide voting intention estimates. Refusals are generally excluded from the party vote percentages, while question wording and the treatment of "don't know" responses and those not intending to vote may vary between polling organisations. When available, seat projections determined by the polling organisations are displayed below (or in place of) the percentages in a smaller font; 176 seats were required for an absolute majority in the Congress of Deputies.

Color key:

Poll conducted after legal ban on opinion polls Exit poll

Polling firm/Commissioner	Fieldwork date	Sample size	Turnout	PP	PSOE	Podemos	C's	IU–UPeC	ERC–CatSí	DiL CDC	PNV	PACMA	EH Bildu	CC	Unidos Podemos	Lead
2016 general election	26 Jun 2016	—N/a	66.5	33.0; 137	22.6; 85	(Note: Within Unidos Podemos.)	13.1; 32		2.7; 9	2.0; 8	1.2; 5	1.2; 0	0.8; 2	0.3; 1	21.2; 71	10.4
Sigma Dos/RTVE–FORTA	26 Jun 2016	132,000	?	28.5; 117/121	22.0; 81/85		11.8; 26/30		3.1; 11/12	1.4; 5	1.3; 5/6	–	1.0; 3/4	0.3; 1	25.6; 91/95	2.9
NC Report	25 Jun 2016	?	?	31.9; 128/132	22.0; 83/88		13.0; 30/33		2.4; 8/9	1.8; 7/8	1.1; 5/6	–	0.8; 2	0.3; 1	23.7; 76/80	8.2
GESOP/El Periòdic	23–25 Jun 2016	1,000	68–70	28.7; 116/120	21.6; 83/87		14.5; 37/41		–	–	–	–	–	–	23.9; 83/87	4.8
GESOP/El Periòdic	22–24 Jun 2016	900	70–72	28.7; 116/120	21.6; 83/87		14.9; 38/42		–	–	–	–	–	–	23.7; 83/87	5.0
GAD3/ABC	13–24 Jun 2016	4,000	?	30.4; 121/124	21.8; 84/86		13.2; 29/32		2.8; 10/11	1.6; 6	1.2; 5	–	0.9; 2	0.3; 0/1	24.8; 87/89	5.6
NC Report	23 Jun 2016	?	?	31.7; 126/131	21.6; 82/85		13.1; 31/34		2.3; 8/9	1.7; 6/7	1.1; 5/6	–	0.7; 2	0.3; 1	24.5; 79/84	7.2
GESOP/El Periòdic	21–23 Jun 2016	900	69–71	28.0; 114/118	21.8; 83/87		15.2; 40/44		–	–	–	–	–	–	24.0; 84/88	4.0
GESOP/El Periòdic	20–22 Jun 2016	900	69–71	28.2; 114/118	21.7; 83/87		15.2; 40/44		–	–	–	–	–	–	23.6; 83/87	4.6
NC Report	21 Jun 2016	?	?	31.3; 126/131	21.4; 81/84		13.2; 32/35		2.3; 8/9	1.7; 6/7	1.1; 5/6	–	0.7; 2	0.3; 1	25.1; 81/86	6.2
GESOP/El Periòdic	19–21 Jun 2016	900	68–70	28.5; 115/119	21.5; 82/86		15.2; 40/44		–	–	–	–	–	–	23.7; 83/87	4.8
GESOP/El Periòdic	18–20 Jun 2016	900	69–71	29.0; 116/120	21.5; 82/86		14.9; 38/42		–	–	–	–	–	–	23.7; 83/87	5.3
GAD3/ABC	13–20 Jun 2016	1,900	?	30.7; 122/125	21.2; 79/82		14.1; 36/38		? 9	? 6	? 5	–	? 2	? 0/1	24.9; 84/86	5.8
GIPEyOP	6–20 Jun 2016	10,244	?	27.8– 31.2; 114/130	20.6– 23.3; 74/88		13.3– 15.8; 33/45		2.2– 3.3; 8/11	1.6– 2.5; 5/9	0.8– 1.5; 3/6	–	0.6– 1.3; 1/4	–	23.0– 26.2; 80/92	4.8– 5.0
Redondo & Asociados/Expansión	19 Jun 2016	?	?	29.4; 121	21.5; 83		15.1; 37		? 9	? 7	? 5	–	? 2	? 1	24.9; 85	4.5
JM&A/Público	19 Jun 2016	?	69.0	29.8; 119	22.1; 85		13.9; 34		2.4; 9	2.2; 9	1.3; 6	–	0.9; 2	0.3; 1	23.9; 85	5.9
Infortécnica	19 Jun 2016	2,071	?	? 121/129	? 84/88		? 40/44		–	–	–	–	–	–	? 71/77	?
InvyMark/laSexta	17–19 Jun 2016	1,200	?	30.1	19.9		13.8		–	–	–	–	–	–	26.1	4.0
GESOP/El Periódico	17–19 Jun 2016	900	70–72	28.3; 114/118	21.9; 83/87		14.9; 38/42		–	–	–	–	–	–	24.0; 83/87	4.3
TNS Demoscopia	13–19 Jun 2016	500	70–71	29.6	21.0		14.8		–	–	–	–	–	–	24.7	4.9
Encuestamos	11–19 Jun 2016	2,400	?	30.6; 125/129	22.0; 84/88		13.6; 31/35		2.2; 6/9	2.0; 5/8	1.2; 4/7	–	0.8; 1/3	0.2; 0/1	23.9; 85/89	6.7
GESOP/El Periódico	16–18 Jun 2016	900	71–73	28.8; 116/120	21.6; 81/85		15.4; 40/44		–	–	–	–	–	–	23.7; 83/87	5.1
GESOP/El Periódico	15–17 Jun 2016	900	70–72	28.3; 114/118	21.2; 80/84		15.6; 40/44		–	–	–	–	–	–	24.2; 84/88	4.1
Celeste-Tel/eldiario.es	14–17 Jun 2016	1,100	66.5	30.5; 123/128	21.8; 84/86		13.3; 32/34		2.4; 8	1.7; 6	1.1; 5	0.8; 0	0.8; 2	0.3; 1	25.3; 83/88	5.2
A+M/20minutos	13–17 Jun 2016	4,000	68.8	28.8; 118/124	21.7; 79/82		16.2; 41/48		2.3; 8/9	1.7; 6/7	1.1; 5	–	0.8; 3	0.2; 1	24.3; 78/86	4.5
Hamalgama Métrica/La Provincia	8–17 Jun 2016	1,450	69.7	30.4; 125/133	21.0; 75/85		12.5; 30/38		2.1; 7/9	2.0; 6/8	1.3; 6/7	–	0.8; 2	0.3; 1	26.2; 72/93	4.2
Netquest/El Español	7–17 Jun 2016	2,000	?	30.4; 125	20.4; 75		15.2; 42		–	–	–	–	–	–	24.0; 85	6.4
NC Report/La Razón	5–17 Jun 2016	2,000	64.6	31.1; 126/131	21.2; 80/83		13.2; 33/35		2.3; 8/9	1.7; 6/7	1.1; 5/6	–	0.8; 2	0.3; 1	25.4; 82/87	5.7
InvyMark/laSexta	15–16 Jun 2016	?	?	29.8	20.4		14.1		–	–	–	–	–	–	25.3	4.5
Sigma Dos/El Mundo	14–16 Jun 2016	1,500	?	30.5; 124/129	20.0; 73/78		14.1; 35/40		2.4; 8/9	1.8; 5/6	1.2; 4/6	–	? 2	? 0/1	24.8; 86/92	5.7
GESOP/El Periódico	14–16 Jun 2016	900	69–71	28.6; 114/118	20.8; 79/83		15.6; 40/44		–	–	–	–	–	–	24.1; 84/88	4.5
GAD3/ABC	13–16 Jun 2016	1,400	?	30.3; 121/124	21.4; 80/83		14.4; 38/40		2.3; 9	1.7; 6	1.2; 5	–	0.8; 2	0.3; 0/1	24.6; 84/85	5.7
Celeste-Tel/eldiario.es	13–16 Jun 2016	1,100	66.4	30.3; 123/128	21.8; 83/86		13.4; 32/34		2.4; 8	1.7; 6	1.2; 5	0.8; 0	0.8; 2	0.3; 1	25.1; 82/87	5.2
MyWord/Cadena SER	13–16 Jun 2016	1,502	?	28.9; 118/123	20.4; 75/80		14.4; 38/39		–	–	–	–	–	–	24.8; 87/90	4.1
DYM/El Confidencial	14–15 Jun 2016	1,011	72–73	29.0; 116/117	21.0; 81/82		15.2; 41		? 9/10	? 8	? 5/6	–	? 2	? 1	24.9; 85/89	4.1
Metroscopia/El País	13–15 Jun 2016	1,800	70	29.0; 113/116	20.5; 78/85		14.5; 37/41		–	–	–	–	–	–	26.0; 92/95	3.0
GESOP/El Periódico	13–15 Jun 2016	900	68–70	28.3; 113/117	20.8; 79/83		15.4; 40/44		–	–	–	–	–	–	24.5; 85/89	3.8
Advice Strategic/Europa Press	5–15 Jun 2016	2,500	?	29.6	20.5		14.8		–	–	–	–	–	–	25.1	4.5
Simple Lógica	1–15 Jun 2016	1,226	70.9	29.2	22.5		15.4		–	–	–	–	–	–	23.5	5.7
GESOP/El Periódico	12–14 Jun 2016	900	69–71	27.8; 112/116	21.1; 81/85		15.2; 39/43		–	–	–	–	–	–	24.7; 85/89	3.1
Redondo & Asociados/Tiempo	9–14 Jun 2016	1,000	?	29.2; 122	21.1; 80		15.3; 38		2.2; 9	1.5; 7	1.1; 5	–	0.9; 2	0.3; 1	24.6; 86	4.6
Celeste-Tel/eldiario.es	8–14 Jun 2016	1,100	66.3	29.8; 121/126	22.0; 83/86		13.8; 35/36		2.4; 8	1.7; 6/7	1.2; 6	1.0; 0	0.8; 2	0.3; 1	24.9; 80/84	4.9
JM&A/Público	13 Jun 2016	?	69.0	29.2; 118	21.1; 80		15.1; 39		2.4; 9	2.2; 9	1.2; 5	–	0.9; 2	0.3; 1	24.4; 87	4.8
GESOP/El Periódico	11–13 Jun 2016	900	70–72	28.0; 113/117	21.0; 80/84		14.9; 38/42		–	–	–	–	–	–	24.9; 86/90	3.1
TNS Demoscopia	6–12 Jun 2016	500	69–70	29.0	21.3		15.6		–	–	–	–	–	–	24.5	4.5
SYM Consulting/Valencia Plaza	7–10 Jun 2016	1,816	72.8	29.7; 122/125	22.9; 79/82		13.4; 36/38		? 7/8	? 6/7	? 5	–	? 3	? 0/1	24.4; 87/89	5.3
NC Report/La Razón	5–10 Jun 2016	1,000	?	30.6; 126/130	21.3; 81/83		13.7; 35/37		2.3; 8/9	1.7; 6/7	1.1; 5/6	–	0.8; 2	0.3; 1	24.8; 81/86	5.8
Netquest/El Español	1–10 Jun 2016	2,000	?	28.8; 117	21.0; 78		15.8; 45		–	–	–	–	–	–	24.7; 87	4.1
GAD3/La Vanguardia	6–9 Jun 2016	1,016	70	29.8; 119/122	21.4; 80/82		14.9; 40/41		2.4; 8/9	1.8; 6/7	1.2; 5	–	0.9; 2	0.3; 0/1	24.3; 85/87	5.5
Sondaxe/La Voz de Galicia	1–9 Jun 2016	1,005	?	29.2; 121	21.4; 85		12.9; 34		2.4; 8	1.9; 6	0.9; 3	–	0.9; 3	–	26.1; 90	3.1
Metroscopia/El País	7–8 Jun 2016	1,200	70	28.9	20.8		15.9		–	–	–	–	–	–	25.4	3.5
InvyMark/laSexta	6–7 Jun 2016	?	?	30.1	20.0		14.4		2.6	1.7	1.3	–	–	–	24.8	5.3
GESOP/El Periódico	3–7 Jun 2016	1,816	?	27.9; 113/117	21.2; 80/84		15.5; 40/44		2.3; 8/9	1.6; 5/6	–	–	–	–	24.5; 84/88	3.4
Celeste-Tel/eldiario.es	1–7 Jun 2016	1,100	65.6	29.7; 122/125	22.1; 83/86		14.3; 36/37		2.4; 7/8	1.7; 5/6	1.2; 6	1.0; 0	0.9; 2	0.3; 1	24.4; 79/85	5.3
Encuestamos	26 May–5 Jun 2016	2,000	?	30.4; 122/126	21.9; 84/87		13.6; 31/34		2.3; 7/9	2.0; 5/7	1.3; 4/6	–	0.7; 1/2	0.2; 0/1	23.6; 87/90	6.8
Netquest/El Español	1–3 Jun 2016	1,000	?	27.7; 113	21.6; 82		15.4; 44		–	–	–	–	–	–	24.3; 86	3.4
NC Report/La Razón	30 May–3 Jun 2016	2,000	63.9	30.5; 125/130	21.4; 80/83		13.9; 37/39		2.3; 8/9	1.7; 6	1.1; 5/6	–	0.8; 2	0.3; 1	24.5; 80/84	6.0
Sigma Dos/El Mundo	31 May–2 Jun 2016	1,000	?	31.0; 130	20.3; 77		14.0; 37		2.6; 9	2.2; 8	1.3; 6	–	–	–	23.7; 80	7.3
JM&A/Público	1 Jun 2016	?	69.5	28.7; 118	21.7; 83		14.8; 38		2.3; 8	2.5; 10	1.3; 6	–	0.9; 2	0.4; 1	24.1; 84	4.6
PSOE	1 Jun 2016	1,000	?	27.9	23.8		14.5		–	–	–	–	–	–	22.4	4.1
Metroscopia/El País	31 May–1 Jun 2016	1,200	68	28.5	20.2		16.6		–	–	–	–	–	–	25.6	2.9
CDC	31 May 2016	?	69	? 117	? 79		? 41		? 8	? 9	? 5	–	? 2	? 1	? 88	?
NC Report/La Razón	16–27 May 2016	2,000	?	30.5; 124/130	21.3; 80/82		14.2; 38/40		2.2; 8	1.6; 5/6	1.1; 5/6	–	0.8; 2	0.3; 1	24.7; 79/84	5.8
GAD3/ABC	23–26 May 2016	1,000	70	29.6; 121	21.6; 86		14.8; 40		2.4; 9	2.2; 8	1.2; 6	–	0.9; 2	0.3; 1	22.5; 77	7.1
Advice Strategic/Europa Press	19–25 May 2016	2,500	?	29.8	20.4		14.7		–	–	–	–	–	–	24.4	5.4
MyWord/Cadena SER	20–24 May 2016	1,000	?	29.2	20.7		14.2		–	–	–	–	–	–	24.8	4.4
CIS	4–22 May 2016	17,488	?	29.2; 118/121	21.2; 78/80		14.6; 38/39		2.4; 8/9	1.8; 6/7	1.2; 5	–	0.9; 3	0.2; 0	25.6; 88/92	3.6
Encuestamos	2–22 May 2016	2,000	?	30.3; 121/125	22.9; 87/90		13.9; 33/36		2.4; 7/9	2.2; 6/8	1.1; 4/6	–	0.6; 1/2	0.3; 1/2	23.2; 84/87	7.1
Celeste-Tel/eldiario.es	16–20 May 2016	1,100	65.0	29.5; 120/122	22.0; 84/87		14.9; 38/41		2.3; 7/8	1.5; 5/6	1.2; 6	1.1; 0	0.9; 2	0.3; 1	24.2; 78/82	5.3
NC Report/La Razón	9–20 May 2016	2,500	63.5	30.4; 125/130	21.1; 80/83		14.5; 38/40		2.3; 8	1.5; 6	1.1; 6	–	0.8; 2	0.3; 1	24.9; 77/82	5.5
Metroscopia/El País	17–18 May 2016	1,200	72	28.4	20.1		16.4		–	–	–	–	–	–	22.9	5.5
Metroscopia/El País	17–18 May 2016	1,200	68	29.9	20.2		15.5		–	–	–	–	–	–	23.2	6.7
Metroscopia/El País	17–18 May 2016	1,200	63	31.5	21.1		13.3		–	–	–	–	–	–	23.7	7.8
GIPEyOP	12–18 May 2016	2,940	?	29.3; 113/120	21.9; 85/89		13.3; 33/36		2.5; 9	2.1; 7/8	1.2; 5	–	0.8; 2	0.3; 1	24.3; 82/88	5.0
Redondo & Asociados/Tiempo	13–17 May 2016	1,000	70.1	29.4; 126	21.2; 82		15.1; 38		2.2; 9	1.5; 7	1.1; 6	–	0.9; 2	0.3; 1	24.3; 79	5.1
JM&A/Público	13 May 2016	?	69.2	27.8; 112	20.3; 73		16.6; 52		2.3; 8	2.3; 9	1.3; 5	–	0.9; 2	0.3; 1	24.5; 88	3.3
Netquest/El Español	10–13 May 2016	1,000	?	30.8; 123	19.7; 73		14.7; 40		–	–	–	–	–	–	23.7; 84	7.1
InvyMark/laSexta	9–13 May 2016	?	?	29.6	20.1		15.1		–	–	–	–	–	–	24.2	5.4
NC Report/La Razón	9–12 May 2016	1,500	?	30.2; 125/130	21.0; 80/84		14.7; 39/41		2.2; 8	1.5; 6	1.1; 6	–	0.9; 2	0.3; 1	24.9; 76/81	5.3
Simple Lógica	2–10 May 2016	1,035	71.7	29.9	21.5	14.2	17.7	7.9	–	–	–	–	–	–	–	8.4
NC Report/La Razón	25 Apr–7 May 2016	2,000	63.6	30.2; 126/130	20.8; 80/84		15.0; 39/42		2.1; 8	1.5; 6	1.2; 6	–	0.8; 2	0.3; 1	24.7; 75/80	5.5
Celeste-Tel/eldiario.es	2–6 May 2016	1,100	64.5	29.2; 120/123	22.4; 85/89		15.5; 39/41		2.4; 8/9	1.5; 5/6	1.2; 5	1.0; 0	0.9; 2	0.3; 1	24.2; 75/80	5.0
Celeste-Tel/eldiario.es	2–6 May 2016	1,100	64.5	29.1; 124/126	21.9; 88/90	19.8; 63/67	15.4; 41/43	5.3; 5/7	2.4; 8/9	1.5; 5/6	1.2; 5/6	0.9; 0	0.9; 2	0.3; 1	–	7.2
Encuestamos	23 Apr–2 May 2016	1,800	?	30.0; 129/132	22.8; 91/93	19.1; 58/61	14.1; 40/41	4.8; 4/5	2.4; 9/10	2.3; 8/9	1.2; 5/6	–	0.6; 1/2	0.3; 1/2	–	7.2
NC Report/La Razón	18–30 Apr 2016	2,000	63.9	29.9; 127/132	20.4; 82/85	20.9; 67/70	15.0; 41/45	5.0; 4/6	–	–	–	–	–	–	–	9.0
GAD3/ABC	26–29 Apr 2016	800	69	29.3; 129	22.6; 95	17.0; 50	13.9; 41	5.3; 8	2.1; 8	1.8; 8	1.3; 6	–	0.9; 4	0.4; 1	–	6.7
InvyMark/laSexta	25–29 Apr 2016	1,200	?	28.7	19.4	20.7	15.4	4.8	–	–	–	–	–	–	–	8.0
Metroscopia/El País	26–28 Apr 2016	1,200	70	29.0	20.3	18.1	16.9	6.6	–	–	–	–	–	–	–	8.7
NC Report/La Razón	18–23 Apr 2016	2,000	63.9	29.9; 127/132	20.5; 82/85	21.2; 68/71	15.2; 41/46	4.6; 3/5	–	–	–	–	–	–	–	8.7
Netquest/El Español	18–22 Apr 2016	1,000	?	27.3	20.2	18.7	17.0	5.8	–	–	–	–	–	–	–	7.1
Sigma Dos/El Mundo	18–22 Apr 2016	800	?	29.5; 126	22.2; 91	18.6; 58	14.7; 45	4.5; 6	2.6; 9	1.9; 6	1.1; 6	–	–	–	–	7.3
Encuestamos	1–20 Apr 2016	2,000	?	30.3; 131/135	23.0; 92/94	19.4; 60/63	14.2; 40/42	4.4; 3/5	2.6; 9/10	2.2; 7/8	1.1; 5/6	–	0.6; 1/2	0.3; 1/2	–	7.3
NC Report/La Razón	12–16 Apr 2016	2,400	64.2	29.8; 128/131	20.7; 83/85	20.9; 67/71	15.4; 42/47	4.5; 3/5	2.2; 8	1.5; 6	1.2; 6	–	0.7; 2	0.3; 1	–	8.9
InvyMark/laSexta	11–15 Apr 2016	?	?	28.6	20.4	19.2	15.8	5.4	–	–	–	–	–	–	–	8.2
TNS Demoscopia	12–14 Apr 2016	1,000	68–69	29.4	22.3	17.5	15.8	6.0	–	–	–	–	–	–	–	7.1
NC Report	7–14 Apr 2016	955	?	30.7	21.2	21.9	14.5	4.9	–	–	–	–	–	–	–	8.8
JM&A/Público	13 Apr 2016	?	66.9	27.9; 115	19.8; 77	20.9; 69	17.0; 60	3.6; 2	2.4; 9	2.4; 9	1.3; 6	–	0.9; 2	0.4; 1	–	7.0
Simple Lógica	4–12 Apr 2016	1,047	73.8	28.3	20.6	16.9	17.7	6.9	–	–	–	–	–	–	–	7.7
IMOP/Llorente & Cuenca	6–10 Apr 2016	1,027	69	28.8; 123	22.2; 90	15.6; 48	16.6; 53	7.5; 12	2.2; 9	1.7; 6	1.1; 6	–	0.7; 2	? 1	–	6.6
Advice Strategic/Europa Press	4–10 Apr 2016	2,500	?	29.1	21.7	17.4	16.0	5.5	2.3	2.0	1.2	–	–	–	–	7.4
CIS	1–10 Apr 2016	2,490	?	27.4	21.6	17.7	15.6	5.4	2.5	1.9	1.0	–	0.7	0.4	–	5.8
NC Report/La Razón	4–9 Apr 2016	2,300	?	29.6; 127/129	21.0; 84/86	20.4; 64/69	15.5; 43/48	4.4; 2/4	2.3; 8/9	1.5; 6/7	1.3; 6	–	0.7; 2	0.3; 1	–	8.6
GAD3/ABC	6–7 Apr 2016	800	68	29.2; 127	23.3; 95	15.5; 46	14.4; 45	6.7; 11	2.3; 9	2.0; 8	1.1; 6	–	0.8; 3	0.2; 0	–	5.9
Metroscopia	5–6 Apr 2016	1,200	70	29.0	20.1	17.0	17.7	6.7	–	–	–	–	–	–	–	8.9
DYM/El Confidencial	30 Mar–6 Apr 2016	1,036	?	29.2	20.7	19.6	15.2	5.9	–	–	–	–	–	–	–	8.5
Celeste-Tel/eldiario.es	1–5 Apr 2016	1,100	64.9	29.1; 123/125	22.2; 89/90	19.4; 61/66	15.9; 44/47	4.5; 3/5	2.7; 9/10	1.8; 7	1.1; 5/6	1.0; 0	0.7; 2	0.3; 1	–	6.9
Estudio de Sociología Consultores	28 Mar–5 Apr 2016	2,300	?	29.2; 128	23.7; 92	17.5; 58	16.1; 45	4.6; 2	3.0; 11	1.7; 5	–	–	–	–	–	4.5
Redondo & Asociados/Tiempo	28 Mar–4 Apr 2016	1,000	69.7	29.1; 126	21.8; 87	19.1; 61	15.7; 47	4.9; 4	2.4; 9	1.7; 7	1.3; 6	–	0.7; 2	0.3; 1	–	7.3
NC Report/La Razón	22 Mar–2 Apr 2016	1,800	?	29.4; 126/128	21.8; 86/88	19.2; 62/64	15.5; 44/49	4.6; 2/4	2.4; 9	1.6; 7	1.3; 6	–	0.7; 2	0.3; 1	–	7.6
InvyMark/laSexta	28 Mar–1 Apr 2016	1,200	?	28.6	21.6	19.9	15.2	4.1	–	–	–	–	–	–	–	7.0
Sigma Dos/El Mundo	28–31 Mar 2016	800	?	30.2; 128	22.0; 90	16.7; 49	16.2; 52	4.5; 6	2.3; 8	2.1; 7	1.1; 6	–	–	–	–	8.2
Metroscopia/El País	28–30 Mar 2016	1,200	73	27.7	21.0	15.9	18.8	6.9	–	–	–	–	–	–	–	6.7
Netquest/El Español	23–30 Mar 2016	1,002	?	27.5	19.3	17.3	16.9	7.3	–	–	–	–	–	–	–	8.2
NC Report/La Razón	22–27 Mar 2016	900	?	29.4; 126/128	22.0; 87/89	19.4; 63/65	15.3; 43/48	4.6; 2/4	2.4; 9	1.7; 7	1.3; 6	–	0.7; 2	0.3; 1	–	7.4
Encuestamos	1–20 Mar 2016	2,000	?	30.1; 128/131	23.2; 93/95	19.6; 61/64	14.2; 40/42	4.1; 2/4	2.6; 9/10	2.2; 7/8	1.2; 6/7	–	0.6; 1/2	0.3; 1/2	–	6.9
NC Report/La Razón	13–17 Mar 2016	1,000	64.7	29.3; 124/128	22.1; 87/90	19.5; 62/66	15.1; 44/48	4.4; 2/4	2.3; 9	1.8; 7	1.2; 6	–	0.8; 2	0.4; 1	–	7.2
MyWord/Cadena SER	10–14 Mar 2016	1,004	?	27.0	20.9	15.9	18.0	7.1	–	–	–	–	–	–	–	6.1
InvyMark/laSexta	7–11 Mar 2016	?	?	28.5	20.8	21.5	14.3	4.3	–	–	–	–	–	–	–	7.0
NC Report/La Razón	1–11 Mar 2016	2,300	?	29.3; 126/128	22.0; 87/90	19.8; 63/67	15.1; 42/47	4.4; 2/4	2.4; 9	1.8; 7	1.2; 6	–	0.8; 2	0.3; 1	–	7.3
GAD3/ABC	7–10 Mar 2016	800	67	28.2; 123	24.2; 98	18.7; 60	14.1; 42	3.2; 1	2.9; 10	1.8; 7	1.2; 6	–	0.7; 2	0.3; 1	–	4.0
Metroscopia/El País	8–9 Mar 2016	1,200	75	26.0	23.1	16.8	19.5	5.4	–	–	–	–	–	–	–	2.9
Sondaxe/La Voz de Galicia	5–9 Mar 2016	1,002	?	28.6; 124	22.0; 89	19.1; 60	15.6; 48	4.2; 4	2.5; 8	2.1; 8	1.2; 6	–	0.8; 2	0.3; 1	–	6.6
Simple Lógica	1–9 Mar 2016	1,206	72.5	26.2	21.6	18.3	17.1	7.9	–	–	–	–	–	–	–	4.6
GESOP/El Periódico	5–8 Mar 2016	1,000	?	26.4; 107/110	21.9; 88/91	18.1; 58/61	17.8; 59/62	5.9; 7/9	2.4; 9/10	1.5; 6/7	–	–	–	–	–	4.5
Celeste-Tel/eldiario.es	2–5 Mar 2016	1,100	66.1	28.6; 120/124	22.6; 91/94	19.6; 63/67	15.7; 42/45	4.6; 3/5	2.5; 9	1.9; 7	1.1; 5	1.0; 0	0.8; 2	0.3; 1	–	6.0
NC Report/La Razón	1–4 Mar 2016	1,400	65.0	29.2; 125/128	21.8; 87/90	20.2; 64/67	14.9; 42/46	4.2; 2/4	2.4; 9	1.9; 7/8	1.2; 6	–	0.8; 2	0.4; 1	–	7.4
JM&A/Público	3 Mar 2016	?	67.3	26.5; 112	20.2; 78	20.9; 69	16.9; 61	3.3; 1	2.6; 9	2.4; 9	1.3; 6	–	1.0; 4	0.4; 1	–	5.6
InvyMark/laSexta	22–26 Feb 2016	1,200	?	26.8	20.3	22.1	15.8	4.5	–	–	–	–	–	–	–	4.7
DYM/El Confidencial	19–23 Feb 2016	1,071	?	25.6	22.1	19.8	17.6	5.4	–	–	–	–	–	–	–	3.5
InvyMark/laSexta	15–19 Feb 2016	?	?	26.4	21.8	20.7	16.2	4.2	–	–	–	–	–	–	–	4.6
Sigma Dos/El Mundo	16–18 Feb 2016	1,000	?	27.8; 119	23.1; 93	18.8; 60	15.3; 50	4.0; 3	2.4; 9	2.1; 7	1.1; 6	–	–	–	–	4.7
NC Report/La Razón	10–18 Feb 2016	1,400	65.3	28.9; 125/127	21.4; 87/89	21.1; 68/72	14.2; 41/42	3.4; 1/2	2.5; 9	2.0; 7/8	1.2; 6	–	0.8; 2	0.3; 1	–	7.5
Encuestamos	1–17 Feb 2016	1,800	?	27.7; 117/119	24.2; 98/100	20.5; 66/68	13.9; 38/40	3.4; 1/2	2.5; 9/10	2.1; 7/8	1.1; 6	–	0.9; 2/3	0.3; 1/2	–	3.5
GIPEyOP	7–16 Feb 2016	1,960	?	27.1	22.3	22.3	14.9	3.2	2.4	2.4	1.2	–	0.7	–	–	4.8
GAD3/ABC	8–11 Feb 2016	800	68	27.9; 119	20.8; 84	21.4; 75	14.9; 44	3.3; 1	2.6; 10	1.9; 8	1.4; 6	–	0.7; 2	0.3; 1	–	6.5
Estudio de Sociología Consultores	1–10 Feb 2016	2,100	?	29.0; 125	22.6; 94	20.9; 69	14.0; 33	4.0; 2	3.4; 9	1.8; 8	1.1; 6	–	–	–	–	6.4
JM&A/Público	7 Feb 2016	?	70.5	27.8; 118	20.4; 84	21.2; 75	14.9; 44	3.8; 2	2.6; 9	2.3; 9	1.2; 6	–	0.9; 2	0.3; 1	–	6.6
Simple Lógica	1–5 Feb 2016	1,048	75.6	26.9	21.7	20.3	18.9	5.1	–	–	–	–	–	–	–	5.2
Celeste-Tel/eldiario.es	1–5 Feb 2016	1,100	66.6	28.5; 120/124	22.4; 89/92	20.4; 65/69	15.1; 41/46	3.7; 2	2.7; 9/10	2.0; 7/8	1.2; 5/6	1.0; 0	0.8; 2	0.4; 1	–	6.1
InvyMark/laSexta	1–5 Feb 2016	?	?	27.8	21.1	21.6	15.1	3.8	–	–	–	–	–	–	–	6.2
Metroscopia/El País	3–4 Feb 2016	1,000	73	24.0	23.3	19.9	18.5	4.3	–	–	–	–	–	–	–	0.7
GAD3/ABC	15–21 Jan 2016	802	70	30.1; 131	21.3; 89	20.0; 65	13.4; 38	2.9; 1	2.4; 9	2.1; 8	1.1; 5	–	1.1; 3	0.3; 1	–	8.8
NC Report/La Razón	4–21 Jan 2016	1,900	65.6	30.7; 130/132	21.1; 86/88	21.9; 70/73	12.0; 30/33	3.4; 1/2	2.4; 9	2.2; 7/8	1.2; 6	–	0.8; 2	0.3; 1	–	8.8
MyWord/Cadena SER	15–19 Jan 2016	1,000	?	28.0	21.3	20.3	14.4	4.7	–	–	–	–	–	–	–	6.7
Redondo & Asociados	16 Jan 2016	?	?	30.5; 130	20.7; 79	22.8; 82	10.9; 31	–	–	–	–	–	–	–	–	7.7
InvyMark/laSexta	11–15 Jan 2016	?	?	30.8	20.8	21.6	12.6	3.5	–	–	–	–	–	–	–	9.2
Celeste-Tel/eldiario.es	4–15 Jan 2016	1,100	67.5	30.2; 128/130	21.9; 87/90	22.1; 68/73	12.6; 33/35	3.3; 2	2.5; 9	2.1; 7/8	1.1; 5/6	1.0; 0	0.9; 2	0.3; 1	–	8.1
NC Report	4–15 Jan 2016	955	?	30.5	22.1	20.7	13.4	3.6	–	–	–	–	–	–	–	8.4
Encuestamos	1–15 Jan 2016	1,800	?	33.2; 140/145	22.2; 90/92	21.4; 74/76	10.9; 17/21	2.9; 1	2.5; 10/11	2.0; 5/7	1.1; 5/6	–	0.8; 2	0.3; 1	–	11.0
Metroscopia/El País	12–14 Jan 2016	1,200	76.4	29.0	21.1	22.5	16.6	3.2	–	–	–	–	–	–	–	6.5
Estudio de Sociología Consultores	2–14 Jan 2016	2,200	?	32.4; 137	22.4; 90	20.5; 65	13.2; 30	3.9; 2	–	–	–	–	–	–	–	10.0
Simple Lógica	4–12 Jan 2016	1,050	77.1	30.0	20.4	21.3	14.7	4.8	–	–	–	–	–	–	–	8.7
IMOP/Llorente & Cuenca	9–11 Jan 2016	1,000	69	31.4; 136	23.5; 96	19.5; 63	11.8; 29	3.4; 1	2.3; 9	1.8; 7	1.2; 6	–	0.9; 2	? 1	–	7.9
CIS	2–11 Jan 2016	2,496	?	28.8	20.5	21.9	13.3	3.7	2.8	1.7	1.3	–	1.0	0.0	–	6.9
2015 general election	20 Dec 2015	—N/a	69.7	28.7; 123	22.0; 90	20.7; 69	13.9; 40	3.7; 2	2.4; 9	2.2; 8	1.2; 6	0.9; 0	0.9; 2	0.3; 1	–	6.7

==== Voting preferences ====
The table below lists raw, unweighted voting preferences.

Color key:

Poll conducted after legal ban on opinion polls

Polling firm/Commissioner	Fieldwork date	Sample size	PP	PSOE	Podemos	C's	IU–UPeC	ERC–CatSí	DiL CDC	PNV	EH Bildu	CC	Unidos Podemos	Question	X mark	Lead
2016 general election (Note: Does not include non-resident citizens.)	26 Jun 2016	—N/a	22.9	15.7		9.0		1.8	1.4	0.8	0.5	0.2	14.6	—N/a	30.2	7.2
GESOP/El Periòdic	23–25 Jun 2016	1,000	18.0	14.9		9.6		1.9	1.2	1.0	0.8	0.0	20.2	24.4	3.9	2.2
GESOP/El Periòdic	22–24 Jun 2016	900	20.3	16.1		10.2		2.1	1.3	0.9	1.0	0.1	19.7	20.1	4.1	0.6
GESOP/El Periòdic	21–23 Jun 2016	900	20.1	16.1		11.9		2.1	1.2	1.1	0.6	0.1	19.7	18.7	4.7	0.4
GESOP/El Periòdic	20–22 Jun 2016	900	21.3	14.8		12.6		2.4	1.2	0.9	0.9	0.3	19.2	17.9	4.0	2.2
GESOP/El Periòdic	19–21 Jun 2016	900	19.6	14.8		12.2		2.4	1.1	0.9	0.8	0.2	19.4	19.4	4.6	0.2
GESOP/El Periòdic	18–20 Jun 2016	900	19.3	15.8		11.2		2.7	0.9	0.9	0.8	0.2	18.7	20.2	4.6	0.6
GESOP/El Periódico	17–19 Jun 2016	900	19.2	16.4		11.1		2.7	0.9	1.0	0.4	0.0	18.7	21.2	5.0	0.5
GESOP/El Periódico	16–18 Jun 2016	900	19.9	16.1		12.2		2.3	0.7	0.9	0.4	0.0	19.8	19.7	4.8	0.1
GESOP/El Periódico	15–17 Jun 2016	900	20.3	14.8		11.9		1.7	0.8	0.7	0.3	0.0	20.4	20.4	4.9	0.1
GESOP/El Periódico	14–16 Jun 2016	900	18.4	15.1		11.1		2.2	0.9	0.7	0.2	0.0	19.9	20.9	5.7	1.5
MyWord/Cadena SER	13–16 Jun 2016	1,502	14.2	11.1		13.0		2.6	1.8	0.6	0.2	0.2	25.9	19.3	3.8	11.7
DYM/El Confidencial	14–15 Jun 2016	1,011	13.9	11.6		10.3		–	–	–	–	–	18.0	32.5	6.9	4.1
Metroscopia/El País	13–15 Jun 2016	1,800	19.4	17.9		12.7		–	–	–	–	–	25.2	17.2		5.8
GESOP/El Periódico	13–15 Jun 2016	900	19.0	13.7		10.0		2.6	1.1	0.4	0.1	0.0	19.1	23.6	5.8	0.1
Simple Lógica	1–15 Jun 2016	1,226	17.9	12.2		10.8		–	–	–	–	–	14.1	24.3	15.3	3.8
GESOP/El Periódico	12–14 Jun 2016	900	18.6	14.0		9.6		2.7	1.1	0.7	0.2	0.0	19.1	25.1	5.0	0.5
GESOP/El Periódico	11–13 Jun 2016	900	20.1	13.6		9.2		1.8	1.3	0.7	0.3	0.0	19.8	24.2	5.4	0.3
Metroscopia/El País	7–8 Jun 2016	1,200	20.8	17.7		15.2		–	–	–	–	–	21.0	16.5		0.2
GESOP/El Periódico	3–7 Jun 2016	1,816	21.2	14.5		13.8		2.1	1.2	0.6	0.4	–	21.1	15.2	4.6	0.1
Metroscopia/El País	31 May–1 Jun 2016	1,200	18.9	16.0		14.0		–	–	–	–	–	22.5	22.2		3.6
MyWord/Cadena SER	20–24 May 2016	1,000	16.2	12.5		13.1		4.4	1.2	1.7	0.3	0.1	22.0	15.1	4.0	5.8
CIS	4–22 May 2016	17,488	16.8	14.6		8.5		1.8	1.0	0.8	0.5	0.1	18.2	22.0	11.0	1.4
Metroscopia/El País	17–18 May 2016	1,200	18.1	16.1		12.2		–	–	–	–	–	21.0	23.5		2.9
Simple Lógica	2–10 May 2016	1,035	16.1	12.6	10.4	13.7	7.4	–	–	–	–	–	–	21.9	14.2	2.4
GAD3/ABC	26–29 Apr 2016	800	23.4	18.2	12.5	12.1	4.1	1.1	1.3	1.0	0.7	0.2	–	–	–	5.2
Metroscopia/El País	26–28 Apr 2016	1,200	21.2	19.1	16.3	14.8	6.6	–	–	–	–	–	–	15.3		2.1
Netquest/El Español	18–22 Apr 2016	1,000	15.0	13.0	19.4	13.4	6.9	–	–	–	–	–	–	–	–	4.4
Simple Lógica	4–12 Apr 2016	1,047	14.9	13.5	11.8	13.1	6.5	–	–	–	–	–	–	19.8	15.6	1.4
CIS	1–10 Apr 2016	2,490	17.3	15.3	12.6	10.8	4.5	1.7	1.3	0.8	0.4	0.2	–	18.9	11.5	2.0
GAD3/ABC	6–7 Apr 2016	800	23.6	19.7	10.6	12.3	5.4	1.6	1.5	0.8	0.5	0.1	–	–	–	3.9
Netquest/El Español	23–30 Mar 2016	1,002	17.7	13.8	14.6	13.2	6.9	–	–	–	–	–	–	–	–	3.1
MyWord/Cadena SER	10–14 Mar 2016	1,004	12.1	13.1	15.5	13.4	8.1	3.6	0.9	0.3	0.2	0.1	–	18.9	5.3	2.1
GAD3/ABC	7–10 Mar 2016	800	23.4	20.8	12.3	12.6	3.0	2.4	1.2	0.9	0.2	0.2	–	–	–	2.6
Metroscopia/El País	8–9 Mar 2016	1,200	18.9	18.1	14.5	17.7	5.6	–	–	–	–	–	–	18.7		0.8
Simple Lógica	1–9 Mar 2016	1,206	15.1	13.8	11.7	11.4	8.1	–	–	–	–	–	–	22.2	12.3	1.3
GESOP/El Periódico	5–8 Mar 2016	1,000	20.5	18.1	15.5	17.8	7.3	2.5	1.2	0.6	0.5	–	–	9.0	3.3	2.3
GAD3/ABC	8–11 Feb 2016	800	21.4	16.7	15.8	14.1	2.7	1.4	1.3	0.8	0.3	0.1	–	–	–	4.7
Simple Lógica	1–5 Feb 2016	1,048	16.9	13.7	14.6	15.6	4.8	–	–	–	–	–	–	15.9	14.1	1.3
Metroscopia/El País	3–4 Feb 2016	1,000	17.2	17.8	18.0	14.5	4.7	–	–	–	–	–	–	20.4		0.2
GAD3/ABC	15–21 Jan 2016	802	24.4	17.6	15.1	10.1	2.2	1.5	1.1	0.8	1.0	0.3	–	–	–	6.8
MyWord/Cadena SER	15–19 Jan 2016	1,000	13.4	11.7	22.3	13.3	4.3	3.5	1.5	0.1	0.2	0.1	–	19.0	3.2	8.9
Metroscopia/El País	12–14 Jan 2016	1,200	22.2	17.6	21.6	12.6	4.0	–	–	–	–	–	–	16.7		0.6
Simple Lógica	4–12 Jan 2016	1,050	19.1	10.9	17.7	11.4	5.0	–	–	–	–	–	–	19.4	10.9	1.4
CIS	2–11 Jan 2016	2,496	18.2	14.5	18.4	8.3	3.1	2.6	1.2	0.8	0.9	0.0	–	17.6	10.1	0.2
2015 general election	20 Dec 2015	—N/a	20.8	16.0	15.0	10.1	2.7	1.7	1.6	0.9	0.6	0.2	–	—N/a	26.8	4.8

==== Victory likelihood ====
The table below lists opinion polling on the perceived likelihood of victory for each party in the event of a general election taking place.

Polling firm/Commissioner	Fieldwork date	Sample size	PP	PSOE	Podemos	C's	Unidos Podemos	Other/ None	Question	Lead
TNS Demoscopia	13–19 Jun 2016	500	70.7	4.7	–	1.3	2.5	1.8	19.0	66.0
TNS Demoscopia	6–12 Jun 2016	500	68.6	4.6	–	1.4	3.4	1.8	20.2	64.0
GESOP/El Periódico	3–7 Jun 2016	1,816	73.7	6.3	–	1.3	4.2	0.0	14.3	67.4
Metroscopia/El País	31 May–1 Jun 2016	1,200	77.0	7.0	–	2.0	6.0	8.0		70.0
CIS	4–22 May 2016	17,488	67.4	6.7	–	0.9	4.0	1.5	19.5	60.7
GAD3/ABC	26–29 Apr 2016	800	71.4	9.2	3.6	4.7	–	11.1		62.2
GAD3/ABC	6–7 Apr 2016	800	68.6	13.0	4.4	4.3	–	9.7		55.6
GAD3/ABC	7–10 Mar 2016	800	68.4	12.2	6.6	2.7	–	10.1		56.2
GESOP/El Periódico	5–8 Mar 2016	1,000	66.6	11.4	3.8	1.7	–	0.0	16.5	55.2
GAD3/ABC	8–11 Feb 2016	800	65.2	12.9	7.0	2.5	–	12.4		52.3
GAD3/ABC	15–21 Jan 2016	802	68.8	9.2	7.7	3.3	–	11.0		59.6

=== Hypothetical scenarios ===
==== Podemos–IU alliance (before confirmation) ====
Polling firm/Commissioner	Fieldwork date	Sample size	Turnout	PP	PSOE	C's	ERC–CatSí	DiL CDC	PNV	EH Bildu	CC	Unidos Podemos	Lead
Encuestamos	23 Apr–2 May 2016	1,800	?	30.0; 115/117	22.8; 87/89	14.1; 35/37	2.4; 7/8	2.3; 7/8	1.2; 4/5	0.6; 1/2	0.3; 0/1	23.9; 86/88	6.1
NC Report/La Razón	18–30 Apr 2016	2,000	63.9	30.1; 126/130	20.7; 80/83	15.3; 39/44	2.0; 8	1.5; 6	1.3; 6	0.8; 2	0.3; 1	24.5; 75/82	5.6
GAD3/ABC	26–29 Apr 2016	800	68	29.7; 125	23.2; 94	14.0; 39	2.2; 8	1.8; 7	1.3; 6	0.9; 2	0.4; 1	20.9; 68	6.5
Metroscopia/El País	26–28 Apr 2016	1,200	70	29.0	20.3	16.9	–	–	–	–	–	22.3	6.7
NC Report/La Razón	18–23 Apr 2016	2,000	63.9	30.2; 125/130	20.9; 80/83	15.5; 40/45	2.3; 8	1.6; 6	1.2; 6	0.8; 2	0.3; 1	24.1; 74/81	6.1
JM&A/Público	22 Apr 2016	?	68.6	27.8; 110	20.0; 72	16.5; 51	2.3; 8	2.3; 9	1.3; 5	0.8; 2	0.3; 1	25.2; 92	2.6
Sigma Dos/El Mundo	18–22 Apr 2016	800	?	29.8; 123	22.9; 90	15.2; 44	2.6; 9	1.9; 6	1.1; 5	–	–	21.5; 70	6.9
NC Report/La Razón	12–16 Apr 2016	2,400	64.2	30.1; 126/130	21.0; 83/85	15.6; 42/47	2.3; 8/9	1.6; 5/6	1.2; 6/7	0.7; 2	0.3; 1	23.7; 70/76	6.4
NC Report/La Razón	4–9 Apr 2016	2,300	?	30.0	21.4	15.8	2.4	1.6	1.3	0.7	0.3	23.1	6.9
Metroscopia	5–6 Apr 2016	1,200	70	29.0	20.1	17.7	–	–	–	–	–	20.8	8.2
Redondo & Asociados/Tiempo	28 Mar–4 Apr 2016	1,000	69.7	29.1; 125	21.8; 84	15.7; 38	2.4; 9	1.7; 7	1.3; 6	0.7; 2	0.3; 1	24.0; 78	5.1
NC Report/La Razón	22 Mar–2 Apr 2016	1,800	?	29.8	22.1	15.8	2.5	1.7	1.3	0.7	0.3	22.1	7.7
NC Report/La Razón	22–27 Mar 2016	900	?	29.8	22.4	15.5	2.5	1.8	1.3	0.7	0.3	22.3	7.4
Redondo & Asociados/Tiempo	16 Dec–25 Jan 2016	13,000	?	29.8; 131	19.4; 74	10.3; 18	? 9	? 8	? 6	? 2	? 1	25.6; 101	4.2
IMOP/Llorente & Cuenca	9–11 Jan 2016	1,000	69	31.4; 128	23.5; 93	11.8; 26	2.3; 9	1.8; 7	1.2; 6	0.9; 2	? 1	22.9; 78	7.9

==== PP candidates ====
Polling firm/Commissioner	Fieldwork date	Sample size	Turnout	PP (Mariano Rajoy)	PP (Soraya Sáenz de Santamaría)	PP (Cristina Cifuentes)	PSOE	Podemos	C's	IU–UPeC	Lead
Netquest/El Español	18–22 Apr 2016	1,000	?	–	–	29.1	19.2	19.9	16.1	7.5	9.2
Netquest/El Español	18–22 Apr 2016	1,000	?	–	30.9	–	20.0	19.9	15.8	7.0	10.9
Netquest/El Español	18–22 Apr 2016	1,000	?	27.0	–	–	20.6	20.0	17.9	7.3	6.4

==== PSOE candidates ====
Polling firm/Commissioner	Fieldwork date	Sample size	Turnout	PP	PSOE (Pedro Sánchez)	PSOE (Susana Díaz)	Podemos	C's	IU–UPeC	Lead
Netquest/El Español	18–22 Apr 2016	1,000	?	26.2	–	18.3	20.2	17.8	7.9	6.0
Netquest/El Español	18–22 Apr 2016	1,000	?	27.0	20.6	–	20.0	17.9	7.3	6.4
