= Marian Beitialarrangoitia =

Basque journalist and politician (born 1968)

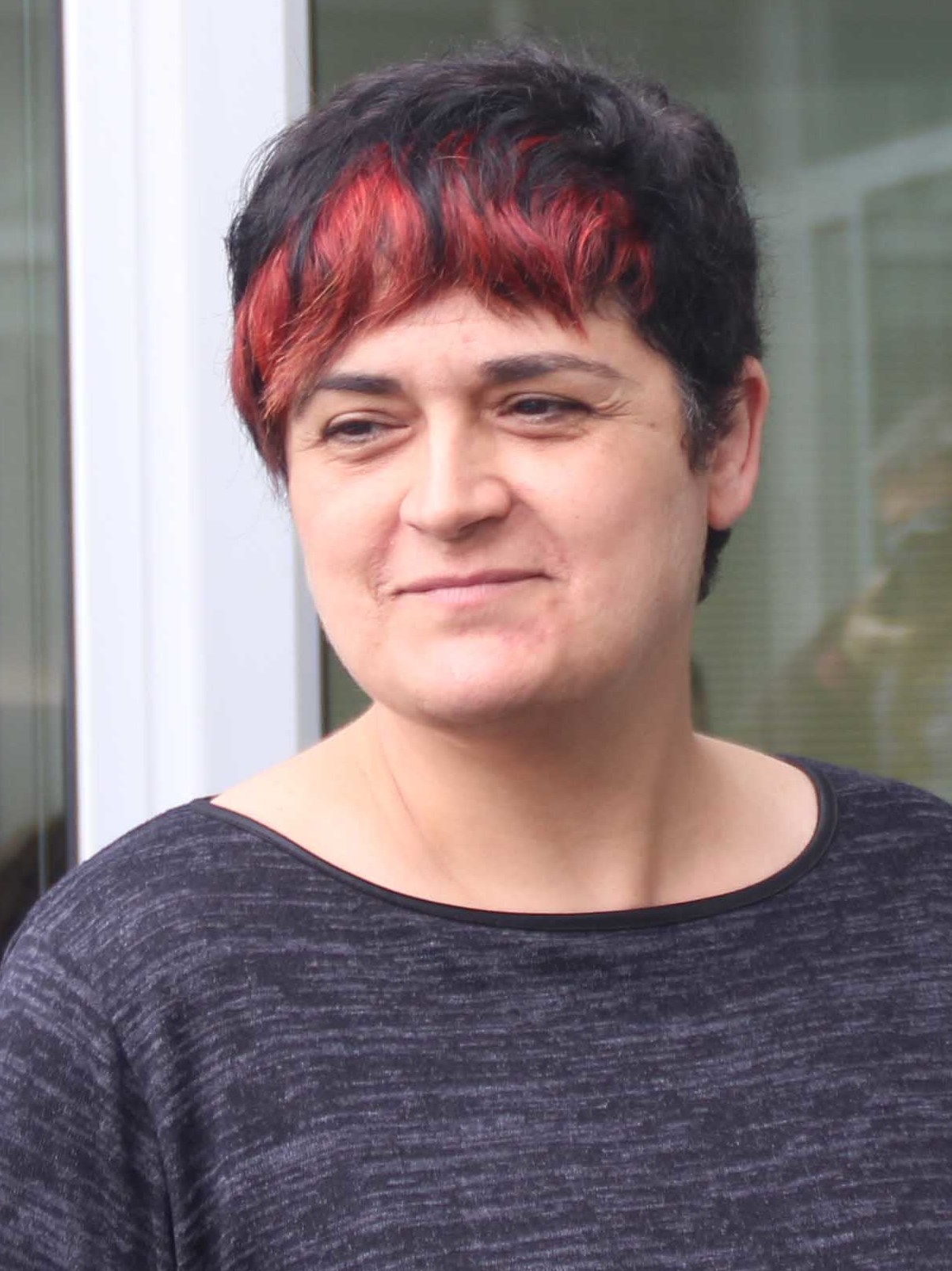
- Beitialarrangoitia in May 2016

Member of the Congress of Deputies of Spain
- In office 12 January 2016 – 21 May 2019
- Constituency: Gipuzkoa

Member of the Basque Parliament
- In office 20 November 2012 – 7 January 2016
- Succeeded by: Maider Otamendi Tolosa
- Constituency: Gipuzkoa

Mayor of Hernani
- In office 2007–2011
- Preceded by: José Antonio Rekondo Sanz
- Succeeded by: Luis Intxauspe Arozamena

Personal details
- Born: Maria Angeles Beitialarrangoitia Lizarralde; 20 January 1968 (age 58) Legazpia, Basque Country, Spain
- Party: Sortu
- Other political affiliations: EH Bildu
- Education: University of the Basque Country
- Occupation: Journalist

Maria Angeles Beitialarrangoitia Lizarralde (born 20 January 1968) is a Spanish journalist and politician. She was previously a member of the Congress of Deputies of Spain and Basque Parliament, and mayor of Hernani.

== Early life and education ==
Beitialarrangoitia was born on 20 January 1968 in Legazpia, Basque Country. She has degree in journalism from the University of the Basque Country.

== Career ==
Beitialarrangoitia worked for the Hots magazine and Hoska radio station in her youth. Later she worked at the Egin Irratia radio station, part of the Egin newspaper group. She moved to Hernani which was the base for the radio station and newspaper. In July 1998 judge Baltasar Garzón ordered the closure of both media outlets because of their alleged links to the separatist ETA. Beitialarrangoitia became active on groups, such as Gestoras pro Amnistía, supporting the release of ETA prisoners.

Beitialarrangoitia then joined EITB, the Basque public broadcaster, where she worked as an announcer on a morning show on the Euskadi Irratia radio station. She contested the 2007 local elections as a Basque Nationalist Action (Eusko Abertzale Ekintza, EAE) candidate in Hernani and was elected. She was mayor of Hernani from 2007 to 2011.

On 12 January 2008, at an EAE rally in Pamplona, Beitialarrangoitia requested applause for ETA members Igor Portu and Mattin Sarasola. A few days earlier Portu and Sarasola has been arrested in connection with the 2006 Madrid–Barajas Airport bombing and been tortured by the Civil Guard. In June 2009 the Audiencia Nacional convicted Beitialarrangoitia of "supporting terrorism" and sentenced her to one year in prison and barred her from holding public office for seven years. She was acquitted of the more serious crime of insulting the security forces by accusing the Civil Guard of torture. Beitialarrangoitia appealed to the Supreme Court who overturned the guilty verdict in March 2010. In December 2010 four Civil Guard officers - Juan Jesús Casas, José Manuel Escamilla, Sergio García and Sergio Martínez - were convicted of torturing Portu and Sarasola.

The EAE was banned in 2008 for being the successor of Batasuna but as the ban wasn't retroactive Beitialarrangoitia continued to hold office. In 2008 Garzón investigated Beitialarrangoitia for continuing EAE's activities. She was also accused of "exalting terrorism" after naming a park in Hernani after Jose Ariztimuño but judge Fernando Grande-Marlaska acquitted her of the charge after she agreed to rename the park. She played a key role in the formation of the Amaiur and Bildu electoral alliances. She did not seek re-election at the 2011 local elections. She was communication director for the Gipuzkoa Provincial Council from 2011 to 2012.

Beitialarrangoitia is a member of Sortu and in January 2017 she was elected to the party's national council. She contested the 2012 regional election as an EH Bildu electoral alliance candidate in the Province of Gipuzkoa and was elected to the Basque Parliament. She contested the 2015 general election as an EH Bildu candidate in the Province of Gipuzkoa and was elected to the Congress of Deputies. She was re-elected at the 2016 general election.

== Electoral history ==
Electoral history of Marian Beitialarrangoitia
Election	Constituency	Party	Alliance	No.	Result
2007 local	Hernani	Basque Nationalist Action		1	Elected
2012 regional	Province of Gipuzkoa	Sortu	EH Bildu	3	Elected
2015 general	Province of Gipuzkoa	Sortu	EH Bildu	1	Elected
2016 general	Province of Gipuzkoa	Sortu	EH Bildu	1	Elected
