= Water service contract =

A water service contract is a contract between the owner of water supply resources or facilities (generally a government body, such as a national state or a municipality) and a water services provider (which may be either a public or a private company).

== United States ==
In the United States, a water service contract is a type of contract, authorized by the Reclamation Project Act of 1939, whereby water is furnished for irrigation or municipal or miscellaneous purposes at rates to produce revenue sufficient to cover charges reimbursable to the federal government.
