= Bush Six =

Group of former United States government officials

The Bush Six are six former officials of the United States government under the presidency of George W. Bush (2001–09) against whom criminal charges were filed in Spain in 2009 by Baltasar Garzón. After appeal of lower court ruling that proceedings could move forward, Spain's National Court dismissed the case for lack of jurisdiction. In closing the investigation, Judge José de la Mata applied reforms to the universal jurisdiction law introduced by the then-Conservative government which imposed new limits on the jurisdiction of Spanish courts that require that cases involve suspects who are Spanish citizens or are living in Spain.

== History ==
In March 2009, Baltasar Garzón was asked to consider whether Spain should allow charges to be filed against:

- Alberto Gonzales, former White House Counsel and US Attorney General;
- David Addington, former Chief of Staff to the Vice President of the United States (under Dick Cheney).
- Jay Bybee, head of the Office of Legal Counsel, Department of Justice (2001 March 2003); also at the Justice Department's Office of Legal Counsel; appointed to the United States Court of Appeals for the Ninth Circuit in 2003, retired from active service in 2019;
- John Yoo, deputy Assistant of Attorney General of the Office of Legal Counsel (2001–2003);
- Douglas Feith, former undersecretary of Defense for policy; and
- William Haynes II, former general counsel for the Department of Defense (chief counsel for Donald Rumsfeld, Secretary of Defense)

Jane Mayer, writing in The New Yorker, reported that Philippe Sands had predicted that charges would be laid against the six men back in his 2008 book Torture Team. Mayer reported that after hearing news of the Spanish charges, Sands told her, "This is the end of these people’s professional reputations! This is no joke. We’re talking about the serious potential deprivation of liberty."

Scott Horton, writing in The Daily Beast, reported on April 13, 2009 that his sources said formal charges would be filed on April 14, 2009. Horton reported that Garzón had been urged to allow another judge, Ismail Moreno, to conduct the case, because he was still involved in the possible prosecution of Spanish former Guantanamo captives. Paul Havens, reporting for the Associated Press reported that an unnamed source within the Spanish prosecutors office had told him that the charges would be filed during the week of April 14, 2009. CNN, also quoting an unnamed source within the Spanish prosecutor's office, reported that charges were not expected for several days.

== Spanish Attorney General drops the charges ==
On April 16, 2009, the Spanish Attorney General, Cándido Conde-Pumpido stated he thought the Spanish investigative magistrate should drop the consideration of charges against the six men. On April 17, 2009, Conde-Pumpido, said his office would not support Judge Garzon's effort to prosecute six Bush administration officials for their role in the US antiterror effort. Conde-Pumpido believes that an American tribunal should judge the case (or dismiss it) before a Spanish Court ever thinks about becoming involved. Mr. Conde-Pumpido told reporters that Garzon's plan threatened to turn the court “into a toy in the hands of people who are trying to do a political action.”

Under the Spanish justice system, investigating magistrates like Garzón are not under the authority of the Attorney General, and he can continue to consider laying charges even though the Attorney General has advised against it. On April 23, 2009, Eloy Velasco took over responsibility for determining whether or not the six former Bush officials should face Spanish charges.

The Guardian reported on April 29, 2009, that Garzón initiated a formal investigation into whether confessions from four former Guantanamo captives was the result of the use of abusive interrogation techniques. The four men: Hamed Abderrahman Ahmed, Lahcen Ikassrien, Jamiel Abdul Latif al Banna and Omar Deghayes, had previously faced charges in Spanish courts, based on confessions they made while in US custody. Their charges had been dropped based on their claims that their confessions were false and were the result of abusive interrogation techniques.

On May 5, 2009, Investigating Magistrate Eloy Velasco formally requested the US to indicate whether they were going to conduct a domestic inquiry into the six men's conduct. Spain's principle of universal justice allows third party states to charge non-citizens, and request their extradition, only when their country of citizenship has not conducted its own investigation.

On May 20, 2009, The New York Times reported that some Spanish legislators were proposing a law to strip investigating magistrates of the authority to pursue international human rights cases.

This law, however, would not retroactively put an end to the progress of current cases. It would merely have stopped the initiation of similar cases. According to historian Andy Worthington (writing in the Huffington Post), Spanish newspaper Público had reported that Garzón was proceeding to the next phase of his investigation. In February 2011, Judge Ruz rejected a Spanish prosecutor's effort to stop the investigation.

== U.S. embassy cables ==
Numerous embassy cables leaked by the whistle-blowing website WikiLeaks centered on the progression of the case.

The cable reveals that Chief Prosecutor Javier Zaragoza intended to steer the case away from its assignment to Judge Baltasar Garzón who is well-known for investigating a universal jurisdiction case targeting Chilean dictator Augusto Pinochet and has been an outspoken critic of the Guantanamo Bay detention facility. Garzón publicly stated that former President George W. Bush should be tried for war crimes. Garzón was "forced to give up" the case against the Bush Six to another judge who declined to pursue the investigation. Garzón, however, continued an investigation into torture at Guantanamo Bay and U.S. Officials indicated in a cable they feared he may, "attempt to wring all the publicity he can from the case unless and until he is forced to give it up."

== See also ==
- Lawfare
