= 2011–12 Al-Talaba SC season =

Al Talaba
2011–12 season
- Chairman: Alaa Kadhim
- Manager: Jamal Ali
- Ground: Several stadiums
- Iraqi Premier League: 2nd
- Top goalscorer: League: Hikmat Irzayij (5); All: Hikmat Irzayij (5)
Home colours	Away colours

In the 2011-12 season, Al Talaba will be competing in the Iraqi Premier League.

== Squad ==
Note: Flags indicate national team as defined under FIFA eligibility rules; some limited exceptions apply. Players may hold more than one non-FIFA nationality.

No.	Pos.	Nation	Player
3	DF	(Iraq) IRQ	Majid Hamid
4	DF	(Iraq) IRQ	Ahmad Abdul-Majid
7	MF	(Iraq) IRQ	Jasem Muhammed
9	FW	(Iraq) IRQ	Karim Walem
11	FW	(Iraq) IRQ	Hassan Jabbar
13	DF	(Iraq) IRQ	Ayad Khalaf
14	MF	(Iraq) IRQ	Nawaf Sallal
15	MF	(Iraq) IRQ	Abbas Rehema
17	MF	(Iraq) IRQ	Ahmed Jabbar
19	MF	(Iraq) IRQ	Ahmed Yahia Alwan
20	MF	(Iraq) IRQ	Eihab Kadhum
21	GK	(Iraq) IRQ	Ahmed Abdul Karim
25	MF	(Iraq) IRQ	Aqeel Abbas
27	GK	(Iraq) IRQ	Osama Hussein

No.	Pos.	Nation	Player
28	MF	(Iraq) IRQ	Sajjad Muhammed
29	MF	(Iraq) IRQ	Abbas Qasem
31	DF	(Iraq) IRQ	Umer Ateiah
32	FW	(Iraq) IRQ	Muhammed Jaleel
50	MF	(Iraq) IRQ	Abdul-Wahab Abu Al-Hail
—	GK	(Iraq) IRQ	Dhiyaa Jabbar
—	GK	(Iraq) IRQ	Mohammed Gassid
—	DF	(Iraq) IRQ	Haidar Abdul-Amir
—	MF	(Iraq) IRQ	Abdullah Dombi
—	MF	(Iraq) IRQ	Muhammed Faisel
—	MF	(Iraq) IRQ	Thamer Foaad
—	FW	(Iraq) IRQ	Ali Khudhair
—	FW	(Iraq) IRQ	Younis Shakur
—	FW	(Iraq) IRQ	Hikmat Irzayij

== Transfers ==
=== In ===
Date	Pos.	Name	From	Fee
August 2011	DF	(Iraq) Bassim Abbas	(Iraq) Konyaspor	-
September 2011	MF	(Iraq) Mohammed Faisel	(Iraq) Baghdad FC	-
September 2011	FW	(Iraq) Akram Hashem	(Iraq) Al-Quwa Al-Jawiya	-
September 2011	FW	(Iraq) Ali Khudhair	(Iraq) Arbil FC	-
October 2011	MF	(Iraq) Thamer Foaad	(Iraq) Najaf FC	-
October 2011	FW	(Iraq) Hikmat Irzayij	(Iraq) Al-Masafi FC	-
October 2011	DF	(Iraq) Haidar Abdul-Amir	(Iraq) Arbil FC	-
October 2011	FW	(Iraq) Younis Shakur	(Iraq) Baghdad FC	-
October 2011	GK	(Iraq) Mohammed Kassid	(Iraq) Arbil FC	-
October 2011	GK	(Iraq) Dhiyaa Jabbar	(Iraq) Duhok FC	-

=== Out ===
Date	Pos.	Name	To	Fee
August 2011	MF	(Iraq) Said Mohsen	(Iraq) Zakho FC	-
August 2011	DF	(Iraq) Salam Muhsen	(Iraq) Baghdad FC	-
September 2011	DF	(Iraq) Haidar Aboodi	(Iraq) Najaf FC	-
September 2011	FW	(Iraq) Salar Abdul Jabbar	(Iraq) Najaf FC	-
September 2011	FW	(Iraq) Aqeel Mohammed	(Iraq) Zakho FC	-
September 2011	GK	(Iraq) Ali Mutashar	(Iraq) Al Shorta	-
October 2011	MF	(Iraq) Thamer Foaad	(Iraq) Najaf FC	-
October 2011	FW	(Iraq) Hassan Jabbar	(Iraq) Al-Naft	-
October 2011	DF	(Iraq) Bassim Abbas	(Iraq) Baghdad FC	-
October 2011	MF	(Iraq) Haidar Abdul-Qader	(Iraq) Al Karkh	-
December 2011	FW	(Iraq) Abdul-Salam Abood	(Iraq) Najaf FC	-
December 2011	MF	(Iraq) Kadhum Dheiaa	(Iraq) Al Shorta	-

== Matches ==
=== Competitive ===
==== Iraqi Premier League ====
5 November 2011 1	Al Talaba	3 – 2	Al Kahraba	Baghdad
12:00 GMT	Hikmat Irzayij 24'; Younis Shakur 34'; Abbas Rehema 64'		Mustafa Husain 48'; Abbas Abdul Razak 69'	Stadium: Al-Quwa Al-Jawiya Stadium

29 October 2011 2	Arbil FC	2 – 1	Al Talaba	Arbil
12:00 GMT	Mahdi Karim 22'; Louay Salah 62'		Muhammed Faisel 26'	Stadium: Franso Hariri Stadium

17 November 2011 3	Al-Quwa Al-Jawiya	0 – 2	Al Talaba	Baghdad
13:30 GMT			Jasem Muhammed 56'; Akram Hashem 58'	Stadium: Al-Shaab Stadium

24 November 2011 4	Al Talaba	2 – 1	Al Zawraa	Baghdad
14:00 GMT	Hikmat Irzayij 85', 88'		Sajjad Hussein 71'	Stadium: Al Shaab Stadium

30 November 2011 5	Karbala FC	0 – 3	Al Talaba	Karbala
11:30 GMT			Hikmat Irzayij 6'; Jasem Muhammed 10'; Akram Hashem 40'	Stadium: Karbala Stadium

4 December 2011 6	Al Talaba	1 – 2	Al Minaa	Baghdad
13:30 GMT	Hikmat Irzayij 37'		Anas Jasem 44'; Ammar AbdulHusain 52'	Stadium: Al Shaab Stadium

14 December 2011 7	Al Taji FC	1 – 2	Al Talaba	Baghdad
11:30 GMT	Basem Muhammed 18'		Haidar Abdul-Amir 42'; Younis Shakur 61'	Stadium: Al Taji Stadium

19 December 2011 8	Al Talaba	2 – 0	Al-Hedood	Baghdad
11:30 GMT	Majeid Hamied 12'; Akram Hashem 32'			Stadium: Al Karkh Stadium

24 December 2011 9	Al Talaba	2 – 0	Kirkuk FC	Baghdad
11:30 GMT	Younis Shakur 54'; Akram Hashem 77'			Stadium: Al Karkh Stadium

30 December 2011 10	Dohuk FC	0 – 1	Al Talaba	Dohuk
11:30 GMT			Muhammed Faisel 20'	Stadium: Duhok Stadium

4 January 2012 11	Al Talaba	0 – 2	Al Karkh	Baghdad
11:30 GMT			Jawad Kazem 35'; Ahmed Abbas 53'	Stadium: Al Naft Stadium

19 January 2012 12	Al Talaba	2 – 1	Zakho	Baghdad
11:30 GMT	Karim Walem 2'; Nawaf Sallal 52'		Amir Sabah 94'	Stadium: Al-Quwa Al-Jawiya Stadium

27 January 2012 13	Najaf	3 – 1	Al Talaba	Najaf
11:30 GMT	Dheiaa Faleh 7'; Samer Saeed 44'; Salih Sadeer 88'		Muhammed Faisel 26'	Stadium: An Najaf Stadium

2 February 2012 14	Al Sinaa	0 – 1	Al Talaba	Baghdad
11:30 GMT			Abbas Rehema 10'	Stadium: Al Sina'a Stadium

8 February 2012 15	Al Talaba	0 – 1	Al-Naft	Baghdad
11:30 GMT			Mushtaq Kadhum 23'	Stadium: Al Naft Stadium

13 February 2012 16	Al-Masafi	0 – 1	Al Talaba	Baghdad
11:30 GMT			Nabil Abedel Kathem 2'	Stadium: Al Naft Stadium

25 February 2012 17	Al Talaba	2 – 1	Al Shorta	Baghdad
13:30 GMT	Eihab Kadhum 54'; Thamer Foaad 65'		Husam Ibrahim 41'	Stadium: Al Shaab Stadium
