= Púnica affair =

Anti-corruption case

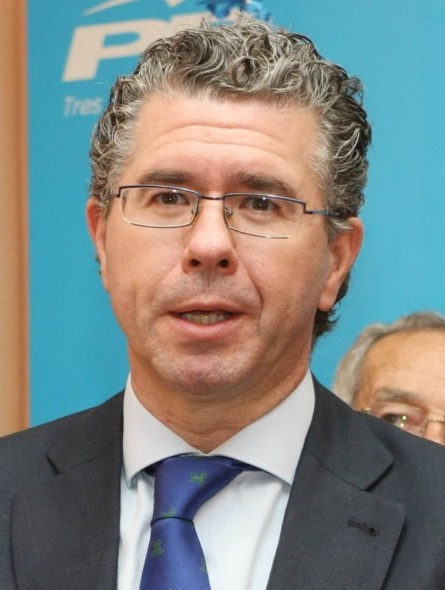
Francisco Granados

Púnica affair (Spanish: Caso Punica), also known as Operation Púnica, is the name given to the police operation carried out by the Central Operational Unit (UCO) of the Guardia Civil, at the request of the judge of the Spanish National Court, Eloy Velasco.

On 27 October 2014, 51 politicians, councillors, civil servants and businessmen were arrested by the Guardia Civil for allegedly being involved in a corruption scheme that awarded public services worth 250 million euros over two years. In return, illegal commissions were allegedly charged - 2-3% of the volume of the contract which were subsequently laundered through a corporate scheme.

Francisco Granados, former number two of the PP in the Community of Madrid behind Esperanza Aguirre, was one of the main people involved, in addition to indirectly giving his name to the operation.

== History ==
According to the Anti-Corruption Prosecutor's Office, this is a "web of municipal and regional corruption infiltrated in various town halls and regional bodies, mainly in the province and autonomous communities of Madrid, Murcia, León and Valencia".

The name "Operación Púnica", given to the operation by the Guardia Civil, comes from the scientific name of the pomegranate tree, Punica granatum, thus making a veiled reference to Francisco Granados.

Among those arrested is Francisco Granados himself, apparently the number one in the plot and secretary general of the PP in Madrid between 2004 and 2011, a former senator, and who held the posts of Minister of the Presidency, Justice and the Interior and Transport of the Community of Madrid, six mayors of the Community of Madrid (those of Parla, Valdemoro, Torrejón de Velasco, Casarrubuelos, Collado Villalba and Serranillos del Valle), the secretary of the Institute of Tourism of the Region of Murcia, the former mayor of Cartagena, José Antonio Alonso and the president of the Provincial Council of León, Marcos Martínez Barazón. In addition, several businessmen, who were supposed to be the architects, were arrested and several headquarters of registered companies. Among the companies involved in the alleged network is Cofely, a subsidiary of the French multinational GDF Suez, with 160 of the 250 million euros rigged. After the arrest on 28 October of José Martínez Nicolás, CEO of the Agencia de Informática y Comunicaciones de la Comunidad de Madrid, the name of the company Indra also appeared as one of the possible beneficiaries.

== Politicians involved ==
On 27 October 2014, 35 people were arrested, of whom 15 remained under investigation.

On October 31, 2014, the judge decreed that Francisco Granados be admitted to prison, a decision that was confirmed by the Audiencia Nacional a month and a half later when they understood that there was still a risk of escape and destruction of evidence, which could well have happened in that month and a half, as they had plenty of time to do so. The order recalled that Granados is attributed with "being part of a criminal organization dedicated to committing crimes of money laundering, against the Public Treasury, false documents, bribery and influence peddling". The Audiencia Nacional also dismissed the appeal on the alleged illegality of his detention.

On 4 November 2014, Antonio Sánchez Fernández, former mayor of Serranillos del Valle, was discovered by the Guardia Civil taking boxes of documents from the town hall, after being alerted by a local official to the possibility of committing a crime. During the event, Sanchez was being investigated for malfeasance, fraud, bribery and embezzlement. Before the event, he had alleged ill health as a reason for not testifying before the judge.

In October 2017, Francisco Granados' defense filed a brief with the judge asking for an investigation into other charges by the Community of Madrid, such as Ignacio González.

In November 2017, the investigators sent several reports to the Central Court of Instruction number 6 in which they requested to extend the investigation to Eduardo Zaplana as well.

On February 12, 2018, Francisco Granados testified before the judge, prompting controversy over the existence of an alleged past "relationship" between Ignacio Gonzalez and Cristina Cifuentes. Reactions to Granados' words came soon: on February 13, 2018, Ignacio Gonzalez came under investigation in Operation Punic, while on February 15, 2018, Cristina Cifuentes filed a complaint against Granados for alleged slander and libel, which has ultimately failed.

In 2018, the main investigations were focused on clarifying the alleged links of the computer expert Alejandro de Pedro Llorca with political and business personalities, especially in the Cartagena environment.

== Investigation at the Audiencia Nacional ==
In September 2015, Judge Eloy Velasco determined to divide the investigation of the case into 12 pieces.

In April 2019, the court set June 2020 as the deadline for completing the investigation of the case, leaving without effect an extension of 40 months until March 2022 previously set by Judge García-Castellón.

On 2 September 2019, Judge García-Castellón ordered the indictment of Esperanza Aguirre and Cristina Cifuentes, former presidents of the Community of Madrid, in one of the parts of the case (highlighting in the order the "decisive and essential" role that the former is alleged to have played in the illegal financing of the PP). The list of defendants included, among others, Juan José Güemes (former minister of Employment), Manuel Lamela (also a former minister, but mainly involved in his positions at Canal de Isabel II, ICM and Fundescam), Gádor Ongil (former minister of Social Services) and Borja Sarasola (also a former regional minister).
