= Lawrence VanDyke =

American judge (born 1972)

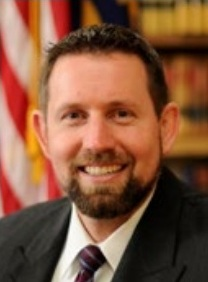

Judge of the United States Court of Appeals for the Ninth Circuit
- Incumbent
- Assumed office January 2, 2020
- Appointed by: Donald Trump
- Preceded by: Jay Bybee

Solicitor General of Nevada
- In office January 5, 2015 – January 7, 2019
- Governor: Brian Sandoval
- Succeeded by: Heidi Stern

Solicitor General of Montana
- In office January 2013 – May 30, 2014
- Governor: Steve Bullock
- Succeeded by: Dale Schowengerdt

Personal details
- Born: Lawrence James Christopher VanDyke; 1972 (age 53–54) Midland, Texas, U.S.
- Education: Oklahoma Christian University (attended); Montana State University (BS, MS); Bear Valley Bible Institute (BTh); Harvard University (JD)

Lawrence James Christopher VanDyke (born 1972) is an American lawyer and jurist serving as a United States circuit judge of the United States Court of Appeals for the Ninth Circuit since 2020. He previously served as the solicitor general of Nevada from 2015 to 2019 and of Montana from 2013 to 2014.

== Early life and education ==
VanDyke was born in 1972 in Midland, Texas, and grew up in Bozeman, Montana. After attending Oklahoma Christian University from 1992 to 1995, he studied civil engineering at Montana State University, graduating in 1997 with a Bachelor of Science with highest honors. He worked for his family's construction company and did graduate study at Montana State for the next three years, receiving a Master of Construction Engineering Management degree in 2000.

VanDyke graduated from Bear Valley Bible Institute, a Bible college in Denver, Colorado, in 2002 with a Bachelor of Theology degree, summa cum laude. He then attended Harvard Law School, where he was an editor of the Harvard Law Review and the Harvard Journal of Law & Public Policy. He graduated in 2005 with a Juris Doctor, magna cum laude.

== Legal career ==
VanDyke worked for the law firm Gibson Dunn from 2005 to 2006, then served as a law clerk to judge Janice Rogers Brown of the United States Court of Appeals for the District of Columbia Circuit from 2006 to 2007. He returned to Gibson Dunn from 2007 to 2012. While in private practice, VanDyke performed pro bono legal work for groups including the American Civil Liberties Union, the Free Market Foundation, and the Alliance Defending Freedom. In 2010, VanDyke filed an amicus brief in the Supreme Court case Christian Legal Society v. Martinez on behalf of the organization Gays and Lesbians for Individual Liberty, in which he argued that a college student group had a First Amendment right to exclude from membership students whose sexual conduct violated the group's stated beliefs.

From 2012 to 2013, VanDyke was an assistant to the Solicitor General of Texas. He was then appointed Solicitor General of Montana but resigned in 2014, citing strain in the workplace. In that role, he submitted numerous amicus briefs filed in other states. He recommended signing on to other states' challenges to state and federal gun laws, co-wrote a brief supporting an Arizona law prohibiting abortions after 20 weeks, and recommended that Montana file a brief in a New Mexico case involving a photographer who refused to photograph a lesbian commitment ceremony.

VanDyke unsuccessfully ran for a seat on the Montana Supreme Court in 2014, losing to incumbent Justice Mike Wheat. He then became Solicitor General of Nevada under Attorney General Adam Laxalt in 2015, where he served until 2019 when he became a deputy Assistant Attorney General for the United States Department of Justice Environment and Natural Resources Division.

Since graduating law school, VanDyke has been a member of the Federalist Society.

== Federal judicial service ==
On September 20, 2019, President Donald Trump announced his intent to nominate VanDyke to serve on the United States Court of Appeals for the Ninth Circuit. Nevada Senators Jacky Rosen and Catherine Cortez Masto, both Democrats, announced their opposition in the nomination. He was appointed to the seat being vacated by Judge Jay Bybee, who had previously announced his intention to take senior status on December 31, 2019. Six retired justices of the Montana Supreme Court publicly opposed VanDyke's nomination. VanDyke received a "not qualified" rating from the American Bar Association (ABA). An ABA evaluator conducted 60 anonymous interviews with lawyers, judges, and others who had worked with VanDyke. In unusually personal terms, the ABA sent and later published a letter to the Senate Judiciary Committee criticizing VanDyke asserting that some interviewees described VanDyke as "arrogant, lazy, an ideologue, and lacking in knowledge of the day-to-day practice" of law. The ABA added that "there was a theme that the nominee lacks humility, has an 'entitlement' temperament, does not have an open mind, and does not always have a commitment to being candid and truthful." Finally, the letter raised "concerns about whether Mr. VanDyke would be fair to persons who are part of the LGBTQ community, claiming that "Mr. VanDyke would not say affirmatively that he would be fair to any litigant before him, notably members of the LGBTQ community."

On October 30, 2019, a hearing on VanDyke's nomination before the Senate Judiciary Committee became contentious. Much of the two-hour hearing was focused on VanDyke's record on LGBTQ issues. VanDyke was asked by Senator Josh Hawley (R-MO), "Did you say that you wouldn't be fair to members of the LGBTQ community?" VanDyke broke down in tears, denying the accusation: "I did not say that. I do not believe that. It is a fundamental belief of mine that all people are created in the image of God and they should all be treated with dignity and respect." Senator Patrick Leahy (D-VT) questioned VanDyke about an opinion editorial he wrote in 2004 while a student at Harvard Law claiming that same-sex marriage may be harmful for children on average. VanDyke stated generally that some of his personal views had changed since that time, and added that his ABA evaluator told him that she was in a "hurry" and did not give him the opportunity to fully respond to concerns. The ABA acknowledged that its lead evaluator assigned to VanDyke, Montana attorney Marcia Davenport, had contributed $150 to VanDyke's opponent in a 2014 Montana Supreme Court election.

The ABA's handling of VanDyke was widely denounced by conservative commentators. Writing for National Review, John McCormack asked: "Were VanDyke's comments to the ABA twisted or taken wildly out of context in order to paint him as a bigot? It is hard to believe any judicial nominee would suggest during an interview with the ABA that he might not be 'fair' to all litigants." McCormack asked the ABA for a transcript of the relevant portion of its interview with VanDyke, but the association declined to provide one. Legal scholar Adam White, a former member of the ABA's Administrative Law Section, wrote a Wall Street Journal op-ed arguing that there was "no basis on which to evaluate any of the broad-brush descriptions of Mr. VanDyke. We don't know what basis, if any, his critics have for these judgments, or even who they are. We're expected to take the ABA's disparagement at face value." The Wall Street Journal editorial board also published a critique of the ABA's treatment of VanDyke. Writing in The Atlantic, law professor Josh Blackman suggested that "going forward, when a nominee is rated as unqualified, the transcript should be released, and the recording should be posted publicly online."

On November 21, 2019, VanDyke's nomination was reported out of committee by a 12–10 vote. On December 10, 2019, the United States Senate invoked cloture on his nomination by a 53–40 vote. On December 11, 2019, his nomination was confirmed by a 51–44 vote. He received his judicial commission on January 2, 2020.

== Notable opinions ==
Reports have noted VanDyke's outspoken dissents in a number of cases.

=== McDougall v. County of Ventura ===
In January 2022, VanDyke wrote a majority opinion holding that two California counties had violated the Second Amendment when they shut down gun and ammunition stores in 2020 as nonessential businesses during the COVID-19 pandemic. VanDyke unusually filed a concurrence to his own opinion, predicting that the case would be heard en banc and claiming that "no firearm-related ban or regulation ever ultimately fails" in the Ninth Circuit. He criticized the court's approach to Second Amendment challenges as "exceptionally malleable". In his attached 13-page concurrence, VanDyke asserted that he would rule in favor of the California counties—the opposite conclusion of his own majority opinion for the panel—and explained: "I figure there is no reason why I shouldn’t write an alternative draft opinion that will apply our test in a way more to the liking of the majority of our court. That way I can demonstrate just how easy it is to reach any desired conclusion under our current framework, and the majority of our court can get a jumpstart on calling this case en banc. Sort of a win-win for everyone." He ended the alternate opinion with "You’re welcome."

=== Anita Green v. Miss United States of America ===
In November 2022, VanDyke held in Anita Green v. Miss United States of America that beauty pageant companies may exclude trans women as part of their freedom of speech rights. In this case, he wrote that "it is commonly understood that beauty pageants are generally designed to express the 'ideal vision of American womanhood'."

=== United States v. Idaho ===
On September 28, 2023, VanDyke upheld Idaho's abortion law despite its lack of exceptions for medical emergencies. On November 13, 2023, the Ninth Circuit reversed VanDyke in voting 7–4 en banc to temporarily block the state abortion ban due to its lack of exceptions for medical emergencies. On January 5, 2024, the Supreme Court said that it would take up the case and dissolved the Ninth Circuit's temporary injunction. On June 27, 2024, the Supreme Court dismissed the case on the grounds that its review would be premature, reinstated the injunction, and returned the case to the Ninth Circuit to decide the case on the merits.

=== Duncan v. Bonta ===
Dissent video released by Lawrence VanDyke in relation to Duncan v. Bonta.

In November 2021, an en banc panel of the Ninth Circuit upheld a California law that limited gun magazine capacity to 10 bullets, and VanDyke accused the majority of "distrust[ing] gun owners and think[ing] the Second Amendment is a vestigial organ of their living constitution." He concluded his dissenting opinion by saying that the ruling meant that "at most, you might get to possess one janky handgun and 2.2 rounds of ammunition, and only in your home under lock and key. That's it. That’s ridiculous, and so I must respectfully dissent."

VanDyke later went on to record a video dissent to more easily demonstrate the reasoning for his dissent, with a focus on the insistence of the state that magazines were not an 'arm' protected by the Second Amendment and instead were an 'accessory' due to them being a part of a firearm that could be changed. He argued that that reasoning by the state could be used to effectively ban any 'protected arm' they wished, as the vast majority of the parts that make up any modern firearm could then be classified as an 'accessory' due to the fact that almost every single part can be changed.

=== Olympus Spa v. Armstrong ===
In March 2026, VanDyke issued a dissenting opinion in Olympus Spa v. Armstrong, a Ninth Circuit case regarding the admittance of trans women to a gender-separated Korean spa in Washington. He wrote that the case under examination was about "swinging dicks" and that "woke regulators and complicit judges seem entirely willing, even eager, to ignore the consequences that their Frankenstein social experiments impose on real women and young girls."

VanDyke's opinion drew written rebukes by 29 of the 51 judges on the Ninth Circuit, who asserted that his "crude and vitriolic language" made them "sound like juveniles, not judges, and it undermines public trust in the courts." The Washington Post covered his remarks in a piece on conservative judges who appeared to be bringing attention to themselves and auditioning to President Donald Trump to be appointed to the Supreme Court.

== See also ==
- Donald Trump judicial appointment controversies
- Donald Trump Supreme Court candidates

Legal offices
Preceded by Jay Bybee	Judge of the United States Court of Appeals for the Ninth Circuit; 2020–present	Incumbent
