= Omar Deghayes =

Libyan citizen

Omar Amer Deghayes عمر عامر الدغيس
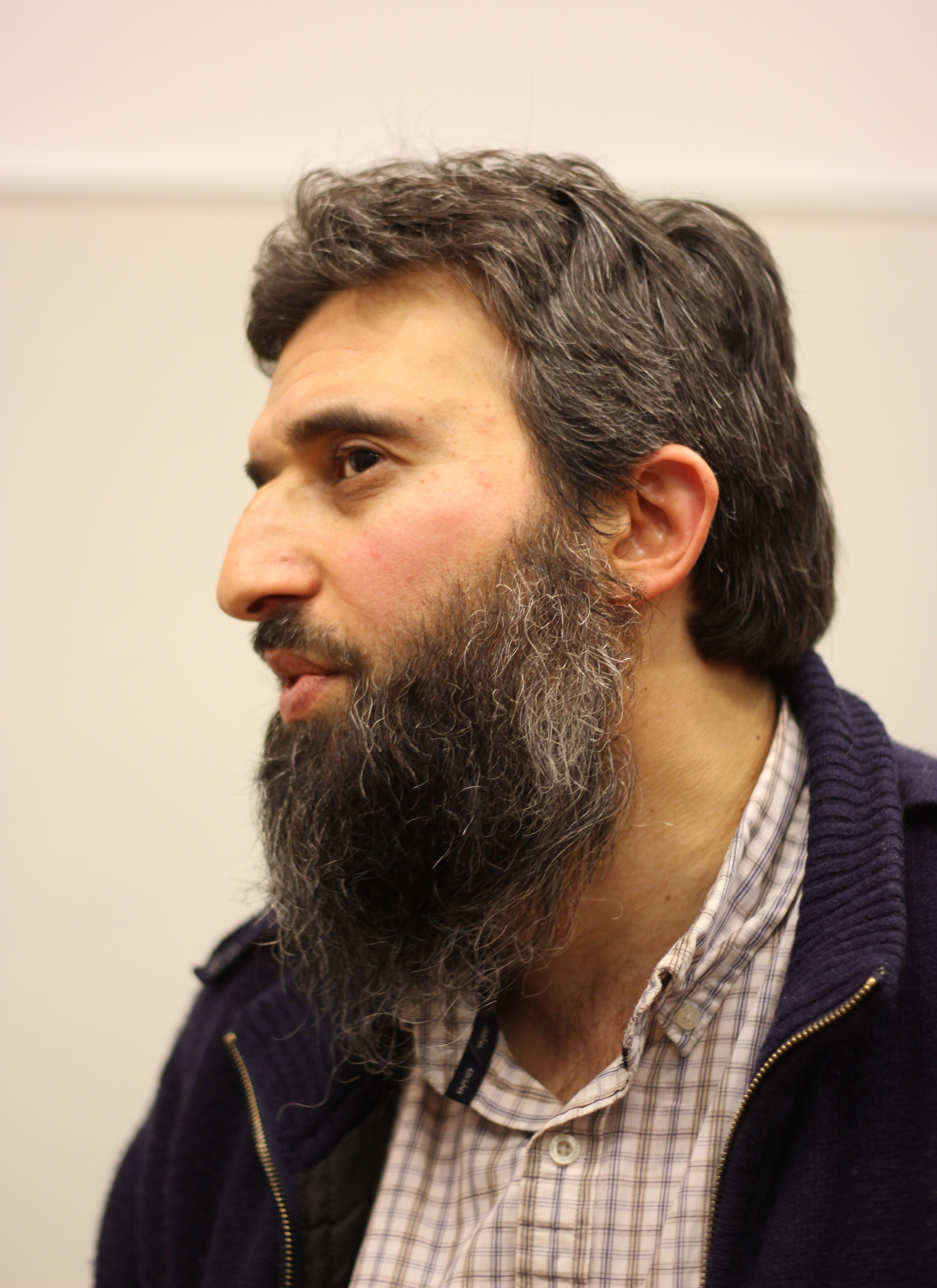
- Omar Deghayes 2012
- Born: 28 November 1969 (age 56); Tripoli, Libya
- Detained at: Lahore, Islamabad, Bagram, Guantanamo
- ISN: 727
- Charge: no charge (extrajudicial detention)
- Status: repatriated to the United Kingdom
- Occupation: lawyer

Omar Amer Deghayes (born 28 November 1969) (Arabic: عمر عامر الدغيس) is a Libyan citizen who had legal residency status with surviving members of his family in the United Kingdom since childhood. He was arrested in Pakistan in 2002. He was held by the United States as an enemy combatant at Guantanamo Bay detention camp from 2002 until 18 December 2007. He was released without charges and returned to Britain, where he lives. His Guantanamo Internment Serial Number was 727. Deghayes says he was blinded permanently in one eye, after a guard at Guantanamo gouged his eyes with his fingers. Deghayes was never charged with any crime at Guantanamo.

When Deghayes was a child, his father, a prominent attorney and union organiser, was arrested and executed by Muammar Gaddafi's government in Libya. His mother took him and his siblings to the United Kingdom, where they had often visited for extended stays, and gained asylum as refugees. They lived in Brighton. According to the Birmingham Post, Deghayes was a "laws graduate"; he studied law at the University of Wolverhampton and later studied in Huddersfield.

During Deghayes's detention at Guantanamo, his family in Great Britain mounted a campaign to free him, which received the support of the Brighton Argus newspaper and all six Members of Parliament in Sussex, where Omar Deghayes had resided for many years. This is where his family still lives. In 2006, the British High Court considered whether the United Kingdom government should petition the United States government on behalf of Guantánamo detainees who had legal British residency status. (It had already petitioned on behalf of British citizens.) The High Court concluded that it did not have the authority to make recommendation in the area of foreign affairs, but said that the evidence that the British residents were being tortured was "powerful".

In August 2007, the British government under Gordon Brown requested Deghayes's release. He was released on 18 December 2007 and returned to Britain. Deghayes and another former detainee were arrested under a Spanish warrant on allegations of al-Qaeda involvement in 2003; he was released on bail while his case is considered.

== Early life and education ==
Omar Deghayes was born in Tripoli, Libya in 1969. His father was an attorney and a prominent figure in Libya, but got at cross purposes with Muammar Gaddafi. After his father was killed by the Libyan government in 1980, al-Walid's family was eventually able to leave in two groups, in 1985 and 1986. His mother's request for asylum in Britain was granted in 1987. Deghayes grew up in a secular household and was granted status as a legal resident. As a college student, while studying at University of Wolverhampton and later in Huddersfield, he began to explore Islam. His mother and sister became British citizens. Deghayes became an attorney. As a young man, he started working in Afghanistan, where he worked on NGOs, efforts at education and rural development.

== Marriage and family ==
After living in Afghanistan for some time, he married an Afghan woman and they had a child together. After his long imprisonment at Guantanamo Bay detention camp, they divorced. Since his return to Britain in December 2007, Deghayes has remarried.

Deghayes had three nephews fighting for Al Qaeda's al-Nusra Front in the Syrian Civil War: Amer Deghayes (20), Abdullah (18) and Jaffar (then 16). Abdullah was killed in 2014, with Amer wounded in the same battle. Jaffar was killed six months later at the age of 17.

== Disruption of war ==
After the United States invasion of Afghanistan in the fall of 2001, Deghayes moved temporarily to Pakistan for what he thought would be safety with his Afghan wife and child. He has said that he was arrested, along with his family, by bounty hunters in Pakistan. He was "sold" to the American forces and taken into military custody. He was first held and interrogated at the Bagram Theater Internment Facility. His wife and child were later released.

His attorney Clive Stafford Smith said that in 2005 an investigation by BBC Newsnight discovered that, shortly before Deghayes's arrest, an anonymous informant had mistakenly identified him to Spanish authorities as appearing in a videotape including Arab mujahideen among rebels in Chechnya. They issued a warrant for his arrest and notified the Americans, who later took him into custody in Pakistan. (The person in the videotape was later correctly identified as Abu al-Walid, an insurgent leader who was killed in Chechnya by Russians in April 2004.) Stafford Smith has said of the mis-identification: "This was typical of the whole Guantánamo experience. They said they had evidence and they wouldn't let you see it. Then when you did, it was incorrect."

Along with other prisoners, Deghayes was transported in 2002 to the recently constructed Guantanamo Bay detention camp and held as a suspected enemy combatant. In 2005, he claimed that Guantanamo guards held him down and sprayed pepper spray directly into his eyes. Deghayes claimed a guard gouged his eyes. He was left permanently blind in his right eye. The DOD declined to comment on specific abuse claims. However, DOD spokesman Lieutenant Commander Alvin "Flex" Plexico repeated his counter-claim that al Qaeda training manuals instruct al Qaeda members to lie about abuse, if captured, to trigger international outrage. He described Guantanamo as "...a safe, humane and professional detention operation..."

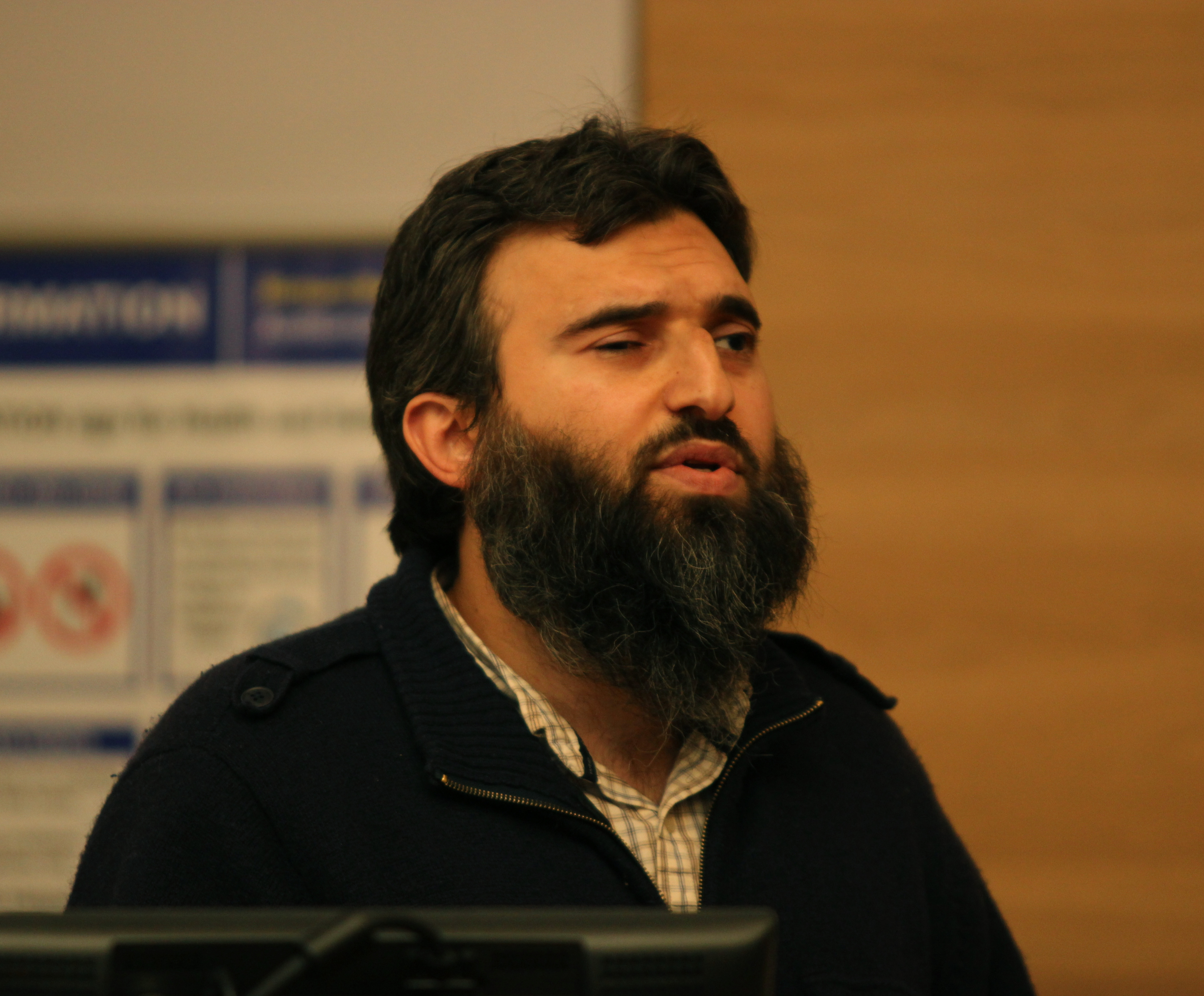
Omar Deghayes 2012

On 10 August 2007, family members released a detailed dossier listing the torture and humiliation that Deghaye claimed that he and other detainees were subjected to while in U.S. custody. The material was reported by numerous media.

Deghayes reported that he:

- Saw a soldier shoot a captive.
- Witnessed the partial drowning of captives (a technique later known as waterboarding).
- Saw a guard throw a Koran into a toilet.
- Saw a Moroccan/Italian named Abdulmalik beaten to death.
- Saw another captive beaten until blood was all over the floor; the detainee was left permanently brain damaged.
- Was permanently blinded when a guard stuck his finger in his eye.
- Had excrement smeared on his face.
- Suffered sexual abuse, which he said was too traumatic to be described in detail.
- Was subjected to electric shocks.
- Was kept naked in the freezing cold and had freezing water thrown on him.
- Was starved for forty-five days.
- Received repeated death threats.

== Mistaken identification from videotape ==
Part of the stated case against Deghayes was that an anonymous informant had told Spanish analysts that he was one of the individuals in a Chechnyan rebel video tape. Spain had passed on this information to the United States shortly before Deghayes was taken to Guantanamo. An inquiry by BBC Newsnight in 2005 found that Deghayes was not on the tape. The team consulted with Professor Tim Valentine of Goldsmiths College, a facial recognition expert, who said that the face in the videotape could not possibly be that of Deghayes. For one thing, it lacked clearly identifiable marks which he carries left by a childhood injury. In August 2007, Stafford Smith said that the face in the videotape was eventually identified as a Saudi Arabian foreign mujahideen leader in Chechnya named Abu al-Walid. Commander of a resistance group, he was killed by Russians in April 2004. Stafford Smith said the face of al-Walid looked more like Fidel Castro than it resembled Deghayes.

== Hunger strikes ==
In September 2005, Deghayes was among the numerous hunger strikers, a protest that was reported as having started over the beating of the detainee Hisham Sliti.

According to an article by his attorney Clive Stafford Smith, Deghayes wrote:

I am slowly dying in this solitary prison cell, I have no rights, no hope. So why not take my destiny into my own hands, and die for a principle?

== Combatant Status Review Tribunal ==
Initially the Bush Presidency asserted that they could withhold all the protections of the Geneva Conventions to captives from the war on terror. This policy was challenged and the United States Supreme Court heard a habeas corpus petition; it ruled in Rasul v. Bush (2004) that detainees had a right to an impartial forum to challenge their detention. It said that the US government had an obligation to conduct competent tribunals to determine the status of each detainee and whether he was or was not entitled to the protections of prisoner of war status. Within weeks, the Department of Defense (DOD) created and implemented the Combatant Status Review Tribunals, which it intended to replace habeas corpus hearings in federal courts. The Tribunals were empowered simply to determine whether the captive had previously been correctly classified under the Bush administration's definition of an enemy combatant.

=== Summary of Evidence memo ===
A Summary of Evidence memo was prepared for each CSRT. Omar Amer Deghayes's Combatant Status Review Tribunal, held on 27 September 2004, included the following allegations:

The detainee is a member of al Qaida and associated with the Taliban.

1. The detainee traveled to Afghanistan with a fake passport.
2. The detainee stayed at the guesthouse of a senior al Qaeda leader.
3. The detainee is a member of the Libyan Islamic Fighting Group (LIFG).
4. The Libyan Islamic Fighting Group (LIFG) is a terrorist organization.
5. The detainee was filmed in an Islamic extremist training video.

== Administrative Review Board hearing ==
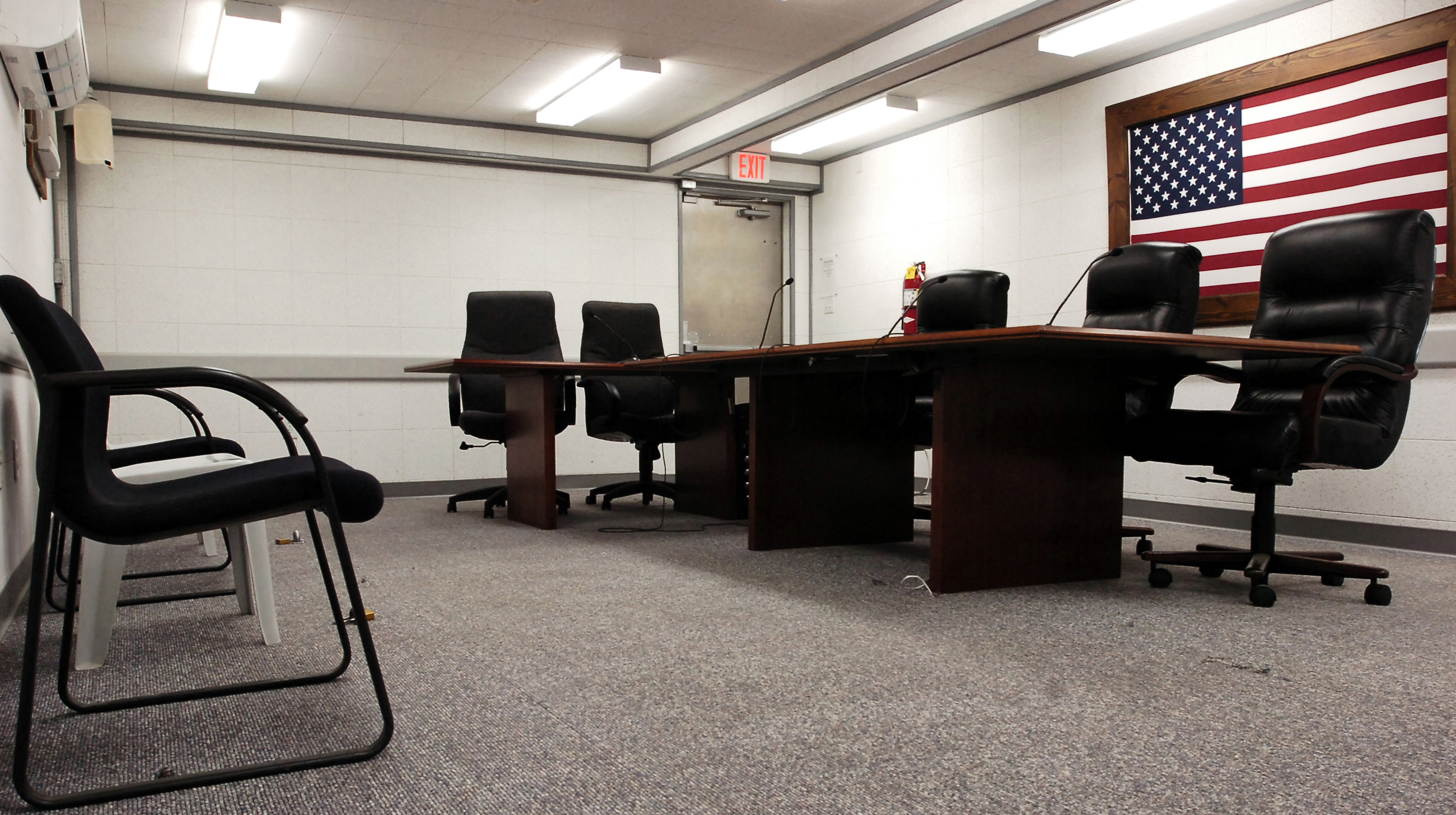
Hearing room where Guantanamo captive's annual Administrative Review Board hearings convened for captives whose CSRT had determined they were an "enemy combatant".

Detainees found to be "enemy combatants" were scheduled to have their dossier reviewed at annual Administrative Review Board hearings. The Administrative Review Boards were to determine whether a detainee should continue to be detained by the United States, because they continued to pose a threat, be repatriated to the custody of their home country, or set free.

=== First annual Administrative Review Board ===
A Summary of Evidence memo was prepared for Deghayes's first annual Administrative Review Board, on 24 May 2005.

"The following primary factors favor continued detention:"

a. Commitment

1. In 1999, the detainee left England for Afghanistan in order to live in an Islamic society under Sharia law.
2. The detainee is a member of the Libyan Islamic Fighting Group (LIFG).
3. LIFG is identified as a terrorist organization in the Terrorist Organization Reference Guide.
4. The detainee is suspected of appearing in a confiscated Islamic extremist military training video showing atrocities in Chechnya.
5. The detainee went to Bosnia to join the mujahideen. The detainee enjoyed his experience in Bosnia and believed it was a good Muslim cause.
6. Detainee's travel from Pakistan to Afghanistan was facilitated by a senior al Qaida Lieutenant.

b. Training

1. The detainee received small arms training during secondary school in Libya.
2. The detainee received training at the Khaldan Camp after arriving in Afghanistan and then joined the fighters in 1999.

c. Connections/Associations

1. The detainee traveled to Afghanistan with a false passport.
2. The detainee stayed at the guesthouse of a senior al Qaida leader.
3. The detainee had a good relationship with Usama Bin Ladin.
4. The detainee was the financial supervisor for operations at the Sanibel organization in Kabul, Afghanistan.
5. Sanibel is identified in Executive Order 13224 as an organization that supports terrorism.
6. The detainee was connected with senior LIFG operatives.

d. Other Relevant Data

1. The detainee said his views of Islam are similar to that of the Taliban.
2. The detainee received two months of solitary confinement as punishment for assaulting a soldier at Guantanamo Bay, Cuba.
3. The detainee was arrested by Pakistani authorities in Lahore, Pakistan on charges that he was al Qaida before being turned over to United States authorities.

The following primary factors favor release or transfer

a. The detainee stated he could not be in the extremist training video because he was never in Chechnya, Russia. b. The detainee claimed to have no knowledge of Usama Bin Ladin or al Qaida. c. The detainee said he never worked for the Taliban while living in Kabul. d. The detainee claimed to have no knowledge of the September 11th attacks or any planned attacks against the United States.

==== Transcript ====
Omar Deghayes's Presiding Officer concluded that he chose not to attend his Administrative Review Board hearing.

=== Second annual Administrative Review Board ===
A Summary of Evidence memo was prepared for Omar Amer Deghayes' second annual Administrative Review Board, on 8 August 2006. The memo listed factors for and against his continued detention.

The following primary factors favor continued detention

a. Commitment

1. The detainee stated that in 1993 he went to Bosnia to join the Mujahedin and stayed in Bosnia for one year at a Mujahedin Army camp.
2. A foreign government service reported transfers of two large sums of money involving the detainee and the Bahamas-based Bank al Taqwa. On 22 December 1994, the detainee and another individual deposited 225,774 United States Dollars into an account at Bank al Taqwa. On 25 May 1996, the amount of US$45,762 from that account was wired to the detainee.
3. Al Taqwa Bank in the Bahamas is listed in Executive Order 13224, which blocks property and prohibits transactions with persons who commit, threaten to commit, or support terrorism.
4. The detainee stated that he traveled to Afghanistan in the summer of 1999 using a fake British passport which he purchased for 1,000 British pounds.
5. The detainee stated that he obtained airline tickets for 800 British pounds from an individual whom the detainee knew was a member of the Libyan Islamic Fighting Group.
6. The detainee stated that he flew from England to Islamabad, Pakistan via Karachi, Pakistan, where he was met by a contact provided by an individual whom the detainee knew was a member of the Libyan Islamic Fighting Group. The detainee stated that he stayed for three days at the contact's home, was driven to Jalalabad, Afghanistan by the contact and then rented a ride to Kabul, Afghanistan.
7. The detainee stated that while in Afghanistan he worked as a financial supervisor at the charity organization Sanibel.
8. A former member of the Libyan Islamic Fighting Group stated that Sanibil characterizes itself as a charitable organization, but Sanibil's first priority was providing support to the jihad activities of the Libyan Islamic Fighting Group.
9. Al-Aqsa Sinabil Establishment is listed in Executive Order 13224, which block property and prohibits transactions with persons who commit, threaten to commit or support terrorism.
10. A senior al Qaida operative stated that the detainee stayed at an al Qaida guest house in Pakistan in 1998.
11. An individual stated that the detainee arrived in Pakistan in approximately 1998, joined the Libyan Islamic Fighting Group upon his arrival, and worked at the al-Sanabil Institution in Kabul, Afghanistan.
12. A detained Libyan Islamic Fighting Group member stated that the detainee used to be a member of the LIbyan Islamic Fighting Group but did not know if the detainee received training.
13. The Libyan Islamic Fighting Group is a foreign terrorist organization. Some members are aligned with al Qaida.
14. An individual stated that the detainee joined the Taliban movement and worked for a short while at the al-Sanabil Institution until the 11 September 2001 attacks.
15. An individual stated that the Ashara guest house was owned by al Qaida and used by al Qaida members from Saudi Arabia, Yemen, Iraq and Libya.

b. Training

1. A senior al Qaida operative stated that he facilitated the detainee's travel to a Libyan camp in Afghanistan.
2. An individual stated that the detainee came to Afghanistan in 1998 and was trained at Samarkhil or Samardil Camp.
3. A detainee of a foreign service stated that a Libyan Islamic Fighting Group camp was opened in the Samarkhil region near Jalalabad, Afghanistan in 1998.
4. The detainee was trained by and received Professional Association of Diving Instruction certification from an individual who has been associated with al Qaida and has provided dive training to jihadists.

c. Other Relevant Data

The detainee stated that when the bombing began in Afghanistan, he was transported by truck with Taliban members from Kabul, Afghanistan to the Peshawar, Pakistan area and was later arrested in Lahore, Pakistan.

The following primary factors favor release or transfer

a. The detainee stated that he did not know the individual who has been associated with al Qaida and has provided dive training to jihadists.

b. The detainee stated that he had no knowledge of Usama bin Laden or al Qaida, had no prior knowledge of the 11 September 2001 attacks and never worked for the Taliban.

c. The detainee stated that he was not connected to any terrorist groups, he did not attend any training camps and he has never engaged in jihad.

d. The detainee stated that he would not accept anyone committing attacks similar to those of 11 September 2001.

e. The detainee stated that he does not agree with the use of suicide bombers and car bombs.

f. The detainee stated that if released he would like to go back to Brighton, England to work in his family's property business which his mother and brother are currently running.

== Release ==
On 7 August 2007, the United Kingdom government requested the release of Omar Deghayes and four other detainees who had been legal British residents prior to their detention. Responding to considerable interest in the case of Deghayes and other men, the UK government warned the public that the negotiations might take months. On 18 December 2007, Deghayes was freed from Guantanamo Bay and flown to the UK.

== Spanish extradition request ==
Deghayes and Jamil El-Banna, another former legal British resident released at the same time, were arrested and questioned by Spanish authorities, before being required to appear in court in response to a Spanish extradition warrant. A third former detainee, Sameur Abdenour, an Algerian national and former legal resident of Britain, was questioned and released that day. Deghayes and El-Banna were accused of being al-Qaeda members in Madrid. Deghayes was freed on bail on 20 December, conditions of which include obeying a curfew and wearing an electronic tag. On 6 March 2008, Spanish judge Baltasar Garzón dropped the extradition request on humanitarian grounds. Garzón based his decision on a medical examination, which he made public on 12 February 2008. The report said Deghayes suffered from: "post-traumatic stress syndrome, severe depression and suicidal tendencies." Garzón ruled the mental health of Deghayes and El-Banna had deteriorated so badly in detention that it would be cruel to prosecute them.

== Torture claims investigation ==
On 29 April 2009, the Spanish investigating magistrate, Baltazar Garzón, initiated a formal investigation into whether confessions from Deghayes and three other former Guantanamo captives were the result of the use of abusive interrogation techniques. By this time, the Obama administration had released legal opinion memos prepared by the Office of Legal Counsel, Department of Justice, under the Bush administration, which have become known as the Torture Memos. Dating from August 2002 through May 2005, these authorized specific enhanced interrogation techniques to be used by the CIA and DOD, which have since legally held to be torture.

Deghayes and the three other men: Hamed Abderrahman Ahmed, Lahcen Ikassrien, and Jamiel Abdul Latif al Banna, had previously faced charges in Spanish courts, based on confessions they made while in US custody. Their charges were dropped in the cases of Deghayes and al Banna, based on Garzón's determination that their mental health had been adversely affected by their detention. In addition, he noted that the men said that their confessions were false and had been coerced as the result of abusive interrogation techniques.

== Current status ==
Deghayes had a lengthy interview with Patrick Barkham, a reporter from The Guardian newspaper, published on January 21, 2010. In it he reviewed his entire experience of arrest and detention.

== Representation in other media ==
- Outside the Law: Stories from Guantanamo (2009), is a documentary featuring interviews with Omar Deghayes.

== See also ==
- Omar Deghayes v. George W. Bush
- Initial Reaction Force
- Detainee abuse
