= Lahcen Ikassrien =

Moroccan Guantanamo Bay detainee

Lahcen Ikassrien is a citizen of Morocco who was held in extrajudicial detention in the United States Guantanamo Bay detainment camps, in Cuba. Ikassrien's Guantanamo ISN was 72. The Department of Defense reports that Ikassrien was born on October 2, 1972, in Targuist, Morocco.

On June 16, 2014, he was arrested in Madrid accused of jihadism. He received a 10 year sentence, on September 30, 2016, after being convicted of recruiting individuals to go to war-torn Syria. Ikassrien alleged that he and other Guantanamo Bay detainees were tortured during their detention, and a Spanish magisterial investigation concluded that they had been subject to abusive interrogation techniques.

== Background ==
When Ikassrien was first captured authorities thought his name was Reswan A. Abdesalam. His real identity was revealed through his fingerprints.

Ikassrien was believed to have ties to Imad Eddin Barakat Yarkas, a mastermind of the Madrid bombing.

On July 18, 2005, Ikassrien was extradited to stand trial in Spain.

The International Herald Tribune reported that Ikassrien was acquitted on October 11, 2006.

=== Official status reviews ===
Originally the Bush Presidency asserted that captives apprehended in the "war on terror" were not covered by the Geneva Conventions, and could be held indefinitely, without charge, and without an open and transparent review of the justifications for their detention. In 2004 the United States Supreme Court ruled, in Rasul v. Bush, that Guantanamo captives were entitled to being informed of the allegations justifying their detention, and were entitled to try to refute them.

=== Office for the Administrative Review of Detained Enemy Combatants ===
Combatant Status Review Tribunals were held in a 3x5 meter trailer where the captive sat with his hands and feet shackled to a bolt in the floor.

Following the Supreme Court's ruling, the Department of Defense set up the Office for the Administrative Review of Detained Enemy Combatants.

== Combatant status review ==
Initially, the Bush administration asserted that they could withhold all the protections of the Geneva Conventions to captives from the war on terror. This policy was challenged before the Judicial branch. Critics argued that the USA could not evade its obligation to conduct competent tribunals to determine whether captives are, or are not, entitled to the protections of prisoner of war status.

Subsequently, the Department of Defense instituted the Combatant Status Review Tribunals. The Tribunals, however, were not authorized to determine whether the captives were lawful combatants—rather they were merely empowered to make a recommendation as to whether the captive had previously been correctly determined to match the Bush administration's definition of an enemy combatant.

=== Allegations ===
The following allegations were presented to his Tribunal:

a. Detainee is associated with al-Qaida and the Taliban.
1. The detainee admits being a member of the Taliban.
2. Detainee was taken to Mazer e-Sharif by Taliban forces.
3. Detainee admits to associating with Yunnus Shokuri and Radwan Shokuri, both members of al-Qaida affiliated terrorist groups.

b. Detainee engaged in hostilities against the US or its coalition partners.
1. Detainee admits purchasing a Kalishnakov [sic] rifle in Kabul in May or June 2001.
2. Detainee was observed on the front line and during the retreat in Afghanistan and at Qala-I Junghi [sic] prison.
3. Detainee was injured during the U.S. bombing of Konduz.
4. Detainee took refuge in an underground hiding area with Taliban forces during the U.S. bombing of Mazar e-Sharif [sic].
5. Detainee was captured by U.S. forces with other Taliban members in Mazar e-Sharif.

=== Transcript ===
There is no record that Lahcen Ikassrien chose to participate in his Combatant Status Review Tribunal.

== Torture ==
On November 19, 2006, El País published an article in which Ikassrien alleges that he had been tortured repeatedly over the course of a month during his detention in Kandahar. He alleges that he was subjected to various forms of torture, including being trapped with aggressive dogs, being tied up, and that soldiers held him in a cage where they showered him with feces and urine while calling him "Animal No. 64".

== Torture claims investigation ==
On April 29, 2009, that Spanish investigating magistrate Baltasar Garzon initiated a formal investigation into whether confessions from Ikassrien, and three other former Guantanamo captives were the result of the use of abusive interrogation techniques. Ikassrien, and the other three men: Hamed Abderrahman Ahmed, Jamiel Abdul Latif al Banna and Omar Deghayes, had previously faced charges in Spanish courts, based on confessions they made while in US custody. Their charges had been dropped based on their claims that their confessions were false and were the result of abusive interrogation techniques.

== See also ==
- The Bush Six
- Torture
- Imran v. Bush
