= Yunis Abdurrahman Shokuri =

Moroccan detainee in Guantanamo (born 1968)

- Ahmad Abdullah al-Wazan's Guantanamo detainee assessment
- Born: May 4, 1968 (age 58); Safi, Morocco
- Released: February 2016; Morocco
- Citizenship: Moroccan
- Detained at: Guantanamo, Moroccan prisons
- Other names: Ahmad Abdullah al Wazan: Younous Chekkouri; Younis Chekkouri; Yunnus Shokuri; Younis Shakur; Yuunis Shokuri
- ISN: 197
- Status: Was held in extrajudicial detention in Guantanamo for over thirteen years

Yunis Abdurrahman Shokuri (Arabic: يونس عبد الرحمن الشقوري) is a citizen of Morocco who was held in extrajudicial detention in the Guantanamo Bay detention camps, in Cuba. The Department of Defense reports his date of birth as May 4, 1968. The Department of Defense reports that he was born in Safi, Morocco.

Shokuri was repatriated to Morocco, in spite of its human rights record, when US State Department officials asserted they had diplomatic assurances that he would not be incarcerated in Morocco, after his return. In fact he was held, without charge, for a further six months. The New York Times reports that, after he was finally free, he denounced the Islamic State and other radical fundamentalist Muslim militants.

== Press reports ==
On July 12, 2006, the magazine Mother Jones provided excerpts from the transcripts of a selection of the Guantanamo detainees.

Shokuri was one of the detainees profiled. According to the article his transcript contained the following comment:

[T]he only way I know the United States is through movies from Hollywood or through cartoons. I'm a big fan of a lot of their singers…. [T]he first time I saw an American soldier was at Kandahar Air Base…. When I first saw myself in Kandahar, it was like I was in a cinema or a movie. I saw a 1996 movie called The Siege. The movie was about terrorists carrying out terrorist attacks in the United States…. [In the movie] the CIA and FBI were not successful in finding that terrorist group and the United States Army interfered and gathered all the people of Arabic descent and put them in a land cage or camp just like it happened in Kandahar. I was shocked, thinking, "Am I in that movie or on a stage in Hollywood?"… Sometimes I laugh at myself and say, "When does that movie end?"

== Inconsistent identification ==
Shokuri was named inconsistently in official Department of Defense documents.

- He was named Yunis Abdurrahman Shokuri in the official list of all captives, released on May 15, 2006.
- He was named Yuunis Shokuri in one of the allegations in the Summary of Evidence memo prepared for Laacin Ikrassin, another Moroccan, which justified his continued detention because he associated with Radwan Shokuri and Yuunis Shokuri.:
- He was named Ahmed Abdullah Al-Wazan on a list published on August 15, 2006.
- He was named Younous Chekkouri on his habeas corpus petition.

== Habeas corpus petition ==
Shokuri had a writ of habeas corpus filed on his behalf.

On July 15, 2008, Jan K. Kitchel filed a "PETITIONER'S REQUEST FOR 30-DAY NOTICE OF REMOVAL OR TRANSFER" on Shokuri's behalf in Civil Action No. CV 05-0329 (HHK).

The petition would prevent the Department of Defense from transferring him out of US jurisdiction without giving his attorney's thirty days notice. The Department of Defense had transferred some captives to countries where they were subsequently subjected to abusive treatment—even though they had active habeas corpus petitions.
