= Baltasar Garzón =

Spanish judge (born 1955)

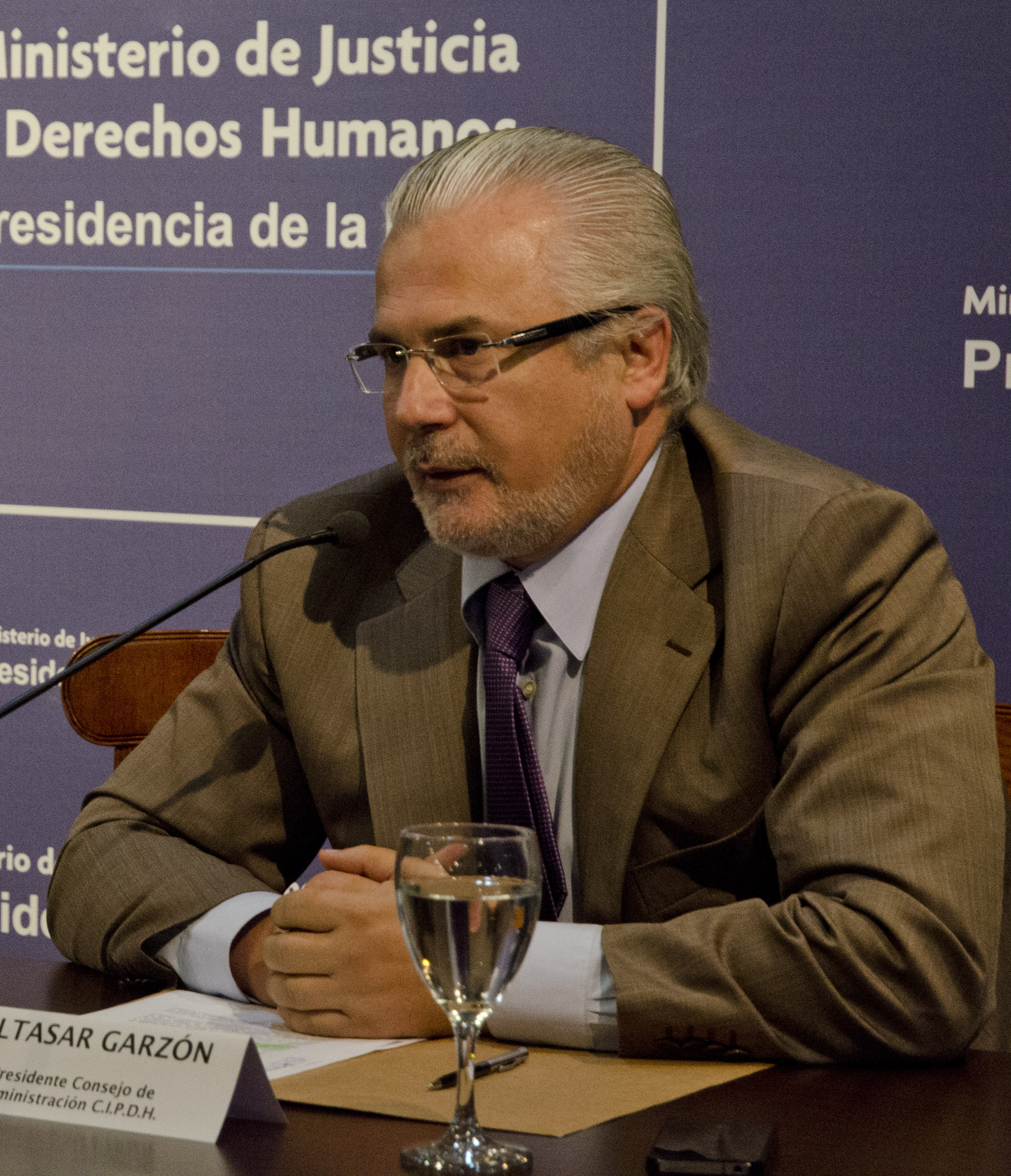
- Garzón in 2014

Investigating Magistrate of the Central Court of Criminal Proceedings Number 5
- In office 1987 – 14 May 2011
- Succeeded by: Pablo Ruz

Member of the Congress of Deputies
- In office 1 July 1993 – 9 May 1994
- Succeeded by: Rafael María García-Rico Fernández
- Constituency: Madrid

Personal details
- Born: Baltasar Garzón Real; 26 October 1955 (age 70) Torres, Jaén, Andalusia, Spain
- Party: Actúa (2017–2023); Independent (1993–1994, linked with PSOE)
- Spouse: María del Rosario Molina Serrano
- Education: University of Seville

Baltasar Garzón Real (Spanish pronunciation: [baltaˈsaɾ ɣaɾˈθon]; born 26 October 1955) is a Spanish former judge in Spain's central criminal court, the Audiencia Nacional, the court responsible for investigation of the most serious criminal cases, including terrorism, organised crime, crimes against humanity, Illegal drug trade, money laundering and state terrorism.

Garzón came to international prominence in 1998 by having former Chilean dictator Augusto Pinochet arrested in London for extradition based on international human rights law. The judge had already become well known in Spain for investigating Basque separatist group ETA and for his probe into government death squads in the 1980s which is thought to have helped to bring down the Socialist government in 1996 elections. In 2005, as a result of Garzón´s indictment of a group of men (including Osama Bin Laden) for their alleged membership of a terrorist group, 24 were put on trial in Europe's biggest trial of alleged al-Qaeda operatives.

In 2009 Garzón made a controversial judgement that the acts of repression committed by the Franco regime were crimes against humanity.

In 2010, Garzón was suspended from judicial activity and in 2012 he was convicted of willful abuse of power and disbarred for a period of 11 years. The trials and conviction were condemned internationally including by the International Commission of Jurists and the United Nations Human Rights Committee on the basis that the case was arbitrary and did not comply with the principles of judicial independence and impartiality and violated the International Covenant on Civil and Political Rights.

After 2012, Garzón has held many positions including as director of the legal defense of Wikileaks founder Julian Assange; as an advisor to the International Criminal Court; in Argentina as director of international advice at the Secretariat of Human Rights of the Ministry of Justice and Human Rights; in Colombia, he advised the Attorney General's Office; and in Ecuador, he was appointed coordinator of the International Oversight Committee on Justice Reform.

Garzón holds honorary doctorates from twenty-two universities around the world and is the recipient of numerous prizes.

== Personal life ==
Born in Torres, Jaén, Garzón graduated from the University of Seville in 1979. He was appointed to the Audiencia Nacional in 1988, and rapidly made his name in Spain by pursuing the Basque separatist group ETA. In December 2023 he married his partner, former Attorney General of Spain Dolores Delgado.

== Political career ==
In 1993, Garzón asked for an extended leave of absence as a judge and went into politics, running for the Congress of Deputies (the lower house of parliament) as an independent candidate on the party list of the then ruling party Partido Socialista Obrero Español (PSOE). Prime Minister Felipe González appointed him head of a strengthened National Plan Against Drugs, but Garzón resigned shortly after being appointed, complaining of lack of support from the government, and returned to the Audiencia Nacional.

== Selected Spanish cases ==
=== Government Death Squads ===
GAL (Spanish: Grupos Antiterroristas de Liberación, "Antiterrorist Liberation Groups") were state terrorist death squads illegally established by officials of the Spanish government during the Basque conflict to fight against ETA, the main Basque separatist militant group. They were active from 1983 to 1987. Garzon's 1994 investigation led to the conviction of José Barrionuevo Peña, a former Interior minister, as head of GAL and specifically, for ordering and financing the kidnap of alleged ETA activist, Segundo Marey.

=== Drug-trafficking ===
Garzón supervised several police operations against drug-trafficking in Galicia from about 1990. Colombian cartels, such as the Medellín Cartel, were using the Galician mafia, already accustomed to smuggling tobacco, to smuggle drugs into Spain. In 1990, Operación Nécora led to the conviction of members of the clan led by Laureano Oubiña. The following year Garzón headed another investigation, Operación Pitón, which led to the conviction of members of the Charlines clan.

=== Caso Atlético ===
In 1999, Garzón investigated Jesús Gil, the former mayor of Marbella and owner of Atlético Madrid, who was convicted in 2002 on grounds of corruption.

=== Ban of Basque parties Batasuna, EAE-ANV and EHAK ===
On 3 September 2002, Garzón accused the Basque party Batasuna of helping and funding ETA, participating in the armed organization, and as such, involved in "crimes against humanity". Police shut down offices and property of the party on Garzon's orders, and suspended for three years the operations of the party. By 2007, 22 party leaders had been arrested.

In February 2009, ahead of the Spanish general election on 9 March 2008, Garzón suspended the Basque parties EAE-ANV and EHAK (PCTV), and ordered the closure of their headquarters, premises, establishments and any other venues, as well as blocking the parties' bank accounts. In April 2008, the judge put on trial 41 members of the party, including Arnaldo Otegi. In September, the Supreme Court of Spain outlawed the parties EAE-ANV and EHAK. In March 2009, Garzón indicted 44 members constituting the leadership of the three parties in an indictment numbering 583 pages. The judge stated that "EAE-ANV and EHAK (PCTV) were manipulated by the members of the national committee of Batasuna to continue the criminal pursuit designed by ETA".

=== Francoist atrocities ===
In October 2008, Garzón formally declared as crimes against humanity the acts of repression committed by the Nationalist government during the Spanish Civil War and the years that followed the war accounting for more than one hundred thousand killings. He also ordered the exhumation of 19 unmarked mass graves, one of them believed to contain the remains of the poet Federico García Lorca. This action was controversial because the offenses were nearly 70 years old, occurring before the concept of crimes against humanity, and a 1977 Amnesty Act which barred investigations into criminal offenses with a political aim prior to 1976.

On 17 November 2008, the inquiry was suspended by Garzón after state prosecutors had questioned his jurisdiction. In a 152-page statement, he passed responsibility to regional courts for opening 19 mass graves believed to hold the remains of hundreds of victims.

=== Bribery of politicians ===
Garzón started a major corruption inquiry, code-named "Gürtel" from the name of its ringleader, Francisco Correa, ("Gürtel" being German for "belt", which is the meaning of "correa" in Spanish). The detainees were accused of bribes given to the People's Party politicians to obtain lucrative government contracts. The accused requested that the evidence be ruled inadmissible, since it was obtained from conversations between prisoners and counsel, which, under Spanish law, it was claimed, is allowed only in terrorism-related cases.

== Selected international cases ==
=== Augusto Pinochet ===
On 10 October 1998, Garzón issued an international warrant for the arrest of former Chilean dictator Augusto Pinochet for the alleged deaths and torture of Spanish citizens. The Chilean Truth Commission (1990–91) report was the basis for the warrant, marking the first full use of the Spanish law principle of universal jurisdiction (which allows suspects in international cases to be tried in Spain, even if there is no immediate connection to the country) to attempt to try a former dictator for a crime committed abroad. This action also had the effect of encouraging the Chilean justice system into action.

Eventually the extradition was turned down by British Home Secretary Jack Straw, who rejected Garzón's request to have Pinochet extradited to Spain on health grounds.

==== Kissinger and Operation Condor ====
Garzón asked for permission to interview former U.S. Secretary of State Henry Kissinger about terrorism and genocide that occurred as part of Operation Condor. Permission was refused.

=== Argentina's Dirty War ===
Garzón also filed charges of genocide and terrorism against Argentine military officers for the disappearance of Spanish citizens during Argentina's 1976–1983 dictatorship's Dirty War. Eventually, Adolfo Scilingo and Miguel Angel Cavallo were prosecuted in separate cases. Cavallo was extradited from Mexico to Spain in 2003 and eventually tried in Argentina. Scilingo was convicted, and sentenced in 2007 to over 1,000 years incarceration for his crimes.

=== Guantanamo ===
Garzón issued indictments for five Guantanamo detainees, including Spaniard Abderrahman Ahmad and Jordanian Jamil El Banna. Ahmad was extradited to Spain on 14 February 2004. El Banna was released to the United Kingdom, and in 2007, Garzón dropped the charges against him on humanitarian grounds.

==== Bush Six ====
In March 2009, Garzón considered whether Spain should allow charges to be filed against former officials from the United States government under George W. Bush for offering justifications for torture. The six former Bush officials are: Alberto Gonzales, former Attorney General John Yoo, of the Office of Legal Counsel; Douglas Feith, former undersecretary of defense for policy; William Haynes II, former general counsel for the Department of Defense; Jay Bybee, also at Justice Department's Office of Legal Counsel; and David Addington, Vice President Dick Cheney's Chief of Staff. However, the investigation was assigned to Judge Eloy Velasco who chose not to pursue it stating that Spain could not investigate the case if the U.S. did not intend to conduct its own investigation into the matter.

On 29 April 2009, Garzón opened an investigation into an alleged "systematic programme" of torture at Guantánamo Bay, following accusations by four former prisoners. Similarly, the leaked cable indicates that the Chief Prosecutor intended to also fight this investigation and that he feared, "Garzón may attempt to wring all the publicity he can from the case unless and until he is forced to give it up."

In September 2009, the Spanish newspaper Público reported that, despite opposition, Garzón was proceeding to the next phase of his investigation.

=== Alex Saab ===
On 22 July 2020, Garzón said that he would represent Colombian businessman Alex Saab in a U.S. extradition case, indicted with money laundering charges.

== Appearance before the Spanish Supreme Court ==
In April 2010 the Supreme Court of Spain admitted three criminal accusations against Garzón for 'prevarication' or willful abuse of power, a criminal offense punishable by suspension from any (Spanish) judicial activity for up to twenty years. The three accusations were: for opening the investigation into Francoist atrocities; for bugging corruption suspects linked to the opposition Popular Party (Caso Gürtel); and for allegedly dropping an investigation into the head of Spain's biggest bank Santander after receiving payments for giving courses sponsored by the bank in New York.

The first indictment originated in September 2009, when a trade union called "Manos limpias" (Clean Hands) filed a criminal complaint to the Supreme Court against Garzón alleging that Garzón had abused his judicial authority by opening the inquiry into Francoist atrocities. Private prosecution (Spanish: acusación particular) is a unique feature of Spanish criminal law that allows a citizen or organisation to participate in prosecuting crimes in the public interest, even if they were not personally harmed, with the aim of reinforcing citizen oversight of public justice. Manos Limpias is a "far-right group," according to The New York Times that had filed seventeen complaints against Garzón since 1997, all of which had been dismissed prior to this one. Garzón denied any wrongdoing.

As a result Garzón was indicted by the Spanish Supreme Court for willful abuse of power for allegedly arbitrarily changing his juridical criteria in order to bypass the law limiting his jurisdiction. Garzón's indictment was highly divisive within Spain and controversial abroad. Amnesty International and Human Rights Watch condemned the indictment, and The New York Times published an editorial supporting him, whereas The Wall Street Journal condemned Garzón's proceedings in an editorial supporting the rule of law. There were public protests in Spain from groups supporting Garzón.

The International Commission of Jurists considered that his short-lived inquiry did not justify disciplinary action, let alone criminal prosecution, adding that the prosecution of judges for carrying out their professional work was "an inappropriate and unwarranted interference with the independence of the judicial process". The United Nations special rapporteur on the independence of judges and lawyers, found the indictment "regrettable". Human Rights Watch called for Spanish authorities to abide by the United Nations call for an end to its 1977 amnesty law rather than prosecuting a judge seeking accountability for past abuses. They also drew attention to the International Covenant on Civil and Political Rights (ICCPR), which Spain ratified in 1977.

In the third indictment the allegation was that Garzón had dropped (adjourned sine die) a case against the director of Santander, Emilio Botín, in return for sponsorship by the bank of some university courses delivered in New York by Garzón between 2005 and 2006. This appeal to the Supreme Court followed a charge previously closed by the Criminal Court on 27 November 2006, since the alleged fee was deemed by the lower court to not be paid to Garzón, but to the university foundation.

Garzón presented an appeal against the judge investigating the cases, Luciano Varela accusing him of partiality in having "a direct interest in the proceedings and bias in the action" and having "worked closely with the plaintiffs by offering counsel or legal advice" intended help the complainants to correct a defect in their series of indictments to meet a deadline. Luciano Varela accepted the appeal and temporarily stepped out from the case until the Supreme Court rules on the appeal.

Judge Varela subsequently determined that Garzon should stand trial and so on Friday, 14 May 2010, Garzón was suspended from judicial activity (with pay) 'as a precaution, pending judgment' as is formally required by Spanish law.

On 17 December 2010, Garzón challenged five of the seven Supreme Court justices that could be appointed to judge him. He alleged that the five judges should be disqualified from officiating in any way because they had participated in pre-trial activities and thus may have an interest in the outcome that might affect their impartiality.

=== Trial ===
On 9 February 2012, the Supreme Court ruled that judge Baltasar Garzón was guilty of illegally ordering the placement of wiretaps in gaols to record conversations between inmates and their lawyers in a case of corruption in Caso Gürtel described above. Under Spanish law, such wiretaps are only expressly permitted for terrorism cases and the legality of their use in other cases is more vague. The Supreme Court also barred Garzón from the legal profession for 11 years. The court said: "Garzón's methods are typical of totalitarian countries, without any respect of the right of defence." Since Garzon cannot appeal the charges, his career as a Spanish judge is likely to have ended. He was also fined €2,500.

People protested the trial and ruling outside the court with banners calling for "justice" and photos of the people said to have been killed by the Franco regime. Many other judges also came out in support of Garzón. It was later revealed that the Supreme Court had made a mistake in sentencing by overlooking the fact the Garzón had already been suspended for nearly a year.

In Spain, there were also statements in support of the ruling. The progressive Judges for Democracy association stated that "The Supreme Court and any other criminal court can only be asked to apply the law and respect the presumption of innocence. This must be both in determining the facts and in interpreting the norm. Whether or not one agrees with the Court's decision and the interpretation on which it is founded, we must state that the Supreme Court has ruled in this context and should not be disqualified as such an institution for it. Margarita Robles, member of the General Council of the Judiciary and former Subsecretary of State with the socialist government, said that the Supreme Court ruling was "legally impeccable" and had been produced as part of a procedure "with all the guarantees."

A few days later, on 13 February, the charge of bribery was dropped due to the statute of limitations. The case was closed

Garzon was later cleared of the indictment relating to his investigation of Francoist atrocities. On 8 February 2012, the United Nations High Commissioner for Human Rights demanded the 1977 Amnesty Law to be repealed, on the basis that it violates international human rights law and under which there is no statute of limitations for crimes against humanity. In 2013, a UN working group of experts again called upon Spain to repeal the 1977 law.

== Allegations of politicisation of the judiciary ==
In June 2010, Garzón was recruited as a consultant to the ICC.

At the end of October 2010, the re-election of Judge Juan Saavedra to the Spanish Supreme Court Penal Division reactivated the three judicial processes against Garzón. The re-appointment of a right-wing judge may have suggested to the Spanish legal authorities that the complaints had sufficient weight to merit continuing the domestic process despite the rulings in the European Court of Human Rights cited above.

In a 2011 book, Garzón wrote that he had at times exceeded the provisions of domestic Spanish legislation, but quoted external sources, including international treaties, to explain his behavior.

== Other work ==
In July 2012, WikiLeaks founder Julian Assange recruited the disbarred Garzón as head of his legal team.

In September 2012, Garzón wrote an article in The Journal Jurisprudence outlining his views on sexual violence during wartimes.

== Awards and honors ==
- 2009 Hermann Kesten Prize
- 2010 International Hrant Dink Award
- 2010 Prix René Cassin awarded by Jeune République, after a jury decision composed by Dominique de Villepin, Luis Moreno-Ocampo, Bertrand Badie, Stanley Hoffmann, Souleymane Bashir Diagne, Eva Joly, Mireille Delmas Marty and others. The work was designed by Miquel Barcelo (May 2010)
- 2011 Kant-Weltbürger-Preis, in Freiburg i.Br. in Germany, after a jury decision of the Kant Gesellschaft. The papers of the ceremony on 7 May 2011 were published in Berthold Lange (Hrsg.), Weltbürgerrrecht, Ergon Verlag, Würzburg, 2012. ISBN 978-3-89913-908-2.Prix

Garzón was awarded 22 Honoris Causa Doctoral Degrees in 10 years, between 1999 and November 2009: 16 from Latin American countries, two from the US, two from the UK, and one from Belgium. His 22nd "Honoris Causa" Doctoral Degree award, awarded by the University of Jaén on 9 November 2009, was his first to be received in Spain.

== Bibliography ==
- Cuento de Navidad: es posible un mundo diferente (Christmas tale: A different world is possible), Ediciones de la Tierra (2002)
- Un mundo sin miedo (A world without fear), Plaza & Janes, S.A. and Debolsillo (February 2005)
- Prologue of ¿Y si mi hijo se droga? Claves prácticas para prevenir, saber y actuar (And if my child starts using drugs? Practical tips to prevent, know, and act), Begoña del Pueyo, Alejandro Perales (Editorial Grijalbo) (June 2005)
- La lucha contra el terrorismo y sus límites (The fight against terrorism and its limits), Adhara Publicaciones, S.L. (February 2006)
- Denis Robert, La justice ou le chaos, Stock, 1996. Interviews and portrait of seven anticorruption judges: Bernard Bertossa, Edmondo Bruti Liberati, Gherardo Colombo, Benoît Dejemeppe, Baltasar Garzón Real, Carlos Jimenez Villarejo, Renaud Van Ruymbeke
- Garzón, Baltasar (2011). La fuerza de la razón [The Power of Reason] (in Spanish). Barcelona: Debate. ISBN 978-84-9992-032-0.

== See also ==
- Carmelo Soria, Spanish diplomat assassinated in 1976 by the Chilean DINA
- Command responsibility
