= Hamed Abderrahaman Ahmad =

Spanish national (born 1974)

Hamed Abderrahman Ahmad
- Born: 1974 (age 51–52); Ceuta, Spain
- Arrested: 2001; Pakistan; Pakistan Armed Forces
- Released: 2006; Spain
- Citizenship: Spain
- Detained at: Guantanamo Bay detention camp (2002-2004); Spanish custody (2005-2006)
- Other name: Ahmad Abd al Rahman Ahmad
- ISN: 267
- Status: Released

Hamed Abderrahman Ahmad (born 1974), also known as Ahmad Abd al Rahman Ahmad, is a Spanish national born in Ceuta, who was captured and arrested by Pakistani soldiers in Pakistan in the fall of 2001 during the United States intervention in Afghanistan. He was transferred to United States military custody and held at Guantanamo Bay detention camp as a suspected enemy combatant from early 2002 to February 14, 2004, the only Spanish citizen to be detained there. His internment serial number (ISN) was 267.

In 2004, the United States allowed his extradition to Spain to face terrorism charges, based on confessions made while in US custody. Spanish authorities alleged that Abderrahman Ahmad was a member of a Spanish al-Qaeda cell. Ahmad was convicted of those charges by the High Court in 2005 and sentenced to six years in prison. Review of the case in an appeal to the Spanish Supreme Court resulted in the conviction being overturned in July 2006, as based on evidence that may have been obtained through torture by American interrogators. Such evidence is inadmissible in Spanish courts.

== Early life ==
Hamed Abderrahaman Ahmad was born to a Muslim family in Ceuta, a Spanish enclave in North Africa. As a young man, he worked in construction when jobs were available.

== Capture in Pakistan ==
Ahmad went to Afghanistan and, after the United States intervention, tried to escape through Pakistan. He was arrested by Pakistani soldiers and transferred to United States military custody in the fall of 2001. He was transferred in 2002 to the Guantanamo Bay detention camp, where he was held as a suspected enemy combatant and interrogated. When captured, he was unmarried.

== Terrorism conviction in Spain and appeal ==
The Spanish judge Baltasar Garzon, prepared the indictment against Ahmad. Prosecutors alleged that Ahmad had gone to Afghanistan to train with followers of Osama bin Laden. Ahmad was convicted in his trial in Spain. On 5 October 2005, Ahmed was sentenced to six years in prison.

Three other detainees indicted with Ahmad were the Moroccan Lahcen Ikassrien, and two legal residents of Britain, Omar Deghayes and Jamil al Banna. Spanish authorities alleged that these four may have had some involvement, not only with the September 11, 2001 attacks in the United States, but also with planning the later 2004 Madrid train bombings.

The Washington Post reported on July 24, 2006, that Ahmad's conviction was overturned, on appeal, by the Spanish Supreme Court. According to Reuters, the Supreme Court found that the Spanish High Court, which had originally convicted Ahmad, had not taken into account his right to the presumption of innocence. The Court said that evidence collected at Guantanamo "should be declared totally void and, as such, non-existent."

In November 2006, the US Embassy in Madrid sent a cable to Washington, released on WikiLeaks on November 30, 2010, which described the Supreme Court findings. The Spanish Supreme Court found that any confessions or evidence obtained outside Spain could not be included in the case. In the absence of any other compelling evidence, it said there was no case as "interrogations, euphemistically called 'interviews,' took place under unequal circumstances because (the defendant) was in detention at the time of the interrogations." The court asserted that Ahmed had been mistreated while in US custody; Reuters suggested this affected the Court's decision.

The Washington Post quoted from the Spanish Supreme Court's decision:

Neither the motivation the subject had to travel to Afghanistan, nor the activities he carried out, justifies the verdict passed by the High Court.

== Garzón's comments on Guantanamo ==
Baltasar Garzón, the most prominent investigative magistrate in Spain, who had requested Ahmad's extradition, discussed the Guantanamo detention camps at a legal conference in late May 2006:

A model like Guantánamo is an insult to countries that respect laws. It delegitimizes us. It is a place that needs to disappear immediately.

Garzón, speaking of the evidence against Ahmad, which was supplied to Spain by United States intelligence officials, said that he was convicted without evidence from Guantanamo:

Everything obtained from there [Guantanamo] was useless because it went against the rules.

(Note: In July 2006 the Spanish Supreme Court overturned Ahmad's conviction on appeal, finding that the High Court had failed to give him the presumption of innocence.)

== Suspected terrorist activity in Ceuta ==
On December 12, 2006, the Spanish government arrested eleven terrorist suspects in Ceuta, the Spanish enclave on the North African coast, including two men said to be brothers of Ahmad. Initial accounts incorrectly said that Ahmad was one of the arrested men. The press reported that the arrested men were associated with the Moroccan Islamic Combat Group, according to the Interior Ministry. The arrested men were believed to have sent recruits to fight in Iraq. CNN said the men were associated with the Salafist Group for Call and Combat.

The Jamestown Foundation described the group as grassroots jihadist; areas of concern by Interior Ministry officials were that the group was trying to recruit Spanish soldiers of Muslim origin who were born in Ceuta, and that they were trying to build on friction resulting from the non-renewal of contracts of some Muslim military members.

== Torture claims investigation ==
On April 29, 2009, that Spanish investigating magistrate Baltazar Garzon initiated a formal investigation into whether confessions from Ahmed and three other former Guantanamo captives were the result of the use of abusive interrogation techniques by the United States. Spain had originally brought charges against these four men, who claimed having suffered torture during US interrogation. Ahmad and the other three men: Lahcen Ikassrien, Jamiel Abdul Latif al Banna and Omar Deghayes, had previously faced charges in Spanish courts, based on confessions they made while in US custody. Their charges had been dropped based on their claims that their confessions were false and obtained through coercive interrogation techniques.
