= Eloy Velasco =

Spanish High Court Judge (born 1963)

Eloy Velasco (born 2 January 1963 in Bilbao, Biscay, Spain) is a Spanish High Court Judge, known for being responsible to determine whether or not six former Bush officials (see Bush Six) should face criminal charges in Spain. He is also known for having accepted the judicial demand against the former Salvadoran president Alfredo Cristiani and other 14 Salvadoran members of the military, for the 1989 murders of Jesuits in El Salvador.

Both cases have been accepted by Spanish courts on the basis of the principle of universal justice, which allows Spanish courts to process crimes against humanity that have occurred in other jurisdictions.
