= Jamil el-Banna =

Palestinian-Jordanian detained without charge at Guantánamo Prison (2002–07)

Jamil el-Banna جميل عبد اللطيف البنا
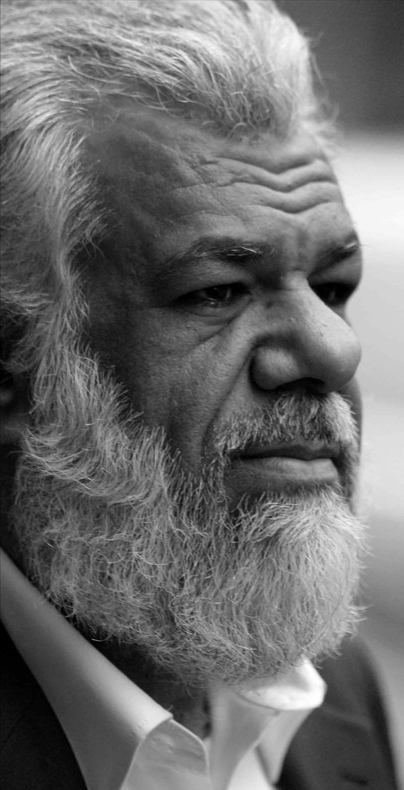
- el-Banna in 2008
- Born: 28 May 1962 (age 64); Jericho, Palestine
- Citizenship: Jordanian citizen refugee status in the United Kingdom
- Detained at: Guantanamo Bay camp
- ISN: 905
- Alleged to be a member of: al-Qaeda
- Spouse: Sabah el-Banna
- Children: 5

Jamil Abdul Latif el-Banna (Arabic: جميل عبد اللطيف البنا, romanized: Jamīl ʿAbd al-Laṭīf al-Bannāʾ), born 28 May 1962, is a Palestinian-Jordanian with refugee status in the United Kingdom, who had been living in northwest London. He was abducted in November 2002 by the CIA from the Gambia while on a business trip, and suffered extraordinary rendition to Bagram, Afghanistan, where he was held and interrogated by the CIA until March 2003. He was transferred to military custody at Guantanamo Bay detainment camp in March 2003, and held there until 19 December 2007.

Following his release and subsequent return to the United Kingdom, Jamil el-Banna was arrested and questioned when arriving in London, on charges by a Spanish court. He was allowed bail. Spain dropped its charges in March 2008.

The United States Department of Defense reported that el-Banna was born on 28 May 1962, in Jericho, Palestine.

== Early life and education ==
Jamil el-Banna was born in Jericho, West Bank in 1962. Soon after his birth, his family moved into Jordan, where they were housed at a refugee camp near Amman. Jamil dropped out of school at age 10, and fell into petty crime.

== Legal resident in United Kingdom ==
In 1994, he made his way to the United Kingdom, where he successfully applied for refugee status. He lived in north-west London. Later, he worked for a friend's brother, who was setting up an edible oil (peanut) factory in the Gambia.

== Jamil el-Banna's detention in The Gambia ==
Jamil, and Bisher al-Rawi flew to the Gambia to meet a shipment of machine parts to be used to set up an edible oil factory, which was owned by Bisher's brother. The two men, along with two others, were taken into custody by the National Intelligence Agency on their arrival at Banjul International Airport in the Gambia on 8 November 2002, purportedly on suspicion of alleged links to al-Qaeda, and advice from British security authorities. At first, the two men were under a kind of unofficial house arrest. They were not formally charged with any crimes under Gambian law. They were told that they would be released when their machinery had been checked to make sure it was not something that could be used for terrorism. They were not detained in a Gambian jail, but rather in a CIA 'snatch team' safe house, which was provided by American security officials. They were guarded by Gambians and interrogated by American agents.

In late December 2002, the CIA decided to transport them from the Gambia. The 'black team' that arrived to escort them wore black uniforms, and their faces were covered by black balaclavas. They cut the clothes from the detainees' bodies and bound them for transportation. The two men were illegally 'rendered' to Bagram Air Base in Afghanistan, where Jamil el-Banna was imprisoned underground in total darkness for weeks.

Once in the main area of the airbase prison, he met Moazzam Begg, a British citizen whose bookshop he had visited in England. Nicknamed 'Kenny Rogers', el-Banna once entertained American guards by singing half a verse of Coward of the County.

In March 2003, Jamil and Bisher al-Rawi were transferred to United States military custody at Guantanamo Bay detention camp.

== Allegations of torture ==
The Guardian reported that Clive Stafford Smith, Jamil el-Banna's lawyer, said his client had participated in both the hunger strike that ended when the camp authorities made promises on 28 July 2005, and a second that started on 8 August. They were protesting the detention without charges, and abuses and mistreatment. Stafford Smith said that Jamil told him that one of the reasons for the second hunger strike was that guards were still searching through the prisoner's copies of the Qur'an by hand.

A December 2005 article in The Times repeated Jamil's claim that his American interrogators told him that MI5 had colluded in his extraordinary rendition.

The lawyers of Guantanamo Bay detainees have to hand in all their notes to the authorities, which consider them 'classified'. The lawyers may only examine their own notes in a single secure location near Washington, DC. The Times reported material from Stafford Smith's notes on conversations with his client, which were recently declassified:

In Cuba, one interrogator is alleged to have told el-Banna: "Why are you angry at America? It is your government, Britain, the MI5, who called the CIA and told them you and Bisher were in Gambia and to come and get you. Britain gave everything to us. Britain sold you out to the CIA."

Jamil el-Banna said that he was offered $10 million, and a US passport by US agents, if he would testify against Abu Qatada. According to The Times, he said:

When he refused, an interrogator told him: "I am going to London . . . I am going to fuck your wife. Your wife is going to be my bitch. Maybe you'll never see your children again."

== Contact with his family ==
El-Banna is married to Sabah el-Banna, born 8 December 1964, and the father of five children who are Anas, born 17 December 1996, Mohamed, born 22 December 1997, Abdulrahman, born 10 May 1999, Badeah, born 11 February 2001, and Mariam, born 13 April 2003.

His youngest daughter was born after his abduction by the Gambians.

Dear Sir Tony Blair, I am a boy called Anas Jamil el-Banna. I am 7 years old. Me and my four brothers are writing to you this letter from my heart because I miss my father. I am wishing that you can help me and my father. I am always asking mother, Where is my father, when will he come back? And my mother says I don't know.

Now I have started to know that my father is in prison in a place called Cuba and I don't know the reason why and I don't know where is Cuba. I hope that you can help me because I miss my father. Every night I think of my dad and I cry in a very low voice so that my mother doesn't hear, and I dream that he is coming home and gives me a big, big hug.

Every Eid I wait for my father to come back. I hope to God that you can help me to bring my daddy back to me. I don't want anything, I just want my daddy please.

Please Mr Blair can you bring my daddy back to me on this Eid. I wish you a happy life with your children in your house. Love Anas - 7 years old, Mohamed - 6 years, Abdulrahman - 4 years, Badeah - 3 years, Mariam - 9 months

— Anas Jamil el-Banna writing to Tony Blair to free his father

A 1 November 2006 article in the Willesden & Brent Times reported that el-Banna was allowed his first phone call to his wife on 19 October 2006, after four years' detention. At the time, it was rare for detainees to be allowed a phone call to their family. This phone call was el-Banna's first. It is not known why this concession was made, although el-Banna's MP, Sarah Teather, had previously asked US authorities to allow some contact.

According to el-Banna' wife:

He told me that when the prison guards led him away from his camp, he thought he was going to be interrogated again. He didn't even know he was going to speak to me, so hearing my voice was a complete shock to him.

— Mrs al-Banna

== Bisher al-Rawi's release ==
On 29 March 2007, UK Foreign Secretary Margaret Beckett, MP announced that the UK Government had negotiated the return from Guantanamo of el-Banna's traveling companion, Bisher al-Rawi, also a legal British resident. According to the Associated Press, Beckett issued a statement to Parliament:

We have now agreed with the U.S. authorities that Mr. al-Rawi will be returned to the U.K. shortly, as soon as the practical arrangements have been made. This decision follows extensive discussions to address the security implications of Mr. Al-Rawi's return. March 2007 UK Foreign Secretary Margaret Beckett

Beckett's announcement did not refer to el-Banna, or the other remaining former UK residents who were still held in Guantanamo Bay. The cases of Jamil el-Banna and other former British legal residents have been controversial within the UK, as there was growing public sentiment for the government to seek their release. It had not acted for former residents as it had for British citizens. All the British nationals imprisoned at Guantanamo were freed before September 2004.

== Release ==
On 7 August 2007, the United Kingdom government requested the release of Jamil el-Banna and four other foreign nationals who had been legal British residents. The UK government warned its public that the negotiations might take months. Jamil el-Banna was released from Guantanamo Bay on 18 November 2007, and flown back to Britain. On his return, he was detained under port and border controls and questioned. On 19 November, he was arrested under a Spanish extradition warrant for allegedly having been connected to al-Qaeda in Madrid. On 20 December, he was released on bail of £50,000, part of which was put up by actress Vanessa Redgrave; conditions of his bail include observing a curfew and wearing an electronic tag.

On his return, Omar Deghayes was also arrested and questioned, before appearing in court on a Spanish extradition warrant. He was freed on bail on 20 December, conditions of which include obeying a curfew and wearing an electronic tag.

On 6 March 2008, Spanish judge Baltasar Garzon dropped the extradition request on humanitarian grounds. Garzon based his decision on a medical examination made public on 12 February 2008. The report said el-Banna suffered from: "post-traumatic stress syndrome, severe depression, and suicidal tendencies. Garzon ruled the two men's mental health had deteriorated so badly it would be cruel to prosecute them.

== Torture claims investigation ==
On 29 April 2009, Spanish investigating magistrate Baltazar Garzon initiated a formal investigation into whether confessions from Ikassrien, and three other former Guantanamo captives were the result of the use of abusive interrogation techniques. el-Banna and the other three men: Hamed Abderrahman Ahmed, Lahcen Ikassrien, and Omar Deghayes, had previously faced charges in Spanish courts, based on confessions they made while in US custody. The charges had been dropped based on their claims that their confessions were false and were the result of abusive interrogation techniques.

== See also ==
- Shaker Aamer
- Mohamedou Ould Slahi
