= Jay Bybee =

American judge (born 1953)

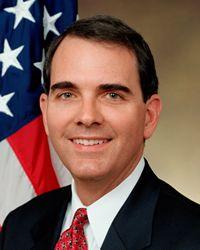
- Bybee in 2002

Senior Judge of the United States Court of Appeals for the Ninth Circuit
- Incumbent
- Assumed office December 31, 2019

Judge of the United States Court of Appeals for the Ninth Circuit
- In office March 21, 2003 – December 31, 2019
- Appointed by: George W. Bush
- Preceded by: Procter Ralph Hug Jr.
- Succeeded by: Lawrence VanDyke

United States Assistant Attorney General for the Office of Legal Counsel
- In office November 2001 – March 13, 2003
- President: George W. Bush
- Deputy: John Yoo
- Preceded by: Randolph D. Moss
- Succeeded by: Jack Goldsmith

Personal details
- Born: Jay Scott Bybee; October 27, 1953 (age 73) Oakland, California, U.S.
- Education: Brigham Young University (BA, JD)

Jay Scott Bybee (born October 27, 1953) is an American lawyer and jurist serving as a senior U.S. circuit judge of the Court of Appeals for the Ninth Circuit. He has published numerous articles in law journals and has taught as a senior fellow in constitutional law at William S. Boyd School of Law. His primary research interests are in constitutional and administrative law.

While serving in the Bush administration as the assistant attorney general for the Office of Legal Counsel, Bybee signed the controversial "Torture Memos" in August 2002. These authorized "enhanced interrogation techniques" were used in the systematic torture of detainees at Guantanamo Bay detention camp beginning in 2002 and at the Abu Ghraib facility following the United States' invasion of Iraq in 2003. These actions have widely been considered to be war crimes, including by other former members of the Bush administration.

== Early life and education ==
Born in Oakland, California, Bybee was raised in Clark County, Nevada. His family subsequently moved to Nashville, Tennessee, then Louisville, Kentucky. He graduated magna cum laude with a Bachelor of Arts degree from Brigham Young University (BYU) in 1977, majoring in economics. He earned his Juris Doctor cum laude from BYU's J. Reuben Clark Law School in 1980. While in law school, he served on the editorial board of the BYU Law Review. Bybee spent one year as law clerk to Judge Donald S. Russell of the United States Court of Appeals for the Fourth Circuit.

== Career ==
=== Academics ===
From 1991 to 1999, Bybee taught at the Paul M. Hebert Law Center at Louisiana State University. Subsequently, he was a founding faculty member of the William S. Boyd School of Law at the University of Nevada, Las Vegas, where he taught from 1999 to 2001. At both schools, he taught constitutional law, administrative law, and civil procedure. In 2000, Bybee was voted Professor of the Year. His particular areas of expertise are civil procedure, constitutional law, and the federal courts.

=== Legal scholarship ===
Bybee has co-authored two books, Powers Reserved for the People and the States: A History of the Ninth and Tenth Amendments (2006) (with Thomas B. McAffee and A. Christopher Bryant), and Religious Liberty Under the Free Exercise Clause. Bybee has also written more than 20 law review articles, notes, comments, and book chapters.

=== Office of Legal Counsel ===
Bybee served as the assistant attorney general for the Office of Legal Counsel (OLC) in the United States Justice Department from November 2001 to March 2003.

==== Torture memos ====
Following the September 11 attacks, the George W. Bush administration classified detainees as unlawful combatants, claiming they were not protected under the Geneva Conventions as prisoners of war. In late 2001 and early 2002, these detainees were subjected to beatings, electric shocks, exposure to extreme cold, suspension from the ceiling by their arms, and drowning in buckets of water. An unknown number died as a result. In April 2002, the CIA had captured its first important prisoner, Abu Zubaydah, who was transferred to a CIA black site and subjected to sleep deprivation using bright lights and loud music, all prior to any legal authorization from the US Justice Department. Later that April, CIA contractor James Mitchell proposed a list of additional tactics, including locking people in cramped boxes, shackling them in painful positions, keeping them awake for a week at a time, covering them with insects, and waterboarding, a practice which the United States had previously characterized in war crimes prosecutions as torture.

Jose Rodriguez, head of the CIA's clandestine service, asked his superiors for authorization for what Rodriguez called an "alternative set of interrogation procedures." The CIA sought immunity from prosecution, sometimes known as a "get out of jail free card." To this end, CIA acting General Counsel John A. Rizzo requested a legal opinion, which was routed to the OLC by White House General Counsel Alberto Gonzales, who desired the "ability to quickly obtain information from captured terrorists and their sponsors." The CIA requested an interpretation of the statutory term of "torture" as defined in 18 U.S.C. § 2340, which implements, in part, the obligations of the United States under the 1984 United Nations Convention against Torture and Other Cruel, Inhuman or Degrading Treatment or Punishment.

Together with John Yoo, Bybee drafted the Torture Memos, a set of legal memoranda which gave the CIA legal cover to torture detainees using "enhanced interrogation techniques". These techniques are viewed as torture by the Justice Department, Amnesty International, Human Rights Watch, medical experts in the treatment of torture victims, intelligence officials, and American allies.

According to journalist Seymour Hersh, Bybee wrote in a memo that "for an act to constitute torture it must inflict pain...equivalent in intensity to the pain accompanying serious physical injury, such as organ failure, impairment of bodily function, or even death." For this and other memos, critics have called for his impeachment or resignation. Bybee and five others, known as the "Bush Six", were the subject of a war crimes investigation in Spain, but the government decided against prosecution in 2011.

A memo declassified in 2012 indicates that some in the Bush State Department believed that the methods were illegal under domestic and international law, and constituted war crimes. Secretary of State Colin Powell strongly opposed the invalidation of the Geneva Conventions, and U.S. Navy general counsel Alberto J. Mora campaigned internally against what he saw as the "catastrophically poor legal reasoning" of the memo. Philip D. Zelikow, former State Department adviser to Condoleezza Rice, in 2009 testified to the Senate Judiciary Committee studying the matter, "It seemed to me that the OLC interpretation of U.S. constitutional law in this area was strained and indefensible. I could not imagine any federal court in America agreeing that the entire CIA program could be conducted and it would not violate the American Constitution." Zelikow also alleged that Bush administration officials attempted to destroy his memos alleging fault in Bybee's reasoning.

Human Rights Watch and The New York Times editorial board have called for the prosecution of Bybee for "conspiracy to torture as well as other crimes".

==== Office of Professional Responsibility investigation ====
In July 2009, after a five-year inquiry, the Office of Professional Responsibility released a report, later modified by the Justice Department, saying Bybee and his deputy John Yoo committed "professional misconduct" by providing legal advice that was in possible violation of international and federal laws on torture. The OPR initial report recommended that both Bybee and Yoo be referred to the bar associations of the states where they were licensed for further disciplinary action and possible disbarment. The final recommendations in the report were overruled by Associate Deputy Attorney General David Margolis, who examined the OPR report and wrote that Bybee and Yoo had used "poor judgement" but did not "knowingly or recklessly provide incorrect legal advice or ... provide advice in bad faith."

Margolis's decision not to refer Yoo and Bybee to the bar for discipline was criticized by numerous commentators.

== Federal judicial service ==
Bybee was first nominated to the United States Court of Appeals for the Ninth Circuit, the largest U.S. appellate court, on May 22, 2002. The Senate recessed for mid-term elections without acting on the nomination, which was "returned without action" in November 2002 under Senate Rule XXXI, Paragraph 6.

President George W. Bush resubmitted his nomination on January 7, 2003. The Senate Judiciary Committee reported favorably on Bybee's nomination by a 12–6 vote (10 Republicans and 2 Democrats for, 6 Democrats against) in late February and forwarded the nomination to the full Senate for consideration. Senate deliberations took place on March 13, 2003. The Senate confirmed Bybee's nomination by a 74-19 vote the same day. Bybee received his commission on March 21, 2003. Justice Sandra Day O'Connor administered the oath of office at the United States Supreme Court building on March 28, 2003.

Democratic Senator Charles Schumer noted that he supported Bybee's confirmation specifically because the judge's conservative views would help to moderate "the most liberal court in the country." Some critics decried his confirmation, calling Bybee "an extremist who takes an overly limited view of federal power" and criticizing his "narrow view of individual rights", including abortion and gay marriage.

Bybee was confirmed in 2003, more than a year before news of his role in the torture memos was revealed. According to Senator Patrick Leahy, "If the Bush administration and Mr. Bybee had told the truth," regarding Bybee's role in the Torture Memos, "he never would have been confirmed."

In July 2019, it was reported that Bybee planned to assume senior status by the end of the year. On September 20, 2019, President Donald Trump announced his intent to nominate Lawrence VanDyke to Bybee's seat. VanDyke was confirmed by the Senate on December 11, 2019. Bybee assumed senior status on December 31, 2019.

=== Significant opinions ===
On January 13, 2005, in a 2–1 decision, Bybee wrote for the majority in United States v. Bruce. This case refined the rules for defining whether or not an individual is considered a Native American. The current two-prong Rogers approach requires that the individual's degree of Indian blood as well as his tribal or government recognition as an Indian be taken into consideration.

On August 2, 2005, Bybee was one of three judges on a Ninth Circuit panel that ruled on Doe v. Kamehameha Schools. With Judge Robert Beezer, Bybee voted for the majority decision that the schools' admissions policy constitutes "unlawful race discrimination". The two judges said the private school's policy violates federal civil rights law. Susan Graber issued a partial dissent. That panel's ruling was overturned on December 5, 2006, by an 8–7 decision of the Ninth Circuit's fully active appeals judges en banc, after a rehearing sought by Kamehameha Schools.

On January 10, 2006, in an en banc decision, Judge Bybee wrote the opinion for the majority in the case of Smith v. Salish Kootenai College. In that case, James Smith sought to have a case heard in federal court which he had previously brought in a tribal court. When he disagreed with the tribal court's decision, he claimed that it had had no jurisdiction in the first place. In an 8-3 decision, the Court upheld the tribal court's jurisdiction over the subject matter, thereby strengthening tribal courts' rights to claim jurisdiction.

On September 11, 2006, Bybee wrote the majority opinion in Kesser v. Cambra, granting habeas corpus to the defendant by a 6–5 vote. Richard Kesser had been convicted of hiring a hitman to kill his former wife and was sentenced to life without parole. During Kesser's trial in 1995, the prosecutor had eliminated three Native American jurors and one Asian juror for racial reasons. Effectively granting Kesser a new trial, this decision laid out the current Batson analysis in the Ninth Circuit.

On November 7, 2006, Bybee wrote on behalf of a unanimous three-judge panel in the case of Lankford v. Arave. Mark Lankford had been convicted of murder and sentenced to death nearly two decades earlier. The Ninth Circuit granted habeas corpus based on ineffective assistance of counsel and faulty jury instructions, and noted that there was support for Lankford's theory that his brother committed the murders in question.

On August 21, 2008, in U.S. v. Craighead, the Ninth Circuit held that the defendant's rights had been violated when he was interrogated in his own home without first being read his Miranda rights. In that case, numerous law enforcement officers had arrived at the defendant's home because he was suspected of having downloaded child pornography. In a decision written by Bybee, the Court held that the defendant's interrogation had been custodial and therefore violated his Fifth Amendment rights.

On November 7, 2008 (but amended twice in January 2009), the Ninth Circuit tackled the issue of due process rights of individuals who were mistakenly placed on the California Child Abuse Central Index (CCACI), a registry for accused and known child abusers. In Los Angeles County v. Humphries, Craig and Wendy Humphries fought to have their names removed from the CCACI after the courts had cleared them completely of abuse charges brought by a child. Because the state of California had no system in place for removing names that did not belong on the CCACI, the Court held that the CCACI violated the due process rights of those who had been falsely accused but could not get their names removed from the CCACI.

On December 30, 2008, Bybee wrote the opinion for the Ninth Circuit in Gonzalez v. Duncan. In that case, Cecilio Gonzalez had failed to reregister as a sex offender within five working days of his birthday. Because of prior convictions, he had been sentenced to twenty-seven years to life under California's Three strikes law. The Court held that the sentence was grossly disproportionate to the crime.

On August 29, 2012, Bybee, who previously wrote the dissent in a three-judge panel's ruling, authored the majority opinion that found Arizona sheriff Joe Arpaio and special prosecutor Dennis Wilenchik were not entitled to governmental immunity. The case involved the alleged false arrest of two newspaper publishers who had criticized the Maricopa County, Arizona, sheriff. In an 11-judge en banc hearing, the Ninth Circuit reversed the panel's decision and held the two defendants could be civilly tried for a potential award of damages for the arrests, violations of free speech and alleged selective enforcement.

On March 24, 2021, Bybee wrote the 7–4 majority opinion in Young v. State of Hawaii (en banc), a case that upheld Hawaii's law that requires someone to demonstrate the "urgency or need" to openly carry a firearm in order to do so.

== Personal life ==
Bybee is married to Dianna Greer, a high school teacher. On November 19, 2013, Bybee's twenty-six-year-old son, Scott Greer Bybee, committed suicide at the Las Vegas Mormon Temple. A lifelong member of the Church of Jesus Christ of Latter-day Saints (LDS Church), Bybee served a mission for the LDS Church in Santiago, Chile from 1973 to 1975.

== Publications ==
- Jay Bybee, Thomas B. McAffee and A. Christopher Bryant. Powers Reserved for the People and the States: A History of the Ninth and Tenth Amendments. (Westport, Conn.: Praeger Publishers, 2006.) ISBN 0-313-31372-5.
- Jay Bybee, Religious Liberty Under the Free Exercise Clause. (Washington, D.C.: Office of Legal Policy, Dept. of Justice, 1988)
- Bybee, Jay; Samahon, Tuan N. (April 2010). "William Rehnquist, the Separation of Powers, and the Riddle of the Sphinx". Stanford Law Review. 58 (6): 1735.
- "Judging the Tournament," 32 FLA. ST. U. L. REV. 1055 (2005) (with Thomas J. Miles)
- "Of Orphans and Vouchers: Nevada's 'Little Blaine Amendment' and the Future of Religious Participation in Public Programs," 2 NEV. L.J. 551 (2002) (with David W. Newton)
- "Printz, the Unitary Executive, and the Fire in the Trash Can: Has Justice Scalia Picked the Court's Pocket?". Notre Dame Law Review. 77 (1): 269. 2001.
- "Common Ground: Robert Jackson, Antonin Scalia, and a Power Theory of the First Amendment". Tulane Law Review. 75 (2). 2000.
- "The Tenth Amendment Among the Shadows: On Reading the Constitution in Plato's Cave". Harvard Journal of Law and Public Policy. 23 (2): 551. 2000.
- "Domestic Violence Clause," in ENCYCLOPEDIA OF THE AMERICAN CONSTITUTION (Leonard W. Levy et al. eds., 2d ed. 2000)
- "Child Support Recovery Act" (1992), in ENCYCLOPEDIA OF THE AMERICAN CONSTITUTION (Leonard W. Levy et al. eds., 2d ed. 2000)
- "Agency Expertise, ALJ Independence, and Administrative Courts: The Recent Changes in Louisiana's Administrative Procedure Act", 59 LA. L. REV. 431 (1999)
- "The Equal Process Clause: A Note on the (Non).Relationship Between Romer v. Evans and Hunter v. Erickson", 6 WM. & MARY BILL RTS. J. 201 (1997)
- "Insuring Domestic Tranquility: Lopez, Federalization of Crime, and the Forgotten Role of theDomestic Violence Clause", 66 GEO. WASH. L. REV. 1 (1997)
- "Who Executes the Executioner? Impeachment, Indictment and Other Alternatives to Assassination", 2 NEXUS 53 (1997)
- "Ulysses at the Mast: Democracy, Federalism, and the Sirens' Song of the Seventeenth Amendment", 91 NW. U.L. REV. 500 (1997)
- "Substantive Due Process and Free Exercise of Religion: Meyer, Pierce and the Origins of Wisconsin v. Yoder", 25 CAP. U.L. REV. 887 (1996)
- "Taking Liberties with the First Amendment: Congress, Section 5, and the Religious Freedom Restoration Act", 48 VAND. L. REV. 1539 (1995)
- "Advising the President: Separation of Powers and the Federal Advisory Committee Act", 104 YALE L.J. 51 (1994)
- "George Sutherland", in THE SUPREME COURT JUSTICES: ILLUSTRATED BIOGRAPHIES, 1789–1993 (Clare Cushman ed. 1993)
- "Owen J. Roberts", in THE SUPREME COURT JUSTICES: ILLUSTRATED BIOGRAPHIES, 1789–1993 (Clare Cushman ed. 1993)
- "Utah's Horseman: George Sutherland", 13 SUP. CT. HIST. Q. 14 (No. 2, 1992)
- "Note, Reverse Political Checkoff Per Se Illegal as Violation of Federal Election Campaign Act", 1980 BYU L. REV. 403
- "Comment, Profits in Subrogation: An Insurer's Claim to Be More Than Indemnified". BYU Law Review. 145. 1979. Reprinted in 30 FED'N INS. COUNS. Q. 249 (1980)

== See also ==
- Bush Six
- John Yoo
- United States v. Camacho

Legal offices
Preceded by Procter Ralph Hug Jr.	Judge of the United States Court of Appeals for the Ninth Circuit; 2003–2019	Succeeded by Lawrence VanDyke
