= Abbas Rehema =

Iraqi footballer

Abbas Hussein Rehema Al-Mutairi
Personal information
- Date of birth: 1 July 1989 (age 37)
- Place of birth: Baghdad, Iraq
- Position: Midfielder

Youth career
- 2003–2009: Al-Shuala FC

Senior career*
Years	Team	Apps	(Gls)
2009–2011	Al-Zawra'a SC		
2011–2012	Najaf FC		
2012–2013	Al-Shorta	4	(0)
2013–2014	Al-Talaba		
2015–2016	Zakho	10	

International career^{‡}
2012	Iraq	2	(0)
- * Club domestic league appearances and goals as of 10 January 2012 ‡ National team caps and goals as of October 16, 2012

Abbas Hussein Rehema Al-Mutairi (Arabic: عباس حسين رحيمة المطيري, born July 1, 1989) is an Iraqi footballer who plays as a midfielder for Al Shorta. He was called up for the Iraq national football team for the 2014 World Cup qualification. He is the younger brother of Ali Rehema the Iraq national team defender.

== Honours ==
=== Country ===
- 2012 Arab Nations Cup Bronze medallist
