= Opinion polling for the 2026 Spanish general election =

In the run up to the 2026 Spanish general election, various organisations carry out opinion polling to gauge voting intention in Spain during the term of the 15th Cortes Generales. Results of such polls are displayed in this article. The date range for these opinion polls is from the previous general election, held on 23 July 2023, to the day the next election will be held, on 29 November 2026.

Voting intention estimates refer mainly to a hypothetical Congress of Deputies election. Polls are listed in reverse chronological order, showing the most recent first and using the dates when the survey fieldwork was done, as opposed to the date of publication. Where the fieldwork dates are unknown, the date of publication is given instead. The highest percentage figure in each polling survey is displayed with its background shaded in the leading party's colour. If a tie ensues, this is applied to the figures with the highest percentages. The "Lead" columns on the right shows the percentage-point difference between the parties with the highest percentages in a poll.

== Electoral polling ==
=== Nationwide polling ===
==== Graphical summary ====
Local regression trend line of poll results from 23 July 2023 to the present day, with each line corresponding to a political party.

==== Voting intention estimates ====
The table below lists nationwide voting intention estimates. Refusals are generally excluded from the party vote percentages, while question wording and the treatment of "don't know" responses and those not intending to vote may vary between polling organisations. When available, seat projections determined by the polling organisations are displayed below (or in place of) the percentages in a smaller font; 176 seats are required for an absolute majority in the Congress of Deputies.

===== 2026 (Oct–Nov) =====
Polling firm/Commissioner	Fieldwork date	Sample size	Turnout	PP	PSOE	Vox	FA	FV	ERC	Junts	EH Bildu	PNV	BNG	CCa	Adelante Andalucía (2021)	Podemos	SALF	Lead
40dB/Prisa	18–22 Nov	2,000	75	31.8; 127/136	30.9; 116/127	17.3; 51/61	4.4; 5/8	1.3; 3	? 10	? 4	? 7	? 3	? 2	? 1	? 3	1.1; 0/1	? 0	0.9
SocioMétrica/El Español	1 Sep–22 Nov	7,266	?	32.1; 134	28.7; 114	18.4; 63	4.9; 5	1.0; 3	2.5; 9	1.4; 5	1.5; 8	0.8; 3	1.0; 2	0.4; 1	1.7; 3	1.0; 0	2.2; 0	3.4
Data10/Okdiario	18–21 Nov	3,000	72.6	32.1; 133	27.0; 111	19.0; 63	6.6; 10		–	–	–	–	–	–	–	–	–	5.1
Sondaxe/La Voz de Galicia	17–21 Nov	1,000	71.9	31.1; 130	28.2; 115	17.3; 58	5.4; 8	2.0; 5	2.7; 10	1.7; 7	1.4; 7	0.8; 4	1.0; 2	0.6; 1	1.7; 3	1.5; 0	1.7; 0	2.9
40dB/Prisa	17–21 Nov	2,000	?	31.9; 127/138	31.6; 119/130	16.9; 49/59	4.1; 5/8	1.2; 3	? 11	? 3	? 7	? 3	? 2	? 1	? 3	1.0; 0/1	1.4; 0	0.3
Sigma Dos/El Mundo	16–21 Nov	4,616	?	31.7; 132	28.3; 117	17.9; 58	7.2; 12		? 10/12	? 3/4	? 6/7	? 3/4	? 2/3	? 0/1	? 5	0.7; 0	–	3.4
EM-Analytics/Electomanía	9–21 Nov	7,982	?	31.2; 129	28.4; 122	18.3; 57	5.8; 9	1.8; 2	2.6; 9	1.2; 4	1.5; 7	0.8; 3	0.9; 2	0.3; 0	1.7; 4	0.9; 2	2.1; 0	2.8
SW Demoscopia/La Séptima	26 Oct–21 Nov	12,000	?	29.9; 125	32.5; 134	15.8; 50	6.8; 10		–	–	–	–	–	–	–	–	–	2.6
SocioMétrica/El Español	1 Sep–21 Nov	6,842	?	32.3; 134	28.5; 113	18.8; 65	4.9; 5	1.0; 2	2.5; 9	1.3; 5	1.5; 8	0.8; 3	1.0; 2	0.4; 1	1.6; 3	1.0; 0	2.2; 0	3.8
Data10/Okdiario	17–20 Nov	3,000	72.2	32.3; 135	26.6; 108	19.0; 63	6.7; 11		–	–	–	–	–	–	–	–	–	5.7
Sondaxe/La Voz de Galicia	16–20 Nov	1,000	71.6	30.0; 124	27.7; 112	18.8; 68	6.6; 9	1.6; 3	2.7; 10	1.6; 7	1.5; 8	0.6; 3	1.0; 2	0.5; 1	1.5; 3	1.2; 0	1.6; 0	2.3
40dB/Prisa	16–20 Nov	2,000	?	31.9; 127/137	31.2; 121/129	17.1; 50/60	4.3; 5/8	1.2; 3	? 10	? 3	? 7	? 3	? 2	? 1	? 3	1.1; 0/1	1.5; 0	0.7
Sigma Dos/El Mundo	14–20 Nov	4,511	?	31.5; 126/132	28.0; 112/118	18.3; 57/62	5.7; 6/8	1.5; 3/4	2.7; 10/11	1.5; 4/5	1.6; 7/8	0.9; 4/5	1.0; 2	0.4; 0/1	1.6; 2/3	0.7; 0	–	3.5
Ipsos/La Vanguardia	13–20 Nov	1,999	72–74	30.3; 127	29.8; 119	17.9; 63	4.8; 6	1.0; 3	2.7; 11	1.3; 5	1.4; 7	0.8; 3	0.6; 1	0.4; 1	2.1; 4	1.1; 0	1.9; 0	0.5
Hamalgama Métrica/Vozpópuli	10–20 Nov	1,000	?	32.2; 132	25.4; 98	20.6; 80	6.5; 9		2.2; 9	1.5; 6	1.4; 7	0.9; 4	0.8; 2	–	1.5; 3	1.2; 0	–	6.8
EM-Analytics/Electomanía	9–20 Nov	7,109	?	31.0; 126	27.9; 121	18.5; 59	5.7; 11	1.6; 2	2.5; 9	1.1; 4	1.5; 7	0.8; 3	0.9; 2	0.3; 0	1.6; 4	0.9; 2	2.1; 0	3.1
SW Demoscopia/La Séptima	26 Oct–20 Nov	11,500	?	29.9; 121/127	32.5; 131/136	15.9; 47/55	6.8; 9/11		? 10/12	? 3/4	? 7	? 3	? 2	? 1	? 3	–	–	2.6
Metroscopia	19 Nov	?	?	30.0	30.0	19.0	–	–	–	–	–	–	–	–	–	–	–	Tie
Winston/Artículo14	17–19 Nov	1,482	?	31.1; 130	28.2; 116	17.7; 61	6.4; 9		–	–	–	–	–	–	–	1.6; 0	2.6; 0	2.9
DYM/Henneo	17–19 Nov	1,010	?	33.0; 132/139	28.0; 107/114	18.0; 58/64	6.9; 8/13		–	–	–	–	–	–	–	1.3; 0	–	5.0
GAD3/Vocento	16–19 Nov	1,501	?	31.1; 131	28.4; 110	18.1; 63	6.5; 9	1.5; 5	2.6; 11	1.1; 4	1.6; 7	1.0; 4	0.9; 2	0.3; 1	1.9; 3	1.1; 1	1.3; 0	2.7
More in Common	16–19 Nov	2,315	74.2	28.9	28.0	19.8	7.1		–	–	–	–	–	–	–	1.7	2.3	0.9
Data10/Okdiario	16–19 Nov	2,600	71.2	31.5; 129	26.9; 112	19.4; 66	6.5; 9		–	–	–	–	–	–	–	–	–	4.6
Sondaxe/La Voz de Galicia	15–19 Nov	1,000	?	29.5; 125	27.9; 110	19.8; 70	5.2; 7	1.9; 6	2.7; 11	1.5; 6	1.5; 8	0.4; 2	1.0; 2	0.5; 1	1.4; 3	0.9; 0	2.0; 0	1.6
40dB/Prisa	15–19 Nov	2,000	?	32.2; 127/139	30.2; 115/123	17.6; 56/62	4.1; 5/8	1.2; 3	? 10	? 3	? 7	? 3	? 2	? 1	? 3	1.1; 0/1	1.7; 0	2.0
Sigma Dos/El Mundo	13–19 Nov	4,561	?	31.2; 125/131	27.6; 111/117	18.9; 57/62	5.5; 7/9	1.6; 4/5	2.5; 9/10	1.3; 4/5	1.6; 6/8	1.0; 4/5	1.1; 2/3	0.4; 0/1	1.7; 3/4	0.8; 0	–	3.6
EM-Analytics/Electomanía	9–19 Nov	6,559	?	31.0; 129	27.6; 121	18.2; 56	6.0; 12	1.6; 2	2.3; 8	1.1; 4	1.5; 7	0.8; 3	0.9; 2	0.3; 0	1.6; 4	0.9; 2	2.3; 0	3.4
SW Demoscopia/La Séptima	26 Oct–19 Nov	11,000	?	29.6; 119/126	32.1; 129/135	16.3; 50/58	6.9; 9/12		–	–	–	–	–	–	–	–	–	2.5
Sondaxe/La Voz de Galicia	14–18 Nov	1,000	70.7	29.3; 123	27.8; 110	19.7; 70	5.3; 7	1.7; 5	2.5; 10	1.4; 6	1.8; 9	0.4; 3	1.0; 2	0.3; 1	1.6; 3	0.9; 1	2.2; 0	1.5
40dB/Prisa	14–18 Nov	2,000	?	32.4; 128/140	30.4; 116/125	17.2; 53/61	4.2; 5/8	1.2; 3	? 9	? 3	? 7	? 3	? 2	? 1	? 3	1.2; 0/1	1.7; 0	2.0
Data10/Okdiario	13–18 Nov	2,300	?	31.6; 130	26.5; 109	19.4; 66	6.7; 10		–	–	–	–	–	–	–	–	–	5.1
Sigma Dos/El Mundo	12–18 Nov	4,491	?	31.0; 125/131	27.1; 110/116	19.4; 59/64	5.5; 7/9	1.6; 4/5	2.3; 8/9	1.4; 4/5	1.6; 6/8	1.0; 4/5	1.1; 2/3	0.4; 0/1	1.7; 3/4	0.8; 0	–	3.9
EM-Analytics/Electomanía	9–18 Nov	5,704	?	30.4; 127	27.6; 120	18.7; 60	5.8; 11	1.6; 2	2.3; 8	1.2; 5	1.5; 7	0.8; 3	0.9; 2	0.3; 0	1.6; 4	1.1; 1	2.4; 0	2.8
SW Demoscopia/La Séptima	26 Oct–18 Nov	10,500	?	29.4; 119/125	31.8; 128/133	16.4; 50/58	7.3; 10/13		2.8; 11/13	1.3; 3/4	1.3; 7	0.7; 3	1.0; 2	0.4; 1	1.6; 3	1.6; 0/1	2.0; 0	2.4
Public First/Politico	15–17 Nov	2,454	?	29.5	27.2	19.6	5.9		2.9	1.0	1.3	0.9	0.9	–	1.8	2.2	2.0	2.3
Sondaxe/La Voz de Galicia	13–17 Nov	1,000	72.9	28.5; 121	27.8; 112	19.6; 69	5.3; 8	1.8; 6	2.7; 12	1.0; 4	1.9; 10	0.5; 2	1.0; 2	0.2; 0	1.3; 3	1.0; 0	2.7; 1	0.7
40dB/Prisa	13–17 Nov	2,000	?	32.2; 128/139	30.7; 118/127	17.0; 51/60	4.0; 4/8	1.2; 3	? 10	? 4	? 7	? 3	? 2	? 1	? 3	1.2; 0/1	1.7; 0	1.5
Data10/Okdiario	?–17 Nov	?	?	31.4; 129	26.4; 108	19.7; 68	6.5; 9		–	–	–	–	–	–	–	–	–	5.0
Sigma Dos/El Mundo	11–17 Nov	4,511	77.3	30.7; 123/129	26.7; 108/114	19.7; 62/67	5.4; 7/9	1.5; 3/5	2.3; 8/9	1.4; 4/5	1.6; 6/8	1.0; 4/5	1.1; 2/3	0.4; 0/1	1.7; 3/5	0.8; 0	–	4.0
EM-Analytics/Electomanía	9–17 Nov	4,927	?	30.8; 127	27.0; 114	18.9; 61	6.1; 12	1.6; 2	2.4; 9	1.2; 5	1.5; 8	0.8; 4	0.9; 2	0.4; 0	1.6; 4	1.3; 2	2.2; 0	3.8
SW Demoscopia/La Séptima	26 Oct–17 Nov	10,000	?	29.3; 117/124	31.9; 129/134	16.4; 51/58	7.3; 10/13		2.8; 11/13	1.3; 3/4	1.3; 7	0.7; 3	1.0; 2	0.4; 1	1.6; 3	1.6; 0/1	2.0; 0	2.6
Sondaxe/La Voz de Galicia	12–16 Nov	1,000	71.9	29.0; 121	27.0; 111	19.4; 71	5.7; 8	1.5; 3	2.4; 11	1.0; 4	2.1; 10	0.7; 3	1.0; 2	0.3; 1	1.1; 3	1.2; 1	3.1; 1	2.0
40dB/Prisa	12–16 Nov	2,000	?	31.8; 126/137	30.6; 118/126	17.5; 55/62	4.2; 5/8	1.2; 3	? 10	? 3	? 7	? 3	? 2	? 1	? 3	1.1; 0/1	1.6; 0	1.2
Sigma Dos/El Mundo	11–16 Nov	3,759	77.1	30.7; 123/129	26.4; 108/114	19.8; 62/67	5.3; 7/9	1.4; 3/5	2.4; 8/9	1.3; 4/5	1.5; 6/8	0.9; 3/4	1.0; 2/3	0.3; 0/1	1.8; 3/5	1.2; 0	–	4.3
EM-Analytics/Electomanía	9–16 Nov	4,446	?	30.8; 127	27.0; 116	18.8; 61	6.1; 12	1.6; 2	2.4; 9	1.2; 5	1.5; 7	0.8; 4	0.9; 2	0.4; 0	1.5; 3	1.3; 2	2.2; 0	3.8
Infortécnica/La Región	26 Oct–16 Nov	1,910	?	? 134/140	? 110/116	? 56/60	? 9/11		–	–	–	–	? 1/2	–	–	–	–	?
SW Demoscopia/La Séptima	26 Oct–16 Nov	9,500	?	29.1; 116/123	31.9; 129/134	16.5; 51/59	7.3; 10/13		2.8; 11/13	1.3; 3/4	1.3; 7	0.8; 3	1.0; 2	0.4; 1	1.6; 3	1.7; 0/1	2.0; 0	2.8
Sondaxe/La Voz de Galicia	11–15 Nov	1,000	70.0	29.7; 125	26.7; 112	18.0; 66	6.4; 9	1.2; 3	2.3; 10	1.0; 3	2.1; 10	0.9; 3	0.9; 2	0.4; 1	1.6; 3	2.1; 2	3.0; 1	3.0
40dB/Prisa	10–15 Nov	2,500	?	31.5; 125/136	30.3; 118/124	18.0; 57/64	4.2; 5/8	1.2; 3	? 10	? 3	? 7	? 3	? 2	? 1	? 3	1.1; 0/1	1.7; 0	1.2
EM-Analytics/Electomanía	9–15 Nov	3,294	?	30.5; 124	26.9; 113	18.9; 65	6.1; 12	1.6; 2	2.4; 9	1.2; 5	1.5; 8	0.8; 4	0.8; 2	0.4; 1	1.5; 3	1.2; 2	2.2; 0	3.6
SW Demoscopia/La Séptima	26 Oct–15 Nov	9,000	?	28.8; 114/121	31.8; 128/134	16.8; 53/61	7.4; 10/13		2.8; 11/13	1.3; 3/4	1.3; 7	0.8; 3	1.0; 2	0.4; 1	1.5; 3	1.7; 0/1	2.0; 0	3.0
SocioMétrica/El Español	1 Sep–15 Nov	5,923	72.6	32.1; 132	27.8; 110	19.1; 67	5.1; 6	0.9; 3	2.5; 9	1.3; 5	1.5; 8	0.8; 4	1.0; 2	0.4; 1	1.6; 3	1.2; 0	2.2; 0	4.3
Sigma Dos/El Mundo	11–14 Nov	3,002	77.0	30.8; 123/129	26.1; 107/113	19.8; 63/68	5.5; 9/10	1.2; 3/5	2.5; 8/9	1.2; 4/5	1.5; 6/8	0.9; 3/4	1.0; 2/3	0.4; 0/1	1.8; 3/5	1.4; 0	–	4.7
Sondaxe/La Voz de Galicia	10–14 Nov	1,000	71.5	30.2; 127	26.7; 109	17.6; 65	7.1; 10	0.9; 2	2.7; 11	1.4; 5	1.8; 8	1.0; 5	1.0; 2	0.4; 1	1.8; 3	2.2; 2	–	3.5
40dB/Prisa	10–14 Nov	2,000	?	31.4; 125/136	29.9; 117/123	18.3; 59/65	4.2; 5/8	1.2; 3	? 10	? 3	? 7	? 3	? 2	? 1	? 3	1.3; 0/1	1.8; 0	1.5
EM-Analytics/Electomanía	9–14 Nov	2,617	?	30.7; 126	26.7; 109	19.0; 65	6.0; 12	1.6; 3	2.5; 10	1.2; 5	1.5; 8	0.8; 4	0.9; 2	0.4; 1	1.4; 3	1.4; 2	2.1; 0	4.0
SW Demoscopia/La Séptima	26 Oct–14 Nov	8,500	?	28.6; 114/120	31.7; 129/134	16.9; 54/61	7.3; 10/13		2.8; 11/13	1.3; 4	1.4; 7	0.8; 3	1.1; 2	0.4; 1	1.5; 3	1.7; 0	2.0; 0	3.1
IMOP/El Confidencial	10–13 Nov	1,000	?	31.5; 128	26.9; 109	19.0; 66	6.9; 11		2.9; 12	1.1; 4	1.7; 8	0.9; 4	1.3; 3	0.5; 1	2.2; 4	0.9; 0	1.6; 0	4.6
40dB/Prisa	10–13 Nov	1,500	?	31.1; 123/134	29.8; 116/123	18.5; 61/67	4.0; 4/8	1.2; 3	? 10	? 3	? 7	? 3	? 2	? 1	? 3	1.3; 0/1	1.6; 0	1.3
InvyMark/laSexta	9–13 Nov	?	?	32.2	28.2	19.1	6.4		–	–	–	–	–	–	–	–	–	4.0
Sondaxe/La Voz de Galicia	9–13 Nov	1,000	71.4	30.8; 130	26.4; 106	18.2; 65	6.9; 10	0.9; 2	2.5; 9	1.3; 6	1.9; 9	1.0; 5	1.0; 2	0.4; 1	1.6; 3	2.2; 2	? 0	4.4
EM-Analytics/Electomanía	9–13 Nov	2,348	?	30.6; 128	26.5; 110	18.8; 62	6.1; 12	1.6; 3	2.4; 9	1.2; 5	1.5; 8	0.8; 4	1.0; 3	0.4; 1	1.3; 3	1.4; 2	2.2; 0	4.1
Sigma Dos/El Mundo	3–13 Nov	5,370	?	31.0; 126/132	25.6; 105/111	19.7; 62/67	6.1; 10/11	1.1; 3/5	2.7; 9/10	1.3; 4/5	1.4; 6/8	0.8; 3/4	1.1; 2/3	0.4; 0/1	1.9; 3/5	1.4; 0	–	5.4
SW Demoscopia/La Séptima	26 Oct–13 Nov	8,000	?	28.5; 113/120	31.7; 129/134	17.1; 55/62	7.3; 10/13		2.8; 11/13	1.3; 4/5	1.4; 7	0.8; 3	1.0; 2	0.4; 1	1.5; 3	1.7; 0	2.0; 0	3.2
Target Point/El Debate	12 Nov	1,013	73.1	30.6; 125/129	27.0; 110/114	18.7; 64/68	7.3; 11		? 13/14	? 3/4	? 7/8	? 3	? 2/3	? 0/1	? 3/4	1.6; 0/1	2.1; 0	3.6
Data10/Okdiario	11–12 Nov	1,500	?	32.0; 133	25.5; 104	20.4; 71	6.7; 9		2.4; 10	1.4; 6	1.3; 7	0.7; 3	0.9; 2	0.4; 1	1.7; 4	2.1; 0	–	6.5
40dB/Prisa	10–12 Nov	1,000	?	31.5; 124/137	29.4; 113/121	18.8; 61/70	4.0; 4/8	1.1; 3	? 10	? 3	? 7	? 3	? 2	? 1	? 3	1.3; 0/1	1.7; 0	2.1
EM-Analytics/Electomanía	9–12 Nov	1,901	?	30.4; 125	26.1; 110	19.0; 65	6.2; 12	1.6; 3	2.4; 9	1.2; 5	1.5; 8	0.8; 4	1.0; 3	0.4; 1	1.2; 3	1.5; 2	2.3; 0	4.3
NC Report/La Razón	6–12 Nov	1,000	64.2	32.5; 137/139	26.1; 102/104	19.0; 66/68	7.6; 11/12		1.9; 7/9	1.6; 7/9	1.4; 7/8	0.8; 4	1.0; 2	0.4; 1	1.8; 3	1.5; 0/1	–	6.4
Sigma Dos/El Mundo	3–12 Nov	4,620	76.9	31.0; 126/132	25.4; 104/109	19.7; 62/69	6.2; 10/11	1.1; 3/4	2.7; 8/9	1.4; 6/7	1.4; 6/8	0.8; 4/5	1.1; 2	0.3; 0/1	2.0; 3/4	1.4; 0	–	5.6
SW Demoscopia/La Séptima	26 Oct–12 Nov	7,500	?	28.7; 114/120	31.6; 128/134	17.1; 55/62	7.3; 10/13		2.7; 11/13	1.3; 4/5	1.4; 7	0.8; 3	1.0; 2	0.4; 1	1.4; 3	1.7; 0	2.1; 0	2.9
EM-Analytics/Electomanía	9–11 Nov	1,475	?	30.2; 125	26.2; 111	19.2; 65	6.1; 12	1.6; 2	2.5; 10	1.2; 5	1.4; 7	0.8; 4	1.0; 3	0.4; 1	1.2; 3	1.6; 2	2.1; 0	4.0
Sigma Dos/El Mundo	3–11 Nov	3,870	76.7	30.8; 126/132	25.3; 103/108	19.6; 63/70	6.2; 10/11	1.1; 3/4	2.7; 8/9	1.4; 6/7	1.4; 6/8	0.8; 4/5	1.1; 2	0.3; 0/1	2.0; 3/4	1.4; 0	–	5.5
SW Demoscopia/La Séptima	26 Oct–11 Nov	7,000	?	28.6; 113/120	31.5; 129/134	17.2; 55/62	7.3; 10/13		2.7; 11/13	1.3; 4	1.4; 7	0.8; 3	1.0; 2	0.4; 1	1.4; 3	1.7; 0	2.0; 0	2.9
SW Demoscopia/La Séptima	26 Oct–10 Nov	6,500	?	28.3; 112/118	31.4; 128/134	17.5; 57/64	7.4; 10/13		2.7; 11/14	1.2; 3/5	1.4; 6/7	0.8; 3	1.0; 2	0.4; 1	1.4; 2/3	1.7; 0	2.0; 0	3.1
SW Demoscopia/La Séptima	26 Oct–9 Nov	6,000	?	28.5; 113/119	31.2; 127/132	17.5; 58/65	7.5; 11/14		2.6; 10/12	1.3; 3/5	1.4; 7	0.8; 2/3	1.0; 2	0.4; 1	1.4; 2/3	1.7; 0	2.0; 0	2.7
Winston/Artículo14	5–8 Nov	1,501	?	31.1; 134	26.4; 109	18.7; 64	8.4; 17		2.3; 8	1.1; 3	1.1; 5	1.0; 3	1.0; 2	0.0; 0	1.9; 5	1.6; 0	2.5; 0	4.7
EM-Analytics/Electomanía	1–8 Nov	2,531	?	30.5; 127	25.9; 110	19.0; 65	6.2; 12	1.5; 2	2.4; 9	1.2; 5	1.4; 8	0.9; 4	1.0; 2	0.4; 1	1.1; 3	1.7; 2	2.0; 0	4.6
SW Demoscopia/La Séptima	26 Oct–8 Nov	5,500	?	28.5; 113/120	31.1; 127/132	17.3; 57/64	7.6; 11/14		2.6; 10/12	1.3; 3/5	1.4; 7	0.8; 2/3	1.0; 2	0.4; 1	1.4; 3	1.7; 0	2.0; 0	2.6
SocioMétrica/El Español	1 Sep–8 Nov	5,460	?	32.3; 136	27.7; 108	18.9; 66	5.0; 6	0.9; 2	2.4; 9	1.4; 6	1.6; 8	0.8; 3	1.0; 2	0.5; 1	1.7; 3	1.2; 0	2.2; 0	4.6
SW Demoscopia/La Séptima	26 Oct–7 Nov	5,000	?	28.7; 114/121	31.0; 126/132	17.3; 58/64	7.6; 11/14		2.5; 9/12	1.2; 3/5	1.4; 7	0.8; 2/3	0.9; 2	0.4; 1	1.4; 2/3	1.7; 0	2.1; 0	2.3
DYM/Henneo	4–6 Nov	1,025	?	33.1; 135/139	27.3; 104/108	18.6; 63/66	5.6; 8/10		–	–	–	–	–	–	–	1.9; 1/2	0.4; 0	5.8
IMOP/El Confidencial	2–6 Nov	1,000	?	29.8; 126	25.9; 106	19.9; 70	8.1; 13		2.6; 11	1.2; 4	1.6; 7	0.7; 4	1.3; 3	0.5; 1	1.8; 4	1.2; 1	1.7; 0	3.9
EM-Analytics/Electomanía	1–6 Nov	1,860	?	31.1; 131	25.3; 108	19.2; 66	6.1; 12	1.5; 3	2.2; 8	1.2; 5	1.4; 8	0.9; 4	0.9; 2	0.3; 0	1.0; 2	1.8; 1	1.9; 0	5.8
Sigma Dos/El Mundo	30 Oct–6 Nov	4,172	?	31.0; 131/137	25.2; 101/106	19.4; 62/70	6.9; 10/12	1.2; 3/4	2.9; 8/9	1.2; 5/6	1.3; 6/8	0.9; 4/6	1.0; 2	0.4; 0/1	1.6; 3/4	1.6; 0	–	5.8
SW Demoscopia/La Séptima	26 Oct–6 Nov	4,500	?	28.8; 115/122	30.8; 126/132	17.2; 57/64	7.7; 11/14		2.5; 9/12	1.2; 3/5	1.3; 6/7	0.8; 3	0.9; 2	0.4; 1	1.5; 3	1.8; 0	2.1; 0	2.0
GAD3/Vocento	3–5 Nov	1,502	?	31.9; 136	25.9; 103	18.6; 63	6.0; 7	1.5; 5	2.7; 12	1.4; 5	1.5; 8	0.9; 4	0.9; 2	0.4; 1	1.6; 3	1.4; 1	1.3; 0	6.0
Ateneo del Dato/elDiario.es	2–5 Nov	2,000	?	31.5; 123/133	28.6; 108/116	18.6; 61/69	6.1; 9/11		–	–	–	–	–	–	–	1.5; 0	–	2.9
NC Report/La Razón	2–5 Nov	1,000	64.3	33.0; 138/140	25.6; 99/101	19.3; 67/69	6.9; 9/10		2.0; 7/8	1.8; 8/9	1.4; 6/7	0.9; 4/5	0.8; 2	0.4; 1	1.2; 2/3	2.4; 0/1	–	7.4
SW Demoscopia/La Séptima	26 Oct–5 Nov	4,000	?	28.5; 114/120	31.0; 126/132	17.2; 56/63	7.6; 11/14		2.6; 10/12	1.2; 3/5	1.3; 6/7	0.8; 3/4	0.9; 2	0.4; 1	1.5; 3	1.2; 0	2.0; 0	2.5
40dB/Prisa	2–4 Nov	2,000	?	31.9; 126/139	29.9; 115/123	18.0; 58/64	3.9; 4/8	1.1; 3	? 10	? 3	? 7	? 3	? 2	? 1	? 3	1.2; 0/1	2.0; 0	2.0
Sondaxe/La Voz de Galicia	2–4 Nov	1,200	?	29.7	27.3	18.6	7.1		2.9	1.4	1.5	0.7	0.9	0.5	2.3	2.2	1.6	2.4
EM-Analytics/Electomanía	1–4 Nov	1,422	?	31.3; 133	25.5; 108	19.2; 64	6.1; 12	1.5; 3	2.1; 8	1.2; 5	1.4; 7	0.9; 5	0.9; 2	0.3; 0	1.0; 2	1.8; 1	1.8; 0	5.8
SW Demoscopia/La Séptima	26 Oct–4 Nov	3,500	?	28.8; 116/122	30.9; 125/131	17.0; 56/63	7.6; 11/14		2.6; 10/12	1.2; 3/5	1.4; 6/7	0.8; 3/4	0.9; 2	0.4; 1	1.4; 2/3	1.2; 0	2.0; 0	2.1
Data10/Okdiario	2–3 Nov	1,500	68.7	32.7; 136	24.7; 97	19.8; 69	6.9; 14		2.3; 7	1.5; 6	1.3; 7	0.7; 4	1.0; 2	0.4; 1	1.3; 3	3.1; 2	1.5; 0	8.0
Celeste-Tel/Onda Cero	29 Oct–3 Nov	1,100	65.5	31.8; 138	25.7; 101	19.2; 66	6.8; 10	1.2; 3	2.2; 8	1.5; 6	1.4; 7	0.9; 4	0.8; 2	0.5; 1	1.2; 3	1.9; 1	1.6; 0	6.1
YouGov/Ara	26 Oct–2 Nov	1,221	?	29.6; 112/130	25.9; 96/113	20.3; 64/80	9.2; 12/25		2.9; 10/15	1.3; 3/6	1.1; 5/9	0.7; 2/5	? 2	? 1	1.8; 2/4	1.8; 0/1	–	3.7
SocioMétrica/El Español	1 Sep–1 Nov	4,893	?	32.7; 139	26.6; 106	19.1; 64	5.2; 7	0.9; 3	2.5; 9	1.4; 6	1.4; 7	0.8; 4	0.9; 2	0.5; 1	1.4; 2	1.7; 0	2.5; 0	6.1
Sigma Dos/El Mundo	29–30 Oct	2,505	?	31.1; 133/139	24.6; 97/103	19.3; 63/69	7.5; 9/12	0.9; 2/3	3.0; 9/11	1.1; 6	1.3; 7/8	0.9; 5/6	1.0; 2	0.4; 0/1	1.4; 3/4	1.9; 0/1	–	6.5
Target Point/El Debate	28–30 Oct	1,024	71.9	31.8; 131/135	25.5; 99/103	19.9; 68/72	6.6; 9/11		–	–	–	–	–	–	–	2.4; 1	2.6; 0	6.3
EM-Analytics/Electomanía	28–30 Oct	1,527	?	31.5; 133	25.8; 108	19.2; 64	6.2; 12	1.4; 2	2.2; 8	1.2; 5	1.4; 7	0.9; 6	1.0; 2	0.3; 0	1.0; 2	1.7; 1	1.6; 0	5.7
CIS (Descifrando la Guerra) (Note: Alternative projection based on raw CIS data.)	7–30 Oct	45,074	?	27.2; 106/112	29.6; 117/127	20.6; 72/81	5.2; 9	1.5; 3/4	2.9; 11	1.1; 3	1.6; 7	0.8; 4	0.7; 2	–	1.2; 2/3	1.1; 0/1	–	2.4
CIS (Target Point)	7–30 Oct	45,074	?	? 125	? 112	? 74	? 11		–	–	–	–	–	–	–	–	–	?
CIS (Opina 360)	7–30 Oct	45,074	?	27.7; 111	29.9; 121	20.5; 75	6.4; 10		–	–	–	–	–	–	–	1.1; 0	1.6; 0	2.2
CIS (Ateneo del Dato)	7–30 Oct	45,074	?	27.6; 103/117	30.1; 113/133	21.7; 72/84	6.3; 6/8		3.0; 13	1.1; 3	1.6; 7/8	0.9; 3/4	0.9; 2	–	–	1.1; 0	1.7; 0	2.5
CIS	7–30 Oct	45,074	?	25.5; 98/106	33.3; 134/143	18.4; 57/65	5.3; 7/14	1.6; 4/6	3.1; 10/14	1.2; 2/4	1.8; 7/10	0.7; 2/4	1.0; 2/3	0.2; 0	1.5; 3/4	1.1; 0/1	1.4; 0	7.8
NC Report/La Razón	26–29 Oct	1,000	64.3	33.0; 140/142	25.6; 100/102	19.3; 66/68	6.9; 9/10		2.0; 7/8	1.8; 8/9	1.4; 6/7	0.9; 4/5	0.8; 2	0.4; 1	1.2; 2/3	2.4; 0/1	–	7.4
Sondaxe/La Voz de Galicia	26–28 Oct	1,200	77.2	29.2	26.9	19.2	7.2		2.6	1.3	1.4	0.9	0.9	0.3	2.0	2.0	2.4	2.3
Hamalgama Métrica/Vozpópuli	22–28 Oct	1,000	?	32.4; 137	26.4; 106	19.9; 70	5.4; 7		1.9; 7	1.7; 7	1.3; 7	0.9; 4	0.8; 2	–	1.1; 2	2.2; 1	1.8; 0	5.6
Vox/The Objective	27 Oct	1,500	?	28.1; 114/118	29.6; 117/121	20.2; 67/71	6.2; 12/14		? 8	? 5	? 6/7	? 3/4	? 1/2	? 0/1	? 2	1.9; 1	1.1; 0	1.5
PSOE	25 Oct	?	?	29.0	30.0	20.0	–	–	–	–	–	–	–	–	–	–	–	1.0
More in Common	21–25 Oct	2,210	70.0	28.3	27.6	20.8	7.8		–	–	–	–	–	–	–	2.6	2.4	0.7
SocioMétrica/El Español	1 Sep–25 Oct	3,223	?	32.4; 137	27.0; 108	18.6; 63	5.2; 7	0.9; 3	2.6; 9	1.7; 7	1.3; 7	0.8; 4	0.9; 2	0.4; 1	1.2; 2	1.8; 0	2.4; 0	5.4
NC Report/La Razón	22–24 Oct	1,000	63.5	33.1; 142/144	25.8; 100/102	19.0; 64/66	6.6; 8/9		2.0; 7/8	1.8; 8/9	1.4; 6/7	0.9; 4/5	0.8; 1/2	0.4; 1	1.3; 3	2.6; 1	–	7.3
Winston/Artículo14	21–23 Oct	1,200	?	29.4; 122	27.1; 115	19.2; 69	5.6; 12		? 11	? 4	? 7	? 3	? 1	? 1	? 3	? 2	? 0	2.3
EM-Analytics/Electomanía	17–23 Oct	4,309	?	30.9; 132	26.7; 111	19.0; 62	5.8; 11	1.2; 2	2.2; 8	1.3; 5	1.4; 7	1.0; 6	1.0; 3	0.3; 0	1.1; 2	1.7; 1	1.7; 0	4.2
Ateneo del Dato/elDiario.es	20–22 Oct	2,000	?	31.1; 119/134	27.6; 102/117	19.8; 64/77	6.8; 11/17		–	–	–	–	–	–	–	2.7; 0/3	–	3.5
Sigma Dos/El Mundo	8–22 Oct	3,122	?	30.6; 125/131	26.1; 103/109	19.9; 66/69	7.4; 10/12	0.8; 2/3	2.5; 8/9	1.2; 6/7	1.2; 7/8	0.9; 4/5	0.9; 2	0.4; 0/1	1.0; 2/3	2.8; 1	–	4.5
EM-Analytics/Electomanía	15–17 Oct	3,141	?	31.8; 134	27.1; 111	18.9; 62	4.9; 7	1.3; 3	2.1; 8	1.2; 5	1.4; 7	1.0; 6	1.0; 3	0.3; 0	1.1; 3	2.0; 1	1.7; 0	4.7
IMOP/El Confidencial	13–16 Oct	1,000	72.9	28.5; 123	27.1; 113	20.0; 72	8.9; 14		2.2; 8	1.2; 4	1.3; 6	1.0; 5	1.1; 2	0.6; 1	? 1	1.9; 1	1.2; 0	1.4
Sigma Dos/El Mundo	1–14 Oct	3,007	?	31.5; 132/137	25.3; 101/106	19.5; 65/68	7.2; 9/10	0.9; 3/4	2.5; 9	1.2; 6/7	1.2; 6/7	0.9; 5/6	0.8; 2	0.5; 1	0.8; 1/2	2.8; 1	–	6.2

===== 2026 (Jan–Oct) =====
Polling firm/Commissioner	Fieldwork date	Sample size	Turnout	PP	PSOE	Vox	Sumar	ERC	Junts	EH Bildu	PNV	BNG	CCa	UPN	Adelante Andalucía (2021)	Podemos	SALF	Aliança.cat	Lead
SocioMétrica/El Español	10–11 Oct	1,000	?	32.6; 141	26.2; 104	18.8; 64	5.8; 8	2.0; 8	1.5; 6	1.3; 7	0.8; 4	0.9; 2	0.5; 1	0.2; 1	0.9; 1	2.8; 2	2.1; 0	–	6.4
Target Point/El Debate	6–9 Oct	1,002	67.6	32.0; 135/137	25.9; 103/105	18.7; 64/66	6.9; 10	? 8/10	? 5/6	? 7	? 5/6	? 2/3	? 1	? 1	? 2	3.4; 2	1.3; 0	–	6.1
EM-Analytics/Electomanía	5–9 Oct	4,125	?	31.5; 131	26.9; 107	19.1; 67	6.0; 11	2.0; 8	1.1; 4	1.4; 7	1.1; 6	1.0; 3	0.3; 0	0.2; 1	1.1; 3	3.4; 2	1.7; 0	–	4.6
40dB/Prisa	7–8 Oct	800	?	31.9; 123/140	28.1; 105/117	18.9; 63/74	5.3; 5/7	? 8	? 7	? 7	? 6	? 2	? 1	? 1	? 1	2.3; 2	1.8; 0	–	3.8
GESOP/Prensa Ibérica	6–8 Oct	1,000	?	28.7; 121/125	26.1; 108/112	18.9; 68/72	8.0; 14/17	2.5; 9/11	1.9; 4/6	–	–	–	–	–	–	2.6; 2	2.0; 0/1	–	2.6
GAD3/Vocento	6–8 Oct	1,077	?	31.4; 133	26.4; 107	18.2; 65	7.4; 10	2.6; 10	1.5; 5	1.5; 8	1.0; 6	0.9; 2	0.4; 1	0.1; 0	1.0; 1	2.3; 2	1.8; 0	–	5.0
Hamalgama Métrica/Vozpópuli	5–8 Oct	1,000	64.0	33.4; 144	25.3; 103	19.6; 68	5.4; 5	1.9; 7	1.7; 7	1.3; 6	0.9; 4	0.8; 2	0.5; 1	0.2; 1	–	3.3; 2	1.8; 0	–	8.1
InvyMark/laSexta	5–8 Oct	?	?	32.8	28.0	18.8	6.3	1.9	1.2	1.5	1.1	–	–	–	–	3.2	1.8	–	4.8
Sigma Dos/El Mundo	1–8 Oct	2,017	?	31.9; 135	25.3; 103	19.1; 68	7.6; 9	2.6; 9	1.2; 7	1.1; 6	0.9; 6	0.9; 2	0.5; 1	0.2; 1	0.8; 2	3.1; 2	–	–	6.6
IMOP/El Confidencial	5–7 Oct	900	?	30.4; 130	26.5; 110	19.0; 70	7.6; 11	2.2; 8	1.1; 4	1.3; 6	0.9; 4	1.1; 3	0.6; 1	0.2; 1	1.0; 1	2.3; 1	1.9; 0	–	3.9
DYM/Henneo	5–7 Oct	1,011	?	34.0; 139/143	28.2; 107/111	18.2; 61/65	3.6; 3/5	–	–	–	–	–	–	–	–	3.6; 1/2	0.5; 0	–	5.8
CIS (Target Point)	1–6 Oct	5,025	?	30.8; 132	27.6; 117	18.1; 65	6.2; 9	2.3; 9	1.0; 3	1.3; 6	0.8; 3	0.7; 2	–	–	–	2.6; 2	2.1; 0	–	3.2
CIS (Opina 360)	1–6 Oct	5,025	?	28.0; 119	28.0; 118	17.8; 67	7.3; 13	–	–	–	–	–	–	–	–	3.5; 1	1.6; 0	–	Tie
CIS (Ateneo del Dato)	1–6 Oct	5,025	?	28.3; 119	28.6; 116	17.5; 66	7.9; 15	–	–	–	–	–	–	–	–	3.0; 2	2.4; 0	–	0.3
CIS	1–6 Oct	5,025	?	22.2	34.0	17.1	6.1	3.0	1.1	1.6	0.6	0.9	0.2	0.1	–	3.1	1.8	–	11.8
NC Report/La Razón	1–6 Oct	1,000	63.1	34.1; 146/148	25.0; 98/102	18.2; 61/64	5.3; 6/8	1.8; 6/7	2.9; 10/11	1.4; 6	0.9; 4/5	0.7; 1/2	0.4; 1	0.2; 1	–	3.9; 2/4	–	–	9.1
SocioMétrica/PP	5 Oct	?	?	? 144	? 106	? 62	–	–	–	–	–	–	–	–	–	–	–	–	?
PSOE	5 Oct	7,000	?	? 126	? 129	? 71	–	–	–	–	–	–	–	–	–	–	–	–	?
EM-Analytics/Electomanía	2–3 Oct	8,171	?	31.3; 129	26.9; 106	19.4; 69	6.3; 12	2.0; 8	1.1; 4	1.4; 7	1.1; 6	1.0; 2	0.3; 0	0.2; 1	1.1; 3	3.4; 3	1.7; 0	–	4.4
SocioMétrica/El Español	1–3 Oct	1,000	?	33.4; 143	26.5; 106	18.1; 62	5.3; 6	2.2; 8	1.2; 5	1.3; 7	1.0; 6	0.9; 2	0.6; 1	0.2; 1	? 1	3.1; 2	2.2; 0	–	6.9
Data10/Okdiario	2 Oct	1,000	?	34.0; 139	26.1; 110	18.6; 64	5.2; 5	1.9; 7	1.5; 6	1.4; 8	0.8; 4	1.0; 2	0.3; 0	0.2; 1	0.5; 0	4.3; 4	1.4; 0	–	7.9
Winston/Artículo14	29 Sep–1 Oct	1,201	?	31.3; 135	24.9; 102	19.1; 69	6.8; 10	? 8	? 6	? 6	? 6	? 2	? 1	? 1	–	3.9; 4	? 0	–	6.4
Ateneo del Dato/elDiario.es	29 Sep–1 Oct	1,500	?	33.2; 129/141	27.5; 102/109	19.2; 62/71	7.0; 10/14	–	–	–	–	–	–	–	–	3.3; 2	–	–	5.7
Sigma Dos/El Mundo	22 Sep–1 Oct	2,116	?	32.6; 140	25.6; 103	18.3; 63	6.6; 9	2.5; 8	1.1; 4	1.3; 6	1.0; 6	0.9; 2	0.5; 1	0.2; 1	0.8; 2	3.3; 2	–	1.0; 3	7.0
40dB/Prisa	25–28 Sep	2,000	?	31.6	27.4	18.4	5.6	–	–	–	–	–	–	–	–	2.7	2.0	–	4.2
SocioMétrica/El Español	24–26 Sep	1,200	?	33.9; 145	25.7; 107	18.0; 62	5.7; 5	2.0; 8	1.2; 4	1.4; 7	0.9; 4	1.0; 2	0.6; 1	0.2; 1	1.0; 2	3.3; 2	2.0; 0	–	8.2
EM-Analytics/Electomanía	15–25 Sep	1,104	?	32.3; 134	25.3; 101	18.8; 67	6.5; 11	2.0; 8	1.2; 4	1.4; 7	1.1; 6	0.9; 2	0.4; 1	0.2; 1	0.9; 3	3.8; 5	2.0; 0	–	7.0
Celeste-Tel/Onda Cero	16–21 Sep	1,100	64.6	33.9; 147	25.4; 101	17.8; 62	6.4; 9	2.0; 7	1.5; 6	1.4; 6	1.1; 5	0.8; 2	0.5; 1	0.2; 1	–	3.3; 3	1.7; 0	–	8.5
DYM/Henneo	16–21 Sep	1,017	?	34.7; 144/148	26.3; 102/105	17.3; 58/61	4.5; 6/7	–	–	–	–	–	–	–	–	3.7; 2/3	1.0; 0	–	8.4
EM-Analytics/Electomanía	1–18 Sep	1,399	?	32.1; 131	25.6; 102	19.1; 68	6.8; 14	1.9; 8	1.2; 5	1.4; 7	1.1; 6	0.9; 2	0.4; 1	0.2; 1	0.9; 3	3.3; 2	2.0; 0	–	6.5
InvyMark/laSexta	7–11 Sep	1,200	?	33.7	26.8	18.6	6.1	–	–	–	–	–	–	–	–	3.3	1.8	–	6.9
Target Point/El Debate	9–10 Sep	1,012	66	31.5; 135/136	25.6; 106/107	18.9; 66/67	6.9; 10	–	? 3/4	–	–	–	–	–	–	2.8; 2	2.5; 0	–	5.9
EM-Analytics/Electomanía	1–10 Sep	1,190	?	32.2; 132	25.4; 102	19.2; 68	6.9; 13	1.9; 8	1.1; 4	1.4; 7	1.1; 6	0.9; 2	0.4; 1	0.2; 1	0.9; 3	3.4; 3	2.0; 0	–	6.8
Hamalgama Métrica/Vozpópuli	1–8 Sep	1,000	?	33.6; 145	25.1; 101	19.3; 67	5.6; 7	1.9; 8	1.4; 5	1.3; 6	0.9; 4	0.8; 2	0.5; 1	0.2; 1	–	3.8; 3	1.6; 0	–	8.5
CIS (Target Point)	1–4 Sep	4,042	?	31.9; 139	26.8; 113	17.8; 61	6.0; 8	1.7 ?	–	–	–	–	–	–	–	3.5; 2	<2.0; 0	–	5.1
CIS (Ateneo del Dato)	1–4 Sep	4,042	?	29.5; 127	27.6; 112	17.6; 65	6.8; 12	–	–	–	–	–	–	–	–	3.9; 2	1.8; 0	–	1.9
CIS	1–4 Sep	4,042	?	25.5	31.0	16.6	5.7	2.5	0.7	1.3	0.7	0.7	0.2	0.1	–	3.7	1.8	–	5.5
NC Report/La Razón	1–3 Sep	1,000	62.3	34.5; 147/149	24.9; 98/100	18.3; 62/64	5.7; 7/9	2.0; 7	1.6; 6	1.4; 6	1.0; 5	0.8; 2	0.4; 1	0.2; 1	–	3.4; 2/3	–	–	9.6
GAD3/ABC	1–3 Sep	1,010	?	31.1; 133	26.1; 105	19.2; 69	7.0; 9	2.3; 10	1.2; 4	1.5; 7	0.9; 6	0.9; 2	0.3; 1	0.2; 1	1.0; 1	3.1; 2	1.5; 0	–	5.0
EM-Analytics/Electomanía	15 Aug–3 Sep	1,284	?	32.0; 131	25.6; 102	19.2; 68	6.7; 12	1.9; 8	1.1; 4	1.4; 7	1.1; 6	1.0; 2	0.4; 1	0.2; 1	1.0; 3	3.6; 5	1.8; 0	–	6.4
40dB/Prisa	31 Aug–2 Sep	2,000	?	32.4	27.6	17.8	5.7	–	–	–	–	–	–	–	–	2.8	2.2	–	4.8
More in Common	24–28 Aug	2,144	68.1	28.7	27.0	20.3	6.6	–	–	–	–	–	–	–	–	3.6	2.3	–	1.7
EM-Analytics/Electomanía	15 Jul–28 Aug	1,197	?	32.3; 132	25.7; 102	19.0; 66	6.4; 12	1.9; 8	1.1; 4	1.4; 7	1.1; 6	1.0; 3	0.4; 1	0.2; 1	1.0; 3	3.6; 5	2.0; 0	–	6.6
Data10/Okdiario	26–27 Aug	1,500	?	34.3; 145	25.4; 100	18.1; 63	6.3; 8	2.0; 8	1.4; 6	1.4; 8	0.9; 4	0.9; 2	0.5; 1	0.2; 1	0.7; 1	3.6; 3	–	–	8.9
Sigma Dos/El Mundo	20–26 Aug	2,173	?	33.1; 143	25.4; 101	17.9; 61	6.6; 10	2.4; 8	1.1; 4	1.2; 6	1.0; 6	0.8; 2	0.5; 1	0.2; 1	0.8; 2	2.8; 1	–	1.0; 4	7.7
Cluster17/Agenda Pública	22–25 Aug	1,637	?	30.1	28.1	16.1	6.1	2.0	1.6	1.3	1.1	–	–	–	–	3.6	1.7	1.6	2.0
EM-Analytics/Electomanía	1 Jul–21 Aug	1,211	?	32.0; 131	26.1; 103	19.0; 68	6.4; 11	1.9; 8	1.1; 4	1.4; 7	1.2; 6	1.0; 2	0.4; 1	0.2; 1	1.0; 3	3.5; 5	2.0; 0	–	5.9
EM-Analytics/Electomanía	1 Jul–12 Aug	1,428	?	31.8; 130	26.2; 102	19.2; 69	6.5; 12	1.9; 8	1.1; 4	1.5; 7	1.2; 6	1.0; 2	0.4; 1	0.2; 1	1.0; 3	3.7; 5	1.8; 0	–	5.6
EM-Analytics/Electomanía	30 Jun–7 Aug	1,227	?	32.1; 130	26.2; 103	19.1; 69	6.2; 11	2.0; 8	1.0; 3	1.5; 7	1.2; 6	0.9; 2	0.4; 1	0.2; 1	1.0; 4	3.9; 5	1.9; 0	–	5.9
SocioMétrica/El Español	5–6 Aug	1,690	?	33.8; 149	26.0; 103	17.0; 57	5.9; 7	2.1; 8	1.5; 6	1.5; 7	1.1; 6	0.9; 2	0.5; 1	0.2; 1	1.0; 1	2.7; 2	2.3; 0	–	7.8
NC Report/La Razón	31 Jul–4 Aug	1,000	62.6	34.2; 145/147	25.2; 101/103	18.0; 61/63	5.9; 8/10	2.0; 7	1.6; 6	1.4; 6	1.0; 5	0.8; 2	0.4; 1	0.2; 1	–	3.5; 2/3	–	–	9.0
EM-Analytics/Electomanía	30 Jun–1 Aug	910	?	32.5; 134	27.2; 105	18.6; 65	5.9; 10	2.0; 8	1.0; 3	1.5; 7	1.2; 6	0.9; 2	0.4; 1	0.2; 1	1.0; 3	3.7; 5	2.0; 0	–	5.3
EM-Analytics/Electomanía	30 Jun–24 Jul	1,099	?	32.5; 136	27.0; 106	18.3; 63	5.9; 10	2.0; 8	1.0; 3	1.5; 7	1.2; 6	0.9; 2	0.4; 1	0.2; 1	1.0; 3	3.5; 4	2.0; 0	–	5.5
DYM/Henneo	15–20 Jul	1,014	?	34.9; 145/149	27.0; 104/108	16.5; 55/57	3.8; 5/6	–	–	–	–	–	–	–	–	4.1; 3/4	1.0; 0	–	7.9
Sigma Dos/El Mundo	6–20 Jul	3,690	?	32.8; 138/143	26.1; 104/109	17.3; 58/61	7.4; 11/12	2.3; 8	1.1; 4/5	1.3; 6/7	1.0; 5/6	0.8; 1/2	0.5; 1	0.2; 1	1.0; 1/2	3.0; 1	–	1.0; 4/5	6.7
KeyData/Público	17 Jul	?	69.1	32.5; 140	26.3; 106	17.8; 62	6.6; 10	2.0; 8	1.2; 5	1.3; 6	1.0; 6	0.8; 2	? 1	? 1	–	3.6; 2	1.5; 0	–	6.2
Target Point/El Debate	15–17 Jul	1,004	66	32.1; 141/143	26.1; 106/108	17.6; 60/62	6.1; 8	? 7	? 5	? 7	? 6	? 2	? 1	? 1	? 1	2.7; 2	2.4; 0	–	6.0
EM-Analytics/Electomanía	20 Jun–17 Jul	1,401	?	32.5; 135	27.5; 108	18.3; 62	6.1; 11	2.0; 8	1.1; 4	1.5; 7	1.2; 6	0.9; 2	0.4; 1	0.2; 1	1.0; 3	3.3; 2	2.0; 0	–	5.0
EM-Analytics/Electomanía	20 Jun–10 Jul	1,304	?	32.8; 136	27.1; 104	18.5; 63	6.0; 10	1.9; 8	1.3; 5	1.5; 7	1.2; 6	1.0; 2	0.4; 1	0.2; 1	1.0; 3	3.5; 4	1.8; 0	–	5.7
ODEC/Mediaflows–UV	9 Jul	2,005	?	29.5; 121	27.0; 107	19.2; 73	7.2; 11	2.6; 12	1.5; 5	1.9; 8	1.0; 5	0.7; 2	0.9; 2	0.2; 1	–	3.7; 3	1.6; 0	–	2.5
GESOP/Prensa Ibérica	6–9 Jul	1,001	?	29.4; 123/127	26.5; 108/112	17.8; 64/68	7.7; 14/16	2.3; 11/12	1.0; 3/4	–	–	–	–	–	–	4.0; 4	2.0; 0	–	2.9
CIS (Sondaxe)	1–6 Jul	4,020	?	28.7	27.2	17.2	5.9	1.8	0.9	1.0	0.7	0.5	0.2	0.1	–	2.3	2.8	–	1.5
CIS (Target Point)	1–6 Jul	4,020	?	32.3; 141	26.6; 112	16.3; 56	7.4; 11	1.8 ?	1.2 ?	1.2 ?	0.9 ?	0.5 ?	–	–	–	2.7; 2	2.8; 0	–	5.7
CIS (Ateneo del Dato)	1–6 Jul	4,020	?	30.5; 135	27.9; 114	16.2; 54	7.4; 14	–	–	–	–	–	–	–	–	2.9; 1	2.0; 0	–	2.6
CIS	1–6 Jul	4,020	?	25.1	33.0	15.3	6.1	2.7	0.7	0.8	1.0	0.9	0.2	0.2	–	2.5	2.6	–	7.9
Hamalgama Métrica/Vozpópuli	30 Jun–6 Jul	1,000	?	33.8; 146	25.9; 104	18.8; 63	5.9; 7	1.8; 7	1.5; 6	1.3; 6	0.9; 4	0.8; 2	0.5; 1	0.2; 1	–	3.8; 3	1.6; 0	–	7.9
SocioMétrica/El Español	2–4 Jul	1,416	?	33.6; 147	25.7; 103	16.9; 58	6.0; 8	2.3; 9	1.4; 6	1.5; 7	1.0; 5	0.8; 2	0.5; 1	0.2; 1	1.0; 1	2.8; 2	2.2; 0	–	7.9
EM-Analytics/Electomanía	12 Jun–3 Jul	2,237	?	33.0; 136	27.1; 104	18.3; 62	5.9; 10	1.9; 7	1.4; 6	1.5; 7	1.2; 6	0.9; 2	0.4; 1	0.2; 1	1.0; 3	3.6; 5	1.8; 0	–	5.9
NC Report/La Razón	25 Jun–1 Jul	1,000	62.8	34.5; 146/148	25.0; 99/100	17.8; 60/62	6.1; 8/10	2.0; 7	1.6; 6	1.4; 6	1.0; 5	0.8; 2	0.4; 1	0.2; 1	–	3.6; 2/3	–	–	9.5
CIS (Demócrata)	22–30 Jun	6,019	70	32.3; 132	30.4; 121	18.1; 62	7.1; 9	? 6	? 5	? 6	? 4	? 1	? 1	? 1	–	2.7; 2	–	–	1.9
CIS (Demócrata)	22–30 Jun	6,019	67	32.5; 133	30.0; 120	18.5; 62	7.0; 8	? 7	? 5	? 6	? 4	? 1	? 1	? 1	–	2.5; 2	–	–	2.5
40dB/Prisa	26–29 Jun	2,000	?	32.0	28.0	17.2	5.8	–	–	–	–	–	–	–	–	3.1	2.1	–	4.0
Ipsos/La Vanguardia	16–29 Jun	1,306	?	31.2; 132	27.1; 111	18.5; 64	7.6; 12	2.0; 8	0.9; 3	1.8; 8	1.3; 6	0.6; 2	0.5; 1	0.0; 0	–	1.8; 0	1.9; 0	0.9; 3	4.1
More in Common	24–28 Jun	2,277	67.7	31.3	25.7	17.1	8.2	–	–	–	–	–	–	–	–	3.3	2.2	–	5.6
InvyMark/laSexta	22–26 Jun	?	?	33.5	27.3	17.5	5.7	–	–	–	–	–	–	–	–	3.5	1.7	–	6.2
EM-Analytics/Electomanía	12–26 Jun	1,844	?	33.0; 136	26.8; 103	18.2; 62	5.9; 10	1.9; 8	1.4; 6	1.5; 7	1.2; 6	0.9; 2	0.4; 1	0.2; 1	1.0; 3	3.6; 5	1.8; 0	–	6.2
EM-Analytics/Electomanía	12–19 Jun	1,472	?	33.0; 136	27.1; 105	18.1; 61	5.9; 10	1.9; 8	1.4; 6	1.5; 7	1.2; 6	0.9; 2	0.4; 1	0.2; 1	1.0; 3	3.6; 4	1.8; 0	–	5.9
Target Point/El Debate	17–18 Jun	1,022	66	32.0; 139/141	25.6; 105/107	18.1; 61/63	7.2; 10/11	? 8/9	? 4/5	? 6/7	? 5/6	? 1/2	? 1	? 1	? 1	3.2; 2/3	2.2; 0	–	6.4
EM-Analytics/Electomanía	5–12 Jun	1,297	?	32.8; 135	27.7; 106	18.2; 60	5.9; 10	1.9; 8	1.5; 7	1.4; 7	1.2; 6	0.9; 2	0.4; 1	0.2; 1	1.1; 3	3.6; 4	1.8; 0	–	5.1
Sigma Dos/El Mundo	1–11 Jun	1,994	?	32.6; 140	26.4; 108	17.2; 60	7.0; 10	2.0; 8	0.8; 3	1.0; 6	0.9; 6	0.8; 2	0.5; 1	0.2; 1	0.7; 1	3.4; 2	–	0.8; 2	6.2
EM-Analytics/Electomanía	24 May–5 Jun	1,691	?	32.4; 133	28.2; 109	18.3; 60	5.9; 10	1.8; 7	1.5; 7	1.3; 6	1.2; 6	0.9; 2	0.4; 1	0.2; 1	1.0; 3	3.6; 5	1.9; 0	–	4.2
CIS (Ateneo del Dato)	1–4 Jun	4,024	?	31.2; 135	28.1; 114	16.3; 54	7.2; 12	–	–	–	–	–	–	–	–	2.8; 0	1.7; 0	–	3.1
CIS	1–4 Jun	4,024	?	27.1	31.3	15.8	6.4	1.9	1.0	1.2	0.6	1.0	0.2	0.1	–	2.8	1.9	–	4.2
40dB/Prisa	28 May–1 Jun	2,000	?	32.4	27.7	17.4	6.2	–	–	–	–	–	–	–	–	2.3	2.1	–	4.7
SocioMétrica/El Español	28–30 May	1,200	?	33.9; 147	25.9; 105	17.4; 60	5.7; 6	2.1; 8	1.2; 5	1.5; 7	1.0; 5	0.8; 2	0.5; 1	0.2; 1	1.1; 2	2.2; 1	2.5; 0	–	8.0
InvyMark/laSexta	25–29 May	1,200	?	33.1	27.8	17.6	5.5	–	–	–	–	–	–	–	–	3.6	1.7	–	5.3
EM-Analytics/Electomanía	24–29 May	1,160	?	32.2; 131	28.8; 114	18.5; 58	5.8; 9	1.8; 7	1.5; 7	1.3; 6	1.2; 6	0.9; 2	0.4; 1	0.2; 1	1.0; 3	3.8; 5	1.9; 0	–	3.4
Target Point/El Debate	27–28 May	1,007	66	31.2; 134/136	25.4; 103/105	18.9; 67/69	5.3; 5/6	? 12/13	? 4	? 6/7	? 6	? 2	? 1	? 1	? 2	3.1; 2/3	2.0; 0	–	5.8
GAD3/ABC	26–28 May	1,011	?	33.1; 141	26.8; 107	17.1; 60	5.9; 7	2.0; 8	1.6; 7	1.4; 8	1.0; 5	0.8; 2	0.5; 2	0.1; 0	1.2; 1	3.1; 2	1.4; 0	–	6.3
NC Report/La Razón	25–27 May	1,000	62.3	34.7; 148/151	25.1; 100/103	17.9; 58/60	6.3; 9/11	1.9; 7	1.6; 6	1.4; 6	1.0; 5	0.8; 2	0.4; 1	0.2; 1	–	3.6; 2	–	–	9.6
DYM/Henneo	20–22 May	1,009	?	34.8; 144/148	27.7; 107/111	16.0; 54/56	5.7; 7/9	–	–	–	–	–	–	–	–	3.5; 2/3	1.1; 0	–	6.9
EM-Analytics/Electomanía	19–22 May	1,291	?	32.0; 129	29.1; 113	18.5; 60	6.0; 10	1.8; 7	1.6; 7	1.3; 6	1.2; 6	0.9; 2	0.3; 1	0.2; 1	1.0; 3	3.8; 5	1.8; 0	–	2.9
CIS (Target Point)	4–18 May	4,016	?	31.0; 133	27.4; 118	19.0; 69	5.8; 8	1.8; 7	0.9; 3	1.2; 7	0.8; 4	0.4; 0	–	–	–	2.3; 1	2.5; 0	–	3.6
CIS (Ateneo del Dato)	4–18 May	4,016	?	30.7; 129	30.3; 121	17.4; 60	6.4; 11	–	–	–	–	–	–	–	–	2.1; 0	1.8; 0	–	0.4
CIS	4–18 May	4,016	?	24.9	36.2	16.2	5.7	2.6	0.8	0.9	0.5	0.7	0.1	0.1	–	2.5	2.4	–	11.3
EM-Analytics/Electomanía	1–15 May	1,026	?	32.0; 131	28.7; 113	18.3; 60	6.2; 11	1.8; 7	1.6; 7	1.3; 6	1.2; 6	1.0; 2	0.4; 1	0.2; 1	0.1; 0	3.8; 5	2.0; 0	–	3.3
EM-Analytics/Electomanía	1–8 May	1,377	?	32.0; 132	29.0; 116	18.2; 57	6.0; 10	1.8; 7	1.5; 7	1.3; 6	1.2; 6	1.0; 2	0.4; 1	0.2; 1	0.1; 0	3.8; 5	2.0; 0	–	3.0
EM-Analytics/Electomanía	20 Apr–1 May	1,542	?	32.0; 135	28.3; 113	17.9; 57	5.9; 10	1.8; 7	1.5; 7	1.3; 6	1.2; 6	1.0; 2	0.4; 1	0.2; 1	0.1; 0	3.8; 5	2.0; 0	–	3.7
Sigma Dos/El Mundo	24–29 Apr	1,205	?	32.3; 138	28.4; 116	17.2; 57	6.9; 10	1.9; 8	1.1; 3	1.2; 6	1.2; 6	0.7; 1	0.5; 1	0.2; 1	–	3.5; 2	–	0.4; 1	3.9
40dB/Prisa	24–27 Apr	2,000	?	31.3	28.4	17.9	5.7	–	–	–	–	–	–	–	–	2.5	2.3	–	2.9
Ateneo del Dato	22–26 Apr	2,000	?	31.7; 133	27.5; 107	18.4; 68	5.6; 9	–	–	–	–	–	–	–	–	3.8; 2	2.6; 0	–	4.2
More in Common	21–25 Apr	2,547	68.3	31.1	28.0	17.1	7.7	–	–	–	–	–	–	–	–	2.9	1.8	–	3.1
EM-Analytics/Electomanía	12–24 Apr	1,844	?	31.9; 135	28.5; 114	18.0; 56	5.9; 10	1.8; 7	1.5; 7	1.3; 6	1.2; 6	1.0; 2	0.4; 1	0.2; 1	0.1; 0	3.8; 5	2.0; 0	–	3.4
KeyData/Público	23 Apr	?	69.3	32.4; 139	27.5; 111	17.7; 60	6.5; 10	1.9; 7	1.2; 5	1.4; 6	1.1; 6	0.8; 2	? 1	? 1	–	3.5; 2	1.9; 0	–	4.9
SocioMétrica/El Español	15–18 Apr	1,712	?	31.8; 140	27.0; 110	16.9; 59	6.6; 10	1.8; 7	1.2; 5	1.3; 6	1.1; 6	0.8; 2	0.4; 1	0.2; 1	–	3.4; 2	2.6; 0	–	4.8
EM-Analytics/Electomanía	12–17 Apr	1,301	?	31.5; 133	28.7; 116	18.1; 58	5.7; 9	1.8; 7	1.4; 6	1.3; 6	1.2; 6	1.0; 2	0.4; 1	0.2; 1	0.1; 0	3.7; 5	1.9; 0	–	2.8
CIS (Ateneo del Dato)	6–10 Apr	4,020	?	30.9; 130	28.9; 115	17.6; 63	5.7; 10	–	–	–	–	–	–	–	–	2.1; 0	1.8; 0	–	2.0
CIS (Logoslab)	6–10 Apr	4,020	?	30.1; 127	30.1; 121	16.9; 60	5.8; 8	–	–	–	–	–	–	–	–	2.1; 1	1.8; 0	–	Tie
CIS	6–10 Apr	4,020	?	23.6	36.4	14.7	5.8	2.9	0.8	1.3	0.8	0.8	0.2	0.1	–	2.2	1.7	–	12.8
EM-Analytics/Electomanía	5–10 Apr	1,597	?	31.2; 131	29.1; 117	18.4; 60	5.8; 9	1.7; 7	1.4; 5	1.3; 6	1.2; 6	0.9; 2	0.4; 1	0.2; 1	0.1; 0	3.7; 5	1.8; 0	–	2.1
NC Report/La Razón	6–9 Apr	1,000	63.2	32.8; 140/142	26.9; 107/109	18.3; 62/64	5.8; 8/9	1.9; 7	1.5; 6	1.4; 6	1.0; 5	0.8; 2	0.4; 1	0.2; 1	–	3.8; 2	–	–	5.9
Ipsos/La Vanguardia	23 Mar–8 Apr	1,058	67	30.9; 130	28.4; 117	18.3; 64	5.8; 7	2.2; 8	1.4; 5	1.9; 8	1.2; 6	0.8; 2	0.5; 1	0.1; 0	–	1.8; 0	2.2; 0	0.5; 2	2.5
EM-Analytics/Electomanía	28 Mar–3 Apr	1,107	?	30.8; 127	29.3; 119	18.7; 62	5.6; 9	1.7; 7	1.4; 5	1.3; 6	1.2; 6	0.9; 2	0.4; 1	0.2; 1	0.1; 0	3.7; 5	1.8; 0	–	1.5
Sigma Dos/El Mundo	16–31 Mar	1,958	?	32.5; 139	27.7; 113	17.1; 58	7.7; 12	1.8; 7	1.0; 3	1.4; 6	1.1; 6	0.6; 1	0.5; 1	0.2; 1	–	3.5; 2	–	0.4; 1	4.8
EM-Analytics/Electomanía	16–27 Mar	1,228	?	31.6; 131	28.8; 111	19.3; 67	5.4; 8	1.7; 7	1.3; 5	1.3; 6	1.2; 6	0.9; 2	0.4; 1	0.2; 1	0.1; 0	3.9; 5	1.6; 0	–	2.8
Target Point/El Debate	24–26 Mar	1,114	66	31.7; 131/133	27.6; 112/114	18.3; 63/64	6.9; 9/10	–	–	–	–	–	–	–	–	3.3; 2/3	2.2; 0	–	4.1
Sumar	25 Mar	1,000	?	30.0; 120/122	30.0; 116/118	18.0; 63	6.3; 9/10	? 9/10	? 6	? 8	? 4	? 4	–	–	–	3.0; 2	–	–	Tie
40dB/Prisa	24–25 Mar	2,000	?	31.1	28.6	18.7	5.8	–	–	–	–	–	–	–	–	2.7	1.6	–	2.5
DYM/Henneo	19–23 Mar	1,002	?	34.6; 143/147	27.9; 107/111	15.8; 54/56	4.9; 6/8	–	–	–	–	–	–	–	–	3.8; 2/3	0.8; 0	–	6.7
SocioMétrica/El Español	19–21 Mar	1,100	?	31.9; 140	26.5; 108	18.0; 62	6.6; 9	1.9; 8	1.1; 4	1.2; 6	1.1; 6	0.8; 2	0.4; 1	0.2; 1	–	3.6; 3	2.5; 0	–	5.4
EM-Analytics/Electomanía	16–20 Mar	1,086	?	31.1; 128	29.0; 110	19.8; 71	5.1; 8	1.7; 7	1.3; 5	1.3; 6	1.2; 6	0.9; 2	0.4; 1	0.2; 1	0.1; 0	3.8; 5	1.6; 0	–	2.1
EM-Analytics/Electomanía	28 Feb–13 Mar	2,541	?	30.7; 124	28.9; 112	20.3; 74	5.1; 7	1.7; 7	1.3; 5	1.3; 6	1.2; 6	0.9; 2	0.4; 1	0.2; 1	0.1; 0	3.8; 5	1.9; 0	–	1.8
CIS (Target Point)	2–6 Mar	4,016	?	30.4	28.4	18.7	6.6	1.9	0.8	1.3	0.8	0.6	–	–	–	3.2	2.4	–	2.0
CIS (Ateneo del Dato)	2–6 Mar	4,016	?	29.1; 125	25.5; 105	19.3; 74	6.1; 11	–	–	–	–	–	–	–	–	2.9; 2	1.9; 0	–	3.6
CIS (Logoslab)	2–6 Mar	4,016	?	28.8; 123	28.4; 117	18.1; 67	6.5; 9	–	–	–	–	–	–	–	–	2.9; 2	2.4; 0	–	0.4
CIS	2–6 Mar	4,016	?	23.3	31.8	16.6	7.1	2.4	0.6	1.1	0.5	1.7	0.0	0.0	–	2.9	2.1	–	8.5
EM-Analytics/Electomanía	28 Feb–6 Mar	1,741	?	31.0; 130	28.4; 109	19.2; 68	5.2; 8	1.5; 7	1.5; 7	1.3; 6	1.2; 6	0.8; 2	0.4; 1	0.2; 1	0.1; 0	3.6; 5	1.9; 0	–	2.6
EM-Analytics/Electomanía	28 Feb–4 Mar	1,428	?	30.5; 129	28.3; 109	19.5; 71	5.0; 8	1.5; 7	1.5; 7	1.3; 6	1.2; 6	0.8; 2	0.4; 1	0.2; 1	0.1; 0	3.3; 3	1.9; 0	–	2.2
Sigma Dos/El Mundo	23–27 Feb	1,969	?	31.9; 135	26.4; 108	18.3; 64	8.4; 14	1.9; 7	1.0; 3	1.1; 6	1.1; 6	0.7; 2	0.4; 1	0.2; 1	–	4.1; 2	–	0.4; 1	5.5
EM-Analytics/Electomanía	21–27 Feb	2,307	?	32.0; 133	26.5; 102	20.1; 71	5.7; 9	1.9; 7	1.4; 6	1.3; 7	1.1; 6	0.9; 2	0.4; 1	0.2; 1	0.1; 0	3.8; 5	2.2; 0	–	5.5
40dB/Prisa	20–23 Feb	2,000	?	30.2	27.7	18.8	5.9	–	–	–	–	–	–	–	–	3.3	2.3	–	2.5
Ateneo del Dato/elDiario.es	18–22 Feb	2,000	?	29.4; 118/121	27.0; 106/109	20.3; 73/77	7.2; 11	–	–	–	–	–	–	–	–	3.8; 2	–	–	2.4
EM-Analytics/Electomanía	9–20 Feb	1,841	?	31.9; 130	26.5; 102	20.3; 73	5.2; 8	1.9; 8	1.5; 7	1.3; 7	1.1; 6	0.9; 2	0.4; 1	0.2; 1	0.1; 0	3.8; 5	2.4; 0	–	5.4
Target Point/El Debate	17–19 Feb	1,005	66	30.5; 128/130	25.8; 105/107	20.3; 72/73	6.7; 9/10	–	–	–	–	–	–	–	–	3.7; 3/4	2.4; 0	–	4.7
SocioMétrica/El Español	11–13 Feb	1,200	?	32.1; 140	25.0; 98	18.4; 66	7.2; 11	? 8	? 6	? 7	? 6	? 2	? 1	? 1	–	4.2; 4	2.5; 0	–	7.1
NC Report/La Razón	10–13 Feb	1,000	63.1	33.1; 142/144	25.9; 100/102	18.1; 64/66	6.0; 9/10	1.8; 7	1.5; 6	1.4; 6	1.0; 5	0.8; 2	0.4; 1	0.2; 1	–	4.3; 2/3	–	–	7.2
EM-Analytics/Electomanía	1–12 Feb	1,635	?	32.0; 131	26.7; 103	20.1; 71	5.7; 9	1.9; 8	1.4; 6	1.3; 7	1.1; 6	0.9; 2	0.4; 1	0.2; 1	0.1; 0	4.0; 5	2.0; 0	–	5.3
Data10/Okdiario	10 Feb	?	?	31.6; 134	26.0; 107	19.5; 71	6.6; 10	2.0; 8	1.1; 4	1.3; 7	0.9; 5	0.8; 2	0.5; 1	0.2; 1	–	2.2; 0	2.9; 0	–	5.6
CIS (Logoslab)	2–6 Feb	4,027	?	27.8; 117	27.4; 111	20.0; 78	6.4; 9	–	–	–	–	–	–	–	–	3.8; 4	2.4; 0	–	0.4
CIS (Target Point)	2–6 Feb	4,027	?	29.1	26.7	20.6	6.7	2.1	1.3	1.1	1.2	0.5	–	–	–	4.0	2.7	–	2.4
CIS	2–6 Feb	4,027	?	22.9	32.6	18.9	7.0	2.5	1.2	1.0	0.8	0.8	0.1	0.1	–	3.9	2.4	–	9.7
EM-Analytics/Electomanía	31 Jan–6 Feb	2,012	?	31.8; 133	27.0; 104	19.6; 69	6.0; 10	2.0; 8	1.3; 4	1.4; 7	1.1; 6	1.0; 2	0.4; 1	0.2; 1	0.1; 0	3.9; 5	1.8; 0	–	4.8
40dB/Prisa	30 Jan–2 Feb	2,000	?	31.2	27.7	18.0	6.4	–	–	–	–	–	–	–	–	3.7	1.6	–	3.5
Sigma Dos/El Mundo	26–30 Jan	1,819	?	32.4; 139	26.1; 106	17.8; 61	8.2; 13	1.8; 7	0.9; 3	1.2; 6	1.1; 6	0.8; 2	0.4; 1	0.2; 1	–	4.6; 3	–	0.7; 2	6.3
EM-Analytics/Electomanía	24–30 Jan	1,289	?	32.1; 133	26.1; 103	20.0; 70	5.8; 9	1.9; 7	1.2; 5	1.5; 7	1.1; 6	1.2; 3	0.4; 1	0.2; 1	0.1; 0	4.1; 5	1.8; 0	–	6.0
DYM/Henneo	22–25 Jan	1,003	?	34.4; 141/145	27.0; 105/109	16.6; 56/59	5.0; 6/8	–	–	–	–	–	–	–	–	5.1; 3/5	0.5; 0	–	7.4
EM-Analytics/Electomanía	16–23 Jan	1,594	?	32.1; 134	26.0; 102	19.9; 69	5.6; 9	1.9; 7	1.3; 6	1.4; 7	1.1; 6	1.1; 3	0.4; 1	0.2; 1	0.1; 0	4.2; 5	1.7; 0	–	6.1
KeyData/Público	22 Jan	?	69.2	32.2; 137	26.5; 106	17.9; 63	7.2; 11	2.0; 8	1.2; 6	1.4; 6	1.1; 6	0.8; 2	? 1	? 1	–	4.2; 3	1.5; 0	–	5.7
DYM/Henneo	14–18 Jan	1,000	?	33.7	27.1	16.9	5.2	–	–	–	–	–	–	–	–	4.9	0.7	–	6.6
EM-Analytics/Electomanía	10–16 Jan	1,001	?	32.6; 135	26.5; 102	19.4; 69	5.2; 8	1.9; 8	1.5; 6	1.4; 7	1.1; 6	1.0; 2	0.4; 1	0.2; 1	0.1; 0	4.1; 5	1.6; 0	–	6.1
Target Point/El Debate	13–15 Jan	1,000	66	30.0; 126/128	26.1; 106/108	19.2; 68/70	8.0; 12/13	–	–	–	–	–	–	–	–	3.2; 2/3	1.8; 0	–	3.9
GESOP/Prensa Ibérica	12–15 Jan	1,002	?	30.0; 125/130	26.5; 105/110	17.8; 63/68	8.3; 16/18	2.2; 10/11	1.0; 3/4	–	–	–	–	–	–	4.3; 3/5	1.7; 0	–	3.5
SocioMétrica/El Español	7–10 Jan	1,300	?	32.5; 142	25.7; 102	17.9; 62	6.5; 9	2.1; 8	1.3; 6	1.5; 8	0.9; 4	1.1; 3	0.5; 1	0.2; 1	–	3.8; 4	2.1; 0	–	6.8
CIS (Logoslab)	5–10 Jan	4,006	?	28.0; 117	27.5; 111	20.0; 77	7.0; 11	–	–	–	–	–	–	–	–	3.2; 3	2.0; 0	–	0.5
CIS	5–10 Jan	4,006	?	23.0	31.7	17.7	7.2	2.6	1.0	1.5	1.0	0.9	0.3	0.1	–	3.5	1.8	–	8.7
EM-Analytics/Electomanía	1–10 Jan	1,083	?	32.3; 133	26.9; 103	19.7; 70	5.0; 8	1.9; 8	1.5; 6	1.4; 7	1.1; 6	1.0; 2	0.4; 1	0.2; 1	0.1; 0	4.0; 5	1.5; 0	–	5.4
NC Report/La Razón	5–9 Jan	1,000	62.9	33.5; 145/147	26.3; 103/105	17.6; 60/62	6.1; 9/10	1.8; 7	1.5; 6/7	1.4; 6	1.0; 5	0.8; 2	0.4; 1	0.2; 1	–	4.4; 2/3	–	–	6.8
40dB/Prisa	29 Dec–5 Jan	2,000	?	31.5	27.1	17.9	5.9	–	–	–	–	–	–	–	–	3.5	2.1	–	4.4
EM-Analytics/Electomanía	27 Dec–3 Jan	1,316	?	32.2; 133	26.8; 103	19.8; 71	4.7; 7	1.9; 8	1.5; 6	1.4; 7	1.1; 6	1.0; 2	0.4; 1	0.2; 1	0.1; 0	4.5; 5	1.5; 0	–	5.4

===== 2025 =====
Polling firm/Commissioner	Fieldwork date	Sample size	Turnout	PP	PSOE	Vox	Sumar	ERC	Junts	EH Bildu	PNV	BNG	CCa	UPN	Adelante Andalucía (2021)	Podemos	SALF	Aliança.cat	Lead
Sigma Dos/El Mundo	22–29 Dec	2,182	?	32.7; 141	26.5; 107	17.2; 58	8.5; 13	1.9; 7	1.0; 4	1.0; 6	1.0; 6	0.8; 2	0.5; 1	0.1; 1	–	4.4; 2	1.2; 0	0.7; 2	6.2
EM-Analytics/Electomanía	22–26 Dec	2,301	?	31.9; 133	27.3; 103	19.6; 70	5.4; 8	1.9; 8	1.5; 6	1.4; 7	1.3; 6	1.1; 2	0.4; 1	0.2; 1	0.1; 0	4.4; 5	1.7; 0	–	4.6
InvyMark/laSexta	15–19 Dec	?	?	33.5	27.4	18.6	5.2	1.8	1.3	1.5	1.1	–	–	–	–	3.8	1.5	–	6.1
EM-Analytics/Electomanía	12–19 Dec	1,782	?	31.8; 131	28.3; 107	19.3; 68	5.7; 9	1.9; 7	1.5; 6	1.4; 7	1.3; 6	1.1; 2	0.4; 1	0.2; 1	0.1; 0	4.2; 5	1.7; 0	–	3.5
EM-Analytics/Electomanía	6–12 Dec	1,522	?	31.9; 130	28.6; 108	19.2; 66	5.8; 9	1.9; 7	1.5; 7	1.4; 7	1.3; 6	1.1; 3	0.4; 1	0.2; 1	0.1; 0	4.0; 5	1.7; 0	–	3.3
SocioMétrica/El Español	5–7 Dec	1,100	?	33.4; 144	26.2; 103	17.4; 59	7.0; 10	2.0; 8	1.2; 4	1.4; 7	1.0; 6	0.9; 2	0.4; 1	0.2; 1	–	2.8; 2	2.3; 0	0.9; 3	7.2
SocioMétrica/El Español	5–7 Dec	1,100	?	33.4; 145	26.2; 102	17.4; 59	7.5; 11	1.9; 8	1.3; 6	1.4; 7	1.0; 6	0.9; 2	0.4; 1	0.2; 1	–	2.8; 2	2.3; 0	–	7.2
CIS (Logoslab)	1–5 Dec	4,017	?	28.0; 118	28.0; 113	18.8; 71	7.2; 13	–	–	–	–	–	–	–	–	3.8; 4	2.4; 1	–	Tie
CIS	1–5 Dec	4,017	?	22.4	31.4	17.6	7.8	2.1	0.8	1.5	0.9	0.8	0.2	0.1	–	4.1	2.4	0.5	9.0
InvyMark/laSexta	1–5 Dec	?	?	33.2	27.6	18.5	5.0	1.7	1.4	1.4	1.1	–	–	–	–	3.8	1.4	–	5.6
EM-Analytics/Electomanía	29 Nov–5 Dec	1,204	?	31.7; 130	29.1; 109	19.4; 67	5.5; 8	1.9; 7	1.5; 7	1.4; 7	1.3; 6	1.1; 2	0.4; 1	0.2; 1	0.1; 0	3.9; 5	1.5; 0	–	2.6
Sigma Dos/El Mundo	26 Nov–5 Dec	1,565	?	33.1; 143	27.3; 108	16.9; 57	7.8; 11	1.9; 7	1.0; 4	1.0; 6	1.0; 6	0.8; 2	0.5; 1	0.1; 1	–	4.3; 2	1.2; 0	0.7; 2	5.8
40dB/Prisa	27 Nov–1 Dec	2,500	?	31.0	27.8	17.4	5.7	–	–	–	–	–	–	–	–	3.7	2.3	–	3.2
EM-Analytics/Electomanía	22–28 Nov	1,379	?	31.9; 130	29.0; 110	19.2; 64	5.6; 9	1.9; 7	1.5; 7	1.4; 7	1.3; 6	1.1; 3	0.4; 1	0.2; 1	0.1; 0	4.0; 5	1.5; 0	–	2.9
InvyMark/laSexta	17–21 Nov	?	?	33.5	28.6	17.4	–	–	–	–	–	–	–	–	–	–	–	–	4.9
EM-Analytics/Electomanía	15–21 Nov	1,922	?	32.1; 131	29.3; 110	18.8; 63	5.6; 9	1.9; 7	1.5; 7	1.4; 7	1.3; 6	1.1; 3	0.4; 1	0.2; 1	0.1; 0	4.1; 5	1.6; 0	–	2.8
Target Point/El Debate	17–19 Nov	1,200	?	29.2; 123/125	28.1; 114/116	19.0; 67/69	6.1; 9	–	–	–	–	–	–	–	–	3.6; 3/4	2.0; 0	–	1.1
DYM/Henneo	12–14 Nov	1,000	?	33.4; 141/145	27.3; 109/112	16.2; 52/55	6.3; 9/10	–	–	–	–	–	–	–	–	4.0; 2/3	0.9; 0	–	6.1
NC Report/La Razón	11–14 Nov	1,000	63.2	33.8; 147/149	27.2; 107/109	16.7; 54/56	5.6; 8/9	1.7; 6	1.6; 7	1.3; 6	1.0; 5	0.8; 2	0.4; 1	0.2; 1	–	4.1; 2/3	1.9; 0	–	6.6
EM-Analytics/Electomanía	8–14 Nov	1,002	?	31.6; 130	29.0; 110	18.9; 65	5.4; 8	1.8; 7	1.6; 7	1.4; 7	1.3; 6	1.1; 3	0.4; 1	0.2; 1	0.1; 0	4.1; 5	1.4; 0	–	2.6
CIS (Opina 360)	3–12 Nov	4,028	?	26.1	28.5	20.9	7.0	–	–	–	–	–	–	–	–	3.9	0.6	–	2.4
CIS	3–12 Nov	4,028	?	22.4	32.6	18.8	7.1	2.2	1.1	1.2	0.7	1.1	0.2	0.1	–	4.0	0.6	–	10.2
SocioMétrica/El Español	6–8 Nov	1,100	?	33.7; 146	27.2; 105	16.9; 56	6.6; 10	1.8; 7	1.6; 8	1.2; 6	1.0; 6	0.9; 2	0.3; 1	0.2; 1	–	3.5; 2	1.7; 0	–	6.5
EM-Analytics/Electomanía	1–7 Nov	1,923	?	31.3; 130	28.9; 110	18.9; 65	5.4; 8	1.8; 7	1.6; 7	1.4; 7	1.3; 6	1.1; 3	0.4; 1	0.2; 1	0.1; 0	4.2; 5	1.6; 0	–	2.4
Cluster17/Agenda Pública	4–6 Nov	1,847	?	31.2	28.4	18.5	5.4	1.7	1.5	1.1	1.3	–	–	–	–	4.5	1.2	–	2.8
Sigma Dos/El Mundo	30 Oct–6 Nov	1,558	?	33.6; 144	27.4; 110	16.2; 55	7.5; 11	1.8; 7	1.0; 4	1.1; 6	1.0; 6	0.8; 2	0.5; 1	0.1; 1	–	4.2; 2	0.9; 0	0.6; 1	6.2
Opina 360/Telecinco	31 Oct–4 Nov	1,202	?	28.2; 118	28.1; 116	19.5; 74	6.9; 11	1.9; 7/8	1.6; 7	1.1; 6	1.0; 6	0.5; 1	0.3; 1	–	–	3.1; 2	1.6; 0	0.5; 0/1	0.1
Hamalgama Métrica/Vozpópuli	28 Oct–4 Nov	1,000	?	33.6; 145	26.5; 105	18.6; 62	6.2; 7	1.7; 7	1.5; 6	1.4; 6	0.9; 4	0.7; 2	0.6; 1	0.2; 1	–	4.1; 4	1.6; 0	–	7.1
EM-Analytics/Electomanía	25–31 Oct	2,823	?	31.3; 130	28.7; 111	18.7; 64	5.4; 9	1.8; 7	1.6; 7	1.3; 6	1.3; 6	1.1; 3	0.4; 1	0.2; 1	0.1; 0	4.5; 5	1.6; 0	–	2.6
40dB/Prisa	24–26 Oct	2,000	?	30.5	28.3	17.1	6.8	–	–	–	–	–	–	–	–	3.0	1.6	–	2.2
EM-Analytics/Electomanía	18–24 Oct	2,104	?	31.6; 131	28.3; 111	18.5; 63	5.6; 9	1.8; 7	1.6; 7	1.3; 6	1.3; 6	1.1; 3	0.4; 1	0.2; 1	0.1; 0	4.6; 5	1.7; 0	–	3.3
EM-Analytics/Electomanía	11–17 Oct	1,568	?	32.0; 133	27.8; 109	18.2; 62	5.6; 9	1.7; 7	1.6; 7	1.3; 7	1.3; 6	1.0; 3	0.4; 1	0.2; 1	0.1; 0	4.8; 5	1.4; 0	–	4.2
KeyData/Público	16 Oct	?	69.1	32.3; 139	27.3; 111	17.1; 59	6.2; 9	1.8; 7	1.4; 6	1.4; 6	1.1; 6	0.7; 2	? 1	? 1	–	4.2; 3	1.6; 0	–	5.0
SocioMétrica/El Español	6–10 Oct	900	?	34.0; 147	26.9; 105	16.6; 55	6.2; 8	1.9; 7	1.7; 8	1.4; 7	1.0; 5	0.8; 2	0.3; 1	0.2; 1	–	3.9; 4	1.6; 0	–	7.1
EM-Analytics/Electomanía	4–10 Oct	2,971	?	32.4; 139	27.3; 105	18.1; 60	5.5; 9	1.6; 7	1.7; 8	1.3; 7	1.2; 6	0.9; 2	0.4; 1	0.2; 1	0.1; 0	5.0; 5	1.3; 0	–	5.1
GESOP/Prensa Ibérica	3–9 Oct	1,000	?	29.0; 117/121	27.8; 112/117	18.4; 68/72	8.0; 14/16	2.0; 8/10	1.0; 4/5	–	–	–	–	–	–	3.7; 3/4	1.6; 0	–	1.2
CIS (Opina 360)	1–7 Oct	4,029	?	25.9	27.7	20.7	6.9	–	–	–	–	–	–	–	–	4.7	1.3	–	1.8
CIS (Logoslab)	1–7 Oct	4,029	71	27.0; 115	28.0; 115	19.5; 74	7.1; 12	–	–	–	–	–	–	–	–	4.7; 5	1.4; 0	–	1.0
CIS	1–7 Oct	4,029	?	19.8	34.8	17.7	7.7	2.0	1.0	1.0	0.9	0.8	0.1	0.1	–	4.9	1.3	–	15.0
NC Report/La Razón	1–4 Oct	1,000	63.3	34.4; 150/152	26.6; 106/108	16.1; 53/55	4.8; 7/8	1.7; 6	1.7; 7	1.3; 6	1.1; 5	0.8; 2	0.5; 1	0.2; 1	–	4.6; 3/4	–	–	7.8
EM-Analytics/Electomanía	27 Sep–3 Oct	1,055	?	32.7; 140	27.0; 104	17.8; 59	5.5; 9	1.7; 7	1.8; 8	1.4; 7	1.2; 6	0.8; 2	0.4; 1	0.2; 1	0.1; 0	5.3; 6	1.3; 0	–	5.7
Sigma Dos/El Mundo	17 Sep–1 Oct	2,345	?	33.8; 146	27.2; 109	15.9; 53	7.4; 12	1.7; 7	1.1; 4	1.1; 6	1.0; 6	0.8; 2	0.5; 1	0.2; 1	–	4.0; 2	1.3; 0	0.5; 1	6.6
Opina 360/Antena 3	25–30 Sep	1,203	?	27.4; 111	30.4; 129/130	20.6; 74	5.1; 5	1.8; 7	1.3; 5	1.5; 7	1.0; 5	1.0; 2	0.3; 1	–	–	3.8; 3	1.4; 0	0.7; 0/1	3.0
40dB/Prisa	26–28 Sep	2,000	?	30.5	29.4	16.7	6.7	–	–	–	–	–	–	–	–	2.8	1.3	–	1.1
EM-Analytics/Electomanía	20–26 Sep	2,028	?	32.3; 139	26.8; 104	17.7; 59	5.4; 8	1.7; 7	1.7; 8	1.4; 7	1.2; 6	0.8; 2	0.4; 1	0.2; 1	0.1; 0	5.5; 8	1.4; 0	–	5.5
InvyMark/laSexta	15–19 Sep	?	?	36.1	28.3	16.3	4.7	–	–	–	–	–	–	–	–	4.0	1.5	–	7.8
EM-Analytics/Electomanía	6–19 Sep	1,723	?	32.0; 137	27.0; 104	17.5; 58	5.4; 8	1.6; 7	1.8; 8	1.4; 7	1.2; 6	0.9; 2	0.4; 1	0.2; 1	0.1; 0	5.9; 10	1.5; 0	–	5.0
DYM/Henneo	10–15 Sep	1,016	?	35.2; 150/154	26.9; 109/113	15.7; 42/44	5.6; 8/9	–	–	–	–	–	–	–	–	3.9; 2/3	0.4; 0	–	8.3
Celeste-Tel/Onda Cero	8–12 Sep	1,100	65.5	34.9; 153	26.1; 105	15.2; 48	6.9; 11	1.7; 7	1.6; 7	1.4; 6	1.2; 5	0.8; 2	0.5; 1	0.2; 1	–	4.7; 4	1.7; 0	–	8.8
EM-Analytics/Electomanía	6–12 Sep	1,207	?	32.0; 136	26.7; 104	17.3; 57	6.2; 11	1.6; 7	1.8; 8	1.3; 7	1.2; 6	0.9; 2	0.4; 1	0.2; 1	0.1; 0	6.0; 9	1.5; 0	–	5.3
Target Point/El Debate	10–11 Sep	1,027	?	31.6; 136/137	27.0; 110/112	17.2; 57/59	7.4; 11/12	–	–	–	–	–	–	–	–	4.1; 4/5	1.9; 0	–	4.6
GAD3/ABC	5–11 Sep	1,001	?	32.0; 137	26.9; 107	17.9; 61	6.6; 10	2.0; 8	1.4; 6	1.3; 8	1.0; 6	0.8; 2	0.3; 1	0.1; 0	–	4.0; 4	2.0; 0	–	5.1
Hamalgama Métrica/Vozpópuli	3–9 Sep	1,000	?	34.4; 152	25.8; 106	16.0; 54	6.0; 7	1.7; 7	1.5; 6	1.3; 6	1.1; 4	0.7; 2	0.5; 1	0.2; 1	–	4.7; 4	2.0; 0	–	8.6
CIS (Opina 360)	1–6 Sep	4,122	?	27.6	29.3	17.3	7.2	–	–	–	–	–	–	–	–	4.2	1.6	–	1.7
CIS (Logoslab)	1–6 Sep	4,122	?	28.5; 122	28.6; 118	17.3; 64	7.1; 11	–	–	–	–	–	–	–	–	4.0; 4	1.7; 0	–	0.1
CIS	1–6 Sep	4,122	?	23.7	32.7	17.3	7.9	2.1	0.8	1.1	0.6	0.7	0.1	0.1	–	4.3	1.6	–	9.0
NC Report/La Razón	1–6 Sep	1,000	63.1	35.2; 154/156	25.8; 103/105	15.4; 48/50	4.9; 7/8	1.6; 6	1.7; 7	1.3; 6	1.1; 5	0.8; 2	0.5; 1	0.2; 1	–	5.2; 5/6	–	–	9.4
Demoscopia y Servicios/esRadio	2–5 Sep	3,000	?	35.1; 149	26.6; 105	16.7; 56	6.1; 7	1.6; 7	1.3; 5	1.5; 7	1.0; 6	0.7; 2	? 1	? 1	–	5.1; 4	1.7; 0	–	8.5
EM-Analytics/Electomanía	29 Aug–5 Sep	1,330	?	31.4; 133	26.2; 104	17.5; 59	6.2; 11	1.7; 7	1.8; 8	1.3; 7	1.2; 6	0.9; 2	0.4; 1	0.2; 1	0.1; 0	6.3; 10	1.8; 0	–	5.2
40dB/Prisa	29 Aug–1 Sep	2,000	?	30.7	27.7	17.4	6.6	–	–	–	–	–	–	–	–	3.4	1.6	–	3.0
SocioMétrica/El Español	26–29 Aug	1,100	?	34.5; 150	26.2; 102	16.1; 53	6.9; 11	1.6; 7	1.6; 7	1.5; 7	1.3; 5	1.0; 2	0.3; 1	0.2; 1	–	4.0; 4	1.7; 0	–	8.3
EM-Analytics/Electomanía	22–29 Aug	1,003	?	30.2; 129	26.1; 103	17.8; 64	6.6; 12	1.7; 7	1.8; 8	1.3; 7	1.2; 6	0.9; 2	0.4; 1	0.2; 1	0.1; 0	6.1; 9	2.0; 0	–	4.1
Sigma Dos/El Mundo	20–28 Aug	1,783	?	34.4; 149	27.0; 109	15.1; 48	7.8; 13	1.8; 8	1.3; 5	1.2; 6	1.1; 6	0.8; 2	0.5; 1	0.2; 1	–	4.2; 2	1.2; 0	–	7.4
EM-Analytics/Electomanía	1–22 Aug	1,840	?	30.3; 130	25.5; 102	17.7; 63	6.7; 11	1.6; 7	1.8; 8	1.4; 7	1.3; 6	1.0; 3	0.5; 1	0.2; 1	0.1; 0	6.4; 10	1.8; 0	–	4.8
EM-Analytics/Electomanía	1–17 Aug	1,275	?	31.4; 138	24.6; 97	17.2; 61	6.9; 13	1.8; 7	2.0; 8	1.3; 7	1.3; 6	0.9; 2	0.5; 1	0.2; 1	0.1; 0	5.9; 9	2.0; 0	–	6.8
EM-Analytics/Electomanía	28 Jul–9 Aug	1,007	?	31.4; 137	25.0; 98	17.5; 62	6.3; 12	1.8; 7	2.0; 8	1.3; 7	1.2; 6	0.9; 2	0.5; 1	0.2; 1	0.1; 0	5.7; 9	1.9; 0	–	6.4
EM-Analytics/Electomanía	18 Jul–1 Aug	1,579	?	31.6; 140	25.1; 98	17.0; 59	6.3; 12	1.8; 7	1.9; 8	1.3; 7	1.2; 6	0.9; 2	0.5; 1	0.2; 1	0.1; 0	6.2; 9	2.1; 0	–	6.5
Sigma Dos/El Mundo	21–30 Jul	2,267	?	34.9; 152	26.7; 108	14.8; 47	7.9; 13	1.8; 7	1.3; 5	1.2; 6	1.0; 6	0.8; 2	0.4; 1	0.2; 1	–	4.4; 2	1.5; 0	–	8.2
EM-Analytics/Electomanía	11–25 Jul	2,022	?	32.5; 142	25.9; 99	17.3; 58	5.6; 8	1.7; 7	1.7; 8	1.1; 7	1.2; 6	1.0; 2	0.4; 1	0.3; 2	0.1; 0	5.7; 10	1.7; 0	–	6.6
SocioMétrica/El Español	21–24 Jul	1,100	?	35.5; 153	25.0; 99	16.0; 54	6.3; 8	1.6; 7	1.7; 7	1.4; 7	1.3; 5	1.1; 3	0.4; 1	0.2; 1	–	3.8; 3	1.7; 0	0.8; 2	10.5
Hamalgama Métrica/Vozpópuli	14–18 Jul	1,000	?	35.0; 154	25.4; 105	15.4; 49	5.6; 8	1.7; 7	1.6; 6	1.3; 6	1.2; 5	0.7; 2	0.5; 1	0.2; 1	–	5.3; 6	2.2; 0	–	9.6
EM-Analytics/Electomanía	11–18 Jul	1,502	?	33.2; 145	25.5; 100	17.3; 57	5.2; 7	1.6; 7	1.7; 8	1.3; 7	1.2; 6	1.0; 2	0.4; 1	0.2; 1	0.0; 0	5.6; 9	2.3; 0	–	7.7
KeyData/Público	17 Jul	?	69.3	35.1; 153	26.3; 108	14.7; 46	6.6; 10	1.8; 7	1.5; 6	1.3; 6	1.1; 6	0.7; 2	? 1	? 1	–	4.6; 4	1.4; 0	–	8.8
DYM/Henneo	11–14 Jul	1,000	?	36.1; 154/158	26.1; 105/109	14.6; 38/40	6.6; 10/12	–	–	–	–	–	–	–	–	3.7; 2/3	1.0; 0	–	10.0
Celeste-Tel/Onda Cero	10–14 Jul	1,100	66.0	35.5; 158	25.6; 104	14.3; 44	6.9; 10	1.8; 7	1.6; 7	1.4; 6	1.2; 5	0.8; 2	0.5; 1	0.2; 1	–	5.4; 5	1.9; 0	–	9.9
EM-Analytics/Electomanía	5–11 Jul	1,327	?	34.3; 149	24.8; 98	16.4; 53	5.2; 8	1.7; 7	1.6; 8	1.3; 7	1.2; 6	1.0; 2	0.4; 1	0.2; 1	0.0; 0	6.0; 10	2.7; 0	–	9.5
Target Point/El Debate	9–10 Jul	1,002	?	34.6; 150/151	26.0; 106/108	15.6; 48/49	7.0; 10/11	–	–	–	–	–	–	–	–	4.2; 3/4	1.9; 0	–	8.6
CIS (Opina 360)	1–7 Jul	4,018	?	30.6	24.5	18.9	7.4	–	–	–	–	–	–	–	–	4.5	1.4	–	6.1
CIS (Logoslab)	1–7 Jul	4,018	?	30.5; 133	24.6; 100	18.5; 67	7.4; 12	–	–	–	–	–	–	–	–	4.5; 5	1.7; 0	–	5.9
CIS	1–7 Jul	4,018	?	26.5	27.0	18.9	7.8	2.1	1.0	0.9	0.8	0.7	0.3	0.1	–	4.4	1.7	–	0.5
InvyMark/laSexta	30 Jun–4 Jul	?	?	36.2	29.2	14.2	5.2	–	–	–	–	–	–	–	–	4.1	1.9	–	7.0
EM-Analytics/Electomanía	27 Jun–4 Jul	1,111	?	35.4; 157	23.8; 93	16.0; 51	5.0; 7	1.9; 8	1.7; 8	1.3; 7	1.2; 6	0.9; 2	0.4; 1	0.3; 1	0.0; 0	5.9; 9	2.4; 0	–	11.6
40dB/Prisa	27–30 Jun	2,000	?	33.3	27.0	15.2	6.2	–	–	–	–	–	–	–	–	3.8	2.5	–	6.3
Sigma Dos/El Mundo	20–27 Jun	1,909	?	34.7; 152	26.8; 111	13.9; 44	7.5; 12	1.8; 7	1.3; 5	1.2; 6	1.1; 6	0.8; 2	0.4; 1	0.2; 1	–	4.5; 3	1.3; 0	–	7.9
EM-Analytics/Electomanía	20–27 Jun	1,418	?	35.3; 156	24.0; 97	15.6; 49	4.5; 5	2.0; 8	1.7; 8	1.4; 7	1.3; 6	0.7; 2	0.5; 1	0.2; 1	0.0; 0	6.1; 10	2.6; 0	–	11.3
NC Report/La Razón	19–21 Jun	1,000	63.8	35.7; 157/159	25.5; 105/107	14.8; 42/43	4.5; 6/7	1.5; 6	1.7; 7	1.4; 6	1.1; 5	0.7; 2	0.5; 1	0.2; 1	–	5.8; 7/8	–	–	10.2
SocioMétrica/El Español	18–21 Jun	1,150	?	35.1; 153	26.7; 105	14.0; 43	6.2; 13	1.7; 7	1.8; 7	1.5; 7	1.2; 5	0.9; 2	0.5; 1	0.2; 1	–	3.9; 4	1.8; 0	0.8; 2	8.4
Target Point/El Debate	18–20 Jun	1,000	?	34.0; 147/148	26.3; 108/110	15.8; 49/50	7.4; 11/13	–	–	–	–	–	–	–	–	2.9; 2	2.3; 0/1	–	7.7
InvyMark/laSexta	16–20 Jun	?	?	36.6	29.3	14.1	4.5	–	–	–	–	–	–	–	–	3.9	2.0	–	7.3
EM-Analytics/Electomanía	13–20 Jun	3,219	?	35.0; 154	24.3; 98	15.5; 47	5.1; 6	1.8; 7	1.8; 8	1.3; 7	1.2; 6	0.8; 2	0.4; 1	0.3; 1	0.1; 0	6.2; 10	3.0; 1	–	10.7
DYM/Henneo	17 Jun	1,042	?	36.0; 154/158	26.1; 107/111	13.6; 34/37	7.6; 12/15	–	–	–	–	–	–	–	–	3.5; 2/3	0.6; 0	–	9.9
EM-Analytics/Electomanía	12–13 Jun	1,852	?	34.6; 150	26.1; 107	15.2; 47	4.7; 6	1.7; 7	1.9; 8	1.3; 7	1.2; 6	0.6; 2	0.5; 1	0.2; 1	0.1; 0	5.5; 8	2.4; 0	–	8.5
InvyMark/laSexta	9–13 Jun	?	?	35.7	30.2	13.8	4.7	–	–	–	–	–	–	–	–	3.7	2.3	–	5.5
GESOP/Prensa Ibérica	10–12 Jun	1,002	?	30.5; 131/135	27.0; 112/116	16.0; 57/61	7.5; 12/14	1.7; 7	1.2; 4/5	–	–	–	–	–	–	3.8; 4	2.0; 0	–	3.5
CIS (Opina 360)	2–7 Jun	4,013	?	32.3	29.6	14.6	6.3	–	–	–	–	–	–	–	–	4.4	1.4	–	2.7
CIS (Logoslab)	2–7 Jun	4,013	?	32.3; 138	29.5; 122	14.1; 44	6.5; 10	–	–	–	–	–	–	–	–	4.4; 5	1.4; 0	–	2.8
CIS	2–7 Jun	4,013	?	27.3	34.3	13.2	7.0	1.4	1.1	1.2	0.6	0.6	0.4	0.1	–	4.2	1.5	–	7.0
EM-Analytics/Electomanía	31 May–6 Jun	1,233	?	34.0; 148	28.2; 116	13.9; 38	6.0; 10	1.8; 7	2.0; 8	1.3; 6	1.2; 6	0.7; 2	0.4; 1	0.2; 1	0.1; 0	5.3; 7	1.7; 0	–	5.8
EM-Analytics/Electomanía	17–30 May	1,804	?	34.4; 150	28.1; 116	13.8; 37	5.8; 9	1.8; 7	2.0; 8	1.3; 6	1.2; 6	0.7; 2	0.4; 1	0.2; 1	0.1; 0	5.6; 7	1.8; 0	–	6.3
GAD3/ABC	27–29 May	1,023	?	33.8; 145	27.6; 110	14.9; 48	7.5; 11	1.5; 7	1.4; 7	1.4; 7	1.1; 6	0.7; 2	0.4; 1	0.2; 1	–	4.7; 5	–	–	6.2
Sigma Dos/El Mundo	21 Apr–28 May	7,236	?	34.1; 149	28.4; 118	13.5; 39	7.5; 12	1.9; 7	1.3; 5	1.3; 6	1.1; 6	0.7; 2	0.4; 1	0.2; 1	–	5.1; 4	2.1; 0	–	5.7
40dB/Prisa	23–26 May	2,000	?	32.8	29.8	13.9	5.4	–	–	–	–	–	–	–	–	3.8	1.6	–	3.0
Target Point/El Debate	21–23 May	1,002	?	33.1; 142/144	28.8; 120/122	13.9; 41/43	6.7; 10/11	–	–	–	–	–	–	–	–	4.4; 4	1.9; 0	–	4.3
Hamalgama Métrica/Vozpópuli	20–23 May	1,000	?	34.5; 150	27.6; 115	14.5; 42	5.4; 8	1.6; 6	1.9; 8	1.3; 6	1.2; 6	0.7; 2	0.5; 1	0.2; 1	–	5.1; 5	–	–	6.9
EM-Analytics/Electomanía	17–23 May	1,002	?	33.2; 141	28.3; 120	14.3; 40	5.8; 9	1.6; 7	2.0; 8	1.3; 6	1.3; 6	0.7; 2	0.5; 1	0.2; 1	0.1; 0	5.6; 9	2.0; 0	–	4.9
KeyData/Público	22 May	?	68.8	34.1; 148	28.4; 119	13.7; 40	5.8; 9	1.7; 7	1.7; 7	1.3; 6	1.1; 6	0.7; 2	? 1	? 1	–	4.7; 4	2.1; 0	–	5.7
SocioMétrica/El Español	19–22 May	1,812	?	34.9; 151	29.0; 116	13.5; 38	5.4; 9	1.6; 7	1.9; 8	1.4; 7	1.1; 5	0.9; 2	0.5; 1	0.2; 1	–	4.1; 5	2.0; 0	–	5.9
Ipsos/La Vanguardia	15–21 May	2,000	66–67	34.4; 145	30.4; 128	14.1; 43	5.8; 5	1.7; 7	1.5; 5	1.3; 6	1.2; 6	0.8; 2	0.4; 1	0.1; 0	–	2.7; 2	1.7; 0	–	4.0
DYM/Henneo	14–19 May	1,057	?	35.9; 153/157	28.7; 117/121	12.3; 30/33	6.2; 9/11	–	–	–	–	–	–	–	–	5.1; 4/5	0.7; 0	–	7.2
EM-Analytics/Electomanía	10–16 May	1,178	?	33.7; 144	28.6; 121	14.0; 38	5.4; 9	1.5; 6	2.0; 8	1.3; 6	1.2; 6	0.7; 2	0.5; 1	0.2; 1	0.1; 0	5.4; 8	2.1; 0	–	5.1
EM-Analytics/Electomanía	3–9 May	1,204	?	33.7; 144	29.5; 122	13.8; 37	5.6; 9	1.6; 7	2.0; 8	1.4; 6	1.3; 6	0.7; 2	0.5; 1	0.2; 1	0.1; 0	5.5; 7	2.0; 0	–	4.2
CIS (Opina 360)	5–8 May	4,018	?	32.1	29.4	14.6	6.3	–	–	–	–	–	–	–	–	4.6	1.5	–	2.7
CIS (Logoslab)	5–8 May	4,018	?	32.0; 138	29.4; 122	14.2; 44	6.5; 10	–	–	–	–	–	–	–	–	4.6; 5	1.5; 0	–	2.6
CIS	5–8 May	4,018	?	29.3	32.0	13.7	6.1	1.6	1.1	0.8	1.1	1.0	0.3	0.1	–	4.3	1.5	–	2.7
Celeste-Tel/Onda Cero	28 Apr–6 May	1,100	67.0	34.5; 149	28.4; 119	13.5; 38	5.7; 8	1.7; 7	1.9; 8	1.3; 6	1.2; 5	0.8; 2	0.5; 1	0.2; 1	–	5.5; 6	1.9; 0	–	6.1
EM-Analytics/Electomanía	26 Apr–2 May	1,159	?	33.2; 142	29.8; 126	13.6; 36	5.4; 8	1.6; 7	2.0; 8	1.4; 6	1.3; 6	0.7; 2	0.5; 1	0.2; 1	0.1; 0	5.4; 7	1.9; 0	–	3.4
40dB/Prisa	24–27 Apr	2,000	?	33.9	29.3	13.4	5.4	–	–	–	–	–	–	–	–	3.1	2.1	–	4.6
Target Point/El Debate	23–25 Apr	1,016	?	33.5; 144/146	28.1; 118/120	14.3; 42/44	6.5; 9/10	–	–	–	–	–	–	–	–	5.3; 4/5	1.8; 0	–	5.4
SocioMétrica/El Español	21–25 Apr	1,000	?	34.8; 150	29.5; 117	13.5; 40	5.5; 7	1.7; 7	1.9; 8	1.4; 7	1.0; 5	0.9; 2	0.4; 1	0.2; 1	–	4.0; 4	2.2; 0	–	5.3
EM-Analytics/Electomanía	19–25 Apr	1,206	?	33.7; 144	29.4; 122	13.9; 37	5.3; 8	1.6; 7	1.9; 8	1.3; 6	1.3; 6	0.7; 2	0.4; 1	0.2; 1	0.1; 0	5.5; 8	2.0; 0	–	4.3
EM-Analytics/Electomanía	12–18 Apr	1,142	?	33.5; 143	29.8; 123	14.0; 37	5.8; 9	1.6; 7	1.9; 8	1.3; 6	1.3; 6	0.7; 2	0.4; 1	0.2; 1	0.1; 0	5.5; 7	2.0; 0	–	3.7
NC Report/La Razón	14–17 Apr	1,000	65.5	34.3; 146/148	28.6; 118/120	14.1; 40/42	5.4; 8/9	1.6; 6	1.8; 8	1.4; 6	1.2; 6	0.7; 2	0.5; 1	0.2; 1	–	4.4; 4/5	–	–	5.7
Hamalgama Métrica/Vozpópuli	9–15 Apr	1,000	?	34.2; 149	27.8; 116	14.6; 43	5.6; 8	1.7; 6	1.9; 8	1.3; 6	1.2; 6	0.7; 2	0.5; 1	0.2; 1	–	4.9; 4	–	–	6.4
Sigma Dos/El Mundo	4–15 Apr	1,819	?	33.9; 149	27.9; 118	12.6; 38	6.9; 11	1.7; 8	1.5; 7	1.1; 6	1.0; 6	0.9; 2	0.3; 1	0.2; 1	–	4.8; 3	2.4; 0	–	6.0
EM-Analytics/Electomanía	5–10 Apr	2,401	?	33.8; 145	29.5; 122	13.7; 37	5.9; 9	1.6; 7	1.9; 8	1.3; 6	1.3; 6	0.7; 2	0.4; 1	0.2; 1	0.1; 0	5.2; 6	2.1; 0	–	4.3
CIS (Opina 360)	1–8 Apr	4,009	?	29.5	30.3	15.2	6.9	–	–	–	–	–	–	–	–	4.5	1.7	–	0.8
CIS (Logoslab)	1–8 Apr	4,009	?	29.5; 128	30.5; 130	15.0; 49	6.8; 9	–	–	–	–	–	–	–	–	4.5; 5	1.9; 0	–	1.0
CIS	1–8 Apr	4,009	?	26.1	32.6	15.2	6.2	1.7	1.1	1.0	0.7	0.8	0.6	0.1	–	4.0	1.9	–	6.5
EM-Analytics/Electomanía	30 Mar–4 Apr	1,817	?	34.0; 145	29.9; 124	13.5; 34	6.0; 11	1.7; 7	1.8; 8	1.3; 6	1.3; 6	0.7; 2	0.4; 1	0.2; 1	0.1; 0	5.0; 5	2.1; 0	–	4.1
40dB/Prisa	28–31 Mar	2,000	?	32.6	29.5	14.1	5.1	–	–	–	–	–	–	–	–	3.3	2.7	–	3.1
Data10/Okdiario	27–28 Mar	1,500	?	35.3; 155	28.6; 115	13.9; 38	5.5; 6	? 7	1.6; 7	1.4; 7	–	–	–	–	–	? 4	–	–	6.7
EM-Analytics/Electomanía	23–28 Mar	2,202	?	33.3; 145	29.0; 120	13.9; 36	6.2; 12	1.8; 7	2.0; 8	1.4; 7	1.3; 6	0.8; 2	0.5; 1	0.2; 1	0.1; 0	4.7; 5	2.0; 0	–	4.3
EM-Analytics/Electomanía	15–22 Mar	1,501	?	33.5; 145	28.5; 119	14.0; 37	6.6; 13	1.8; 7	1.9; 8	1.3; 6	1.3; 6	0.7; 2	0.4; 1	0.2; 1	0.1; 0	4.7; 5	2.1; 0	–	5.0
SocioMétrica/El Español	19–21 Mar	1,903	?	34.0; 147	28.3; 115	13.9; 42	6.5; 9	1.7; 7	2.1; 8	1.3; 6	1.2; 6	1.0; 2	0.3; 1	0.2; 1	–	4.2; 4	2.2; 0	–	5.7
Target Point/El Debate	19–21 Mar	1,000	?	33.1; 141/143	30.2; 124/125	14.1; 42/43	5.5; 8/9	–	–	–	–	–	–	–	–	4.3; 3/5	2.0; 0/1	–	3.2
Celeste-Tel/Onda Cero	14–21 Mar	1,100	66.8	34.4; 148	28.0; 117	14.0; 41	6.3; 10	1.7; 6	1.9; 8	1.3; 6	1.2; 5	0.8; 2	0.5; 1	0.2; 1	–	5.3; 5	1.9; 0	–	6.4
KeyData/Público	20 Mar	?	67.8	33.6; 146	28.2; 118	14.0; 42	6.4; 10	1.7; 7	1.8; 8	1.4; 6	1.1; 5	0.7; 2	? 1	? 1	–	4.5; 4	2.1; 0	–	5.4
DYM/Henneo	12–16 Mar	1,001	?	35.4; 152/156	29.1; 119/123	12.0; 30/33	6.3; 9/11	–	–	–	–	–	–	–	–	4.5; 4/5	1.6; 0/1	–	6.3
EM-Analytics/Electomanía	8–14 Mar	1,732	?	33.2; 143	29.1; 120	14.4; 41	6.2; 10	1.8; 7	2.0; 8	1.3; 6	1.3; 6	0.8; 2	0.5; 1	0.2; 1	0.1; 0	4.5; 5	2.0; 0	–	4.1
NC Report/La Razón	3–7 Mar	1,500	65.4	34.1; 145/147	28.5; 117/119	14.5; 43/44	5.8; 9/10	1.6; 6	1.8; 8	1.4; 6	1.2; 5	0.8; 2	0.5; 1	0.2; 1	–	4.7; 5/6	–	–	5.6
EM-Analytics/Electomanía	1–7 Mar	1,139	?	33.0; 141	28.5; 119	14.8; 41	6.6; 13	1.8; 7	2.0; 8	1.3; 6	1.3; 6	0.8; 2	0.5; 1	0.2; 1	0.1; 0	4.8; 5	2.2; 0	–	4.5
CIS (Opina 360)	28 Feb–7 Mar	4,018	?	32.6	31.1	12.5	7.4	–	–	–	–	–	–	–	–	3.8	2.2	–	1.5
CIS	28 Feb–7 Mar	4,018	?	29.2	34.5	11.7	7.6	1.7	1.4	1.1	0.9	0.8	0.1	0.1	–	3.8	1.9	–	5.3
Sigma Dos/El Mundo	24 Feb–7 Mar	2,832	?	33.8; 148	27.8; 118	12.9; 40	6.4; 9	1.6; 7	1.8; 8	0.8; 5	0.9; 6	0.9; 2	0.3; 1	0.2; 1	–	5.2; 4	2.9; 1	–	6.0
GESOP/Prensa Ibérica	3–6 Mar	1,000	?	32.1; 139/143	27.0; 114/118	14.6; 45/49	7.5; 11/13	1.8; 7/8	1.4; 6/7	–	–	–	–	–	–	3.3; 3/4	2.5; 0/1	–	5.1
Hamalgama Métrica/Vozpópuli	24–28 Feb	1,000	?	34.3; 148	27.5; 114	14.7; 44	6.1; 10	1.7; 6	1.8; 8	1.3; 6	1.0; 5	0.7; 2	0.5; 1	0.2; 1	–	5.0; 5	1.8; 0	–	6.8
EM-Analytics/Electomanía	22–28 Feb	1,201	?	32.5; 138	28.8; 118	15.5; 46	6.5; 12	1.7; 7	1.9; 8	1.3; 6	1.3; 6	0.7; 2	0.4; 1	0.2; 1	0.1; 0	4.9; 5	2.1; 0	–	3.7
40dB/Prisa	21–24 Feb	2,000	?	32.2	29.6	14.1	5.9	–	–	–	–	–	–	–	–	3.6	1.9	–	2.6
Target Point/El Debate	19–21 Feb	1,007	?	33.1; 143/145	29.9; 122/124	14.2; 42/44	6.4; 9/10	–	–	–	–	–	–	–	–	4.2; 3/4	2.3; 0/1	–	3.2
EM-Analytics/Electomanía	15–21 Feb	1,973	?	33.3; 143	28.2; 116	15.2; 45	6.2; 10	1.7; 7	1.9; 8	1.3; 6	1.3; 6	0.7; 2	0.4; 1	0.2; 1	0.1; 0	5.2; 5	2.4; 0	–	5.1
KeyData/Público	20 Feb	?	67.6	33.9; 147	28.0; 117	14.2; 42	6.1; 9	1.6; 6	1.8; 8	1.4; 6	1.3; 6	0.7; 2	? 1	? 1	–	4.7; 5	1.9; 0	–	5.9
Celeste-Tel/Onda Cero	12–17 Feb	1,100	66.5	34.3; 147	27.9; 115	14.2; 42	6.5; 11	1.7; 6	1.9; 8	1.2; 6	1.1; 5	0.8; 2	0.5; 1	0.2; 1	–	5.4; 6	2.0; 0	–	6.4
SocioMétrica/El Español	12–14 Feb	1,812	?	33.8; 146	27.8; 115	14.3; 41	6.6; 12	1.8; 7	2.1; 8	1.4; 8	1.1; 5	1.0; 2	0.4; 1	0.1; 0	–	4.4; 3	2.1; 0	–	6.0
EM-Analytics/Electomanía	8–13 Feb	2,039	?	32.7; 142	28.4; 116	15.4; 44	6.4; 11	1.7; 7	1.9; 8	1.3; 6	1.3; 6	0.7; 2	0.4; 1	0.2; 1	0.1; 0	5.5; 6	2.6; 0	–	4.3
NC Report/La Razón	4–7 Feb	1,000	65.2	34.8; 149/151	27.9; 114/116	14.3; 41/43	5.6; 8/9	1.6; 6	1.8; 8	1.5; 6	1.1; 5	0.8; 2	0.5; 1	0.2; 1	–	4.7; 5/6	–	–	6.9
EM-Analytics/Electomanía	1–7 Feb	1,179	?	32.5; 139	29.1; 121	15.0; 43	6.0; 10	1.7; 7	2.0; 8	1.3; 6	1.3; 6	0.8; 2	0.5; 1	0.2; 1	0.1; 0	5.2; 5	2.9; 1	–	3.4
KeyData/Público	6 Feb	?	67.7	34.0; 148	28.0; 117	14.1; 42	6.2; 9	1.7; 7	1.7; 7	1.4; 6	1.3; 6	0.7; 2	? 1	? 1	–	4.6; 4	2.1; 0	–	6.0
CIS (Opina 360)	31 Jan–6 Feb	4,042	?	30.8	30.0	15.0	6.6	–	–	–	–	–	–	–	–	4.3	1.6	–	0.8
CIS (Logoslab)	31 Jan–6 Feb	4,042	?	31.0; 135	30.8; 128	14.5; 45	6.4; 8	–	–	–	–	–	–	–	–	4.3; 3	1.7; 0	–	0.2
CIS (SocioMétrica)	31 Jan–6 Feb	4,042	?	33.5; 141	29.1; 124	14.2; 43	6.2; 8	1.6; 7	1.5; 6	1.0; 6	0.8; 3	1.5; 6	0.4; 1	0.1; 0	–	4.6; 5	1.8; 0	–	4.4
CIS	31 Jan–6 Feb	4,042	?	28.1	33.4	13.3	6.4	1.6	1.3	1.3	1.0	0.8	0.3	0.1	–	4.4	1.6	–	5.3
Hamalgama Métrica/Vozpópuli	28–31 Jan	1,000	?	34.5; 150	27.8; 114	14.3; 43	5.9; 9	1.7; 6	1.8; 8	1.3; 6	1.1; 5	0.7; 2	0.5; 1	0.2; 1	–	4.9; 5	1.7; 0	–	6.7
EM-Analytics/Electomanía	25–31 Jan	1,084	?	32.0; 137	28.9; 120	15.6; 46	5.8; 9	1.6; 7	1.9; 8	1.4; 7	1.3; 6	0.8; 2	0.5; 1	0.2; 1	0.1; 0	5.1; 6	2.7; 0	–	3.1
Sigma Dos/El Mundo	24–31 Jan	2,303	?	33.7; 148	27.6; 118	13.1; 42	6.4; 9	1.7; 7	1.7; 7	0.9; 5	1.0; 6	1.0; 2	0.4; 1	0.2; 1	–	4.7; 3	3.2; 1	–	6.1
40dB/Prisa	24–27 Jan	2,000	?	32.6	28.4	14.2	5.9	–	–	–	–	–	–	–	–	3.4	2.5	–	4.2
Target Point/El Debate	22–24 Jan	1,001	?	33.2; 143/145	28.9; 118/120	15.5; 47/49	5.9; 7/9	–	–	–	–	–	–	–	–	5.2; 4/5	1.7; 0	–	4.3
EM-Analytics/Electomanía	18–24 Jan	1,133	?	32.3; 137	29.2; 120	15.3; 44	6.0; 10	1.6; 7	1.7; 7	1.4; 7	1.2; 6	0.8; 2	0.4; 1	0.2; 1	0.1; 0	5.3; 8	2.6; 0	–	3.1
GAD3/ABC	16–23 Jan	1,035	?	34.9; 151	27.3; 109	14.2; 44	6.9; 11	1.9; 7	1.7; 8	1.4; 7	1.1; 6	0.6; 2	0.4; 1	–	–	4.0; 4	2.1; 0	–	7.6
DYM/Henneo	16–20 Jan	1,014	?	34.8; 150/155	28.8; 119/123	12.9; 32/35	6.4; 9/11	–	–	–	–	–	–	–	–	5.0; 3/4	1.0; 0	–	6.0
EM-Analytics/Electomanía	11–17 Jan	1,133	?	32.6; 138	28.8; 120	15.0; 42	5.8; 9	1.7; 7	2.0; 8	1.4; 7	1.2; 6	0.8; 2	0.4; 1	0.2; 1	0.1; 0	4.9; 8	2.8; 1	–	3.8
Celeste-Tel/Onda Cero	7–11 Jan	1,100	66.3	34.1; 147	28.1; 116	14.3; 42	6.2; 10	1.7; 6	1.9; 8	1.3; 6	1.1; 5	0.8; 2	0.5; 1	0.2; 1	–	5.1; 6	2.1; 0	–	6.0
EM-Analytics/Electomanía	27 Dec–10 Jan	4,001	?	32.4; 139	28.7; 118	15.2; 43	5.6; 8	1.7; 7	2.0; 8	1.4; 7	1.2; 6	0.8; 2	0.5; 1	0.2; 1	0.1; 0	4.8; 10	2.7; 0	–	3.7
CIS (Opina 360)	2–9 Jan	4,024	?	32.9	29.7	13.2	6.2	–	–	–	–	–	–	–	–	3.9	2.2	–	3.2
CIS (Logoslab)	2–9 Jan	4,024	?	33.0; 141	29.5; 124	13.0; 40	6.4; 9	–	–	–	–	–	–	–	–	4.0; 4	2.5; 1	–	3.5
CIS (SocioMétrica)	2–9 Jan	4,024	?	33.5; 143	29.5; 124	14.3; 43	5.6; 6	1.3; 6	1.4; 7	1.4; 8	1.0; 5	1.3; 4	–	–	–	3.8; 3	2.9; 1	–	4.0
CIS	2–9 Jan	4,024	?	29.7	31.8	12.4	6.5	1.9	1.4	1.2	1.0	1.4	0.1	0.1	–	3.9	2.4	–	2.1
Hamalgama Métrica/Vozpópuli	31 Dec–3 Jan	1,000	?	34.5; 149	28.3; 116	14.0; 43	5.6; 8	1.7; 6	1.9; 8	1.3; 6	1.1; 5	0.8; 2	0.5; 1	0.2; 1	–	4.7; 5	1.6; 0	–	6.2
EM-Analytics/Electomanía	27 Dec–3 Jan	1,068	?	33.2; 142	29.0; 118	14.8; 41	6.0; 10	1.8; 7	2.0; 8	1.4; 7	1.2; 6	0.8; 2	0.5; 1	0.2; 1	0.1; 0	4.5; 7	2.6; 0	–	4.2

==== Voting preferences ====
The table below lists raw, unweighted voting preferences.

Polling firm/Commissioner	Fieldwork date	Sample size	PP	PSOE	Vox	Sumar	ERC	Junts	EH Bildu	PNV	BNG	CCa	UPN	Adelante Andalucía (2021)	Podemos	SALF	FA	Question	X mark	Lead
40dB/Prisa	17–21 Nov 2026	2,000	22.7	29.3	16.9	(Note: Within FA.)	3.2	1.0	0.8	0.4	1.1	0.4	(Note: Within PP.)	1.6	0.9	1.4	4.9	8.3	3.2	6.6
40dB/Prisa	16–20 Nov 2026	2,000	22.6	29.7	16.3		3.2	1.2	0.7	0.6	1.0	0.3		1.3	1.0	1.3	5.0	8.5	3.1	7.1
More in Common (Note: Recalculated to include abstentionists, which were excluded and shown separately from the poll's raw figures.)	16–19 Nov 2026	2,315	22.6	26.4	17.8		–	–	–	–	–	–		–	1.2	1.6	5.2	8.6	3.2	3.8
40dB/Prisa	15–19 Nov 2026	2,000	22.6	29.2	16.9		2.9	1.2	0.8	0.7	1.0	0.3		1.4	1.0	1.4	4.6	8.9	3.2	6.6
40dB/Prisa	14–18 Nov 2026	2,000	22.9	29.6	16.3		3.1	1.2	0.8	0.5	0.9	0.2		1.3	1.1	1.5	4.6	9.1	3.2	6.7
40dB/Prisa	13–17 Nov 2026	2,000	22.2	30.0	15.9		3.2	1.2	0.9	0.7	1.0	0.2		1.0	0.9	1.6	4.6	8.8	3.6	7.8
40dB/Prisa	12–16 Nov 2026	2,000	21.9	29.4	16.3		2.9	1.1	1.2	0.5	1.1	0.2		1.2	1.0	1.8	4.7	8.6	3.8	7.5
40dB/Prisa	10–15 Nov 2026	2,500	20.9	28.8	17.6		2.9	1.1	0.7	0.6	1.1	0.4		1.0	1.2	1.7	4.7	9.3	3.7	7.9
40dB/Prisa	10–14 Nov 2026	2,000	20.3	28.2	18.6		2.7	1.1	0.7	0.6	1.2	0.5		1.1	1.2	1.6	5.0	9.2	3.7	7.9
40dB/Prisa	10–13 Nov 2026	1,500	20.2	27.7	19.1		2.6	1.1	0.6	0.5	1.2	0.4		1.2	1.4	1.5	4.9	9.9	3.5	7.5
40dB/Prisa	10–12 Nov 2026	1,000	20.3	26.5	20.1		2.8	1.1	0.4	0.6	1.0	0.5		0.8	1.5	1.5	4.6	11.1	3.0	6.2
Winston/Artículo14	5–8 Nov 2026	1,501	20.5	17.8	12.7		–	–	–	–	–	–		–	1.2	1.9	5.2	–	–	2.7
SW Demoscopia/La Séptima	26 Oct–7 Nov 2026	5,000	23.8	25.5	15.9		–	–	–	–	–	–		–	–	–	5.9	13.0	–	1.7
DYM/Henneo	4–6 Nov 2026	1,025	24.7	27.5	12.0		–	–	–	–	–	–		–	1.5	1.0	3.2	14.0	2.7	2.8
SW Demoscopia/La Séptima	26 Oct–6 Nov 2026	4,500	24.1	25.5	15.7		–	–	–	–	–	–		–	–	–	6.1	12.8	–	1.4
SW Demoscopia/La Séptima	26 Oct–5 Nov 2026	4,000	24.0	25.2	15.6		–	–	–	–	–	–		–	–	–	6.0	13.1	–	1.2
40dB/Prisa	2–4 Nov 2026	2,000	20.6	28.7	18.0		3.0	1.1	1.2	0.6	0.9	0.4		1.4	1.2	2.2	4.6	8.5	3.6	8.1
SW Demoscopia/La Séptima	26 Oct–4 Nov 2026	3,500	24.2	25.0	15.7		–	–	–	–	–	–		–	–	–	6.0	13.5	–	0.8
CIS	7–30 Oct 2026	45,074	17.2	28.7	15.0		2.4	0.7	1.3	0.4	0.7	0.2		1.1	0.8	1.3	5.0	18.1	1.7	11.5
More in Common	21–25 Oct 2026	2,210	19.5	23.3	18.4		–	–	–	–	–	–		–	1.5	2.0	4.3	11.9	4.0	3.8
Winston/Artículo14	21–23 Oct 2026	1,200	18.0	18.2	13.5		–	–	–	–	–	–		–	1.8	1.5	3.9	–	–	0.2
40dB/Prisa	7–8 Oct 2026	800	19.7	22.3	20.6		2.0	1.8	1.2	0.8	0.8	0.3	0.3	1.3		2.0	8.3	9.6	4.1	1.7
40dB/Prisa	7–8 Oct 2026	800	20.5	23.0	20.1	4.2	1.7	1.6	0.9	0.7	0.7	0.3	0.2	0.8	1.8	2.1	–	11.4	4.1	2.5
GESOP/Prensa Ibérica	6–8 Oct 2026	1,000	17.9	22.1	14.9	6.8	2.8	1.3	0.8	0.9	0.9	0.4	–	–	1.8	2.3	–	15.6	2.7	4.2
DYM/Henneo	5–7 Oct 2026	1,011	19.8	25.2	16.8	3.0	–	–	–	–	–	–	–	–	1.6	1.3	–	17.3	3.5	5.4
CIS	1–6 Oct 2026	5,025	14.7	25.3	11.6	4.5	1.8	0.8	0.9	0.4	0.7	0.1	0.0	0.4	2.2	1.1	0.8	19.9	5.1	10.6
SocioMétrica/El Español	1–3 Oct 2026	1,000	19.5	16.1	14.4	5.4	–	–	–	–	–	–	–	–	3.6	2.8	–	11.3	19.5	3.4
Winston/Artículo14	29 Sep–1 Oct 2026	1,201	18.5	15.8	14.9	5.0	1.0	1.0	1.0	1.0	–	–	–	–	3.2	0.9	–	19.0	9.0	2.7
40dB/Prisa	25–28 Sep 2026	2,000	19.6	22.4	19.1	4.4	1.7	1.4	1.2	0.6	0.9	0.4	0.1	–	2.6	2.2	–	11.0	5.5	2.8
SocioMétrica/El Español	24–26 Sep 2026	1,200	24.5	19.7	13.3	3.7	–	–	–	–	–	–	–	–	2.4	1.6	–	12.6	16.0	4.8
CIS	17–25 Sep 2026	6,028	14.1	24.8	10.7	5.9	1.5	0.6	0.8	0.4	1.0	0.1	0.0	0.5	3.3	1.6	0.4	17.6	7.1	10.7
DYM/Henneo	16–21 Sep 2026	1,017	21.4	23.0	15.3	3.7	–	–	–	–	–	–	–	–	2.3	1.8	–	15.1	5.1	1.6
CIS	10–17 Sep 2026	6,040	15.9	21.2	10.7	4.7	1.8	0.5	0.9	0.3	0.6	0.2	0.0	0.5	1.9	0.9	–	24.1	5.8	5.3
CIS	4–10 Sep 2026	6,038	16.5	21.8	11.7	4.1	1.6	0.5	0.7	0.3	0.8	0.2	0.1	0.4	1.4	1.3	0.3	23.6	5.6	5.3
CIS	1–4 Sep 2026	4,042	18.3	23.3	12.0	4.6	1.5	0.5	1.0	0.4	0.6	0.1	0.1	0.5	3.0	1.5	0.5	16.9	5.9	5.0
40dB/Prisa	31 Aug–2 Sep 2026	2,000	20.3	23.1	17.3	5.2	2.4	1.3	0.7	0.8	0.7	0.4	0.3	–	2.3	2.3	–	10.9	5.3	2.8
More in Common	24–28 Aug 2026	2,144	19.7	25.2	16.4	4.0	2.1	1.2	1.1	0.5	0.7	0.6	0.1	–	2.1	1.6	–	10.1	5.9	5.5
CIS	24–29 Jul 2026	3,004	15.2	23.3	7.2	4.1	1.3	0.7	0.6	0.6	0.6	0.3	–	0.7	1.7	0.6	–	24.1	8.1	8.1
CIS	13–21 Jul 2026	6,029	18.7	26.5	10.0	4.1	1.5	0.8	0.8	0.5	0.5	0.2	–	0.5	1.5	1.2	0.6	18.7	5.4	7.8
DYM/Henneo	15–20 Jul 2026	1,014	23.9	24.0	10.1	3.3	–	–	–	–	–	–	–	–	1.9	1.7	–	15.8	6.7	0.1
CIS	6–13 Jul 2026	6,000	16.7	24.2	10.4	4.3	1.5	0.5	1.0	0.5	0.7	0.1	0.0	0.5	2.0	1.3	0.5	16.9	7.3	7.5
GESOP/Prensa Ibérica	6–9 Jul 2026	1,001	16.4	22.2	12.1	6.6	2.4	1.0	1.5	0.5	0.6	0.3	0.2	–	3.3	2.4	–	11.2	7.6	5.8
CIS	1–6 Jul 2026	4,020	18.6	25.4	11.5	4.4	1.8	0.5	0.5	0.8	0.7	0.1	0.1	0.6	1.8	2.0	0.8	18.5	5.8	6.8
CIS	22–30 Jun 2026	6,019	14.8	20.0	9.2	4.3	1.4	0.5	0.6	0.3	0.5	0.1	0.0	–	1.8	0.9	0.6	28.5	6.0	5.2
40dB/Prisa	26–29 Jun 2026	2,000	20.1	23.2	17.0	5.2	2.9	1.1	0.8	0.7	0.8	0.4	0.0	–	3.4	2.1	–	9.0	5.1	3.1
More in Common	24–28 Jun 2026	2,277	21.1	22.5	15.4	5.4	1.3	1.3	0.9	0.9	0.6	0.4	0.1	–	2.2	1.9	–	11.7	5.7	1.4
CIS	18–22 Jun 2026	3,023	16.3	19.4	7.8	4.3	1.8	0.8	0.6	0.6	0.8	0.2	0.0	–	2.0	1.0	1.0	23.5	8.6	3.1
CIS	11–18 Jun 2026	5,005	15.0	25.7	9.0	5.1	1.4	0.6	1.0	0.4	0.5	0.1	0.0	–	2.9	1.1	0.4	21.4	5.4	10.7
CIS	9–12 Jun 2026	4,027	18.2	25.1	13.6	3.7	1.4	0.8	0.8	0.5	0.5	0.1	0.0	–	2.4	1.7	0.8	17.2	4.5	6.9
CIS	1–4 Jun 2026	4,024	19.3	23.0	11.6	4.2	1.3	0.7	0.8	0.3	0.7	0.1	0.0	–	1.9	1.4	1.0	18.5	5.8	3.7
40dB/Prisa	28 May–1 Jun 2026	2,000	20.7	23.5	17.3	5.3	2.4	1.1	1.4	0.6	1.0	0.6	0.1	–	2.0	2.0	–	10.5	4.9	2.8
CIS	21–25 May 2026	3,028	15.1	20.3	7.8	3.8	1.7	0.5	0.7	0.7	0.6	0.2	0.0	–	1.6	1.0	0.9	25.9	8.5	5.2
DYM/Henneo	20–22 May 2026	1,009	28.4	26.3	11.2	5.0	–	–	–	–	–	–	–	–	1.5	1.7	–	13.5	3.2	2.1
CIS	4–19 May 2026	3,493	15.4	22.8	10.1	3.8	1.5	–	0.3	0.6	0.4	0.4	0.0	–	1.9	1.8	–	23.1	7.4	7.4
CIS	4–18 May 2026	4,016	18.0	28.5	12.7	4.4	1.8	0.5	0.7	0.4	0.6	0.1	0.1	–	1.8	1.8	0.7	15.1	4.9	10.5
CIS	22–30 Apr 2026	6,001	15.4	25.8	10.7	4.3	1.5	0.5	0.7	0.4	0.6	0.1	0.0	–	2.1	1.2	1.0	20.0	5.9	10.4
40dB/Prisa	24–27 Apr 2026	2,000	18.9	24.3	17.8	4.4	2.2	1.7	1.1	0.9	0.9	0.4	0.1	–	2.1	2.2	–	10.0	5.1	5.4
More in Common	21–25 Apr 2026	2,547	21.2	27.1	15.4	5.8	–	–	–	–	–	–	–	–	2.3	1.9	–	13.7		5.9
CIS	17–22 Apr 2026	3,015	14.7	23.6	6.6	4.3	1.1	0.7	0.8	0.6	0.6	0.1	0.1	–	1.4	0.6	0.8	24.7	9.5	8.9
CIS	6–10 Apr 2026	4,020	15.7	27.4	10.7	4.1	1.8	0.6	1.0	0.5	0.5	0.1	0.0	–	1.5	1.1	1.3	18.2	6.1	11.7
Ipsos/La Vanguardia	23 Mar–8 Apr 2026	1,058	20.6	19.1	14.1	5.2	1.3	0.9	1.2	0.7	0.4	0.3	0.1	–	1.9	1.7	–	17.2	6.3	1.5
CIS	26 Mar–1 Apr 2026	2,602	13.6	21.8	7.2	3.7	0.6	0.6	0.6	0.3	0.6	0.1	0.0	–	1.8	1.0	–	30.9	8.3	8.2
40dB/Prisa	24–25 Mar 2026	2,000	18.9	24.3	19.0	5.0	2.7	1.3	1.1	0.6	1.1	0.5	0.1	–	2.4	1.6	–	9.4	4.4	5.3
DYM/Henneo	19–23 Mar 2026	1,002	22.8	25.1	11.6	4.7	–	–	–	–	–	–	–	–	1.5	1.4	–	10.1	5.7	2.3
CIS	16–20 Mar 2026	3,016	16.5	21.7	8.3	4.2	1.2	0.6	0.9	0.5	0.7	–	0.1	–	2.2	1.0	–	23.0	8.5	5.2
CIS	5–12 Mar 2026	4,009	12.4	23.2	9.5	3.5	1.6	0.8	0.5	0.3	0.4	0.1	0.1	–	2.0	1.0	–	27.2	6.9	10.8
CIS	2–6 Mar 2026	4,016	15.9	22.4	12.1	4.9	1.7	0.4	0.8	0.2	0.9	0.0	0.0	–	2.2	1.6	–	17.9	6.7	6.5
CIS	20–27 Feb 2026	5,015	14.2	20.3	13.7	5.0	1.6	0.5	0.7	0.4	0.5	0.2	0.0	–	2.0	1.5	–	21.9	7.1	6.1
40dB/Prisa	20–23 Feb 2026	2,000	18.1	23.4	20.1	4.8	1.8	1.6	0.9	0.5	0.9	0.3	0.1	–	3.0	2.0	–	10.1	4.7	3.3
CIS	13–18 Feb 2026	3,004	14.3	19.5	8.4	4.9	1.7	0.5	0.7	0.6	1.0	0.1	–	–	2.0	1.0	–	25.1	7.5	5.2
CIS	2–6 Feb 2026	4,027	16.1	23.6	13.7	4.8	1.6	0.9	0.7	0.4	0.6	0.1	0.1	–	2.9	1.8	–	17.2	6.4	7.5
40dB/Prisa	30 Jan–2 Feb 2026	2,000	18.7	22.6	16.9	5.9	2.4	1.5	0.8	0.7	0.8	0.3	0.2	–	3.3	2.3	–	10.6	5.3	3.9
CIS	22–30 Jan 2026	5,007	14.2	23.3	11.4	5.0	1.9	0.4	0.6	0.7	0.4	0.1	0.0	–	2.6	1.3	–	21.3	8.1	9.1
DYM/Henneo	23–24 Jan 2026	1,003	21.8	20.1	9.5	4.5	–	–	–	–	–	–	–	–	1.5	1.2	–	19.8	7.6	1.7
CIS	19–22 Jan 2026	3,013	17.1	17.5	8.8	5.1	1.9	0.8	0.8	0.5	0.9	0.2	0.0	–	2.7	1.2	–	23.4	8.6	0.4
GESOP/Prensa Ibérica	12–15 Jan 2026	1,002	17.6	20.2	12.7	6.6	2.8	0.6	0.8	0.9	0.4	–	–	–	3.5	1.5	–	14.3	8.2	2.6
SocioMétrica/El Español	7–10 Jan 2026	1,300	19.3	20.3	18.6	5.9	–	–	–	–	–	–	–	–	4.2	2.5	–	15.7	6.5	1.0
CIS	5–10 Jan 2026	4,006	15.9	23.2	13.8	4.8	1.3	0.7	1.0	0.5	0.8	0.2	0.0	–	2.5	1.3	–	18.6	6.3	7.3
40dB/Prisa	29 Dec–5 Jan 2026	2,000	18.6	21.3	17.4	5.3	1.5	2.0	1.0	0.8	0.5	0.3	0.3	–	2.9	3.1	–	11.0	6.2	2.7
CIS	18–23 Dec 2025	3,022	17.5	22.4	13.6	4.7	1.5	0.7	0.7	0.9	0.6	0.3	0.2	–	2.5	1.1	–	18.5	6.6	4.9
CIS	15–18 Dec 2025	3,013	15.5	17.9	9.7	4.7	1.5	0.7	0.6	0.6	0.9	0.1	–	–	2.9	0.8	–	23.8	9.5	2.4
CIS	9–15 Dec 2025	4,031	13.0	23.2	11.3	5.5	1.6	0.6	0.5	0.4	0.7	0.2	0.0	–	2.6	0.9	–	21.6	7.6	10.2
SocioMétrica/El Español	5–7 Dec 2025	1,100	20.1	20.5	16.0	6.1	–	–	–	–	–	–	–	–	3.7	2.1	–	17.9	7.1	0.4
CIS	1–5 Dec 2025	4,017	15.2	23.3	12.4	5.5	1.3	0.5	1.0	0.6	0.6	0.1	0.1	–	3.0	1.7	–	18.0	6.5	8.1
40dB/Prisa	27 Nov–1 Dec 2025	2,500	18.9	22.7	18.7	4.9	1.8	1.7	0.9	1.0	0.8	0.3	0.1	–	3.1	2.8	–	9.5	5.3	3.8
CIS	24–28 Nov 2025	3,017	14.0	19.8	10.5	4.6	1.6	0.9	1.1	0.7	0.7	0.2	–	–	2.5	0.7	–	23.1	9.4	5.8
DYM/Henneo	12–14 Nov 2025	1,000	20.8	22.6	14.0	4.8	–	–	–	–	–	–	–	–	1.2	1.4	–	15.7	6.6	1.8
CIS	3–12 Nov 2025	4,028	15.2	23.3	13.6	4.9	1.2	0.8	0.9	0.4	0.9	0.1	0.1	–	2.9	0.4	–	19.0	6.6	8.1
CIS	3–11 Nov 2025	2,052	15.1	22.8	12.1	6.0	1.6	0.9	0.7	0.6	0.6	0.3	0.0	–	2.2	0.8	–	19.3	8.4	7.7
SocioMétrica/El Español	6–8 Nov 2025	1,100	21.5	20.5	15.3	6.5	–	–	–	–	–	–	–	–	3.7	2.1	–	18.7	5.4	1.0
Opina 360/Telecinco	31 Oct–4 Nov 2025	1,202	21.2	23.1	15.2	6.0	1.3	1.1	0.5	0.6	0.5	0.1	–	–	2.6	1.5	–	9.5	7.1	1.9
CIS	29–31 Oct 2025	2,642	13.9	19.6	8.9	5.5	1.6	0.6	0.6	0.3	0.5	0.1	0.1	–	2.4	0.8	–	24.7	9.6	5.7
40dB/Prisa	24–26 Oct 2025	2,000	17.6	21.9	17.8	5.6	2.0	1.6	1.1	1.0	1.1	0.3	0.2	–	2.9	2.2	–	10.9	5.1	4.1
SocioMétrica/El Español	6–10 Oct 2025	900	19.9	19.2	15.0	6.2	–	–	–	–	–	–	–	–	4.1	2.4	–	20.3	6.4	0.7
GESOP/Prensa Ibérica	3–9 Oct 2025	1,000	15.6	22.8	13.4	5.7	1.9	0.8	1.4	0.5	0.5	0.2	–	–	3.0	1.2	–	13.7	8.5	7.2
CIS	1–7 Oct 2025	4,029	13.1	25.9	12.6	5.5	1.2	0.7	0.6	0.6	0.7	0.1	0.1	–	3.7	0.9	–	18.5	6.0	12.8
Opina 360/Antena 3	25–30 Sep 2025	1,203	18.5	24.3	16.7	5.0	1.9	0.8	1.1	0.7	0.9	0.2	–	–	3.6	1.2	–	14.7	4.4	5.8
40dB/Prisa	26–28 Sep 2025	2,000	17.9	23.0	17.1	5.4	1.8	1.6	1.2	0.8	1.2	0.4	0.1	–	2.4	1.5	–	10.8	6.4	5.1
CIS	12–17 Sep 2025	3,016	14.1	20.8	8.6	4.9	1.0	0.5	0.9	0.4	0.7	0.1	–	–	2.5	0.7	–	25.4	9.3	6.7
DYM/Henneo	10–15 Sep 2025	1,016	22.5	24.1	12.9	3.7	–	–	–	–	–	–	–	–	1.5	1.3	–	13.7	8.6	1.6
CIS	8–12 Sep 2025	3,004	11.2	17.9	9.2	3.8	0.9	0.7	0.5	0.3	0.5	0.1	0.0	–	2.2	0.9	–	34.4	8.1	6.7
CIS	1–6 Sep 2025	4,122	16.4	23.7	12.8	5.6	1.3	0.5	0.7	0.3	0.5	0.1	0.0	–	3.2	1.2	–	17.5	7.1	7.3
40dB/Prisa	29 Aug–1 Sep 2025	2,000	16.7	20.7	17.6	5.6	1.6	1.7	1.0	0.8	0.9	0.4	0.1	–	3.2	1.6	–	11.4	7.3	3.1
SocioMétrica/El Español	26–29 Aug 2025	1,100	21.4	14.0	11.8	6.1	–	–	–	–	–	–	–	–	3.3	2.4	–	18.8	17.4	7.4
CIS	28–31 Jul 2025	2,896	15.4	23.2	11.5	4.8	0.7	0.8	0.7	0.3	0.6	0.0	0.0	–	2.3	1.1	–	23.5	6.4	7.8
CIS	21–24 Jul 2025	2,433	13.7	20.7	7.8	4.9	0.8	0.8	0.5	0.3	0.7	0.1	–	–	2.4	0.8	–	24.3	10.7	7.0
SocioMétrica/El Español	21–24 Jul 2025	1,100	22.8	13.4	12.3	5.0	–	–	–	–	–	–	–	–	3.1	2.9	–	18.4	17.1	9.4
CIS	7–16 Jul 2025	4,004	16.4	20.0	12.8	5.8	1.2	0.6	1.0	0.6	0.5	0.2	0.0	–	2.8	0.8	–	16.9	7.9	3.6
CIS	1–7 Jul 2025	4,018	18.8	18.3	14.0	5.3	1.2	0.6	0.6	0.5	0.5	0.2	0.1	–	3.3	1.2	–	20.3	5.5	0.5
40dB/Prisa	27–30 Jun 2025	2,000	21.6	21.1	15.8	5.1	1.3	1.4	1.0	0.9	0.8	0.4	0.1	–	3.4	2.8	–	10.5	5.3	0.5
CIS	25–30 Jun 2025	2,427	18.4	19.4	12.8	4.7	1.3	0.7	0.5	0.5	0.4	0.1	–	–	3.5	1.4	–	23.1	6.6	1.0
CIS	19–25 Jun 2025	3,015	18.6	16.6	7.5	4.9	1.3	0.6	0.6	0.5	0.7	–	0.0	–	3.2	1.0	–	25.4	9.6	2.0
SocioMétrica/El Español	18–21 Jun 2025	1,150	23.1	22.0	12.9	6.4	–	–	–	–	–	–	–	–	3.8	–	–	9.2	6.4	1.1
CIS	12–19 Jun 2025	4,004	15.7	22.0	10.7	5.1	1.0	0.4	0.6	0.5	0.6	0.1	0.0	–	3.0	1.1	–	22.5	8.4	6.3
DYM/Henneo	17 Jun 2025	1,042	24.0	20.1	11.1	4.8	–	–	–	–	–	–	–	–	1.4	1.3	–	14.8	7.6	3.9
GESOP/Prensa Ibérica	10–12 Jun 2025	1,002	18.0	22.0	10.9	5.4	1.4	0.8	1.1	0.9	0.4	0.2	–	–	2.7	1.5	–	15.8	8.7	4.0
CIS	8 May–12 Jun 2025	15,017	18.7	22.3	9.3	4.3	1.1	0.6	0.7	0.6	0.7	0.2	0.0	–	2.7	1.0	–	23.1	7.1	3.6
CIS	2–7 Jun 2025	4,013	18.1	23.8	9.1	4.5	0.6	0.8	0.8	0.4	0.4	0.3	0.1	–	3.1	1.0	–	20.2	7.1	5.7
40dB/Prisa	23–26 May 2025	2,000	20.1	23.1	15.6	4.5	1.6	1.5	1.1	1.1	0.7	0.4	0.2	–	3.3	1.9	–	11.1	6.1	3.0
SocioMétrica/El Español	19–22 May 2025	1,812	23.6	21.8	11.7	5.3	–	–	–	–	–	–	–	–	3.9	–	–	9.8	6.8	1.8
Ipsos/La Vanguardia	15–21 May 2025	2,000	20.3	22.9	10.0	5.4	1.2	1.0	0.5	0.8	0.6	0.2	0.0	–	2.5	1.2	–	14.6	11.7	2.6
DYM/Henneo	14–19 May 2025	1,057	27.9	22.6	9.4	3.2	–	–	–	–	–	–	–	–	1.7	1.4	–	15.1	6.6	5.3
CIS	5–8 May 2025	4,018	20.3	22.5	10.0	4.4	1.1	0.5	0.4	0.5	0.7	0.2	0.1	–	3.2	1.2	–	18.5	7.4	2.2
CIS	29–30 Apr 2025	1,752	15.0	19.0	8.7	3.1	0.8	1.0	0.6	0.2	0.4	–	–	–	1.8	0.7	–	28.5	10.7	4.0
40dB/Prisa	24–27 Apr 2025	2,000	21.7	23.0	13.3	4.2	1.8	1.5	0.5	1.1	0.7	0.5	0.1	–	2.8	2.3	–	12.1	6.7	1.3
SocioMétrica/El Español	21–25 Apr 2025	1,000	22.3	21.4	11.2	5.0	–	–	–	–	–	–	–	–	4.2	–	–	10.9	8.7	0.9
CIS	8–15 Apr 2025	4,010	17.8	22.0	11.7	4.6	1.0	1.1	0.8	0.3	0.5	0.0	–	–	3.5	1.1	–	19.2	6.9	4.2
CIS	1–8 Apr 2025	4,009	18.5	23.5	11.1	4.3	1.1	0.7	0.6	0.5	0.6	0.3	0.1	–	2.9	1.4	–	18.6	6.7	5.0
40dB/Prisa	28–31 Mar 2025	2,000	20.0	22.7	14.6	4.2	1.5	1.9	1.1	0.9	1.0	0.3	0.2	–	3.6	3.1	–	9.8	6.7	2.7
CIS	7–31 Mar 2025	16,537	22.2	26.1	9.2	4.0	1.1	0.8	1.2	0.9	0.8	0.1	0.1	–	2.9	1.6	–	18.7	4.8	3.9
SocioMétrica/El Español	19–21 Mar 2025	1,903	21.6	22.6	10.5	5.5	–	–	–	–	–	–	–	–	3.3	3.1	–	12.7	8.0	1.0
DYM/Henneo	12–16 Mar 2025	1,001	23.7	23.4	8.2	3.2	–	–	–	–	–	–	–	–	1.5	1.8	–	16.0	6.3	0.3
CIS	28 Feb–7 Mar 2025	4,018	18.9	23.4	8.8	4.9	1.1	1.0	0.5	0.4	0.6	0.0	0.1	–	2.6	1.5	–	20.2	8.4	4.5
GESOP/Prensa Ibérica	3–6 Mar 2025	1,000	19.6	20.1	10.3	6.0	1.3	1.4	1.2	0.9	0.5	0.4	0.1	–	3.3	1.7	–	13.2	9.8	0.5
CIS	21 Feb–3 Mar 2025	4,012	16.3	21.2	9.6	4.4	0.6	0.6	0.7	0.7	1.0	0.1	–	–	2.5	1.4	–	23.6	9.3	4.9
40dB/Prisa	21–24 Feb 2025	2,000	19.4	22.8	14.6	4.6	1.6	1.6	1.3	0.8	0.8	0.3	0.2	–	3.6	2.1	–	12.1	6.9	3.4
SocioMétrica/El Español	12–14 Feb 2025	1,812	18.5	20.9	11.7	6.4	–	–	–	–	–	–	–	–	5.0	–	–	10.2	8.8	2.4
CIS	31 Jan–6 Feb 2025	4,042	17.4	23.8	9.7	4.8	1.0	0.8	0.7	0.7	0.6	0.2	0.1	–	3.4	1.2	–	19.3	8.1	6.4
CIS	22–30 Jan 2025	3,856	15.4	19.9	7.4	5.0	0.9	0.8	0.6	0.5	0.5	0.2	0.0	–	3.2	0.8	–	26.1	10.6	4.5
40dB/Prisa	24–27 Jan 2025	2,000	20.9	21.5	14.8	5.2	1.2	1.9	1.0	0.9	0.6	0.4	0.3	–	3.6	2.6	–	10.8	6.2	0.6
DYM/Henneo	16–20 Jan 2025	1,014	24.7	24.2	8.6	3.6	–	–	–	–	–	–	–	–	2.4	1.0	–	14.6	7.7	0.5
CIS	10–16 Jan 2025	5,006	18.9	23.0	8.9	4.7	1.0	1.4	0.6	0.4	0.8	0.3	0.0	–	3.1	1.5	–	19.5	7.8	4.1
CIS	2–9 Jan 2025	4,024	19.8	21.5	8.4	4.2	1.0	1.0	0.8	0.7	1.3	0.1	0.1	–	2.7	1.6	–	20.5	8.3	1.7
40dB/Prisa	20–26 Dec 2024	2,000	21.2	22.3	14.0	3.9	1.6	1.8	0.8	0.9	0.9	0.6	0.1	–	3.6	2.5	–	8.9	7.9	1.1
CIS	12–18 Dec 2024	2,562	14.3	21.5	8.8	3.8	1.1	1.0	0.7	0.7	0.7	0.0	–	–	3.4	1.7	–	29.2	5.5	7.2
CIS	2–9 Dec 2024	4,621	18.1	20.5	8.1	4.2	1.1	0.8	0.7	0.7	0.7	0.1	0.1	–	3.0	1.9	–	21.7	8.9	2.4
GESOP/Prensa Ibérica	2–4 Dec 2024	1,001	18.8	22.9	9.5	5.9	1.8	1.7	1.4	0.8	0.5	0.2	0.3	–	2.5	1.6	–	10.7	11.8	4.1
CIS	20–28 Nov 2024	3,858	16.3	22.1	6.8	4.0	1.4	0.7	0.6	0.4	1.0	0.9	–	–	2.6	2.1	–	25.1	8.7	5.8
40dB/Prisa	25–27 Nov 2024	2,000	21.5	23.9	13.7	4.0	1.7	1.9	1.0	1.0	0.9	0.5	0.1	–	2.7	3.3	–	9.5	6.1	2.4
SocioMétrica/El Español	22–24 Nov 2024	1,227	24.3	21.8	9.2	5.8	–	–	–	–	–	–	–	–	2.6	–	–	8.7	7.9	2.5
Ipsos/La Vanguardia	18–22 Nov 2024	1,178	18.1	16.8	8.1	3.9	1.4	1.3	0.7	0.9	0.5	0.4	–	–	1.8	1.1	–	16.7	20.4	1.3
CIS	8–14 Nov 2024	3,801	14.4	19.8	7.3	3.6	1.4	0.6	0.6	0.5	0.6	0.1	0.1	–	3.0	2.1	–	26.4	9.8	5.4
DYM/Henneo	8–11 Nov 2024	1,015	25.0	22.0	8.1	3.8	–	–	–	–	–	–	–	–	2.6	1.7	–	15.1	6.8	3.0
CIS	2–7 Nov 2024	4,010	17.1	21.2	9.2	4.6	0.9	1.0	0.6	0.4	0.7	0.2	0.0	–	2.5	1.5	–	20.9	10.9	4.1
CIS	11–21 Oct 2024	3,928	21.3	18.3	8.9	5.7	1.2	1.3	0.7	0.4	1.1	0.3	0.0	–	3.7	2.2	–	16.8	8.3	3.0
DYM/Henneo	16–18 Oct 2024	1,000	28.1	23.7	7.8	4.2	–	–	–	–	–	–	–	–	1.3	1.2	–	13.1	8.1	4.4
CIS	1–11 Oct 2024	4,003	18.4	20.4	9.0	3.7	0.8	0.8	0.7	0.5	0.8	0.1	0.0	–	2.5	1.7	–	26.9	8.2	2.0
CIS	1–11 Oct 2024	4,005	21.4	22.6	9.5	4.7	1.1	0.9	0.6	0.6	0.7	0.2	0.1	–	2.4	1.6	–	18.9	7.9	1.2
40dB/Prisa	25–27 Sep 2024	2,000	24.1	23.2	12.2	5.0	1.1	2.7	0.9	0.8	0.6	0.4	0.2	–	3.8	3.6	–	8.8	5.0	0.9
CIS	20–27 Sep 2024	3,701	15.7	23.0	6.8	4.8	1.6	0.8	0.3	0.3	0.6	0.1	–	–	2.4	1.3	–	23.9	10.4	7.3
GESOP/Prensa Ibérica	23–26 Sep 2024	1,004	22.3	20.9	9.1	9.5	1.1	1.8	–	–	–	–	–	–	2.7	1.7	–	11.9	7.7	1.4
CIS	11–19 Sep 2024	5,742	18.3	21.3	6.7	4.6	1.1	0.8	0.6	0.6	0.7	0.3	0.1	–	2.4	2.0	–	25.4	8.7	3.0
Simple Lógica/elDiario.es	1–13 Sep 2024	1,032	22.5	19.5	7.7	6.2	–	–	–	–	–	–	–	–	2.4	3.5	–	7.4	21.2	3.0
CIS	2–6 Sep 2024	4,027	19.3	23.7	9.4	5.5	0.9	0.9	0.6	0.6	0.6	0.2	0.1	–	2.6	2.0	–	19.4	7.1	4.4
SocioMétrica/El Español	26–31 Aug 2024	2,310	21.8	22.0	11.3	6.8	–	–	–	–	–	–	–	–	3.7	3.8	–	8.7	9.8	0.2
40dB/Prisa	19–23 Aug 2024	2,000	22.0	23.1	11.9	5.6	1.3	1.8	0.7	1.1	0.9	0.3	0.1	–	2.9	3.7	–	11.3	6.3	1.1
Simple Lógica/elDiario.es	1–9 Aug 2024	1,055	22.5	19.4	8.0	7.0	–	–	–	–	–	–	–	–	1.9	3.7	–	7.3	20.9	3.1
CIS	18–26 Jul 2024	4,024	18.0	22.4	6.3	4.7	0.9	0.8	0.6	0.4	0.5	0.2	–	–	2.1	1.7	–	24.9	9.3	4.4
SocioMétrica/El Español	18–20 Jul 2024	1,200	22.4	22.0	10.2	6.0	–	–	–	–	–	–	–	–	3.5	5.0	–	8.9	8.9	0.4
CIS	5–11 Jul 2024	4,005	20.0	23.3	6.7	5.7	1.4	1.1	0.7	0.3	0.8	0.3	0.0	–	3.3	2.7	–	16.5	9.6	3.3
Simple Lógica/elDiario.es	1–10 Jul 2024	1,026	23.2	23.0	8.0	7.2	–	–	–	–	–	–	–	–	2.0	2.6	–	8.2	18.2	0.2
CIS	1–4 Jul 2024	4,007	18.8	24.0	9.9	5.2	1.0	1.2	0.8	0.6	0.6	0.2	0.1	–	3.2	2.1	–	18.7	7.3	5.2
CIS	26–28 Jun 2024	2,843	18.6	20.3	7.6	4.3	0.9	1.0	0.9	0.7	0.7	0.4	0.0	–	2.5	2.8	–	24.7	8.8	1.7
40dB/Prisa	21–24 Jun 2024	2,000	21.2	26.0	12.3	5.0	1.1	2.1	0.7	1.2	1.0	0.3	0.1	–	3.5	3.8	–	9.4	6.0	4.8
CIS	17–21 Jun 2024	3,010	25.0	23.9	9.8	5.3	1.0	1.2	0.8	0.5	0.7	0.1	0.2	–	3.5	4.5	–	15.1	4.0	1.1
CIS	6–11 Jun 2024	4,006	17.0	25.3	6.6	6.9	1.2	1.5	0.6	0.4	0.5	0.1	0.0	–	2.4	1.7	–	22.0	7.1	8.3
Simple Lógica/elDiario.es	1–11 Jun 2024	1,032	22.5	21.1	8.2	5.7	–	–	–	–	–	–	–	–	2.7	–	–	15.4	16.0	1.4
2024 EP election (Note: Does not include non-resident citizens.)	9 Jun 2024	—N/a	16.7	14.8	4.7	2.3	1.0	1.2	0.8	0.5	0.5	0.2	–	–	1.6	2.2	–	—N/a	50.8	1.9
CIS	31 May–6 Jun 2024	4,011	20.2	24.9	8.6	6.7	1.2	1.3	0.7	0.6	0.7	0.3	0.0	–	2.9	1.1	–	17.1	6.8	4.7
GESOP/Prensa Ibérica	27–31 May 2024	1,013	23.9	25.1	6.9	7.8	2.1	1.6	1.2	1.0	0.5	–	0.1	–	2.1	–	–	10.7	6.3	1.2
40dB/Prisa	28–30 May 2024	2,000	22.6	25.8	12.4	6.0	1.5	2.3	0.7	1.0	1.0	0.2	0.1	–	4.2	–	–	10.5	5.2	3.2
CIS	27–30 May 2024	7,491	26.6	28.6	11.0	7.3	1.4	1.3	0.9	0.9	0.9	0.2	0.0	–	2.6	–	–	9.1	3.4	2.0
SocioMétrica/El Español	17–19 May 2024	519	25.5	26.5	10.5	8.6	–	–	–	–	–	–	–	–	–	–	–	–	–	1.0
CIS	8–17 May 2024	6,434	27.0	27.8	12.2	7.2	1.7	1.7	1.1	0.6	1.0	0.3	0.1	–	3.2	–	–	7.0	3.5	0.8
40dB/Prisa	10–13 May 2024	2,000	23.7	25.1	13.1	5.8	1.0	1.9	0.7	0.9	0.7	0.2	0.0	–	2.9	–	–	11.6	5.9	1.4
Simple Lógica/elDiario.es	1–9 May 2024	1,131	22.2	19.5	8.4	6.5	–	–	–	–	–	–	–	–	1.1	–	–	15.9	18.1	2.7
CIS	3–8 May 2024	4,013	21.2	24.6	8.4	6.7	0.9	1.1	0.9	0.5	0.5	0.2	0.0	–	1.9	–	–	18.0	6.8	3.4
CIS	26 Apr 2024	1,809	15.9	24.2	8.4	4.9	0.8	2.0	0.7	0.3	0.5	0.1	–	–	1.6	–	–	25.0	8.5	8.3
CIS	9–13 Apr 2024	3,750	24.6	23.0	7.3	4.8	0.9	1.0	0.6	0.5	1.0	0.5	0.1	–	2.2	–	–	22.9	5.1	1.6
Simple Lógica/elDiario.es	1–9 Apr 2024	1,042	22.4	19.0	7.9	6.7	–	–	–	–	–	–	–	–	1.0	–	–	16.4	19.2	3.4
CIS	1–4 Apr 2024	4,032	24.6	22.9	8.2	5.9	0.8	0.9	0.8	0.6	0.6	0.4	0.0	–	2.0	–	–	19.1	6.2	1.7
40dB/Prisa	25–27 Mar 2024	2,000	23.6	23.5	10.7	7.1	2.2	2.6	0.8	0.9	0.9	0.2	0.1	–	3.4	–	–	12.5	6.3	0.1
Simple Lógica/elDiario.es	1–8 Mar 2024	1,046	22.4	17.4	7.4	7.8	–	–	–	–	–	–	–	–	1.3	–	–	16.9	20.3	5.0
CIS	1–5 Mar 2024	3,931	25.2	20.8	7.0	6.2	1.2	0.8	0.7	0.5	0.8	0.1	0.1	–	1.6	–	–	20.3	7.7	4.4
40dB/Prisa	1–3 Mar 2024	2,000	25.3	24.1	9.9	9.9	1.9	1.9	0.8	0.9	1.1	0.2	0.2	–	(Note: Within Sumar.)	–	–	11.5	6.3	1.2
GESOP/Prensa Ibérica	19–21 Feb 2024	1,002	28.0	21.3	6.0	7.4	1.4	1.3	–	–	–	–	–	–	1.3	–	–	11.2	16.7	6.7
SocioMétrica/El Español	5–9 Feb 2024	2,900	26.5	24.9	10.4	11.4	–	–	–	–	–	–	–	–		–	–	–	–	1.6
Simple Lógica/elDiario.es	1–9 Feb 2024	1,018	25.6	18.9	8.4	7.9	–	–	–	–	–	–	–	–	1.5	–	–	8.6	23.1	6.7
CIS	1–6 Feb 2024	3,926	24.1	22.1	6.1	7.6	1.5	0.7	0.4	0.6	0.6	0.1	0.1	–	2.0	–	–	19.1	7.9	2.0
CIS	11–23 Jan 2024	5,973	23.1	22.6	5.9	7.5	1.2	1.3	1.0	0.4	0.6	0.3	0.0	–	2.0	–	–	19.8	6.8	0.5
Simple Lógica/elDiario.es	2–9 Jan 2024	1,013	22.7	18.4	7.5	6.6	–	–	–	–	–	–	–	–	1.9	–	–	14.5	21.3	4.3
40dB/Prisa	5–8 Jan 2024	2,000	25.2	23.9	10.5	10.0	1.9	1.6	0.8	1.1	0.6	0.2	0.2	–		–	–	11.9	5.9	1.3
CIS	2–5 Jan 2024	4,016	23.5	24.7	6.1	7.3	1.1	1.0	0.7	0.6	0.7	0.1	0.0	–	2.2	–	–	17.6	7.4	1.2
SocioMétrica/El Español	25–31 Dec 2023	2,309	27.7	24.7	10.1	11.5	–	–	–	–	–	–	–	–		–	–	–	–	3.0
DYM/Henneo	13–15 Dec 2023	1,011	29.5	21.8	8.0	6.7	–	–	–	–	–	–	–	–	1.9	–	–	12.6	8.8	7.7
CIS	11–15 Dec 2023	6,195	24.7	24.9	7.5	7.2	1.6	0.9	0.7	0.7	0.5	0.2	0.0	–	1.3	–	–	20.8	4.4	0.2
Simple Lógica/elDiario.es	1–11 Dec 2023	1,003	24.0	20.2	7.1	8.7	–	–	–	–	–	–	–	–		–	–	16.6	16.2	3.8
CIS	1–7 Dec 2023	4,613	25.0	23.1	6.7	10.8	1.3	1.0	0.7	0.5	0.6	0.2	0.0	–		–	–	16.2	7.2	1.9
CIS	14 Nov–1 Dec 2023	10,306	24.2	21.7	6.7	10.3	1.2	1.4	0.9	0.6	0.6	0.1	0.1	–		–	–	21.1	5.3	2.5
40dB/Prisa	24–27 Nov 2023	2,000	25.4	23.4	10.9	10.9	1.6	2.0	0.7	0.9	0.9	0.4	0.1	–		–	–	9.4	6.3	2.0
GESOP/Prensa Ibérica	21–23 Nov 2023	1,002	26.1	20.3	7.2	10.0	1.3	1.5	–	–	–	–	–	–		–	–	14.4	15.3	5.8
DYM/Henneo	17–18 Nov 2023	1,004	31.7	21.4	8.3	8.0	–	–	–	–	–	–	–	–		–	–	11.1	6.4	10.3
Simple Lógica/elDiario.es	2–13 Nov 2023	1,021	26.3	18.7	6.7	10.1	–	–	–	–	–	–	–	–		–	–	13.9	15.8	7.6
CIS	31 Oct–6 Nov 2023	4,090	26.8	24.0	6.7	9.5	1.4	1.1	0.8	0.4	0.6	0.3	0.1	–		–	–	15.5	6.6	2.8
40dB/Prisa	27–30 Oct 2023	2,000	25.2	23.8	10.6	10.3	1.3	2.0	0.5	0.9	0.7	0.4	0.0	–		–	–	10.3	7.3	1.4
SocioMétrica/El Español	25–27 Oct 2023	2,600	28.9	25.4	9.2	11.2	–	–	–	–	–	–	–	–		–	–	–	–	3.5
Hamalgama Métrica/Vozpópuli	20–26 Oct 2023	1,000	24.0	22.2	7.8	7.3	–	–	–	–	–	–	–	–		–	–	–	–	1.8
DYM/Henneo	18–22 Oct 2023	1,035	31.3	26.5	8.4	6.4	–	–	–	–	–	–	–	–		–	–	10.3	4.7	4.8
CIS	18 Sep–16 Oct 2023	27,433	24.7	24.0	6.3	11.0	1.4	1.3	0.9	0.8	0.8	0.2	0.1	–		–	–	18.5	5.2	0.7
Simple Lógica/elDiario.es	2–10 Oct 2023	1,010	21.0	23.7	7.3	10.4	–	–	–	–	–	–	–	–		–	–	14.0	18.1	2.7
CIS	2–6 Oct 2023	4,031	26.4	24.1	6.4	11.5	1.4	1.4	0.8	0.7	0.7	0.1	0.1	–		–	–	15.7	5.0	2.3
40dB/Prisa	29 Sep–2 Oct 2023	2,000	24.6	25.0	10.8	10.4	1.6	2.9	0.8	0.7	0.7	0.3	0.2	–		–	–	9.5	6.6	0.4
SocioMétrica/El Español	21–23 Sep 2023	1,429	26.7	22.9	7.5	8.0	–	–	–	–	–	–	–	–		–	–	–	–	3.8
DYM/Henneo	14–17 Sep 2023	1,003	30.2	23.3	10.8	7.2	–	–	–	–	–	–	–	–		–	–	11.0	6.8	6.9
CIS	1–12 Sep 2023	10,104	22.8	26.6	6.7	12.2	1.3	1.5	1.0	0.6	0.7	0.2	0.1	–		–	–	17.9	4.3	3.8
Simple Lógica/elDiario.es	1–7 Sep 2023	1,032	20.2	24.4	7.3	10.7	–	–	–	–	–	–	–	–		–	–	15.0	16.5	4.2
40dB/Prisa	25–28 Aug 2023	2,000	23.1	26.7	10.3	12.4	1.3	2.1	0.8	0.6	0.6	0.6	0.0	–		–	–	9.4	6.2	3.6
Simple Lógica/elDiario.es	31 Jul–7 Aug 2023	1,098	20.3	26.4	7.6	13.7	–	–	–	–	–	–	–	–		–	–	10.4	12.3	6.1
2023 general election	23 Jul 2023	—N/a	23.0	22.1	8.6	8.6	1.3	1.1	0.9	0.8	0.4	0.3	0.1	0.0		–	–	—N/a	29.6	0.9

==== Victory preferences ====
The table below lists opinion polling on the victory preferences for each party in the event of a general election taking place.

Polling firm/Commissioner	Fieldwork date	Sample size	PP	PSOE	Vox	Podemos	SALF	FA	Other/ None	Question	Lead
Ipsos/La Vanguardia	13–20 Nov 2026	1,999	23.0	31.0	15.0	–	–	7.0	8.0	16.0	8.0
40dB/Prisa	2–4 Nov 2026	2,000	24.0	33.0	17.5	–	–	6.8	9.3	9.4	9.0
CIS	7–30 Oct 2026	45,074	23.4	36.6	14.1	1.7	1.8	7.3	10.0	5.1	13.2

==== Victory likelihood ====
The table below lists opinion polling on the perceived likelihood of victory for each party in the event of a general election taking place.

Polling firm/Commissioner	Fieldwork date	Sample size	PP	PSOE	Vox	Sumar	Podemos	FA	Other/ None	Question	Lead
Ipsos/La Vanguardia	13–20 Nov 2026	1,999	55.0	24.0	5.0	–	–	0.0	1.0	15.0	31.0
GAD3/Vocento	16–19 Nov 2026	1,501	66.0	29.0	2.0	–	–	–	3.0	–	37.0
GESOP	10–11 Nov 2026	966	50.9	23.6	6.3	–	–	–	1.2	18.0	27.3
GESOP	3–5 Nov 2026	946	51.2	22.6	6.9	–	–	–	1.2	18.1	28.6
40dB/Prisa	2–4 Nov 2026	2,000	48.6	25.4	8.4	–	–	1.9	1.2	14.6	23.2
GESOP	27–30 Oct 2026	989	44.9	25.9	6.2	–	–	–	1.1	21.9	19.0
CIS	7–30 Oct 2026	45,074	54.4	28.1	3.5	–	0.1	0.5	2.6	10.8	26.3
Winston/Artículo14	21–23 Oct 2026	1,200	38.0	20.0	–	–	–	–	42.0		18.0
GESOP/Prensa Ibérica	6–8 Oct 2026	1,000	56.6	19.1	4.2	0.6	0.2	–	0.5	18.8	37.5

==== Senate projections ====
Polling firm/Commissioner	Fieldwork date	Sample size	PP	PSOE	Sumar	Vox	ERC	Junts	EH Bildu	PNV	UPN	ASG	AHI	SDP
GAD3/Vocento	3–5 Nov 2026	1,502	122	(Note: Within SDP.)		7	3	0	3	2		1	1	70
SocioMétrica/El Español	1 Sep–1 Nov 2026	4,893	136			2	3	0	4	0		1	1	61
Hamalgama Métrica/Vozpópuli	22–28 Oct 2026	1,000	116			8	1	1	4	2		1	1	75
Opina 360	15 Oct 2026	?	83			1	4	0	5	0		1	1	114
Sigma Dos/El Mundo	1–14 Oct 2026	3,007	102/107			10/17	3/6	0/4	4/9	3/5	1/3	1	1	67/74
Sigma Dos/El Mundo	1–14 Oct 2026	3,007	114/119	54/60	0	11/23	3/6	0/4	4/9	3/5	1/3	1	1	–
2023 general election	23 Jul 2023	—N/a	120	72	0	0	3	1	4	4	1	1	1	–

== Preferred government ==
Opinion on government formation
Polling firm/Commissioner	Fieldwork date	Sample size	PSOE FA	PSOE	PP PSOE	PP	PP Vox	Vox	Other	None/ New election	Question	Notes
Target Point/El Debate	22 Nov 2026	?	24.9 (Note: 14.0% PSOE–FA coalition; 10.9% PSOE with the left and nationalists, just like now.)	6.7	4.6	13.9	23.8 (Note: 18.2% PP–Vox coalition; 5.6% PP with Vox's external support.)	–	9.3	–	16.9	(Note: Question asked was "Following the 29 November general election, what type of government would you prefer?")
40dB/Prisa	17–21 Nov 2026	2,000	22.0	16.6	6.9	15.9	24.6	–	–	5.6	8.4	(Note: Question asked was "And, overall, which government would you prefer to preside over Spain after this general election?")
40dB/Prisa	16–20 Nov 2026	2,000	22.2	16.7	7.1	15.7	24.1	–	–	5.7	8.5	
Ipsos/La Vanguardia	13–20 Nov 2026	1,999	35.0	–	16.0	–	35.0	–	2.0	2.0	10.0	(Note: Question asked was "If no party were to secure an outright majority, which of the following governing arrangements would you prefer?")
40dB/Prisa	15–19 Nov 2026	2,000	22.7	15.8	7.0	15.8	24.4	–	–	5.6	8.7	
40dB/Prisa	14–18 Nov 2026	2,000	22.8	15.9	7.2	15.1	24.5	–	–	5.7	8.9	
SW Demoscopia/La Séptima	26 Oct–18 Nov 2026	10,500	47.3	–	–	–	44.2	–	–	6.8	1.7	(Note: Question asked was "After the election, which government would you prefer: one consisting of PSOE and FA, or one consisting of PP and Vox?")
40dB/Prisa	13–17 Nov 2026	2,000	22.2	16.6	8.3	15.2	23.3	–	–	5.6	8.9	
SW Demoscopia/La Séptima	26 Oct–17 Nov 2026	10,000	47.3	–	–	–	44.1	–	–	6.8	1.8	
40dB/Prisa	12–16 Nov 2026	2,000	21.6	16.6	9.0	14.7	23.8	–	–	5.7	8.7	
SW Demoscopia/La Séptima	26 Oct–16 Nov 2026	9,500	47.2	–	–	–	44.0	–	–	6.9	1.8	
40dB/Prisa	10–15 Nov 2026	2,500	20.9	16.1	9.0	14.5	24.5	–	–	5.6	9.3	
40dB/Prisa	10–14 Nov 2026	2,000	20.7	15.6	8.8	14.7	24.6	–	–	5.6	9.6	
SW Demoscopia/La Séptima	26 Oct–14 Nov 2026	8,500	47.2	–	–	–	44.0	–	–	7.0	1.8	
40dB/Prisa	10–13 Nov 2026	1,500	21.3	14.4	8.8	14.2	25.3	–	–	6.0	10.1	
SW Demoscopia/La Séptima	26 Oct–13 Nov 2026	8,000	47.1	–	–	–	44.0	–	–	7.2	1.8	
40dB/Prisa	10–12 Nov 2026	1,000	21.6	13.1	8.1	14.3	26.2	–	–	5.8	10.9	
SW Demoscopia/La Séptima	26 Oct–12 Nov 2026	7,500	46.8	–	–	–	44.2	–	–	7.2	1.8	
GESOP	10–11 Nov 2026	966	39.5	–	7.3	18.3 (Note: 14.0% PP-only government; 4.3% PP with other support.)	19.6	–	–	15.3		
SW Demoscopia/La Séptima	26 Oct–11 Nov 2026	7,000	46.6	–	–	–	44.3	–	–	7.4	1.8	
SW Demoscopia/La Séptima	26 Oct–10 Nov 2026	6,500	46.8	–	–	–	44.2	–	–	7.3	1.8	
SW Demoscopia/La Séptima	26 Oct–9 Nov 2026	6,000	46.8	–	–	–	44.1	–	–	7.4	1.7	
SW Demoscopia/La Séptima	26 Oct–7 Nov 2026	5,000	46.8	–	–	–	44.0	–	–	7.4	1.7	
SW Demoscopia/La Séptima	26 Oct–6 Nov 2026	4,500	46.9	–	–	–	44.0	–	–	7.4	1.7	
SW Demoscopia/La Séptima	26 Oct–5 Nov 2026	4,000	46.7	–	–	–	44.3	–	–	7.4	1.6	
40dB/Prisa	2–4 Nov 2026	2,000	23.0	13.8	9.0	14.5	25.4	–	–	5.3	9.0	
SW Demoscopia/La Séptima	29 Oct–4 Nov 2026	3,500	46.7	–	–	–	44.2	–	–	7.4	1.7	
EM-Analytics/Electomanía	5–17 Oct 2026	6,873	–	–	–	35.1 (Note: 35.1% PP-only government; 8.2% PP with Vox's external support.)	29.9	6.4 (Note: 4.8% Vox-only government; 1.6% Vox with PP's external support.)	–	20.5		(Note: Question asked was "If there were a PP and Vox majority in Congress, which arrangement would you prefer?")
EM-Analytics/Electomanía	5–17 Oct 2026	6,873	33.6	6.8	1.8	17.0	29.3	–	9.5	–	2.0	(Note: Question asked was "Which form of government would you prefer after the next general election?")
Ipsos/La Vanguardia	23 Mar–8 Apr 2026	1,058	24.0	–	11.0	28.0 (Note: 16.0% PP with Vox's external support; 12.0% PP with PSOE's external support.)	16.0	–	–	9.0	12.0	(Note: Question asked was "If the PP were to win again without an absolute majority and an agreement were necessary to form a government, which alternative would you prefer?")
