= Leadership opinion polling for the 2023 Spanish general election =

In the run up to the 2023 Spanish general election, various organisations carried out opinion polling to gauge the opinions that voters hold towards political leaders. Results of such polls are displayed in this article. The date range for these opinion polls is from the previous general election, held on 10 November 2019, to the day the next election was held, on 23 July 2023.

== Preferred prime minister ==
The tables below list opinion polling on leader preferences to become prime minister.

=== All candidates ===
Color key:

Poll conducted after legal ban on opinion polls

Polling firm/Commissioner	Fieldwork date	Sample size										Other/ None/ Not care	Question	Lead
Polling firm/Commissioner	Fieldwork date	Sample size	Sánchez PSOE	Casado PP	Ayuso PP	Feijóo PP	Abascal Vox	Iglesias UP	Díaz UP/Sumar	Arrimadas CS	Errejón Más País	Other/ None/ Not care	Question	Lead
CIS	13–22 Jul 2023	27,060	36.0	–	–	28.7	7.3	–	13.5	–	–	7.1	7.5	7.3
GESOP/The Adelaide Review	19–21 Jul 2023	1,200	29.4	–	–	27.6	8.8	–	18.7	–	–	11.8	3.7	1.8
GESOP/The Adelaide Review	18–20 Jul 2023	1,200	28.4	–	–	27.0	7.7	–	19.1	–	–	13.2	4.5	1.4
GESOP/The Adelaide Review	17–19 Jul 2023	1,200	30.1	–	–	25.7	8.1	–	17.4	–	–	13.2	5.6	4.4
GESOP/The Adelaide Review	16–18 Jul 2023	1,200	29.9	–	–	24.6	8.4	–	18.1	–	–	13.6	5.4	5.3
GESOP/The Adelaide Review	15–17 Jul 2023	1,200	30.2	–	–	24.4	9.0	–	17.9	–	–	12.9	5.6	5.8
40dB/Prisa	12–16 Jul 2023	2,000	28.8	–	–	25.2	11.9	–	13.9	–	–	12.4	7.9	3.6
GESOP/Prensa Ibérica	13–15 Jul 2023	1,200	29.3	–	–	26.4	9.1	–	17.2	–	–	12.7	5.3	2.9
40dB/Prisa	11–15 Jul 2023	2,000	28.3	–	–	25.7	11.9	–	14.1	–	–	12.3	7.7	2.6
Sigma Dos/El Mundo	9–15 Jul 2023	5,622	26.4	–	–	28.1	6.8	–	10.3	–	–	28.4		1.7
40dB/Prisa	10–14 Jul 2023	2,000	28.4	–	–	24.8	11.8	–	14.4	–	–	12.8	7.9	3.6
40dB/Prisa	9–13 Jul 2023	2,000	29.6	–	–	23.9	12.6	–	13.3	–	–	12.7	7.8	5.7
CIS	10–12 Jul 2023	8,798	30.7	–	1.1	28.0	7.2	–	14.6	–	–	9.4	9.1	2.7
40dB/Prisa	8–12 Jul 2023	2,000	29.8	–	–	23.0	12.9	–	13.2	–	–	13.8	7.4	6.8
40dB/Prisa	7–11 Jul 2023	2,000	30.5	–	–	22.2	12.8	–	13.6	–	–	13.3	7.5	8.3
40dB/Prisa	6–10 Jul 2023	2,000	31.0	–	–	22.7	12.4	–	13.9	–	–	12.7	7.4	8.3
40dB/Prisa	4–9 Jul 2023	2,500	30.6	–	–	22.5	11.8	–	15.3	–	–	12.6	7.2	8.1
40dB/Prisa	4–8 Jul 2023	2,000	30.7	–	–	23.0	11.5	–	15.7	–	–	12.0	7.0	7.7
40dB/Prisa	4–7 Jul 2023	1,500	31.0	–	–	22.4	12.0	–	15.6	–	–	12.3	6.8	8.6
Ipsos/La Vanguardia	3–6 Jul 2023	2,001	28.0	–	–	33.0	8.0	–	14.0	–	–	8.0	10.0	5.0
40dB/Prisa	4–5 Jul 2023	1,000	30.9	–	–	21.1	12.2	–	16.1	–	–	12.6	7.1	9.8
CIS	30 Jun–5 Jul 2023	4,166	28.0	–	1.7	21.4	6.4	–	12.2	–	–	21.4	8.9	6.6
SocioMétrica/El Español	25 Jun–2 Jul 2023	800	30.3	–	–	31.6	15.7	–	22.4	–	–	–	–	1.3
CIS	8–27 Jun 2023	29,201	28.5	–	2.2	26.7	7.6	–	17.3	–	–	10.6	7.3	1.8
40dB/Prisa	23–26 Jun 2023	2,000	25.8	–	–	21.6	13.0	–	16.4	–	–	15.0	8.1	4.2
SocioMétrica/El Español	18–25 Jun 2023	800	27.4	–	–	30.4	18.0	–	24.3	–	–	–	–	3.0
40dB/Prisa	12–14 Jun 2023	2,000	25.3	–	–	23.6	13.2	–	15.9	–	–	14.2	7.9	1.7
Sondaxe/La Voz de Galicia	5–13 Jun 2023	1,013	20.0	–	–	22.1	8.6	–	13.9	–	–	35.4		2.1
GAD3/ABC	5–8 Jun 2023	2,007	25.9	–	–	31.0	10.6	–	12.5	–	–	20.0		5.1
CIS	31 May–7 Jun 2023	7,407	25.1	–	4.1	20.1	5.2	–	13.0	–	0.3	19.1	13.0	5.0
SocioMétrica/El Español	30 May–3 Jun 2023	1,140	28.6	–	–	29.0	19.4	–	23.0	–	–	–	–	0.4
GESOP/Prensa Ibérica	30 May–1 Jun 2023	1,003	25.4	–	–	25.0	8.0	–	17.6	–	–	16.7	7.4	0.4
CIS	3–8 May 2023	4,030	20.7	–	3.3	15.0	5.8	–	12.7	0.4	0.3	28.8	12.8	5.7
40dB/Prisa	21–25 Apr 2023	2,000	21.5	–	–	19.5	12.3	–	15.5	4.0	–	17.5	9.6	2.0
SocioMétrica/El Español	4–8 Apr 2023	900	25.3	–	–	28.5	18.8	–	22.6	4.8	–	–	–	3.2
CIS	31 Mar–5 Apr 2023	4,159	21.3	–	2.5	14.6	5.8	–	13.2	0.7	0.5	32.0	9.4	6.7
GAD3/ABC	22–24 Mar 2023	1,011	24.1	–	–	19.6	10.3	–	10.9	2.1	2.0	25.5	4.8	4.5
CIS	1–11 Mar 2023	3,788	22.0	–	2.0	15.0	4.4	–	9.6	0.7	–	33.1	13.2	7.0
SocioMétrica/El Español	28 Feb–3 Mar 2023	900	24.9	–	–	28.7	15.7	–	20.6	3.6	6.5	–	–	3.8
GESOP/Prensa Ibérica	27 Feb–1 Mar 2023	1,002	18.2	–	–	21.8	7.7	–	14.4	3.1	3.1	24.6	7.2	3.6
Sigma Dos/Antena 3	16–22 Feb 2023	?	18.4	–	–	23.9	–	–	15.8	–	–	–	–	5.5
CIS	1–11 Feb 2023	3,935	22.5	–	2.3	17.2	3.9	–	9.5	–	0.5	32.6	11.5	5.3
SocioMétrica/El Español	30 Jan–3 Feb 2023	900	25.4	–	–	25.2	–	–	–	–	–	–	–	0.2
Sigma Dos/Antena 3	25 Jan 2023	?	19.0	–	–	27.4	–	–	–	–	–	–	–	8.4
CIS	2–12 Jan 2023	3,961	22.3	–	2.3	16.4	4.3	–	9.6	0.7	–	33.3	11.2	5.9
SocioMétrica/El Español	28–31 Dec 2022	1,200	23.6	–	–	25.9	15.1	–	19.6	4.3	6.6	–	–	2.3
Sigma Dos/Antena 3	28 Dec 2022	?	18.5	–	–	24.2	–	–	–	–	–	–	–	5.7
CIS	1–14 Dec 2022	3,871	21.8	–	2.9	15.8	5.3	–	8.7	0.6	–	33.6	11.3	6.0
SocioMétrica/El Español	28 Nov–2 Dec 2022	1,200	25.7	–	–	27.0	–	–	–	–	–	–	–	1.3
GESOP/Prensa Ibérica	21–24 Nov 2022	1,001	21.6	–	–	21.1	7.2	–	15.5	2.4	4.4	20.8	7.1	0.5
Sigma Dos/Antena 3	17–23 Nov 2022	?	22.2	–	–	23.1	–	–	–	–	–	–	–	0.9
GAD3/ABC	1 Sep–23 Nov 2022	12,525	22.8	–	–	23.7	8.5	–	8.7	1.2	2.0	27.2	5.9	0.9
CIS	2–12 Nov 2022	3,821	22.9	–	2.7	15.9	4.8	–	8.6	0.8	0.6	32.8	10.8	7.0
SocioMétrica/El Español	31 Oct–2 Nov 2022	1,200	24.6	–	–	28.4	15.5	–	19.6	4.4	7.5	–	–	3.8
40dB/Prisa	27–30 Oct 2022	2,000	19.0	–	–	19.0	11.6	–	17.8	4.0	3.4	17.8	7.5	Tie
Sigma Dos/Antena 3	16 Oct 2022	?	18.7	–	–	26.5	11.8	–	16.3	2.3	2.1	14.9	7.3	7.8
CIS	1–10 Oct 2022	3,713	22.9	–	2.7	17.4	4.1	–	9.7	0.8	–	31.9	10.5	5.5
SocioMétrica/El Español	26–30 Sep 2022	1,200	21.2	–	–	30.7	16.3	–	20.4	4.9	6.5	–	–	9.5
CIS	1–10 Sep 2022	3,837	21.3	–	2.4	17.0	4.0	–	9.2	0.6	0.5	32.5	12.4	4.3
GAD3/ABC	6–9 Sep 2022	1,000	18.3	–	–	23.7	8.7	–	11.0	2.5	3.4	27.2	5.2	5.4
Sigma Dos/Antena 3	2–8 Sep 2022	?	18.1	–	–	26.8	9.7	–	15.2	2.2	2.9	14.8	10.2	8.7
SocioMétrica/El Español	29 Aug–3 Sep 2022	1,200	19.5	–	–	30.8	15.8	–	21.4	5.0	7.5	–	–	9.4
Sigma Dos/Antena 3	18–22 Jul 2022	?	17.3	–	–	26.5	11.0	–	16.2	1.8	2.5	14.1	10.6	9.2
SocioMétrica/El Español	14–16 Jul 2022	1,919	22.0	–	–	26.1	16.3	–	21.3	6.4	7.9	–	–	4.1
CIS	1–12 Jul 2022	3,988	22.1	–	2.2	20.8	3.6	–	9.1	0.6	–	29.5	12.1	1.3
GAD3/ABC	4–6 Jul 2022	1,003	17.6	–	–	34.3	6.2	–	8.8	1.8	2.0	24.3	5.0	16.7
Sigma Dos/Antena 3	26 Jun 2022	?	15.7	–	–	30.1	8.9	–	16.0	2.3	3.8	14.3	8.9	14.1
SocioMétrica/El Español	21–24 Jun 2022	1,200	21.9	–	–	27.7	16.1	–	20.3	5.4	8.6	–	–	5.8
GESOP/Prensa Ibérica	20–22 Jun 2022	1,001	16.7	–	–	25.7	5.5	–	15.1	2.5	5.0	22.1	7.5	9.0
CIS	1–9 Jun 2022	3,623	21.2	–	3.1	18.9	4.6	–	9.6	0.5	–	30.5	11.8	2.3
CIS	3–12 May 2022	3,865	19.5	–	3.5	16.6	4.7	–	10.5	–	–	32.7	12.5	2.9
Ágora Integral/Canarias Ahora	5–9 May 2022	1,000	21.8	–	–	24.9	12.5	–	13.0	–	–	–	–	3.1
SocioMétrica/El Español	4–7 May 2022	1,200	22.8	–	–	29.1	17.9	–	22.8	7.3	–	–	–	6.3
SocioMétrica/El Español	9 Apr 2022	?	15.7	–	–	17.0	12.2	–	14.4	5.4	–	35.3		1.3
CIS	1–9 Apr 2022	3,650	22.0	–	4.4	16.4	5.0	–	9.0	0.8	0.6	30.3	11.4	5.6
GESOP/Prensa Ibérica	4–6 Apr 2022	1,000	16.4	–	–	23.3	8.6	–	16.6	2.1	3.0	20.8	9.2	6.7
GAD3/ABC	4–6 Apr 2022	1,000	19.1	–	–	22.0	8.7	–	12.8	2.7	4.2	24.4	6.1	2.9
CIS	1–11 Mar 2022	3,922	26.0	0.6	7.0	11.7	4.5	–	10.0	1.1	0.6	27.1	11.5	14.3
SocioMétrica/El Español	21–25 Feb 2022	3,759	20.1	–	–	29.3	12.1	–	18.9	3.4	–	16.3		9.2
CIS	1–12 Feb 2022	3,860	20.1	9.5	2.1	–	7.2	–	19.0	5.8	4.1	24.0	8.1	1.1
CIS	3–14 Jan 2022	3,777	20.5	10.9	1.8	–	8.0	–	15.7	5.3	5.0	25.3	7.4	4.8
CIS	1–13 Dec 2021	3,733	21.9	11.1	2.6	–	7.3	–	17.1	6.2	5.2	23.4	5.1	4.8
CIS	2–11 Nov 2021	3,779	21.1	10.7	1.8	–	7.6	–	15.8	5.8	5.6	23.8	7.9	5.3
CIS	1–13 Oct 2021	3,660	19.8	12.6	–	–	7.2	–	14.8	6.4	6.5	25.4	7.2	5.0
CIS	1–13 Sep 2021	3,780	21.6	10.3	1.6	–	6.9	–	11.5	5.4	6.6	27.7	8.3	10.1
CIS	2–15 Jul 2021	3,798	22.0	10.5	2.4	–	5.8	–	9.5	4.2	5.2	29.4	11.2	11.5
CIS	2–15 Jun 2021	3,814	19.3	11.0	2.9	–	6.1	–	10.1	5.1	6.9	28.0	10.5	8.3
CIS	4–13 May 2021	3,814	21.7	12.5	2.4	–	5.7	4.3	1.7	4.4	6.8	30.6	9.9	9.2
CIS	5–14 Apr 2021	3,823	25.3	9.5	–	–	7.8	4.4	–	5.7	4.2	34.1	8.8	15.8
CIS	1–11 Mar 2021	3,820	27.1	7.8	–	–	7.8	3.8	–	8.4	3.6	32.7	8.8	18.7
CIS	3–11 Feb 2021	3,869	26.2	9.0	–	–	6.1	4.6	–	8.4	2.9	32.0	10.8	17.2
CIS	7–25 Jan 2021	3,862	25.9	10.3	–	–	5.3	4.2	–	7.7	2.4	32.7	11.4	15.6
CIS	1–9 Dec 2020	3,817	26.3	9.7	–	–	5.7	3.5	–	8.3	2.9	34.1	9.6	16.6
SW Demoscopia/infoLibre	26 Nov–5 Dec 2020	1,237	32.6	11.6	–	–	6.4	3.4	–	7.1	–	38.9		21.0
CIS	3–12 Nov 2020	3,853	26.5	8.4	–	–	5.7	4.0	–	6.9	2.6	36.1	9.6	18.1
CIS	1–7 Oct 2020	2,924	25.3	9.1	–	–	5.6	4.6	–	8.6	3.7	34.7	8.5	16.2
SW Demoscopia	Oct 2020	?	30.5	10.0	–	–	5.4	6.0	–	8.9	–	39.2		20.5
CIS	1–7 Sep 2020	2,904	27.9	9.1	–	–	5.4	4.6	–	8.9	2.0	32.2	9.9	18.8
SW Demoscopia	Sep 2020	?	30.9	9.8	–	–	4.2	4.2	–	10.5	–	40.5		20.4
SocioMétrica/El Español	20–26 Jul 2020	1,000	20.0	20.0	–	–	13.0	8.0	–	15.0	–	24.0		Tie
SocioMétrica/El Español	13–19 Jul 2020	1,000	20.0	21.0	–	–	13.0	8.0	–	15.0	–	23.0		1.0
CIS	9–19 Jul 2020	2,926	27.0	9.7	–	–	5.2	5.9	–	5.4	2.7	31.7	12.6	17.3
SocioMétrica/El Español	6–12 Jul 2020	1,000	21.0	23.0	–	–	13.0	7.0	–	15.0	–	21.0		2.0
IMOP/CIS	1–9 Jul 2020	3,032	32.2	9.5	–	–	4.4	5.3	–	6.7	0.4	30.8	10.8	22.7
SocioMétrica/El Español	29 Jun–5 Jul 2020	1,000	22.0	25.0	–	–	13.0	10.0	–	16.0	–	14.0		3.0
SocioMétrica/El Español	22–28 Jun 2020	1,000	23.0	26.0	–	–	12.0	9.0	–	15.0	–	15.0		3.0
SocioMétrica/El Español	15–21 Jun 2020	1,000	24.0	27.0	–	–	10.0	8.0	–	14.0	–	17.0		3.0
SocioMétrica/El Español	8–14 Jun 2020	1,000	25.0	27.0	–	–	10.0	9.0	–	15.0	–	14.0		2.0
IMOP/CIS	1–9 Jun 2020	4,258	32.1	9.1	–	–	4.1	5.1	–	7.9	–	31.0	10.8	23.0
SocioMétrica/El Español	1–7 Jun 2020	1,000	28.0	26.0	–	–	11.0	9.0	–	12.0	–	14.0		2.0
SocioMétrica/El Español	25–31 May 2020	1,000	30.0	25.0	–	–	12.0	8.0	–	13.0	–	12.0		5.0
SocioMétrica/El Español	18–24 May 2020	1,000	31.0	25.0	–	–	12.0	10.0	–	11.0	–	11.0		6.0
SocioMétrica/El Español	11–17 May 2020	1,000	31.0	25.0	–	–	12.0	10.0	–	10.0	–	12.0		6.0
Intercampo/CIS	4–13 May 2020	3,800	33.2	10.8	–	–	4.5	4.9	–	8.1	0.5	30.6	7.4	22.4
SocioMétrica/El Español	4–10 May 2020	1,000	31.0	27.0	–	–	13.0	10.0	–	9.0	–	10.0		4.0
SW Demoscopia	5–8 May 2020	1,104	33.6	11.7	–	–	4.6	5.6	–	7.9	–	36.6		21.9
SocioMétrica/El Español	27 Apr–3 May 2020	1,000	31.0	28.0	–	–	13.0	10.0	–	8.0	–	10.0		3.0
SocioMétrica/El Español	20–26 Apr 2020	1,000	32.0	27.0	–	–	11.0	9.0	–	9.0	–	12.0		5.0
SocioMétrica/El Español	13–19 Apr 2020	1,000	35.0	26.0	–	–	10.0	11.0	–	9.0	–	9.0		9.0
SocioMétrica/El Español	6–12 Apr 2020	1,000	33.0	26.0	–	–	11.0	10.0	–	12.0	–	8.0		7.0
Intercampo/CIS	30 Mar–7 Apr 2020	3,000	35.5	12.5	–	–	6.1	4.5	–	6.0	–	28.3	7.1	23.5
SocioMétrica/El Español	30 Mar–5 Apr 2020	1,000	30.0	26.0	–	–	11.0	13.0	–	10.0	–	10.0		4.0
SW Demoscopia	27–31 Mar 2020	1,102	34.5	12.7	–	–	3.0	3.5	–	5.2	–	41.0		21.8
SocioMétrica/El Español	23–29 Mar 2020	1,000	35.0	23.0	–	–	11.0	11.0	–	10.0	–	10.0		12.0
SocioMétrica/El Español	16–22 Mar 2020	1,000	31.0	19.0	–	–	14.0	13.0	–	14.0	–	9.0		12.0
SocioMétrica/El Español	9–15 Mar 2020	1,000	35.0	20.0	–	–	13.0	12.0	–	10.0	–	10.0		15.0
CIS	1–13 Mar 2020	3,912	31.1	12.4	–	–	5.4	7.5	–	7.7	2.4	25.7	7.8	18.7
CIS	1–11 Feb 2020	2,957	31.8	13.3	–	–	7.0	7.8	–	7.7	2.3	22.1	8.0	18.5
CIS	2–13 Jan 2020	2,929	29.7	13.0	–	–	6.1	10.1	–	7.2	3.1	23.1	7.8	16.7
InvyMark/laSexta	9–13 Dec 2019	?	41.2	24.5	–	–	6.6	19.8	–	–	–	–	7.9	16.7
InvyMark/laSexta	25–29 Nov 2019	?	38.4	28.5	–	–	8.5	17.4	–	–	–	–	7.2	9.9

=== Sánchez vs. Feijóo ===
Polling firm/Commissioner	Fieldwork date	Sample size			Other/ None/ Not care	Question	Lead
Polling firm/Commissioner	Fieldwork date	Sample size	Sánchez PSOE	Feijóo PP	Other/ None/ Not care	Question	Lead
DYM/Henneo	12–13 Jul 2023	1,019	39.0	36.4	–	24.6	2.6
DYM/Henneo	7–10 Jul 2023	1,021	42.0	37.1	–	20.9	4.9
DYM/Henneo	30 Jun–3 Jul 2023	1,018	42.9	34.5	–	22.6	8.4
SocioMétrica/El Español	25 Jun–2 Jul 2023	800	52.1	47.9	–	–	4.2
DYM/Henneo	16–26 Jun 2023	1,522	41.0	35.3	–	23.7	5.7
DYM/Henneo	16–19 Jun 2023	1,015	40.2	35.8	–	24.0	4.4
SocioMétrica/El Español	30 May–3 Jun 2023	1,140	54.0	46.0	–	–	8.0
DYM/Henneo	19–21 Apr 2023	1,008	40.9	30.8	–	28.3	10.1
DYM/Henneo	23–24 Mar 2023	1,008	37.4	33.9	–	28.7	3.5
SocioMétrica/El Español	28 Feb–3 Mar 2023	900	53.5	46.5	–	–	7.0
DYM/Henneo	15–19 Feb 2023	1,003	38.0	36.6	–	25.4	1.4
DYM/Henneo	18–20 Jan 2023	1,007	38.0	38.3	–	23.7	0.3
SocioMétrica/El Español	28–31 Dec 2022	1,200	54.1	45.9	–	–	8.2
DYM/Henneo	14–17 Dec 2022	1,014	37.1	37.0	–	25.9	0.1
DYM/Henneo	16–22 Nov 2022	?	40.4	34.8	–	24.8	5.6
SocioMétrica/El Español	31 Oct–2 Nov 2022	1,200	57.4	42.6	–	–	14.8
DYM/Henneo	19–23 Oct 2022	1,006	39.7	36.2	–	24.0	3.5
SocioMétrica/El Español	26–30 Sep 2022	1,200	51.2	48.8	–	–	2.4
DYM/Henneo	14–18 Sep 2022	1,007	36.8	35.5	–	27.7	1.3
DYM/Henneo	14–17 Jul 2022	1,000	33.1	38.9	–	28.0	5.8
DYM/Henneo	11–13 May 2022	?	36.3	37.5	–	26.3	1.2
Metroscopia	1–2 Mar 2022	900	37.0	40.0	23.0		3.0
SocioMétrica/El Español	21–25 Feb 2022	3,759	42.3	45.0	12.8		2.7

=== Sánchez vs. Casado ===
Polling firm/Commissioner	Fieldwork date	Sample size			Other/ None/ Not care	Question	Lead
Polling firm/Commissioner	Fieldwork date	Sample size	Sánchez PSOE	Casado PP	Other/ None/ Not care	Question	Lead
InvyMark/laSexta	11–15 Oct 2021	?	55.1	44.2	0.7	–	10.9

=== Sánchez vs. Ayuso ===
Polling firm/Commissioner	Fieldwork date	Sample size			Other/ None/ Not care	Question	Lead
Polling firm/Commissioner	Fieldwork date	Sample size	Sánchez PSOE	Ayuso PP	Other/ None/ Not care	Question	Lead
EM-Analytics/Electomanía	1–8 Oct 2021	2,119	45.7	46.7	–	7.6	1.0

=== Sánchez vs. Díaz ===
Polling firm/Commissioner	Fieldwork date	Sample size			Other/ None/ Not care	Question	Lead
Polling firm/Commissioner	Fieldwork date	Sample size	Sánchez PSOE	Díaz UP/Sumar	Other/ None/ Not care	Question	Lead
EM-Analytics/Electomanía	12–19 Nov 2021	1,564	45.8	54.2	–	–	8.4

=== Ayuso vs. Díaz ===
Polling firm/Commissioner	Fieldwork date	Sample size			Other/ None/ Not care	Question	Lead
Polling firm/Commissioner	Fieldwork date	Sample size	Ayuso PP	Díaz UP/Sumar	Other/ None/ Not care	Question	Lead
EM-Analytics/Electomanía	1–8 Oct 2021	2,119	47.9	48.0	–	4.1	0.1

=== Abascal vs. Iglesias ===
Polling firm/Commissioner	Fieldwork date	Sample size			Other/ None/ Not care	Question	Lead
Polling firm/Commissioner	Fieldwork date	Sample size	Abascal Vox	Iglesias UP	Other/ None/ Not care	Question	Lead
ElectoPanel/Electomanía	3–5 Feb 2020	1,490	42.6	57.4	–	–	14.8

== Predicted prime minister ==
The table below lists opinion polling on the perceived likelihood for each leader to become prime minister.

=== All candidates ===
Color key:

Poll conducted after legal ban on opinion polls

Polling firm/Commissioner	Fieldwork date	Sample size								Other/ None/ Not care	Question	Lead
Polling firm/Commissioner	Fieldwork date	Sample size	Sánchez PSOE	Casado PP	Feijóo PP	Abascal Vox	Díaz UP/Sumar	Arrimadas CS	Errejón Más País	Other/ None/ Not care	Question	Lead
CIS	13–22 Jul 2023	27,060	31.7	–	51.6	1.5	1.3	–	–	0.5	13.4	19.9
Sigma Dos/El Mundo	9–15 Jul 2023	5,622	20.2	–	49.6	–	–	–	–	26.6		29.4
Sigma Dos/Antena 3	23 Jun–3 Jul 2023	2,880	28.8	–	48.2	3.4	6.7	–	–	–	12.9	19.4
Sigma Dos/Antena 3	5–13 Jun 2023	1,515	22.9	–	49.9	2.9	4.6	–	–	–	19.5	27.0
SocioMétrica/El Español	28–31 Dec 2022	1,200	34.2	–	48.7	5.7	6.9	2.6	1.9	–	–	14.5
SocioMétrica/El Español	28 Nov–2 Dec 2022	1,200	32.1	–	51.6	–	–	–	–	–	–	19.5
SocioMétrica/El Español	31 Oct–2 Nov 2022	1,200	28.6	–	54.2	5.5	7.6	2.2	1.9	–	–	25.6
SocioMétrica/El Español	26–30 Sep 2022	1,200	24.6	–	59.7	4.3	7.3	1.9	2.2	–	–	35.1
SocioMétrica/El Español	29 Aug–3 Sep 2022	1,200	31.8	–	51.2	5.6	7.0	1.9	2.5	–	–	19.4
SocioMétrica/El Español	14–16 Jul 2022	1,919	39.2	–	40.7	8.3	7.4	2.0	2.3	–	–	1.5
Sigma Dos/El Mundo	5–7 Apr 2022	2,400	30.1	–	35.5	7.9	5.5	0.9	0.8	–	19.4	5.4
Sigma Dos/El Mundo	10–11 Nov 2021	1,688	30.8	28.5	–	6.6	7.3	1.4	0.5	–	24.9	2.3
DYM/Henneo	20–24 Oct 2021	1,000	30.4	29.0	–	5.0	7.3	0.5	1.2	–	26.7	1.4

=== Sánchez vs. Feijóo ===
Polling firm/Commissioner	Fieldwork date	Sample size			Other/ None/ Not care	Question	Lead
Polling firm/Commissioner	Fieldwork date	Sample size	Sánchez PSOE	Feijóo PP	Other/ None/ Not care	Question	Lead
GAD3/NIUS	27–28 Jun 2023	1,005	26.2	50.3	7.4	16.0	24.1
GAD3/NIUS	8–9 May 2023	1,011	33.2	40.5	10.2	16.0	7.3
SocioMétrica/El Español	28 Feb–3 Mar 2023	900	47.9	52.1	–	–	4.2
GAD3/NIUS	20–22 Feb 2023	1,001	28.8	41.2	7.2	22.7	12.4
Data10/Okdiario	24–26 Jan 2023	1,500	36.8	40.3	22.9		3.5
Data10/Okdiario	29 Nov–1 Dec 2022	1,000	34.7	41.1	4.4	19.8	6.4

=== Sánchez vs. Casado ===
Polling firm/Commissioner	Fieldwork date	Sample size			Other/ None/ Not care	Question	Lead
Polling firm/Commissioner	Fieldwork date	Sample size	Sánchez PSOE	Casado PP	Other/ None/ Not care	Question	Lead
InvyMark/laSexta	11–15 Oct 2021	?	52.3	46.3	1.4	–	6.0

== Leader ratings ==
The table below lists opinion polling on leader ratings, on a 0–10 scale: 0 would stand for a "terrible" rating, whereas 10 would stand for "excellent".

Polling firm/Commissioner	Fieldwork date	Sample size										
Polling firm/Commissioner	Fieldwork date	Sample size	Sánchez PSOE	Casado PP	Ayuso PP	Feijóo PP	Abascal Vox	Iglesias UP	Díaz UP/Sumar	Belarra Podemos	Arrimadas CS	Errejón Más País
NC Report/La Razón	15–16 Jul 2023	1,000	4.2	–	–	4.5	3.4	–	4.0	–	–	–
InvyMark/laSexta	10–14 Jul 2023	?	4.69	–	–	4.83	2.75	–	3.98	–	–	–
DYM/Henneo	12–13 Jul 2023	1,019	3.9	–	–	4.4	2.5	–	4.1	–	–	–
DYM/Henneo	7–10 Jul 2023	1,021	4.0	–	–	4.1	2.5	–	4.0	–	–	–
NC Report/La Razón	3–7 Jul 2023	1,000	4.2	–	–	4.5	3.3	–	4.1	–	–	–
Sondaxe/La Voz de Galicia	3–7 Jul 2023	1,000	4.67	–	–	4.26	2.85	–	4.37	–	–	–
InvyMark/laSexta	3–7 Jul 2023	?	4.40	–	–	4.55	3.37	–	3.90	–	–	–
CIS	30 Jun–5 Jul 2023	4,166	4.79	–	–	4.46	2.82	–	4.84	–	–	–
Opinòmetre/Ara	27 Jun–4 Jul 2023	1,521	4.5	–	–	3.9	2.4	–	4.8	–	–	–
DYM/Henneo	30 Jun–3 Jul 2023	1,018	4.0	–	–	4.1	2.5	–	4.0	–	–	–
Sigma Dos/Antena 3	23 Jun–3 Jul 2023	2,880	4.1	–	–	4.1	–	–	4.3	–	–	–
Sigma Dos/El Mundo	26–30 Jun 2023	2,109	4.0	–	–	4.1	3.0	–	4.1	–	–	–
GAD3/NIUS	27–28 Jun 2023	1,005	4.2	–	–	4.4	–	–	4.5	–	–	–
CIS	8–27 Jun 2023	29,201	4.68	–	–	4.30	2.96	–	4.70	3.12	–	–
DYM/Henneo	16–26 Jun 2023	1,522	3.9	–	–	4.1	2.7	–	4.0	–	–	–
Sigma Dos/El Mundo	16–23 Jun 2023	2,188	3.8	–	–	4.3	3.1	–	4.2	–	–	–
DYM/Henneo	16–19 Jun 2023	1,015	4.0	–	–	4.2	2.7	–	4.0	–	–	–
NC Report/La Razón	12–17 Jun 2023	1,000	4.2	–	–	4.5	3.3	–	4.1	–	–	–
Sigma Dos/Antena 3	5–13 Jun 2023	1,515	4.1	–	–	4.6	3.1	–	4.5	–	–	–
GAD3/ABC	5–8 Jun 2023	2,007	4.1	–	–	4.6	3.2	–	4.3	–	–	–
Sigma Dos/El Mundo	5–8 Jun 2023	1,711	4.1	–	–	4.7	3.0	–	4.5	2.7	–	–
CIS	31 May–7 Jun 2023	7,407	4.59	–	–	4.37	3.00	–	4.89	3.17	–	4.18
NC Report/La Razón	30 May–3 Jun 2023	1,000	4.1	–	–	4.5	3.1	–	4.2	–	–	–
SocioMétrica/El Español	30 May–3 Jun 2023	1,140	4.0	–	–	3.7	3.2	–	4.4	–	–	–
GESOP/Prensa Ibérica	30 May–1 Jun 2023	1,003	4.30	–	–	4.63	2.94	–	4.64	–	–	–
Sigma Dos/El Mundo	29 May–1 Jun 2023	2,401	3.8	–	–	4.5	3.0	–	4.2	2.4	–	–
GAD3/NIUS	8–9 May 2023	1,011	4.2	–	–	4.2	2.8	–	4.4	–	3.4	3.5
CIS	3–8 May 2023	4,030	4.39	–	–	4.11	2.86	–	4.79	–	3.47	4.12
SocioMétrica/El Español	2–5 May 2023	900	3.6	–	–	3.4	3.1	–	4.1	–	–	–
InvyMark/laSexta	24–28 Apr 2023	?	4.60	–	–	4.15	2.60	–	3.65	–	–	–
Sigma Dos/El Mundo	24–27 Apr 2023	2,059	3.8	–	–	3.7	2.8	–	4.0	2.6	–	–
DYM/Henneo	19–21 Apr 2023	1,008	3.9	–	4.0	3.8	2.7	–	4.6	–	3.3	3.6
SocioMétrica/El Español	4–8 Apr 2023	900	3.6	–	–	3.5	3.5	–	4.3	–	2.5	–
Sigma Dos/El Mundo	3–5 Apr 2023	1,755	3.9	–	–	3.8	2.5	–	4.1	2.8	–	–
CIS	31 Mar–5 Apr 2023	4,159	4.43	–	–	4.03	2.73	–	4.87	–	3.39	4.07
DYM/Henneo	23–24 Mar 2023	1,008	3.7	–	3.7	3.7	2.5	–	4.1	–	3.1	3.2
GAD3/ABC	22–24 Mar 2023	1,011	4.1	–	–	4.0	2.5	–	4.2	–	3.1	3.1
InvyMark/laSexta	20–24 Mar 2023	?	4.97	–	–	3.66	2.54	–	3.65	–	–	–
CIS	1–11 Mar 2023	3,788	4.41	–	–	4.28	2.68	–	4.89	–	3.39	4.10
InvyMark/laSexta	6–10 Mar 2023	?	4.77	–	–	4.20	2.54	–	3.65	–	–	–
SocioMétrica/El Español	28 Feb–3 Mar 2023	900	3.6	–	–	3.6	2.7	–	4.1	–	2.5	3.8
Sigma Dos/El Mundo	24 Feb–2 Mar 2023	1,772	3.8	–	–	3.8	2.9	–	4.1	–	3.0	3.4
GESOP/Prensa Ibérica	27 Feb–1 Mar 2023	1,002	3.85	–	–	4.33	2.60	–	4.63	–	3.44	3.75
NC Report/La Razón	20–24 Feb 2023	1,000	4.1	–	–	4.4	3.4	–	4.0	–	–	–
InvyMark/laSexta	20–24 Feb 2023	?	4.79	–	–	4.07	2.10	–	3.59	–	–	–
GAD3/NIUS	20–22 Feb 2023	1,001	3.9	–	–	4.1	2.6	–	4.0	–	3.0	3.2
Sigma Dos/Antena 3	16–22 Feb 2023	?	3.5	–	–	3.6	2.7	–	3.8	–	2.6	3.2
DYM/Henneo	15–19 Feb 2023	1,003	3.8	–	3.9	4.1	2.6	–	4.1	–	3.2	3.4
CIS	1–11 Feb 2023	3,935	4.34	–	–	4.34	2.72	–	4.91	–	3.41	4.02
Sigma Dos/El Mundo	27 Jan–2 Feb 2023	1,702	3.7	–	–	3.9	2.7	–	4.1	–	2.9	3.4
InvyMark/laSexta	23–27 Jan 2023	?	4.75	–	–	3.86	2.10	–	3.59	–	–	–
Sigma Dos/Antena 3	25 Jan 2023	?	3.6	–	–	3.6	2.7	–	3.9	–	2.6	3.2
DYM/Henneo	18–20 Jan 2023	1,007	3.6	–	4.1	4.2	2.7	–	4.1	2.4	3.3	3.3
CIS	2–12 Jan 2023	3,961	4.38	–	–	4.27	2.76	–	4.87	–	3.32	4.00
SocioMétrica/El Español	28–31 Dec 2022	1,200	3.6	–	–	3.7	2.7	–	4.1	–	2.5	3.8
Sigma Dos/El Mundo	26–30 Dec 2022	1,911	3.7	–	–	3.7	3.0	–	4.0	–	2.8	3.4
Sigma Dos/Antena 3	28 Dec 2022	?	3.5	–	–	3.5	2.7	–	3.6	–	2.5	3.2
InvyMark/laSexta	19–23 Dec 2022	?	4.57	–	–	3.88	2.34	–	3.69	–	–	–
DYM/Henneo	14–17 Dec 2022	1,014	3.5	–	4.0	4.1	2.5	–	3.9	2.6	3.1	3.2
CIS	1–14 Dec 2022	3,871	4.28	–	–	4.39	2.90	–	4.82	–	3.48	4.14
InvyMark/laSexta	28 Nov–2 Dec 2022	?	4.50	–	–	4.28	2.29	–	3.34	–	–	–
SocioMétrica/El Español	28 Nov–2 Dec 2022	1,200	3.5	–	–	3.8	2.8	–	3.9	–	–	3.7
Sigma Dos/El Mundo	25–30 Nov 2022	1,495	3.8	–	–	3.8	2.9	–	4.1	–	2.8	3.4
GESOP/Prensa Ibérica	21–24 Nov 2022	1,001	4.30	–	–	4.61	2.72	–	4.93	–	3.64	4.10
Sigma Dos/Antena 3	17–23 Nov 2022	?	3.7	–	–	3.6	2.7	–	3.9	–	2.5	3.2
DYM/Henneo	16–22 Nov 2022	1,003	3.6	–	3.9	4.0	2.6	–	3.9	2.6	3.1	3.2
CIS	2–12 Nov 2022	3,821	4.42	–	–	4.25	2.80	–	4.90	–	3.45	4.13
SocioMétrica/El Español	31 Oct–2 Nov 2022	1,200	3.5	–	–	3.9	2.7	–	4.0	–	2.5	3.8
Sigma Dos/El Mundo	24–31 Oct 2022	2,503	3.9	–	–	4.1	2.9	–	4.1	–	3.0	3.5
DYM/Henneo	19–23 Oct 2022	1,006	3.7	–	4.0	4.1	2.6	–	4.1	2.6	3.1	3.5
Sigma Dos/Antena 3	16 Oct 2022	?	3.7	–	–	4.0	2.8	–	3.9	2.8	3.2	
CIS	1–10 Oct 2022	3,713	4.47	–	–	4.42	2.65	–	4.71	–	3.26	3.89
InvyMark/laSexta	3–7 Oct 2022	?	4.44	–	–	4.46	2.35	–	2.89	–	–	–
SocioMétrica/El Español	26–30 Sep 2022	1,200	3.2	–	–	4.4	3.0	–	4.2	–	2.9	3.9
Sigma Dos/El Mundo	26–29 Sep 2022	1,541	3.8	–	–	4.2	2.9	–	4.1	–	2.9	3.5
InvyMark/laSexta	19–23 Sep 2022	?	4.72	–	–	4.03	2.33	–	3.48	–	–	–
DYM/Henneo	14–18 Sep 2022	1,007	3.8	–	3.9	4.0	2.6	–	4.0	2.7	3.1	3.5
CIS	1–10 Sep 2022	3,837	4.37	–	–	4.48	2.74	–	4.73	–	3.25	3.87
Sigma Dos/Antena 3	2–8 Sep 2022	?	3.7	–	–	3.9	2.7	–	3.9	2.6	3.3	
SocioMétrica/El Español	29 Aug–3 Sep 2022	1,200	3.3	–	–	4.5	3.0	–	4.3	–	2.8	4.0
Sigma Dos/El Mundo	29 Aug–2 Sep 2022	?	3.7	–	–	4.2	3.1	–	4.0	–	2.6	3.4
Sigma Dos/Antena 3	18–22 Jul 2022	?	3.6	–	–	4.1	2.8	–	3.8	2.6	3.2	–
DYM/Henneo	14–17 Jul 2022	1,000	3.6	–	4.3	4.6	2.7	–	4.0	2.7	3.3	3.4
SocioMétrica/El Español	14–16 Jul 2022	1,919	3.3	–	–	4.5	2.9	–	4.3	–	2.8	3.9
GAD3/NIUS	12–14 Jul 2022	1,000	3.9	–	–	4.5	2.8	–	4.5	–	3.0	3.7
CIS	1–12 Jul 2022	3,988	4.33	–	–	4.89	2.78	–	4.81	–	3.44	4.02
GAD3/ABC	4–6 Jul 2022	1,003	3.5	–	–	5.3	2.8	–	3.9	–	3.1	3.1
SW Demoscopia	29 Jun–1 Jul 2022	1,002	4.57	–	–	4.68	3.56	–	4.76	–	3.85	–
Sigma Dos/El Mundo	27–29 Jun 2022	1,212	3.5	–	–	4.4	2.9	–	3.8	–	2.9	3.4
Sigma Dos/Antena 3	26 Jun 2022	?	3.4	–	–	4.3	2.7	–	3.7	2.7	3.2	–
SocioMétrica/El Español	21–24 Jun 2022	1,200	3.2	–	–	4.7	2.8	–	4.1	–	2.8	4.4
InvyMark/laSexta	20–24 Jun 2022	?	4.26	–	–	4.83	2.44	–	3.15	–	–	–
GESOP/Prensa Ibérica	20–22 Jun 2022	1,001	3.88	–	–	5.11	2.46	–	4.72	–	3.66	4.03
CIS	1–9 Jun 2022	3,623	4.31	–	–	4.75	2.83	–	4.91	–	3.56	3.95
InvyMark/laSexta	30 May–3 Jun 2022	?	4.63	–	–	4.24	2.62	–	3.98	–	3.04	–
DYM/Henneo	11–13 May 2022	?	3.7	–	4.3	4.7	2.7	–	4.2	2.5	3.3	3.4
CIS	3–12 May 2022	3,865	4.28	–	–	4.86	2.91	–	5.05	–	3.58	4.00
SocioMétrica/El Español	4–7 May 2022	1,200	3.4	–	–	4.4	3.1	–	4.3	–	2.9	–
DYM/Henneo	20–22 Apr 2022	1,012	3.8	–	4.3	4.6	2.8	–	4.3	2.7	3.3	3.6
InvyMark/laSexta	18–22 Apr 2022	?	4.96	–	–	4.20	2.54	–	3.98	–	2.81	–
EM-Analytics/Electomanía	15 Mar–13 Apr 2022	4,650	4.1	–	–	4.3	3.6	–	4.8	–	2.8	4.0
SocioMétrica/El Español	9 Apr 2022	?	3.5	–	–	3.9	3.0	–	4.2	–	2.7	–
CIS	1–9 Apr 2022	3,650	4.65	–	–	5.20	3.16	–	5.36	–	4.00	4.54
Sigma Dos/El Mundo	5–7 Apr 2022	2,400	4.0	–	–	4.5	3.1	–	4.2	–	3.2	3.6
GESOP/Prensa Ibérica	4–6 Apr 2022	1,000	4.16	–	–	5.23	2.84	–	4.92	–	3.82	4.13
Sigma Dos/Antena 3	29 Mar 2022	?	3.7	–	–	3.9	2.5	–	3.9	–	2.7	3.3
DYM/Henneo	16–19 Mar 2022	1,019	3.9	–	4.5	4.6	3.0	–	4.2	2.5	3.4	3.5
InvyMark/laSexta	7–11 Mar 2022	?	4.85	–	–	4.02	2.55	–	3.84	–	2.68	–
CIS	1–11 Mar 2022	3,922	4.79	3.48	–	–	2.97	–	5.23	–	3.85	4.26
Sigma Dos/Antena 3	2 Mar 2022	?	3.7	2.4	–	–	2.8	–	3.9	–	2.7	3.2
Target Point/El Debate	23–25 Feb 2022	1,005	3.98	2.41	4.20	5.13	2.71	–	4.85	–	–	3.71
Ágora Integral/Canarias Ahora	23–25 Feb 2022	1,000	4.6	–	4.7	4.8	3.0	–	3.4	–	–	3.1
InvyMark/laSexta	21–25 Feb 2022	?	4.75	3.67	–	–	2.36	–	3.63	–	2.83	–
DYM/Henneo	16–20 Feb 2022	1,013	3.6	2.9	–	–	2.8	–	4.0	–	3.1	3.3
GAD3/NIUS	14–17 Feb 2022	1,000	4.3	3.4	4.2	–	2.6	–	4.6	–	3.2	3.3
GESOP/El Periódico	14–16 Feb 2022	1,002	4.16	3.33	–	–	2.59	–	4.92	–	3.41	3.98
CIS	1–12 Feb 2022	3,860	4.49	3.23	–	–	2.71	–	4.87	–	3.66	4.01
EM-Analytics/Electomanía	15 Dec–31 Jan 2022	7,049	3.6	2.4	–	–	2.7	–	4.2	–	2.4	3.5
DYM/Henneo	19–23 Jan 2022	1,008	3.5	3.0	–	–	2.6	–	3.9	–	3.2	3.3
CIS	3–14 Jan 2022	3,777	4.34	3.37	–	–	2.88	–	4.82	–	3.59	4.05
SocioMétrica/El Español	20–30 Dec 2021	3,000	3.8	2.8	–	–	2.9	–	3.8	–	3.1	–
Sigma Dos/Antena 3	26 Dec 2021	?	3.6	3.1	–	–	2.6	–	3.6	–	2.8	2.9
Sigma Dos/El Mundo	20–24 Dec 2021	2,619	3.7	3.2	–	–	2.9	–	3.9	–	3.2	3.4
DYM/Henneo	15–19 Dec 2021	1,012	3.6	3.1	–	–	2.6	–	4.1	–	3.4	3.5
GAD3/ABC	13–16 Dec 2021	1,003	4.0	3.4	–	–	2.8	–	4.1	–	3.1	3.2
CIS	1–13 Dec 2021	3,733	4.55	3.40	–	–	2.77	–	4.84	–	3.65	4.15
EM-Analytics/Electomanía	12 Nov–3 Dec 2021	7,049	3.3	2.7	–	–	2.4	–	4.3	–	2.8	3.6
Sigma Dos/Antena 3	22 Nov 2021	?	3.6	3.0	–	–	2.6	–	3.6	–	2.8	3.2
DYM/Henneo	17–21 Nov 2021	1,021	3.5	3.2	–	–	2.8	–	4.1	–	3.3	3.3
InvyMark/laSexta	15–19 Nov 2021	?	4.56	3.89	–	–	2.29	–	3.38	–	2.73	–
CIS	2–11 Nov 2021	3,779	4.45	3.41	–	–	2.79	–	4.76	–	3.61	4.13
Sigma Dos/El Mundo	10–11 Nov 2021	1,688	3.7	3.3	–	–	3.0	–	3.8	–	3.1	3.3
GAD3/NIUS	8–11 Nov 2021	1,001	4.3	3.7	4.5	–	2.7	–	4.5	–	3.4	3.5
EM-Analytics/Electomanía	29 Oct–4 Nov 2021	1,479	3.7	2.9	–	–	2.5	–	3.7	–	2.7	3.1
SW Demoscopia	20–30 Oct 2021	1,203	4.24	3.92	–	–	3.46	–	4.41	–	4.01	–
DYM/Henneo	20–24 Oct 2021	1,000	3.6	3.4	–	–	2.9	–	4.2	–	3.3	3.3
Sigma Dos/El Mundo	19–21 Oct 2021	1,928	3.8	3.5	–	–	2.9	–	3.9	–	3.2	3.4
CIS	1–13 Oct 2021	3,660	4.4	3.5	–	–	2.8	–	4.8	–	3.7	4.2
Sigma Dos/Antena 3	11 Oct 2021	?	3.6	3.2	–	–	2.7	–	3.4	–	2.8	3.1
EM-Analytics/Electomanía	24 Sep–1 Oct 2021	1,193	3.9	3.4	–	–	3.2	–	4.3	–	3.3	4.1
DYM/Henneo	16–19 Sep 2021	1,000	3.9	3.5	–	–	3.1	–	4.0	–	3.6	3.7
EM-Analytics/Electomanía	10–17 Sep 2021	1,233	3.9	3.4	–	–	3.3	–	4.3	–	3.4	4.1
CIS	1–13 Sep 2021	3,780	4.5	3.4	–	–	2.7	–	4.6	–	3.6	4.2
Sigma Dos/El Mundo	30 Aug–2 Sep 2021	1,050	3.8	3.3	–	–	2.8	–	–	2.7	3.0	3.3
Sigma Dos/Antena 3	30 Aug 2021	?	3.4	3.1	–	–	2.7	–	–	2.5	2.7	3.1
NC Report/La Razón	24–27 Aug 2021	1,000	3.9	3.7	–	–	2.9	–	3.4	–	3.4	3.2
EM-Analytics/Electomanía	16–23 Jul 2021	1,601	4.2	3.6	–	–	3.5	–	4.1	–	3.7	4.3
Sigma Dos/Antena 3	19 Jul 2021	?	3.4	3.1	–	–	2.7	–	–	2.4	2.7	3.1
DYM/Henneo	15–19 Jul 2021	1,019	3.2	3.3	–	–	2.6	–	3.4	–	3.1	3.1
InvyMark/laSexta	12–16 Jul 2021	?	4.40	3.78	–	–	2.43	–	–	2.75	2.40	–
GESOP/El Periódico	14–15 Jul 2021	802	4.12	3.52	–	–	2.29	–	4.82	–	3.38	4.32
CIS	2–15 Jul 2021	3,798	4.6	3.5	–	–	2.7	–	4.6	–	3.5	4.1
EM-Analytics/Electomanía	8–10 Jul 2021	1,933	4.3	3.5	–	–	3.4	–	4.1	–	3.6	4.6
EM-Analytics/Electomanía	2–6 Jul 2021	2,111	4.1	3.5	–	–	3.4	–	4.2	–	3.6	4.5
Sigma Dos/El Mundo	28 Jun–1 Jul 2021	1,020	3.8	3.6	–	–	2.7	–	–	3.0	3.3	4.1
EM-Analytics/Electomanía	24–28 Jun 2021	2,017	4.2	3.6	–	–	3.5	–	4.2	–	3.7	4.7
SocioMétrica/El Español	27 Jun 2021	?	3.1	2.6	–	–	2.7	–	2.9	–	2.4	–
Sigma Dos/Antena 3	21 Jun 2021	?	3.4	3.2	–	–	2.4	–	–	2.4	2.8	3.2
DYM/Henneo	17–21 Jun 2021	1,002	3.5	3.2	–	–	2.7	–	3.8	–	3.3	–
CIS	2–15 Jun 2021	3,814	4.5	3.5	–	–	2.7	–	4.6	–	3.4	4.2
Sigma Dos/El Mundo	31 May–1 Jun 2021	1,020	3.46	3.57	–	–	2.94	–	3.87	–	3.18	–
SocioMétrica/El Español	26–29 May 2021	1,100	3.1	2.5	–	–	2.7	2.4	–	–	2.2	–
DYM/Henneo	21–24 May 2021	1,008	3.4	3.6	–	–	2.8	–	3.6	–	3.3	–
InvyMark/laSexta	17–21 May 2021	?	4.21	4.08	–	–	2.48	–	–	–	2.34	–
GAD3/ABC	12–18 May 2021	1,202	3.8	4.1	–	–	3.1	–	4.1	–	3.2	3.6
Sigma Dos/Antena 3	17 May 2021	?	3.4	3.3	–	–	2.4	2.2	–	–	2.7	–
CIS	4–13 May 2021	3,814	4.5	3.7	–	–	2.6	3.4	–	–	3.4	–
InvyMark/laSexta	5–7 May 2021	?	4.24	4.48	–	–	2.61	–	–	–	2.19	–
Sigma Dos/El Mundo	5–6 May 2021	1,000	3.51	3.39	–	–	2.70	–	3.39	–	2.80	–
InvyMark/laSexta	12–16 Apr 2021	?	4.71	3.80	–	–	2.54	2.83	–	–	2.84	–
CIS	5–14 Apr 2021	3,823	4.5	3.5	–	–	2.7	3.3	–	–	3.3	–
CIS	1–11 Mar 2021	3,820	4.4	3.3	–	–	2.6	3.0	–	–	3.4	–
Sigma Dos/El Mundo	1–3 Mar 2021	1,096	3.7	3.0	–	–	2.8	2.4	–	–	3.3	–
DYM/Henneo	19–23 Feb 2021	1,002	3.5	2.9	–	–	2.5	2.2	–	–	3.3	–
CIS	3–11 Feb 2021	3,869	4.3	3.2	–	–	2.5	3.1	–	–	3.4	–
CIS	7–25 Jan 2021	3,862	4.3	3.2	–	–	2.3	3.1	–	–	3.4	–
InvyMark/laSexta	18–22 Jan 2021	?	4.81	3.73	–	–	2.08	3.35	–	–	3.32	–
SocioMétrica/El Español	28 Dec–5 Jan 2021	1,206	3.4	2.7	–	–	2.7	2.5	–	–	3.5	–
Sigma Dos/El Mundo	22–29 Dec 2020	1,144	4.1	3.8	–	–	2.9	3.2	–	–	4.1	–
InvyMark/laSexta	14–18 Dec 2020	?	4.50	3.64	–	–	2.00	3.01	–	–	3.31	–
DYM/Henneo	15–17 Dec 2020	1,000	3.5	3.2	–	–	2.4	2.7	–	–	3.9	–
CIS	1–9 Dec 2020	3,817	4.4	3.4	–	–	2.3	3.3	–	–	3.6	–
Sigma Dos/Antena 3	7 Dec 2020	?	3.5	3.4	–	–	2.2	2.6	–	–	3.5	–
SW Demoscopia/infoLibre	26 Nov–5 Dec 2020	1,237	3.9	3.5	–	–	2.4	2.8	–	–	3.9	–
SocioMétrica/El Español	19–21 Nov 2020	2,088	3.5	2.8	–	–	2.7	2.7	–	–	3.4	–
DYM/Henneo	18–20 Nov 2020	1,001	3.5	3.3	–	–	2.6	2.6	–	–	3.8	–
CIS	3–12 Nov 2020	3,853	4.4	3.2	–	–	2.1	3.3	–	–	3.4	–
DYM/Henneo	22–23 Oct 2020	1,006	3.5	3.4	–	–	2.5	2.7	–	–	4.0	–
Sigma Dos/El Mundo	22–23 Oct 2020	1,000	4.0	3.6	–	–	2.2	2.9	–	–	3.6	–
SocioMétrica/El Español	15–17 Oct 2020	2,103	3.5	2.6	–	–	2.7	2.7	–	–	3.7	–
Sigma Dos/Antena 3	10 Oct 2020	?	3.7	3.1	–	–	2.2	2.6	–	–	3.3	–
InvyMark/laSexta	5–9 Oct 2020	?	4.46	3.24	–	–	2.10	3.05	–	–	2.95	–
CIS	1–7 Oct 2020	2,924	4.5	3.1	–	–	2.4	3.3	–	–	3.5	–
SocioMétrica/El Español	25–27 Sep 2020	2,307	3.6	2.7	–	–	2.8	2.6	–	–	4.0	–
DYM/Henneo	16–20 Sep 2020	1,008	3.6	3.1	–	–	2.6	2.7	–	–	3.8	–
InvyMark/laSexta	7–11 Sep 2020	?	4.61	3.21	–	–	2.20	3.35	–	–	3.25	–
CIS	1–7 Sep 2020	2,904	4.6	3.2	–	–	2.3	3.3	–	–	3.7	–
Sigma Dos/Antena 3	6 Sep 2020	?	3.56	3.34	–	–	2.52	2.50	–	–	3.54	–
SocioMétrica/El Español	28–30 Aug 2020	1,620	3.7	3.0	–	–	3.0	2.7	–	–	4.5	–
SW Demoscopia	19–21 Aug 2020	1,001	4.88	3.62	–	–	2.55	3.14	–	–	4.45	–
InvyMark/laSexta	20–24 Jul 2020	?	5.05	3.14	–	–	1.90	3.55	–	–	3.35	–
IMOP/CIS	1–9 Jul 2020	3,032	4.9	3.6	–	–	2.5	3.6	–	–	4.1	–
DYM/Henneo	24–27 Jun 2020	1,000	3.8	3.4	–	–	2.6	2.9	–	–	4.1	–
Sigma Dos/El Mundo	15–17 Jun 2020	1,000	4.21	3.45	–	–	2.55	3.15	–	–	3.93	–
IMOP/CIS	1–9 Jun 2020	4,258	4.9	3.4	–	–	2.3	3.7	–	–	3.9	–
SocioMétrica/El Español	27–29 May 2020	1,872	4.1	3.7	–	–	3.0	3.4	–	–	4.0	–
DYM/Henneo	21–24 May 2020	1,041	3.8	3.1	–	–	2.4	3.0	–	–	4.1	–
Sigma Dos/Antena 3	17 May 2020	?	4.13	3.68	–	–	2.43	3.10	–	–	4.14	–
Intercampo/CIS	4–13 May 2020	3,800	4.9	3.8	–	–	2.6	3.6	–	–	4.3	–
SW Demoscopia	5–8 May 2020	1,104	4.35	3.79	–	–	2.94	3.37	–	–	4.28	–
Sináptica/Público	28 Apr–4 May 2020	1,001	3.76	2.72	–	–	1.93	3.25	–	–	3.53	–
InvyMark/laSexta	27 Apr–1 May 2020	?	5.11	3.63	–	–	2.40	3.89	–	–	3.65	–
DYM/Henneo	23–25 Apr 2020	1,000	3.7	3.7	–	–	2.7	3.0	–	–	3.9	–
SocioMétrica/El Español	21–24 Apr 2020	1,200	4.3	3.9	–	–	3.0	3.5	–	–	4.2	–
Sigma Dos/El Mundo	13–15 Apr 2020	1,000	4.18	3.94	–	–	2.48	3.20	–	–	3.82	–
Intercampo/CIS	30 Mar–7 Apr 2020	3,000	5.0	4.2	–	–	3.0	3.7	–	–	4.3	–
Sigma Dos/Antena 3	25 Mar–1 Apr 2020	?	4.97	4.78	–	–	3.13	3.64	–	–	4.27	–
SW Demoscopia	27–31 Mar 2020	1,102	3.79	3.68	–	–	3.04	3.26	–	–	3.66	–
DYM/Henneo	26–27 Mar 2020	1,001	3.8	3.5	–	–	2.7	3.0	–	–	3.7	–
CIS	1–13 Mar 2020	3,912	4.4	3.5	–	–	2.6	3.5	–	–	3.3	3.3
SocioMétrica/El Español	5 Mar 2020	?	3.8	3.2	–	–	3.3	3.6	–	–	4.3	–
SW Demoscopia	24–28 Feb 2020	1,302	4.12	3.85	–	–	3.23	3.43	–	–	3.77	–
InvyMark/laSexta	17–21 Feb 2020	?	4.89	3.58	–	–	2.56	4.03	–	–	–	–
CIS	1–11 Feb 2020	2,957	4.5	3.7	–	–	2.8	3.7	–	–	3.5	3.3
InvyMark/laSexta	27–31 Jan 2020	?	4.97	3.60	–	–	2.38	3.95	–	–	–	3.23
SW Demoscopia	27–31 Jan 2020	1,307	4.02	3.82	–	–	3.21	3.44	–	–	3.88	–
SocioMétrica/El Español	15–18 Jan 2020	1,100	3.8	3.0	–	–	3.2	3.5	–	–	4.1	–
CIS	2–13 Jan 2020	2,929	4.2	3.3	–	–	2.6	3.5	–	–	3.3	3.3
InvyMark/laSexta	7–10 Jan 2020	?	5.14	3.50	–	–	2.29	3.97	–	–	–	2.97
GAD3/ABC	7–10 Jan 2020	1,000	3.9	4.2	–	–	3.2	3.3	–	–	3.9	–
SW Demoscopia	30 Dec–2 Jan 2020	1,304	3.96	3.75	–	–	3.15	3.38	–	–	4.11	–
SocioMétrica/El Español	24–31 Dec 2019	1,800	3.6	3.4	–	–	3.4	3.6	–	–	4.3	–
Sigma Dos/El Mundo	26–27 Dec 2019	1,000	3.95	3.74	–	–	3.32	3.86	–	–	4.09	3.91
SocioMétrica/El Español	20–21 Dec 2019	2,160	3.5	3.8	–	–	3.4	3.4	–	–	4.8	3.9
CIS	29 Nov–19 Dec 2019	4,800	4.1	3.6	–	–	2.8	3.5	–	–	3.6	3.3
InvyMark/laSexta	9–13 Dec 2019	?	4.97	3.53	–	–	2.20	4.26	–	–	–	2.97
ElectoPanel/Electomanía	10–12 Dec 2019	1,000	3.6	3.4	–	–	2.8	4.1	–	–	4.2	3.3

== Approval ratings ==
The tables below list the public approval ratings of the leaders and leading candidates of the main political parties in Spain.

=== Pedro Sánchez ===
Polling firm/Commissioner	Fieldwork date	Sample size	Pedro Sánchez (PSOE)			
Polling firm/Commissioner	Fieldwork date	Sample size	check	X mark	Question	Net
Simple Lógica/elDiario.es	5–13 Jul 2023	1,300	43.1	?	?	−?
Simple Lógica/elDiario.es	4–12 Jul 2023	1,300	42.4	?	?	−?
Simple Lógica/elDiario.es	3–11 Jul 2023	1,300	43.4	?	?	−?
Simple Lógica/elDiario.es	3–10 Jul 2023	997	43.6	51.5	4.9	−7.9
Simple Lógica/elDiario.es	1–8 Jun 2023	1,027	36.4	60.4	3.2	−24.0
Simple Lógica/elDiario.es	3–11 May 2023	1,013	36.3	58.6	5.1	−22.3
Simple Lógica/elDiario.es	3–12 Apr 2023	1,014	38.0	56.9	5.2	−18.9
Simple Lógica/elDiario.es	1–7 Mar 2023	1,028	34.9	59.8	5.4	−24.9
Simple Lógica/elDiario.es	1–7 Feb 2023	1,240	36.7	58.8	4.5	−22.1
Simple Lógica/elDiario.es	2–10 Jan 2023	1,012	38.3	57.0	4.7	−18.7
Simple Lógica/elDiario.es	1–13 Dec 2022	1,029	36.9	57.0	6.1	−20.1
Simple Lógica/elDiario.es	2–11 Nov 2022	996	36.4	58.5	5.1	−22.1
Simple Lógica/elDiario.es	3–14 Oct 2022	1,048	38.5	55.5	6.0	−17.0
Simple Lógica/elDiario.es	1–9 Sep 2022	1,044	32.8	61.9	5.3	−29.1
Simple Lógica/elDiario.es	1–8 Aug 2022	1,078	36.1	56.7	7.2	−20.6
Simple Lógica/elDiario.es	1–11 Jul 2022	1,044	30.9	63.8	5.3	−32.9
Simple Lógica/elDiario.es	1–9 Jun 2022	1,055	33.5	60.0	6.4	−26.5
Simple Lógica/elDiario.es	3–11 May 2022	1,049	36.3	?	?	−?
Simple Lógica/elDiario.es	1–7 Apr 2022	1,048	37.1	57.7	5.2	−20.6
Simple Lógica/elDiario.es	1–10 Mar 2022	1,083	36.8	56.2	7.1	−19.4
Metroscopia	1–2 Mar 2022	900	40.0	58.0	2.0	−18.0
Simple Lógica/elDiario.es	1–10 Feb 2022	1,903	37.0	56.3	6.6	−19.3
Simple Lógica/elDiario.es	3–13 Jan 2022	1,039	32.8	61.4	5.8	−28.6
Simple Lógica	1–13 Dec 2021	1,041	33.3	61.1	5.6	−27.8
SW Demoscopia/Publicaciones Sur	23–24 Nov 2021	610	42.5	57.5	−	−15.0
Simple Lógica	30 Oct–15 Nov 2021	1,026	31.4	60.2	8.5	−28.8
Simple Lógica	30 Sep–15 Oct 2021	1,056	33.1	59.6	7.3	−26.5
Simple Lógica	1–16 Sep 2021	1,027	33.8	59.8	6.4	−26.0
Simple Lógica	2–4 Aug 2021	1,062	36.2	57.4	6.4	−21.2
Simple Lógica	5–12 Jul 2021	1,076	33.7	58.2	8.1	−24.5
Simple Lógica	1–9 Jun 2021	1,017	32.5	61.1	6.4	−28.6
Simple Lógica	4–12 May 2021	1,063	30.2	62.9	6.8	−32.7
Simple Lógica	5–13 Apr 2021	1,053	35.1	59.3	5.6	−24.2
Simple Lógica	1–9 Mar 2021	1,023	33.7	59.9	6.4	−26.2
Simple Lógica	1–5 Feb 2021	1,054	32.0	58.4	9.6	−26.4
Simple Lógica	4–13 Jan 2021	1,045	37.7	56.0	6.4	−18.3
Simple Lógica	30 Nov–9 Dec 2020	1,065	36.7	56.3	7.0	−19.6
Simple Lógica	4–11 Nov 2020	1,036	37.4	55.6	7.0	−18.2
Simple Lógica	1–9 Oct 2020	1,060	36.1	55.9	8.0	−19.8
Metroscopia	15 Sep 2020	?	41.0	?	?	−?
Simple Lógica	1–11 Sep 2020	1,065	38.5	54.5	7.0	−16.0
Metroscopia	9 Aug 2020	?	50.0	?	?	+?
Simple Lógica	3–6 Aug 2020	1,046	45.5	45.8	8.8	−0.3
Metroscopia	11 Jul 2020	?	50.0	?	?	+?
Simple Lógica	1–8 Jul 2020	1,035	40.3	49.7	10.0	−9.4
Metroscopia	7 Jun 2020	?	50.0	?	?	+?
Simple Lógica	1–5 Jun 2020	1,012	37.2	57.2	5.6	−20.0
Simple Lógica	4–8 May 2020	1,019	45.4	48.4	6.2	−3.0
Metroscopia	7 May 2020	?	50.0	?	?	+?
Metroscopia	4–6 May 2020	?	45.0	?	?	−?
Metroscopia	27–30 Apr 2020	?	45.0	?	?	−?
Metroscopia	20–24 Apr 2020	?	42.0	?	?	−?
GESOP	13–17 Apr 2020	750	46.1	44.4	9.4	+1.7
Metroscopia	15–16 Apr 2020	?	51.0	?	?	+?
Metroscopia	6–8 Apr 2020	?	49.0	?	?	+?
Simple Lógica	1–7 Apr 2020	1,057	34.9	55.3	9.8	−20.4
Metroscopia	30 Mar–2 Apr 2020	1,637	44.0	?	?	−?
SW Demoscopia	17–19 Mar 2020	1,001	53.4	46.6	–	+6.8
Metroscopia	25 Feb–13 Mar 2020	4,240	46.0	?	?	−?
Simple Lógica	2–6 Mar 2020	1,029	39.6	51.3	9.1	−11.7
Simple Lógica	3–11 Feb 2020	1,073	39.6	53.5	6.9	−13.9
Metroscopia	13–29 Jan 2020	4,237	47.0	?	?	−?
Simple Lógica	7–10 Jan 2020	1,097	33.6	62.4	4.0	−28.8
SocioMétrica/El Español	20–21 Dec 2019	2,160	30.2	61.2	8.6	−31.0
Simple Lógica	2–12 Dec 2019	1,064	33.1	60.8	6.1	−27.7

=== Alberto Núñez Feijóo ===
Polling firm/Commissioner	Fieldwork date	Sample size	Alberto Núñez Feijóo (PP)			
Polling firm/Commissioner	Fieldwork date	Sample size	check	X mark	Question	Net
Simple Lógica/elDiario.es	5–13 Jul 2023	1,300	31.1	?	?	−?
Simple Lógica/elDiario.es	4–12 Jul 2023	1,300	29.6	?	?	−?
Simple Lógica/elDiario.es	3–11 Jul 2023	1,300	29.4	?	?	−?
Simple Lógica/elDiario.es	3–10 Jul 2023	997	29.8	60.1	10.1	−30.3
Simple Lógica/elDiario.es	1–8 Jun 2023	1,027	31.2	57.5	11.2	−26.3
Simple Lógica/elDiario.es	3–11 May 2023	1,013	25.7	63.4	11.0	−37.7
Simple Lógica/elDiario.es	3–12 Apr 2023	1,014	21.1	67.9	11.0	−46.8
Simple Lógica/elDiario.es	1–7 Mar 2023	1,028	25.0	63.5	11.5	−38.5
Simple Lógica/elDiario.es	1–7 Feb 2023	1,240	23.6	63.7	12.7	−40.1
Simple Lógica/elDiario.es	2–10 Jan 2023	1,012	24.8	63.8	11.4	−39.0
Simple Lógica/elDiario.es	1–13 Dec 2022	1,029	24.6	63.6	11.8	−39.0
Simple Lógica/elDiario.es	2–11 Nov 2022	996	26.8	59.5	13.7	−32.7
Simple Lógica/elDiario.es	3–14 Oct 2022	1,048	29.0	55.3	15.7	−26.3
Simple Lógica/elDiario.es	1–9 Sep 2022	1,044	30.3	54.0	15.7	−23.7
Simple Lógica/elDiario.es	1–8 Aug 2022	1,078	32.8	51.2	15.9	−18.4
Simple Lógica/elDiario.es	1–11 Jul 2022	1,044	35.1	49.7	15.2	−14.6
Simple Lógica/elDiario.es	1–9 Jun 2022	1,055	31.0	50.2	18.9	−19.2
Simple Lógica/elDiario.es	3–11 May 2022	1,049	36.4	?	?	−?
Simple Lógica/elDiario.es	1–7 Apr 2022	1,048	37.1	42.8	20.0	−5.7
Simple Lógica/elDiario.es	1–10 Mar 2022	1,083	42.6	32.0	25.4	+10.6
Metroscopia	1–2 Mar 2022	900	49.0	33.0	18.0	+16.0

=== Pablo Casado ===
Polling firm/Commissioner	Fieldwork date	Sample size	Pablo Casado (PP)			
Polling firm/Commissioner	Fieldwork date	Sample size	check	X mark	Question	Net
Simple Lógica/elDiario.es	1–10 Mar 2022	1,083	9.3	82.2	8.5	−72.9
Simple Lógica/elDiario.es	1–10 Feb 2022	1,903	14.4	78.4	7.2	−64.0
Simple Lógica/elDiario.es	3–13 Jan 2022	1,039	16.8	78.4	5.8	−61.6
Simple Lógica	1–13 Dec 2021	1,041	16.7	77.1	6.1	−60.4
SW Demoscopia/Publicaciones Sur	23–24 Nov 2021	610	20.4	79.6	−	−59.2
Simple Lógica	30 Oct–15 Nov 2021	1,026	17.2	73.9	9.0	−56.7
Simple Lógica	30 Sep–15 Oct 2021	1,056	18.5	72.7	8.9	−54.2
Simple Lógica	1–16 Sep 2021	1,027	15.5	75.9	8.6	−60.4
Simple Lógica	2–4 Aug 2021	1,062	17.3	74.1	8.6	−56.8
Simple Lógica	5–12 Jul 2021	1,076	18.5	71.5	9.9	−53.0
Simple Lógica	1–9 Jun 2021	1,017	19.3	73.4	8.6	−54.1
Simple Lógica	4–12 May 2021	1,063	20.9	70.4	8.8	−49.5
Simple Lógica	5–13 Apr 2021	1,053	14.6	79.4	6.0	−64.8
Simple Lógica	1–9 Mar 2021	1,023	14.9	78.7	6.4	−63.8
Simple Lógica	1–5 Feb 2021	1,054	15.5	74.8	9.6	−59.3
Simple Lógica	4–13 Jan 2021	1,045	19.5	72.7	7.7	−53.2
Simple Lógica	30 Nov–9 Dec 2020	1,065	16.6	74.6	8.7	−58.0
Simple Lógica	4–11 Nov 2020	1,036	15.2	76.3	8.5	−61.1
Simple Lógica	1–9 Oct 2020	1,060	16.6	72.9	10.5	−56.3
Metroscopia	15 Sep 2020	?	19.0	?	?	−?
Simple Lógica	1–11 Sep 2020	1,065	21.0	70.3	8.7	−49.3
Metroscopia	9 Aug 2020	?	20.0	?	?	−?
Simple Lógica	3–6 Aug 2020	1,046	19.9	69.7	10.4	−49.8
Simple Lógica	1–8 Jul 2020	1,035	19.7	69.0	11.3	−49.3
Simple Lógica	1–5 Jun 2020	1,012	19.2	73.2	7.6	−54.0
Simple Lógica	4–8 May 2020	1,019	22.7	68.6	8.7	−45.9
Metroscopia	7 May 2020	?	27.0	?	?	−?
Metroscopia	4–6 May 2020	?	26.0	?	?	−?
Metroscopia	27–30 Apr 2020	?	26.0	?	?	−?
Metroscopia	20–24 Apr 2020	?	28.0	?	?	−?
Metroscopia	15–16 Apr 2020	?	31.0	?	?	−?
Metroscopia	6–8 Apr 2020	?	31.0	?	?	−?
Simple Lógica	1–7 Apr 2020	1,057	20.9	67.6	11.5	−46.7
Metroscopia	30 Mar–2 Apr 2020	1,637	28.0	?	?	−?
SW Demoscopia	17–19 Mar 2020	1,001	50.2	49.8	–	+0.4
Metroscopia	25 Feb–13 Mar 2020	4,240	27.0	?	?	−?
Simple Lógica	2–6 Mar 2020	1,029	20.2	69.8	10.0	−49.6
Simple Lógica	3–11 Feb 2020	1,073	21.2	71.6	7.2	−50.4
Metroscopia	13–29 Jan 2020	4,237	30.0	?	?	−?
Simple Lógica	7–10 Jan 2020	1,097	22.0	73.2	4.8	−51.2
SocioMétrica/El Español	20–21 Dec 2019	2,160	32.3	57.4	10.4	−25.1
Simple Lógica	2–12 Dec 2019	1,064	22.3	71.1	6.7	−48.8

=== Santiago Abascal ===
Polling firm/Commissioner	Fieldwork date	Sample size	Santiago Abascal (Vox)			
Polling firm/Commissioner	Fieldwork date	Sample size	check	X mark	Question	Net
Simple Lógica/elDiario.es	5–13 Jul 2023	1,300	18.9	?	?	−?
Simple Lógica/elDiario.es	4–12 Jul 2023	1,300	18.2	?	?	−?
Simple Lógica/elDiario.es	3–11 Jul 2023	1,300	17.4	?	?	−?
Simple Lógica/elDiario.es	3–10 Jul 2023	997	18.4	73.7	7.9	−55.3
Simple Lógica/elDiario.es	1–8 Jun 2023	1,027	20.3	73.1	6.5	−52.8
Simple Lógica/elDiario.es	3–11 May 2023	1,013	17.1	74.8	8.1	−57.7
Simple Lógica/elDiario.es	3–12 Apr 2023	1,014	14.5	77.2	8.3	−62.7
Simple Lógica/elDiario.es	1–7 Mar 2023	1,028	16.9	75.8	7.3	−58.9
Simple Lógica/elDiario.es	1–7 Feb 2023	1,240	13.5	77.9	8.6	−64.4
Simple Lógica/elDiario.es	2–10 Jan 2023	1,012	16.4	75.4	8.2	−59.0
Simple Lógica/elDiario.es	1–13 Dec 2022	1,029	15.8	75.2	9.0	−59.4
Simple Lógica/elDiario.es	2–11 Nov 2022	996	13.8	76.5	9.7	−62.7
Simple Lógica/elDiario.es	3–14 Oct 2022	1,048	13.6	77.5	9.0	−63.9
Simple Lógica/elDiario.es	1–9 Sep 2022	1,044	16.9	73.7	9.4	−56.8
Simple Lógica/elDiario.es	1–8 Aug 2022	1,078	16.1	74.1	9.8	−58.0
Simple Lógica/elDiario.es	1–11 Jul 2022	1,044	16.3	75.3	8.4	−59.0
Simple Lógica/elDiario.es	1–9 Jun 2022	1,055	18.5	69.2	12.3	−50.7
Simple Lógica/elDiario.es	3–11 May 2022	1,049	17.8	?	?	−?
Simple Lógica/elDiario.es	1–7 Apr 2022	1,048	19.1	72.3	8.6	−53.2
Simple Lógica/elDiario.es	1–10 Mar 2022	1,083	15.4	75.0	9.5	−59.6
Simple Lógica/elDiario.es	1–10 Feb 2022	1,903	14.0	77.4	8.6	−63.4
Simple Lógica/elDiario.es	3–13 Jan 2022	1,039	15.4	76.8	7.8	−61.4
Simple Lógica	1–13 Dec 2021	1,041	16.6	76.2	7.2	−59.6
SW Demoscopia/Publicaciones Sur	23–24 Nov 2021	610	18.7	81.3	−	−62.6
Simple Lógica	30 Oct–15 Nov 2021	1,026	17.5	72.3	10.2	−54.8
Simple Lógica	30 Sep–15 Oct 2021	1,056	16.8	74.4	8.8	−57.6
Simple Lógica	1–16 Sep 2021	1,027	14.9	76.1	9.0	−61.2
Simple Lógica	2–4 Aug 2021	1,062	15.3	74.9	9.7	−59.6
Simple Lógica	5–12 Jul 2021	1,076	15.8	74.0	10.1	−58.2
Simple Lógica	1–9 Jun 2021	1,017	16.2	76.3	7.5	−60.1
Simple Lógica	4–12 May 2021	1,063	16.8	75.0	8.2	−58.2
Simple Lógica	5–13 Apr 2021	1,053	15.6	77.2	7.2	−61.6
Simple Lógica	1–9 Mar 2021	1,023	14.6	77.5	7.8	−62.9
Simple Lógica	1–5 Feb 2021	1,054	13.0	76.8	10.2	−63.8
Simple Lógica	4–13 Jan 2021	1,045	12.9	78.0	9.0	−65.1
Simple Lógica	30 Nov–9 Dec 2020	1,065	12.5	78.5	9.0	−66.0
Simple Lógica	4–11 Nov 2020	1,036	11.4	80.2	8.4	−68.8
Simple Lógica	1–9 Oct 2020	1,060	13.9	75.0	11.1	−61.1
Metroscopia	15 Sep 2020	?	15.0	?	?	−?
Simple Lógica	1–11 Sep 2020	1,065	15.2	75.1	9.7	−59.9
Simple Lógica	3–6 Aug 2020	1,046	12.2	77.0	10.8	−64.8
Simple Lógica	1–8 Jul 2020	1,035	13.1	75.4	11.5	−62.3
Simple Lógica	1–5 Jun 2020	1,012	15.4	77.1	7.5	−61.7
Simple Lógica	4–8 May 2020	1,019	13.8	77.2	9.0	−63.4
Metroscopia	7 May 2020	?	19.0	?	?	−?
Metroscopia	4–6 May 2020	?	15.0	?	?	−?
Metroscopia	27–30 Apr 2020	?	17.0	?	?	−?
Metroscopia	20–24 Apr 2020	?	15.0	?	?	−?
Metroscopia	15–16 Apr 2020	?	15.0	?	?	−?
Metroscopia	6–8 Apr 2020	?	15.0	?	?	−?
Simple Lógica	1–7 Apr 2020	1,057	14.6	73.6	11.9	−59.0
Metroscopia	30 Mar–2 Apr 2020	1,637	20.0	?	?	−?
Metroscopia	25 Feb–13 Mar 2020	4,240	23.0	?	?	−?
Simple Lógica	2–6 Mar 2020	1,029	14.9	74.3	10.7	−59.4
Simple Lógica	3–11 Feb 2020	1,073	15.0	77.3	7.7	−62.3
Metroscopia	13–29 Jan 2020	4,237	22.0	?	?	−?
Simple Lógica	7–10 Jan 2020	1,097	17.9	76.1	6.0	−58.2
SocioMétrica/El Español	20–21 Dec 2019	2,160	28.4	60.4	11.2	−32.0
Simple Lógica	2–12 Dec 2019	1,064	17.8	75.2	6.9	−57.4

=== Yolanda Díaz ===
Polling firm/Commissioner	Fieldwork date	Sample size	Yolanda Díaz (Unidas Podemos/Sumar)			
Polling firm/Commissioner	Fieldwork date	Sample size	check	X mark	Question	Net
Simple Lógica/elDiario.es	5–13 Jul 2023	1,300	42.3	?	?	−?
Simple Lógica/elDiario.es	4–12 Jul 2023	1,300	39.7	?	?	−?
Simple Lógica/elDiario.es	3–11 Jul 2023	1,300	39.7	?	?	−?
Simple Lógica/elDiario.es	3–10 Jul 2023	997	39.6	52.5	7.9	−12.9
Simple Lógica/elDiario.es	1–8 Jun 2023	1,027	40.7	52.1	7.2	−11.4
Simple Lógica/elDiario.es	3–11 May 2023	1,013	39.7	50.3	10.1	−10.6
Simple Lógica/elDiario.es	3–12 Apr 2023	1,014	40.4	49.4	10.2	−9.0
Simple Lógica/elDiario.es	1–7 Mar 2023	1,028	37.6	51.0	11.4	−13.4
Simple Lógica/elDiario.es	1–7 Feb 2023	1,240	41.5	48.3	10.2	−6.8
Simple Lógica/elDiario.es	2–10 Jan 2023	1,012	39.4	51.9	8.7	−12.5
Simple Lógica/elDiario.es	1–13 Dec 2022	1,029	35.4	52.7	11.9	−17.3
Simple Lógica/elDiario.es	2–11 Nov 2022	996	37.4	50.8	11.8	−13.4
Simple Lógica/elDiario.es	3–14 Oct 2022	1,048	39.1	48.9	12.0	−9.8
Simple Lógica/elDiario.es	1–9 Sep 2022	1,044	35.2	53.5	11.3	−18.3
Simple Lógica/elDiario.es	1–8 Aug 2022	1,078	39.4	49.9	10.6	−10.5
Simple Lógica/elDiario.es	1–11 Jul 2022	1,044	34.2	54.2	11.6	−20.0
Simple Lógica/elDiario.es	1–9 Jun 2022	1,055	37.7	50.1	12.3	−12.4
Simple Lógica/elDiario.es	3–11 May 2022	1,049	42.9	?	?	−?
Simple Lógica/elDiario.es	1–7 Apr 2022	1,048	40.5	49.7	9.9	−9.2
Simple Lógica/elDiario.es	1–10 Mar 2022	1,083	38.4	49.7	11.9	−11.3
Simple Lógica/elDiario.es	1–10 Feb 2022	1,903	38.9	49.8	11.3	−10.9
Simple Lógica/elDiario.es	3–13 Jan 2022	1,039	35.2	53.4	11.4	−18.2
Simple Lógica	1–13 Dec 2021	1,041	33.6	55.2	11.1	−21.6
SW Demoscopia/Publicaciones Sur	23–24 Nov 2021	610	39.3	60.7	−	−21.4
Simple Lógica	30 Oct–15 Nov 2021	1,026	34.3	51.1	14.6	−16.8
Simple Lógica	30 Sep–15 Oct 2021	1,056	32.1	52.7	15.2	−20.6
Simple Lógica	1–16 Sep 2021	1,027	30.6	52.9	16.5	−22.3
Simple Lógica	2–4 Aug 2021	1,062	32.4	51.8	15.8	−19.4
Simple Lógica	5–12 Jul 2021	1,076	32.5	49.0	18.4	−16.5
Simple Lógica	1–9 Jun 2021	1,017	32.8	53.4	13.9	−20.6

=== Pablo Iglesias ===
Polling firm/Commissioner	Fieldwork date	Sample size	Pablo Iglesias (Unidas Podemos)			
Polling firm/Commissioner	Fieldwork date	Sample size	check	X mark	Question	Net
Simple Lógica	4–12 May 2021	1,063	18.2	74.8	7.0	−56.6
Simple Lógica	5–13 Apr 2021	1,053	17.9	75.9	6.2	−58.0
Simple Lógica	1–9 Mar 2021	1,023	17.2	76.1	6.7	−58.9
Simple Lógica	1–5 Feb 2021	1,054	18.9	72.2	8.9	−53.3
Simple Lógica	4–13 Jan 2021	1,045	22.9	70.0	7.1	−47.1
Simple Lógica	30 Nov–9 Dec 2020	1,065	22.6	69.5	7.9	−46.9
Simple Lógica	4–11 Nov 2020	1,036	22.1	70.5	7.4	−48.4
Simple Lógica	1–9 Oct 2020	1,060	20.7	69.3	10.0	−48.6
Metroscopia	15 Sep 2020	?	23.0	?	?	−?
Simple Lógica	1–11 Sep 2020	1,065	22.7	69.1	8.2	−46.4
Metroscopia	9 Aug 2020	?	35.0	?	?	−?
Simple Lógica	3–6 Aug 2020	1,046	26.0	64.2	9.9	−38.2
Simple Lógica	1–8 Jul 2020	1,035	24.7	64.3	11.0	−39.6
Simple Lógica	1–5 Jun 2020	1,012	26.6	67.1	6.3	−40.5
Simple Lógica	4–8 May 2020	1,019	30.7	60.8	8.5	−30.1
Metroscopia	7 May 2020	?	36.0	?	?	−?
Metroscopia	4–6 May 2020	?	32.0	?	?	−?
Metroscopia	27–30 Apr 2020	?	32.0	?	?	−?
Metroscopia	20–24 Apr 2020	?	30.0	?	?	−?
Metroscopia	15–16 Apr 2020	?	37.0	?	?	−?
Metroscopia	6–8 Apr 2020	?	31.0	?	?	−?
Simple Lógica	1–7 Apr 2020	1,057	24.1	65.3	10.6	−41.2
Metroscopia	30 Mar–2 Apr 2020	1,637	30.0	?	?	−?
SW Demoscopia	17–19 Mar 2020	1,001	35.2	64.8	–	−29.6
Metroscopia	25 Feb–13 Mar 2020	4,240	40.0	?	?	−?
Simple Lógica	2–6 Mar 2020	1,029	31.2	60.2	8.6	−29.0
Simple Lógica	3–11 Feb 2020	1,073	34.4	59.2	6.4	−24.8
Metroscopia	13–29 Jan 2020	4,237	44.0	?	?	−?
Simple Lógica	7–10 Jan 2020	1,097	31.3	63.8	4.9	−32.5
SocioMétrica/El Español	20–21 Dec 2019	2,160	29.4	60.9	9.6	−31.5
Simple Lógica	2–12 Dec 2019	1,064	30.8	63.1	6.1	−32.3

=== Íñigo Errejón ===
Polling firm/Commissioner	Fieldwork date	Sample size	Íñigo Errejón (Más País)			
Polling firm/Commissioner	Fieldwork date	Sample size	check	X mark	Question	Net
Simple Lógica/elDiario.es	1–8 Jun 2023	1,027	32.6	58.5	8.9	−25.9
Simple Lógica/elDiario.es	3–11 May 2023	1,013	33.6	56.1	10.3	−22.5
Simple Lógica/elDiario.es	3–12 Apr 2023	1,014	31.4	57.1	11.5	−25.7
Simple Lógica/elDiario.es	1–7 Mar 2023	1,028	31.4	56.5	12.1	−25.1
Simple Lógica/elDiario.es	1–7 Feb 2023	1,240	32.6	55.5	11.9	−22.9
Simple Lógica/elDiario.es	2–10 Jan 2023	1,012	33.9	54.8	11.3	−20.9
Simple Lógica/elDiario.es	1–13 Dec 2022	1,029	28.8	57.6	13.5	−28.8
Simple Lógica/elDiario.es	2–11 Nov 2022	996	29.6	56.7	13.7	−27.1
Simple Lógica/elDiario.es	3–14 Oct 2022	1,048	32.7	54.6	12.6	−21.9
Simple Lógica/elDiario.es	1–9 Sep 2022	1,044	28.8	59.9	11.3	−31.1
Simple Lógica/elDiario.es	1–8 Aug 2022	1,078	33.1	53.6	13.2	−20.5
Simple Lógica/elDiario.es	1–11 Jul 2022	1,044	28.6	60.5	11.0	−31.9
Simple Lógica/elDiario.es	1–9 Jun 2022	1,055	27.6	57.6	14.8	−30.0
Simple Lógica/elDiario.es	3–11 May 2022	1,049	34.1	?	?	−?
Simple Lógica/elDiario.es	1–7 Apr 2022	1,048	33.7	55.1	11.2	−21.4
Simple Lógica/elDiario.es	1–10 Mar 2022	1,083	28.2	58.3	13.5	−30.1
Simple Lógica/elDiario.es	1–10 Feb 2022	1,903	32.7	55.1	12.3	−22.4
Simple Lógica/elDiario.es	3–13 Jan 2022	1,039	29.3	59.0	11.8	−29.7
Simple Lógica	1–13 Dec 2021	1,041	31.4	57.8	10.7	−26.4
Simple Lógica	30 Oct–15 Nov 2021	1,026	32.4	55.9	11.8	−23.5
Simple Lógica	30 Sep–15 Oct 2021	1,056	31.7	56.2	12.1	−24.5
Simple Lógica	1–16 Sep 2021	1,027	33.0	54.5	12.5	−21.5
Simple Lógica	2–4 Aug 2021	1,062	32.2	54.5	13.2	−22.3
Simple Lógica	5–12 Jul 2021	1,076	32.7	53.6	13.6	−20.9
Simple Lógica	1–9 Jun 2021	1,017	36.0	53.7	10.4	−17.7

=== Inés Arrimadas ===
Polling firm/Commissioner	Fieldwork date	Sample size	Inés Arrimadas (CS)			
Polling firm/Commissioner	Fieldwork date	Sample size	check	X mark	Question	Net
Simple Lógica/elDiario.es	3–11 May 2023	1,013	18.4	68.9	12.7	−50.5
Simple Lógica/elDiario.es	3–12 Apr 2023	1,014	14.7	73.3	12.0	−58.6
Simple Lógica/elDiario.es	1–7 Mar 2023	1,028	17.0	70.7	12.3	−53.7
Simple Lógica/elDiario.es	1–7 Feb 2023	1,240	18.4	68.8	12.8	−50.4
Simple Lógica/elDiario.es	2–10 Jan 2023	1,012	15.4	72.4	12.2	−57.0
Simple Lógica/elDiario.es	1–13 Dec 2022	1,029	18.3	70.1	11.6	−51.8
Simple Lógica/elDiario.es	2–11 Nov 2022	996	19.3	66.1	14.6	−46.8
Simple Lógica/elDiario.es	3–14 Oct 2022	1,048	19.3	67.3	13.4	−48.0
Simple Lógica/elDiario.es	1–9 Sep 2022	1,044	18.0	69.8	12.3	−51.8
Simple Lógica/elDiario.es	1–8 Aug 2022	1,078	18.5	68.3	13.2	−49.8
Simple Lógica/elDiario.es	1–11 Jul 2022	1,044	19.6	68.8	11.7	−49.2
Simple Lógica/elDiario.es	1–9 Jun 2022	1,055	19.8	65.3	14.9	−45.5
Simple Lógica/elDiario.es	3–11 May 2022	1,049	23.8	?	?	−?
Simple Lógica/elDiario.es	1–7 Apr 2022	1,048	24.5	62.2	13.3	−37.7
Simple Lógica/elDiario.es	1–10 Mar 2022	1,083	19.9	66.5	13.6	−46.6
Simple Lógica/elDiario.es	1–10 Feb 2022	1,903	23.8	64.7	11.5	−40.9
Simple Lógica/elDiario.es	3–13 Jan 2022	1,039	17.8	71.8	10.3	−54.0
Simple Lógica	1–13 Dec 2021	1,041	20.9	69.1	10.1	−48.2
SW Demoscopia/Publicaciones Sur	23–24 Nov 2021	610	17.9	82.1	−	−64.2
Simple Lógica	30 Oct–15 Nov 2021	1,026	19.0	66.2	14.9	−47.2
Simple Lógica	30 Sep–15 Oct 2021	1,056	20.2	67.3	12.5	−47.1
Simple Lógica	1–16 Sep 2021	1,027	20.5	67.6	11.9	−47.1
Simple Lógica	2–4 Aug 2021	1,062	19.5	68.2	12.2	−48.7
Simple Lógica	5–12 Jul 2021	1,076	19.6	66.0	14.4	−46.4
Simple Lógica	1–9 Jun 2021	1,017	17.8	71.1	11.1	−53.3
Simple Lógica	4–12 May 2021	1,063	20.2	68.8	11.0	−48.6
Simple Lógica	5–13 Apr 2021	1,053	21.0	71.5	7.6	−50.5
Simple Lógica	1–9 Mar 2021	1,023	23.2	67.9	8.9	−44.7
Simple Lógica	1–5 Feb 2021	1,054	24.6	63.3	12.1	−38.7
Simple Lógica	4–13 Jan 2021	1,045	29.8	59.1	11.1	−29.3
Simple Lógica	30 Nov–9 Dec 2020	1,065	31.2	57.7	11.1	−26.5
Simple Lógica	4–11 Nov 2020	1,036	26.9	61.4	11.7	−34.5
Simple Lógica	1–9 Oct 2020	1,060	28.2	57.8	14.0	−29.6
Metroscopia	15 Sep 2020	?	34.0	?	?	−?
Simple Lógica	1–11 Sep 2020	1,065	32.7	55.6	11.7	−22.9
Simple Lógica	3–6 Aug 2020	1,046	30.9	55.7	13.4	−24.8
Simple Lógica	1–8 Jul 2020	1,035	28.7	56.5	14.8	−27.8
Simple Lógica	1–5 Jun 2020	1,012	30.6	59.5	9.8	−28.9
Simple Lógica	4–8 May 2020	1,019	33.9	53.7	12.4	−19.8
Metroscopia	7 May 2020	?	52.0	?	?	+?
Metroscopia	4–6 May 2020	?	38.0	?	?	−?
Metroscopia	27–30 Apr 2020	?	32.0	?	?	−?
Metroscopia	20–24 Apr 2020	?	35.0	?	?	−?
Metroscopia	15–16 Apr 2020	?	46.0	?	?	−?
Metroscopia	6–8 Apr 2020	?	30.0	?	?	−?
Simple Lógica	1–7 Apr 2020	1,057	25.6	60.6	13.8	−35.0
Metroscopia	30 Mar–2 Apr 2020	1,637	32.0	?	?	−?
SW Demoscopia	17–19 Mar 2020	1,001	43.2	56.8	–	−13.6
Metroscopia	25 Feb–13 Mar 2020	4,240	35.0	?	?	−?
Simple Lógica	2–6 Mar 2020	1,029	26.9	61.0	12.1	−34.1
Simple Lógica	3–11 Feb 2020	1,073	30.1	60.7	9.2	−30.6
Metroscopia	13–29 Jan 2020	4,237	37.0	?	?	−?
Simple Lógica	7–10 Jan 2020	1,097	32.6	59.7	7.8	−27.1
SocioMétrica/El Español	20–21 Dec 2019	2,160	42.4	45.7	11.9	−3.3
Simple Lógica	2–12 Dec 2019	1,064	30.2	60.4	9.4	−30.2
