= Nationalisms in the Valencian Community =

Nationalisms in the Valencian Community may refer to:

- Valencian and/or Catalan nationalism
- Spanish nationalism
