= Valencian regionalism =

Regionalist movement in the Valencian region of Spain

Valencian regionalism is a cultural and political movement that advocates the revival of the identity (language, history, traditions and other distinctive features) of the region now within the Valencian Community in eastern Spain. Politically, the regionalists support the administrative decentralisation of the Spanish state and, for some, the recognition of Valencian foral law and increased autonomy for the Valencian Community. The movement emerged during the early years of the Bourbon restoration in the last third of the 19th century. It took political shape during the early 20th century, and persisted in a controlled and attenuated form through the Francoist State. After the restoration of democracy, the regionalist tendency was challenged by a Valencian nationalism with some left-wing and pan-Catalanist associations. Regionalism took on a right-wing and anti-Catalanist outlook which became known as Blaverism, and was represented politically by the Valencian Union until the absorption of that party into the People's Party in 2011.

== Origins ==
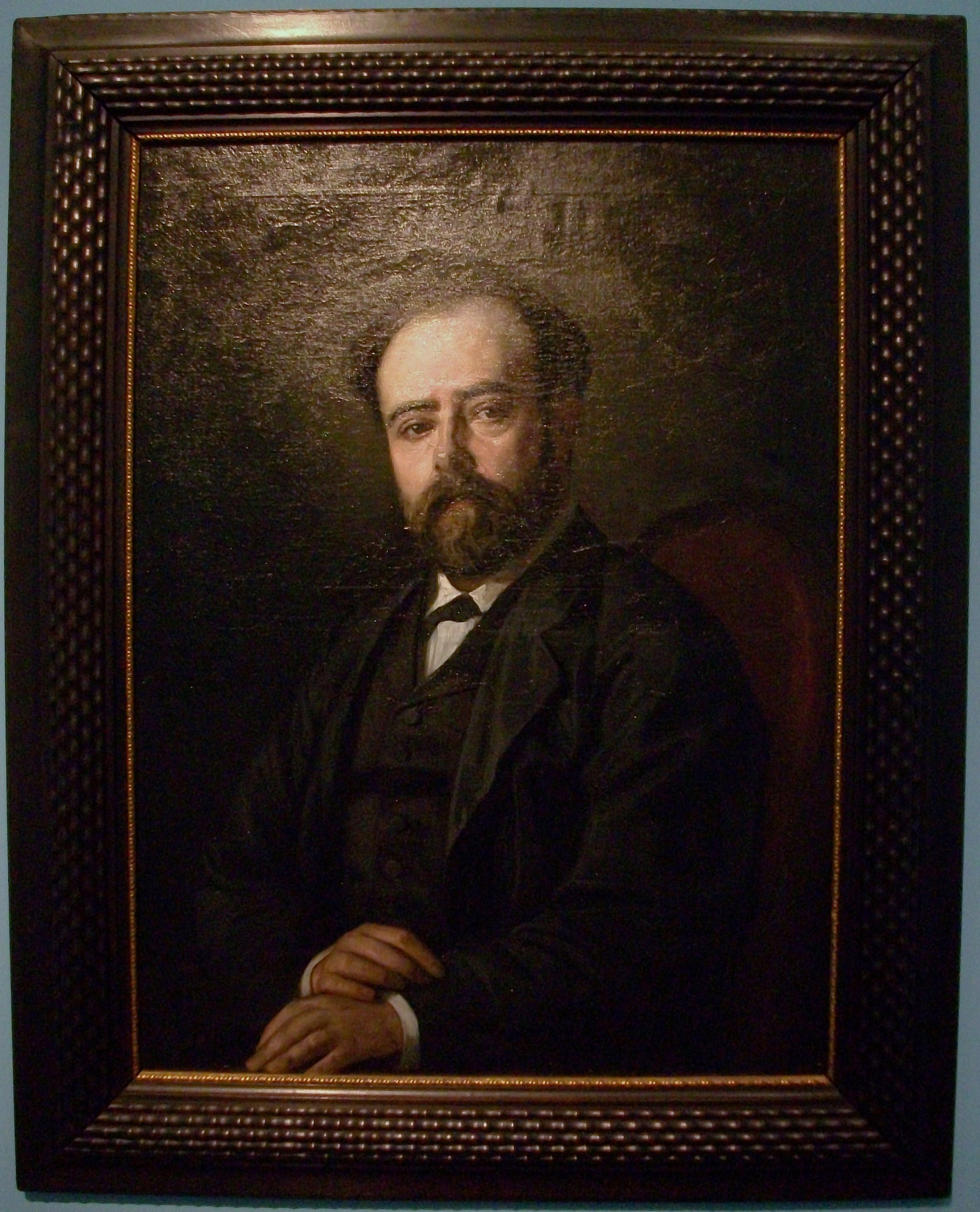
Teodor Llorente Olivares.

After 1808, supporters of liberalism, who were very influential in the Valencian region, started to disseminate a new view of Spanish identity. Breaking with all previous conceptions, this view was of marked nationalist character: it was argued that the disappearance of the Kingdom of Valencia one hundred years before had initiated the development of ethno-symbolic markers among the Valencian people, shaped by a shared memory of uneven scope, a language different from the official one, and a common demonym—"Valencian"—which officially referred only to the inhabitants of the Province of Valencia as defined in the territorial division of Spain of 1833. This was the context for the emergence of the basic features of what has been conceived as Valencian identity: features that have remained central to that identity up to the present day.

Valencian regionalism was inspired by the Catalan-language literary movement known as the Renaixença. In Valencia the movement was characterised by the predominance of an ideology that was conservative, regionalist and folklorical, values all represented by the figure of Teodor Llorente, the greatest literary exponent of the time and leader of the Renaixença movement. Llorente saw "Valencianity" (la valencianidad) from a regional perspective, subordinate to the idea of Spanish nationhood. Even though symbols of Valencian identity began to be constructed at the time of the Renaixença, the period at which the symbolism became more fixed was between 1878 (with the foundation of the Valencian cultural society Lo Rat Penat) and 1909 (with the Valencian Regional Exhibition), and this was when Valencian regionalism consolidated, its outlook becoming widespread among many groups in society.

Into the 20th century, Valencian regionalism started to become politicised, with the appearance of groups such as the es:Joventut Valencianista ("Valencianist Youth") and other collectives of young people who took Teodor Llorente and Lo Rat Penat as their point of reference. These movements came to be well regarded among conservative literary people, who themselves in time became engaged with the nascent political movement.

== Derecha Regional Valenciana ==
The Derecha Regional Valenciana ("Valencian Regional Right") party was founded in 1930, originating from a convergence of Carlist, agrarianist, Catholic and conservative groups. Its ideology was autonomist, and it was the first conservative political party active specifically in the Valencian region.

Its leaders included José Duato Chapa (founder of the Diario de Valencia newspaper), Manuel Simó Marín, Ignasi Villalonga i Villalba and above all Luis Lucia Lucia. Following outbreak of the Civil War the party ceased to operate and most of its leaders were persecuted. Simó Marín was executed, while Duato Chapa and Villalonga joined the Nationalists. Lucia declared loyalty to the government; in spite of it, he was twice arrested and spent most of the war either in hiding or in prison. He was condemned to death by Francoist Spain at the end of the war; the sentence was commuted to banishment to the Balearics only as a result of pressure from the Archbishopric of Valencia.

== Valencian regionalism during the Francoist State ==
After the victory of the Nationalist faction in the Civil War, local rights were fairly thoroughly integrated into the structure of the new state. Within this process, the cultural symbolism of Valencian regionalism persisted to some extent within society, as the state found ways to exploit such symbolism. Thus, during the Francoist State, regionalism took on a reactionary and melancholic tone.

In the post-war period, most of the component parts of Valencianism, in the main linked to the political left, were exiled or persecuted. However, Lo Rat Penat was able to remain active, after ridding itself of Valencian nationalists such as es:Xavier Casp and es:Miquel Adlert, whose activities had been tolerated in view of their firm Catholicism. In 1943 the publishing house es:Editorial Torre was founded: during the 1940s it was the only publisher in the Valencian language, operating under financially precarious and semi-clandestine conditions. Its publications were able to avoid the Francoist State's censorship only because es:Joan Beneyto, a conservative Valencianist within the state, held a post within the censorship office and allowed the few works published by Torre to pass without much interference.

Lo Rat Penat remained under the state's control, focussing on folkloric activities, connected with Valencian festivals and with religion. At the end of the 1940, it joined forces with a new Valencianist society which included es:Carles Salvador, who ran courses in the Valencian language.

== Post-Francoism regionalism and nationalism ==
When the Francoist State came to an end in the mid-1970s, the only Valencianist discourse that had persisted and spread was that of regionalism. Thus, most Valencians saw their identity represented in regionalist form; this did not mean acceptance of Francoist political values, as evidenced by the victory of the left in the first democratic elections in what was then known as the Valencian country (País Valenciano). During the period of transition to democracy the Valencian left was influenced by Valencian nationalist thinking, which, especially in the 1960s, had received a new impulse with contributions such as that of Joan Fuster, who represented a politically charged alternative view of regional identity. The two outlooks confronted each other at a moment in history known as the "Battle of Valencia" (es:Batalla de Valencia). The political struggle of that period between left and right for hegemony in the Valencian Community led the political right to treat the influential pan-Catalanist minority as a major opponent, mainly because pan-Catalanism appeared to be central to the political and cultural thinking of the left in the 1970s, which was then turning towards a Valencianist direction. From then on, the right was able to stigmatize and choke off the politically weak Valencian nationalist tendency, identifying it with pan-Catalanism, at the same time as it was successfully identifying Valencian regionalism with anti-Catalanism. Such was the origin of "Blaverism", a markedly anti-Catalanist form of regionalism, which pursued linguistic separatism of Valencian from the rest of the Catalan language domain.

== Blaverism and the Valencian Union ==
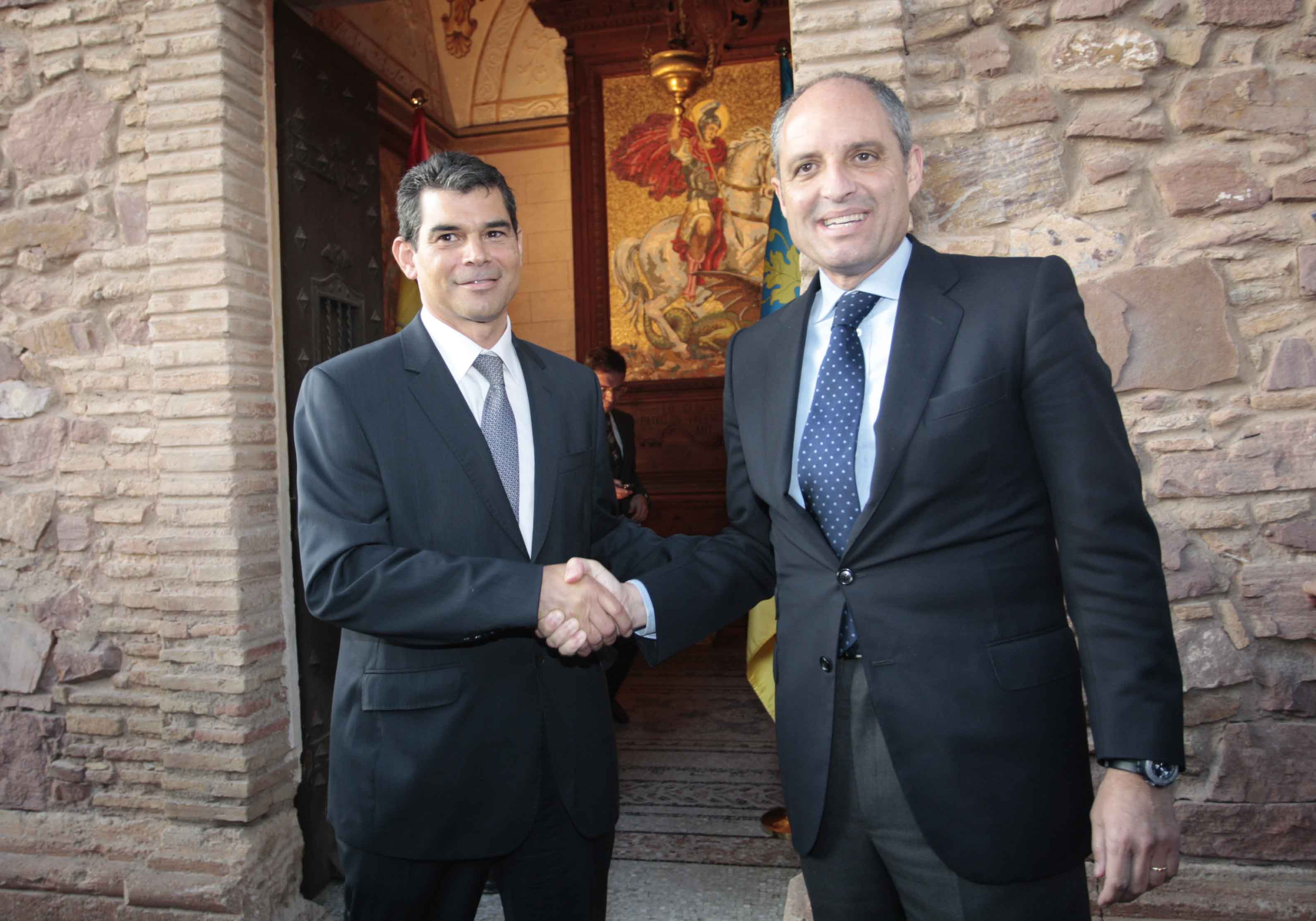
Francisco Camps and es:José Manuel Miralles, at the announcement of the merger of Unió Valenciana with the PPCV, 11 April 2011.

Blaverism (Valencian: blaverisme) is a regionalist political movement that arose at the end of the 1970s as a reaction against Valencian nationalism, more specifically against Joan Fuster's version of it. The term "blaverism", at first derogatory, comes from the blue (Valencian: blava) border of the flag of the Valencian Community, adopted as a symbol by regionalist and right-wing factions who in the end succeeded in having it made the official Valencian flag.

Blaverism was represented in politics mainly by the Valencian Union (Unió Valenciana, Unión Valenciana), a conservative political party established in 1982. With Vicente González Lizondo as its charismatic leader, this anti-Catalanist and regionalist party became the most prominent party whose activities were confined to the Valencian Community during the 1980s and 1990s. It won over 10% of the vote in the regional elections of 1991. Nevertheless, the Valencian Union harboured Valencian nationalist, liberal and even progressive minorities which brought about changes in party policies, especially during the term as party president of es:Hèctor Villalba. During this period the party tried unsuccessfully to differentiate itself from the main Spanish conservative party, the People's Party (PP), which in the Valencian Community was itself adopting the Blaverist regionalist and anti-Catalanist line. In the next regional elections in 1999 the Valencian Union lost all its parliamentary seats, and during the latter half of the 1990s and the whole of the following decade many of its activists were absorbed into the PP. The party as a whole was finally merged into the PP before the regional elections in 2011.

== Sources ==
- Archilés Cardona, Ferran (2013). "La identitat valenciana a l'època contemporània: una perspectiva històrica". In Vicent Flor i Moreno (ed.). Nació i identitats, pensar el País Valencià. Catarroja, Afers. p. 26. ISBN 978-84-92542-80-2. (in Valencian)
- Lluís Oltra Català (2012). Fonaments de la identitat territorial amb especial atenció a la identitat nacional. El cas valencià: discursos polítics sobre la identitat valenciana entre els militants de base del Bloc, EUPV i PSPV-PSOE. Doctoral thesis, University of Alicante.
