= Salvador Minguijón Adrián =

Spanish law scholar, political theorist and politician (1874–1959)

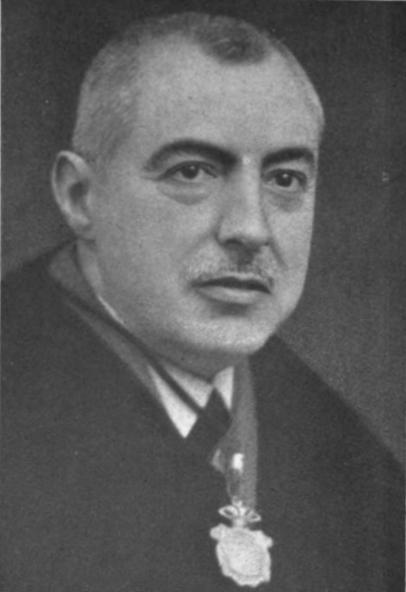
- Born: Juan Salvador Minguijón Adrián; 1874; Calatayud
- Died: 1959 (aged 84–85); Zaragoza
- Occupation: academic
- Known for: academic, theorist
- Political party: Carlism, Partido Social Popular

Salvador Minguijón Adrián (1874–1959) was a Spanish law scholar, political theorist and politician. As a lawyer he is known mostly as a longtime academic in the University of Zaragoza and briefly member of the Spanish constitutional court. As a theorist he is considered one of key representatives of Traditionalism. As a politician he is recognized as associated with Carlism, Christian Democracy, Primoderiverismo, Social Catholicism and early Francoism.

== Family and youth ==
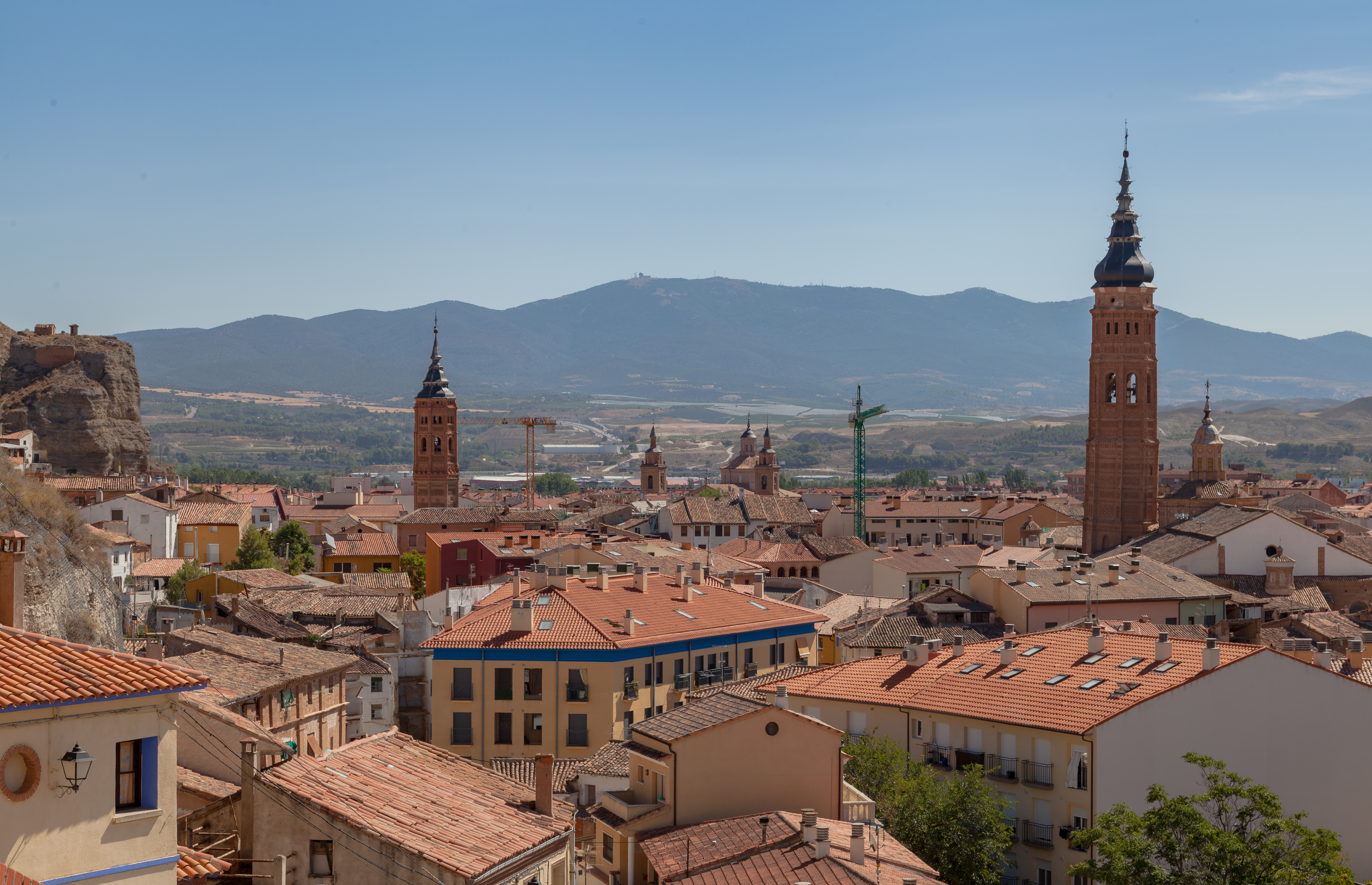
Calatayud

Juan Salvador Minguijón Adrián was descendant to an Aragonese family of petty officials and artisans. His paternal ancestors originated from the village of Terrer in South-Western Aragon, where Salvador's grandfather worked as a primary school teacher; his son and Salvador's father, Jorge Minguijón Cacho (died 1895), was a local administrative clerk. At unspecified date he married María Antonia Adrián Martínez, herself from the nearby Calatayud. Her family originated from Visiedo in another Aragonese province of Teruel; Salvador's maternal grandfather worked as a carpenter. The couple had at least two sons, though exact number of their children is not clear.

Salvador and his brother were raised in a profoundly religious ambience; his father was a local Catholic activist and his brother was to become a friar. Following his childhood spent in Calatayud, the young Salvador entered a diocesan seminary in Zaragoza, a path typically leading to a career of a priest or a school teacher. Having completed the schooling at unspecified time he enrolled at Universidad de Zaragoza, commencing learning at the faculty of Filosofía y Letras, where he completed the curriculum and graduated in 1896. He then moved to Madrid to pursue studies in law at Universidad Central; having been awarded a Cum Laude diploma in 1900, Minguijón continued with doctoral research.

In 1903 Minguijón commenced the career of a lawyer becoming a notary in Sabiñán, a municipality in the comarca of Calatayud. In 1905 he switched to the same role in Brea, a slightly larger location in the comarca of Aranda, where he probably practiced very shortly as he soon commenced academic duties in Zaragoza. In 1906 Minguijón obtained PhD laurels in Madrid; his thesis, titled La responsabilidad civil extracontractual, was considered excellent by the jury.

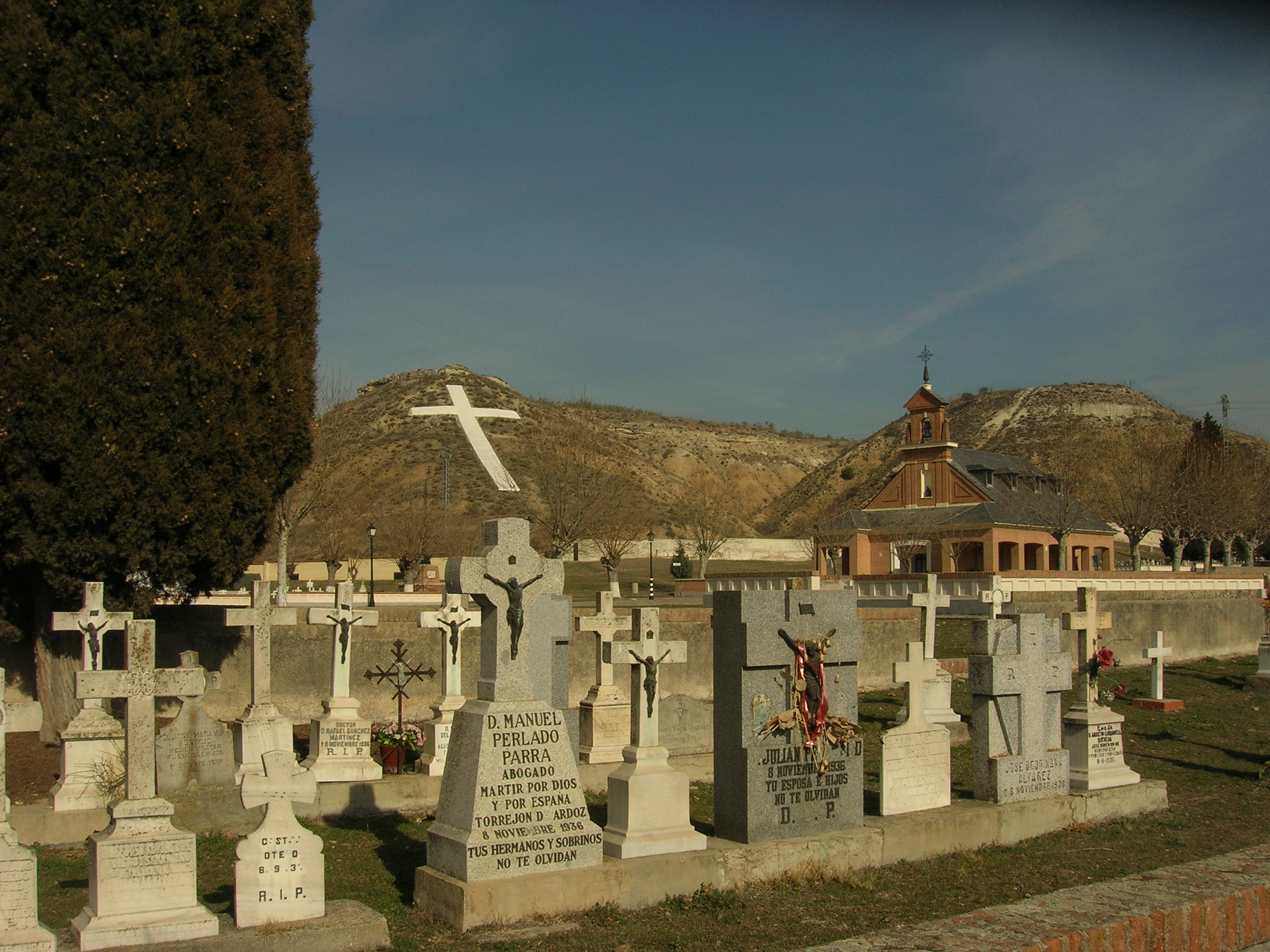
Paracuellos de Jarama cemetery

At unspecified time Salvador Minguijón married Ana-María Paraíso Ferruz; none of the sources consulted provides any information on his wife. The couple had four children: Carmen, Agustín, María Luisa and María Antonia. The family lived in Zaragoza, though in the mid-1930s they moved to Madrid. Minguijón spent his declining years alone: his brother died in 1917, his wife widowed him middle-aged in 1935, one daughter became a Discalced Carmelitan nun and has never left the monastery, the only son, a leading activist of Asociación Católica Nacional de Propagandistas, was executed by the Republicans in Paracuellos de Jarama in 1936, while another daughter died in the mid-1940s. Minguijón died in Zaragoza, en route to his usual summer holiday location in Irún.

== Jurist: academic and official ==
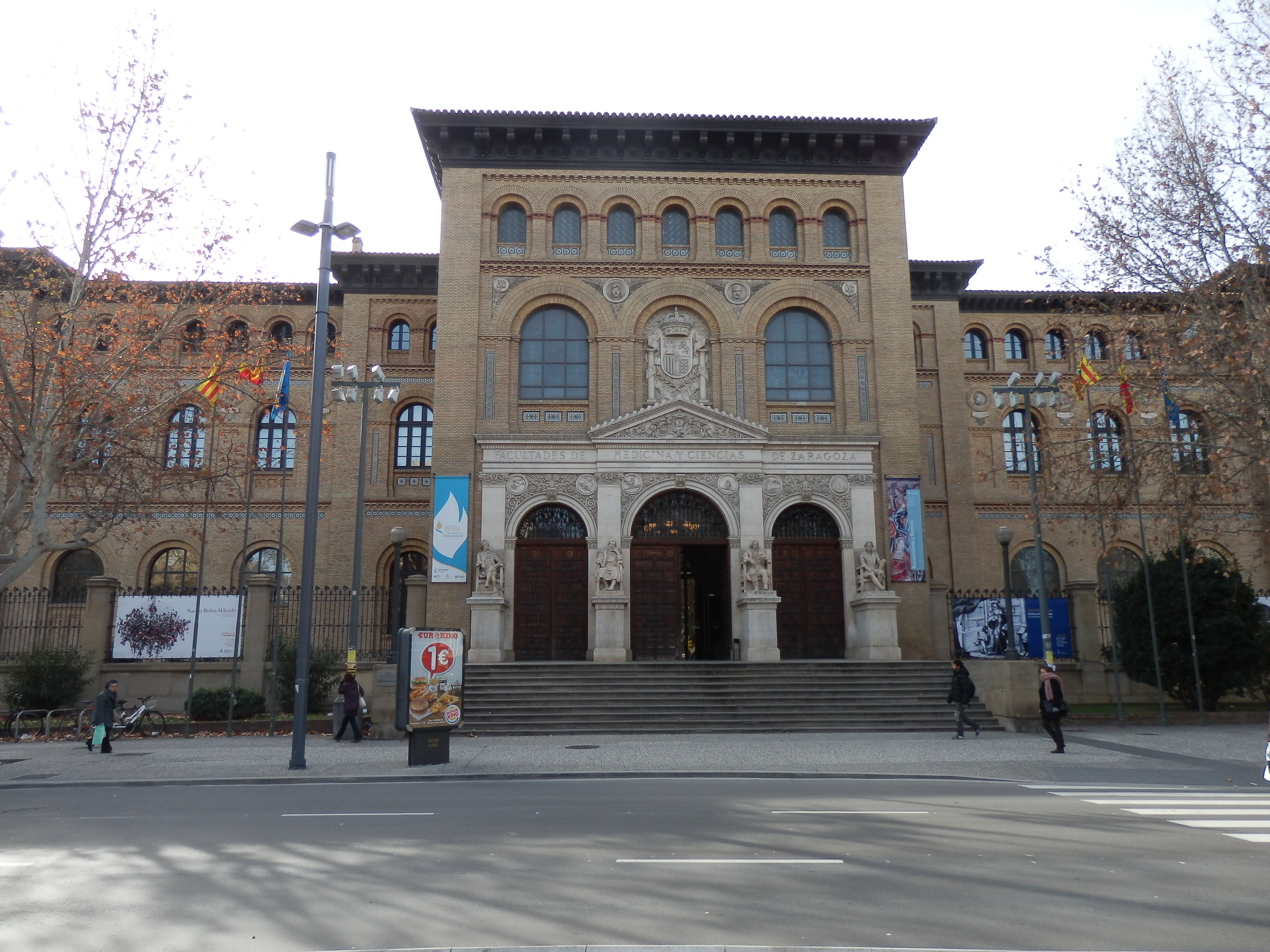
Zaragoza University

In 1904–1905 Minguijón applied to a number of secondary education institutions in Zaragoza, but his bids for chairs of geography, history, letters, Latin and law proved unsuccessful. In 1905 he was accepted at temporary unpaid job of professor auxiliar at Facultad de Derecho of the University of Zaragoza; the same year he defeated five counter-candidates and won the contest for professor auxiliar interino retribuido del segundo grupo, assuming regular teaching duties in 1906. In 1907 he was promoted to professor auxiliar numerario de segundo grupo. The same year he filled the vacancy in Historia General del Derecho Español as assistant professor. In 1910 he applied for Historia General del Derecho in Universidad de Valladolid, but it is not clear whether he took part in the usual contest for the job. In 1911 he emerged victorious from the contest for chair of Historia General del Derecho in Zaragoza, thus terminating the period of junior assignments and assuming a major academic position.

Minguijón served as head of history of law in Zaragoza for close to the following quarter of a century, his position in the national realm of jurisprudence scholars enhanced following the publication of a series of textbooks in the 1910s, and especially his major work, Historia del Derecho Español, issued in 1927. From the mid-1910s he was invited to be a jury member in contests for academic chairs, held across Spain. In the early 1930s he was already a distinguished law academic, known beyond the scientific milieu thanks to his numerous press contributions. Minguijón's juridical career was crowned in 1933, when he was elected as an academic nominee to Tribunal de Garantías Constitucionales, the Spanish constitutional court. The year marked also his departure from Zaragoza; he had to abandon the university chair as the new job required his presence in Madrid.

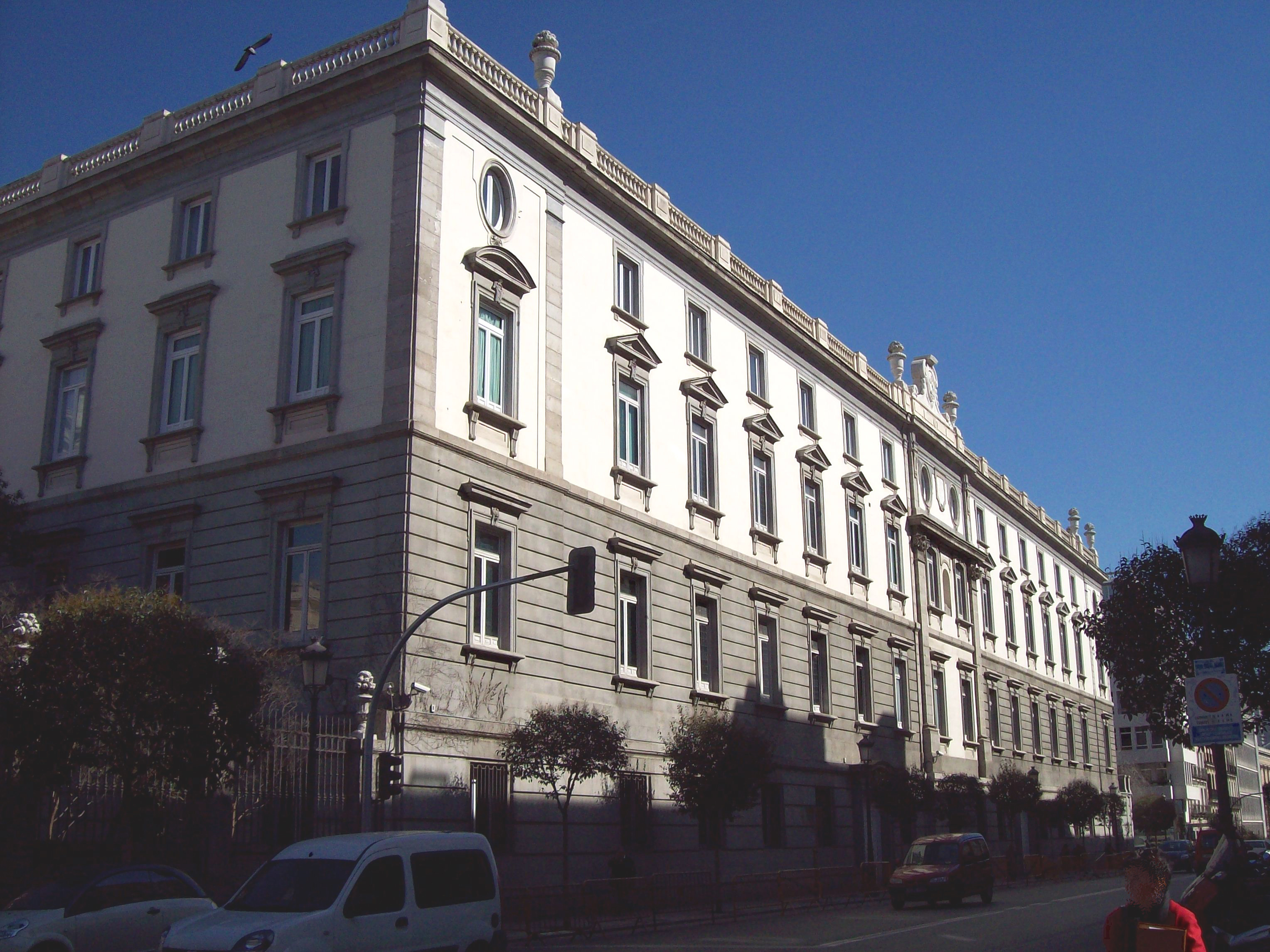
site of Tribunal Supremo

Minguijón formally resigned from the anyway defunct Tribunal in September 1936; he returned to Zaragoza and resumed his university duties until in 1938 he was appointed to the new Francoist high court, Tribunal Supremo. Back in Madrid, in the early 1940s he chaired historia del derecho and sociología at Universidad Central. In 1940 he entered the very elite of Spanish academics, becoming a member of the Real Academia de Ciencias Morales y Políticas. Minguijón resigned from all academic and official duties upon reaching the regular retirement age in 1944. Already in the 1930s he used to collaborate with semi-scholarly institutions, notably giving lectures at Ateneo de Madrid. This activity gained momentum following his retirement, especially as he became vice-president of the 1943-established Instituto Balmes de Sociología. Already in the early 1940s he engaged in works of Institución Fernando el Católico of Zaragoza. In 1944 he became one of the moving spirits behind the Madrid Colegio de Aragón, set up by IFC as means of sustaining an Aragon identity, scaling down his engagement after 1953.

== Writings ==
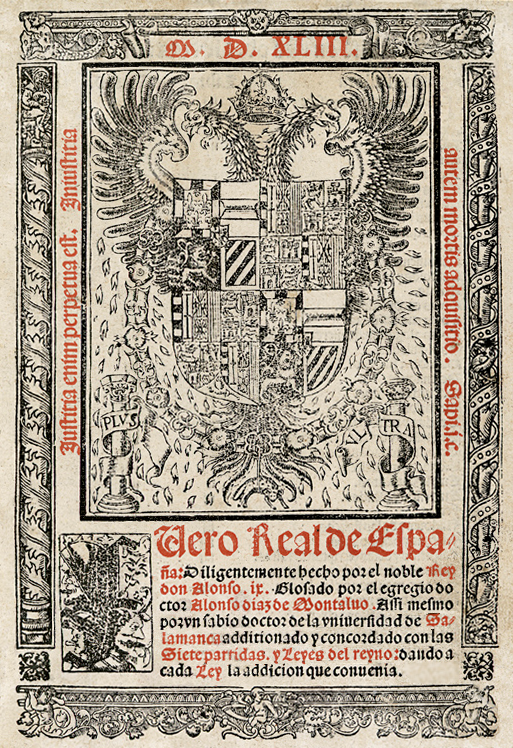
Fuero Real, 1543 (1255)

Minguijón's written heritage is one major work, around 20 booklets, tens of scientific articles and hundreds of press items. In terms of topics, his opus is described by a present-day-scholar as multi-faceted. It may be roughly divided into four groups: jurisprudence, political thought, social sciences and ongoing public issues.

His most recognized works are those dealing with history of law. From 1911 to the early 1920s Minguijón published booklets formatted as textbooks for students, completed as a 12-volume series titled Elementos de historia del derecho español; apart from the synthesis and update of earlier works they were heavily based on own research, related in particular to medieval and foral Spanish legislation. The series was the basis for a massive monograph, Historia del derecho español (1927), the 500-page work which gained Minguijón his name and scientific posture. Re-issued in several editions, until the mid-1950s it served as an academic manual for generations of Spanish students.

Minguijón's works on political thought were formatted mostly as pamphlets and booklets hardly exceeding 100 pages. The best known one, having been also chronologically the first, was La crisis del tradicionalismo en España (1914), a lecture of the author's understanding of Traditionalism and its role in Spain of the era; it elevated the author to a prominent though controversial position within Carlism. It was followed by Humanismo y nacionalidad (1929), Al servicio de la Tradición (1930), La crisis de la libertad (1934), La Democracia (1934) and Los apologistas del siglo II (1936), all of them marking an attempt to transform Traditionalist outlook into a modern Christian doctrine.

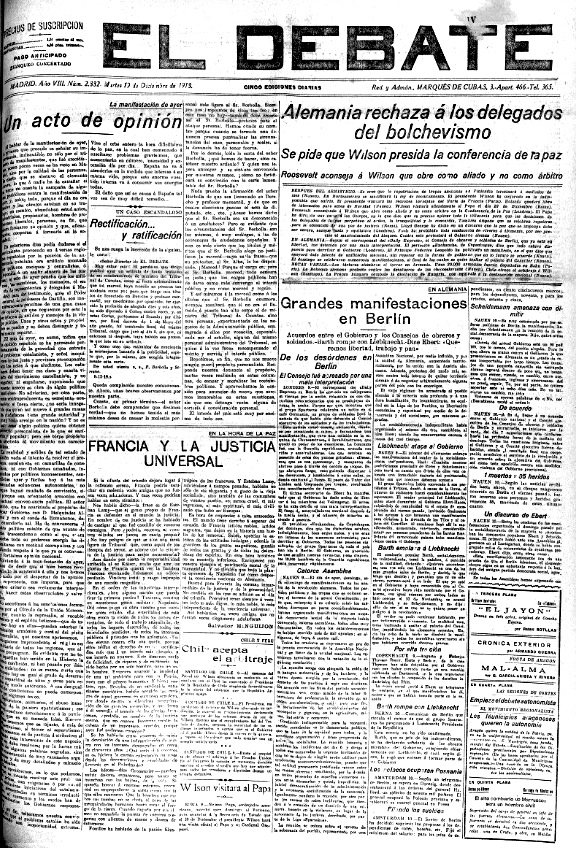
El Debate, 1918

Minguijón's interest in social issues gradually developed into a hybrid in-between the science of sociology and theories of addressing social problems. It was first demonstrated in Las luchas del periodismo (1908), a discussion of social obligations of the press, followed by Hombres e ideas. Estudios sociales (1910), Propiedad y trabajo (1920), La función social de la propiedad (1930) and La Propiedad (1935) and combined with numerous articles in specialized reviews. Some works fall rather into philosophy, as Minguijón strove to present a general background of Christian thought; they are either a handful of minor works published for a limited audience or translations from German.

A numerically dominant group of Minguijón's writings are his press contributions, usually some 800-word commentaries dealing with ongoing public affairs. Far from partisan zeal and styled as impartial essays, within a wide public discourse they gained Minguijón recognition as a pundit. Starting in the early 1910s, he began to contribute to Catholic dailies across the country. However, he was particularly active writing to El Debate and emerged as a key commentator of the Madrid daily. As during the Republic years El Debate became a semi-official CEDA mouthpiece; Minguijón, at that time member of the supreme national court, preferred to publish rather in various regional Catholic periodicals. During the Civil War and afterwards he did not resume his career as a press pundit.

== Carlist: minimismo ==
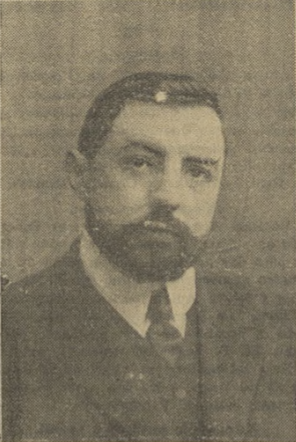
Salvador Minguijón (1911)

The political preferences of Minguijón's father are not entirely clear, though he is known to have at least sympathized with Carlism. A "Salvador Minguijón" from Calatayud was noted as signing a loyalist Carlist address in 1886, but for the first time he can be surely identified assuming public activity in 1897, taking part in local ecclesiastical educational initiatives. He followed an apparent periodista zeal: in 1908 he took part in a Catholic Asamblea Nacional de Buena Prensa, while in the 1910s co-founded and periodically managed socially minded Catholic periodicals, La paz social, El Noticiero and El Pilar. His Carlist leaning was reinforced at the university; in the early 20th century the Zaragoza Law Faculty was dominated by Jaimistas from the Comín dynasty. However, he was not noted as active within the Carlist realm until publication of La crisis del tradicionalismo en España in 1914.

La crisis claimed that Traditionalist dogma was perfectly valid, though it had to be renewed and its application re-defined; Minguijón viewed it not as a fixed set of principles, but as an adaptive approach to problems of human civilization. The practical conclusion was that the Carlists should seek alliance with all political forces sharing the same lowest common denominator. He advocated rapprochement with the Integrists, with Lliga Regionalista and with the Mauristas. Indeed, some claim that he subscribed to a modelo maurrasiano, a new counter-revolutionary movement exploring parliamentary opportunities to build a confessional, corporative and regional state; others underline inspiration by the concept of Catholic unity, launched by ACNDP and pursued by its freshly set-up daily, El Debate. The alliance implied that the Carlists should soften their approach to Catalanism, up to recognition of separate Catalan legislation and administration, and park their dynastical claims. Some scholars consider Minguijón's strategy a reference to Sexenio Democrático, when Carlism served as agglutinatory factor for conservative forces; it was supposed to lay path for peaceful transformation of liberal monarchy into a traditionalist one. The strategy presented was dubbed minimismo or minimismo tradicionalista.

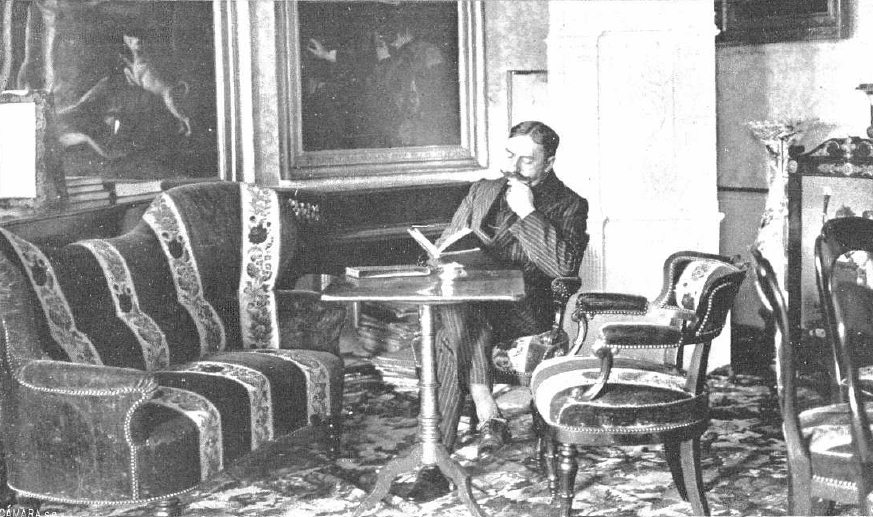
Don Jaime, 1910s

Within Carlism Minguijón's proposal was appreciated as an elaborate and genuine attempt to revitalize the movement, though critics pointed out that it would be another version of Pidalismo, an opportunist amalgamation of Traditionalism within a broad conservative spectrum. They lambasted it as reducción grave y transcendental de las bases más esenciales de nuestra Comunión("a serious and transcendental reduction of the most essential foundations of our Communion") and an amputation of Carlism. Skeptics offered a competitive diagnosis, namely that the crisis of Carlism was caused by the deadly virus of parliamentarism. Following a period of hesitation, in 1915 Minimismo was eventually disavowed by the claimant Don Jaime, who confirmed intransigence on dynastical issues and permitted at best a neutral approach towards the moderate Catalanism of La Lliga.

== Mellismo and Partido Social Popular ==
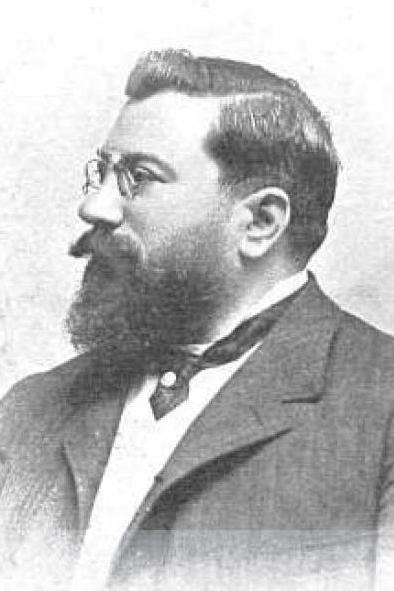
Juan Vázquez de Mella

In the 1910s Carlism was dominated by a conflict between the claimant and the key party theorist, Juan Vázquez de Mella. At first glance Minimismo and Mellismo seemed alike: both favored parking dynastical issues and forging a grand, Traditionalism-centred right-wing alliance. However, scholars differ when discussing the mutual position of the two concepts. Some name Minguijón a key protagonist of sector promellista, highlighting their shared penchant for a conservative bloc; others note rather that Minguijón followed de Mella by firmly incorporating the social dimension into the doctrine. Some students, however, suggest that Minguijón opposed catastrofismo mellista by working towards a constructive solution. They highlight that Minguijón seemed inclined towards politics within the Alfonsist framework, while de Mella adopted a decisively anti-system stance with no dynastical commitments. One more difference was that unlike a fiercely Germanophile de Mella, during the Great War Minguijón adopted a pro-Entente stand and even considered setting up a pro-French daily.

When the crisis climaxed in 1919 and the Mellistas broke away to build their own grouping, Minguijón maintained loyalty to Don Jaime. According to some sources he remained influential enough to enforce – together with Francisco Melgar – resignation of Pascual Comín y Moya from the temporary Carlist leadership. However, his days in the movement were already numbered. Together with a group of socially-minded Zaragoza scholars he had been co-operating with for more than a decade, especially Severino Aznar and Inocencio Jiménez, in 1919 he co-founded Grupo de Democracía Cristiana, an organization under the auspices of cardinal Guiasola. Though technically it did not constitute a breach of loyalty towards the Carlist king, Minguijón concluded that Carlism was no longer offering a viable solution. He confirmed his commitment to Traditionalist values, but in terms of political strategy he perceived Carlism as a dead-end: Don Jaime was deprived of descendants and acting as a party leader rather than as a king, while the movement trapped in dynastical intransigence was deprived of any allies. Determined to seek broad partnership on a minimalist basis, Minguijón left Jaimismo in 1920.

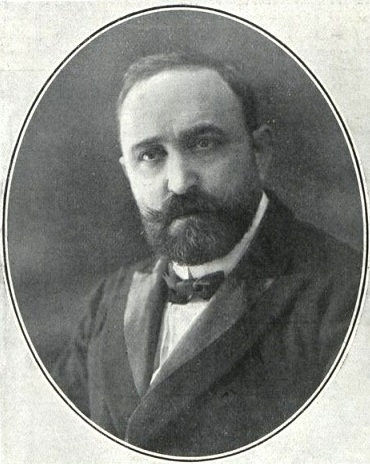
Severino Aznar

In 1922 Minguijón co-issued a manifesto launching Partido Social Popular; he was among the Zaragoza socially-minded theorists, one of six streams which merged in the new organization. The party, inspired by social encyclical of Leo XIII, is considered the first Spanish incarnation of Christian Democracy; Minguijón co-authored its Programa mínimo and enthusiastically advocated its broad platform as allegedly deprived of sectarian particularism; the party focus was on social issues tackled within a broad Catholic perspective. In PSP Minguijón remained one of the key theorists, though the party was by no means short of them, having in its ranks also Severino Aznar, Manuel Simó Marín, Inocencio Jiménez, Rafael Aizpún, José Ibáñez Martín, José María Gil-Robles, Ángel Ossorio y Gallardo and Víctor Pradera. The organization, intended as an agglutinatory force beyond a future broad right-wing platform, proved to have been just en episode; like all other political parties it was dissolved by the Primo de Rivera dictatorship in 1923.

== Dictatorship ==
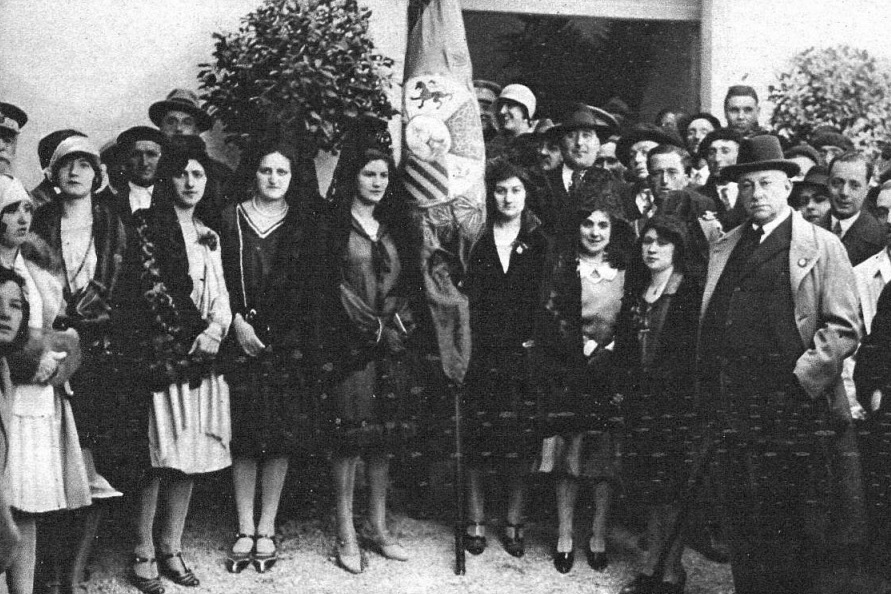
Primo with the Aragon Somatén

Shortly after the March on Rome Minguijón defined Fascism as a sane response to social disunity and administrative chaos, the problems haunting Spain as well; though he refrained from endorsing violence and dictatorship, Minguijón noted that also in his country "tenemos necesidad de depuración y de disciplina" ("We need purification and discipline"). Upon the advent of the Primo de Rivera dictatorship two months later he greeted the developments with cautious optimism; by the end of 1923 the pesepistas voiced their support for renewal and reconstitución of political setting. Underlining no support for violence, they hoped for increased social work, making vague references to agrarian reform, syndical liberties, cheap credit, municipal self-government and advanced labor legislation.

Many former PSP members, most notably Víctor Pradera, emerged as key theorists behind the primoderiverista regime; however, Minguijón was not visible in the front row of its supporters. He focused mostly on quasi-political work adhering to the Christian-Democratic format, at that time championed mostly by Asociación Católica Nacional de Propagandistas. In 1923–1926 he engaged in Círculo de Estudios, a think-tank born out of ACNDP, giving lectures on social and political issues as well as publishing articles in specialized reviews. Many of them focused on his favorite topic, the question of property, advancing a thesis that increasing ownership among wide social strata was the best strategy for confronting both poverty and revolution. In 1926 he engaged in building Organización Corporativa Nacional, the nationwide labor organization, by scholars counted among the representatives of tradicionalismo mellista.

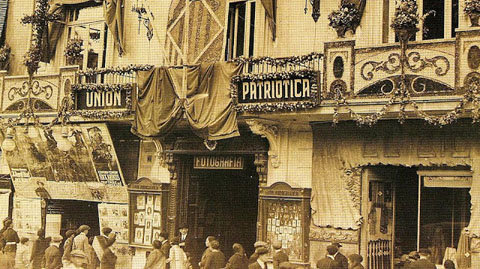
Unión Patriótica HQ (Valencia)

In the late 1920s Minguijón was active discussing structure and composition of the new state diet. Acknowledging that the freshly formed Asamblea Consultiva was merely a stepping stone towards the ultimate Asamblea Nacional, he fully agreed with its corporative format, in line with the theory of organic democracy. Engaging in polemics with other theorists like Ossorio y Gallardo, he discussed rather components of the parliament, advocating a slightly larger granularity of its structure. He himself did not emerge as a major Unión Patriótica official and was not appointed to the quasi-parliament; it is not clear whether, except relations with Pradera, he had access to Primo or any of the key decision-makers of the regime. The tone of Minguijón's editorials, though never enthusiastic, cooled down over time; those from the late 1920s and 1930 are increasingly escapist. They discuss foreign policy, history, ideas, law, great personalities etc., but tend to evade current issues. They remain firm, however, in support of Catholic trade unions and Catholic social thought, as well as in opposition to violence.

== Republic ==
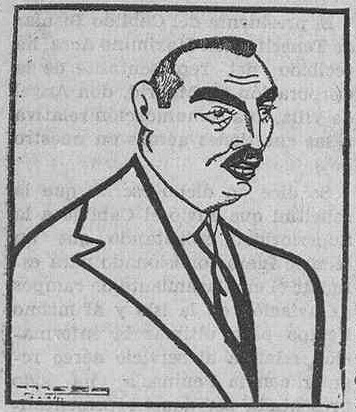
Minguijon in press cartoon, Republic years

Upon the advent of the Second Spanish Republic, Minguijón did not join any political party and adopted the position of an observer. In the spring of 1931 his press commentaries maintained an abstract, Aesopian language. In the months and years to come Minguijón assumed a more specific stance; though he declared himself a monarchist (with an increasingly Alfonsist penchant), at the same time he advocated constructive work under the republican regime. His focus was invariably on social issues and the question of property. Lambasting elitism and the liberal outlook he called for the common good to take precedence over the individual good and formulated his expectations in likewise spirit; in practical terms, they centred on agrarian reform and tackling unemployment. All the above stemmed from Catholic and not socialist principles; Minguijón firmly voiced against divorce and called for a civilization based on a rural, traditional basis, though he did not declare himself alarmed by the separation of state and church.

Though in favor of common spirit, Minguijón opposed a dictatorship of the majority and acknowledged the anti-democratic tide overwhelming Europe as a "crisis of liberty"; he compared Fascist, Nazi and Soviet regimes using the word totalitario, though he also distinguished between them. Denying Fascist identity, he admitted the superiority of the Italian system – respectful to religious and secular tradition – compared to the Soviet one, praising also Piłsudski for stopping bolshevism in 1920 and Hitler for preventing a Bolshevik revolution in 1933. Minguijón denounced the Spanish revolutionary Left as inventing a Fascist menace but offering the same totalitarian solution; his own preference was for the Salazar regime.

In 1933 Minguijón co-founded a Zaragoza-based Centro de Estudios Sociales, born out of ACNDP and formatted as an Aragon version of the Madrid-based Instituto Social Obrero; he published in periodicals issued by both think-tanks. He remained active in the Christian-Democratic realm, taking part in various international congresses. Politically he drew closer to CEDA; it was thanks to its votes, combined with support from other right-wing groupings, that in October 1933 Minguijón was elected – according to some authors as tradicionalista – to Tribunal de Garantías Constitucionales, a 35-member body acting as the Republic's constitutional court.

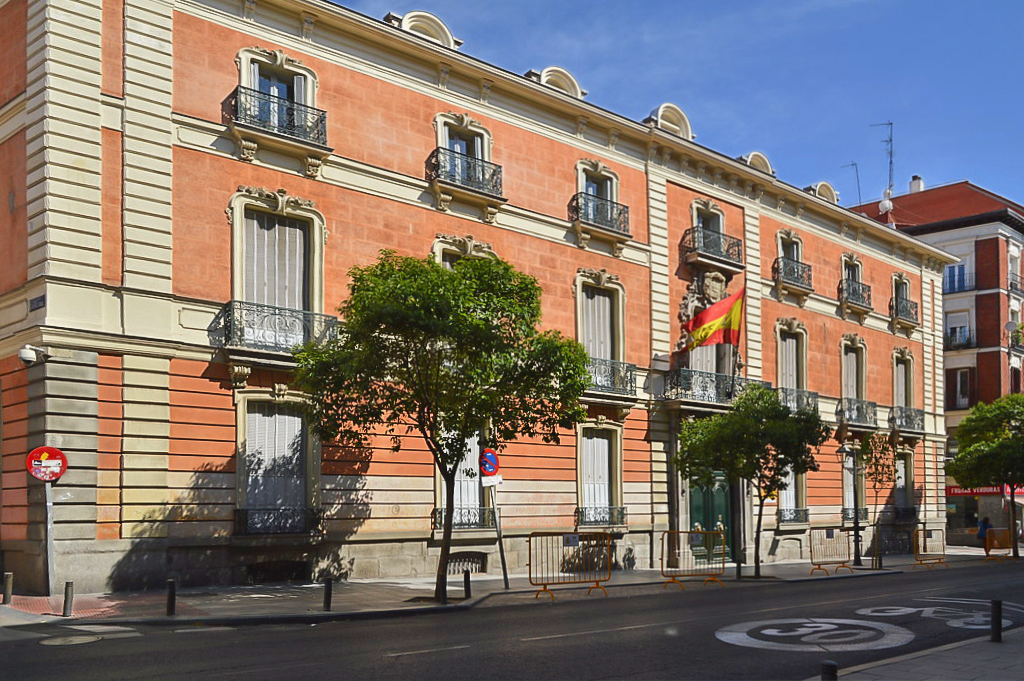
Tribunal de Garantías Constitucionales site (present view)

Gaining seat in the Tribunal suspended Minguijón's university career, enforced his transfer from Zaragoza to Madrid and reduced his activity as a press pundit, though he continued sending commentaries to various periodicals. As constitutional judge Minguijón found himself in an awkward position; the body was entrusted with safeguarding the juridical republican system, while at the same time he was growing increasingly disillusioned with the legal order of the Republic. His struggle was reflected in a highly contested vote on the Catalan Leases Act, known as Llei de Contractes de Conreu. The verdict was possibly the key pronouncement of the Tribunal during Minguijón's tenure and pertained to two issues: Catalan autonomy and the social question, the latter related to vineyard tenants’ status. The Tribunal, at that time dominated by conservatively minded judges, decided against the claims of the Catalans and the tenants; Minguijón did not share that opinion and recorded a votum separatum.

== Civil War ==
Carlist standard

The July 1936 coup caught Minguijón during a summer break in Zaragoza. The city was almost immediately captured by the Nationalists and most University professors did not hesitate to voice their enthusiastic support for the rebels. Minguijón is not listed either among the most active advocates of the cause or among those engineering purges at the university, though at some point he declared his backing. In September he formally resigned from the anyway defunct Tribunal and resumed teaching at his usual History of Law chair in University of Zaragoza, the role performed for two years until in November 1938 he was nominated to a newly established Nationalist high court, Tribunal Supremo. Having abandoned Aragón – this time for good – he resumed his role as highest judge and formally contributed to the forging of the Francoist system; until 1950 the Tribunal consisted of appointees deemed utterly loyal and entrusted with juridical institutionalization of the regime.

According to a contemporary scholar, during the Civil War Minguijón was also vital to the forging of the emerging Nationalist ideology. His part involved contributions to Noticiero de España, a Burgos-based bulletin issued by Servicios de Prensa y Propaganda and created to disseminate official ideas of the emerging state; within its editorial board he formed a group dubbed juristas, considered also representative of "Traditionalists and Church". There were 63 issues of Noticiero published during its most prolific phase; there are nine of Minguijón's articles identified, published between May 1938 and August 1939.

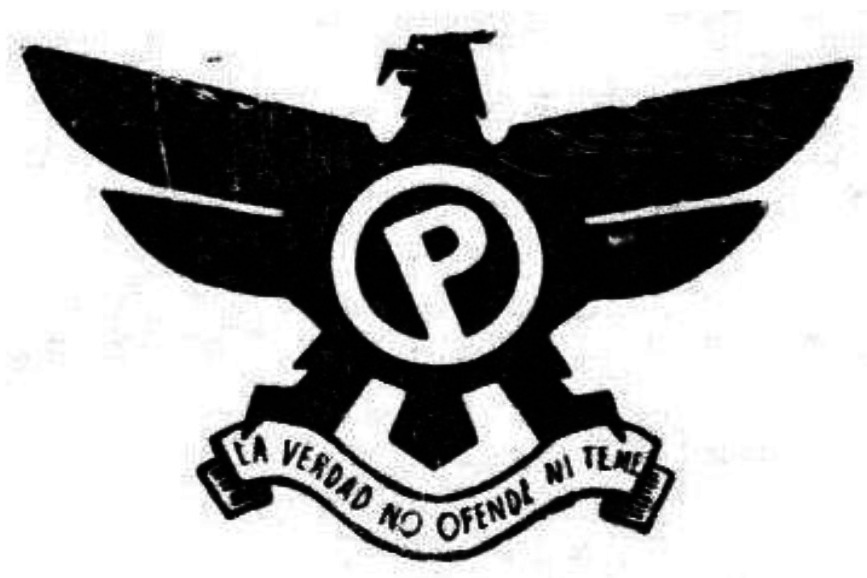
logotype of Noticiero de España

Minguijón's role in Noticiero is described as related mostly to the delegitimization of the Republic. Its regime was portrayed as the climax of bolshevization which commenced in Russia in 1917 but manifested itself in Spain in Jaca in 1930, in Asturias in 1934 and following the victory of Frente Popular in 1936; Minguijón argued that the Republican regime abandoned its own rules, decomposed into anarchy and lost legitimacy; moreover, it turned against democratic principles and the rising of genuine Spain was necessary, also to restore them. He wrote about the Republic with bitterness and visible disappointment, lamenting that the regime was trapped in contradictions: it failed to eradicate the domination of the privileged classes and to introduce reforms based on the will of the people. All these hopes were now laid in the emerging Nationalist state. Minguijón's earlier skepticism about Fascism gave way to cautious endorsement; he dubbed earlier comparisons between Fascism and Communism superficial and in one of his last articles published in Noticiero, dated July 1939, he analyzed where Fascism overlapped with Traditionalism, having found six points that both had in common.

== Francoism ==
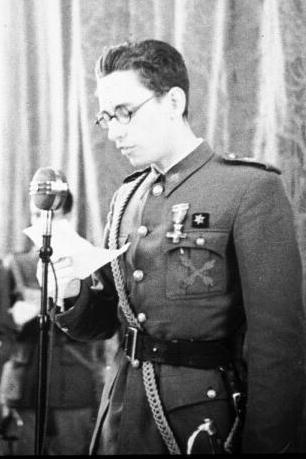
Gambra

Following the Nationalist capture of Madrid, Minguijón settled in the city, where he resumed his academic career in the history of law and at sociology in Universidad Central; his teaching influenced the next generation of Traditionalists like Rafael Gambra, who attended Minguijón's lectures and were to gain prominence in the 1960s. None of the sources consulted provides information on Minguijón's role in Tribunal Supremo; the entire body is known mostly for retroactively reversing many components of the Republican legislation. He did not assume any official posts in state administration; he is neither noted as active in political structures, be it Falangist or otherwise. In 1940 he entered the national executive of Acción Católica (AC), occasionally giving lectures and publishing in AC periodicals.

Having retired from the Tribunal and the university in 1944, he focused on various duties in Real Academia de Ciencias Morales y Políticas, Institución Fernando el Católico, Colegio de Aragón, Consejo Superior de Investigaciones Cientificas and especially in Instituto Balmes de Sociología, created by CSIC as the brainchild of Severino Aznar. Due to his age and health, these activities declined sharply in the early 1950s; his last identified lecture in Real Academia took place in 1951 and his engagement in Instituto Balmes was loose after 1953.

During Francoism Minguijón did not resume his longtime career as a press pundit, limiting himself to scientific and semi-scientific articles in specialized or Catholic reviews. Little is known about his personal views on the developing Francoist system. In the press he was quoted as pursuing his interest in social questions and praising the social institutions of the Nationalist Spain, especially Instituto Nacional de Previsión, for their efficiency, at least compared to the Republican efforts. He admitted a Traditionalist outlook, though he is not recorded as active in any Carlist branch of the time. He was recollected as skeptical – also in private – about both democracy and capitalism, deemed anonymous and amorphous forces which should be confronted by localismo cultural, based on tradition and – inevitably – small property.

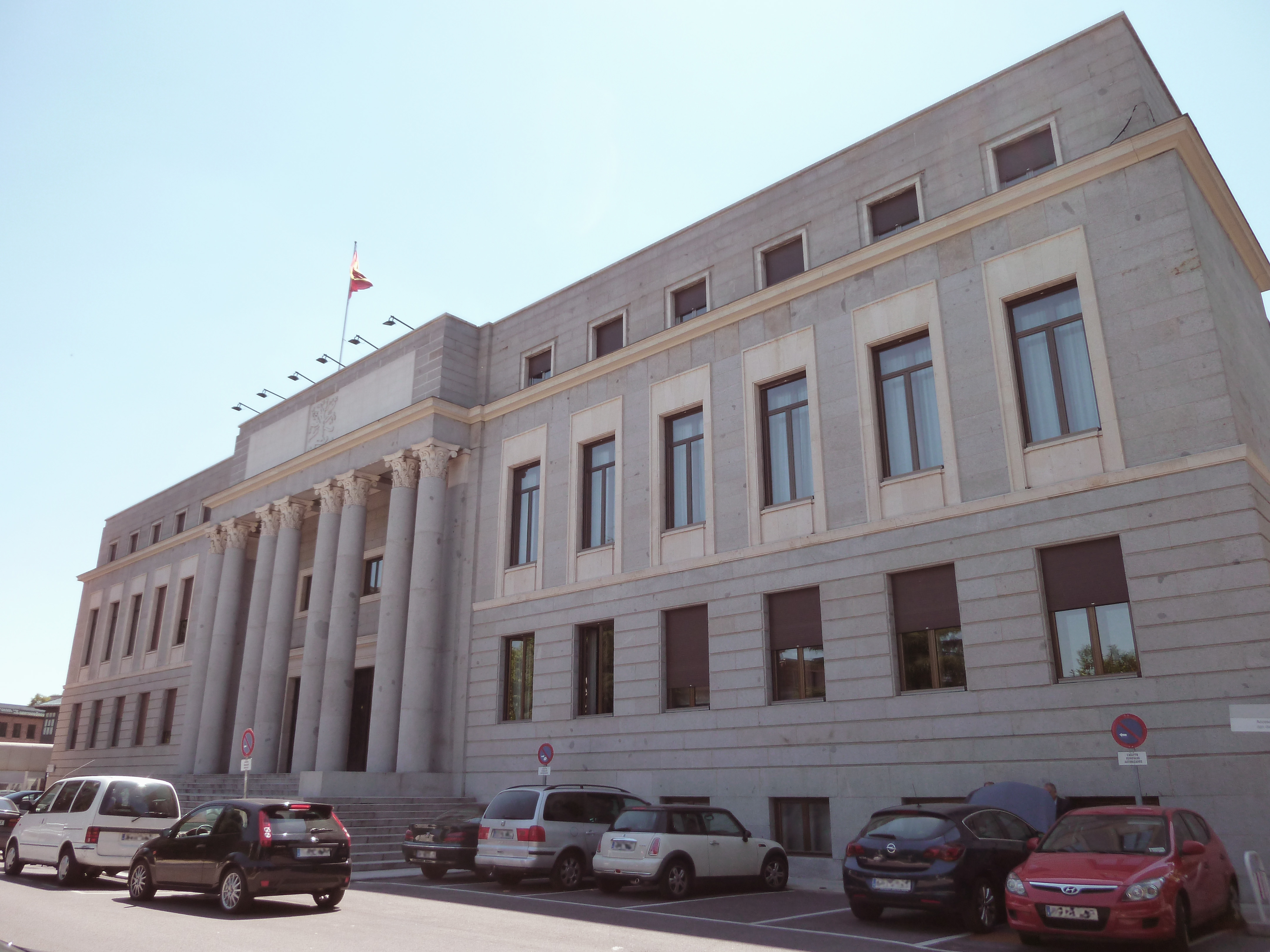
CSIC site (present view)

Shortly before death Minguijón was described as a lonely old man, visited by a handful of disciples and few lifelong friends, like Severino Aznar; on the other hand, he remained perfectly lucid, serene, humble, as usual slightly ironic and far from any emphasis. Waking up around mid-day and working late into the night, he was busy writing a treaty tailored as a popularization of great philosophical concepts; it was supposed to amalgamate them within a new vision, intended for the future. His death was acknowledged by brief notes in some national newspapers; Colegio de Aragón organized a memorial homage session shortly afterwards.

== Reception and legacy ==
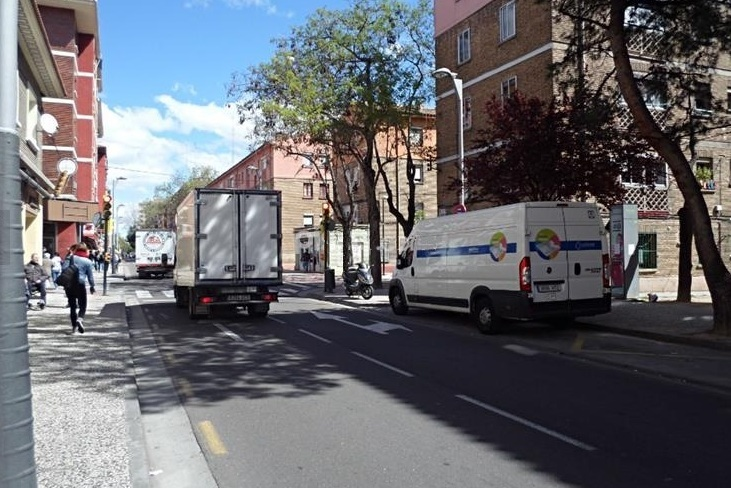
Minguijón Street, Zaragoza

As a conservative theorist who strove to stimulate organization of the working class, Minguijón failed; he is not noted as influencing Carlist syndicates either in their Catholic or pistolerismo format. However, already by the early 1910s Minguijón was noted in wide public discourse as "excelente periodista católico" ("an excellent Catholic journalist") or "ilustre publicista católico"; ("an illustrious catholic publicist") in the 1920s he was acknowledged also as "conocido sociologo" ("a well-known sociologist"). When referred to as a law scholar, apart from the usual "catedrático" he was occasionally hailed as "maestro". In professional realm he gained name following the 1927 publication of Historia del derecho español, in 1933 entering the elite of jurisprudence scholars when nominated to Tribunal de Garantias and finally acquiring the highest status available to an academic when nominated to Real Academia de Ciencias Morales y Políticas in 1940. It remains striking, however, that he was not invited to Real Academia de Jurisprudencia y Legislación.

After Minguijón's death a street in Zaragoza and a college in his native Calatayud were named after him; in both cases the naming survived purges related to anti-Francoist backlash of the late 20th century and implementation of Ley de Memoria Histórica of 2007. None of his works has been re-published and the institutions he co-founded, Instituto Balmes and Colegio de Aragón, ceased to exist as separate units. In public discourse he gradually fell into oblivion; from 1959 to date the popular Madrid daily ABC mentioned him seven times, in all cases briefly noting his name when discussing Christian-Democratic, Traditionalist or social thought; a contemporary scholar declared him a "completely forgotten figure". Currently he is acknowledged only in major general encyclopedias, covered in very brief notes as "historiador del derecho", member of the high Tribunal and "periodista". In specialized almanacs and reference dictionaries he appears as a scholar in philosophy.

Minguijón has earned no monograph so far. In historical literature he is noted mostly as a political theorist, though exact categorization might differ: he could be referred to as one of the first Christian-Democratic politicians and theorists in Spain, as a somewhat unorthodox Carlist who strove to modernize Traditionalism, as a representative of corporativismo católico, democracia orgánica and católicismo social, or as in very recent work, a key contributor to the theoretical vision of emerging Francoism. Some authors straightforwardly declare Minguijón an enemy of democracy, some prefer qualified applications like "democristiano" and some quote him speaking passionately against "democracia individualista y caótica", while declaring that only a corporative system ensured genuine democracy. Few authors recognize him as one of the pioneers of sociology in Spain, a follower of Jaime Balmes.

== See also ==
- Carlism
- Traditionalism (Spain)
- Carlo-francoism
- Corporatism
- Severino Aznar (in Spanish)
