= Manuel Simó Marín =

Spanish right-wing politician

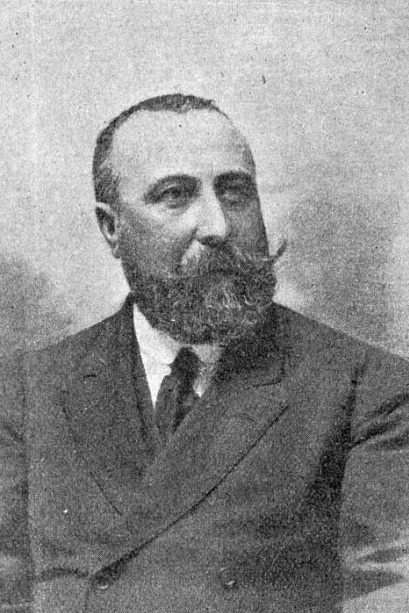
- Born: 1868; Onteniente, Spain
- Died: 1936 (aged 67–68); Valencia
- Occupation: lawyer
- Known for: politician
- Political party: Carlism, PSP, DRV

Manuel Simó Marín (1868-1936) was a Spanish right-wing politician. Until 1919 for some 30 years he remained engaged in Carlism; in 1909-1917 he was heading the regional Valencian branch of the movement and formed part of the national Carlist executive. Following brief attempts to build a Christian-democratic party in the early 1920s, in the 1930s he emerged among leaders of Derecha Regional Valenciana. His political career climaxed in 1914–1916, when during one term he served in Congreso de los Diputados, the lower chamber of the Cortes. During few strings he was also member of the Valencian Diputación Provincial (elected or nominated in 1905, 1921, 1930 and 1934) and the Valencian ayuntamiento (elected in 1899, 1911, and 1931). He is also known as founder of the local daily, Diario de Valencia.

== Family and youth ==
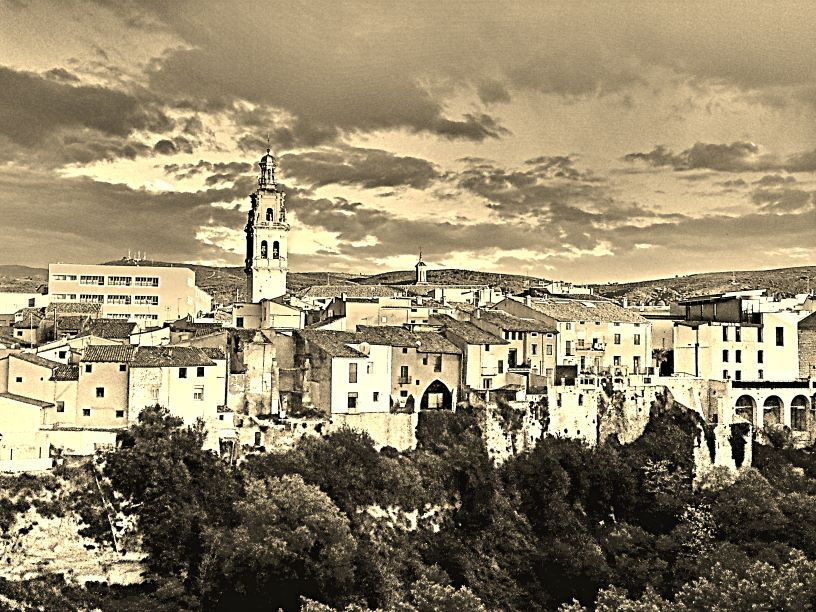
Onteniente

The Simó family has been noted already in the Middle Ages, first recorded in Aragón, Catalonia, at the Levantine coast and the Baleares. Over centuries it got very branched, yet none of the sources consulted provides information on distant Manuel's ancestors. One historian claims that he originated from "a rich family of landholders" traditionally related to the city of Onteniente (Valencia province); its descendant was his father, José Simó Tortosa (died before 1917). He also owned land in the area; in 1860 as "expositor e invitado" he took part in Exposición General de Valencia, organized by Real Sociedad Económica de Amigos del País de Valencia. Apparently a lawyer by education, he became a prestigious local personality; in the late 1860s he acted as "abogado suplente" and "juez de paz" in Onteniente. At unspecified time he married Elisa Marín García Maestre y Osca (died 1925); there is nothing known either of her or of her family. The couple lived in Onteniente and had at least three children: Manuel, José and Carmen.

Following early education in his early teens Manuel entered the Jesuit Colegio de San José, where he was noted in 1884 and where he obtained the baccalaureate. At unspecified time, though probably in the late 1880s, he entered the faculty of law at the University of Valencia; according to some sources he graduated in 1892, though according to the press in 1893 he was still frequenting comparative law lectures. One author claims he graduated also in philosophy and letters, though this information is not confirmed elsewhere. It is not clear when he started to practice and what sort of job he held. In the mid-1890s the press referred to him as "joven abogado" and it is known that he appeared in the local Audiencia Provincial, also in proceedings related to murder.

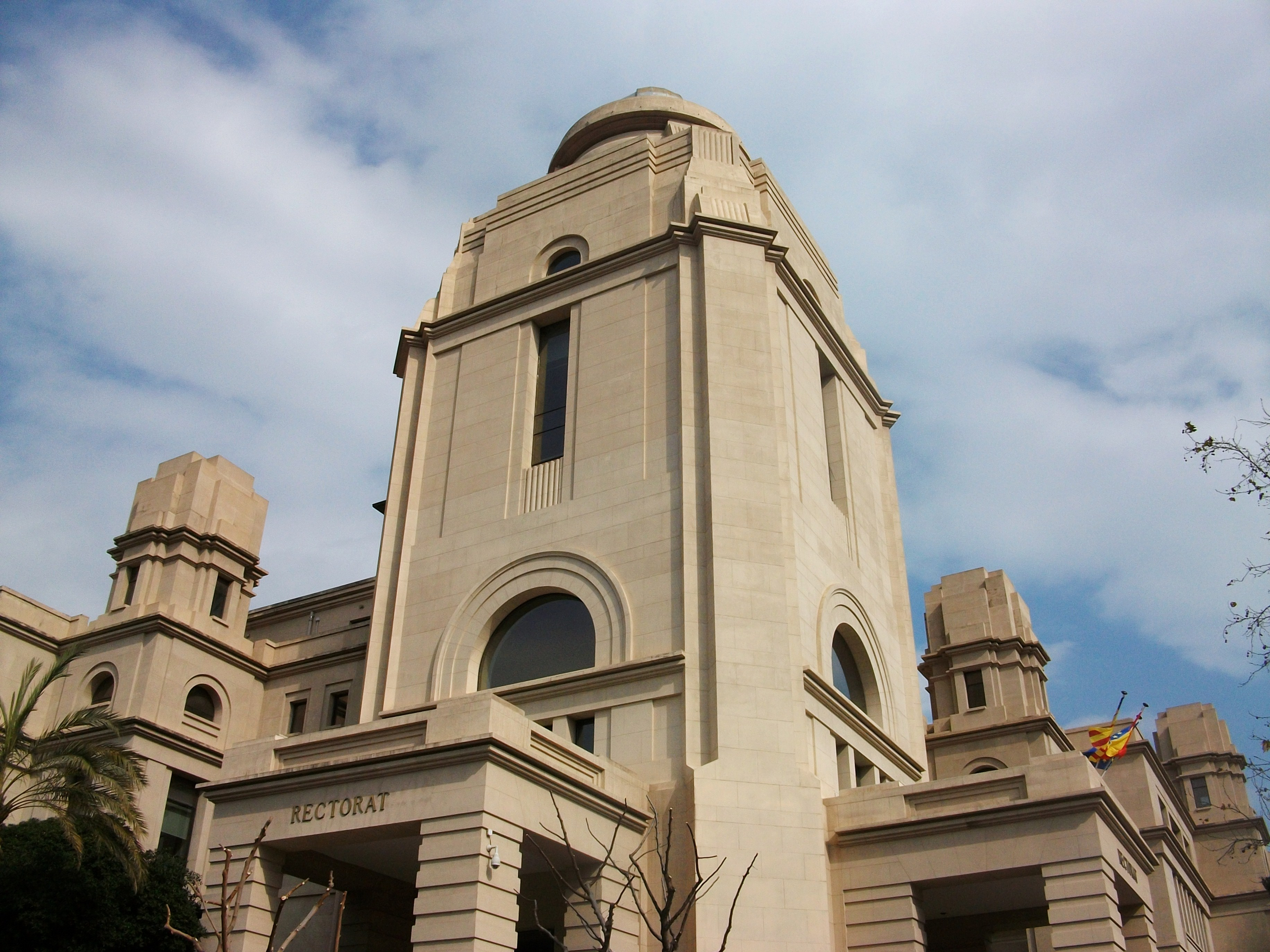
Valencia University at present

At unspecified time Simó Marín married María Attard Serrano (in some spelling versions Atard, died after 1959). She was daughter to a prestigious Valencian lawyer and notary, Manuel Attard Llobell; his brothers and paternal uncles of María, Rafael and Eduardo Attard Llobell, were Levantine conservative deputies to the Cortes in the 1870s, 1880s and 1890s. The couple settled in Valencia. They had 5 children: Manuel, José, Eduardo, Elisa and Concepción. In the 1930s some of them were active in Catholic politics, though none assumed a major role; José and Eduardo were executed by workers' militia during outbreak of the revolutionary terror in 1936. The best known Simó Marín's relative was his younger brother José Simó Marín, also shot in 1936; he co-founded and managed a textile factory which was later owned by the family. As "La Paduana" it became the Onteniente industrial point of reference for almost 100 years. Simó Marín's son-in-law, Manuel Torres Martínez, was a well-known jurist, academic and economist.

== Early Carlist career (1890-1909) ==
Carlist standard

The Simó family have been related to Carlism; Manuel's paternal uncle Faustino Simó Tortosa reportedly served as personal secretary to the claimant Carlos V and was engaged in Carlist structures also much later; this was the case also of another uncle, Manuel Simó Tortosa. Faustino Simó used to employ adolescent nephews as his "ayudantes" when going about his party business. First information on Manuel's public engagements are dated 1890, when he was giving lectures at meetings of Juventud Católica de Valencia. In 1892 he was noted as active in Círculo Carlista in Onteniente and in Valencia; in 1893 he grew to president of Juventud Carlista Valenciana. In 1896 the Carlist provincial executive nominated Simó, at the time a young lawyer, the candidate in elections to Diputación Provincial from the Valencian district of Serranos; he lost. In 1897 he became presidente honorario of the regional Juventud Tradicionalista. In 1899 he ran from the Audiencia district to the Valencian municipal council and emerged successful; he was one of 3 Carlist councilors in the ayuntamiento.

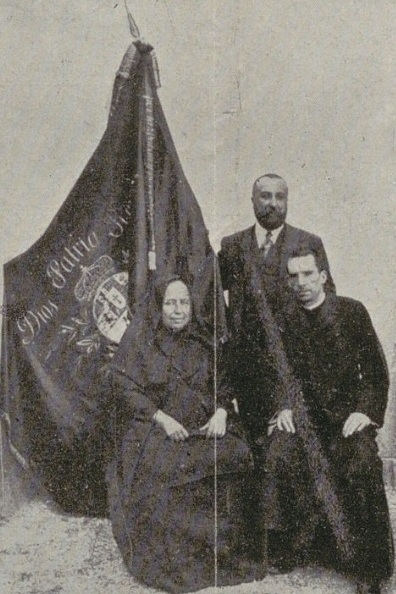
Simó (back) with standard

Simó's position in the local party ranks was already firm; when jefé provincial Manuel Polo y Peyrolón resigned in 1902, Simó briefly replaced him as acting president. He served in the town hall at least until 1903, was active in Catholic organisations and kept progressing his juridical career. In 1905 he renewed his bid for a seat in Diputación Provincial, again from Serranos; this time he emerged as the most-voted candidate in the district. Already the provincial party deputy leader, when in 1907 he was co-launching a new periodical, named El Guerillero, Simó declared that "la táctica del guerrillero sea nuestra norma de conducta. Guerra implacable, sin tregua ni cuartel al liberalismo en todas sus manifestaciones".

There is close to nothing known about Simó's labors as diputado provincial. His term expired in 1908; when trying to renew it the same year, he failed. As treasurer of Consejo de la Casa de los Obreros he demonstrated interest in social question, which would later become his personal mark. Despite earlier friendly co-operation, in the regional party executive his relations with jefé regional Polo y Peyrolon were deteriorating; both him and the Castellón jefé provincial, Joaquín Llorens Fernandez, started to resent Polo for his allegedly adamant leadership style and political intransigence. On the other hand, Polo was critical about Simó's advances towards the Valencian Capitán General Ramón Echagüe, perceived by Simó as an ally against the radical left; to Polo, never oblivious of Echagüe's Alfonsist preferences, these advances went way too far. When in 1909 the Carlist king Carlos VII died, in what he thought a purely procedural gesture Polo handed his resignation to the new claimant, Jaime III. He was shocked to see it accepted; it was Simó nominated the new regional Valencian leader.

== Political climax (1909-1916) ==
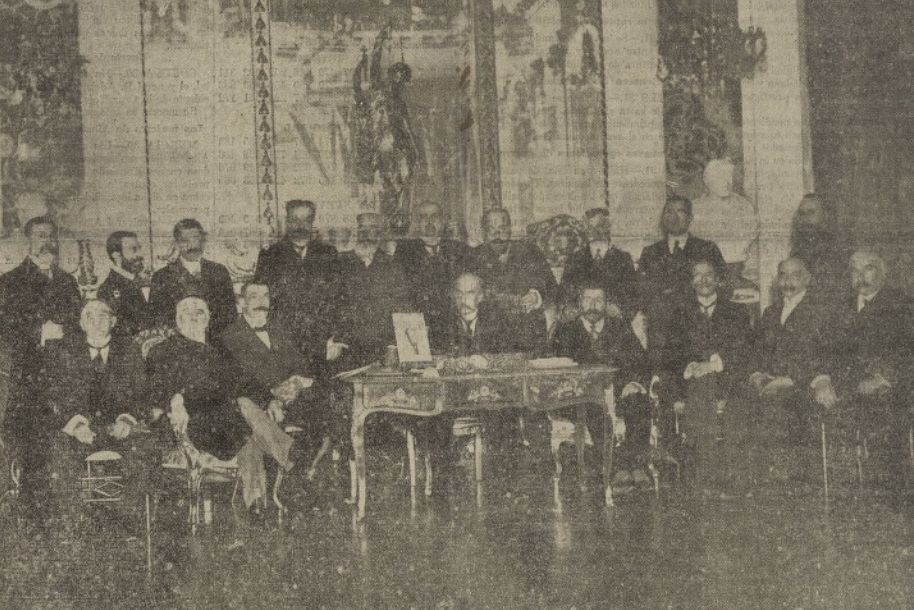
in Junta Nacional Tradicionalista

As the new jefé regional the 41-year-old embarked on traditional duties; he gave lectures at party meetings (e.g. in 1910 against secular schools) or opened new branches (e.g. in 1911 taking part in consecration of a standard), at times appearing also beyond the region, e.g. in Catalonia. He supervised local personal appointments. His most lasting initiative, however, was the 1911 launch of Diario de Valencia, a daily which would appear during the following 25 years. A present-day scholar describes it as "periódico carlista, pero confeccionado con criterios no meramente doctrinales y con pretensión informativa"; others note that as it relegated dynastic issues to secondary position, to many Carlists the daily was merely a "papelucho liberal". Simó briefly managed the daily himself, later to cede management first to Juan Martín Mengod and then to Luis Lucía Lucía.

In 1910 Simó was rumored to run in the Cortes elections, but there is no confirmation that he actually did. In 1911 he again fielded his candidature to the town hall, this time from the Vega district. He emerged successful and was one of 6 Carlists in 50-member ayuntamiento, where he remained a fairly active concejal. He led the opposition to "republicanismo blasquista", the militant liberal current led by the most popular Valencian politician, Blasco Ibañez. In 1912 latest Simó entered the nationwide Carlist executive, the 15-member Junta Nacional Tradicionalista, and in 1913 he entered its Comisión de Propaganda. Though following Navarre, Vascongadas and Catalonia the Valencian region was one of those with most significant Carlist presence, Simó is not recorded as particularly engaged in shaping the nationwide party policy; he focused rather on local Levantine issues.

As his concejal term expired, during general elections of 1914 Simó represented Carlism in Valencia; modest 12,192 votes were sufficient to ensure his triumph. As one of merely 5 Carlists in Congreso he was not very active, noted only as member of comisión de suplicatorios. He was rather banking on deputy status either lobbying in central offices for the Valencian agricultural producers or executing local propaganda activities, e.g. speaking at closed meetings or open rallies. As outbreak of the Great War produced split of the Spanish public opinion into a pro-Entente and neutralist (effectively pro-German) factions, Simó opted for the latter, and Diario de Valencia regularly published articles and photos favoring the Central Powers.

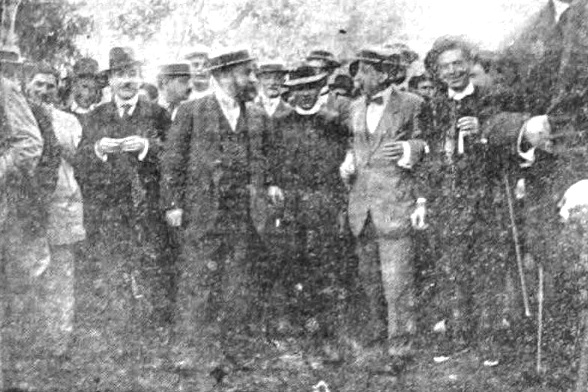
at a rally, 1914

Simó's parliamentary career turned out to have been rather brief; the lower chamber of the Cortes was dissolved in 1916. Initially he was supposed to run for renewal of his ticket and there were indeed rumors that he would stand. The Valencian Traditionalists joined a wide right-wing coalition with just one candidate, Luis García Guijarro; Simó engaged in his propaganda campaign. Shortly before the election day and probably as the result of local last-minute maneuvers, Simó was added to the list of candidates. Eventually García Guijarro obtained the ticket, but Simó – with slightly more than 5,000 votes - failed.

== Crisis (1916-1923) ==
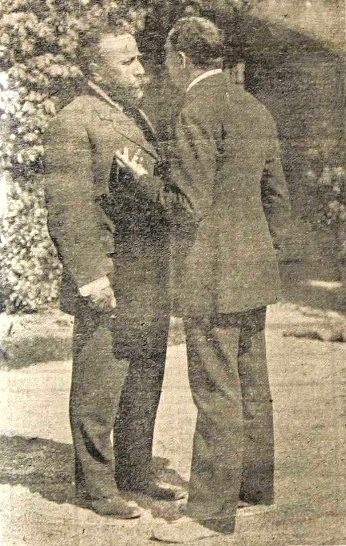
Simó (left) with Don Jaime (earlier photo)

In the mid-1910s Carlism was increasingly trapped in internal conflict between the claimant Don Jaime, during the Great War largely incommunicado in his Austrian residence, and the top party theorist and charismatic speaker, Juan Vázquez de Mella. Simó knew both leaders personally. He is not recorded among key protagonists of the conflict. It is not known whether personal changes in top layer of the Levantine Carlism were related; in unclear circumstances before mid-1917 Simó was already replaced as jefe regional by Llorens, though he remained in the executive. In early 1918 he was still referred in the press as ex-jefe, until in March he emerged in what appeared to have been a collective executive, "Jefatura Regional Jaimista", His renewed 1918 bid for the Cortes, this time from Alcoy, failed.

In early 1919 Don Jaime managed to leave Austria and arrived in Paris; he issued declarations which pledged to look into alleged collapse of discipline in the party ranks. In February and as member of "Junta Provincial Legitimista" Simó co-signed an open letter to the interim national leader Eduardo Cesareo Sanz Escartín. The signatories acknowledged grave problems in the movement and called for an "asamblea nacional", to be organized in 8 days. In the meantime, the conflict erupted; de Mella and his followers left Carlism to set up their own organisation. For some time Simó tried to act in-between the Jaimistas and the Mellistas; in May 1919 he was referred to as "jefe regional jaimista". It seems that there were two rival Jaimista factions active in Valencia during the 1919 electoral campaign; Simó decided to support García Guijarro. In December he took part in so-called Magna Junta de Biarritz, a grand Jaimista meeting.

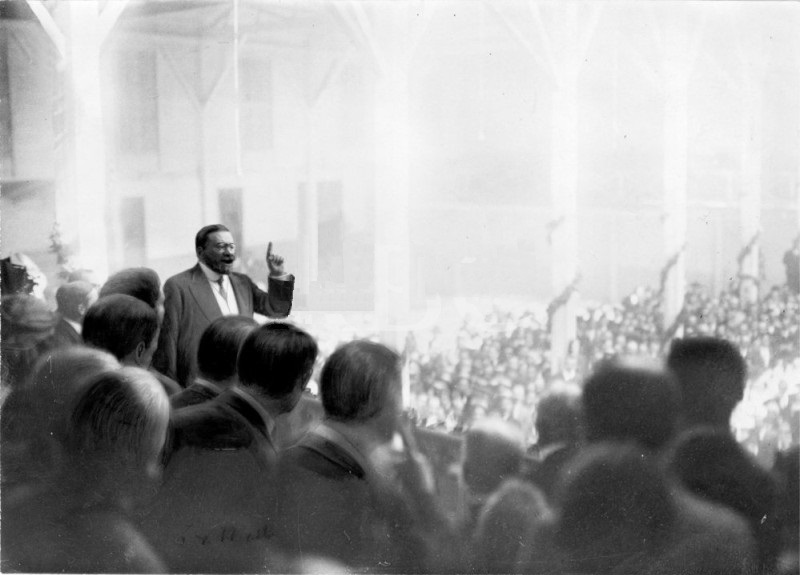
de Mella speaking

Some time in 1920 Simó joined the Mellistas. He was among representatives of "tendencia praderista del mellismo", i.e. he opted for a broad centre-right alliance instead of a far-right amalgam. However, this vision was increasingly saturated with Christian-democratic flavor. In 1921 he was elected to Diputación Provincial, the ticket renewed 2 years later. In 1922 Simó with Angel Ossorio y Gallardo, Salvador Minguijón and Severino Aznar launched Partido Social Popular. Since it denounced the political regime of restauración as non-functional, they abstained in the 1923 elections. Jeered by both Mellistas and Jaimistas, Simó mobilized support for the newly emergent party at public rallies in the summer and fall of 1923. The military coup of Miguel Primo de Rivera changed political setting in Spain. PSP leaders initially seemed to have welcomed the change and the party executive kept meeting also in December 1923; once the dictatorship brought political life to a standstill, the party disintegrated.

== Dormant period (1923-1931) ==
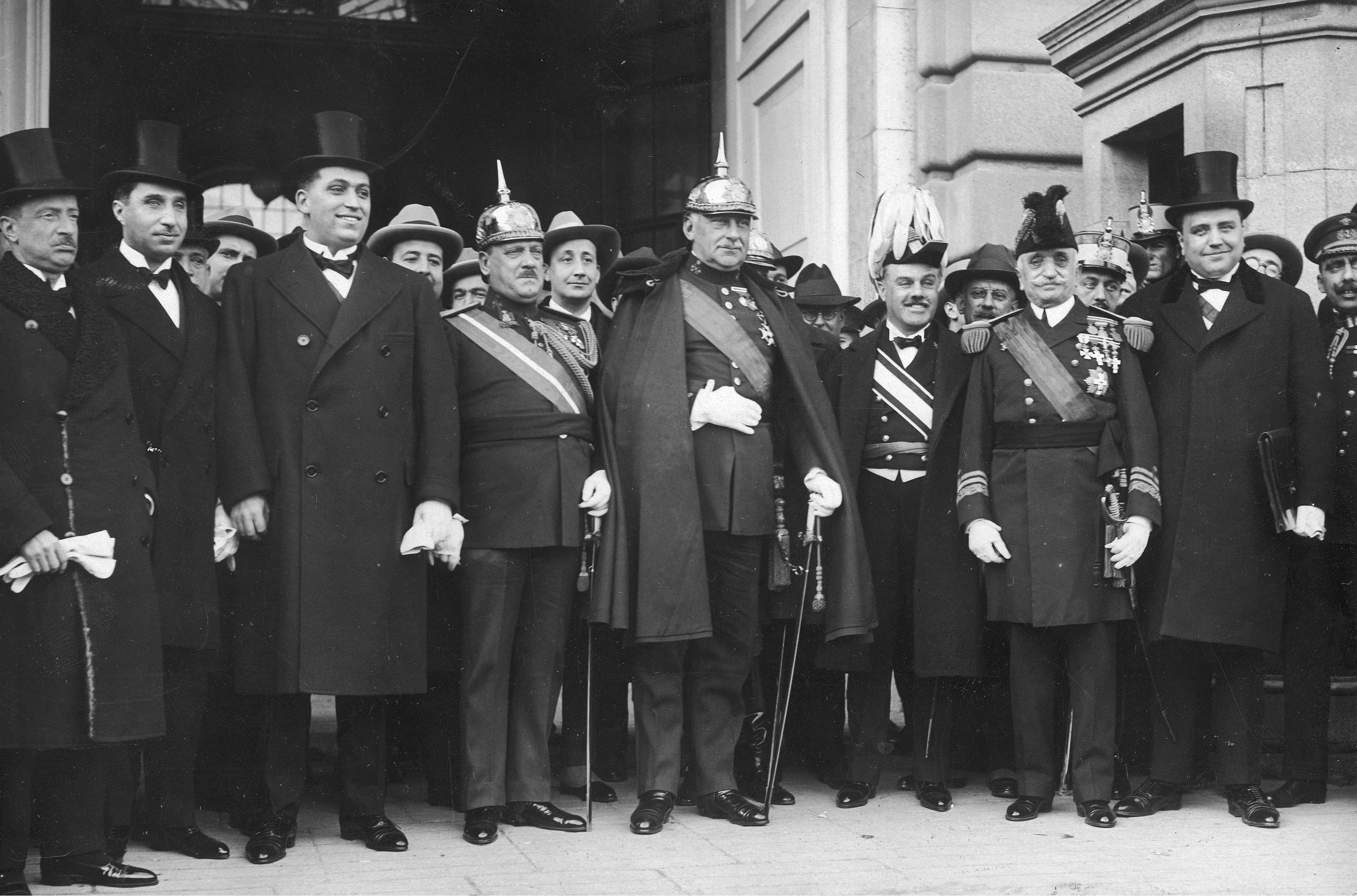
The members of Primo de Rivera's civil directorate in December 1925. In the front row, from left to right, Eduardo Callejo (Public Instruction), José Yanguas (State), José Calvo Sotelo (Treasury), Severiano Martínez Anido (Interior), Miguel Primo de Rivera (President), Count of Guadalhorce (Public Works), Honorio Cornejo (Navy) and Eduardo Aunós (Labor).

Freed from politics, Simó increasingly turned to business. Since 1910 he was in executive of an insurance company; in the early 1920s he kept developing freshly co-founded Colomer, Simó, Moscardó y Cía textile factory in Onteniente, soon to become the Simó property. In the mid-1920s he was among co-founders of Banco de Valencia and held a seat in its executive. His public activity was limited to para-political initiatives, generally formatted in line with the Christian or social-Christian values. As the person behind Diario de Valencia he repeatedly spoke on congresses of Prensa Católica, addressed gatherings of Juventud Católica, at various venues discussed papal encyclicals, lectured the audience of Legión Católica, as Franciscan tertiary supported related cultural and artistic initiatives and tried to animate Federación de Obreros Católicos de Valencia.

Simó's position towards the regime remained ambiguous and one scholar names him the leader of a local Valencian "grupo semicolaboracionista", dubbed also "grupo simonista". On the one hand, it supported the idea of doing away with the corrupted restoration regime and saw the military as an agent of change; on the other, it was anxious to retain its own identity and not to melt down in broadly designed and amorphous institutions of primoriverismo. Hence, though Simó spoke at rallies of Unión Patriótica, he did not enter the organisation; it was rather his son Manuel Simó Attard who did join and remained active in the UP youth branch.

Until the late 1920s Simó demonstrated sympathy if not support for the dictatorship. In 1925 he personally welcomed Primo de Rivera in Valencia and hailed great social work done by the dictadura; at this opportunity he declared himself a right-winger with much understanding for social issues and fate of the workers. In 1926 as co-representative of Cámara Oficial de Comercio, Industria y Navegación he entertained Primo in a Valencian factory and supported the plebiscite, intended to reinforce the powers of the dictator. However, in 1929 he voiced concern about the constitution draft; Simó thought it excessively centralist and plagued by "vision lamentablemente madrileñista".

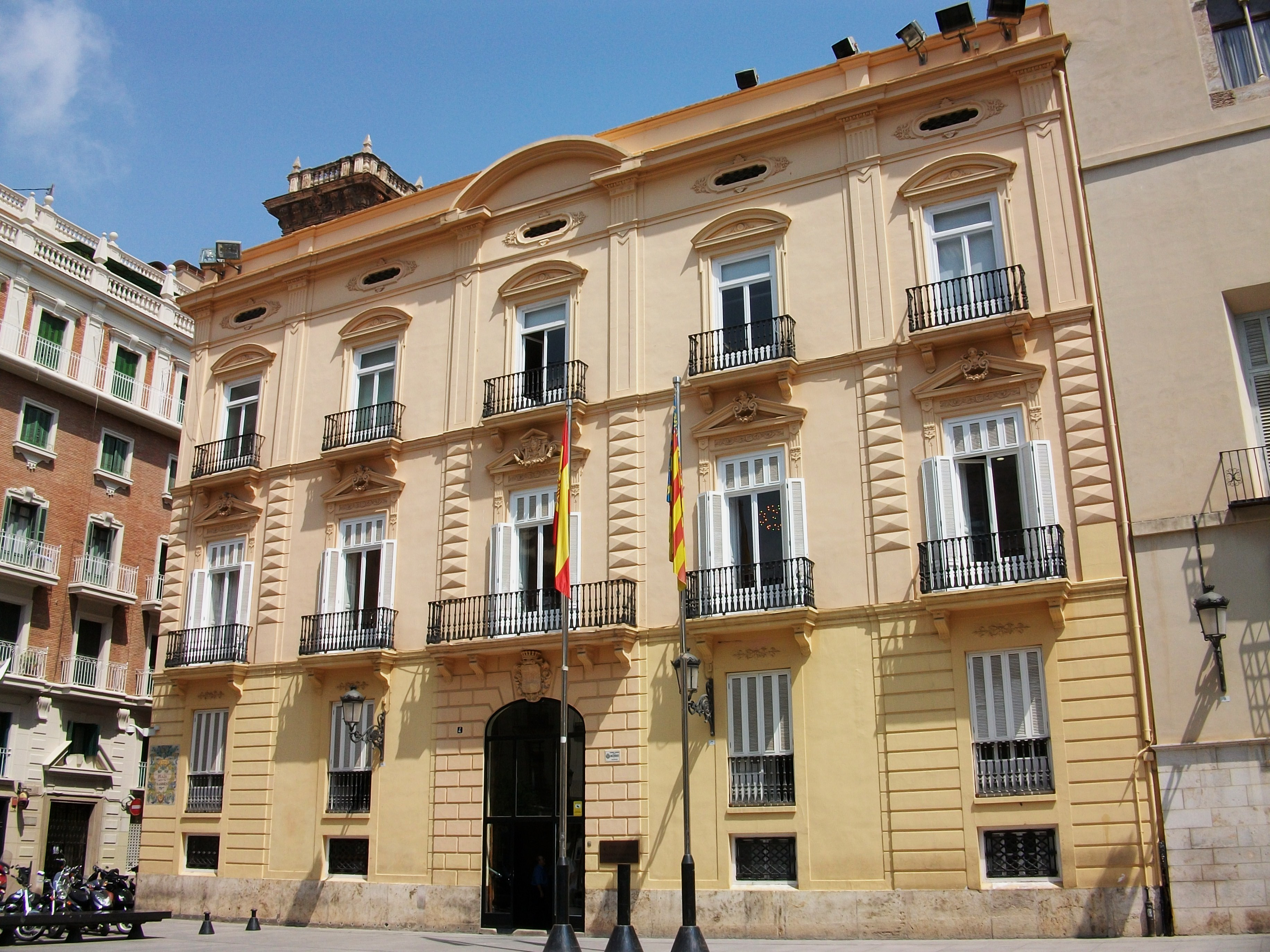
Valencia, Diputación Provincial

Almost immediately following the fall of Primo, in early 1930 Simó tried to resuscitate the concept of socially minded Christian-democratic party; the efforts were undertaken by some of his old fellow PSP members, like Angel Ossorio y Galardo, Luis Lucía y Lucía or Severino Aznar Embid, though also by new collaborators, like Maximiliano Arboleya Martínez and José María Gil-Robles. Throughout the year he took part in numerous Acción Católica meetings; in December together with José María Pemán he declared that salvation of Spain is combination of "acción social y acción política". In 1930 he was nominated to Diputación Provincial from Enguera-Onteniente. During local elections of April 1931 he appeared on the list of "concentración monarquica" in the Centro district. Though he trailed 4th after 3 republican candidates, 941 votes proved enough to secure his seat in the ayuntamiento.

== Among DRV leaders (1931-1936) ==
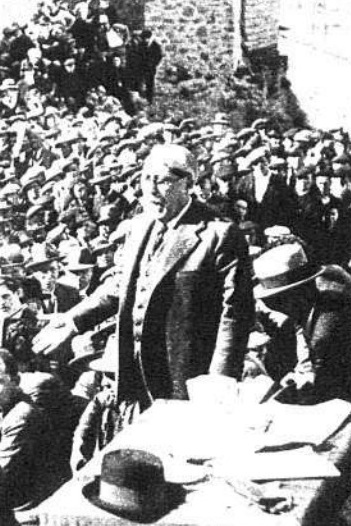
Simo speaking for Estatuto Valenciano, 1933

In the newly emergent republic Simó's mandate as gestor of Diputación Provincial was immediately cancelled, though he retained his freshly won seat in the town hall. Together with Lucía Lucía he turned one of the founding fathers of the Valencian Christian-democratic party, which materialized in 1931 as Derecha Regional Valenciana; both were its representatives in the ayuntamiento. In June 1931 Simó ran as an independent right-wing candidate to Cortes Constituyentes, but his result was nothing short of disastrous. In the initial confusion, some press titles categorized him as "católico". Some even put him in "carlista" or "católico-carlista" rubric, especially that the Simó-owned textile factory was at the time dubbed "fàbrica dels carlistes" and at electoral meetings he mixed up with Carlists like marqués de Villores and Jaime Chicharro. However, unlike many 1919 breakaways from Traditionalism in 1932 he did not join the united Carlist organization, Comunión Tradicionalista. To some scholars, emergence of DRV was the logical result of "jaimismo simonista" seeking a conservative and Catholic amalgam; Carlism suffered decomposition, while its social base and intellectual elite – i.e. Simó and Lucía – defected to DRV.

In DRV Simó emerged as the second most recognizable person, following his former Carlist subordinate and editor, Luis Lucía Lucía; however, he was leading the party minority in the town hall. It remained in opposition, protesting numerous republican reforms; in 1932 its representatives briefly withdrew from the city council protesting what they perceived as massive subsidies to secular schools, assigned in blatant disregard of needs of Catholic parents. Simó was increasingly in favor of regionalist policy. In 1933 he supported works on Estatuto Valenciano, a would-be autonomous legislation, and as consejal declared in favor of bilingualism, which would equal the status of Valencian dialect with this of castellano.

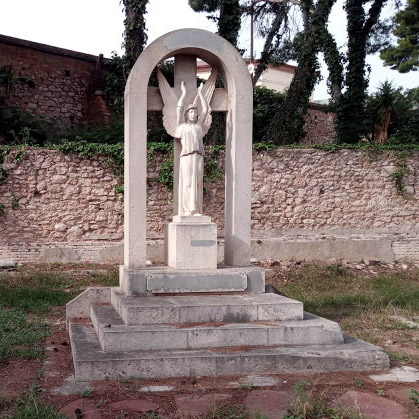
Paterna monument

Prior to general elections of 1933 DRV nominated him the party candidate on a joint right-wing list, but quoting health reasons and the need to make way for the young, he withdrew. In 1934, during the tenure of right-wing government, he was – for the 4th time – elected to Diputación Provincial from Enguera-Onteniente, the seat he would hold until his death. In his mid-60s, at times he kept speaking at DRV rallies, e.g. in 1935 in Chelva, and dismissed rumors about his discrepancies with Lucía Lucía. Another attempt to win a Cortes mandate, in February 1936 from the Valencia province district, produced support of 130.038 voters; though it was Simó's largest following ever recorded, it was also insufficient to ensure a ticket in the large suburban constituency. In June 1936 he celebrated weddings of his 2 daughters. After the July coup he was detained; following a few weeks in prison, he was extracted in one of the sacas and together with 2 sons, brother and nephew executed at a place known as Picadero de Paterna.

== See also ==
- Carlism
- Traditionalism (Spain)
- Valencian regionalism

== Footnotes ==
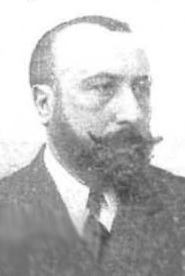
Simo Marin, ca 1910
