= Luis García Guijarro =

Spanish lawyer and politician (1885–1974)

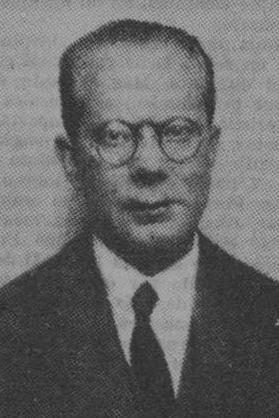
- Born: Luis García Guijarro; 1883; Valencia, Spain
- Died: 1974; Madrid, Spain
- Occupation: civil servant
- Known for: politician, official
- Political party: Carlism, PCT, PSP, UP, DRV, FET

Luis García Guijarro (1883–1974) was a Spanish politician and civil servant. Initially he was active within the traditionalist Carlist movement, then he joined the breakaway Mellistas, settled well in the Primo de Rivera regime, emerged as a key Derecha Regional Valenciana leader within CEDA, and eventually merged within the Francoist structures. He was elected to the Cortes in 1916, 1918, 1919, 1920, 1923, 1933 and 1936, though his 1920 ticket has been annulled. His career of civil servant climaxed with the short-lived 1931 nomination to director general of the Customs Office. Between 1916 and 1951 during short strings he served as either consul or commercial attaché in Hamburg, Damascus, Newcastle, Managua, Boston, again Damascus and Washington; in 1935–1936 he was the Spanish minister plenipotentiary to Czechoslovakia. He held also numerous minor jobs in central administration and abroad. Throughout most of his career García Guijarro was an active lobbyist on part of the Valencian orange industry.

== Family and youth ==
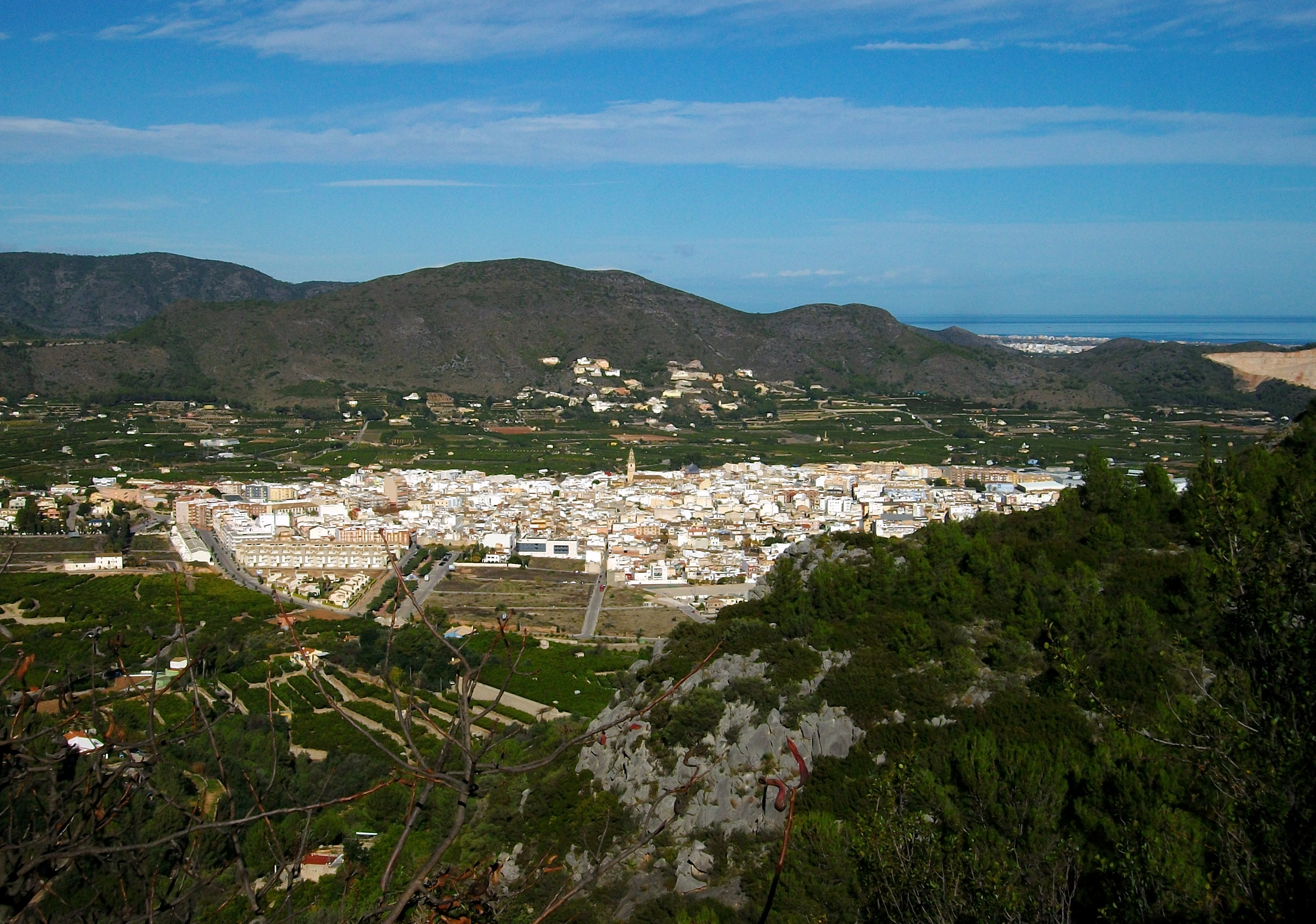
Pego, present view

There is nothing known about distant ancestors of Luis García Guijarro; none of the sources consulted provides any information which branch of the Levantine Garcías he descended from. The only forebear identified was his father, Luis García Andreu (1847-1910). In 1877 he was appointed registrador de la propiedad, an official close to the real estate notary; at the time he was posted to the town of Pego, in the province of Alicante. Either in 1878 or a year later he married Josefa Guijarro Mendoza (1857–1926); almost nothing is known about her except that she was very pious. Some contemporary press and present-day sources alike claim that Luis descended from the family of Aparisi Guijarro or even that he was a nephew of the great Traditionalist thinker, Antonio Aparisi Guijarro; however, no details are provided and along the matriline his grandfather was an unrelated Fernando Guijarro Estupiñan.

Luis García Andreu and Josefa Guijarro Mendoza settled in Pego. He kept ascending along the professional path; though he performed the same role of property registrar until death, Luis García kept moving to larger and more prestigious locations. In 1886 he was nominated registrador de la propiedad in Yecla, a city in the neighboring province of Murcia, where he served during the following 9 or 10 years; at the time he acted also as the Yecla representative of Unión de Propietarios Vinícolas de España and a “propietario” himself. Either in 1895 or 1896 the family moved to the coastal city of Gandia (Valencia province), where Luis kept serving as the registrar. He became a well known local personality; apart from official role he was also in executive of the Gandian Casa de Ahorros and remained an active correspondent of numerous Catholic newspapers and periodicals; none of his articles has been identified and it seems he published under a pen-name. The couple had 7 children, Luis born as the second one and the oldest son.

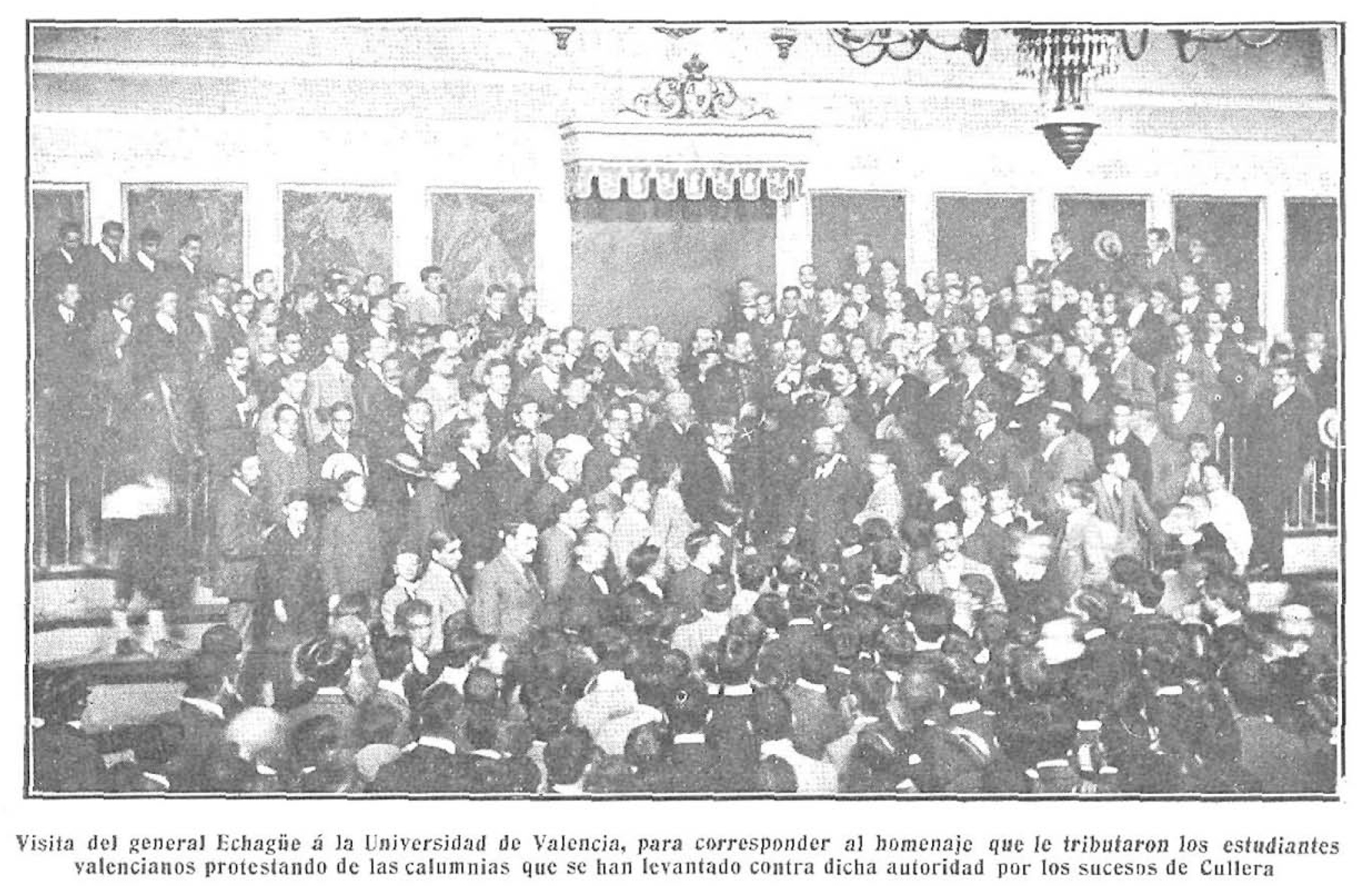
Valencia University, 1911

The young Luis spent childhood in Yecla and early teens in Gandia. At unspecified time prior to 1902 he entered the faculty of law at the University of Valencia and was an active student. He double majored in law and philosophy/letters. In 1906 he applied for the chair of historia de España Antigua y media in Seville, but nothing is known about him assuming the job. In 1908 he received a governmental grant enabling further research abroad; first he studied in France at Sorbonne and in Toulouse, and then between 1909 and 1910 in the United States at Yale, where he focused on social sciences. Having returned he was admitted as auxiliar interino at the faculty of philosophy and letters at Universidad Central in Madrid. At unspecified time though after 1919 he married Lucila Gómez Sisniega (1896–1927), previously employed as “modista”. The couple settled in Madrid; they had no children. In 1946 García Guijarro remarried with Anastacia Ramos Díaz (1914–2005). Their only child, Luis García-Guijarro Ramos, is professor of medieval history at the University of Zaragoza.

== Early public activity ==
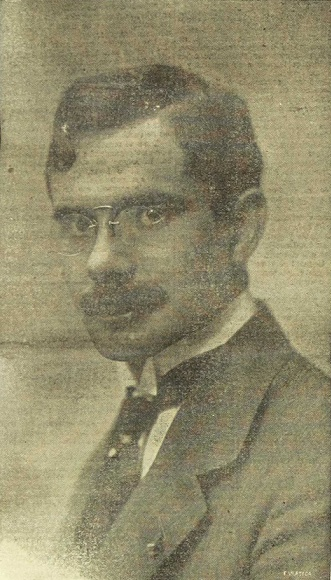
in his late 20s

García Guijarro's father was a vehement and die-hard Carlist; during the Third Carlist War he managed a local periodical El Volante de la Guerra, contributed to another one titled El Católico, and according to some sources he was co-responsible for executions in Valles, where he reportedly acted as the representative of Carlos VII. Also 25 years later, in the late 1890s, he was referred to as "carlista enragé". The young Luis inherited political preferences from his father and in his early 20s used to publish under pen-names in the Carlist semi-official mouthpiece, El Correo Español. However, he was also attracted to a new phenomenon of social Catholicism. As a student he gave lectures on socialismo católico and inspired by Rerum Novarum, in the early 1900s he co-founded and helped to run Caixa d’Estalvis de Gandia, the institution managed by the local priest Carlos Ferrís. In Gandia he was also involved in charity activities related to the buildup of sanitary infrastructure to treat leprosy.

Initially García Guijarro demonstrated some leaning towards literature and science. Following early pamphlets in 1908 he published both his doctoral dissertations; La guerra de la Independencia y el guerillero Romeu was dedicated to a local Valencian hero of anti-Napoleonic war José Romeu Parras, while Agustín Sales. Apuntes bio-bibliográficos focused on Agustín Sales Alcalá, a Valencian Franciscan theologian and one of great figures of Spanish mid-18th century Enlightenment. When in the United States he contributed unorthodox Spain-related articles to numerous American periodicals, including the prestigious The American Review of Reviews; 3 years after return to Spain García Guijarro published an account of his spell in the US, Notas americanas (1913). In 1911 he published a legal work Bases del derecho inmobiliario en la legislación comparada and in 1914 he translated from French a juridical study of Jorge de Lacoste. Apart from membership in the Valencian Colegio de Abogados, in the mid-1910s he was also a member of the American Historical Association.

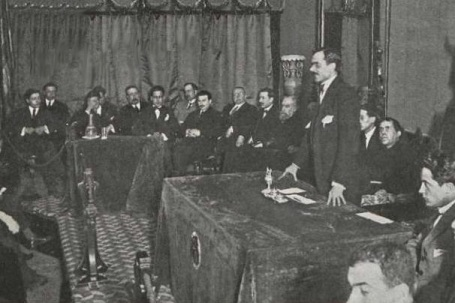
Garcia Guijarro speaking at Academia Valencianista, 1910s

García Guijarro's professional record of the early 1910s is unclear. It is known that in 1912 he renounced his chair of auxiliar interino at facultad de filosofía y letras in Universidad Central. In 1913 he was reported as entering the competition for the chair of España Antigua y media at the University of Barcelona; another source claims he applied for a job at Facultad de Derecho. However, in 1914 and 1916 he was still noted as teaching at Universidad Central. In 1916 he again applied for España Antigua y media in Barcelona, though eventually he did not sit the exams. Also in 1916 García Guijarro entered examination for consular service and few weeks later he was nominated vice-consul in Hamburg. It is known that his term in Germany lasted at least until 1917. According to one unfriendly source, he was expelled from service as a zealous Germanophile, who compromised the Spanish diplomacy by voicing open support for German submarines, which at the time were sinking merchant ships in the Atlantic.

== Carlista ==
Carlist standard

In the early 1910s García Guijarro started to emerge as a young star of Valencian Carlism; he kept contributing to El Correo Español and used to speak during indoor meetings, e.g. delivering lectures at Circulo Jaimista in Valencia. At the time the Levantine branch of the movement was dominated by 3 personalities: Manuel Polo Peyrolón, Joaquín Llorens Fernández and Manuel Simó Marín, the latter two politicians in conflict with Polo; it is not clear who García Guijarro sided with. Prior to the electoral campaign of 1916 he and Simó were appointed by the provincial Jaimista structures to represent the party on a broad right-wing coalition list. Simó failed; García Guijarro's result of 9,537 votes gathered out of 51,867 possible was sufficient to ensure his triumph. It took a special Cortes electoral commission to declare his consular duty compatible with the Cortes mandate. In the chamber García Guijarro proved a fairly active deputy. He was busy mostly with promotion of local Valencian issues, e.g. advocating construction of new roads, though he voiced also against what was perceived as anti-religious, secular governmental policy and participated in debates on civil service, especially the consular network. Banking on his deputy status, he frequented local Carlist rallies and took to the floor as a distinguished speaker.

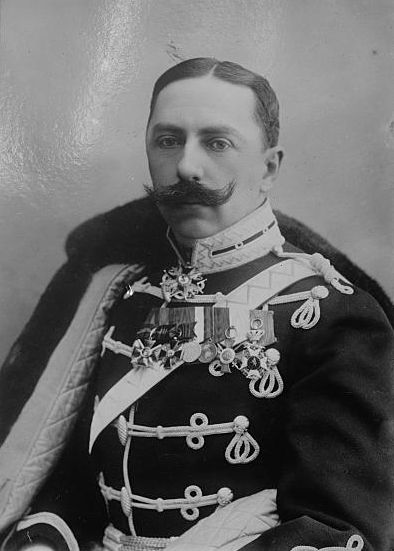
Carlist claimant Don Jaime, 1910s

In 1916 García Guijarro visited his king, at the time sort of incommunicado at home arrest in Frohsdorf. The episode remains somewhat obscure; it seems that at the time he still acted as a Spanish consul in Hamburg, though other sources suggest he was briefly detained and interrogated at the police station, as the Austrian security services suspected him of spying. Don Jaime handed him letters to the Spanish party executive; in the documents he demanded strict Carlist neutrality during the Great War. There are doubts as to what happened later. A pro-French Carlist campaigner, Francisco Melgar, claimed that García Guijarro kept at least some documents to himself, which contributed to disorientation within Carlism and allowed pro-German propaganda by the key party theorist, Juan Vázquez de Mella. A present-day historian maintains that the letters were promptly delivered to the party jefé Marquéz de Cerralbo.

In the following general elections of 1918 the party Junta Provincial again appointed García Guijarro as one of two Carlist candidates. He was again successful as member of a broad right-wing coalition, though he failed to improve his performance compared to 1916: García Guijarro gathered 9,521 votes out of 53,410 possible in the Valencian district. Like in the previous term, in the chamber he focused mostly on local Valencian issues, e.g. discussing agricultural problems or excessive fiscal burden imposed upon smaller municipalities. He remained particularly engaged in promotion of the key Levantine product, oranges, and a number of times lobbied in favor of local orange growers. However, he voiced also in general questions like regulations referring to state civil servants. On exceptional basis he attended Carlist party events beyond his native Levantine region, e.g. in the Navarrese Alsasua.

== Mellista ==
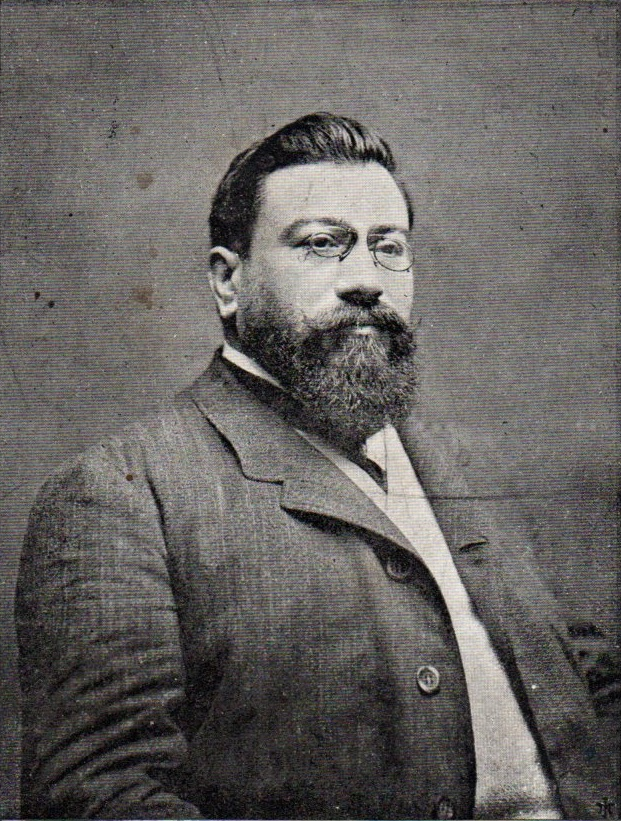
Juan Vazquez de Mella

In the late 1910s Carlism was increasingly paralyzed by conflict between supporters of Vázquez de Mella and followers of Don Jaime; the former advocated pro-German stand and a grand ultra-right coalition, the latter was leaning towards the Entente and demanded that political alliances did not jeopardize the dynastic issue. García Guijarro tended to side with de Mella and already during the 1916 and 1918 elections he was considered a Mellista. This was due not only to his alleged Germanophile sentiments, but also because he was inclined towards right-wing coalitions, which twice ensured his Cortes mandate; since the mid-1910 he was engaged in a Valencian right-wing umbrella organisation Agrupación Regional de Acción Católica. When in early 1919 the conflict between de Mella and Don Jaime erupted into a full-scale confrontation, García Guijarro decided to join the breakaway Mellistas; together with 6 deputies and senators he issued a statement against Don Jaime.

Following the secession García Guijarro attempted to take away the entire Valencian structures of Jaimismo and seize the local casa social, but failed. Following initial confusion in the 1919 elections García Guijarro stood as Mellista on the list of Derechas Valencianas. The campaign was very confrontational, especially between the Mellistas and the Jaimistas; García Guijarro was physically assaulted and suffered injuries. He was elected with 13,974 votes out of 43,325 possible and in the chamber he assumed presidency of a minuscule minoria mellista. The term was brief and in the following campaign of 1920 he stood again. He hoped to get Carlist votes and by some was presented as candidato legitimista; the party leader Larramendi disauthorized him. Eventually he ran on Mellista ticket supported by Liga Católica and got elected. However, following few weeks his ticket was annulled on technical grounds - by scholars referred against the background of electoral fraud - in early 1921.

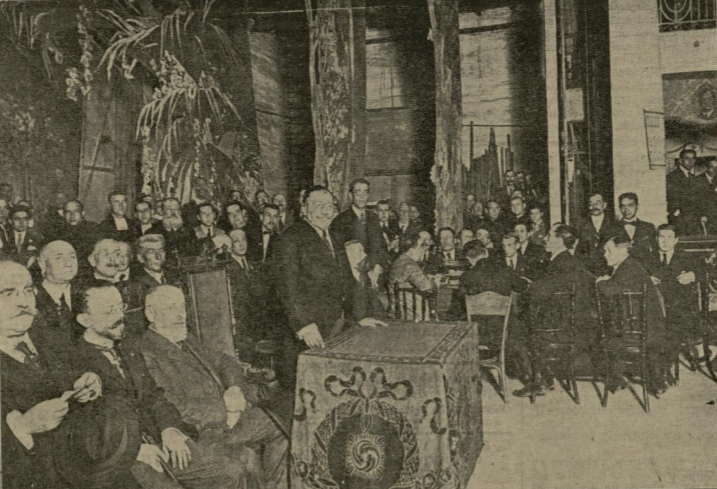
Mellista rally, 1921

In 1921 García Guijarro returned to the consular service and was appointed to Damascus, but in May of this year he became the second class consul in Newcastle, the role performed at least until 1923. Back in Spain during the 1923 electoral campaign he again fielded his candidature to the Cortes, again in the Valencia district. He appeared as a Mellista on the list of the Defensa Social coalition, formed by Liga Católica, the Integrists and the Mellists. The campaign was again very confrontational, especially against the Jaimista candidate Marqués de Villores; there were some brawls and disturbances recorded. Eventually with 10,817 votes out of 45,045 possible he emerged victorious. At the time García Guijarro was already close to the nascent offshoot post-Mellista party, Partido Social Popular; the initiative failed to take off the ground as the Primo de Rivera coup soon brought political life in Spain to a standstill.

== Primoriverrista ==
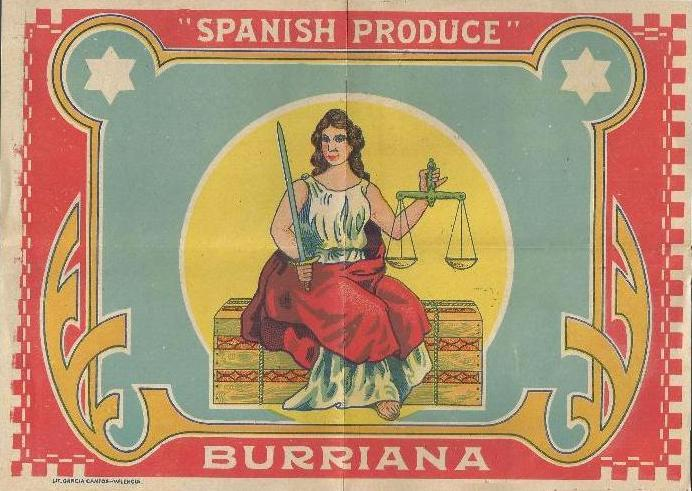
label of export Valencian oranges, interwar period

During first years after the military coup García Guijarro did not appear in politics. Most information on his public activity is related to Unión Nacional de Exportación Agrícola, a syndicate grouping mostly exporters of citrus fruits. In 1924 for the first time he appeared in its executive, listed as a treasurer. During the following year he remained active as the UNEA lobbyist in Madrid and in 1926 he became secretario general of the organisation. García Guijarro attended numerous commercial conferences and meetings; the one of particular importance was Conferencia Nacional Naranjera, staged by the provincial Valencian Cámara Oficial Agrícola and UNEA with the royal patronage. He also published a few booklets discussing either technicalities of the fruit industry or Spanish international commerce, mostly focused on oranges.

In 1926 García Guijarro assumed a post in the central state administration; he became a member of Comisión Permanente de Comercio within Ministerio de Trabajo, Comercio e Industria. The same year and as the representative of UNEA he was nominated by the military directorio to Junta Central de Puertos. In 1927 he was appointed to Sección de Tratados within Consejo de la Economía Nacional; his interest was, among others, the Spanish-American commerce. In 1928 García Guijarro got nominated to another advisory body, Junta de Crédito Agrícola. The climax of his engagement in primoriverrista structures was the 1927 appointment to Asamblea Nacional Consultiva; he received nomination from the pool of Representantes de Actividades de la Vida Nacional. Admitted by Alfonso XIII and by Primo, he emerged among key lobbyists of the Valencian orange industry business in the capital.

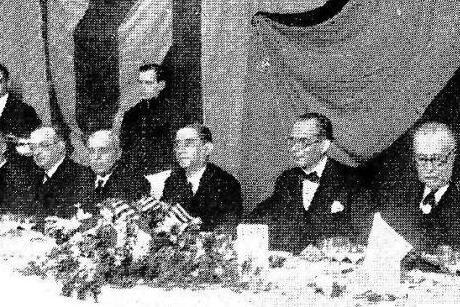
García Guijarro (2fR) as director of Customs Office, 1931

Information on García Guijarro's activity in the late 1920s is confusing. He was reported as active in various economy-related state bodies, like Junta Central de Puertos or Comisión Permanente del Comercio, and collected appointments to new ones, like Comisión del Patrón Oro or to executive of Banco Exterior de España. He was also nominated the academic of Academia de San Carlos. However, the press reported his numerous appointments within the consular service abroad; in 1928 to Managua, in 1929 and as cónsul de primera clase to Boston, and in 1930 again to Damascus. He supervised Spanish sections at trade expositions in Antwerp/Liege, Frankfurt and Prague and took part in official Spanish trade missions, e.g. in the UK. Still active within UNEA, he turned his attention to Eastern Europe: he gave lectures on trade perspectives with Czechoslovakia and entered Comité Hispanoeslavo. His career as civil servant climaxed in February 1931, when García Guijarro was nominated Director General de Aduanas. At the time the dictablanda regime was crumbling; in general elections, planned for the spring of 1931, García Guijarro together with Luis Lucía was supposed to represent Derecha Regional Valenciana.

== Cedista ==
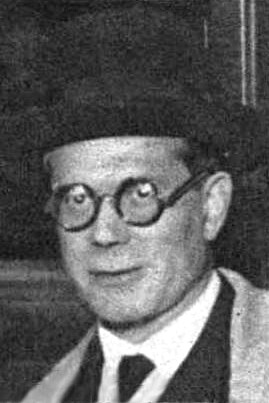
García Guijarro, 1933

The new Republican government dismissed García Guijarro from head of the Customs Office in mid-April 1931; his tenure barely lasted 2 months. During the general elections of June 1931 DRV did not field its candidates; he stood as independent and lost to left-wing candidates. However, in the district of Valencia elections proved inconclusive and the second round was needed. In October he stood as the candidate of Derecha Regional Valenciana, though some newspapers dubbed him a Carlist and some advertised him as a generic Catholic candidate; with 18,924 votes he came third and narrowly failed to win the mandate. García Guijarro focused on his role in orange exporters syndicate, by some dubbed “alma de la UNEA”; he kept lobbying and lecturing. He resumed some teaching duties at Complutense, listed as professor auxiliar at Filosofía y Letras. In public he seemed to have accepted the new regime, e.g. during a monetary conference in 1932 he declared satisfaction with the economic course of the government. In early 1933 he was reported as “consejero comercial de España en los Balkanes”, but his tenure did not last beyond 1934.

In the 1933 elections García Guijarro again represented DRV, though he enjoyed support also of the monarchists from Renovación Española. He was comfortably elected with 111,618 votes gathered; due to his post in the administration there were some doubts about his ticket, which in early 1934 was eventually confirmed by the electoral commission. He joined the CEDA parliamentary group and was the party secretary general. His activity in the chamber and beyond was mostly about international trade, with particular focus on citrus fruits; his public interventions were related e.g. to Spanish commerce with France, Romania or the Netherlands. The left-wing press denounced him as one of the sinister “superviventes de la dictadura”. In early 1935 the centre-right government appointed him to the highest post abroad so far, this time not in the consular but in the diplomatic service: he was nominated minister plenipotentiary to Czechoslovakia. He arrived in Prague to assume office in May 1935.

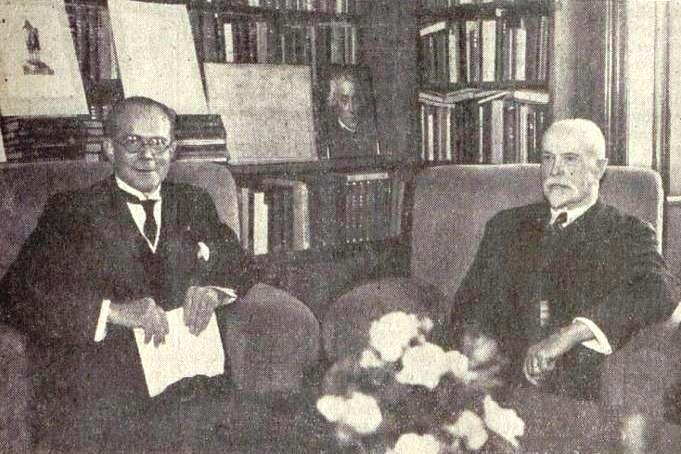
with president Masaryk, 1935

Until early 1936 García Guijarro's relations with the official strata were good; in January he was admitted at a personal audience by the president, Niceto Alcalá-Zamora. During the general elections of February 1936 he traditionally represented Derecha Regional Valenciana in the Valencia district; his 7th electoral try produced the largest support so far and with 140,561 votes out of 308,694 possible he easily prolonged his parliamentary ticket. There were again some doubts as to his mandate, but Comisión de Actas confirmed it in May. It is not clear whether García Guijarro took part in a single sitting of the new Cortes, as he kept residing in Czechoslovakia and tried to develop export of Spanish oranges. However, in early June 1936 Cortes found his diplomatic role incompatible with parliamentary mandate and he filed his resignation from the Prague post. He was asked to remain in office until his substitute is appointed.

== Franquista ==
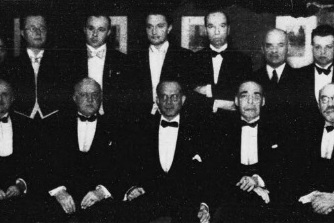
among members of diplomatic corps, Prague 1936 (centre, 1st row)

Despite initial doubts either in July or in August 1936 García Guijarro declared support for Junta de Defensa Nacional. The Republican decree which dismissed him was issued either in mid- or in late August 1936. His whereabouts during the next few months are unclear. In March 1937 he was in the Nationalist zone and donated money to Junta de Defensa; when noting the donation the press did not refer to any role. In mid-1937 Junta Técnica nominated him Delegado Especial de Presidencia for the Balearic Islands and he was engaged in control of local exports. In March 1938 he was admitted by the vice-president of Junta Técnica and the acting Francoist minister of foreign affairs, Jordana; also in May Jordana admitted him at an audiencia diplomatica. In August he was nominated president of the almond section within Subcomisión de Frutos Secos of the quasi-ministry of economy and based in Palma, in late 1938 he supervised almond crops in the Baleares. He was last referred as head of the subcomisión in July 1939.

In the summer of 1938 he was re-admitted to the diplomatic service; in 1941 he was acknowledged as ministro plenipotenciario de tercera clase, but it is not known where he served. In 1943 he was nominated ministro-consejero de economía exterior at the Spanish embassy in the US. Some Americans perceived his appointment as controversial; John M. Coffee denounced him as a Fascist sidekick of Juan March, who supported German submarine warfare during World War One. In the mid-1940s García Guijarro a few times travelled from the United States to Mexico to explore prospects of resuming Spanish-Mexican diplomatic relations. In the mid-1940s Martín Artajo considered his promotion to embassador in Washington, but Franco had other preferences. Lequerica referred to García Guijarro as "rojillo" and wanted him removed altogether, especially that Garcia Guijarro was highly critical of the official economic policy. Fearing Lequerica's harassment, García Guijarro refused the post of consul in San Francisco. He remained in Washington and terminated his mission in the US in 1951.

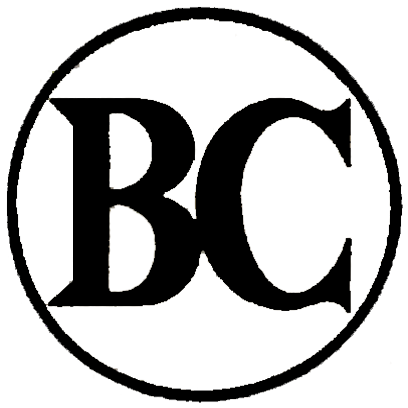
Banco Central logotype

In 1951 García Guijarro was promoted to ministro plenipotenciario de primera clase, but there is no information on his assignment. In 1953 the Ministry of Foreign Affairs declared him “en situación de disponible”, effectively given the status of a retiree. Already in his 70s he withdrew into privacy and no longer featured in the press; the exception were his rare appearances in societé columns, usually related to various family events, and acknowledgement of his study on the Levantine orange industry. Since then he entirely disappeared from the public eye, though due to his old familiarity with Ignacio Villalonga he was associated with Banco Central and until the mid-1960s he kept writing regular reports on economic and financial situation in the country. There are no further details available on the last 10 years of his life. Apart from a private necrological note, his death in 1974 went almost entirely unnoticed and no obituaries appeared in the press.

== See also ==
- Carlism
- Traditionalism (Spain)
- Mellismo
- Notas americanas online
