= Valencian nationalism =

Political movement in Spain

Valencian nationalism (Valencian: Nacionalisme valencià; IPA: [nasionaˈlizme valensiˈa]) or Valencianism (Valencian: Valencianisme) is a political movement in the Valencian Community, Spain.

It advocates the promotion and recognition of the Valencian language, culture and the political sovereignty of the Valencian Community. As an ideology, it has had varying levels of social and political influence since the nineteenth century, contributing to the consolidation of self-government in the Valencian Community as a political entity tracing its origins to the Ancient Kingdom of Valencia. Sometimes Catalan-nationalist groups are also included under the name of Valencian nationalism, as some Valencian nationalists see the Land of Valencia as part of the Catalan nation.

Historically, Valencianism originates in the 19th century as a cultural movement during the Renaixença, a period of time where intellectuals tried to recover the culture status for the Valencian language after centuries of diglossia and the suppression of the Kingdom of Valencia under Bourbon absolutism with initiatives like the Floral Games held by Lo Rat Penat. Scissions from this association would be the first political organisations of the Valencianism, appeared at the beginning of the 20th century. The symbolical birthdate of Valencianism is considered to be 1902, when Faustí Barberà reads De regionalisme i valentinicultura. One of the first milestones for Valencianism would be the Declaració Valencianista made in 1918, although it was not until the Second Spanish Republic that Valencianism would achieve certain political influence and a climate prone to achieve a Statute of Autonomy. With the creation of Francoist Spain, the Valencianist tradition was repressed and Valencian regionalism was dissolved and instrumentalised in Spain. In the 1960s Joan Fuster i Ortells emerged as a referent of a modern Valencianism, the Fusterianism that broke with the discourse of the regionalism allowed by the state. The importance given by the Fusteranists to the cultural and linguistic unity of the Catalan Countries, concept that became central in his proposal, would explain the emergence of the blaverism, an anti-Catalanist Valencian regionalism.

== Bibliography ==
- Archilés i Cardona, Ferran (2010). Transició pólitica i qüestió nacional al País Valencià. Fulls de recerca i pensament. Catarroja. p. 810. ISBN 978-84-92542-41-3. ISSN 0213-1471.
- Archilés i Cardona, Ferran (2012). Una singularitat amarga, Joan Fuster i el relat de la identitat valenciana. Catarroja: afers. p. 426. ISBN 978-84-92542-64-2.
- Archilés Cardona, Ferran (2012). "La identitat valenciana a l'època contemporània: una perspectiva històrica". In Vicent Flor i Moreno (ed.). Nació i identitats, pensar el País Valencià. Afers. ISBN 978-84-92542-80-2.
- Bodoque Arribas, Anselm (2011). La política lingüística dels governs valencians (1983–2008): Un estudi de polítiques públiques. Universitat de València. p. 246. ISBN 978-8437083698.
- Català i Oltra, Lluís (2012). Fonaments de la identitat territorial amb especial atenció a la identitat nacional. El cas valencià: discursos polítics sobre la identitat valenciana entre els militants de base del Bloc, EUPV i PSPV-PSOE. Universitat d'Alacant.
- Flor i Moreno, Vicent (2010). L'anticatalanisme al País Valencià. Identitat i reproducció social del discurs del "Blaverisme" (PDF). València: Universitat de València. ISBN 978-84-370-7648-5.
- Flor i Moreno, Vicent (2011). Noves glòries a Espanya. Anticatalanisme i identitat valenciana (1a ed.). Catarroja: editorial Afers. ISBN 978-84-92542-47-5.
- Flor i Moreno, Vicent (2015). Societat Anònima. Els valencians, els diners i la política (1a ed.). Catarroja: editorial Afers. ISBN 978-84-16260-07-2.
- Sanchis i Llàcer, Vicent (2012). Valencians, encara. Cinquanta anys després de Joan Fuster. Barcelona: Proa. ISBN 978-84-7588-359-5.
