= Flag of the Valencian Community =

Flag in Spain

Valencian Community
- Senyera
- Use: Civil and state flag
- Proportion: 2:3 (not formalised by law)
- Adopted: 1 July 1982; 44 years ago
- Design: Four red stripes on a yellow field crowned over a blue band by the hoist.
- Use: Civil flag
- Proportion: 1:2

The flag of the Valencian Community and of the city of Valencia, known as Reial Senyera (Valencian pronunciation: [reˈjal seˈɲeɾa], "Royal Senyera"), is the traditional Senyera, composed of four red bars on a yellow background, crowned with a blue strip party per pale next to the hoist. It was adopted on 1 July 1982.

It is an historical derivation of the Senyera, the heraldic symbol of the Crown of Aragon, also used today with few variations in all the former kingdoms and principality which were a part of this crown.

== History of the flag ==
As many other flags of medieval origin, the Senyera, or "Senyal Reial" (royal ensign), was used in those years as the arms of the King of Aragon. While not existing still in the Middle Ages, the concept of national flag as understood today, the true symbol of the nationality was constituted on the royal shield.

Arms of the City of Valencia

It is traditionally considered that a Senyera was granted by James I of Aragon as the arms of Valencia following the Christian conquest from Moorish rule in 1238, although the earliest sources related to this are dated in 1377, when the City Council agreed to replace the old arms used for seals with a new one with the Senyera. While the origins of the usage of the Senyera as a coat of arms remain unclear in the agreement, a crown in the helm and two "L" as supporters were added, according to an honour awarded by Peter IV of Aragon for the loyalty and courage shown by Valencians to him in several wars such as the War of the Two Peters against the Kingdom of Castile.

This Valencian coat of arms began to be used in textile standard as a pennon, including the crown in a fringe, although the blue colour was slightly different. It was bipartida, meaning two swallow tails, or abocellada (Spanish: abocelada), that's only one swallow rounded and higher tail. The latter is one of the two shapes used and officially regulated today, together with the rectangle, for Valencian municipalities.

The only currently preserved pennon, commonly considered a copy of the original, was made in the 17th century and is kept, though very damaged, at the City Historical Archive of Valencia.

=== Historical flags ===
The Pennon of the Conquest of Valencia. Unknown ratio

Flag used by Pre-autonomous Council of the Valencian Country (1979–1980). 2∶3

Proposed flag during the Statute of Benicassim. Unknown ratio

Historical version of the Valencian senyera, between 15th and 18th centuries. Unknown ratio

Political Flags

Valencian nationalism estrelada. Unknown ratio

Flag of Esquerra Valenciana during the Second Spanish Republic. Unknown ratio

=== Gallery ===
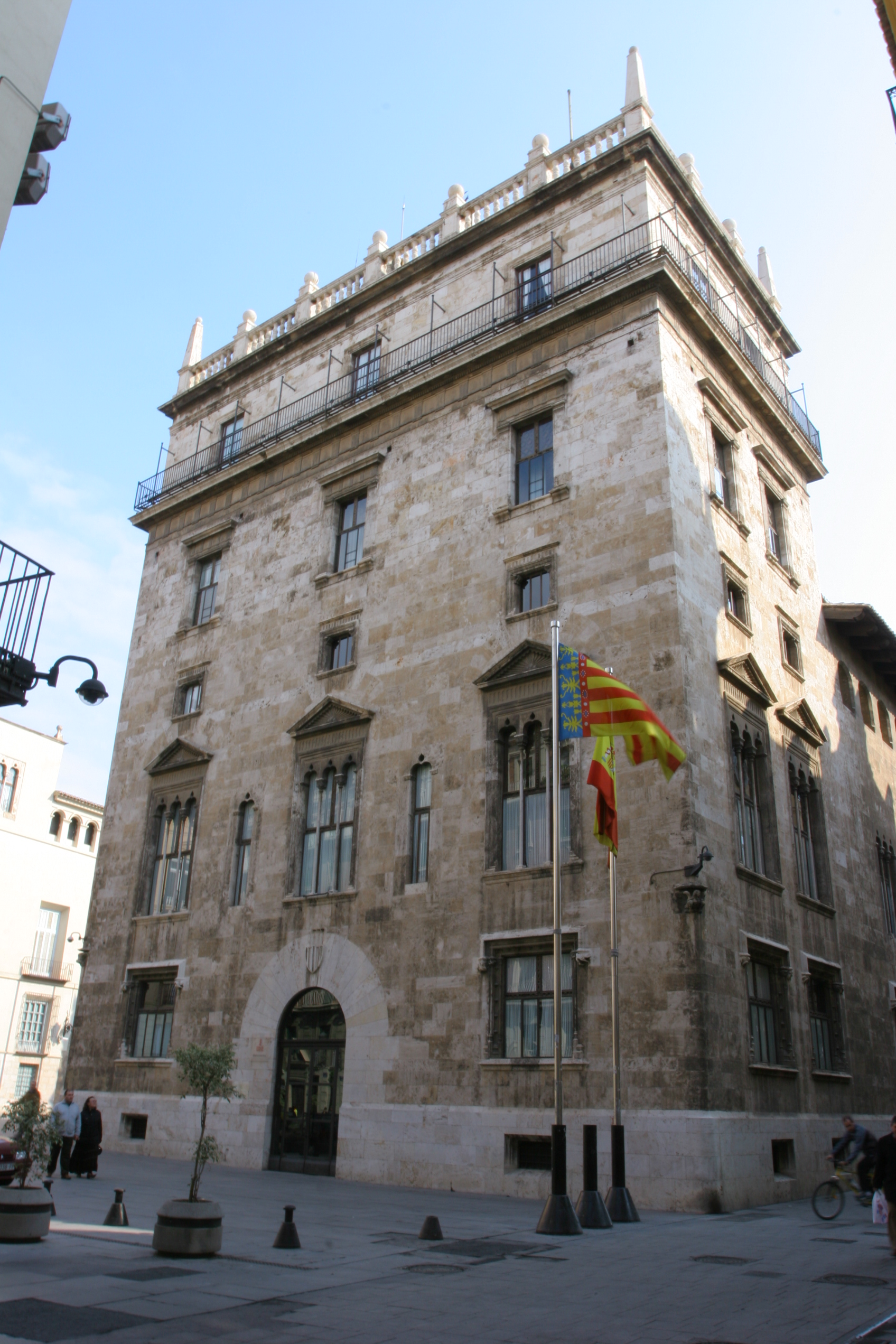
Hoisted at the Palau de la Generalitat

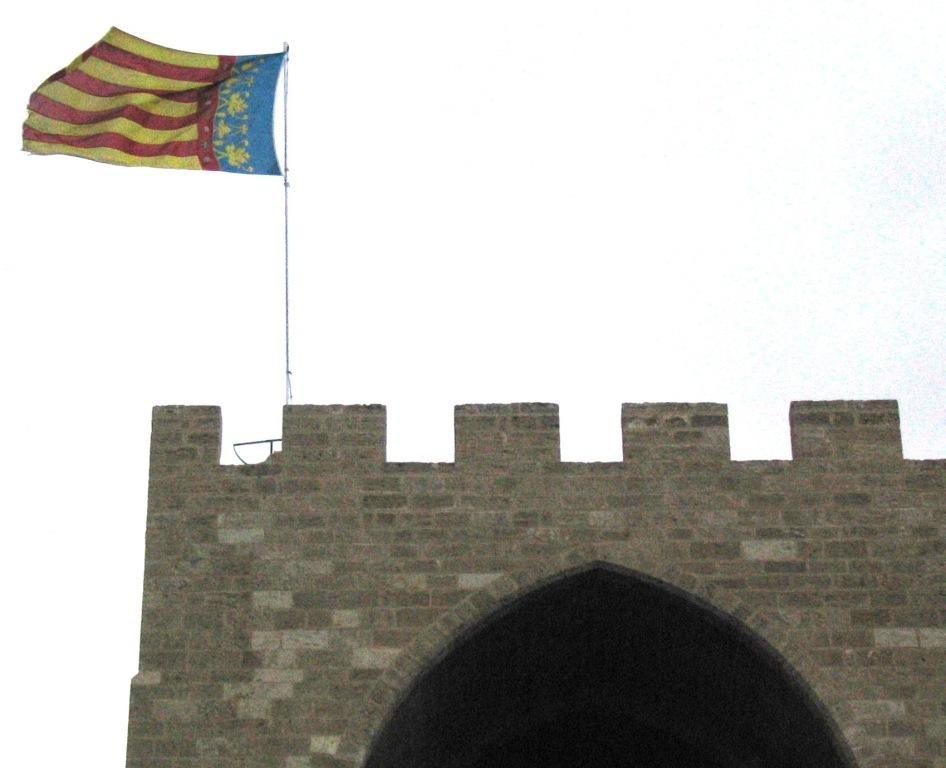
Flying at top of Torres de Serranos (Valencia)

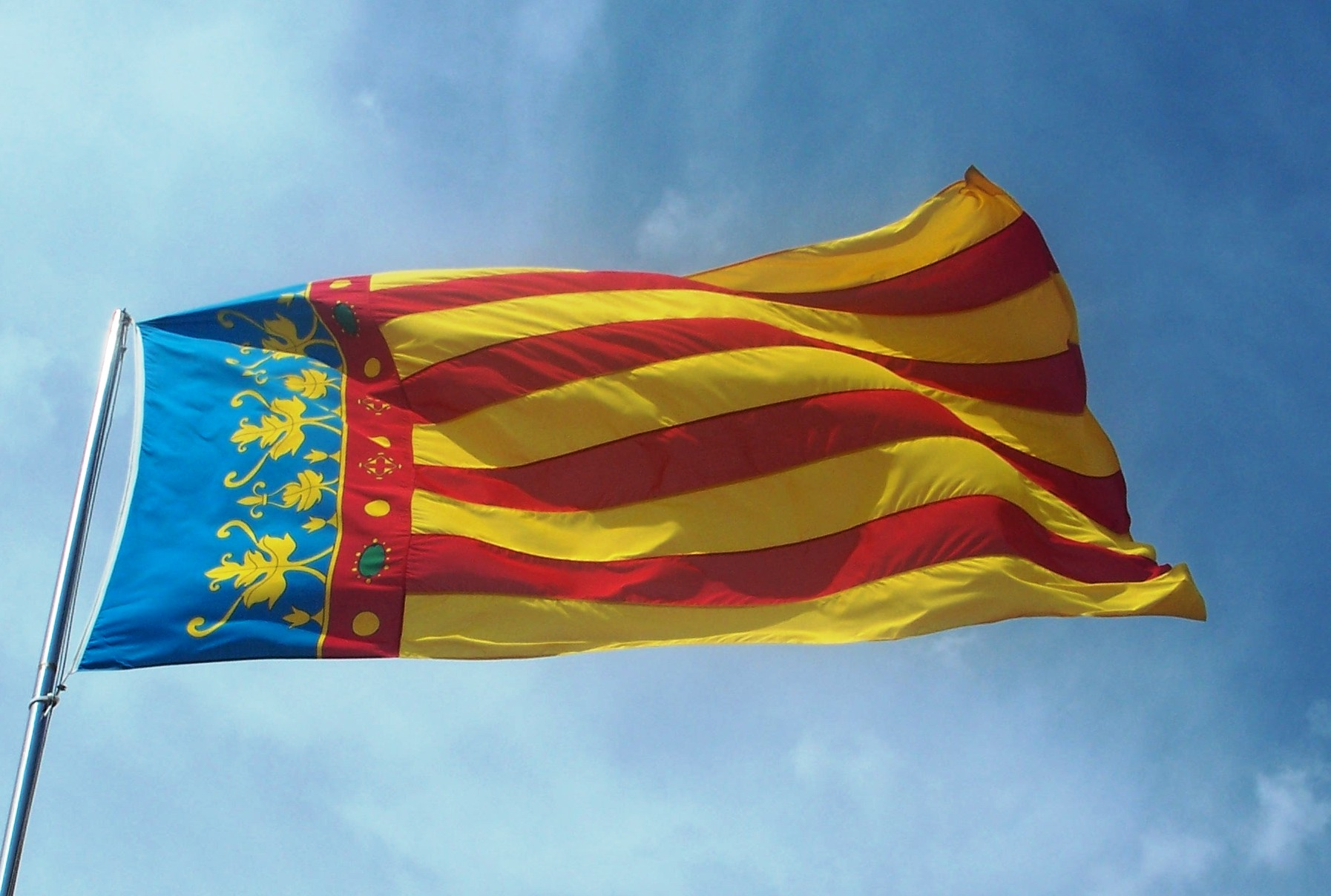
Another senyera hoisted at Tower of Serrans

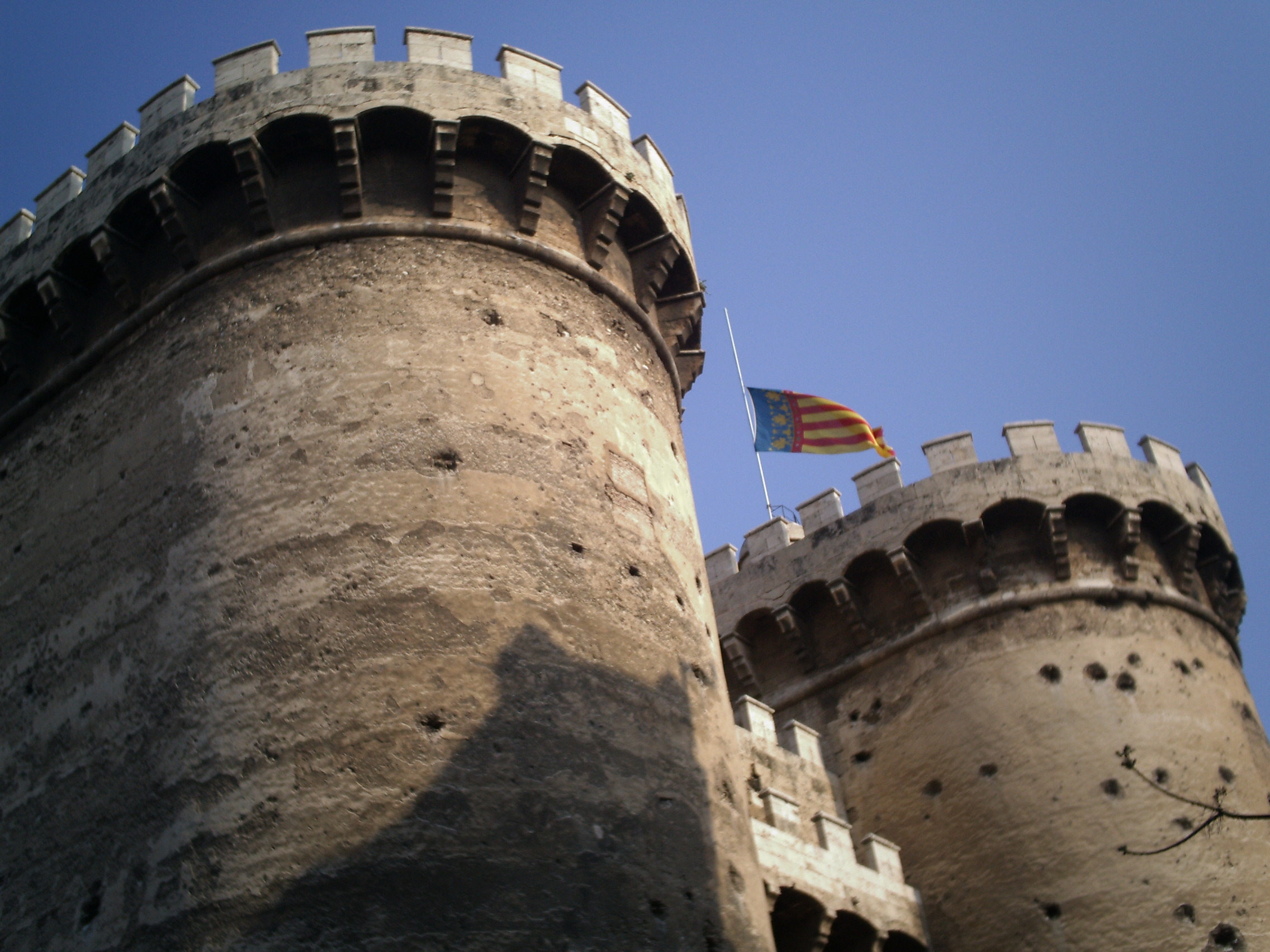
At top of Torres de Quart (Valencia)

== Flag protocol ==
The flag of Valencia is to be hoisted both outside and inside of each and every public and civil building of the Valencian Community, without endangering the prominence and most honorable place of the Flag of Spain. It has to be hoisted at the right of the National flag (left from viewer's point). The Flag of Valencia should not be larger than the Flag of Spain nor smaller than the flags of other entities.

== See also ==
- Coat of arms of the Valencian Community
- Flags of the autonomous communities of Spain
