= 2003 Spanish local elections in the Valencian Community =

This article presents the results breakdown of the local elections held in the Valencian Community on 25 May 2003. The following tables show detailed results in the autonomous community's most populous municipalities, sorted alphabetically.

== City control ==
The following table lists party control in the most populous municipalities, including provincial capitals (highlighted in bold). Gains for a party are highlighted in that party's colour.

Municipality	Population	Previous control	New control
Alcoy	60,465	People's Party (PP)	People's Party (PP)
**Alicante**	293,629	People's Party (PP)	People's Party (PP)
Benidorm	61,352	People's Party (PP)	People's Party (PP)
**Castellón de la Plana**	153,225	People's Party (PP)	People's Party (PP)
Elche	201,731	Socialist Party of the Valencian Country (PSPV–PSOE)	Socialist Party of the Valencian Country (PSPV–PSOE)
Elda	53,103	Socialist Party of the Valencian Country (PSPV–PSOE)	Socialist Party of the Valencian Country (PSPV–PSOE)
Gandia	62,280	Socialist Party of the Valencian Country (PSPV–PSOE)	Socialist Party of the Valencian Country (PSPV–PSOE)
Orihuela	61,018	People's Party (PP)	People's Party (PP)
Paterna	48,367	Socialist Party of the Valencian Country (PSPV–PSOE)	Socialist Party of the Valencian Country (PSPV–PSOE)
Sagunto	57,741	People's Party (PP)	Socialist Party of the Valencian Country (PSPV–PSOE)
Torrent	67,393	Socialist Party of the Valencian Country (PSPV–PSOE)	Socialist Party of the Valencian Country (PSPV–PSOE)
Torrevieja	69,763	People's Party (PP)	People's Party (PP)
**Valencia**	761,871	People's Party (PP)	People's Party (PP)

== Municipalities ==
=== Alcoy ===
Population: 60,465

← Summary of the 25 May 2003 City Council of Alcoy election results →
Parties and alliances	Popular vote			Seats	
Parties and alliances	Votes	%	±pp	Total	+/−
People's Party (PP)	16,226	46.89	+5.68	13	+1
Socialist Party of the Valencian Country (PSPV–PSOE)^{1}	10,034	28.99	−8.18	8	−3
United Left–The Greens–Valencian Left: Agreement (Entesa)	4,258	12.30	+2.92	3	+1
Valencian Nationalist Bloc (Bloc)	2,100	6.07	+1.62	1	+1
Party of Alcoy (PALC)	1,029	2.97	New	0	±0
Independent Initiative (II)	176	0.51	−1.09	0	±0
Units for Alcoy (UniPA)	132	0.38	New	0	±0
Another Democracy is Possible (ODeP)	92	0.27	New	0	±0
Blank ballots	561	1.62	−0.47		
Total	34,608			25	±0
Valid votes	34,608	99.35	−0.02		
Invalid votes	228	0.65	+0.02		
Votes cast / turnout	34,836	69.89	+2.17		
Abstentions	15,011	30.11	−2.17		
Registered voters	49,847				
Sources
Footnotes: ^{1} Socialist Party of the Valencian Country results are compared to Democratic Party of the New Left totals in the 1999 election.

=== Alicante ===
Population: 293,629

← Summary of the 25 May 2003 City Council of Alicante election results →
Parties and alliances	Popular vote			Seats	
Parties and alliances	Votes	%	±pp	Total	+/−
People's Party (PP)	69,574	47.77	−1.32	14	−1
Socialist Party of the Valencian Country (PSPV–PSOE)	55,783	38.30	+1.43	12	+1
United Left–The Greens–Valencian Left: Agreement (Entesa)	9,259	6.36	+0.15	1	±0
Valencian Nationalist Bloc–Green Left (Bloc–EV)	4,206	2.89	+0.31	0	±0
The Eco-pacifist Greens (LVEP)	1,958	1.34	+0.46	0	±0
Liberal Centrist Union (UCL)	537	0.37	New	0	±0
Communist Party of the Peoples of Spain (PCPE)	373	0.26	+0.02	0	±0
National Democracy (DN)	306	0.21	New	0	±0
Authentic Phalanx (FA)	299	0.21	New	0	±0
Humanist Party (PH)	220	0.15	+0.05	0	±0
Blank ballots	3,115	2.14	−0.17		
Total	145,630			27	±0
Valid votes	145,630	99.48	+0.08		
Invalid votes	764	0.52	−0.08		
Votes cast / turnout	146,394	62.09	+4.68		
Abstentions	89,376	37.91	−4.68		
Registered voters	235,770				

=== Benidorm ===
Population: 61,352

← Summary of the 25 May 2003 City Council of Benidorm election results →
Parties and alliances	Popular vote			Seats	
Parties and alliances	Votes	%	±pp	Total	+/−
People's Party (PP)	12,292	46.04	−2.51	14	±0
Socialist Party of the Valencian Country (PSPV–PSOE)	10,536	39.47	+2.70	11	±0
Benidorm Initiative–Bloc (IB–Bloc)	908	3.40	−0.29	0	±0
United Left–Valencian Left: Agreement (Entesa)	880	3.30	−1.61	0	±0
Party of Benidorm (PdB)	874	3.27	New	0	±0
The Greens (EV/LV)	385	1.44	+0.39	0	±0
Marina Baixa Progressive Left (IPMB)	284	1.06	New	0	±0
Democratic and Social Centre (CDS)	104	0.39	New	0	±0
Union–Liberal Centrist Union (U–UCL)^{1}	65	0.24	−0.66	0	±0
Blank ballots	369	1.38	−0.43		
Total	26,697			25	±0
Valid votes	26,697	99.56	+0.60		
Invalid votes	118	0.44	−0.60		
Votes cast / turnout	26,815	61.97	+3.69		
Abstentions	16,455	38.03	−3.69		
Registered voters	43,270				
Sources
Footnotes: ^{1} Union–Liberal Centrist Union results are compared to Valencian Union totals in the 1999 election.

=== Castellón de la Plana ===
Population: 153,225

← Summary of the 25 May 2003 City Council of Castellón de la Plana election results →
Parties and alliances	Popular vote			Seats	
Parties and alliances	Votes	%	±pp	Total	+/−
People's Party (PP)	37,968	49.16	−4.39	15	−1
Socialist Party of the Valencian Country (PSPV–PSOE)	26,977	34.93	+3.34	10	±0
Valencian Nationalist Bloc–Green Left (Bloc–EV)	5,111	6.62	+1.11	2	+1
United Left–The Greens–Valencian Left: Agreement (Entesa)	3,175	4.11	−0.22	0	±0
Union–Valencian Community Union for Castellón (Unió–Unión)	1,707	2.21	+0.20	0	±0
Republican Left of the Valencian Country–Municipal Agreement (ERPV–AM)	583	0.75	±0.00	0	±0
Humanist Party (PH)	193	0.25	+0.04	0	±0
Blank ballots	1,515	1.96	−0.09		
Total	77,229			27	±0
Valid votes	77,229	99.50	+0.25		
Invalid votes	385	0.50	−0.25		
Votes cast / turnout	77,614	65.10	+2.38		
Abstentions	41,600	34.90	−2.38		
Registered voters	119,214				

=== Elche ===
Population: 201,731

← Summary of the 25 May 2003 City Council of Elche election results →
Parties and alliances	Popular vote			Seats	
Parties and alliances	Votes	%	±pp	Total	+/−
Socialist Party of the Valencian Country (PSPV–PSOE)	53,604	52.08	+3.96	15	+1
People's Party (PP)	37,752	36.68	−2.56	11	−1
United Left–The Greens–Valencian Left: Agreement (Entesa)	6,332	6.15	+0.94	1	±0
Valencian Nationalist Bloc–Green Left (Bloc–EV)	1,626	1.58	−0.19	0	±0
Liberal Centrist Union (UCL)	1,086	1.06	New	0	±0
Humanist Party (PH)	528	0.51	+0.13	0	±0
Movement for People's Unity (MUP)	492	0.48	New	0	±0
Blank ballots	1,515	1.47	+0.12		
Total	102,935			27	±0
Valid votes	102,935	99.46	+0.06		
Invalid votes	554	0.54	−0.06		
Votes cast / turnout	103,489	64.83	+1.63		
Abstentions	56,143	35.17	−1.63		
Registered voters	159,632				

=== Elda ===
Population: 53,103

← Summary of the 25 May 2003 City Council of Elda election results →
Parties and alliances	Popular vote			Seats	
Parties and alliances	Votes	%	±pp	Total	+/−
Socialist Party of the Valencian Country (PSPV–PSOE)	11,536	40.24	−6.83	11	−2
People's Party (PP)	11,103	38.73	+1.38	10	±0
Union for Elda Progress (UPElda)	2,818	9.83	+3.07	2	+1
United Left–Valencian Left: Agreement (Entesa)	2,157	7.52	+1.83	2	+1
The Eco-pacifist Greens (LVEP)	556	1.94	New	0	±0
Blank ballots	501	1.75	−0.34		
Total	28,671			25	±0
Valid votes	28,671	99.30	−0.10		
Invalid votes	201	0.70	+0.10		
Votes cast / turnout	28,872	65.64	+2.54		
Abstentions	15,115	34.36	−2.54		
Registered voters	43,987				

=== Gandia ===
Population: 62,280

← Summary of the 25 May 2003 City Council of Gandia election results →
Parties and alliances	Popular vote			Seats	
Parties and alliances	Votes	%	±pp	Total	+/−
People's Party (PP)	15,384	43.26	+4.07	12	+1
Socialist Party of the Valencian Country (PSPV–PSOE)	13,406	37.70	−3.00	10	−2
Valencian Nationalist Bloc–Green Left (Bloc–EV)	3,999	11.25	+3.97	3	+1
Valencian Union (UV)	1,218	3.43	−0.69	0	±0
United Left–The Greens–Valencian Left: Agreement (Entesa)	1,057	2.97	−1.24	0	±0
Blank ballots	496	1.39	−0.10		
Total	35,560			25	±0
Valid votes	35,560	99.52	+0.52		
Invalid votes	173	0.48	−0.52		
Votes cast / turnout	35,733	72.75	+3.04		
Abstentions	13,382	27.25	−3.04		
Registered voters	49,115				

=== Orihuela ===
Population: 61,018

← Summary of the 25 May 2003 City Council of Orihuela election results →
Parties and alliances	Popular vote			Seats	
Parties and alliances	Votes	%	±pp	Total	+/−
People's Party (PP)	15,276	51.23	+0.57	14	−1
Union–Liberal Centrist Union (U–UCL)^{1}	6,317	21.18	+17.75	6	+6
Socialist Party of the Valencian Country (PSPV–PSOE)	4,554	15.27	−4.90	4	−1
Green Left–Bloc (IV–Bloc)	1,749	5.86	New	1	+1
United Left–Valencian Left: Agreement (Entesa)	989	3.32	−1.59	0	±0
Workers' Unitary League (LUT)	261	0.88	New	0	±0
Movement for People's Unity–Alternative Left Bloc (MUP–BIA)	213	0.71	New	0	±0
Liberal Centre (CL)	n/a	n/a	−18.13	0	−5
Blank ballots	462	1.55	−0.35		
Total	29,821			25	±0
Valid votes	29,821	99.34	+0.54		
Invalid votes	198	0.66	−0.54		
Votes cast / turnout	30,019	73.07	−0.22		
Abstentions	11,064	26.93	+0.22		
Registered voters	41,083				
Sources
Footnotes: ^{1} Union–Liberal Centrist Union results are compared to Valencian Union totals in the 1999 election.

=== Paterna ===
Population: 48,367

← Summary of the 25 May 2003 City Council of Paterna election results →
Parties and alliances	Popular vote			Seats	
Parties and alliances	Votes	%	±pp	Total	+/−
Socialist Party of the Valencian Country (PSPV–PSOE)	10,682	42.26	+4.07	10	+1
People's Party (PP)	9,087	35.95	−2.23	8	−1
United Left–Valencian Left: Agreement (Entesa)	2,062	8.16	−1.55	2	±0
Valencian Union (UV)	1,381	5.46	−2.08	1	±0
Valencian Nationalist Bloc–Green Left (Bloc–EV)	719	2.84	−1.56	0	±0
The Greens (EV/LV)	595	2.35	New	0	±0
Party of Paterna (PDP)	300	1.19	New	0	±0
Spain 2000 (E–2000)	104	0.41	New	0	±0
Blank ballots	345	1.36	−0.62		
Total	25,275			21	±0
Valid votes	25,275	99.49	+0.53		
Invalid votes	129	0.51	−0.53		
Votes cast / turnout	25,404	65.09	+6.03		
Abstentions	13,623	34.91	−6.03		
Registered voters	39,027				

=== Sagunto ===
Population: 57,741

← Summary of the 25 May 2003 City Council of Sagunto election results →
Parties and alliances	Popular vote			Seats	
Parties and alliances	Votes	%	±pp	Total	+/−
People's Party (PP)	8,846	28.28	+1.82	8	±0
Socialist Party of the Valencian Country (PSPV–PSOE)	7,859	25.12	+0.35	7	±0
United Left–Valencian Left: Agreement (Entesa)	4,380	14.00	+9.99	4	+4
Portenian Segregation (SP)	3,809	12.18	−3.29	3	−1
Valencian Nationalist Bloc–Green Left (Bloc–EV)	2,357	7.54	−1.80	2	−1
Sagunto and Port Centrists (SCP)	1,953	6.24	New	1	+1
Valencian Union (UV)	866	2.77	−8.32	0	−3
Independent Social Democratic Party of the Valencian Community (PSICV)	651	2.08	New	0	±0
Social Transformation Political Party (PTS)	77	0.25	New	0	±0
Blank ballots	482	1.54	−2.73		
Total	31,280			25	±0
Valid votes	31,280	99.37	+0.34		
Invalid votes	197	0.63	−0.34		
Votes cast / turnout	31,477	63.82	+5.71		
Abstentions	17,841	36.18	−5.71		
Registered voters	49,318				

=== Torrent ===
Population: 67,393

← Summary of the 25 May 2003 City Council of Torrent election results →
Parties and alliances	Popular vote			Seats	
Parties and alliances	Votes	%	±pp	Total	+/−
Socialist Party of the Valencian Country (PSPV–PSOE)	19,351	55.76	+9.08	15	+2
People's Party (PP)	10,121	29.16	−6.37	8	−2
Valencian Union (UV)	1,808	5.21	−2.19	1	−1
Valencian Nationalist Bloc–Green Left (Bloc–EV)	1,757	5.06	+0.69	1	+1
United Left–Valencian Left: Agreement (Entesa)	1,241	3.58	−0.88	0	±0
Blank ballots	425	1.22	−0.34		
Total	34,703			25	±0
Valid votes	34,703	99.69	+0.36		
Invalid votes	107	0.31	−0.36		
Votes cast / turnout	34,810	63.89	+3.72		
Abstentions	19,672	36.11	−3.72		
Registered voters	54,482				

=== Torrevieja ===
Population: 69,763

← Summary of the 25 May 2003 City Council of Torrevieja election results →
Parties and alliances	Popular vote			Seats	
Parties and alliances	Votes	%	±pp	Total	+/−
People's Party (PP)	11,738	54.23	−8.85	15	+1
Socialist Party of the Valencian Country (PSPV–PSOE)	6,856	31.68	+3.03	8	+2
Green Left–Valencian Nationalist Bloc (IV–Bloc)	1,183	5.47	New	1	+1
United Left–Valencian Left: Agreement (Entesa)	1,162	5.37	−0.66	1	±0
Union–Liberal Centrist Union (U–UCL)	398	1.84	New	0	±0
Authentic Phalanx (FA)	81	0.37	New	0	±0
Blank ballots	225	1.04	−0.30		
Total	21,643			25	+4
Valid votes	21,643	99.29	+0.58		
Invalid votes	155	0.71	−0.58		
Votes cast / turnout	21,798	54.74	−3.92		
Abstentions	18,021	45.26	+3.92		
Registered voters	39,819				

=== Valencia ===
Population: 761,871

== See also ==
- 2003 Valencian regional election
