= Union of Valencia =

Anti-royalist movement in the Kingdom of Valencia from 1283 to the 15th century

The Union of Valencia (Spanish: Unión de Valencia, Catalan: Unió de València) was an anti-royalist movement in the Kingdom of Valencia begun in 1283 and lasting into the fifteenth century. The Union was formed in the aftermath of the formation of the Union of Aragon in October 1283. Its essential purpose was as a tool of the Valencian nobility to be used against the influence of Catalans and foreigners on the actions of the Crown. By 1285 the Unions had severely curtailed the powers of the king and were hindering his efforts in the War of the Sicilian Vespers and against the Aragonese Crusade that invaded Catalonia that year.

In 1347 during the cortes of Zaragoza, the Union of Valencia allied with that of Aragon and demanded the right to appoint a Justícia in Valencia like the Aragonese Unidos had. They then successfully besieged the royalist castle of Xàtiva. The Union persuaded Ferdinand, Prince of Aragon to be their lieutenant-general and, with an army of 30,000, he dealt the royalists a second defeat. Then Peter IV went from Barcelona to Valencia to negotiate with the leaders of the Union. The Aragonese union sent a troop of reinforcements, around 20,000, to Ferdinand. Peter offered to declare Ferdinand his heir, but negotiations broke down. Peter was briefly imprisoned in Morvedre in early 1348; only the arrival of the Black Death forced his release. When he had again obtained the upper hand, Peter ordered the "great bell" that had been used to rally the Unidos to be melted and its liquor poured down the throats of the Union's leaders. Peter was even implicated in the death (by poisoning) of his brother James I, Count of Urgell, that year; James had been a supporter of the Union. On 1 November 1348, the Union attacked the Jews of Morvedre because they, being by law serfs of the Crown, were considered de jure royalists.

In 1401 King Martin granted the Union the right to use the royal flag, the senyera (actually a likeness of the penó de la conquesta), with the Union symbol on it.

== Sources ==
- Durham, Samuel Astley. History of Spain and Portugal. Harper & Brothers, 1854.
- Fowler, Kenneth Alan. The Great Companies. Oxford: Blackwell Publishing, 2001. ISBN 0-631-15886-3.
- Holmes, George. Europe: Hierarchy and Revolt, 1320–1450. Oxford: Blackwell Publishing, 2000. ISBN 0-631-21382-1.
- Meyerson, Mark D. "Victims and Players: The Attack of the Union of Valencia on the Jews of Morvedre" (pp. 70–102) in: Religion, Text, and Society in Medieval Spain and Northern Europe: Essays in Honour of J. N. Hillgarth, edd. T. Burman, M. D. Meyerson, and L. Shopkow. Toronto: University of Toronto Press, 2002.
- Meyerson, Mark D. Jews in an Iberian Frontier Kingdom: Society, Economy, and Politics in Morvedre, 1248–1391. BRILL, 2004. ISBN 90-04-13739-4.
- Mott, Lawrence V. "Serving in the Fleet: Crews and Recruitment Issues in the Catalan-Aragonese Fleets During the War of Sicilian Vespers (1282–1302)" in: Medieval Encounters, Vol. 13, Iss. 1 (April, 2007), pp. 56–.
- Reilly, Bernard F. The Medieval Spains. Cambridge: Cambridge University Press, 1993. ISBN 0-521-39741-3.
