= 2007 Spanish local elections in the Valencian Community =

This article presents the results breakdown of the local elections held in the Valencian Community on 27 May 2007. The following tables show detailed results in the autonomous community's most populous municipalities, sorted alphabetically.

== City control ==
The following table lists party control in the most populous municipalities, including provincial capitals (shown in bold). Gains for a party are displayed with the cell's background shaded in that party's colour.

Municipality	Population	Previous control	New control
Alcoy	60,590	People's Party (PP)	People's Party (PP)
**Alicante**	322,431	People's Party (PP)	People's Party (PP)
Benidorm	67,627	People's Party (PP)	People's Party (PP) (PSOE in 2009)
**Castellón de la Plana**	172,110	People's Party (PP)	People's Party (PP)
Elche	219,032	Socialist Party of the Valencian Country (PSPV–PSOE)	Socialist Party of the Valencian Country (PSPV–PSOE)
Elda	55,138	Socialist Party of the Valencian Country (PSPV–PSOE)	People's Party (PP)
Gandia	74,827	Socialist Party of the Valencian Country (PSPV–PSOE)	Socialist Party of the Valencian Country (PSPV–PSOE)
Orihuela	77,979	People's Party (PP)	People's Party (PP)
Paterna	57,343	Socialist Party of the Valencian Country (PSPV–PSOE)	People's Party (PP)
Sagunto	62,702	Socialist Party of the Valencian Country (PSPV–PSOE)	People's Party (PP)
Torrent	74,616	Socialist Party of the Valencian Country (PSPV–PSOE)	People's Party (PP)
Torrevieja	92,034	People's Party (PP)	People's Party (PP)
**Valencia**	805,304	People's Party (PP)	People's Party (PP)

== Municipalities ==
=== Alcoy ===
Population: 60,590

← Summary of the 27 May 2007 City Council of Alcoy election results →
Parties and alliances	Popular vote			Seats	
Parties and alliances	Votes	%	±pp	Total	+/−
People's Party (PP)	16,792	49.97	+3.08	13	±0
Socialist Party of the Valencian Country (PSPV–PSOE)	10,985	32.69	+3.70	9	+1
Valencian Nationalist Bloc (Bloc)	2,420	7.20	+1.13	2	+1
United Left–Agreement for Alcoy–The Greens–Republican Left (EU–EpA–EV–IR)	2,363	7.03	−5.27	1	−2
Republican Left of the Valencian Country–Municipal Agreement (ERPV–AM)	238	0.71	New	0	±0
Valencian Coalition (CVa)	198	0.59	New	0	±0
Social Democratic Party (PSD)	110	0.33	New	0	±0
Blank ballots	500	1.49	−0.13		
Total	33,606			25	±0
Valid votes	33,606	99.50	+0.15		
Invalid votes	170	0.50	−0.15		
Votes cast / turnout	33,776	69.00	−0.89		
Abstentions	15,178	31.00	+0.89		
Registered voters	48,954				

=== Alicante ===
Population: 322,431

← Summary of the 27 May 2007 City Council of Alicante election results →
Parties and alliances	Popular vote			Seats	
Parties and alliances	Votes	%	±pp	Total	+/−
People's Party (PP)	63,695	44.15	−3.62	15	+1
Socialist Party of the Valencian Country (PSPV–PSOE)	59,625	41.33	+3.03	14	+2
United Left–The Greens–Republican Left: Municipal Agreement (EU–EV–IR)	7,014	4.86	−1.50	0	−1
Neighbours for Alicante (VA)	4,659	3.23	New	0	±0
Citizens–Party of the Citizenry (C's)	2,060	1.43	New	0	±0
Valencian Nationalist Bloc–The Greens Ecologist Left (Bloc–EVEE)	1,663	1.15	−1.74	0	±0
The Eco-pacifist Greens–Citizens for Alicante (LVEP–CA)	1,166	0.81	−0.53	0	±0
Social Democratic Party (PSD)	408	0.28	New	0	±0
Authentic Phalanx (FA)	307	0.21	±0.00	0	±0
For a Fairer World (PUM+J)	294	0.20	New	0	±0
Republican Left of the Valencian Country–Municipal Agreement (ERPV–AM)	260	0.18	New	0	±0
Communist Party of the Peoples of Spain (PCPE)	248	0.17	−0.09	0	±0
Valencian Coalition–Spanish Democratic Party (CVa–PADE)	182	0.13	New	0	±0
Humanist Party (PH)	97	0.07	−0.08	0	±0
Liberal Democratic Centre (CDL)	89	0.06	New	0	±0
Movement for People's Unity–Republicans (MUP–R)	57	0.04	New	0	±0
Centrists National Organization (ONC)	34	0.02	New	0	±0
Blank ballots	2,423	1.68	−0.46		
Total	144,281			29	+2
Valid votes	144,281	99.55	+0.07		
Invalid votes	647	0.45	−0.07		
Votes cast / turnout	144,928	60.25	−1.84		
Abstentions	95,626	39.75	+1.84		
Registered voters	240,554				

=== Benidorm ===
Population: 67,627

← Summary of the 27 May 2007 City Council of Benidorm election results →
Parties and alliances	Popular vote			Seats	
Parties and alliances	Votes	%	±pp	Total	+/−
People's Party (PP)	12,487	48.41	+2.37	13	−1
Socialist Party of the Valencian Country (PSPV–PSOE)	11,127	43.14	+3.67	12	+1
Valencian Nationalist Bloc (Bloc)	572	2.22	−1.18	0	±0
United Left–The Greens–Republican Left: Municipal Agreement (EUPV–V–IR)	420	1.63	−1.67	0	±0
Social Democratic Party (PSD)	296	1.15	New	0	±0
Citizens for Benidorm (CpB)	230	0.89	New	0	±0
Spain 2000 (E–2000)	188	0.73	New	0	±0
Republican Left of the Valencian Country–Municipal Agreement (ERPV–AM)	69	0.27	New	0	±0
Alternative Left Bloc (BIA)	36	0.14	New	0	±0
Independent Initiative (II)	21	0.08	New	0	±0
Spanish Phalanx of the CNSO (FE de las JONS)	20	0.08	New	0	±0
Blank ballots	329	1.28	−0.10		
Total	25,795			25	±0
Valid votes	25,795	99.28	−0.28		
Invalid votes	187	0.72	+0.28		
Votes cast / turnout	25,982	60.83	−1.14		
Abstentions	16,732	39.17	+1.14		
Registered voters	42,714				

=== Castellón de la Plana ===
Population: 172,110

← Summary of the 27 May 2007 City Council of Castellón de la Plana election results →
Parties and alliances	Popular vote			Seats	
Parties and alliances	Votes	%	±pp	Total	+/−
People's Party (PP)	36,168	47.91	−1.25	14	−1
Socialist Party of the Valencian Country (PSPV–PSOE)	29,170	38.64	+3.71	12	+2
Valencian Nationalist Bloc (Bloc)	3,911	5.18	−1.44	1	−1
United Left–Greens–PCPE–Republican Left (EUPV–V–PCPE–IR)	2,707	3.59	−0.52	0	±0
Spain 2000 (E–2000)	755	1.00	New	0	±0
Republican Left of the Valencian Country–Municipal Agreement (ERPV–AM)	388	0.51	−0.24	0	±0
Valencian Union–The Eco-pacifist Greens (UV–LVEP)	289	0.38	New	0	±0
Social Democratic Party (PSD)	235	0.31	New	0	±0
Valencian Coalition (CVa)	214	0.28	New	0	±0
Humanist Party (PH)	132	0.17	−0.08	0	±0
Social Democratic Union (UDS)	60	0.08	New	0	±0
Blank ballots	1,461	1.94	−0.02		
Total	75,490			27	±0
Valid votes	75,490	99.38	−0.12		
Invalid votes	468	0.62	+0.12		
Votes cast / turnout	75,958	62.39	−2.71		
Abstentions	45,795	37.61	+2.71		
Registered voters	121,753				

=== Elche ===
Population: 219,032

← Summary of the 27 May 2007 City Council of Elche election results →
Parties and alliances	Popular vote			Seats	
Parties and alliances	Votes	%	±pp	Total	+/−
Socialist Party of the Valencian Country (PSPV–PSOE)	43,595	42.02	−10.06	13	−2
People's Party (PP)	43,483	41.91	+5.23	13	+2
United Left–Bloc for Elche–The Greens–Republican Left (EU–BpE–EV–IR)^{1}	6,512	6.28	−1.45	1	±0
Party of Elche (Partido de Elche/Partit d'Elx)	4,186	4.03	New	0	±0
Popular Group of Torrellano and El Altet (APTA)	2,706	2.61	New	0	±0
Movement for People's Unity–Republicans (MUP–R)	502	0.48	−0.03	0	±0
Humanist Party (PH)	393	0.38	−0.13	0	±0
Social Democratic Party (PSD)	339	0.33	New	0	±0
Republican Left of the Valencian Country–Municipal Agreement (ERPV–AM)	274	0.26	New	0	±0
Communist Party of the Peoples of Spain (PCPE)	183	0.18	New	0	±0
Valencian Coalition (CVa)	97	0.09	New	0	±0
Blank ballots	1,490	1.44	−0.03		
Total	103,760			27	±0
Valid votes	103,760	99.55	+0.09		
Invalid votes	471	0.45	−0.09		
Votes cast / turnout	104,231	62.85	−1.98		
Abstentions	61,609	37.15	+1.98		
Registered voters	165,840				
Sources
Footnotes: ^{1} United Left–Bloc for Elche–The Greens–Republican Left results are compared to the combined totals of United Left–The Greens–Valencian Left: Agreement and Valencian Nationalist Bloc–Green Left in the 2003 election.

=== Elda ===
Population: 55,138

← Summary of the 27 May 2007 City Council of Elda election results →
Parties and alliances	Popular vote			Seats	
Parties and alliances	Votes	%	±pp	Total	+/−
People's Party (PP)	12,674	45.30	+6.57	13	+3
Socialist Party of the Valencian Country (PSPV–PSOE)	9,276	33.16	−7.08	9	−2
United Left–The Greens–Republican Left: Municipal Agreement (EUPV–V–IR)	2,245	8.02	+0.50	2	±0
Liberal Centrist Union (UCL)	1,647	5.89	New	1	+1
Union for Elda Progress (UPElda)	879	3.14	−6.69	0	−2
Eldensan Future Platform (PDFE)	319	1.14	New	0	±0
Social Democratic Party (PSD)	181	0.65	New	0	±0
Blank ballots	755	2.70	+0.95		
Total	27,976			25	±0
Valid votes	27,976	99.40	+0.10		
Invalid votes	168	0.60	−0.10		
Votes cast / turnout	28,144	65.41	−0.23		
Abstentions	14,885	34.59	+0.23		
Registered voters	43,029				

=== Gandia ===
Population: 74,827

← Summary of the 27 May 2007 City Council of Gandia election results →
Parties and alliances	Popular vote			Seats	
Parties and alliances	Votes	%	±pp	Total	+/−
Socialist Party of the Valencian Country (PSPV–PSOE)	14,745	40.88	+3.18	12	+2
People's Party (PP)	11,482	31.83	−11.43	9	−3
Platform of Gandia (PdG)	3,391	9.40	New	2	+2
Valencian Nationalist Bloc–The Greens Ecologist Left (Bloc–EVEE)	2,597	7.20	−4.05	2	−1
Valencian Coalition–Valencian Independent Group (CVa–GIVAL)	1,122	3.11	New	0	±0
The Greens of the Valencian Country (EVPV)	1,024	2.84	New	0	±0
Spain 2000 (E–2000)	446	1.24	New	0	±0
United Left–Republican Left: Agreement for Gandia (EUPV–IR)	402	1.11	−1.86	0	±0
Republican Left of the Valencian Country–Municipal Agreement (ERPV–AM)	135	0.37	New	0	±0
Valencian Union–The Eco-pacifist Greens (UV–LVEP)	122	0.34	−3.09	0	±0
European United Citizens Party (PCUE)	108	0.30	New	0	±0
Social Democratic Party (PSD)	71	0.20	New	0	±0
Liberal Centrist Union (UCL)	20	0.06	New	0	±0
Blank ballots	405	1.12	−0.27		
Total	36,070			25	±0
Valid votes	36,070	99.54	+0.02		
Invalid votes	168	0.46	−0.02		
Votes cast / turnout	36,238	70.71	−2.04		
Abstentions	15,008	29.29	+2.04		
Registered voters	51,246				

=== Orihuela ===
Population: 77,979

← Summary of the 27 May 2007 City Council of Orihuela election results →
Parties and alliances	Popular vote			Seats	
Parties and alliances	Votes	%	±pp	Total	+/−
People's Party (PP)	14,113	44.75	−6.48	14	±0
Socialist Party of the Valencian Country (PSPV–PSOE)	7,114	22.56	+7.29	7	+3
The Greens of the Valencian Country (EVPV)^{1}	2,851	9.04	+3.18	3	+2
Renewal Liberal Centre (CLR)	1,881	5.96	New	1	+1
Liberal Centre (CL)	1,423	4.51	New	0	±0
Alternative for Orihuela (ApOR)	1,169	3.71	New	0	±0
Social Democratic Party (PSD)	1,135	3.60	New	0	±0
Clear (CLARO)	914	2.90	New	0	±0
United Left–Republican Left: Municipal Agreement (EU–IR)	417	1.32	−2.00	0	±0
Alternative Left Bloc (BIA)^{2}	109	0.35	−0.36	0	±0
Union–Liberal Centrist Union (U–UCL)	n/a	n/a	−21.18	0	−6
Blank ballots	414	1.31	−0.24		
Total	31,540			25	±0
Valid votes	31,540	99.35	+0.01		
Invalid votes	206	0.65	−0.01		
Votes cast / turnout	31,746	71.93	−1.14		
Abstentions	12,391	28.07	+1.14		
Registered voters	44,137				
Sources
Footnotes: ^{1} The Greens of the Valencian Country results are compared to Green Left–Bloc totals in the 2003 election.; ^{2} Alternative Left Bloc results are compared to Movement for People's Unity–Alternative Left Bloc totals in the 2003 election.

=== Paterna ===
Population: 57,343

← Summary of the 27 May 2007 City Council of Paterna election results →
Parties and alliances	Popular vote			Seats	
Parties and alliances	Votes	%	±pp	Total	+/−
People's Party (PP)	15,194	53.54	+17.59	15	+7
Socialist Party of the Valencian Country (PSPV–PSOE)	8,680	30.58	−11.68	8	−2
United Left–Bloc for Paterna–The Greens–Republican Left (EUPV–Bloc–V–IR)^{1}	2,677	9.43	−3.92	2	±0
Valencian Union–The Eco-pacifist Greens (UV–LVEP)	911	3.21	−2.25	0	−1
Social Democratic Party (PSD)	224	0.79	New	0	±0
Valencian Coalition (CVa)	155	0.55	New	0	±0
Republican Left of the Valencian Country–Municipal Agreement (ERPV–AM)	109	0.38	New	0	±0
Blank ballots	431	1.52	+–0.16		
Total	28,381			25	+4
Valid votes	28,381	99.54	+0.05		
Invalid votes	130	0.46	−0.05		
Votes cast / turnout	28,511	64.16	−0.93		
Abstentions	15,924	35.84	+0.93		
Registered voters	44,435				
Sources
Footnotes: ^{1} United Left–Bloc for Paterna–The Greens–Republican Left to the combined totals of United Left–Valencian Left: Agreement, Valencian Nationalist Bloc–Green Left and The Greens in the 2003 election.

=== Sagunto ===
Population: 62,702

← Summary of the 27 May 2007 City Council of Sagunto election results →
Parties and alliances	Popular vote			Seats	
Parties and alliances	Votes	%	±pp	Total	+/−
People's Party (PP)^{1}	10,126	32.19	−2.33	9	±0
Socialist Party of the Valencian Country (PSPV–PSOE)	7,580	24.09	−1.03	6	−1
Portenian Segregation (SP)	6,688	21.26	+9.08	6	+3
Valencian Nationalist Bloc (Bloc)	3,234	10.28	+2.74	2	±0
United Left–The Greens–Republican Left: Municipal Agreement (EUPV–V–IR)	2,820	8.96	−5.04	2	−2
Republican Left of the Valencian Country–Municipal Agreement (ERPV–AM)	284	0.90	New	0	±0
Valencian Coalition (CVa)	106	0.34	New	0	±0
Social Democratic Party (PSD)	70	0.22	New	0	±0
Blank ballots	552	1.75	+0.21		
Total	31,460			25	±0
Valid votes	31,460	99.52	+0.15		
Invalid votes	151	0.48	−0.15		
Votes cast / turnout	31,611	62.78	−1.04		
Abstentions	18,742	37.22	+1.04		
Registered voters	50,353				
Sources
Footnotes: ^{1} People's Party results are compared to the combined totals of People's Party and Sagunto and Port Centrists in the 2003 election.

=== Torrent ===
Population: 74,616

← Summary of the 27 May 2007 City Council of Torrent election results →
Parties and alliances	Popular vote			Seats	
Parties and alliances	Votes	%	±pp	Total	+/−
People's Party (PP)	15,250	43.80	+14.64	13	+5
Socialist Party of the Valencian Country (PSPV–PSOE)	13,909	39.95	−15.81	11	−4
Bloc–Greens–Platform for the Hospital (Bloc–Verds–PpH)	1,852	5.32	+0.26	1	±0
United Left–The Greens–Republican Left: Municipal Agreement (EUPV–V–IR)	1,321	3.79	+0.21	0	±0
Valencian Union–The Eco-pacifist Greens (UV–LVEP)	1,304	3.74	−1.47	0	−1
Valencian Coalition (CVa)	305	0.88	New	0	±0
Social Democratic Party (PSD)	207	0.59	New	0	±0
United for Torrent (UxT)	131	0.38	New	0	±0
Republican Left of the Valencian Country–Municipal Agreement (ERPV–AM)	96	0.28	New	0	±0
Centrists National Organization (ONC)	34	0.10	New	0	±0
Blank ballots	411	1.18	−0.04		
Total	34,820			25	±0
Valid votes	34,820	99.62	−0.07		
Invalid votes	134	0.38	+0.07		
Votes cast / turnout	34,954	62.19	−1.70		
Abstentions	21,252	37.81	+1.70		
Registered voters	56,206				

=== Torrevieja ===
Population: 92,034

← Summary of the 27 May 2007 City Council of Torrevieja election results →
Parties and alliances	Popular vote			Seats	
Parties and alliances	Votes	%	±pp	Total	+/−
People's Party (PP)	11,863	53.03	−1.20	14	−1
Socialist Party of the Valencian Country (PSPV–PSOE)	6,469	28.92	−2.76	7	−1
United Left: Left and Ecologist Municipal Agreement (EUAMIE)	1,695	7.58	+2.21	2	+1
The Greens of the Valencian Country (LVPV)	1,658	7.41	New	2	+2
Social Democratic Party (PSD)	267	1.19	New	0	±0
Humanist Party (PH)	90	0.40	New	0	±0
Green Left–Valencian Nationalist Bloc (IV–Bloc)	n/a	n/a	−5.47	0	−1
Blank ballots	329	1.47	+0.43		
Total	22,371			25	±0
Valid votes	22,371	99.02	−0.27		
Invalid votes	222	0.98	+0.27		
Votes cast / turnout	22,593	51.64	−3.10		
Abstentions	21,162	48.36	+3.10		
Registered voters	43,755				

=== Valencia ===
Population: 805,304

== See also ==
- 2007 Valencian regional election
