= Coat of arms of the Valencian Community =

Coat of arms of Valencian Community

Versions
- Logo
- Armiger: Generalitat Valenciana
- Adopted: 17 June 1978; 48 years ago
- Crest: A winged dragon naissant, the Aragonese Open Royal Crown and a mantle Azure lined Gules with the Cross of Íñigo Arista
- Shield: Or, four pallets Gules.

The coat of arms of the Valencian Community is the official emblem of the self-government institutions of the Valencian Community in Spain. It is based on the armorial achievement used from the reign of King Peter IV to John II the Great. In 1978 the former Council of the Valencian Country approved it “...for being the oldest known representative emblem of the former Kingdom of Valencia, that had located on the Xerea Gate of the city of Valencia”.

The blazon of the arms of the Valencian Community is stated in Article 6 of the Title III (The Emblem) of the Law of the Generalitat Valenciana 8 of 4 December 1984, approving the symbols of the Valencian Community and its use, published in the Official Gazette of the Valencian Community - DOGV, no. 211 of 13 December 1984. It is composed as follows:

1. The emblem of the Generalitat Valenciana is constituted by the heraldry of King Peter the Ceremonious, for being representative of the former Kingdom of Valencia, it is blazoned as follows:

1.1. Shield: inclined dexter, Or, with four paletts Gules.

1.2. Crest: A crowned helmet Argent, hanging mantle Azure lined Gules with a curved cross pattée with a sharp point Argent; as crest, a winged dragon naissant, langued Gules and tooth Argent.

== History ==
Although Valencian popular traditions attribute the origin of crest of winged dragon to King James I the Conqueror, its origin can be traced back to King Peter IV in the 14th century, when crests came into regular use above noble helmets. According to Spanish historian Guillermo Fatás Cabeza, it could be considered as a quasi-canting emblem, an emblematic symbol of the Aragonese monarch. The mantle, the protective cloth covering worn by knights from their helmets was dark blue and charged with the Cross of Arista.

In some cases, the winged dragon will in time be transformed into in a bat, commonly used in local heraldry in territories that were part of the former Crown of Aragon like the City of Valencia, Palma, or Earlier versions of the armorial achievement of Barcelona.

The field Azure lined Gules and the Cross of Arista Argent symbolize the Jiménez dynasty (ancient kings of Aragon, before the union with Barcelona), they are part of the current version of the coat of arms of Aragon in its second quarter. The heraldry of his son and heir John the Hunter as Prince of Girona featured the same crest but the arms differenced with two paletts on a gold background instead four. Ferdinand I, first Aragonse monarch of the House of Trastámara, kept the coat of arms used by his predecessors. King Alfonso the Magnanimous replaced the mantle with the Cross of Arista and adopted lambrequins Gules and Or. Ferdinand II the Catholic, as King of Aragon, quartered the arms of Castile and Aragon but he continued to use the Aragonese royal crest.

In the city of Valencia, the Aragonese royal achievement of arms with the shield inclined dexter, helmet, mantle, crown, and crest is depicted on the façade of the Llotja de la Seda, the Serranos Gate and Quart Towers.

In 1394 appeared the Gold Real of Valencia, a coin whose obverse features the royal achievement of arms, with two palettes, and its reverse side featuring a lozenge with the Aragonese arms without crest.

Title pages of the Aureum Opus Regalium and the Primera part de la Història de València (1538) by Pere Antoni Beuter show the Aragonese royal achievement.

The Council of the Province of Valencia, founded as a result of the 1833 territorial division of Spain, adopted the royal achievement. It used different versions: with lambrequins, similar to similar to the one depicted on the title page of the Chronicle by Ramon Muntaner; with a mantle but an incorrect cross pattée, and a mantle with the Cross of Arista. Provincial councils of Alicante and Castellón chose their own coats of arms.

== Current situation ==
The coat of arms is not described in the Statute of Autonomy of the Valencian Community, despite article 4.2 recognises the possibility that the heraldry of the provinces to be added to the flag of Valencia. During the preparation of the Statute was clear that the coat of arms would be the current version, drafting the Statute of Benicassim it was agreed to add the former royal achievement in the flag of the autonomous community but finally it was not done.

There was a Decree of 9 August 1978 (before the adoption of the Statute of Autonomy) approving the official design and use of the coat of arms. Later other version with a different design, that is still official, was established by the Law of symbols of 4 December 1984.

== See also ==
- Coat of arms of the Crown of Aragon
- Flag of the Valencian Community
- Heraldic crest
- Saint George
- Senyera
