= Union of Aragon =

The Union of Aragon, Aragonese Union (Castilian and Aragonese: Unión Aragonesa, Catalan: Unió Aragonesa), or "Union of the Nobles" was an anti-royalist movement among the nobility and the townsmen of the lands of the Crown of Aragon during the last quarter of the thirteenth century. Its efforts culminated in a series of articles confirming the privileges of the aristocracy and the cities and circumscribing the power of the monarchy known as the Magna Carta of Aragon.

The Union had its origin in the nature of the Crown of Aragon, incorporating various kingdoms at various times. The various lands vied for the attention of the monarch and struggled to protect their privileges and their influence against the rise of any other. At the same time, King Peter III was conquering Sicily and his Spanish dominions were neglected.

Eventually, Pope Martin IV called a crusade, the Aragonese Crusade, against Peter and his kingdom, dissolving his subjects of their oaths of fealty. Peter had to exact heavy taxes in order to finance resistance to the "crusade" against him. The nobles of the kingdom, believing they should have been consulted before any campaign to Sicily, formed the Union.

In 1283, the nobles and burghers of Aragon held a court (cortes) in Zaragoza at which they swore to uphold each other's rights. Within three months, the Courts of Catalonia swore a similar oath at Tarragona. At both, Peter III had to recognise the ancient customs and fueros of the people and vow to summon the cortes annually. This was known as the General Privilege (Privilegio general).

In December 1286, the Union met at Zaragoza and then in January 1287 at Teruel. After brief talks with Alfonso III in May 1287, the Union invaded Valencia and fought some battles with the king's supporters until a Dominican prior from Zaragoza, Valero, organised a meeting in Zaragoza for 20 December. The Union forced many royal concessions from the weak Alfonso, who granted them the Privilege of the Union (Privilegio de la unión). The Privilege named the Union as the "true guardian of Aragonese law" in the Crown's territories. The Privilege devolved many royal functions to the lesser nobility and the Crown of Aragon nearly fell into anarchy, especially during the reign of Peter IV. Dante Alighieri placed Alfonso in his Purgatorio, outside the gates, for his part in fostering the chaos of Europe at the time. Alfonso himself, however, was not pleased, saying "en Aragón había tantos reyes como ricoshombres."

The Privilege ordained that the king could not proceed against any nobleman without the prior permission of the Justicia acting on the approval of the cortes. This last was to be summoned annually (in November) to the city of Zaragoza. If the king ever broke his terms of the Privilege, he need not be obeyed and no act against him was to be considered treason. Thus, the king could be deposed by the nobles in extreme circumstances. By January 1288, the Union was appointing the king's councillors.

James II refused to recognise the Privileges and, by the Act of Union, made permanent the Crown of Aragon and the union of Aragon, Valencia, and Catalonia under one crown. The Aragonese union was imitated by a Union of Valencia.

== Notes ==
=== Sources ===
- Chaytor, Henry John (1933). A History of Aragon and Catalonia. London: Methuen.
- Wintle, Justin (2003). The Rough Guide History of Spain. Penguin Group.
