= Pennon of the Conquest =

Flag raised in the surrender of Valencia to James I of Aragon

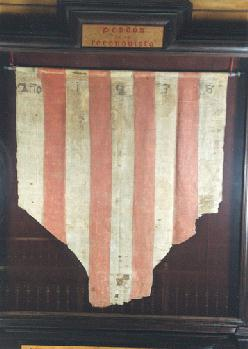
The Pennon of the Conquest of Valencia by James I of Aragon.

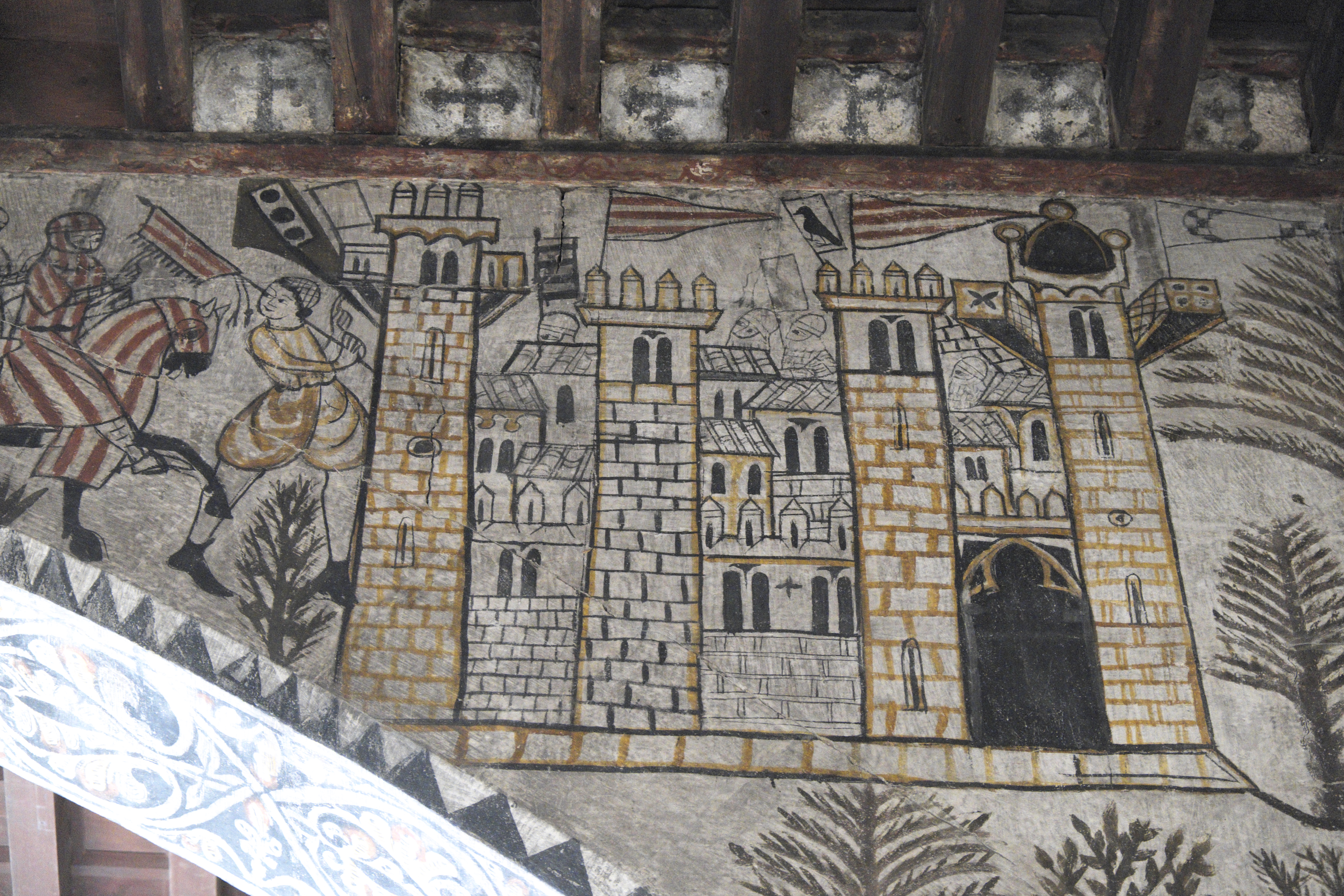
In this wall painting from the Castle of Alcañiz, James I approaches Valencia with striped flags on its towers.

The Pennon of the Conquest (Spanish: Pendón de la Conquista; Valencian: Penó de la Conquesta) is the flag raised by the Moors of Valencia, Spain, on September 28, 1238, on the tower of Alī-Bufāt, later called Torre del Temple, to indicate their surrender to the troops of king James I of Aragon, ending the 1238 Siege of Valencia. This episode is known from the quote entered by the king himself in his Chronicle:

"We were in the riverbed, between the gardens and the tower; and when we saw our flag upon the tower, we dismounted from our horse, and heading eastwards we cried from our eyes and kissed the earth for the great mercy God had made to us".

The Pennon is made of three pieces of white cloth (which the passage of time has turned into yellowish) sewed together, cut to give the flag a gonfalon shape, upon which 4 red stripes have been painted. It is about 2 m long and on top an epigraph reads año 1238 ("year 1238"). After the Conquest of Valencia it was considered a relic and was kept by order of James I of Aragon in the Church at Saint Vincent Hospital up to the 19th century, when it was transferred to its current location in the City Hall of Valencia, Spain.

== See also ==
- Flag of Valencia
- Senyera
