= Valencian National Flag =

Valencian
- Use: Civil flag
- Proportion: N/D
- Adopted: Unofficial
- Designed by: Valencian nationalism

The estrelada or valencian national flag (full name Senyera estrelada, meaning "starred flag", from estrela, star) is an unofficial flag typically flown by republican Valencian supporters to express their support for an independent Republic of Valencia. It evolved from the flag of the city of Valencia (nowadays the official flag of the Valencian Community), called senyera coronada.

The white star version has been used by Valencianist republican groups since the early 20th century. The first testimony of its use was a political meeting by Acció Nacionalista Valenciana in the 1930s. This political party had a large estrelada flag which used to be put up at the balcony on specific dates.

The most ancient known graphic document of an estrelada flag is a photograph of a rally in support of the Valencian Statute in Alzira, on 27 September 1932, and a red starred estrelada in a poster by Esquerra Valenciana. Nowadays is mostly used by the Valencian national movement.

== Origins ==
Flag of Esquerra Valenciana (1931).

The first testimony of the estrelada dates back to the early 1930s, in an act of Acció Nacionalista Valenciana. The oldest preserved graphic document with an estrelada is a photograph of a rally in favor of the Valencian Statute in Alzira, on September 27, 1932; and more famously a Spanish Civil War poster by Luis Dubon for Esquerra Valenciana.
