= Senyera =

Vexillogical symbol

- Senyera
- Use: Civil and state flag
- Proportion: 2:3
- Adopted: 25 May 1933 (as official flag of Catalonia)
- Design: Four red stripes on yellow background (representing gold).

The Senyera (Note: Eastern Catalan: [səˈɲeɾə]; meaning 'pennon, standard, banner, ensign', or more generically, 'flag' in Catalan) is a vexillological symbol based on the coat of arms of the Crown of Aragon, which consists of four red stripes on a yellow field (representing gold). This coat of arms, often called bars of Aragon, or simply "the four bars", historically represented the king of the Crown of Aragon.

The Senyera pattern is currently in the flag of four Spanish autonomous communities (Aragon, Catalonia, the Balearic Islands, and the Valencian Community), and is the flag of the historically Catalan-speaking city of Alghero (Catalan: L'Alguer) in Sardinia, Italy. It is also used on the coat of arms of Spain, the coat of arms of the Pyrénées-Orientales department and of Provence-Alpes-Côte d'Azur, the flag of Roussillon, Capcir, Vallespir, and Provence in France, on the coat of arms of Andorra, and on the local flags of many municipalities belonging to these territories. The Senyera (sometimes together with the flag of Andorra) is also used informally in Catalonia to represent the Catalan language. The coat of arms of Andorra includes a heraldic quarter representing Catalonia. The official Andorran legislation identifies the four traditional quarters of the coat of arms as those of the Bishopric of Urgell, Catalonia, Foix and Béarn.

It is also a synonym (in Catalan Senyal Reial or Senyera and old Spanish Señal Real or Señera) for Royal Flag, although the word normally refers to the Aragonese and Catalan flags. Also in Aragonese, it is usually referred to as O Sinyal d'Aragón, i.e. "The Sign of Aragón".

== Origin and history ==
King Alfons the Chaste riding a horse caparisoned in his familiar arms. From a 13th-century chansonnier. Document 854, folio 108r at Bibliothèque nationale de France.

The Senyera is one of the oldest flags in Europe still used in the present. There are several theories advocating either a purely Aragonese or a purely Catalan origin for the symbol.

The Gran Enciclopedia Aragonesa (1981) states that its first material undisputed evidence dates back to a royal seal of Alfonso II of Aragon (1159), and that all evidence about a "Catalan" origin is debatable since historically nothing can be accepted other than the concept of "Barcelonès", and understanding that as allusive to the House of Barcelona (Counts of Barcelona), and then, nothing referring to the ancient geographical area known as Cathalania, Catalonie (Catalonia) where the County of Barcelona was found. But in the Liber maiolichinus de gestis Pisanorum illustribus (c. 1114–1115) ("Book of the Mayorcan Deeds of the Illustrious Pisan Fleet") an epic Latin poem written between 1114 and 1115. The text holds significant historical and linguistic value as it contains the earliest known written attestations of the demonym Catalanenses ("Catalans") and the toponym Catalania ("Catalonia") to designate the people and territory under the authority of the Count of Barcelona and refers to him by several Latin epithets, including dux Catalanensis (“leader” or “duke of the Catalans”), rector Catalanicus (“Catalan ruler”), and Catalanicus heros (“Catalan hero”).

The Gran Enciclopèdia Catalana (1968) claims that the first appearance of the flag is in the arms of the tomb of Ramon Berenguer II, Count of Barcelona, died in 1082, but its evidentiary value is disputed because the visible Gothic enclosure dates from the 14th century, around 300 years later. The Gran Enciclopèdia Catalana also states that the flag also appears in the seals of Ramon Berenguer IV, Count of Barcelona of Barcelona and III of Provence in Provençal (1150) and then in Catalan (1157) documents.

The earliest known impressions of the equestrian seal of Ramon Berenguer IV, Count of Barcelona (c. 1150) are preserved in state archives. The seal depicts the count on horseback, holding a shield bearing a paled coat of arms (vertical bars), which is regarded as one of the earliest heraldic representations of the County of Barcelona and the Crown of Aragon.

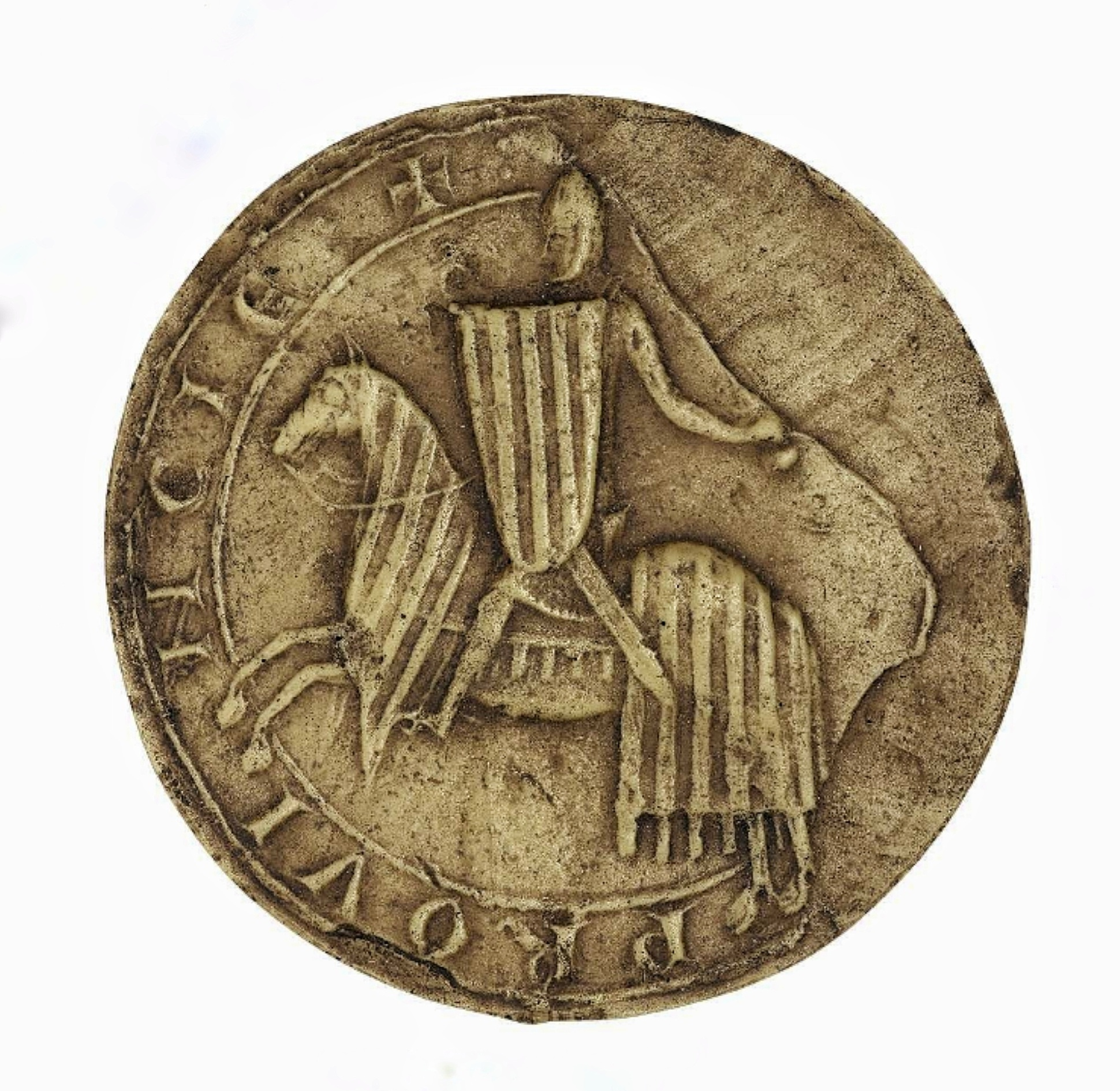
Shield of Ramon Berenguer IV (1235)

The origin of the symbol is also addressed in contemporary texts and original citations from the time of Peter the Ceremonious (1319–1387), which recount the family background and explain the union between the County of Barcelona and the Kingdom of Aragon. These includ The Chronicle of San Juan de la Peña (or Chronicon Sancti Johannis de Pinna, Cap. XXIII), written in the mid-14th century under the patronage of King Peter IV the Ceremonious.

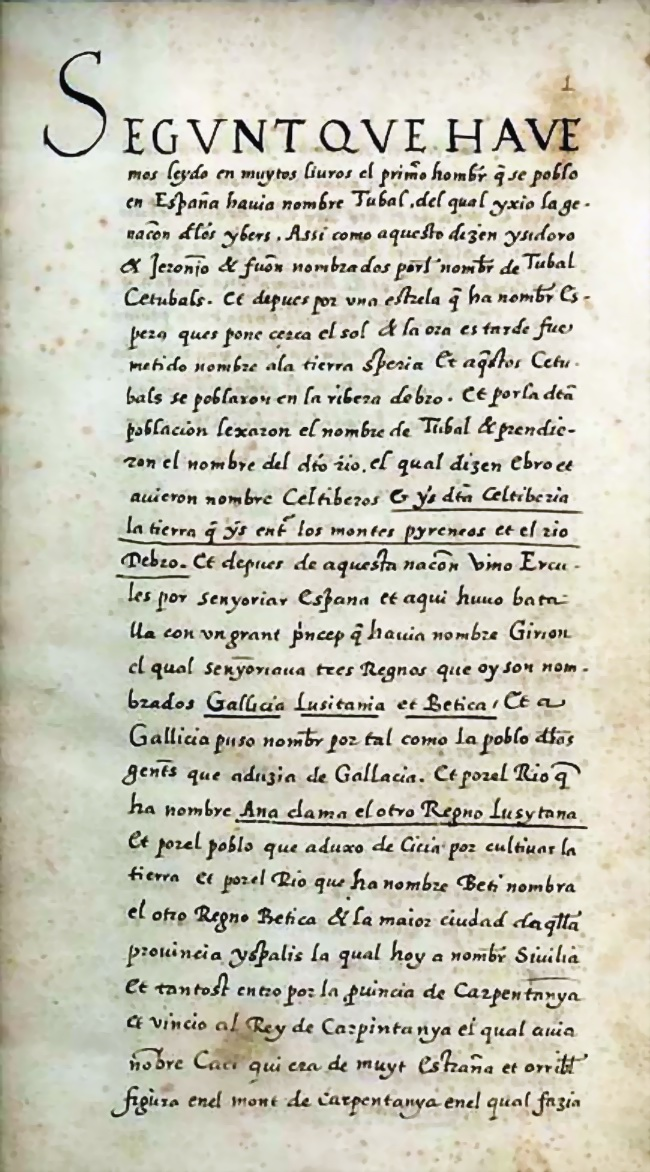
Chronicle of San Juan de la Peña (fol. 1r).

Latin text

"...Post decessum vero dicti comitis, successit ei filius ejus Ildefonsus, qui primus fuit rex Aragonum et comes Barcinonae simul.[...]primi regis Aragonum et comitis Barcinonae, qui mutavit arma Aragonum et accepit virgas sive baculos..."

English translation

"...After the death of the said count, he was succeeded by his son Alfonso, who was the first to be King of Aragon and Count of Barcelona at the same time. [...] first King of Aragon and Count of Barcelona, who changed the arms of Aragon and took up the rods or bars..."

Also in the Chronicle of Peter the Ceremonious c. 1349–1375). An excerpt from the Genealogia regum Navarrae et Aragoniae et comitum Barchinonae (c. 1380–1400).

Original in latin.

:«Unde cum Comes Barchinone in coronello hic descendente de scribitur Raimundus Berengarii huius nominis quartus supramemorati Raimundi Berengarii filius. Hic accepit in uxorem filiam dicti Regis Aragonum nomine Petronillam. Numquam tamen voluit rex appellari, sed administrator regni, nec arma comitatus mutare, unde adhuc signa regalia sunt illa que comitis Barchinone erant.»

English translation

:“Wherefore the Count of Barcelona descending from here is Ramon Berenguer, fourth of this name, son of the above-mentioned Ramon Berenguer. He took as his wife the daughter of the said King of Aragon named Petronilla. However, he never wished to be called king, but administrator of the kingdom, nor did he change the arms of the county, wherefore even today the royal signs are those which belonged to the count of Barcelona."

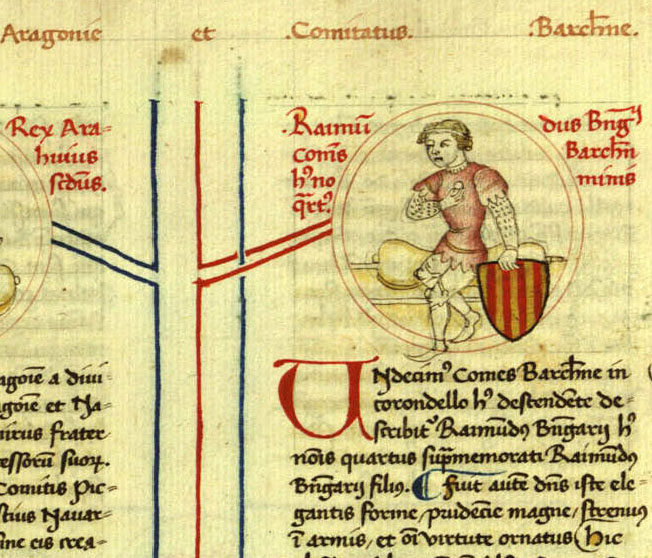
Genealogy of the kings of Navarre and Aragon and the counts of Barcelona, page 34v

.

Besides, amongst the ancient manuscripts preserved today in Poblet Monastery is found a Carte plegada on son tots los Reys d'Arago e Comtes de Barchinona figurats, a genealogical roll of the Kings of Aragon and Counts of Barcelona commissioned between 1396 and 1400 by King Martin I of Aragon. In the document, the four red stripes on a golden background appears only in the royal images painted of Wilfred the Hairy Count of Barcelona (878–897), Ramon Berenguer IV, Count of Barcelona (1131–1162), King Martin I of Aragon (1356–1410) and King Martin I of Sicily (1390–1409). So it may suggest the Four Red Bars on Golden Background emblem was believed to belong to the House of Barcelona and the Counts of Barcelona in times of the initial dynasty (1164–1410) who ruled the Crown of Aragon.

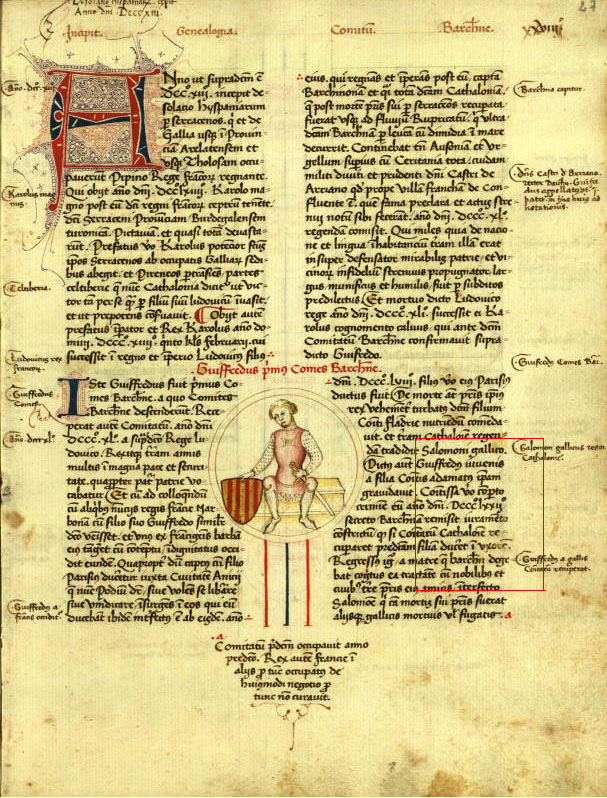
image painted of the Wilfred the Hairy, First Count of Barcelona (878–897)

.

Furthermore, the Pennon of the Conquest of Valencia is documented as the world's oldest extant flag, dating from 1238, even though the yellow part was originally white, but the red stripes design was the same.

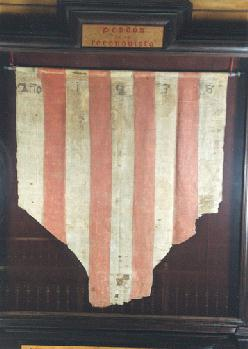
The Pennon of the Conquest of Valencia (1238) by James I of Aragon.

The Government of Catalonia states about its official symbols that it may derive from 11th century or 12th century pre-heraldic symbols and the County of Barcelona's coat of arms, in which the yellow and red bars were vertical, while horizontal in the flag. The dynastic coat of arms became also the one for the lands ruled by the counts. It is thus present in the flags and shields of the territories that once were part of the Crown of Aragon and also in the arms of Andorra, Provence-Côte d'Azur and Sicily among others.

Papal States flag prior to 1808

Another version is that the Kings of Aragon used and adopted the colours of the Papal States in their own coat of arms as a public and notorious submission to the Pope, something which the County of Barcelona would have followed shortly after according to this version. The colours for the city of Rome, which in those times was controlled by the Pope, were the same. According to the Encyclopædia Britannica, the flag of the Holy See's Navy from the 12th century on consisted of two vertical red and yellow bands, sometimes bearing the tiara and the keys. According to the Vatican official website, the yellow and red of the flag of the Holy See were two colours traditional of the Roman Senate and People. This ancient flag can still be seen on the Capitoline Hill in Rome, near the Roman Forum. The Papal States changed its colours in 1808 to the present yellow and white, while the City of Rome sticks to the old colours to this day. We can reject this theory based on the works of Geronimo de Blancas, chronicler of the Kingdom of Aragon, 1585. This author reports that Pope Innocent III after crowning the King Pedro II (the Catholic) accepted that Aragon was a tributary kingdom of the Apostolic See. To compensate for this gesture the Pope appointed King Peter II Gonfalonier of the Church and that the Church's banner had the colours of the crown of Aragon.

The Almogavars of the Catalan Company used a royal pennon with the arms of the Kings of Aragon when campaigning in the Byzantine Empire. It was used as ensign of the Aragonese Navy from 1263 to 1516.

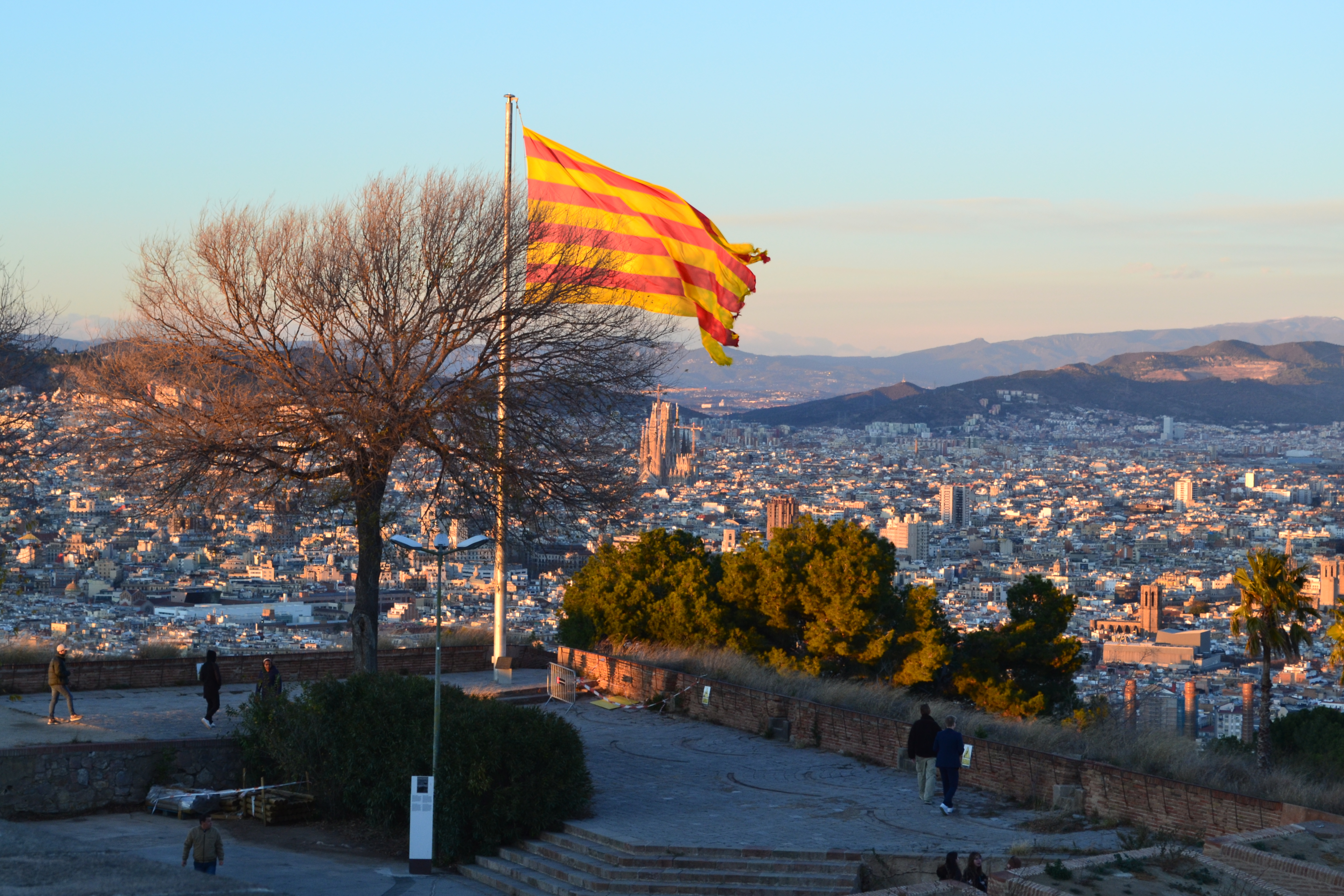
The Senyera flying on the Montjuïc Castle

The plain version of this was used as official flag of the Autonomous Region of Catalonia during the Second Spanish Republic and since the Spanish transition to democracy. In its plain version, it is also used in the French département of Pyrénées-Orientales (Northern Catalonia), part of the former Principality of Catalonia until 1659. It is also used as the flag of Provence, a distinct region with historic ties to the Counts of Barcelona and the Crown of Aragon.

The blazon of this standard version is Or, four bars Gules.

=== Modern usage ===
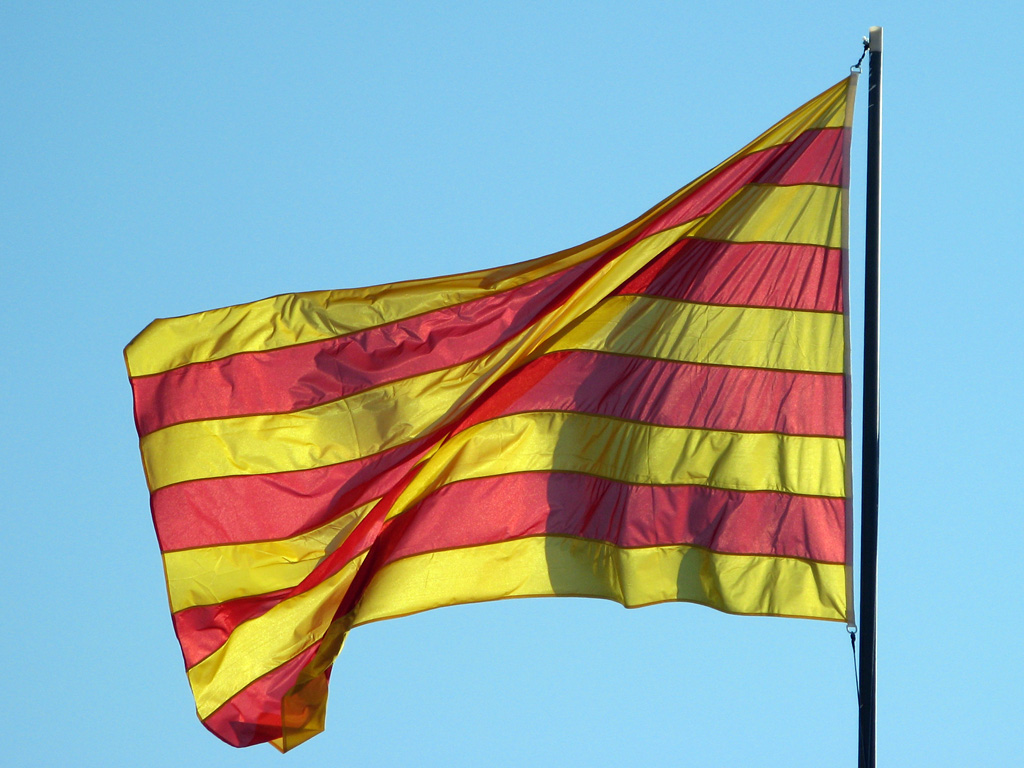
Flag of Catalonia at the Plaça Octavià in Sant Cugat del Vallès

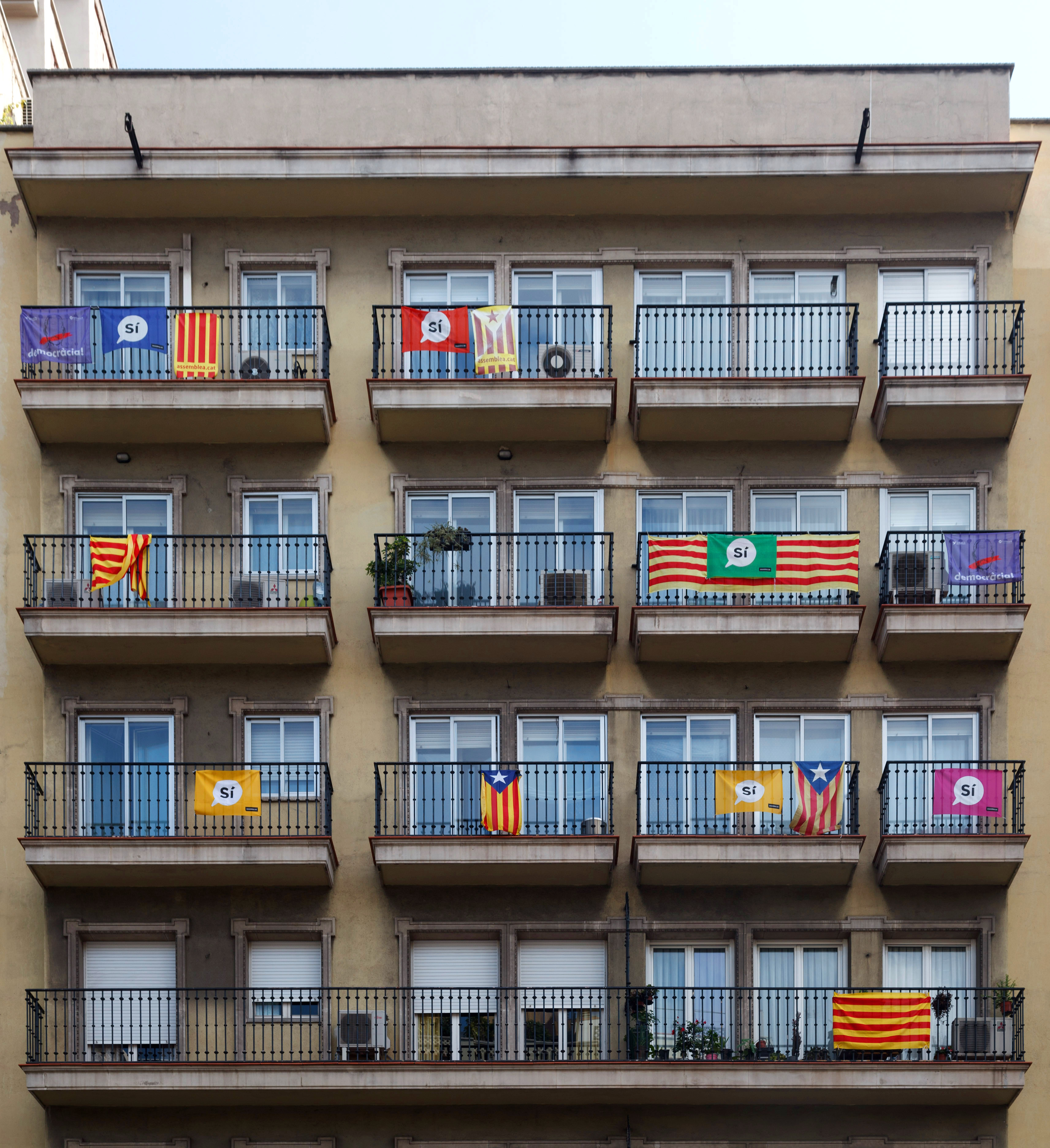
Different versions of the Senyera displayed in Barcelona during the 2017 independence referendum campaign

The Senyera pattern is nowadays in the flag of four Spanish autonomous communities: without any change for Catalonia, and, with variations, for the territories of the former kingdoms of the Crown of Aragon: Aragon proper, the Balearic Islands and Valencia (while the former two are modern interpretations, the Valencian Senyera Coronada does originate back to medieval times). It also forms the basis of various unofficial versions, such as the blue or red estelada used by Catalan independence supporters.

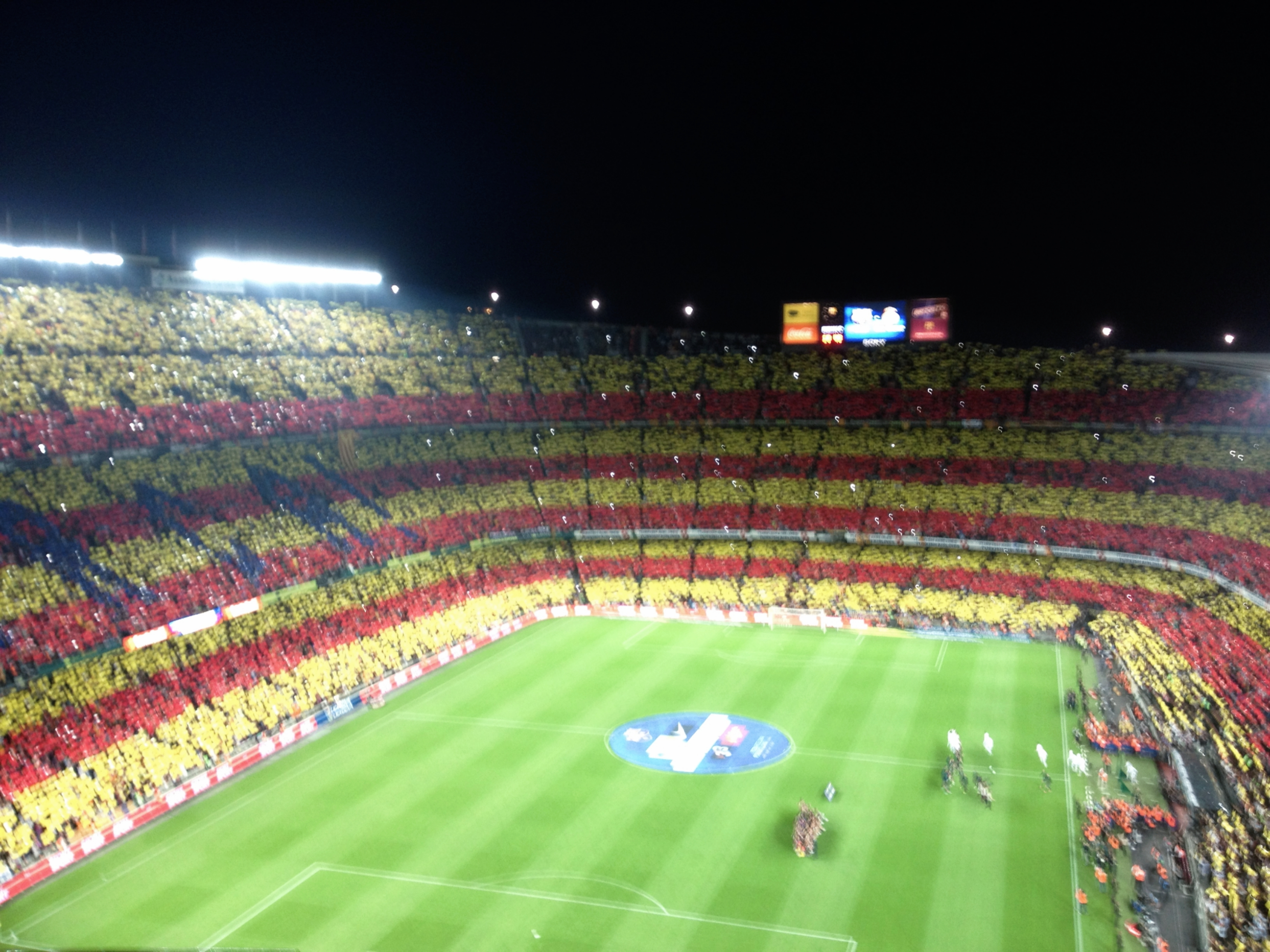
The Camp Nou, home of FC Barcelona, creating an enormous mosaic of the Senyera before a match with Real Madrid

The Senyera is also the basis for the coat of arms of Pyrénées-Orientales, the flag of the pays of Roussillon in France, and one quarter of the Coat of arms of Andorra. Dozens of municipalities belonging to these territories base their local flags on the Senyera as well.

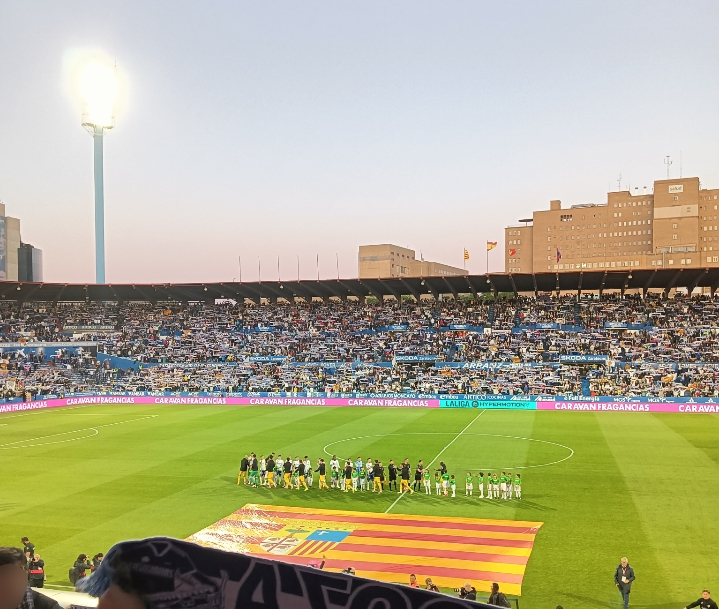
Flag of Aragón displayed before kick-off of the Aragoneses Derby in La Romareda, home of Real Zaragoza

=== Origin legends ===
According to a 14th-century legend, the flag dates back from the 9th century, when the four red bars were drawn, as an act of gratitude, on Wilfred I the Hairy's (Count of Barcelona) golden shield by king Charles the Bald's fingers drenched with blood from the Count's war wounds prior to Wilfred's death in 897 during the siege of Barcelona by Lobo ibn Mohammed, the Moorish governor of Lleida. This legend would relate the emblem unambiguously to the Counts of Barcelona title. However, Charles the Bald had died 20 years earlier, in 877. Romantic-driven Catalan nationalists were particularly keen on this legend during the Renaixença, in the 19th century, albeit it has always been recognized and divulged as such even in patriotic circles.

Another version of this legend cites Louis the Pious as the king drawing the bars during the conquest of Barcelona, in this version drawing them in a golden shield, but Louis died before Guifré was born. Also, Barcelona was conquered long before the events described on the legend. Another medieval variant of the legend features Ramon Berenguer painting the bars with his own blood on a yellow shield, with the yellow field of the shield being the arms of Aragon before his marriage.

== Variations ==
There are a few variations in the official flags of other territories. For instance, in Aragon an extra coat-of-arms, in Balearic Islands a castle in the canton, and in València a blue crowned fringe on the hoist.

=== Current official territorial flags ===
==== Countries ====
Andorra

Spain

==== NUTS 1/NUTS 2 ====
Aragon

Balearic Islands

Catalonia

Provence-Alpes-Côte d'Azur (France)

Valencian Community (Reial Senyera)

==== NUTS 3 ====
Province of Barcelona

Province of Catanzaro (Italy)

Formentera

Province of Girona

Province of Huesca

Ibiza

Province of Lecce (Italy)

Province of Lleida

Province of Lleida (variant)

Mallorca

Menorca

Pyrénées-Orientales (France)

Metropolitan City of Reggio Calabria (Italy)

Province of Salamanca

Province of Tarragona

Province of Teruel

Province of Zaragoza

Millau

==== Geographical regions ====
Flag of Provence (France)

Val d'Aran

==== Municipalities ====
Abanilla, Murcia

Albelda

Alcampell

Alcañiz

Alcorisa

Alghero, Sardinia (Italy)

Altorricón

Altura

Aitona

Alacant

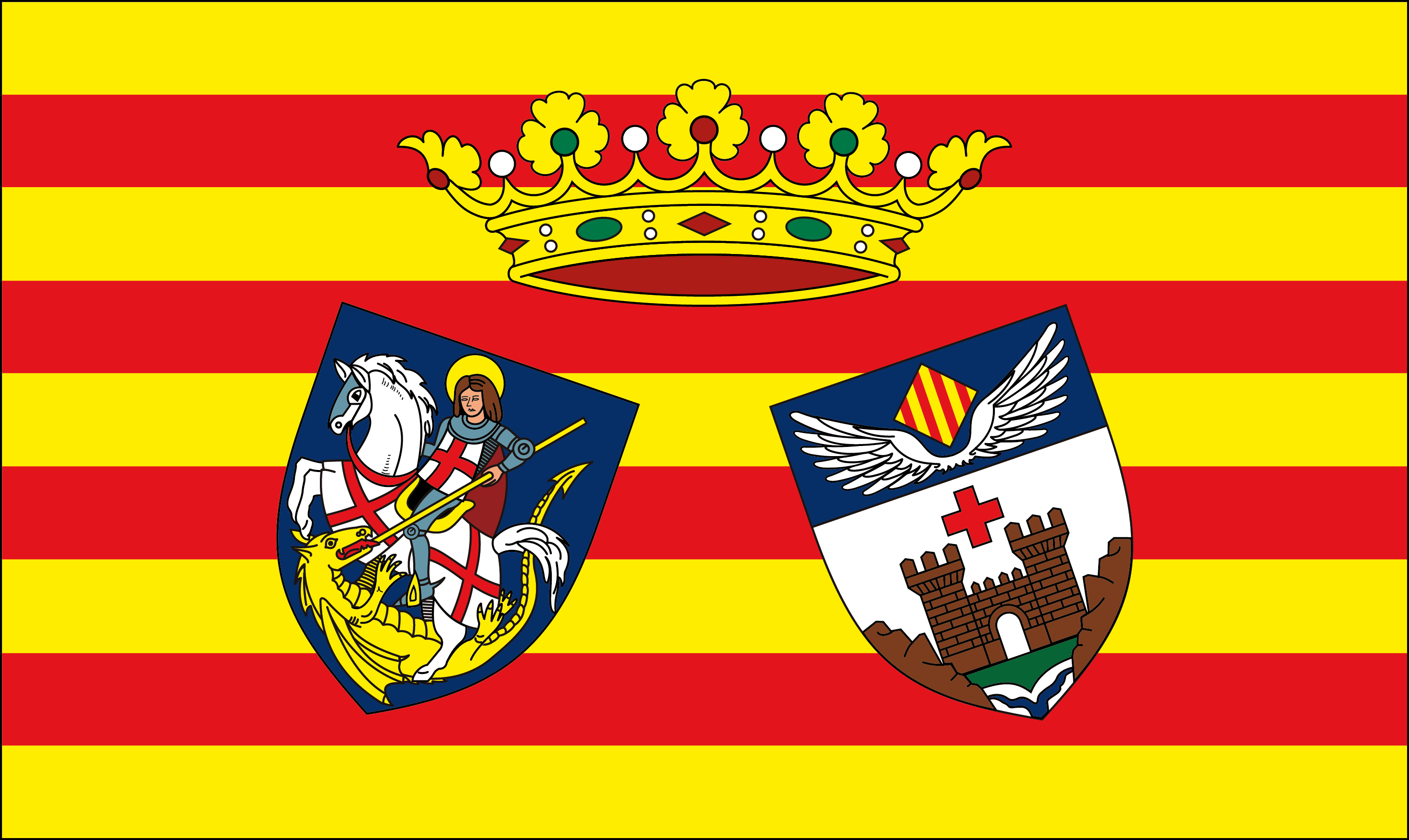
Alcoi

Altea

Alzira

Amposta

Argentona

Badalona

Balaguer

City of Barcelona

Barceloneta, Puerto Rico

Barracas

Benabarre

Benetússer

Beniarbeig

Benicàssim

Benissa

Banyeres de Mariola

Berga

Besalú

Betxí

Blancafort

Buñol

Borriana

Caldes de Montbui

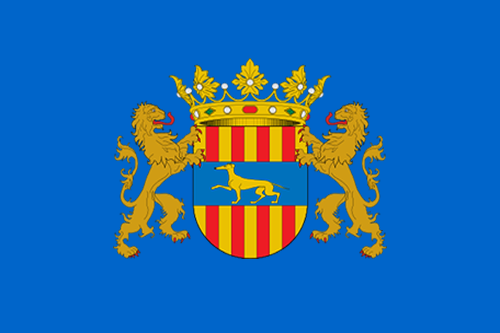
Cambrils

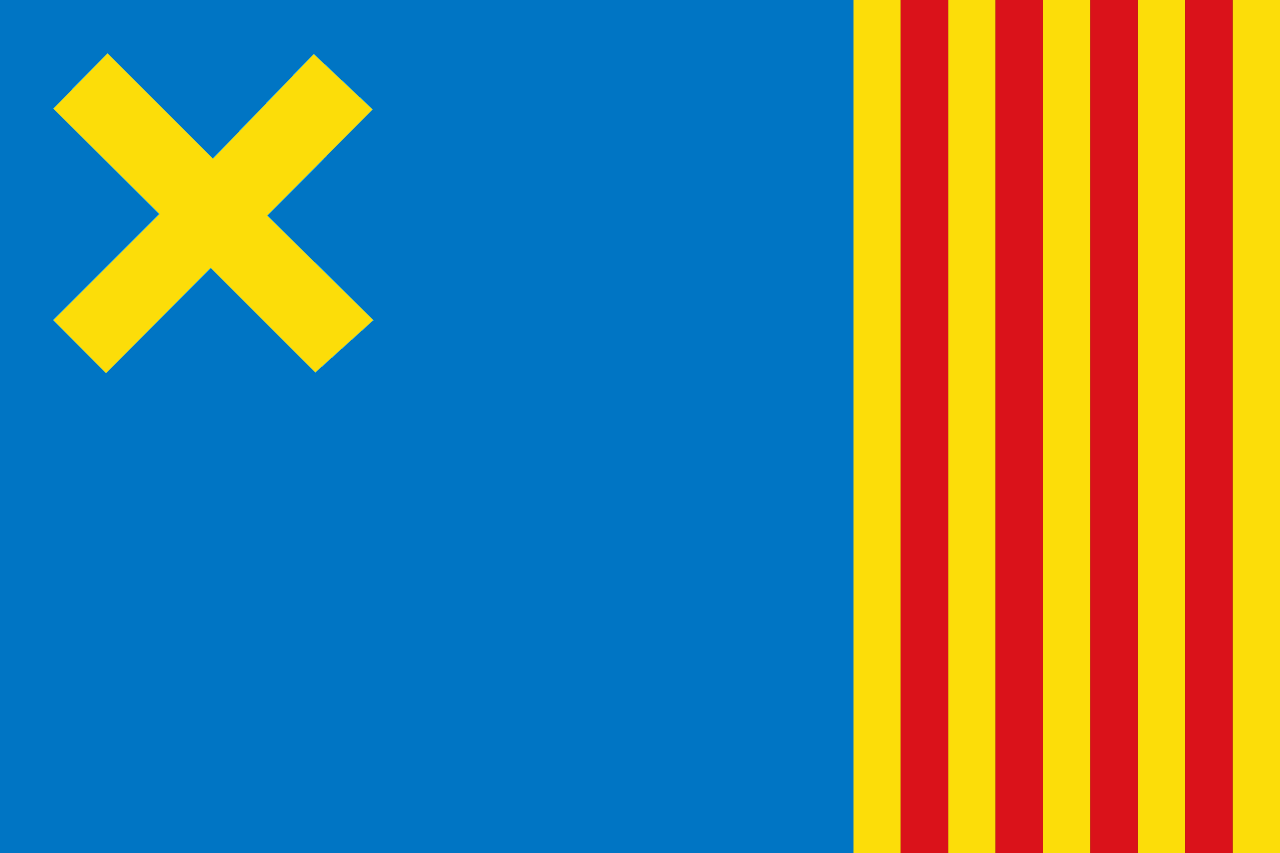
Camós

Campos

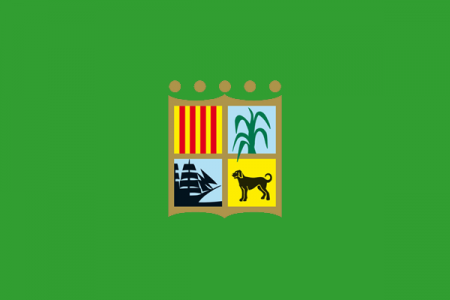
Canet de Mar

Cardedeu

Castelló

Castelló de la Plana

Castelló d'Empúries

Castellví de la Marca

Caudiel

Cerdanyola del Vallès

Cervera

Corçà

Cornellà de Llobregat

Cretas

Crevillent

Cubelles

Cunit

El Puig de Santa Maria

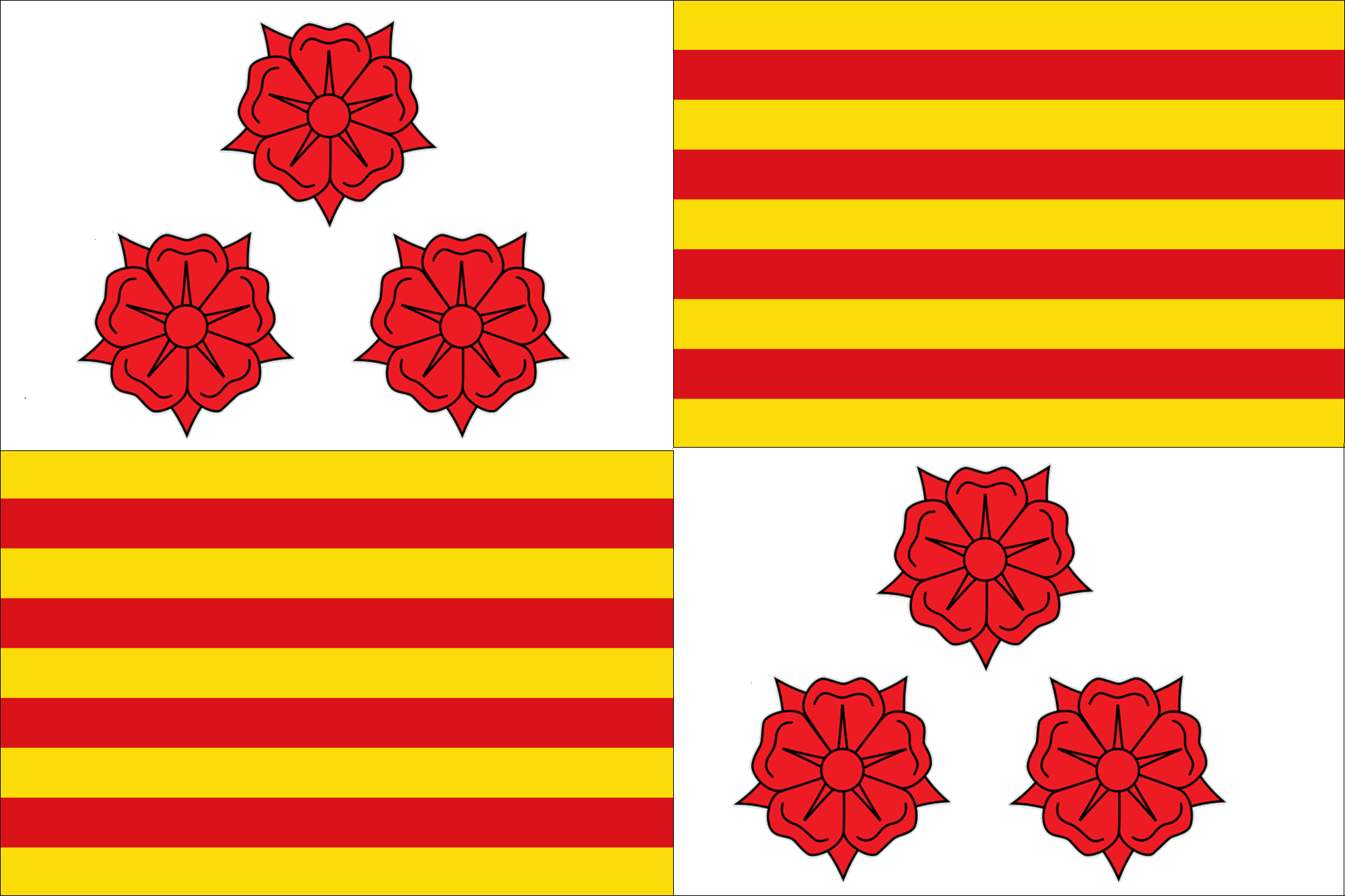
Els Prats de Rei

Elx

Felanitx

Figueres

Fraga

Gaià

Gavà

Geldo

Girona

Ibi

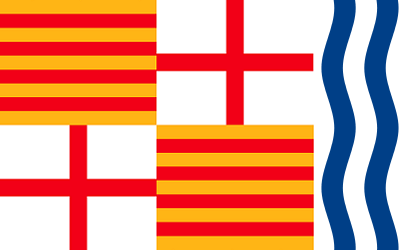
Igualada

Inca

Jérica

Juià

La Llosa de Ranes

Lascuarre

La Vall de Gallinera

Les Alqueries

Les Borges Blanques

Les Franqueses del Vallès

L'Hospitalet de Llobregat

Lleida

Llucmajor

Llubí

Macastre

Manacor

Manresa

Mahón

Massamagrell

Montuïri

Olost

Olot

Ontiñena

Ontinyent

Onda

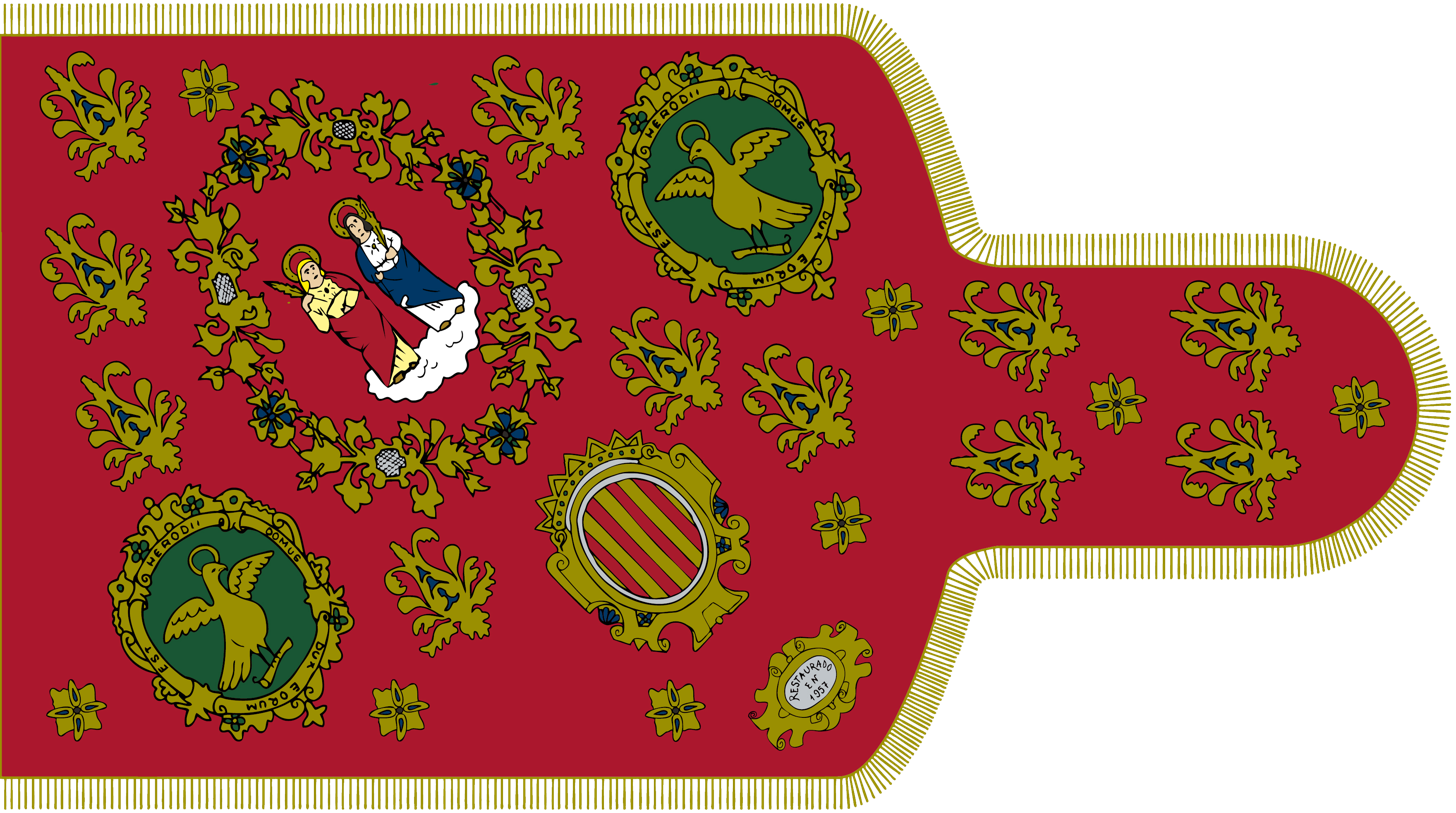
Orihuela

Palma

Pardines

Parets del Vallès

Pedreguer

Pina de Montalgrao

Planes

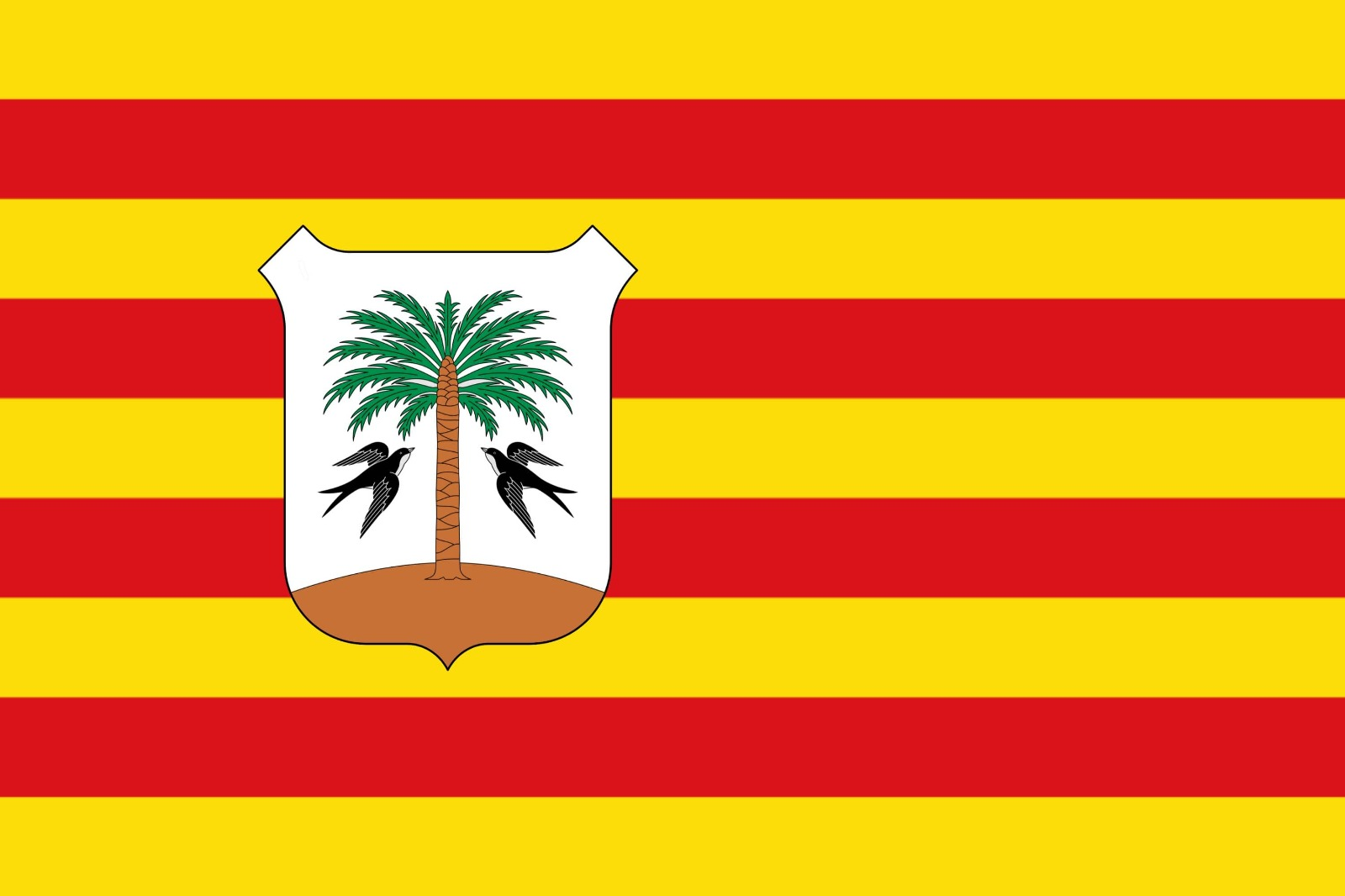
Porreres

Prades

Puçol

Riba-roja de Túria

Sagunt

Salamanca

San Germán (Puerto Rico)

Santa Eugènia

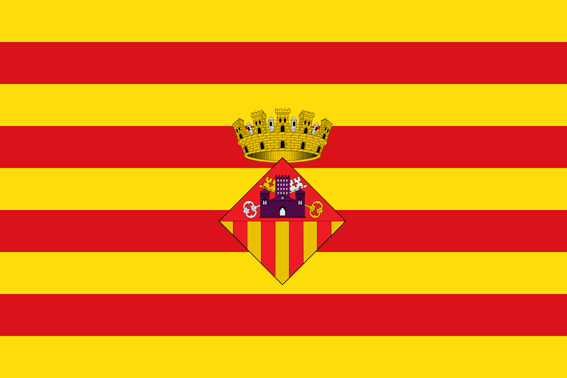
Sant Cugat del Vallès

Sant Feliu de Buixalleu

Sant Feliu de Pallerols

Sant Fost de Campsentelles

Sant Gregori

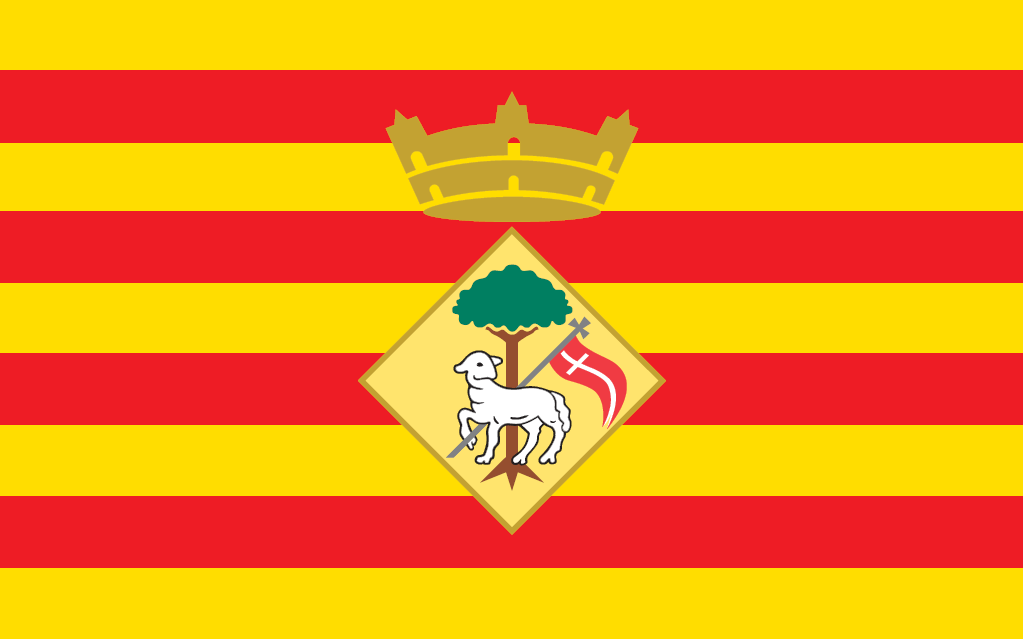
Sant Joan Despí

Santa Margarida i els Monjos

Santanyí

Santpedor

Sa Pobla

Saus, Camallera i Llampaies

Sencelles

Senyera

Ses Salines

Silla

Sineu

Subirats

Tarragona

Tàrrega

Teià

Terrassa

Tona

Torrelavit

Torroella de Montgrí

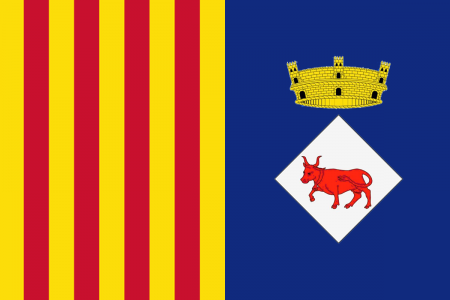
Vacarisses

City of Valencia (Reial Senyera)

Vallromanes

Vencillón

Verges

Vic

Vilafranca de Bonany

Vilagrassa

Vilanova de Prades

Vilanova i la Geltrú

Vila-real

Xàtiva

=== Historical flags ===
Crown of Aragon flag

The Pennon of the Conquest of Valencia

interim Valencian Community (1979–1980)

Kingdom of Sicily flag

Kingdom of Naples flag (1442–1501)

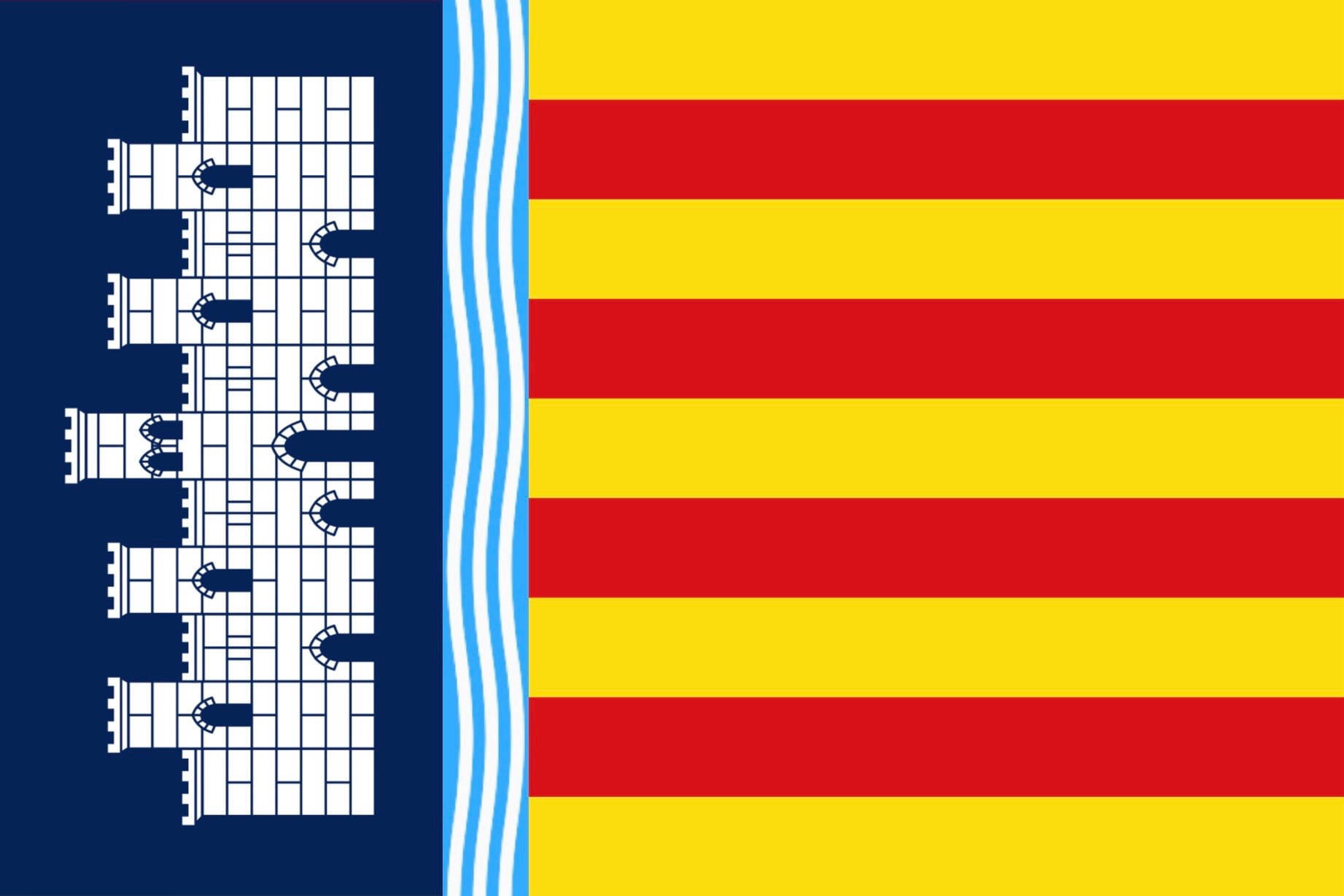
Kingdom of Majorca (1269–1312)

City and Kingdom of Majorca (1312–1715)

Flag of the former French region of Languedoc-Roussillon (1970–2015)

=== Military ===
Guindom of the 6th Airborne Brigade "Almogávares" (Obverse)

=== Flags of political movements ===
Estrelada aragonesa (Aragonese nationalist flag)

Catalan Independentist blue estelada

Catalan Socialist Independentist red estelada

Valencian nationalist estrelada

Valencian socialist estrelada

Sicilian Independentist Movement flag

== See also ==
- Coat of arms of the Crown of Aragon
- Estelada
- Flag of Spain
- Flag of Valencia
- Pennon of the Conquest
- Coat of arms of Andorra
- Le Perthus Pyramid
- Aix-en-Provence
