= Valencian Left (1934) =

Valencian Left Esquerra Valenciana
- Leaders: Vicent Marco Miranda
- Founded: 1934
- Dissolved: 1939
- Split from: Partido de Unión Republicana Autonomista
- Headquarters: València
- Ideology: Republicanism; Valencian nationalism Progressivism
- Political position: Left-wing
- International affiliation: None

Party flag

Valencian Left (Catalan: Esquerra Valenciana) was a nationalist Valencian leftist political party founded in July 1934, that advocated self-determination of the Valencian Community. The party was suppressed in Francoist Spain and was not revived when democracy returned to Spain in the late 1970s.

== History ==
The party had its origins in a split in Partit d'Unió Republicana Autonomista (Republican Autonomous Union Party), over disagreements on political strategy. The new organization promoted the idea of one confederation of Catalan speaking regions, which resulted in moves towards a merger with Esquerra Republicana del País Valencià (Republican Left of the Valencian Country), which were initially proposed by Esquerra Republicana de Catalunya (Republican Left of Catalonia) in 1933 in Castellón. The merger eventually took place in 1935 under the direction of personalities like Gaietà Huguet (ERPV ex-militant), Vicent Marco Miranda (ex-mayor of València), Josep Benedito, Miquel Duran de València and Manuel Sanchis-Guarner.

Between 1935 and 1939, when the party was banned, eventually vanishing, it is difficult to distinguish between the history of ERPV and EV. After obtaining the election of Vicent Marco in 1936 in Valencia as part of the Frente Popular (Popular Front) list, ERC and EV formed a joint parliamentary group in the Spanish Congress under the name of Esquerra Catalana (Catalan Left). However, the Spanish Civil War halted various political projects in which EV had participated, the most important of which was a proposal for a Valencian statute of autonomy, under the official name of País Valencià "Valencian Community". During the civil war, EV's membership peaked at around 10,000 members in 1937.

== Notes ==
This page incorporates text from the Valencian Left article.
