= Movement for People's Unity–Republicans =

Movement for People's Unity–Republicans Movimiento por la Unidad del Pueblo–Republicanos
- Secretary-General: María Angeles Cabanillas Moreno
- Founded: 2003
- Headquarters: C/ Manuel Vicente Pastor, 90 bajo; Elche
- Ideology: Republicanism; Socialism; Federalism
- Political position: Left-wing
- National affiliation: Republicans
- Colors: Red, Yellow and Murrey
- Local Government (2015-2019): 1 / 67,515

Movement for People's Unity–Republicans" (Spanish: Movimiento por la Unidad del Pueblo–Republicanos, MUP–R) is a Spanish left-wing republican political party in Spain. The party is a member of Republicans, a federation of political parties in Spain.

== Ideology ==
MUP-R was founded with the purpose of bringing together those who feel left-wing and Republican and who disagree with the policies of United Left (IU) after the leadership of Julio Anguita, especially the alliances with the Socialist Party (PSOE). MUP-R criticized the inaction of the IU, supporting a rupture with the socioeconomic regime of the monarchy of Juan Carlos I and considered that unity among the popular classes will lead to the victory of a Popular and Federal Republic of Spain.

== History ==
MUP-R was founded in 2003 as the Movement for People's Unity (MUP) by ex-members of IU in the city of Elche, running for the local elections of that year in that city. The list gained 492 votes (0.48%), failing to win any seats in the local council. MUP continued to be centered in Elche, organizing some social protests, such as those in 2004, which mobilized more than 1,000 people due to the closure of footwear factories.

In 2007 the MUP adopted its current name and officially registered as a political party. The same year MUP–R expanded outside of the city of Elche, running for the local elections in Elche (502 votes, 0.48%), Alicante (57, 0.04%) and Arévalo (233, 5.41%), failing to win any seats again. In the local elections of 2011 MUP–R called for "combative left unity lists" to fight against cuts. This call was successful in Cartaya (joint list with IU), that one a seat in the local council. MUP-R also run its own lists in Arévalo (264, 6.02%), San Roque (154, 1.24%) and Sagunt (374, 1.19%). In the Spanish general election of 2011 MUP–R joined the Republicans Federation (along with Republican Left, Republican Union, Spanish Republican Democratic Action, Republican Group of Coslada and the Alternative Left Movement) gaining 5,430 votes (0.02%).

In the municipal elections of 2015 MUP–R gained 1 town councillor in Arévalo (within the Unitarian Left Candidacy, a coalition with the local assembly of IU and the local círculo of Podemos).

== See also ==
- Republicanism in Spain
