= Valencian Left =

Valencian Left Esquerra Valenciana
- President: Robert Mora i Sancho
- Founded: 1998
- Split from: Unitat del Poble Valencià
- Headquarters: C/ Velázquez, 19 - 4. D, Madrid
- Ideology: Valencian nationalism Democratic socialism Republicanism; Independentism; Left-wing nationalism
- National affiliation: Bloc Nacionalista Valencià (2007–2016); Esquerra Republicana (2017–)

Website
- www.esquerra-valenciana.org

Valencian Left (Valencian: Esquerra Valenciana) is a nationalist Valencian leftist party founded in the Valencian Community, founded in April, 1998 a group of ex-members of Unitat del Poble Valencià (Valencian People's Union) formed left this party and went to form a new political group using the vacant name of the historical Esquerra Valenciana. EV's current president is Robert Mora.

== History ==
The dissidentgroup of members of Unitat del Poble Valencià who disagreed with UPV refounding itself as the Bloc Nacionalista Valencià (Valencian Nationalist Group) (BNV) and went to form their own political party under the EV acronym. The party defined itself as a party "of the National, Republican Left of the Valencian Country; that fights for political sovereignty and defends the free confederation of this territory with Catalonia and the Balearic Islands".

In 2001 unsuccessful attempts were made towards a merger or alliance with Esquerra Republicana del País Valencià (Republican Left of the Valencian Country, ERPV). The agreement granted to the members of Esquerra Valenciana (EV) a chair in the executive committee of ERPV for each 12 members who joined her. Later the new alliance would have stood under the designation EV-ERPV. EV took part in the 2003 Valencian Community elections as part of l'Entesa electoral coalition, together with Esquerra Unida and the Green Party of the Land of Valencia. Although l'Entesa obtained 6 deputies not one of them was a member of EV. In the European elections of 2004 they were part of the Europa dels Pobles (Europe of the People) list together with ERC, Aralar and Chunta Aragonesista (other regional parties of the Spanish state).

Esquerra Valenciana joined the Bloc in 2007, and remained inactive until it allied in 2014 with Estat Valencià (Valencian State), another souveranist faction of the Bloc, to form a left-wing independence pole. Esquerra Valenciana, however, left Compromís in December 2016 and associated itself with ERPV a year later, during the October 2017 Aplec del Puig.
