= Language secessionism =

Reclassifying a language variety as a distinct language

Language secessionism (also known as linguistic secessionism or linguistic separatism) is an attitude supporting the separation of a language variety from the language to which it has thitherto been considered to belong, in order for the said variety to be considered a distinct language. This attitude was first analyzed in Catalan sociolinguistics but it is attested in other parts of the world.

== In Arabic ==
=== Sociolinguistic background ===
The Arab world is characterized by diglossia: local dialects dominate the sphere of daily communication, while Standard Arabic carries high prestige and is used in formal writing and speaking.

This situation has important political and social implications. Modern Standard Arabic is the official language of all Arab countries, and enjoys the status of a global language. Standard Arabic is also the lingua sacra of Islam, which further increases its importance. However, a claim could be made that it is no one's first language, since Arab children acquire their local dialect in the natural process of generational language transmission, and learn Standard Arabic later, when they begin formal education. Proficiency in Standard Arabic provides insight into a vast literary tradition spanning over 1,500 years. However, proponents of recognizing local Arabic dialects as official languages claim that the discrepancy between spoken vernaculars and Standard Arabic is just too wide, rendering proficiency in Standard Arabic unattainable for most.

=== In Egyptian Arabic ===
Egyptian linguistic separatism is the most well-developed linguistic separatism in the Arab World. The most popular platform diffusing the idea of the Modern Egyptian Language (rather than the Egyptian dialect) is the Egyptian Arabic Wikipedia also known as Wikipedia Masry or Maṣrī. It was the first Wikipedia written in one of the many Arabic dialects. Importantly, the idea of Egyptian linguistic separatism goes further back, to thinkers such as Salama Musa, Bayyūmī Qandīl, Muḥsin Luṭfī as-Sayyid, and the Liberal Egyptian Party.

Egyptian linguistic separatism does not simply claim that Egyptian Arabic should become the official language of Egypt, which in and of itself is a matter decided by politicians, not linguists. However, proponents of Egyptian linguistic separatism, such as Bayyūmī Qandīl, substantiate their political demands with pseudoscientific claims.

Linguistic separatism remains a fringe movement within Egyptian society. The idea remains particularly attractive to Coptic Christians and liberals, who see Egyptian nationalism as an alternative to Pan-Arabism and Pan-Islamism.

== In Catalan and Occitan ==
=== Common characteristics ===
In the Occitano-Romance languages, language secessionism is a quite recent phenomenon that has developed only since the 1970s. Language secessionism affects both Occitan and Catalan languages with the following common features:

- A breakaway from the tradition of Occitan and Catalan 19th century revivalist movements, which usually support the internal unity of each of these languages.
- An often deliberate ignorance of the tradition of Romance linguistics.
- An exacerbation of the cultural identity linked to dialects, which secessionism considers as separate languages.
- A lack of success (or a very marginal position) in linguistic scientific research.
- An active lobbying in regional political circles.
- The support of a writing system or of any prescription, which breaks up linguistic unity and exaggerates dialectal particular features.

=== In Catalan ===
In Catalan, there are three cases:

- Valencian language secessionism, or blaverism, appeared during the democratic transition of 1975–1981, after the fall of Francoism. It is supported by some conservative circles of Valencian society, who are branded "post-Francoist" by their rivals who consider Valencian and Catalan one and the same language. It has a variable impact on the population: Valencian people usually call their language "Valencian" but are divided about the unity of Catalan: some people agree that "Valencian" is just the regional name for "Catalan" but others consider "Valencian" a distinct language from "Catalan". Blaverism has very little impact in the linguistic community. Valencian institutions and Valencian partisans of Catalan unity use the official norm of Catalan (as codified by Institut d'Estudis Catalans and Acadèmia Valenciana de la Llengua), while "Blavers" (partisans of blaverism) mostly write Valencian using an alternative standard called "Normes del Puig" (codified by the Royal Academy of Valencian Culture).
- Balearic language secessionism vis-à-vis Catalan is quite marginal and is supported by a few cultural groups. It has very little impact on the population. It is included in a wider (but unorganized) tendency called "gonellisme", which struggles against the standardization of Catalan.
- In Franja de Ponent (a Catalan-speaking strip in eastern Aragon), language secessionism is quite marginal. It appeared during the 2000s. It is supported only by a fraction of the already minority pro-Aragonese movements, who overstate a so-called Aragonese ancestry in the Catalan spoken in Aragon.

=== In Occitan ===
There are three cases in Occitan:

- In the Auvernhat dialect, language secessionism has been supported since the 1970s by Pierre Bonnaud, who founded the Bonnaudian norm, the group Cercle Terre d'Auvergne and the review Bïzà Neirà. It has negligible impact in the population, where knowledge of the language is in any case at best residual. Auvernhat cultural circles are divided between the unitary vision of Occitan (associated with the Occitan classical norm) and secessionism (associated with Bonnaudian norm).
- In the Provençal dialect, language secessionism appeared during the 1970s with Louis Bayle and has been reactivated since the 1990s by Philippe Blanchet and groups like "Union Provençale" and "Collectif Provence". This secessionism supports the Mistralian norm (but it does not represent all Mistralian norm users, since some of them claim traditionally the unity of Occitan). It has little impact in the population, whose knowledge of the language is anyway residual. Provençal cultural circles are divided between the unitary vision (supported by users of both Mistralian norm and classical norm) and the secessionist vision (supported by some users of the Mistralian norm). The Regional Council of Provence-Alpes-Côte d'Azur voted a resolution on 5 December 2003 that approved the principle of the unity of "Occitan or Langue d'Oc" and the fact that Provençal is a part of it.
- In the Gascon dialect, language secessionism is claimed since the 1990s by Jean Lafitte, who created during the 2000s a group called "Institut Béarnais et Gascon". It has negligible impact in the population. Lafitte's secessionism supports two original writing systems: one is a nonstandard spin-off from the classical norm and the other one is a nonstandard spin-off from the Mistralian norm. Gascon cultural circles almost unanimously support the unitary vision of the Occitan language. In Aran Valley (a little Gascon Occitan-speaking area in Spain), Aranese, the local variety of Gascon, is officially recognized as a part of the Occitan language. The status of semi-autonomy of Aran Valley (1990) presents Gascon Aranese as "Aranese, the variety of the Occitan language peculiar to Aran ("Er aranés, varietat dera lengua occitana e pròpia d'Aran"). Similarly, the status of autonomy of Catalonia, as reformed in 2006, confirms it with the following expression: "The Occitan language, which is named Aranese in Aran" ("Era lengua occitana, denominada aranés en Aran").

== In Galician-Portuguese ==
Galician and Portuguese were born in the Kingdom of Galicia, in the north-west of the Iberian Peninsula. From there it spread southward, into what would later become the Kingdom of Portugal, and later around the world as a result of colonization.

Since Galicia came under the rule of the Kingdom of Castile, and later of the Kingdom of Spain, the Galician-Portuguese language entered into a situation of diglossia with the Castilian language. Over time, two linguistic currents emerged: one that sought to keep Galician as a regional language subordinated to Castilian, and another that sought to maintain the unity of Galician-Portuguese.

Today, the movement that managed to prevail at the institutional level was the secessionist one, as a result of a decision made without consensus by People's Alliance, the predecessor of the People's Party. Thus, by means of the Filgueira Decree, a Galician with a Castilian-based orthography was made official.

On the other hand, there is also Eonavian secessionism. The Academy of the Asturian Language and the Government of the Principality of Asturias promote the idea that the Galician variety spoken in the Eo-Navia comarca is a separate language, and they use Asturianized linguistic norms for this speech variety.

Portugal, a former southern county split from the Kingdom of Galicia and fief of the Kingdom of León, was created by Afonso I of Portugal in 1126 and expanded towards the Islamic south, like its neighbouring kingdoms. That part of Galicia, named Portugal, became independent while the northern part of the country remained under the Kingdom of León during the 12th century and early 13th century. Northern Galicia would later be ruled by the Kingdom of Castile, which would become the core and ethnic base for the future Spain; but the culture was the same on both sides of the political border. Galician-Portuguese culture attained great prestige during the Low Middle Ages. In the late 15th century, Castilian domination became more severe, banishing their language in all official uses, including the church.

Galician-Portuguese survived diglossically for the following centuries among the peasant population, but it experienced a strong Spanish influence and had a different evolution. Meanwhile, the same language (by the reintegrationist view) remained fully official in Portugal and was carried across the world by Portuguese explorers, soldiers and colonists.

During the 19th century a revival movement arose. This movement defended the Galician language, and created a provisional norm, with a Castilian orthography and many loanwords. When autonomy was granted, a norm and orthography (based in rexurdimento writers) (Galician literature) for a Galician language was created. This norm is taught and used in schools and universities of Galicia. But most writers (Castelao, Risco, Otero Pedrayo) did not support the traditional Galician forms; some of them based on Spanish orthography even if they recognized the essential linguistic unity, saying that the priority was achieving political autonomy and being read by the population. Other writers wrote with a Portuguese-like orthography (e.g. Guerra da Cal and Carvalho Calero).

Reintegrationists claim that the official norm (released in 1982) was imposed by the Spanish government, with the covert intent of severing Galician from Portuguese. But this idea is rejected by the Real Academia Galega, which supports the official norm.

Reintegrationist and Lusist groups are protesting against this so-called language secessionism, which they call Castrapism (from castrapo, something like "patois") or Isolationism. Unlike in the case of Valencian Blaverism, isolationism has no impact in the scientific community of linguists, and it is supported by a small number of them but still has clear political support.

Galician-Portuguese linguistic unity until the 16th century seems to be consensus, as does both Galician and European Portuguese being closer to each other, and also closer in the 19th century than in the 20th century and now. In this period, while Galician for the most part lost vowel reduction, velarization of /l/ and nasal vowels, and some speech registers of it adhered to yeísmo, all making it phonologically closer to Spanish. For example, European Portuguese had splits that created two new vowel phonemes, one of them usually an allophone only in the case of vowel reduction and the other phonetically absent in any other variant. Some dialects had a merger of three of its oral diphthongs and another three of its nasal vowels, and together with Brazilian Portuguese absorbed more than 5000 loanwords from French as well as 1500 from English.

It seems that the debate for a greater integration among Portuguese-speaking countries had the result of a single writing standard (1990 Portuguese Language Orthographic Agreement), often shunned by some segments of Portuguese media and population but long waited and cheered by Brazilians despite occasional criticism to some aspects and that changed the spelling of between 0.5% and 1% of the words in both former varieties, with minor respect to major dialect phonological differences. The other debate, whether Galician should use the same standard of Portuguese (Lusism), a standard with minor differences (Reintegrationism), a re-approximation of both through another Lusophone spelling agreement that would give particular regional differences such as that of Galician as well as major diverging dialects of Portuguese (especially in South America) more room (Reintegrationism), or the present standard based on the Spanish orthography, still did not cast official attention of government authorities in any of the involved countries, even if Lusophone support is expected to be strong in any of the first three cases.

A point often held by minorities among both Reintegrationists/Lusists and Lusophonists is that Portuguese should have a more conservative and uniform international speech standard that at the same time respects minor phonological differences between its variants (such as a free choice between the various allophones of the rhotic consonant /ʁ/, [a ~ ɐ ~ ɜ ~ ə] for /a ~ ɐ/ or [s ~ s̻ʲ ~ ʃ ~ ɕ] for the voiceless allophone of /S/) that would further strengthen Lusophone integration, but this is not especially welcomed by any party in Europe.

== In Spanish ==
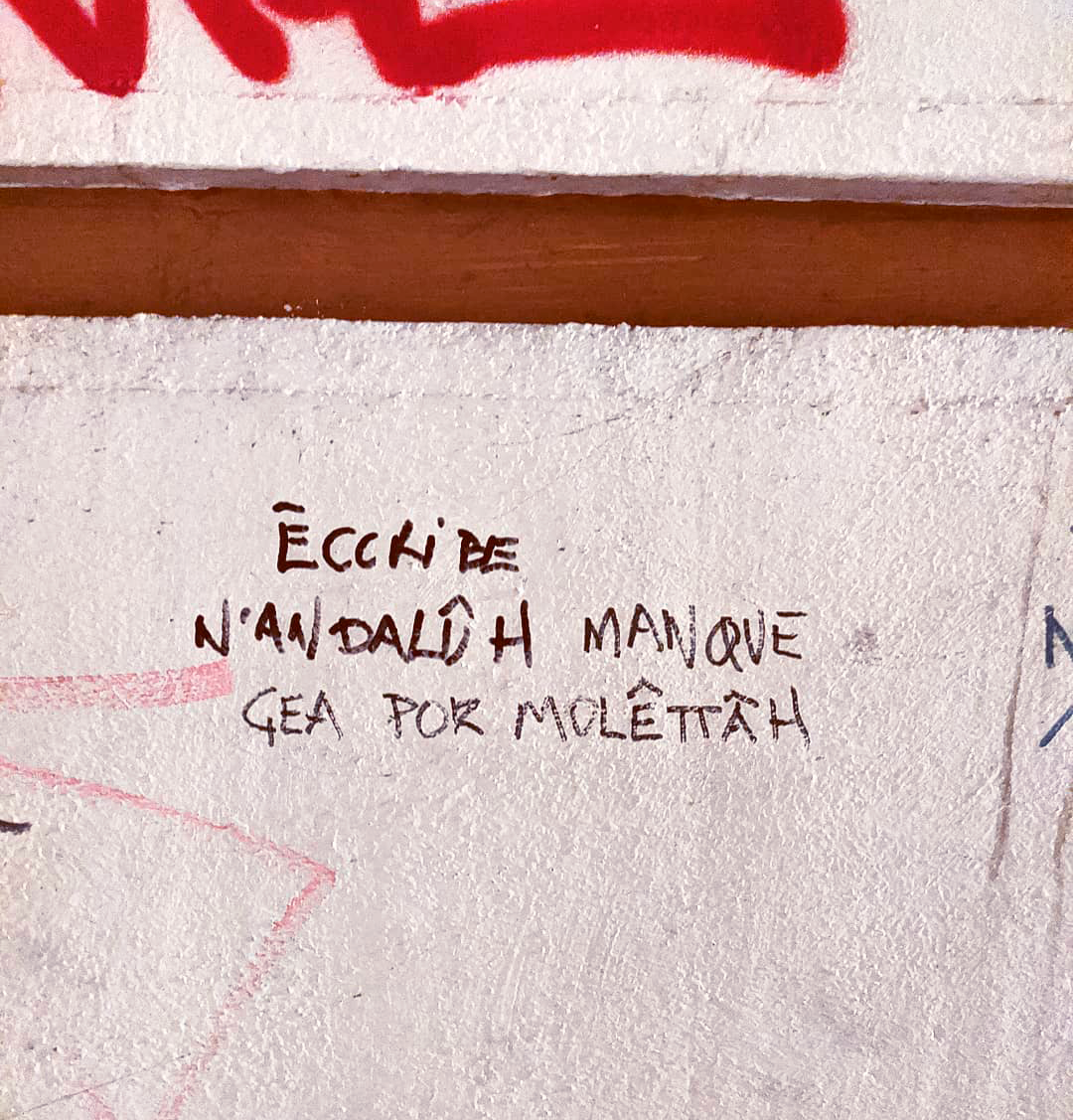
Graffiti in Seville with text in EPA Andalusian. The text says Êccribe n'andalûh manque çea por molêttâh, "Write in Andalusian even if it is only to bother".

In Andalusia, there is a fringe movement aimed at promoting the Andalusian dialect as a separate language from Spanish.

== In Hindi and Urdu ==
The national language of Pakistan and official languages in many parts of India, the Delhi dialect has become the basis of Modern Standard Hindi and Modern Standard Urdu. Grammatically, Hindi and Urdu are the same language, Hindustani, but they differ in their literary and academic vocabulary. Hindi tends to adopt Sanskrit words and purges literary words borrowed from Persian, while Urdu does the opposite. In essence, apart from their scripts, the lexicon is what distinguishes Urdu and Hindi. There are additional Indo-Aryan languages that are counted as Hindi but are not the same as Hindustani. They are considered Hindi languages but may not be close to the Delhi dialect.

== In Romanian ==
The official standard language of Moldova is identical to Romanian. However, Vasile Stati, a local linguist and politician, has asserted his opinion that Moldovan is a separate language in his Dicționar moldovenesc-românesc (Moldovan–Romanian dictionary).

During the Soviet era, the USSR authorities officially recognized and promoted Moldovans and Moldovan as a distinct ethnicity and language from Romanians. A Cyrillic alphabet was introduced in the Moldavian ASSR and SSR to reinforce this claim. Since 1989, the official language switched to the Latin script and underwent several of the language reforms of Romanian.

Nowadays, the Cyrillic alphabet remains in official use only on the territories controlled by the breakaway authorities of the Pridnestrovian Moldavian Republic (most commonly known as Transnistria), where it is named "Moldovan", as opposed to the Latin script version used elsewhere, which the local authorities call "Romanian".

== In Serbo-Croatian ==
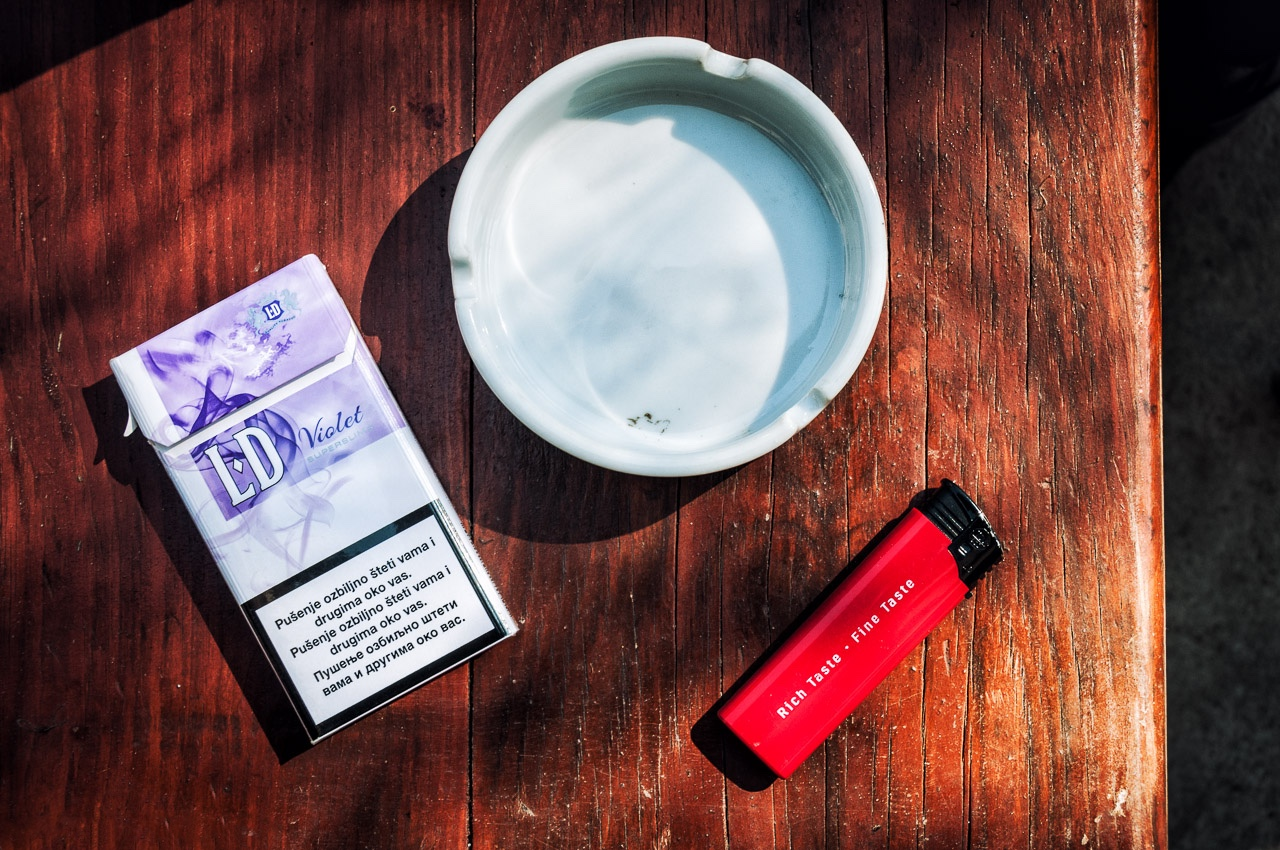
A Bosnian cigarette packet with a warning in three identical languages: Bosnian, Croatian, and Serbian (transliterated into Cyrillic)

Serbo-Croatian, as a standardized form of the Shtokavian dialect, has a strong structural unity, according to the vast majority of linguists who specialize in Slavic languages. However, the language is spoken by populations that have strong, different, ethnic consciousnesses: Bosniaks, Croats, Montenegrins, and Serbs. Since the breakup of Yugoslavia, Serbo-Croatian has lost its unitary codification and its official unitary status. It is now divided into four official languages which follow separate codifications: Bosnian, Croatian, Montenegrin, and Serbian. This process has been accused of being grounded on pseudoscientific claims fueled by political agendas.

Indeed, linguists and sociolinguists have not ceased to speak of a common Serbo-Croatian. It is a pluricentric language being cultivated through four voluntarily diverging normative varieties, Croatian, Bosnian, Montenegrin and Serbian, which are sometimes considered Ausbau languages. However, Ausbau languages must have different dialect basis, whereas standardized Croatian, Bosnian, Montenegrin and Serbian have the same supradialect basis (Shtokavian with regional differences).

The problems of the so-called Ausbau-languages in Heinz Kloss's terminology are similar, but by no means identical to the problems of variants. In Ausbau-languages we have pairs of standard languages built on the basis of different dialects [...]. The difference between these paired Ausbau-languages and standard language variants lies in the fact that the variants have a nearly identical material (dialectal) basis and the difference is only in the development of the standardisation process, while paired standard languages have a more or less distinct dialect base.

Kloss contrasts Ausbau languages not only with Abstand languages but also with polycentric standard languages, i.e. two variants of the same standard, such as Serbo-Croatian, Moldavian and Rumanian, and Portuguese in Brazil and Portugal. In contrast, pairs such as Czech and Slovak, Bulgarian and Macedonian, and Danish and Swedish, are instances of literary standards based on different dialects which, at a pre-literate stage, would have been regarded by linguists as dialects of the same language.

On the contrary, the Serbo-Croatian kind of language secessionism is now a strongly consensual and institutional majority phenomenon. Still, this does not make it legitimate to say that such secessionism has led to "Ausbau languages" in the cases of Croatian, Bosnian, Montenegrin and Serbian, because such diversion has not taken place:

The intercomprehension between these standards exceeds that between the standard variants of English, French, German, or Spanish.

The four varieties - Bosnian, Croatian, Montenegrin, and Serbian - are all totally mutually comprehensible [...] What there is, is a common, polycentric standard language - just like, say, French, which has Belgian, Swiss, French, and Canadian variants but is definitely not four different languages. [...] Linguistic scientists are agreed that BCSM is essentially a single language with four different standard variants bearing different names.

== In Tagalog ==
Republic Act No. 7104, approved on August 14, 1991, created the Commission on the Filipino Language, reporting directly to the President and tasked to undertake, coordinate and promote researches for the development, propagation and preservation of Filipino and other Philippine languages. On May 13, 1992, the commission issued Resolution 92-1, specifying that Filipino is the

...indigenous written and spoken language of Metro Manila and other urban centers in the Philippines used as the language of communication of ethnic groups.

Though the Commission on the Filipino Language recognizes that a lot of the vocabulary of Filipino is based on Tagalog, the latest definition given to the national language tries to evade the use of the term Tagalog.

According to some Filipinologists (people who specialize in the study of Filipino as a language), the main reason that Filipino is distinct from Tagalog is that in Filipino, there is a presence of vocabulary coming from other Philippine languages, such as Cebuano (such as bana – husband), Hiligaynon (such as buang – insane) and Ilocano (such as ading – little brother). They also maintain that the term Tagalog is the language of the Tagalog region and puristic in a sense. It lacks certain phonemes like /f/ and /v/, which makes it incapable of producing some indigenous proper nouns Ifugao and Ivatan. Curiously, proponents of language secessionism are unable to account for the glaring absence of long vowel, phonemic in Tausug, in Filipino phonology or for the absence of a schwa. Arguments for secessionism generally ignore the fact that the various languages of the Philippines have divergent phonologies.

== In Chinese ==
=== Mandarin versus other Chinese varieties ===
Among Chinese speakers, Yue Chinese (Cantonese), Hokkien and other varieties of Chinese are often referred to as dialects (Chinese: 方言), instead of languages (simplified Chinese: 语言; traditional Chinese: 語言), despite the fact that those varieties are not mutually intelligible with Mandarin, spoken by the majority of Chinese. However, the languages are reportedly significantly more mutually intelligible in written form as all varieties continue to use the same set of Hanzi (Chinese characters); i.e. Yue and Mandarin differ primarily in tonal differences and different pronunciations of various sounds which would be largely negated in writing.

=== In Hokkien ===
In the Hokkien topolect (Chinese: 閩南語), which is widely used in Fujian, Taiwan, and in the Chinese diaspora, it is debated that whether Taiwanese dialects (Chinese: 臺灣閩南語) should be separated from the Hokkien language as the Taiwanese language (or Taigi, Chinese: 臺灣話 or 臺語), although people from Fujian and Taiwan can communicate with each other despite some differences in vocabulary. Such debates may be associated with politics of Taiwan.

In Taiwan, there is a common perception that Hokkien preserves more archaic features from Classical Chinese than Mandarin, thus allowing poetry from the Tang dynasty to rhyme better. Amongst Hokkien nationalists in Taiwan, this perception is sometimes elevated into stronger claims about the identity of Hokkien and Mandarin. One common name for Taiwanese Hokkien in Taiwan, especially among elderly speakers, is Chinese: 河洛話; pinyin: Héluòhuà, derived from a folk etymological reading of Hok-ló, Ho̍h-ló, or Hô-ló. The character reading is interpreted to be a reference to the Yellow River Map and the Lo Shu Square and taken as evidence that the ancestors of Hokkien-speaking people came from the Central Plain, and in preserving their identity over the centuries, Hokkien speakers have also better preserved their language. Some fringe scholars claim that modern Hokkien is a faithfully preserved archaic variety of Chinese once used in the imperial courts dating back as early as the Shang dynasty. Another claim based on folk etymology is that the word Mandarin is based on the Mandarin pronunciation of the Chinese phrase Chinese: 滿大人; pinyin: Mǎndàrén; lit. 'important Manchu person or Manchu official'. This is taken as evidence that Mandarin has been corrupted by foreign influence from Manchu, Mongolian, etc. and is thus not fit to be the official language of a Chinese-speaking country. This is in contrast to more mainstream views that Taiwanese Hokkien, as a variety of Southern Min, is a descendant of Proto-Min, a language that split from late Old Chinese, and Mandarin descended from Middle Chinese, and that it is not meaningful to say that one modern language is older than another.

In 2021, some supporters of Taigi separated from Min Nan Chinese (for example, ÌTHUÂN KHOKI Co., Ltd.) applied the following two requests to ISO 639 Maintenance Agency in order to make Taigi get individual ISO 639-3 code. After reviewing, the agency partially adopted the two requests, while Taigi can't get its independent code:

- Change Request id 2021-045, which would split nan into 11 codes, such as lnx (Liongna), luh (Luichew), oan (Taigi), etc. The decision of the agency effective from October 15, 2024 is: luh and hnm (Hainanese) is added into zho (Chinese) the macrolanguage, other changes are rejected.
- Change Request id 2021-044, which would create "ftg", an independent code for Taigi. The decision of the agency effective from October 15, 2026 is: the request for adding "ftg" new code to ISO 639 are rejected, because they didn't receive sufficient evidence that separate development from other varieties of Min Nan Chinese warranted a distinct individual language code for Taigi. However, "Taiwanese" and "Taigi" is added to the additional names for the ISO 639-3 code "nan".

== See also ==
- Abstand and ausbau languages
- Altaic languages
- Blaverism
  - Norms of El Puig
- Comparison of Serbo-Croatian standard varieties
- Dialect continuum
- Diasystem
- Diglossia
- Language ideology
- Language planning
- Language policy
- Language shift
- Mutual intelligibility
- Norwegian language conflict
- Pluricentric language
- Separatism
- Slovjak movement
- Standard for Andalusian (Êttandâ pal andalûh)
- Standard language
