= Chirigota =

Genre of Spanish choral folksong

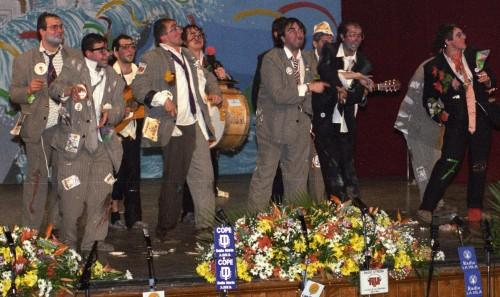
“El que la lleva la entiende: The one who wears it understands it”

Chirigota is a genre of Spanish choral folksong originating in the Province of Cádiz. The songs are satirical in nature and are performed predominantly in the streets by costumed performers during the annual two week carnival. It has been described as a vehicle for gossip and public comment, especially of a political or moral, and sometimes prurient, nature. Suppressed during the Francoist State until 1948, along with carnival in general, there has been a massive resurgence of the art-form since his death and the re-establishment of democracy.

Politicians are often the objects and subjects of the songs. In 2012 an entire repertoire of the chirigota group "Los Gordillos" was devoted to Juan Manuel Sánchez Gordillo, the anarcho-communist mayor of Marinaleda, a utopian village in central Andalusia. The twelve members were dressed as the mayor, Juan Manuel Sánchez Gordillo, and offered songs about supermarket raids led by him that summer to dramatize the increasing poverty in the countryside.
