= Unitarian Candidacy of Workers =

Unitarian Candidacy of Workers Candidatura Unitaria de Trabajadores
- Founder: Juan Manuel Sánchez Gordillo
- Founded: 1979
- Headquarters: 45 Miguel Cid St., Seville
- Newspaper: Cutopia
- Ideology: Libertarian communism Andalusian nationalism Andalusian soberanism Internationalism; Anti-capitalism; Anti-Atlanticism
- Political position: Far-left
- National affiliation: United Left (1986–2015, 2018–present)
- Regional affiliation: Adelante Andalucía (2018–2020)
- Trade union affiliation: Andalusian Workers' Union
- Colors: Green, white, red
- Slogan: For an Andalusian left bloc
- City Council of Marinaleda: 6 / 11
- Parliament of Andalusia: 0 / 109

Website
- lacut.org

The Unitarian Candidacy of Workers (Spanish: Candidatura Unitaria de Trabajadores, CUT) is a libertarian communist and Andalusian nationalist party in Andalusia, Spain. Founded in 1979 with the name Collective for the Unity of Workers – Andalusian Left Bloc (Colectivo de Unidad de los Trabajadores-Bloque Andaluz de Izquierdas, CUT-BAI), they were one of the founding members of United Left since 1986 until they left in 2015, rejoining the organization in 2018. CUT's longtime leader was Juan Manuel Sánchez Gordillo, mayor of Marinaleda, Seville from 1979 to 2023.

== History ==
In the IV Congress of the CUT-BAI, held in January 2014 in Seville, the party decided to rename itself, adopting the name Candidatura Unitaria de Trabajadores (Unitarian Candidacy of Workers).

On February 12, 2015, the CUT decided to abandon United Left because of their disagreement with the 'politicy of pacts' between this formation and PSOE. Although they also decided not to join any other party or coalition, the CUT asked to vote for Podemos, and participated in the lists of this party. Two candidates of the CUT were elected in the Parliament of Andalusia, María García and Libertad Benitez. In the 2016 Spanish general election, CUT entered the Spanish Cortes Generales for the first time, as the party vice-leader and former mayor of El Coronil, Seville, Diego Cañamero, was elected as a deputy for the Jaén district running on the Unidos Podemos candidacy. In the 2018 Andalusian regional election, only María García ran for re-election holding her Parliament seat of Seville.
