= Real Colegio Seminario del Corpus Christi =

Coordinates: 39°28′21″N 0°22′24″W

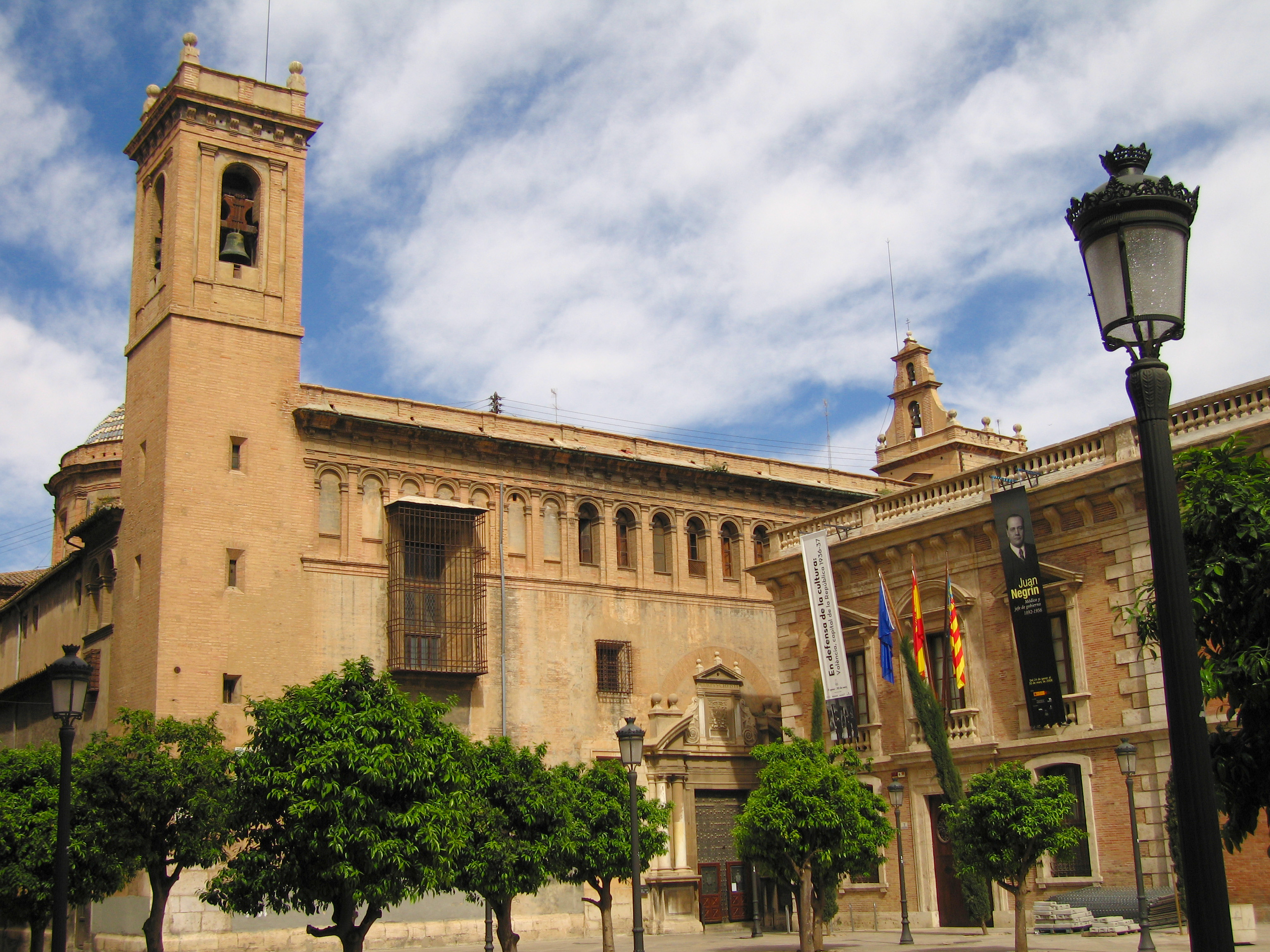
College of Corpus Christi and the Patriarch Museum.

The Real Colegio Seminario del Corpus Christi (Royal College and Seminary of Corpus Christi) is a former Roman Catholic school and seminary founded in 1583 in the Spanish city of Valencia. It is located in calle de la Nau in the old city, opposite La Nau, the former Universidad Literaria.

== History ==
The college complex was built between 1586 and 1615. It is structured around a large renaissance cloister enclosing the church, the communion chapel, the library, the sleeping quarters and the classrooms. There is another courtyard at the back and a small belfry is located in the corner of the plaza. The Patriarch was designated a National Monument in 1962 and a Monument of Cultural Interest in 2007, and remains a principal example of the Italian influence on renaissance architecture in Spain.

Part of the building now hosts the Museum of the Patriarch. Of special note in the Patriarch Museum are paintings by Caravaggio, El Greco (Adoration of the Shepherds), Van Der Teyden, Benlliure, Ribalta and Pinazo, as well as an original manuscript by Sir Thomas More. Also preserved there is the only surviving copy of the 1592 world map by the notable Dutch-Flemish astronomer, cartographer and Protestant clergyman Petrus Plancius, titled "Nova et exacta Terrarum Orbis Tabula geographica ac hydrographica".

Archbishop of Valencia Juan de Ribera, who founded the institution, arranged housing there for the Franciscan nun, mystic Sr. Margarita Agullona (1536 - 1600) so he could bear witness to her mystical raptures and for 25 years. When she died, he had her remains moved there. "He ordered in February 1605, that the body of the Venerable, who was incorrupt, be moved, and arranged that a burning lamp always burned before her sepulcher."

== See also ==
- 16th-century Western domes
