= Norms of El Puig =

Valencian linguistic norms

The Norms of El Puig (Valencian: Normes d'El Puig), also known as Norms of the RACV (Valencian: Normes de la RACV), are the linguistic rules developed by the Royal Academy of Valencian Culture (RACV) (Valencian: Real Acadèmia de Cultura Valenciana) proposed for Valencian treated as an independent language, as opposed to a variety of Catalan. The Norms were presented in 1981 at the Monastery of Santa Maria in El Puig and were drafted with the intention of regulating the Valencian language in accordance with and encompassing both the linguistic reality of present-day Valencian as well as longstanding Valencian literary and orthographic tradition. The Norms of El Puig were the official Valencian standard in the early 80s, and have been promoted by the Valencian Governments at various times. Nowadays, they are used by some publishers, associations and taught by the cultural society Lo Rat Penat that issues its own qualifications in Valencian.

== Use ==
The Norms of El Puig were developed by the Section of Language and Literature of the RACV in 1979 and presented in a formal act in El Puig in 1982. The Norms were made the official standard of Valencian in 1980 by the Valencian President Enrique Monsonís (UCD), and they were particularly promoted by the Councilor of Education of the Valencian Community Amparo Cabanes. That was the time when the Valencian Statue of Autonomy of 1982 was published using these norms for its version in Valencian. The Valencian government enacted that language teachers of Valencian in the educational system had to have a linguistic qualification in these Norms, issued mainly by Lo Rat Penat. Nevertheless, just with the arrival of the Socialist Party in December 1982, the Norms of Castelló, that use the Catalan unitarian linguistic forms, were reintroduced, the Valencian teachers with the qualifications in the normative of the RACV were fired, and its qualifications invalidated.

In 2015, the Valencian government of the PPCV passed a law to protect Valencian identity features that protected and promoted the Valencian traditions and language. In this law the Norms of El Puig and the RACV were given public protection, promotion and teaching recognition. The opposition accused the Valencian government of being biased and electioneering, and a new Valencian coalition government abrogated the law in 2016.

The Norms of El Puig have been less used than the official normative. Some cultural organisations have used the Norms, like the Junta Central Fallera from 1992 to 1998, although its use has declined since its substitution by the Normes de Castelló, and the subsequent creation of the Acadèmia Valenciana de la Llengua (AVL) in 1998 which follows them. In 2004, the production in the Norms of El Puig was two times the production of other minority languages like Aranese and Aragonese, although it was doubled by the production in Asturian.

The Norms of El Puig are still used in different publications related to the Royal Academy of Valencian Culture, association with the patronage of several cultural and political personalities. The cultural association Lo Rat Penat, and some publishing houses use these norms in its publications. Besides, the rules are defended by the Valencian regionalism in favour of language secessionism. The Internet has also given new opportunities of diffusion to the Norms of El Puig. There is also an encyclopedia on the Internet created by volunteers using the MediaWiki software, called L'Enciclopèdia in Valencian, which was created in December 2007 and is written using these Norms.

In 2020, Walter de Gruyter published the Manual of Standardization in the Romance Languages, in which devoted a subsection inside the Valencian normative grammars called Other attempts at standardization, where they analysed these rules as "an independent standard based on the secessionist orthography of Normes d'El Puig (1981)". In their conclusion they showed the different codification attempts of Catalan and Valencian linguistics including the New Valencian Grammar (NGLV) (2015) of the RACV.

== Orthography ==
There is significant overlap between the Normes d'El Puig and the AVL's orthographic standards. This section calls out various key differences.

In respect to the alphabet and units of writing (such as digraphs), the main differences come about in terms of:

- the names of the letters
- how the consonants /tʃ, dʒ/ and the glide /j/ are written
- representation of word-final /p, t, k/ originating from voiced consonants
- treatment of various older digraphs and consonant groups

=== Alphabet ===
The table below summarizes the main differences between the two norms as far as the letter names go. Where multiple forms are given in a single cell, the value listed first is the form deemed most preferable in the pertinent standard. The forms given in the "Non-preferred" column are deemed by the RACV as "admissible" but also Castilianisms.

Letter		Name(s) per the Normes d'El Puig		Name(s) per the AVL
Letter		Preferred	Non-preferred	Name(s) per the AVL
Ç	ç	cedeta ce trencada		ce trencada
F	f	ef efe		efe, efa ef
H	h	hac	haig	hac
K	k	ka		ca
L	l	el ele		ele, ela el
M	m	em eme		eme, ema em
N	n	en ene		ene, ena en
R	r	er erre		erre, erra er
S	s	es esse		esse, essa es
X	x	eix xe	equis	ics, xeix

In respect to the letters F, L, M, N, R and S: The forms ef, el, em, en, er, es are preferred by the RACV, as they are deemed the traditional Valencian forms in addition to being the Classical Latin names for the letters. The forms efe, ele, eme, ene, erre, esse, being present in the spoken language, are also admissible in the RACV's standard but are deemed Castilianisms, originating from Castilian as adaptations of the Latin names to Castilian phonology. The forms efa, ela, ema, ena, essa, erra, essa are inadmissible in the RACV's standard, being deemed influence from Catalan and themselves deemed Eastern Catalan adaptations of the Castilian forms.

==== Palatals ====
One prominent aspect of the Normes d'El Puig as compared to the Normes de Castelló is the differences in writing the glide [j] and the palato-alveolar consonants /dʒ/ and /tʃ/.

===== Palatal glide =====
The glide [j] is generally written in the Norms of El Puig with the letter Y, as opposed to I. Word-final instances of [j] are generally written with I in both the Normes d'El Puig and the Normes de Castelló, except in certain toponyms and surnames to keep tradition.

The Normes d'El Puig also use y to write the [j] of those certain words that instead start with /dʒ/ or /ʒ/ in Catalan (such as yo 'I' and ya 'yet, already'), rather than with j as in the Normes de Castelló. In a similar vein, the initial consonant in -jecc- and -ject- appearing in intervocalic contexts (such as in trayecte 'trajection' and proyecte 'project', but not objecte 'object' or abjecció 'abjection') is written with y rather than j, reflecting the RACV's norm of this being pronounced with [j] rather than with /dʒ/ as in the AVL's norm.

The table below compares the two norms in this regard.

Valencian sound	Context/Property	Normes d'El Puig	Normes de Castelló	Gloss
[j] (Catalan /dʒ/ ~ /ʒ/)	word-initial	yo	jo	'I'
[j] (Catalan /dʒ/ ~ /ʒ/)	word-initial	ya	ja	'yet, already'
[j] (/dʒ/ in the AVL's norm)	word-internal, intervocalic	proyecte	projecte	'project'
[j]	word-initial	yayo	iaio	'grandpa'
[j]	word-internal, pre-consonant	àcit peryòdic	àcid periòdic	'periodic acid'
[j]	word-internal, intervocalic	joya	joia	'joy'
[j]	word-internal, intervocalic; in contact with /i/ from derivational suffixes	tramoyiste	tramoiste	'stagehand (masc.)'
[j]	word-internal, intervocalic; in contact with /i/ from derivational suffixes	onomatopèyic /onomatopɛjik/	onomatopeic /onomatopɛjk/	'onomatopoeic'
[j]	word-final	rei		'king'
[j]	stem-final, derivations of words ending in [j]	reina		'queen'
[j]	word-final toponyms, surnames	Alcoy	Alcoi	'Alcoi'
[j]	stem-final, derivations of words ending in [j] that maintain traditional y	alcoyà	alcoià	'Alcoian, of or pertaining to Alcoi'

==== Word ending ====
The Norms of El Puig write at the end of the words simply t, c, p. They do not make the written distinction at the end of the word between t-d, c-g, p-b of the Norms of Castelló, which is not kept in the oral language (pronounced as /t/, /k/, /p/ respectively in all Valencian phonetics standards).

- Norms of El Puig: pot, fret (both /t/); llop, aljup (both /p/); amic, fanc (both /k/).
- Normes de Castelló: pot, fred (both /t/); llop, aljub (both /p/); amic, fang (both /k/).

==== Digraphs ====
Digraph	Name(s)
ch	che ce hac
gu	ge u
ig	i ge
ll	ell, elle doble el
ny	eny, enye en i grega
qu	cu u
rr	doble er, doble erre
ss	doble es, doble esse

- Most notably, the digraph ch is regularly employed in the RACV's norm to represent /tʃ/ (in addition to its occasional use to represent /k/ in fossilizations, such as in the traditional spellings of certain last names): pancha ('belly'), chocolate ('chocolate'), chiquet ('child'). Unlike in the AVL's standard where /tʃ/ is normally represented by x and tx.
- Simplification of the digraphs ŀl, tl, tll, tm, tn, tg, tj, tz, and the group -mpt- using only the simple letter that already represents its sound, like metge, platja, compte being mege, plaja, conte.
- Keeping the use of s in the suffix -isar like: organisar, normalisat; instead of the digraph tz.

=== Apostrophe ===
In general (within both the AVL's standard as well as the RACV's), the singular definite articles el, lo and la, the personal articles en and na, and the preposition de ('of') elide to l' and d' respectively when used before nominals that begin with a vowel sound or a silent h preceding a vowel sound. This elision does not occur before instances of vowels pronounced as a glide, such as in the phrase la Huitava del Corpus ('the Huitava del Corpus', a certain Valencian religious celebration) or el dia de hui ('today, the day of today').

Unlike in the AVL's standard, however, the feminine definite article la exhibits the aforementioned elision before nominals that begin with unstressed i or u.

=== Accent marks ===
In the function of using accent marks to distinguish homophones or senses, the Norms of El Puig can differ from the AVL's standard in terms of which words are to be accentuated or what senses call for accentuation. Consider the following examples:

Gloss	Normes d'El Puig	AVL Standard
woman	dòna	dona
gives, give!	dona	dóna
fire	fòc	foc
lightbulb	foc	foc

Examples of other differences are as follows:

- Words ending in stressed -in bear no accent mark, unlike in the AVL's standard.
- The word qué ('what') is spelled with an acute accent instead of a grave accent mark, reflecting the Valencian pronunciation with /e/ instead of /ɛ/
- The interrogatives a ón, quàn, and cóm are accentuated when used to form questions or exclamations (whether direct or indirect) whereas the AVL's standard leaves them unaccented.

== Grammar ==
=== Articles ===
Some key differences present in the RACV's norms compared to the AVL's norms around the articles are as follows:

- Acceptance of the masculine article lo, a classic form that is widely used only the northernmost parts of the Valencian Community. In general, the Valencian article lo is recommended occasionally after the prepositions en, per and some adverbs: en lo coche, tot lo món ('in the car', 'everybody').
- Acceptance of the neuter article lo in all registers of the language and as systematically distinct from the masculine article. This form which was already used in the classical language is considered as necessary to avoid confusion: lo bo (meaning something good), el bo (meaning someone good).

=== Demonstratives ===
Some differences present in the RACV's norms compared to the AVL's norms around the demonstratives are:

- Rejection of the reinforced demonstratives aquest 'this' and aqueix 'that' from the modern language, deeming them archaic and permitting only their simple counterparts est(e) and eix(e).
- Permitting that the simple demonstratives este 'this' and eixe 'that' be written without the final -e (est and eix) before a vowel sound, reflecting the tendency to pronounce them without the final vowel in this context: est estiu ('this summer'), eix home ('that man').

=== Possessives ===
The main divergence between the norms regarding the possessives is that:

- The RACV standard only accepts the feminine form with u like seua and does not admit any possessive formed with v.
- The RACV emphasises much more the use and conservation of the atonic possessives used before kinship, the words casa ('house'), vida ('life'), idioms, and tittles: ma mare ('my mother'), mon yayo ('my grandfather'), ta vida ('your life'), Sa Magestat ('His Majesty'). Besides, the RACV recognises the atonic possessives in the plural persons: sos tios ('their aunt and uncle'), nostra casa ('our house').
- The possessive for the third person llur(s) is an archaic form which is no part of its standard.

=== Numerals ===
Some key differences present in the RACV's norms compared to the AVL's norms around the numerals are as follows:

- Writing the cardinal numeral for '1' only as u rather than as un/u.
- Deeming of the feminine cardinal form dues 'two' as obsolete, thereby treating the masculine form dos as wholly invariant.
- Only accepting huit and díhuit and rejecting the forms vuit and dívuit never used in Valencian.
- Writing the cardinal numeral for '19' as dèneu rather than as dènou, reflecting the modern Valencian pronunciation thereof.
- Writing the cardinal '60' as xixanta and the cardinal one million as milló instead of seixanta and milió.
- Rejection of the ordinals formed with -é or è deeming them obsolete and alien and preferring the Latinate ordinals in their stead:

	RACV's ordinals	AVL's preferred ordinals
1st	primer, primera	
2nd	segon (feminine normally invariable)	segon, segona
3rd	tercer tercera	
4th	quart, quarta	
5th	quint, quinta	cinqué, cinquena
6th	sext, sexta	sisé, sisena
7th	sèptim, sèptima	seté, setena
8th	octau, octava	huité, huitena
9th	nové, novena	nové, novena
10th	dècim, dècima	desé, desena
11th	undècim, undècima	onzé, onzena
12th	duodècim, duodècima	dotzé, dotzena
13th	dècim tercer, dècima tercera	tretzé, tretzena
20th	vigèsim, vigèsima	vinté, vintena

=== Pronouns ===
Some key differences present in the RACV's norms compared to the AVL's norms are as follows:

- Acceptance of additional forms of the first-person and second-person plural pronouns over nosaltres and vosaltres, the latter two of which are deemed archaic:

Person	Gloss	Form	Register
1st pl.	we	nosatres	formal
1st pl.	we	nosatros	neutral (general, standard)
1st pl.	we	mosatros	colloquial
1st pl.	us	nos / mos	general / colloquial
2nd pl.	you (pl.)	vosatres	formal
2nd pl.	you (pl.)	vosatros	neutral (general, standard)

- Regular use of the pronoun forms nos ('us') and vos ('you, plural') in contexts where the AVL's norm permits ens/'ns and vos/us. In particular, the RACV deems ens/'ns and us archaic and "foreign" to present-day Valencian. However, with the motivation of keeping tradition, the RACV permits ens and 'ns in poetry to facilitate metrical composition.
- General use of vosté ('you, formal sg.') and vostés ('you, formal pl.') in place of vós, which the RACV deems to be archaic and only to be used in religious contexts, in reference to persons of very high standing and dignity, and for archaic effect or to otherwise reproduce formalities of the archaic language.
- Use of an invariant mateixa ('self, same'), which is otherwise feminine singular, as the sole form for reinforcing reflexive object complements, even when the object is masculine or plural.
  - S'ho comprà per ad ell mateixa. ('He bought it for himself')
  - Elles pensaven en elles mateixa. ('They thought about themselves.')
- The RACV only admits tot lo món / tot el món ('everyone'), and does not include tothom and the impersonal hom like the AVL.
- Likewise, the RACV only accepts cada u ('each one'), while the AVL prefers cadascú.
- The weak personal pronouns have the main form beginning by consonant as me, te, se or ne before the verb, also possible to invert them and start them by the vocal: me llave les mans / em llave les mans ('I wash my hands'). The AVL only recognises the invers form.
- The adverbial pronoun hi is an obsolete form which is not included in the RACV's standard. It can only be an impersonal pronoun with the verb haver.
- Use of the pronoun and adjective atre ('other') which is a classical and present Valencian form, and exclusion of altre considered a parallel archaic form, which is the one preferred by the AVL's standard.

=== Verbs ===
The AVL has included many Valencian verbal particularities in its standard. However, the RACV's standard goes beyond and around verbs include (but are not limited to):

- The forms of the subjunctive and the imperative for the first person-plural and second-person plural in the second conjugation are frequently formed with a as vingau, instead of e: vingueu. In the third conjugation it is also usual as (que vosatros) digau (dir).
- Use of the x (/ʃ/) followed by consonant instead of s in the verbal tenses like the infinitive, past participle, present, past, subjunctive, and imperative: peixcar, creixcut, consumixc, naixquí, (que tu) ixques, vixca. The AVL’s rules use the s instead of x like pescar, consumisc or visca, although the AVL recognises the tradition of that x and admits the pronunciation of the s as /ʃ/.
- Some verbs keep their root invariable while they are conjugated as nàixer ('to be born') or créixer ('to grow') conjugated like naixcut or (que ell) creixca. The AVL eliminates the i (plus the change of the x by s): nascut, (que ell) cresca.
- The RACV only accepts the morphemes -ix-, -ix for the conjugation of the inchoative verbs: produïxen ('they produce'), (que ells) construïxquen ('that they build') or (ell) consumix ('he consumes'). The normative of the AVL forms them using -eix-, -eix, -is- like: produeixen, consumeix, construisquen. However, the AVL also accepts -ix-, -ix like the RACV if they are not followed by a consonant as (ell) consumix.
- The Valencian verbs do not aggregate an additional a before their root like in conseguir, lliberar, senyalar ('get, reach', 'release', 'lower'). Unlike the preferred forms of the AVL like aconseguir, alliberar, assenyalar.
- Recommendation of the past forms without y (nor i) as fea (fer) ('I did').
- Preference of the forms vares, vàrem, vàreu, varen in forming the periphrastic past tenses over their simpler counterparts vas, vam, vau, van, which are deemed as "having less tradition".

=== Adverbs ===
Among characteristics of the RACV's standards around adverbs include (but are not limited to):

- Use of aixina ('so, thus, like this/that') as the standard form over així, the latter of which is considered archaic, literary and poetic.
- There is divergence in adverbs that indicate temporary nature: ans / adés ('before'), en acabant / despuix ('after'), pronte ('soon'), tart ('late'), mentres ('while'), en això / llavors ('then') etc. Its AVL counterparts abans ('before'), després ('after'), prompte ('soon'), tard ('late'), mentre ('while'), aleshores ('then') are not admitted or not recommended.
- Other adverbs like: avant ('forwards'), arrere ('backwards'), llunt ('far') or prou ('enough'), casi ('almost'), massa ('too much') are the standard forms of the RACV. On the contrary, la AVL admits or prefers: endavant ('forwards'), enrere ('backwards'), lluny ('far'), bastant ('enough'), quasi ('almost'), gaire ('too much').

=== Prepositions and conjunctions ===
Among characteristics of the RACV's standards around prepositions and conjunctions include (but are not limited to):

- Acceptance of ad as a standard variation of a ('to') before pronouns and adverbs starting by a vowel, as well as before algú ('someone') or forms of algun ('some'): ad ell, ad això.
- Full acceptance of the merger of en ('in, on') and ab ('with'; along with its variants ap and am) as en, better conforming to the normal Valencian pronunciation of this preposition as well as to Valencian literary tradition. The spelling of the preposition meaning 'with' as amb, with b, is deemed as having no classical tradition within Valencian and being alien to the present-day language.
- The preposition a is used to mark human and determined direct objects (like Spanish and Occitan): ajude a ma mare; m'he trobat al teu amic ('I help my mother; I have found your friend'). By contrast, the AVL standard tends to eliminate it: ajude ma mare; he trobat el teu amic.
- Use of per a ('for, to') also followed by a verb, expressing purpose: Per a guanyar has d'arribar a la meta ('To win you have to reach the finish line'). In the AVL standard it is preferred only per.
- Some conjunctions are written only in its Valencian form like pero ('but'), puix ('well'), encara que ('although'). The AVL forms però, dons, malgrat are deemed as alien in Valencian.

== Text compared ==
English	Valencian (RACV)	Catalan	Occitan (Languedocian)	Spanish
Mince the meat in the machine (or ask the butcher to do it).	Pique la carn en la màquina (o demane al carnisser que ho faça).	Piqueu la carn a la màquina (o demaneu al carnisser que ho faci).	Picatz la carn en la maquina (o demandatz al maselièr d'o far).	Pique la carne en la máquina (o pida al carnicero que lo haga).
Mix all the stuffing ingredients.	Mescle tots els ingredients del farcit.	Barregeu tots els ingredients del farciment.	Mesclatz tots los ingredietns del fars.	Mezcle todos los ingredientes del relleno.
Lay the hare on a good piece of gauze (it can be bought at the pharmacy).	Estenga la llebre damunt d'un bon tros de gasa (se pot comprar en la farmàcia).	Esteneu la llebre damunt d'un bon tros de gasa (es pot comprar a la farmàcia).	Espandissètz la lèbre sus un bon bocin de gasa (se pòt crompar en la farmacia).	Extienda la liebre encima de un buen trozo de gasa (se puede comprar en la farmacia).
Spread the stuffing inside the animal, wrap it in the gauze.	Repartixca el farcit dins de l'animal, enrolle'l en la gasa.	Repartiu el farciment dins l'animal, enrotlleu-lo dins la gasa.	Repartissètz lo fars dintre l'animal, rotlatz lo dins la gasa.	Reparta el relleno dentro del animal, enróllelo con la gasa.
Tie it not too firmly. Roast the ingredients in the oven.	Lligue'l no massa fort. Faça rostir els ingredients dins del forn.	Lligueu-lo no gaire fort. Feu rostir els ingredients dins el forn.	Ficelatz sensa sarrat tròp. Fasètz rostir los ingredients dins lo forn.	Átelo no demasiado fuerte. Haga rostir los ingredientes dentro del horno.
