= Amparo Cabanes Pecourt =

- Born: 1938 (age 87–88); Valencia, Spain
- Education: Literary University of Valencia
- Occupations: Academic, politician
- Employers: University of Valencia; University of Zaragoza
- Organization: Real Acadèmia de Cultura Valenciana
- Political party: Independent

Councilor Without Portfolio of the Valencian Community
- In office 1 December 1982 – 28 June 1983

Councilor of Education of the Valencian Community
- In office 15 September 1981 – 1 December 1982
- Preceded by: Josep Peris Soler
- Succeeded by: Ciprià Ciscar

Amparo Cabanes Pecourt (born 1938) is a Spanish historian, professor of paleography, writer, and politician. From 1981 to 1983 she was a Councilor of the Valencian Community. In her writings she has defended the position that Valencian is not Catalan.

== Biography ==
Amparo Cabanes Pecourt was born in the fishing district of Valencia. She is a disciple of the medieval historian and philologist Antonio Ubieto Arteta.

She took Baccalaureate and Magisterium studies in Valencia. She obtained the degrees of Philosophy and Letters con premio extraordinario (1962) and Doctor in History (1968), under the direction of Ubieto Arteta at the Literary University of Valencia. She also took Social Graduate studies at the Social School of Valencia (1959–1962). From 1963 to 1983 she taught as a Full Professor at the Faculty of Philosophy and Letters of the University of Valencia, and taught two courses (1979–1982) at that university's School of Nursing.

By means of a national competition she obtained the Chair of Paleography and Diplomacy with a posting at the University of Murcia's Faculty of Philosophy and Letters (1982), passing in September 1983, through a transfer competition, to the Faculty of Philosophy and Letters of the University of Zaragoza, where she remained until her retirement in 2008.

She is a member of the Real Acadèmia de Cultura Valenciana, and from 2009 to 2016 she was director of its History Section.

She is the author of more than 100 publications, most of them dedicated to issues related to Valencian history, culture, and language.

== Political career ==
In 1976, invited by Manuel Sanchis i Guarner to give a lecture on the repopulation of the Kingdom of Valencia based on the apportionment of James I, Cabanes Pecourt threw away the preexisting theories and defended the thesis that more settlers were Aragonese than Catalan, and therefore those who helped him conquer the lands did not speak Catalan.

She became involved in politics at the hand of Fernando Abril Martorell after agreeing in some Valencian meetings to give a solution to the problem of the Valencian language.

From September 1981 to December 1982, she was Councilor of Education in the Council of the Valencian Community presided over by Enrique Monsonís, at the proposal of the UCD, although she accepted the position as an independent. Later, until June 1983, she was a councilor without portfolio in the government chaired by socialist Joan Lerma.

She was part of the electoral lists, as an independent, of the coalition between the Valencian Union and People's Alliance in the 1983 regional elections, although she was not elected as a deputy.

== Selected works ==
- Crónica Latina de los Reyes de Castilla (1964)
- Los monasterios valencianos. Su economía en el siglo XV (1974)
- Documentos de Jaime I de Aragón (1976/1988)
- Llibre del Repartiment del Regne de Valencia (1979–80)
- Tirant lo Blanch de Joanot Martorell (1980)
- Documentos y datos para un estudio toponímico de la Región valenciana (1981)
- Pere III y Valencia (1978)
- Dietari del capellà d'Alfons el Magnànim (1991)
- Vidal Mayor (1997)
- Aureum Opus de Xativa (1998)
- Ausias March i els seus manuscrits (2000)
- Avehinaments (Valencia s. XIV) (2000)
- El beato del abad Banzo, un Apocalipsis aragonés recuperado (2005)
