= Lo Rat Penat =

Valencian cultural society

- Lo Rat Penat
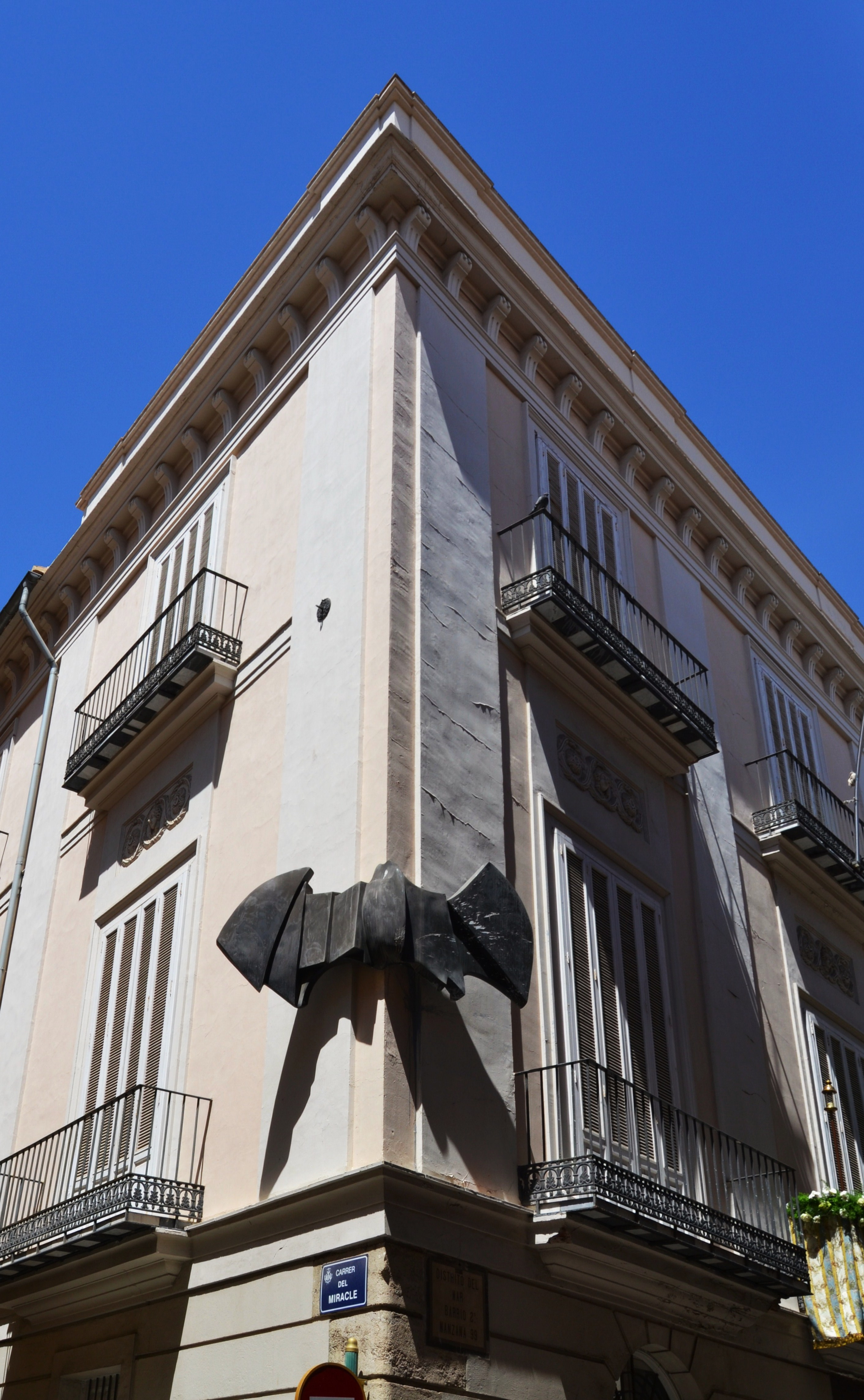
- Headquarters of Lo Rat Penat
- Abbreviation: LRP
- Formation: 1878; 148 years ago
- Founder: Constantí Llombart
- Purpose: Linguistic and cultural promotion
- Headquarters: c/ Trinquet de Caballers 9 Valencia, Spain
- Region served: Valencian Community
- Official language: Valencian
- Website: https://loratpenat.org/

Lo Rat Penat (in English the bat) is a cultural society of the Valencian Community created in 1878 for the teaching, diffusion and preservation of the Valencian language and culture. Its headquarters are located in the city centre of Valencia, and its name refers to the Valencia's heraldic symbol which is a bat.

== Activities ==
Lo Rat Penat holds annual contests, especially during the major festivals of the Valencian Community like its contest of short Falla books, the Alicante's bonfires short books contest, the Saint Vincent miracles theatre contest, or the Roodmas flower crosses contest. In particular, its short Falla books contest (Concurs de Llibrets de Falla) has been recognised by the UNESCO intangible cultural heritage declaration of the Fallas. Lo Rat Penat holds the annual edition of the Valencian Floral games which award the best productions of the Valencian literature. Besides it counts with sections devoted to the Valencian chant, dances, chorus, and publishing.

=== Valencian language ===
The association is devoted to the diffusion, recuperation and teaching of the Valencian language. Lo Rat Penat supports the singularity of the Valencian language as opposed to a variety of Catalan. The association defends, uses, and promotes an alternative codification for Valencian called Norms of El Puig, regulated by the Royal Academy of Valencian Culture (RACV), and calls for its officialization. In this respect, it considers the Royal Academy of Valencian Culture as the authentic regulator of Valencian, and rejects the current official normative institution, the Valencian Academy of the Language (AVL), and its Catalan unitarian standard.

In this field the association organises several courses of Valencian following the Common European Framework of Reference for Languages. Its teaching activity has only been official by the Valencian authorities in the period 1980–1983, and was legally recognised between 2015 and 2016. Ever since Lo Rat Penat calls for the officialization of its Valencian qualifications. Its linguistic and cultural activities have usually had the economic aid of the Valencian administrations, and the association has counted with the support of notable Valencian personalities.

== See also ==
- Norms of El Puig
- Royal Academy of Valencian Culture
