= Juan Manuel Sánchez Gordillo =

Spanish politician (born 1952)

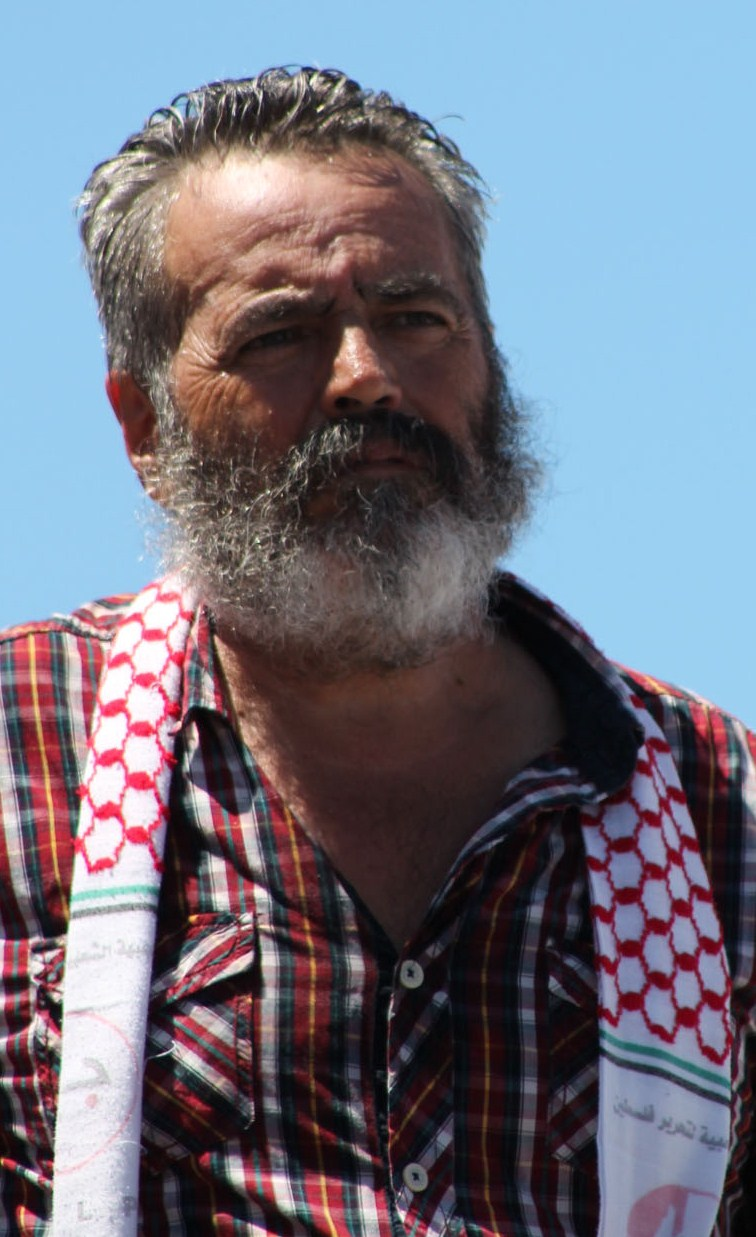

Mayor of Marinaleda
- In office 6 May 1979 – 17 June 2023
- Succeeded by: Sergio Gómez Reyes

Deputy of the Parliament of Andalusia for Seville
- In office 8 July 1994 – 12 March 2000
- In office 13 April 2008 – 26 November 2014

Personal details
- Born: 5 February 1952 (age 74) Marinaleda, Seville, Spain
- Party: Unitarian Candidacy of Workers
- Children: Misrain and Libertad
- Profession: High school history teacher

Juan Manuel Sánchez Gordillo (Spanish: [ˈxwam maˈnwel ˈsantʃeθ ɣoɾˈðiʎo]; born 5 February 1952) is a Spanish politician, labour leader and history school teacher. He was the Mayor of Marinaleda from 1979 to 2023, and MP for United Left (IU) in the Parliament of Andalusia for 12 years. He is the founder and longtime leader of the party Unitarian Candidacy of Workers (CUT), part of UF and the rural workers's union Andalusian Workers' Union.

Sánchez Gordillo has a long history of participating in militant action for the benefit of Spanish working class. He helped to transform Marinaleda from a town blighted by rural poverty into what Sánchez Gordillo himself and The Guardian have described as a "communist utopia", where since the early 1990s there has been no need for mortgages—the town has "virtually full employment, communally owned land and wage equality". In August 2012 the town had only 5% unemployment, mostly recent arrivals and economic migrants, contrasting with the rest of Spain where unemployment is at 25%, and at 34% in Andalusia.

== Career ==
=== Robin Hood raids ===
In mid August 2012, Sánchez Gordillo attracted considerable media attention both within Spain and internationally due to his role in raids on supermarkets in nearby towns, Seville and Cádiz, where food was stolen and handed out to poor families and to food banks. The items stolen were part of a list chiefly made of rice, sugar, pasta, milk, olive oil and flour. Sánchez Gordillo did not personally remove food, but was outside in the car parks while members of his union conducted the raids. Several of these members have been arrested and later released, though Sánchez Gordillo himself has immunity from prosecution. Sánchez Gordillo has however said he is happy to waive his immunity and go to jail for his cause, in fact he said he expected to be jailed in order to make his message spread further. English speaking media have widely reported that Sánchez Gordillo is seen as a hero and a "national celebrity" within Spain, comparing him to Robin Hood. A dissenting voice came from Jonathan Blitzer of the New York Times, who suggested he may fail to live up to the hype and be more like a Don Quixote. Sánchez Gordillo has also been called a modern Robin Hood and "the revolutionary of Andalusia" by several Spanish newspapers, including the center-left El País. Gordillo has been criticised by several Spanish citizens and officials, including Alfonso Alonso, a spokesman for the People's Party in Spain's national parliament, who said "One can’t be Robin Hood and at the same time earning a salary as the sheriff of Nottingham".

=== 2012 anti-austerity march ===
On 16 August, Gordillo set off on a three-week march to Madrid; on the way he planned to occupy banks and to persuade local authorities to default on their debts and refuse to implement austerity. So far this has included a brief occupation of a Unicaja branch in Mancha Real.

=== 2013 sentence ===
In November 2013 a Spanish court sentenced Sánchez Gordillo and four others to seven months in prison for occupying unused military land they wanted to be loaned to farmers hard hit by the economic crisis.
