= Andalusian language movement =

Movement promoting Andalusian Spanish as a distinct language

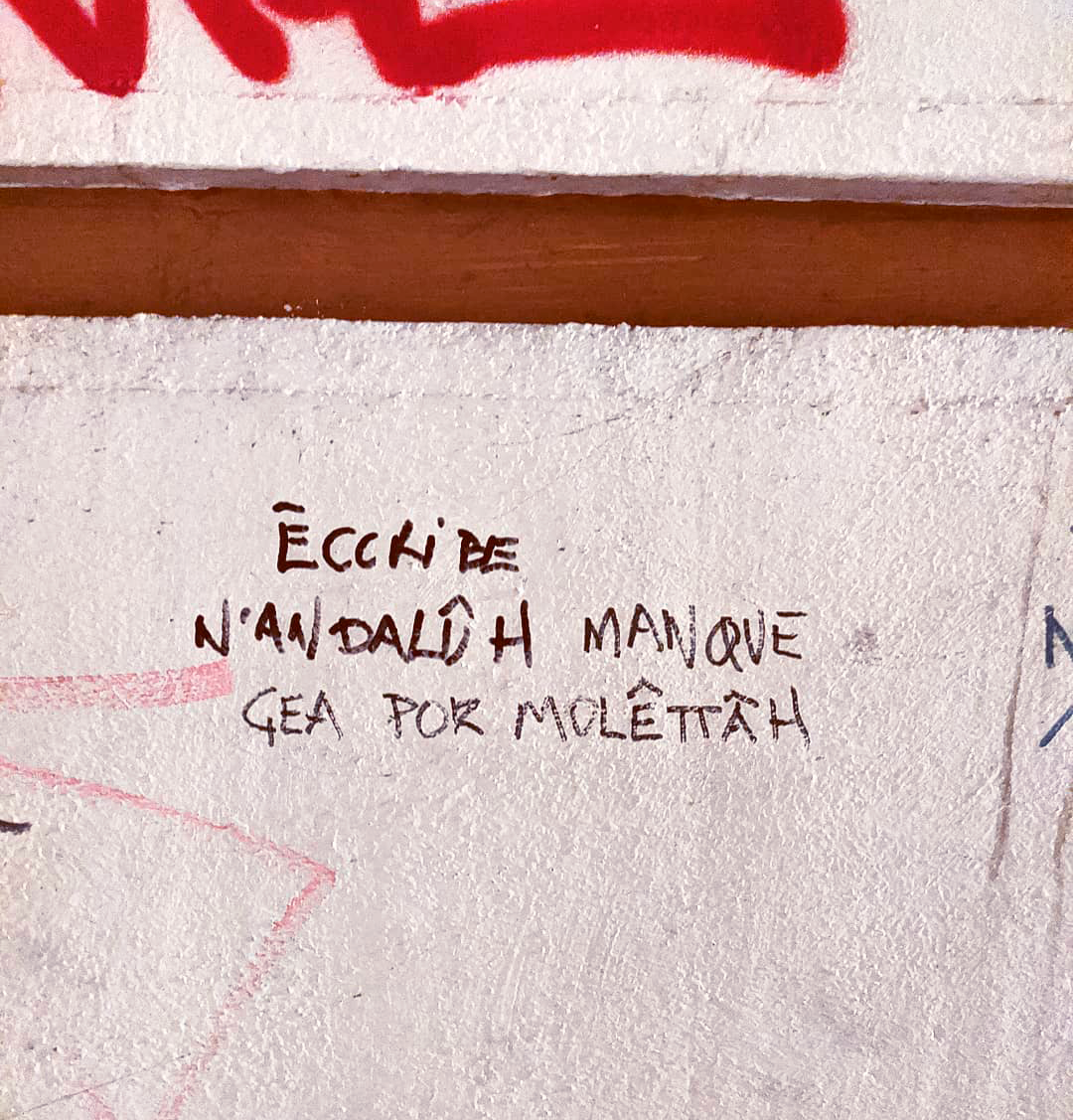
Graffiti in Seville with text in EPA Andalusian. The text says Êccribe n'andalûh manque çea por molêttâh, "Write in Andalusian even if it is only to bother".

A social movement aiming to recognize Andalusian Spanish as an independent language separate from Spanish exists. Prominent advocate groups and organizations include the Society for the Study of Andalusian (ZEA), Er Prinçipito Andalûh (EPA) and AndaluGeeks.

One of the movement's most impactful initiatives is Êttandâ pal andalûh ("Standard for Andalusian"; EPA), a standardized orthographic system for Andalusian which has been used, among other things, to create Andalusian versions of Minecraft, Telegram and Wikipedia.

== Background ==
Andalusian is a language variety that is classified as a dialect of Spanish. However, in recent times, there have been efforts to promote the variety spoken in Andalusia as a language of its own, with its own orthographic norms. The right-wing newspaper Libertad Digital ("Digital Freedom") has accused the movement of only being promoted by the "Andalusian nationalist far-left" and its followers.

== History ==
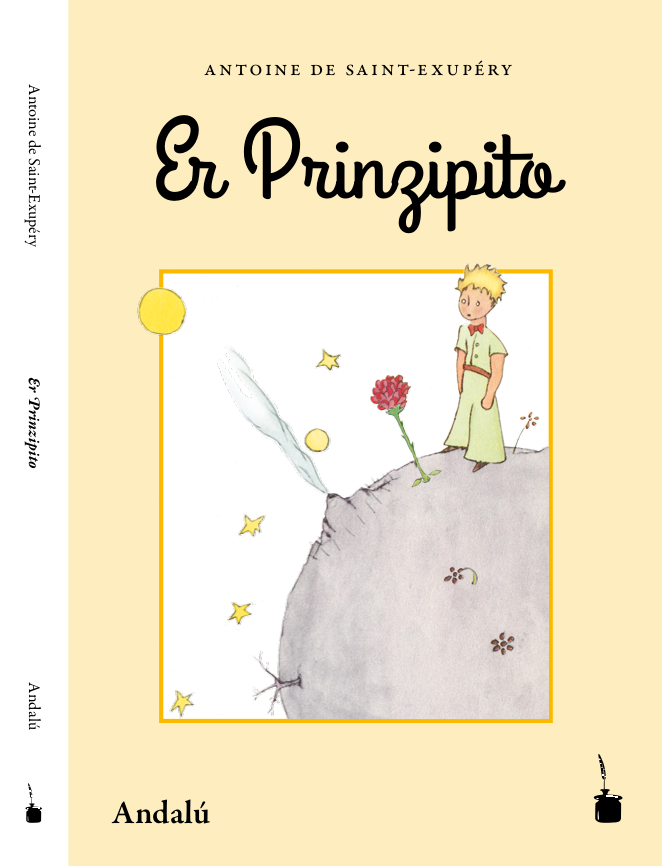
Title page of Er Prinzipito, the Andalusian version of Antoine de Saint-Exupéry's The Little Prince by Juan Porras

Despite having informally started its activities four years earlier, in 2006, the Society for the Study of Andalusian (Sociedad para el Estudio del Andaluz, or Zoziedá' pal Ehtudio' el Andalú; ZEA) was established and drafted its "legal constitution". In a 2008 interview by 20 minutos ("20 minutes"), Guadalupe Vázquez (Guadalupe Bahkeh), member of the ZEA, explained that the members of the organization had been striving for years for "conserving our cultural legacy, something which the statute of autonomy recognizes and which we have absolute certainty that exists with an identity of its own, the Andalusian language". She also explained that the ZEA was integrated by anthropologists, linguists and writers who were "people who are very Andalusist culturally" and who "believe that we are being Castilianized for many years and that if we do not avoid it, Andalusian will end up disappearing". Juan Porras (Huan Porrah), a writer member of the ZEA, was working at the time on a proposal of orthographic norms for Andalusian.

In 2017, Porras published his translation of The Little Prince in Andalusian, being titled Er Prinzipito. It was presented by the Andalusian Workers' Union (SAT) on 9 May of that year. Many users on Twitter mocked the book. As a result of the controversy this book provoked, a Facebook page named after it, Er Prinçipito Andalûh (El Principito Andaluz, "The Andalusian Prince"; EPA), was created, becoming an online gathering point for several linguists, translators and regular Andalusian speakers. Afterwards, this group worked on the creation of an orthographic system aimed at the standardization of Andalusian, Êttandâ pal andalûh (Estándar para el andaluz, "Standard for Andalusian"; also EPA). This later saw the development of a manual transcriber from Spanish to Andalusian, using the EPA system, in 2018. The EPA gained some traction on the Internet, being used by some users in their social media profiles. It also started being used by some artistic and musical groups, such as Califato ¾.

In the summer of 2018, Ksar Feui, a physicist with interests in linguistics, started developing an automatic algorithm for transcribing Spanish to EPA Andalusian. He has praised the EPA as a "historic milestone", and has declared on a 2021 interview by La Voz del Sur that when he found out about the EPA, he transcribed all his earlier literary works to this writing system and then asked a friend to download all words of the dictionary of the Royal Spanish Academy (RAE) to transcribe them to the EPA for developing this algorithm. Feui was joined by several other friends and collaborators, together with whom he started the project AndaluGeeks in 2019, and in February 2019, their algorithm for transcribing Spanish text to EPA Andalusian was published. Afterwards, AndaluGeeks started online courses for learning Andalusian and involved itself in the creation of an Andalusian keyboard for Android with autocorrection and predictive text, an Andalusian dictionary and Andalusian versions of Minecraft, Telegram and Wikipedia, with the latter transcribing all Spanish Wikipedia articles into Andalusian; all of these following the EPA.

In 2021, senator and Adelante Andalucía ("Forward Andalusia") member Pilar González Modino declared in the Senate of Spain that "Andalusian is our natural language. And it is not inferior to any other language of the State. We speak it without complexes." and that "we have, in addition, Andalusian linguists with proposals for an orthography". She later published the same statements on her Twitter account in EPA Andalusian.

== See also ==
- Andalusian nationalism
- Language secessionism
- Languages of Spain
- Valencian language
