= Margarita Agullona =

Roman Catholic nun (1536–1600)

Sr. Margarita Agullona
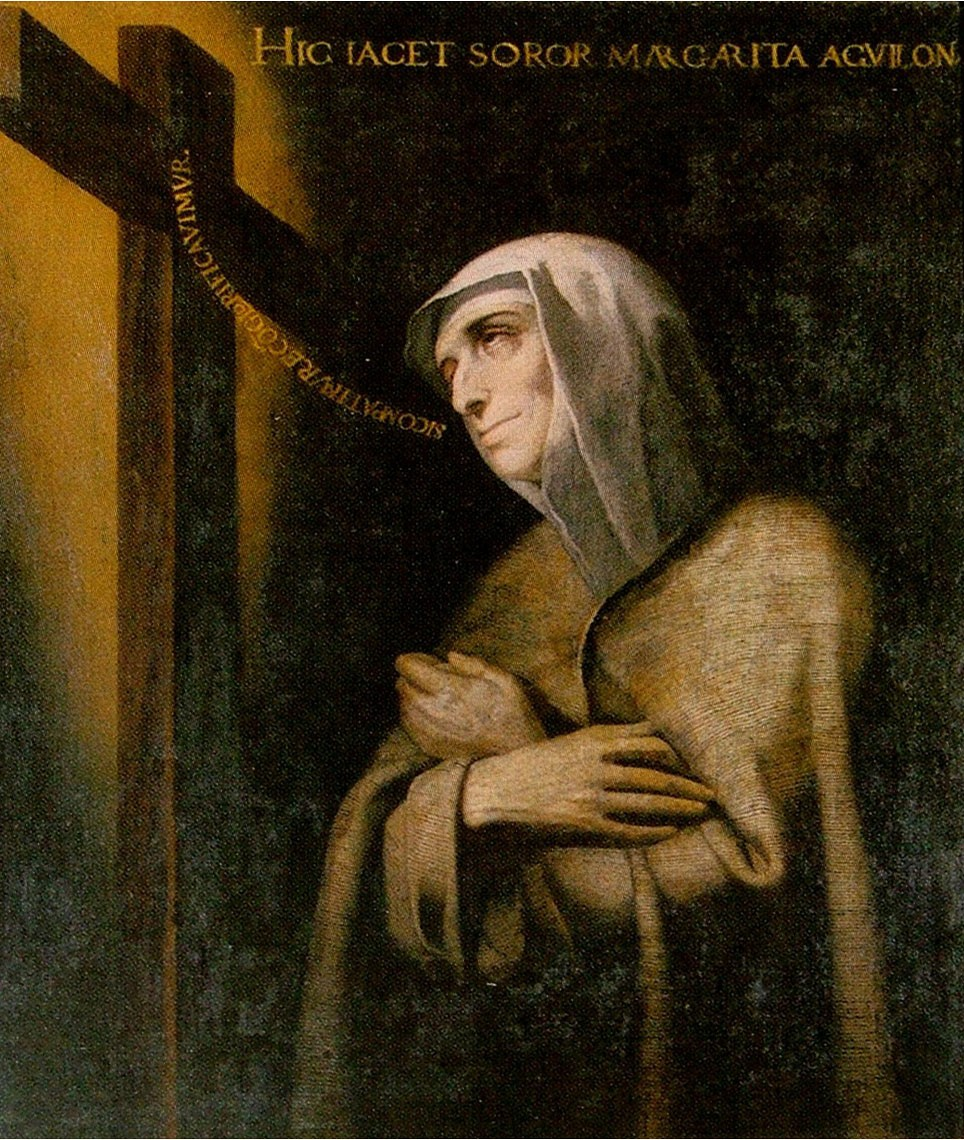
- Portrait, c. 1605
- Born: 1536; Xàtiva, Valencia, Spain
- Died: December 9, 1600 (aged 63–64); Valencia, Spain
- Other names: Margarita Agulló, Sister Agullona, Beata Agullona
- Occupation: Third Order of Franciscan Nuns
- Known for: Religious mystic nun and writer

Margarita Agullona, also called Margarita Agulló or simply Sister Agullona or Beata Agullona (1536 – 9 December 1600) was a Roman Catholic mystic nun and writer who lived in eastern Spain. She joined the Third Order of Franciscan nuns.

== Life ==
As a child, Margarita expressed her desire to serve God. At the age of twenty, after refusing opportunities to marry, she made a perpetual vow of chastity and took the third secular order of St. Francis of Assisi. When her parents died, she moved to Valencia to live in a beguinage, where she practiced penance and prayer, and while doing so was said to be often thrown into "a state of ecstasy." She was a model religious, overcoming temptations and making extraordinary penances. Reportedly, her ecstasies were frequent and her prophecies proved to be true.

She became widely known for her virtue, her dedication to the poor, and her stigmatas (red wound markings that appeared on her hands). This is how Pons Fuster documented it:

Some of Agulló's biographers spoke of the stigmata that accompanied her: it was specified that they were In some cases the spiritual grace of the stigmata. This was the case with Blessed Margarita Agulló, although her biographer took great care to hide them under the euphemism of "a red sign" on her chest or of the simple feeling, which was not palpable reality, of stigmata.

Archbishop Juan de Ribera of Valencia, arranged to house Agullona near the Real College of Corpus Christi (next to the Patriarch Church). There he personally witnessed her mystical raptures and for twenty-five years personally examined her spirit. Ribera asked the scholars Father Louis of Granada, Blessed Nicolás Factor, Saint Louis Bertran, and Rodrigo de Solís to thoroughly investigate and confirm her mystical experiences.

The Franciscan Fr. Jaime Sanchis, who had been Margarita's confessor, was commissioned by Ribera to document the nun's life and to edit some of her writings. The first outcome of that work was titled Brief Relationship of Life, Virtues and Miracles of the humble Servant of Sister Margarita Agulló. It was printed in Valencia in 1607 by Juan Crisóstomo Garriz.

== Death ==
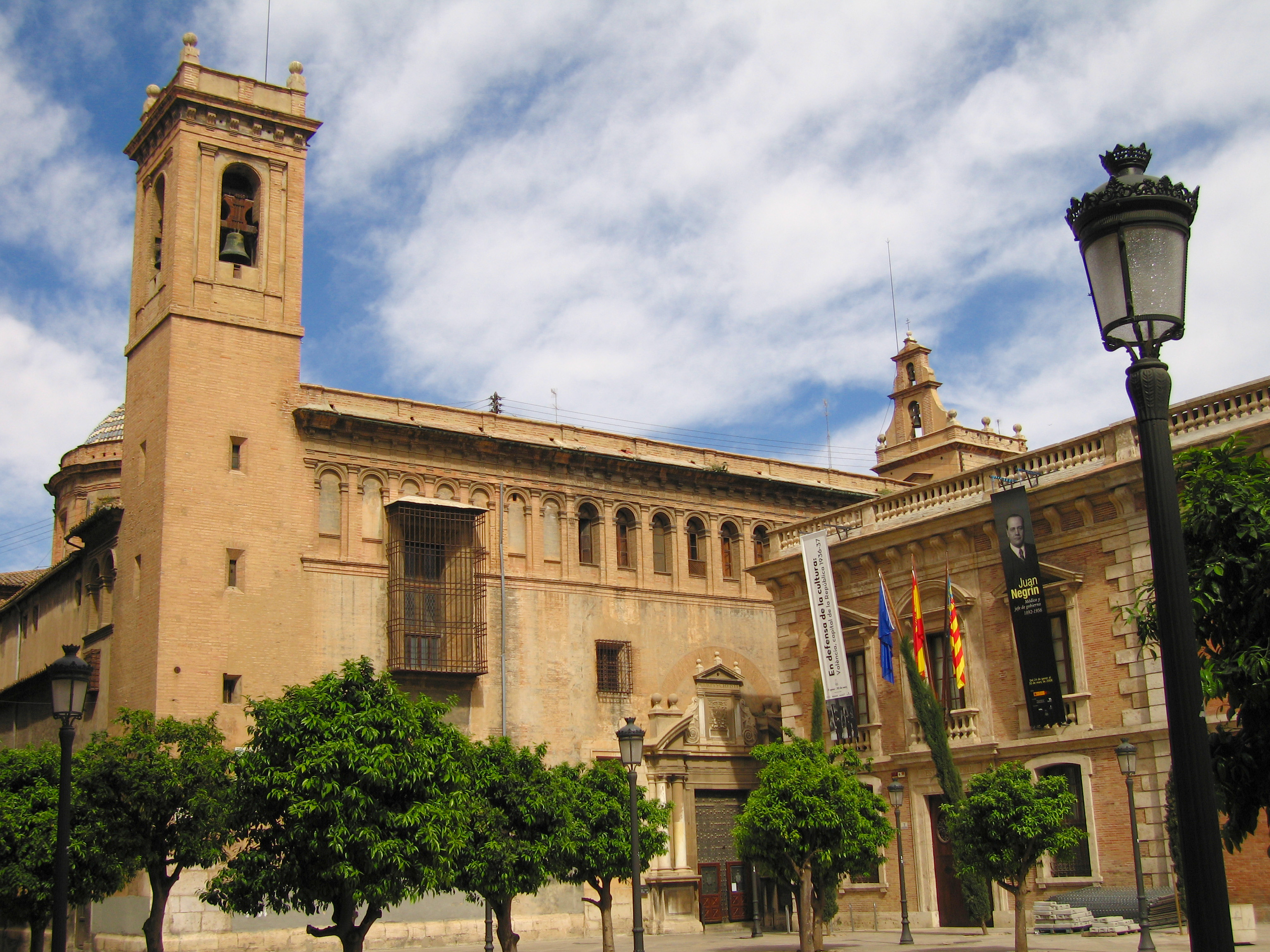
Facade of the Royal Seminary College of Corpus Christi (next to the Patriarch Church) in Valencia, Spain where the remains of Margarita Agullona are interred.

Agullona died in Valencia in 1600 at age 64 in the presence of Juan de Ribera after she had a premonition. He first had her buried in the Capuchin convent in Valencia, and then in 1605 he ordered that her body be transferred to the newly founded the Seminary and Real College of Corpus Christi in Valencia in the "old city." "He ordered in February 1605, that the body of the Venerable, who was incorrupt, be moved, and arranged that a burning lamp always burned before her sepulcher."

Painting of her were done by Francisco Ribalta, who made a great effort to reveal her mystical expression. Agullona paintings by Joan Sarinyena and Francisco Ribalta were preserved in Valencia's Patriarch Museum.

== Works ==
All of Agullona's works were recorded and edited by her confessor Jaime Sanchís and were posthumous collections of her writing.

- Demon Fights, (1604)
- Chants and Praises of God Our Lord, (1605)
- Preparation you made to receive the Sacrament, offer and thank you after received. Valencia, 1607
- Method I kept in contemplating the Passion and Death of Our Lord Jesus Christ, Valencia, 1607
- Copy of some letters or tickets that the Servant of God Sister Margarita Agulló wrote from her own hand to the Most Excellent Lord Don Juan de la Ribera, Patriarch of Antioch and Archbishop of Valencia
