= Society for the Study of Andalusian =

Andalusian cultural organization

The Society for the Study of Andalusian (Spanish: Sociedad para el Estudio del Andaluz; or in Andalusian as written in their website, Zoziedá pal Ehtudio'el Andalú, ZEA) is a cultural association with the headquarters in Mijas (Andalusia, Spain) dedicated to the study of Andalusian dialect.

The association is formed by philologists, historians, anthropologists, etc., that aims to fight against the prejudices against the usage of Andalusian and seek the social and institutional recognition of this dialect. This association uses an unofficial orthography, similar to Basque and organizes literary competitions.

== See also ==
- Andalusian language movement
