= Marinaleda =

- Municipality
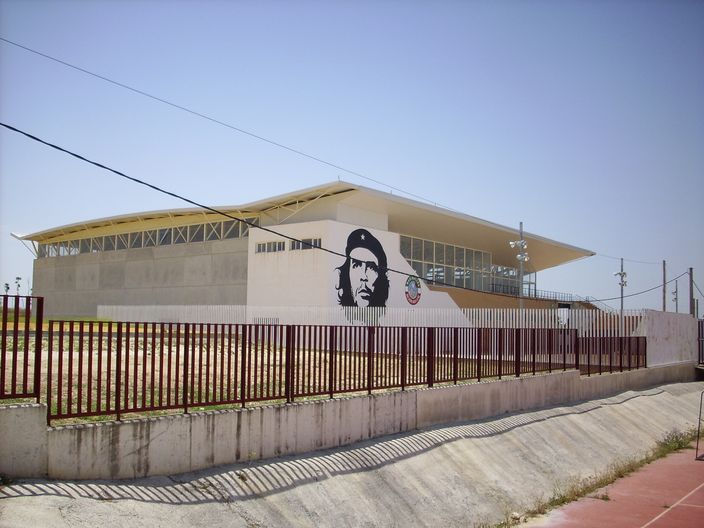
- The multi-purpose building of Marinaleda, adorned with a portrait of Ernesto Che Guevara

- Flag Seal

- Location in Andalusia Marinaleda (Spain)
- Coordinates: 37°22′16″N 4°57′29″W
- Country: Spain
- Community: Andalusia
- Province: Seville
- Comarca: Sierra Sur de Sevilla

Government
  - Mayor: Sergio Gómez Reyes (CUT)

Area
  - Total: 25 km^{2} (9.7 sq mi)
  - Land: 25 km^{2} (9.7 sq mi)
  - Water: 0.00 km^{2} (0 sq mi)
- Elevation: 205 m (673 ft)

Population (2025-01-01)
  - Total: 2,562
  - Density: 100/km^{2} (270/sq mi)
- Demonym: Marinaleño / Marinaleña
- Time zone: UTC+1 (CET)
  - Summer (DST): UTC+2 (CEST)
- Postal code: 41569
- Area code: (+34)...
- Website: marinaleda.es/es

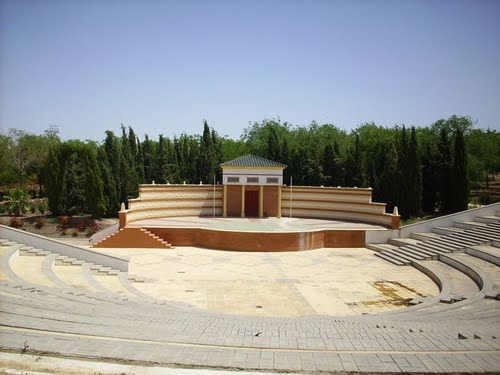
Municipal theatre

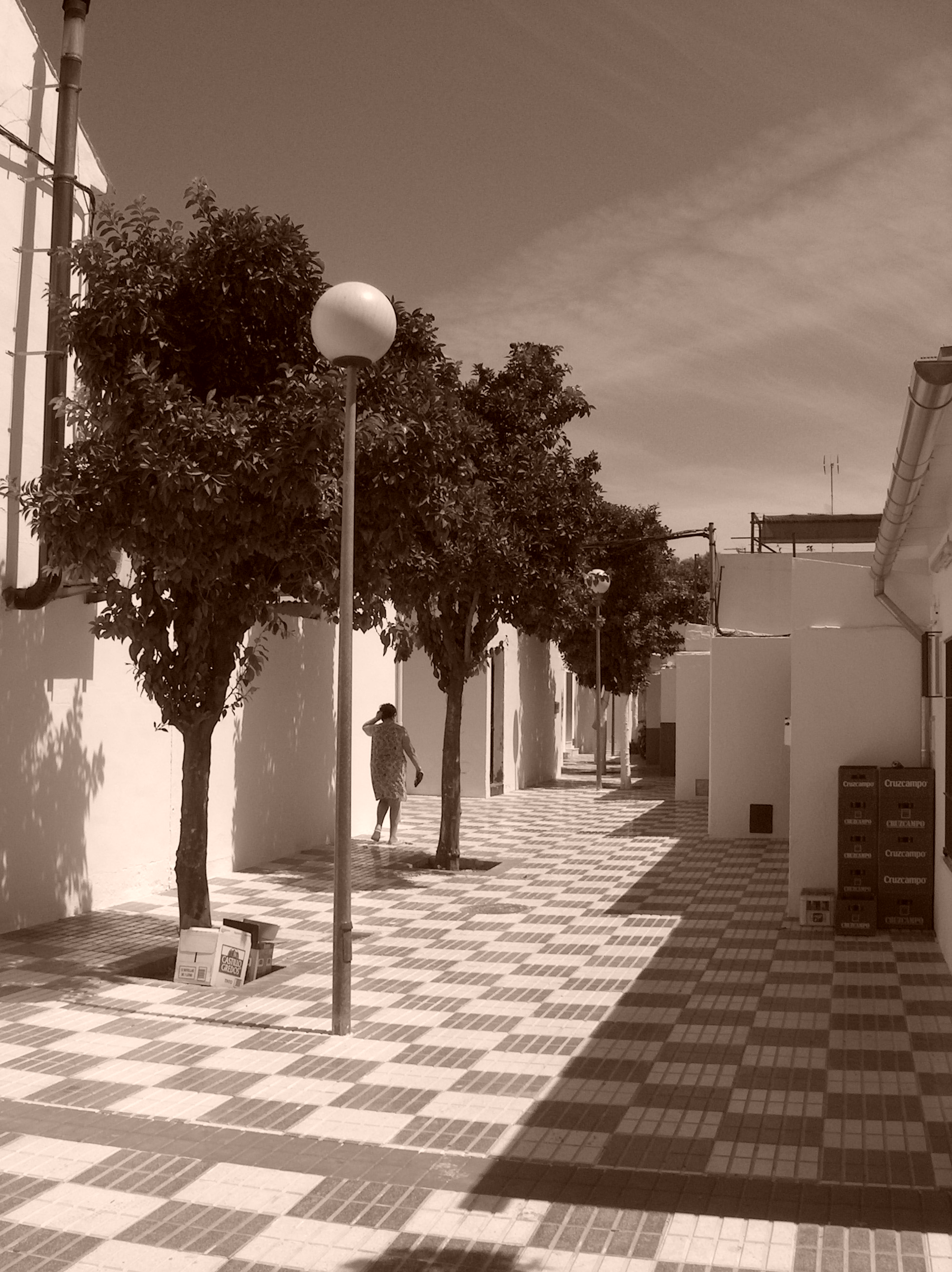
View of a town road

Marinaleda (Spanish pronunciation: [maɾinaˈleða]) is a Spanish municipality of the province of Seville that belongs to the region of Sierra Sur, located in the basin of Genil, in the autonomous community of Andalusia. It has an area of 24.8 km^{2} (9.6 sq mi) and a population of 2,778 inhabitants according to the 2011 census, with a population density of 112.01 inhabitants per square kilometre (290.1/sq mi). It belongs to the judicial district of Estepa.

Marinaleda is a predominantly agricultural municipality and this makes up the bulk of its economy. It is noted for its left-leaning principles based on a leftist ideology led by Juan Manuel Sánchez Gordillo, mayor from 1979 to 2023 and a member of the Unitarian Candidacy of Workers (CUT). Local workers and peasants have achieved a high rate of development and practically full employment for its people. The development of an alternative economic mode has achieved notable results, even during the economic crisis that began in 2008.

Critics claim that this economic and social progress is due in part to the fact that almost 66% of the income received by the City of Marinaleda is from administrative superiors such as the state, the autonomous community, and the Provincial Council of Seville. In reality, Marinaleda receives less than the average remittance received by municipalities in Andalusia (in 2011 it received around 6.61% less than the regional average).

Marinaleda is part of the "Network of Municipalities for the Third Republic" and the tricolor flag is present in civil buildings.

== Geography ==
The town is located at an altitude of 205 metres (673 ft) and lies 108 kilometres (67 mi) east of the provincial capital, Seville. Marinaleda belongs to the comarca of Estepa and is situated between this latter town and Écija, in the eastern part of the province of Seville, in the basin of the Genil river. Its geographical coordinates are 37°22′N 4°57′W.

== History ==
The first indications of human settlement in the territory now covered by the Marinaleda municipality go back to the late Neolithic and Chalcolithic periods, about 5,000 years ago. Stone tools and traces of seeds and dwelling places have been found.

There was a major Roman presence, and some date the foundation of the village to this period. The Roman road connecting the villages of Astigi (present-day Écija) and Ostippo (Estepa) ran by Marinaleda, and there have been many discoveries from the period.

The Arab presence is visible in monuments such as the Towers of Gallape and the fortress of Alhonoz. The region was conquered by the Christian monarchs in the 13th century, and Marinaleda came under the rule of the religious Order of Santiago. Philip II granted the village to the first Marquess of Estepa, and it would remain under this ownership until manors were dissolved in the 19th century.

Marinaleda then grew as a population centre due to the influx of day labourers working for large landowners, especially the Marquesses of Estepa. There is evidence that, in 1751, there were 60 houses lived in by landless labourers, who earned two reals for a full day's work.

In the 18th century, Marinaleda had three clergymen and a shop belonging to the Marquess of Peñaflor, who lived in Écija. The main economic activity was rain-fed agriculture.

During the 19th century in Marinaleda and neighbouring territories, there were several groups of bandits involving residents of the municipality. Notable groups include those commanded by José María Hinojosa Cobacho, "El Tempranillo", Francisco Ríos González "El Pernales", and Juan Caballero.

In 1931, the population of Marinaleda was 2,318, of whom only 317 were entitled to vote. The elections of 12 April that year were won by monarchist supporters, whereas those of 31 May were won by republicans. The final elections of the Republican period, on 16 February 1936, were won by the Popular Front.

At the start of the Civil War, troops supporting the coup assassinated the mayor, Vicente Cejas Moreno, his son, and at least 30 other residents. In the postwar period, the population suffered great poverty, hunger, and repression. The poor survived by gleaning olives and acorns from the fields of the estates.

The industrialization of Spain beginning in the 1960s encouraged emigration from Marinaleda to industrial areas, especially Catalonia, as well as to other countries such as Germany, France, and Switzerland.

Upon the death of Francisco Franco in 1975, the dictatorship he had established in Spain gave way to a representative democracy. In 1977, the Sindicato de Obreros del Campo (Union of Farm Workers) was founded in Marinaleda. The following year, a struggle for land began with a two-day occupation of the Bocatinaja estate, between Osuna and Los Corrales.

The first post-Franco municipal elections were held in 1979. The Colectivo de Unidad de los Trabajadores (Workers' Unity Collective) won in Marinaleda, gaining 9 of the 11 council seats. The new council replaced street names associated with the victors of the Civil War by names of left-wing heroes. For example, Muñoz Grandes street became Che Guevara street, the Plaza of Spain became the People's Plaza, and the Plaza of Francisco Franco was renamed after Salvador Allende.

In 1980, 700 people staged a 13-day hunger strike, demanding better pay and stricter regulation of the old system of employment. The success of this action led to intensification of the land struggle, with further occupations of large landowners' estates under the slogan "Land to those who work on it". In 1984, the Cordobilla marsh was occupied for 30 days to demand irrigation for a farm called El Humoso, property of the Duke of Infantado, facilitating its later expropriation.

In 1985, the occupation of estates increased in number by at least 100, as well as in length, extending to over 90 days. This led to many legal actions.

In 1991, a 1,200-hectare (3,000-acre) tract of El Humoso farm was handed over to Marinaleda for the use of the population. Demonstrations demanding a life of dignity increased between 1992 and 1994, with many occupations of government buildings and institutions.

In 1997, irrigation was extended to the whole of the El Humoso, and the Marinaleda S.C.A. A cooperative was founded to cultivate the farm collectively. Three years later, a food processing plant was set up, supplied by the raw materials of the cooperative: piquillo pepper, beans, artichokes, and olives. An oil press was also built. Production continued to increase, and employment along with it.

During the euro area crisis, while 30% of the active population in Andalusia was without work, Marinaleda had full employment.

The social and political system that has been implemented in the community, and the good results obtained in terms of economic development and well-being of the inhabitants, has brought Marinaleda to the attention of the media in Spain and abroad.

The "Social Democracy" tab on the town's website states the following:

And while we were struggling for land, for industry, for employment, we realised that there were other basic rights that had to be won. And the first necessity we identified was the lack of places to live, but we also realised that there was no place for our elders after so many years of hardship and troubles, nor was there a medical clinic, nor a day nursery, nor sports facilities, and the streets were unpaved and almost unlit.

By Social Democracy we mean unlimited access to all forms of well-being for the whole population of our village. We have always thought that liberty without equality is nothing, and that democracy without real well-being for real people is an empty word and a way to deceive people into believing they are part of a project when in fact they are not needed at all.

It seemed to us that in this principle there should be no limits; that the people should have a dream of collective welfare and that it should be realized by struggle, because no popular aspirations, no matter how unreachable they may seem, can be rejected either in thought or in action by a genuinely revolutionary Left.

In this way, we were able to win each and all of the things that we were clearly lacking.

In 2023, Juan Manuel Sánchez Gordillo, mayor of Marinaleda since 1979, retired due to ill health. His successor is Sergio Gómez Reyes.

== Demographics ==
Historical population

Year	Pop.	±%
1842	796	—
1857	1,398	+75.6%
1860	1,313	−6.1%
1877	1,384	+5.4%
1887	1,702	+23.0%
1897	1,785	+4.9%
1900	1,753	−1.8%
1910	1,864	+6.3%
1920	2,318	+24.4%
1930	2,563	+10.6%

Year	Pop.	±%
1940	3,070	+19.8%
1950	3,387	+10.3%
1960	2,879	−15.0%
1970	2,439	−15.3%
1981	2,317	−5.0%
1991	2,518	+8.7%
2001	2,650	+5.2%
2011	2,783	+5.0%
2021	2,627	−5.6%

Source: National Statistics Institute

== Local government ==
For over 40 years, the mayor of Marinaleda has been Juan Manuel Sánchez Gordillo of the United Left Party. Gordillo has anointed Marinaleda a "utopia for peace", which has no municipal police (saving $350,000 a year). Additionally, political murals and revolutionary slogans adorn the town's whitewashed walls and streets are named after Latin American leftists. Every few weeks, the town hall declares a Red Sunday over a bullhorn and volunteers clean the streets or do odd jobs.

They all thought that the market was God, who made everything work with his invisible hand. Before, it was a mortal sin to talk about the government having a role in the economy. Now, we see we have to put the economy at the service of man.

— Mayor Juan Manuel Sánchez Gordillo, May 2009 remarks about Spain's real estate bust and rampant unemployment.

Marinaleda has a long tradition of sociopolitical struggle by agricultural labourers, which has decisively influenced the attainment of diverse political and social advances. Marinaleda was ruled by CUT-BAI (Collective for the Unity of Workers - Andalusian Left Bloc) from 1979 until 1986, when CUT-BAI joined United Left (IU), which has since been the ruling party, although most of the members of IU's local branch are basically members of CUT-BAI.

== Local economy ==
The town operates a farming cooperative with 2,650 workers. Marinaleda is surrounded by sloping olive groves and features a 3,000-acre (12 km^{2}) farm. The farm is located seven miles (11 km) north of Marinaleda, and grows labour-intensive crops like artichokes, hot peppers, broccoli, and broad beans, as well as wheat.

== Town planning ==
Marinaleda represents a local exception of the national housing crisis caused by real estate speculation. The municipality was the subject of national news when it became known that one could own a house in this town for no more than 15 euros per month through the self-building program.

=== Self-building ===
The Ayuntamiento (local government) of Marinaleda bought and expropriated thousands of square metres of land, now communal property, for the construction of new houses. Land, building materials, and architectural plans are provided to the self-builder through public grants. Free assistance from professional builders is also provided. The hours spent by the resident on construction (if any) are deducted from the total cost. Prospective owners usually donate about 450 days of their work to the construction. Finally, a monthly payment of up to 15.52 euros is arranged with the contractors and the government for the resident to achieve ownership. To prevent speculation, citizens are prohibited from selling their homes.

=== Layout ===
Marinaleda's citizens reside in a colony of neat houses, each with three bedrooms, one bathroom, and a garden of 100 m^{2} (1,100 sq ft), allowing for future expansions. In recent years 350 single-family homes have been built according to this scheme, even though the town has fewer than 3,000 inhabitants.

== See also ==
- Eurozone crisis
- List of municipalities in Seville
