= Bayoumi Andil =

Egyptian linguist and writer (1942-2009)

- بيومي قنديل
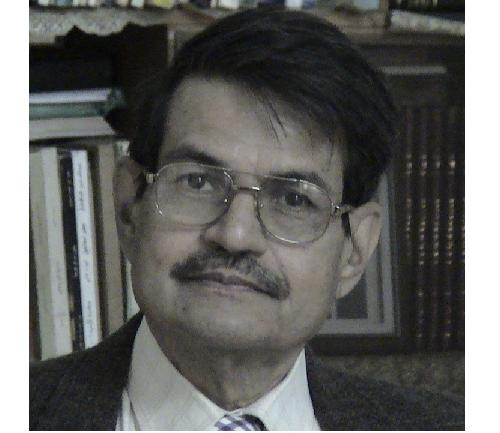
- Born: July 31, 1942; Egypt
- Died: October 8, 2009 (aged 67); Egypt
- Occupations: Linguist, writer
- Writing career
- Language: Masri; Arabic
- Period: 20th/21st century
- Notable work: The Present State of Culture in Egypt

Bayoumi Andil (Arabic: بيومي قنديل) (31 July 1942 – 8 October 2009) was an Egyptian linguist and writer who authored many books on Egyptian culture and Modern Egyptian language.

Andil asserted that the language spoken in modern Egypt is not a dialect of Arabic, but rather a linguistic evolution of the Coptic language and the ancient Egyptian language. His most well-known book, The Present State of Culture in Egypt, posits that Egyptians have resisted attempts to change their national identity, language and national religion. Although the country embraced Christianity in the 1st century AD and Islam after the Arab conquest of Egypt in 641 AD, Andil states that Egyptians Egyptianized both Christianity and Islam. He argues that the "true" Egyptian spirit survived only in the oral culture of illiterate Egyptians, specially rural Egyptians, whose illiteracy protected their national identity from disappearing. He was also an Egyptian nationalist. He stated that traditional Egyptian culture is pluralistic and respectful of women. He espoused secularism and scientific thought, and called linguistics a "noble" field of study.

== Life ==
Bayoumi Andil was a rural Egyptian from a village in Monoufia, Egypt. He lived the first thirty years of his life in rural Egypt, which informed his view of the linguistics and language of the country. He later moved to Cairo. Bayoumi Andil was known for his sharp, uncompromising character; a friend of his, an Egyptian writer, remarked that such personality trait was due to Andil's rural Egyptian nature.

== Egyptian language ==
Andil wrote many articles and books about modern Egyptian linguistics and the history of language in the country. He proposed that the language spoken in modern Egypt is not a dialect of Arabic but rather the fourth stage of Egyptians' historic language and should not truly be considered a variety of Arabic: The grammatical, morphological and phonological differences between today's spoken Egyptian and the Arabic language is sufficiently disparate to categorize them into two distinct groups, whereas the similarities between the first category and earlier Egyptian languages, most notably Coptic and ancient Egyptian, are strong enough to consider modern Masri (today's Egyptian language) an evolution of ancient Egyptian. Bayoumi Andil also called on the Egyptians to revive ancient Egyptian, particularly in its Coptic stage, and to study the ancient Egyptian language in all of its stages.

Beginning in the 1980s, Andil's work focused on promoting the revival of secular Egyptian nationalism, on language and linguistics in Egypt, and on the revival of ancient Egyptian culture. Despite his admiration for Taha Hussein, an intellectual of the Egyptian enlightenment movement in the first half of the 20th century, Andil criticized Hussein's publication, Mustaqbal al-Thaqafa fi Misr or (The Future of Culture in Egypt). He argued the work did not adequately define Egyptian culture.

== Celebration of plurality ==
Andil argued that the culture of a nation is the sum total of the value systems created by its people over the entire course of the nation's history. He believed that Egyptian culture is the outcome of an agriculture-based civilisation and that Egyptian forefathers were the first to establish the solar calendar, the bases of medicine and geometry. In his books delineating the achievements of the Egyptians, Andil quoted James H. Breasted to support his hypothesis that the ancient Egyptians were the first to create a system of writing, in addition to referring to the arguments of linguistics scholar Simon Potter over the leading role of the Egyptian alphabet.

Andil focused on plurality as an important dimension of Egyptian culture. Egyptian myths were polytheistic and referred to a host of gods, which promoted the values of tolerance among Egyptians. Followers of different gods used to hold festivals to celebrate them. These festivals were universal; the followers of Osiris celebrated Ra and the other way around while followers of Amon sanctified Isis. Today, Cairenes celebrate Mulid al-Sayed al-Badawi of Tanta, while Alexandrians celebrate Mulid Abul-Haggag of Luxor. By the same token, Muslim Egyptians celebrate the Coptic Christian Mulids such as those held to commemorate the Holy Virgin or St Barsoum al-Erian, and the other way around. Such manifestations of plurality promote the value of recognising and accepting the other. There was no room for such value under Akhnaton, who, by calling for the exclusive worship of one god (Aton), became the founder of what would later become the monotheistic culture of religious intolerance and prosecution of heresy, a culture that is prevailing strongly among the followers of the Abrahamic religions. Yet Akhnaton is commonly revered as the father of monotheism.

== A gentle people ==
Among the cultural norms stressed in Andil's writing was the respect of women. Unlike the region's other peoples, Egyptians were distinguished by the appreciation of women. The attributes that the Egyptians gave to Sayeda Zeinab, the granddaughter of the Prophet Mohamed, had their source in the attributes of Isis. The same could be said about her brother al-Hussein, the attributes that the Egyptians gave to him had much in common with the attributes of Osiris. Although Egyptian culture changed in many ways over the ages, certain features survived. The first is tolerance, a characteristic of agriculture-based societies, and the second is plurality which led Herodotus to describe ancient Egyptians as the most pious people. Centuries later, Sigmund Freud conceived of Egyptians as a gentle people, while he considered Semites wild and savage. Plurality in turn led to the promotion of equality between men and women. Yet there was a setback in terms of the status of women with the advent of the Abrahamic religions that were introduced to Egypt under the Romans and later under the Arabs and the other invading rulers. Andil has a telling story to confirm his view of the inherent gentleness of Egyptians. He heard the story from a Palestinian friend who was living in Gaza during the Israeli invasion in 1956. When Jewish soldiers of Egyptian origin inspected her home, they caused no harm to the family, on the contrary quelling the family's fears. One of the soldiers gently told her grandmother: "Don't be afraid, mother, and don't bother to get up. Stay where you are." Iraqi Jewish soldiers, by contrast, stormed her neighbours' house and wreaked havoc in their home and committed horrible crimes.

== Out of the dark tunnel ==
Egyptian culture affected Quran tajweed (the way of chanting Quranic verses). Sheikh Mohammed Refaat used the oriental Nahawand scale in the tajweed while Sheikh Mustafa Ismail used the Bayaty scale. Andil was a staunch defender of illiterate Egyptians for the role they played in preserving and transmitting Egyptian culture from one generation to the next. Educated people connived with the Anglo-Americans to Arabise Egypt. Reactionary ideas and values were accordingly promoted and this climate bred many terrorists who antagonise those who believe in other religions. Andil concluded that the only way out of this dark tunnel is to revive secular Egyptian nationalism. Andil remarked on how several nations managed, thanks to their intellectuals, to preserve the national identity of their homeland. Iranians, for instance, accepted Islam, but never accepted Arabism. They are proud of their pre-Islamic heroes, myths and gods. The same could be said about Finnish people who liberated themselves from the Swedish culture thanks to their intellectuals who spared no effort to revive the national heritage of the country. Indians preserved their culture in the face of the Mongols, while the great Spanish people under Queen Isabella liberated their country from the Arab invaders. In contrast, Andil maintained that the "educated Egyptians" (as he defines them) have an inferiority complex, which prevails in their attitude toward true Egyptian culture; whereas illiterate Egyptians, specially rural Egyptians, preserved the true Egyptian spirit in their oral culture and traditional cultural practices.

== See also ==
- Ahmed Lutfi el-Sayed
- Liberal Egyptian Party
