= Standard for Andalusian =

Proposed standard orthography for Andalusian Spanish

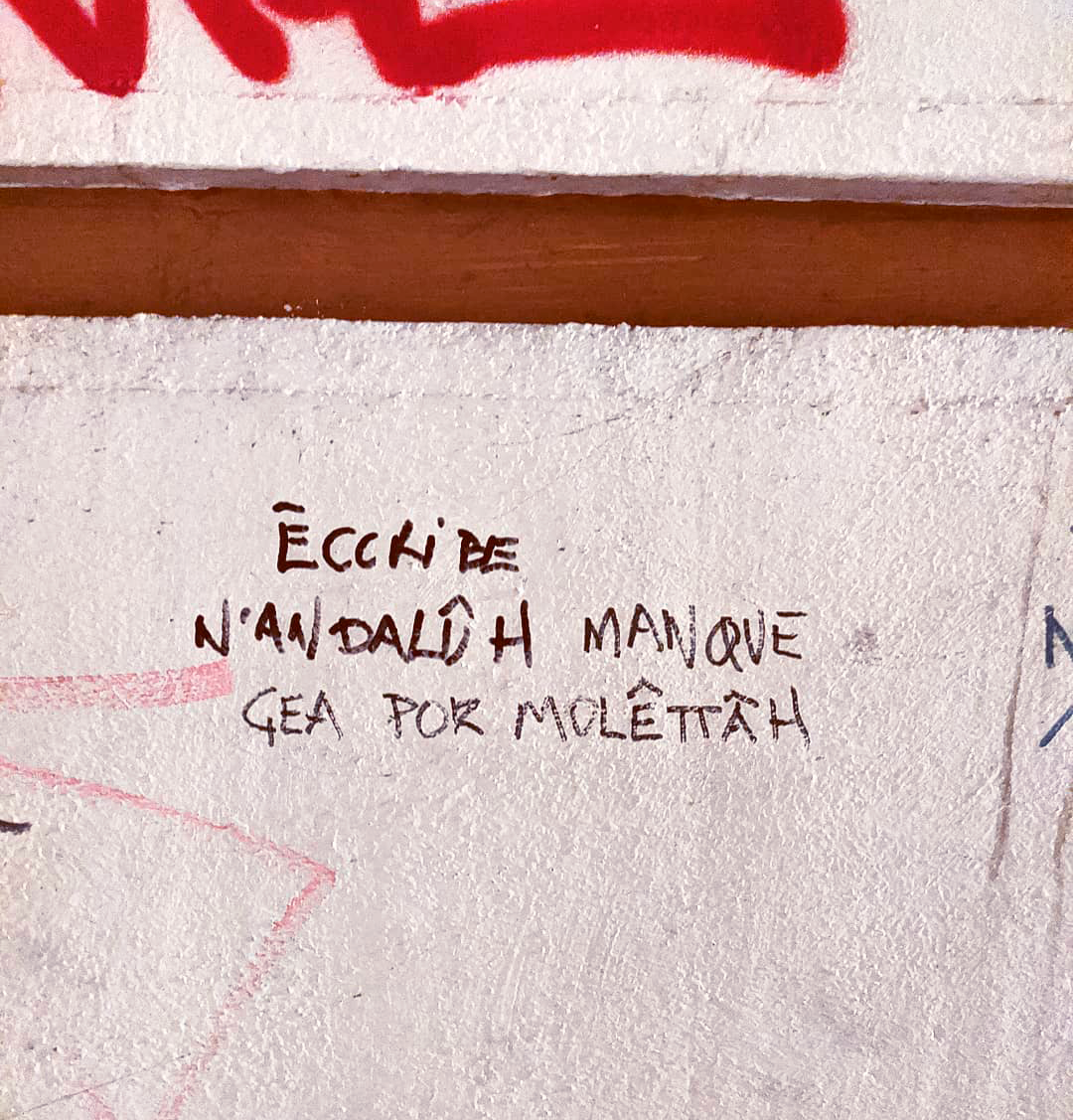
Graffiti in Seville with text in EPA Andalusian. The text says Êccribe n'andalûh manque çea por molêttâh, "Write in Andalusian even if it is only to bother".

Êttandâ pal andalûh ("Standard for Andalusian", EPA; Estándar para el andaluz in standard Spanish) is a proposed standardized orthographic system for Andalusian Spanish. It is one of several orthographies proposed as part of the Andalusian language movement.

== Characteristics ==
EPA differs from standard Spanish orthography in reflecting the phonetics of the Andalusian dialect. Notable differences include:

- [s] is represented with <ç> before [e] and [i]
- [β] is always represented as <b>, even where standard Spanish orthography uses a <v>
- [t͡ʃ] is represented with <x> (as in Catalan)
- Geminated consonants, which occur in Andalusian Spanish following a syllable ending in a dropped [s], are represented with a doubled consonant
- Vowels immediately preceding a dropped [s] are marked with a circumflex, and an <h> is added at the end of the word
- All instances of <h> that are not pronounced in standard Spanish are removed

== Example ==
Article 1 of the Universal Declaration of Human Rights in EPA, standard Spanish, and English:

Standard for Andalusian	Standard Spanish	English
Tôh lô çerê umanô naçen librê e igualê en dînnidá y derexô y, dotaô como êttán de raçón y conçiençia, deben comportarçe fratênnarmente lô unô con lô otrô.	Todos los seres humanos nacen libres e iguales en dignidad y derechos y, dotados como están de razón y conciencia, deben comportarse fraternalmente los unos con los otros.	All human beings are born free and equal in dignity and rights. They are endowed with reason and conscience and should act towards one another in a spirit of brotherhood.
