= La Nau =

Cultural property in Valencia, Spain

Coordinates: 39°28′19″N 0°22′22″W

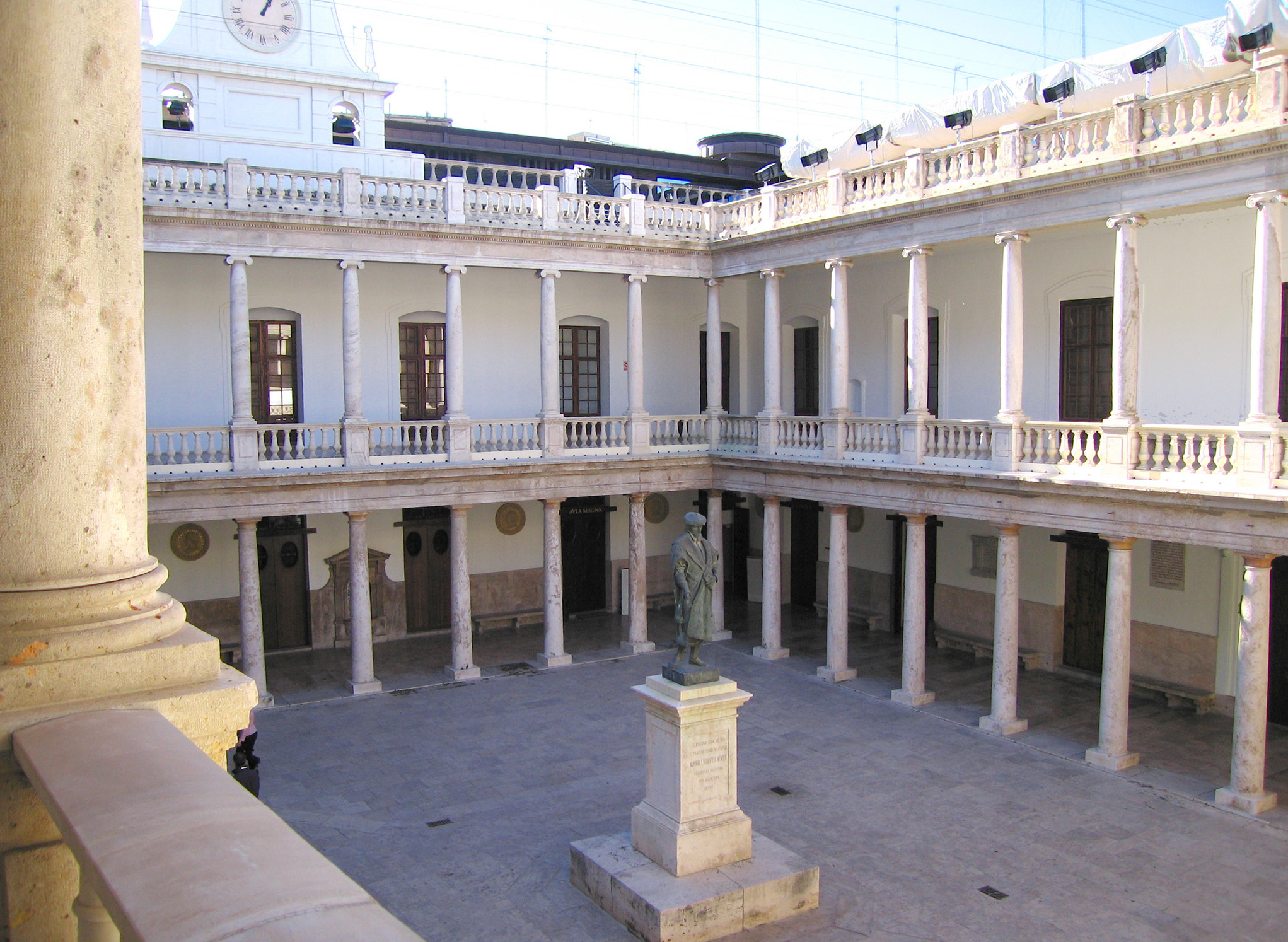
La Nau, the old university - Universitat valència vella

La Nau (literally "The Nave") is the former building of the old Universidad Literaria in Valencia, and is today one of the smaller buildings of the modern Universitat de València. The street itself is known as the carrer de la Nau after the building. It was built in 1497 and remodeled in 1830. The courtyard is now used for a café and exhibitions.
