= Royal Academy of Valencian Culture =

- Real Acadèmia de Cultura Valenciana
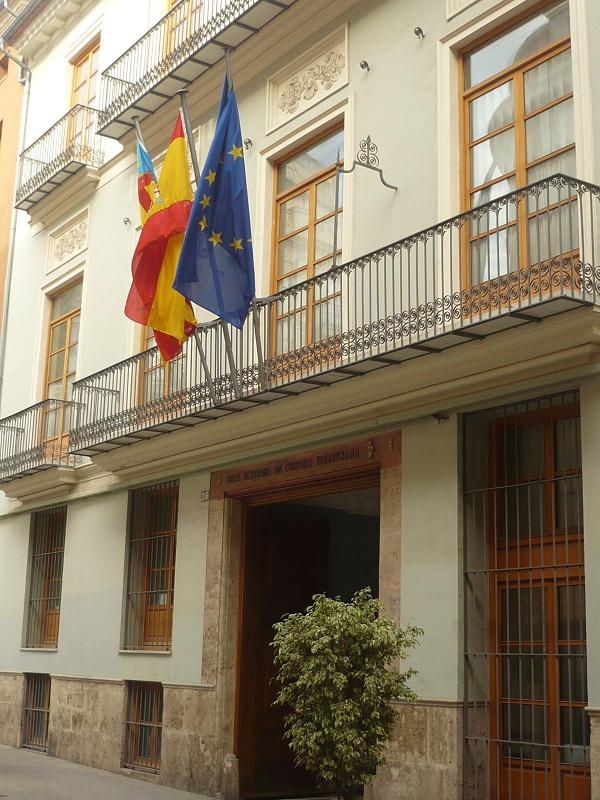
- Headquarters of the RACV
- Abbreviation: RACV
- Formation: 1915; 111 years ago
- Founder: Diputación Provincial de Valencia
- Purpose: Linguistic and cultural research
- Headquarters: Valencia, Spain
- Region served: Valencian Community
- Official language: Valencian
- Main organ: Governing board
- Website: www.racv.es

The Royal Academy of Valencian Culture (RACV) (in Valencian: Real Acadèmia de Cultura Valenciana) is a public law corporation, combining features of a public and private entity, founded in 1915 to research and study the Valencian language and culture.

== Activities ==
Its research areas include Valencian history, culture, folklore, and most notably linguistics. According to its statute, its objective is the research, knowledge, encouragement, and promotion of the culture from the old Kingdom of Valencia (today Valencian Community), as well as the defence of the values and identity features of the Valencian people. It was first called Centre of Valencian Culture until 1978 when it was named Academia de Cultura Valenciana. In 1991 the Spanish king Juan Carlos I gave it the title of Royal Academy (Real Academia) adding it to its name. At the same time, the Academy joined the Institute of Spain. Its headquarters are located in the Avellanas street in the historical centre of Valencia, close to its partner cultural association Lo Rat Penat.

In linguistics, the RACV defends Valencian as a singular language. The Academy considers Catalan as a different language from Valencian, but places both languages inside of the Occitano-Romance languages family. In addition, the section of Valencian language and literature of the Royal Academy of Valencian Culture elaborates and promotes an alternative form of standardisation for Valencian called Norms of El Puig which attempts to reflect the Valencian linguistic reality from an autochthonous perspective, supporting exclusively genuine Valencian linguistic forms. In this respect, the RACV disagrees with the official Valencian Academy of the Language (AVL) which prefers the unitarian linguistic thesis.

The Royal Academy of Valencian Culture has had several moments of collaboration with the local, provincial, and regional governments, which have usually collaborated with its finance. For example, its linguistic rules, the Norms of El Puig, were the official Valencian standard in the early 1980s. The Academy has been given some awards and distinctions, and it has the support of notable cultural and political personalities, along with the patronage of the Spanish Monarchy. In 2015, the Royal Academy gained public promotion and recognition as a consultative entity for the Valencian Government. Besides, its linguistic rules were given public teaching recognition, although it removed the following year.

== See also ==
- Norms of El Puig
- Lo Rat Penat
