= Andalusian Workers' Union =

Spanish trade union

The Andalusian Workers' Union (Spanish: Sindicato Andaluz de Trabajadores, SAT) is a trade union in the autonomous community of Andalusia, Spain. The SAT was established in 2007 and it is supported by 20,000 affiliates. The SAT's ideological basis are anti-capitalism, internationalism and Andalusian nationalism. It is led by Diego Cañamero.

The Andalusian Workers' Union is known by its "Robin Hood" style protest actions. In August 2013, SAT activists raided a Carrefour supermarket in Seville and took ten shopping carts filled with school materials like pencils, erasers and notebooks which will be distributed to "families in need".

On 9 May 2017, the Andalusian Workers' Union presented Er Prinzipito, a translation of The Little Prince in a supposed Andalusian language by Juan Porras.
