= 1983 Spanish local elections in the Valencian Community =

This article presents the results breakdown of the local elections held in the Valencian Community on 8 May 1983. The following tables show detailed results in the autonomous community's most populous municipalities, sorted alphabetically

== City control ==
The following table lists party control in the most populous municipalities, including provincial capitals (highlighted in bold). Gains for a party are highlighted in that party's colour.

Municipality	Population	Previous control	New control
Alcoy	66,396	Spanish Socialist Workers' Party (PSOE)	Spanish Socialist Workers' Party (PSOE)
**Alicante**	245,963	Spanish Socialist Workers' Party (PSOE)	Spanish Socialist Workers' Party (PSOE)
Benidorm	24,983	Union of the Democratic Centre (UCD)	Spanish Socialist Workers' Party (PSOE)
**Castellón de la Plana**	124,487	Spanish Socialist Workers' Party (PSOE)	Spanish Socialist Workers' Party (PSOE)
Elche	164,779	Spanish Socialist Workers' Party (PSOE)	Spanish Socialist Workers' Party (PSOE)
Elda	53,128	Spanish Socialist Workers' Party (PSOE)	Spanish Socialist Workers' Party (PSOE)
Gandia	48,558	Union of the Democratic Centre (UCD)	Spanish Socialist Workers' Party (PSOE)
Orihuela	50,084	Union of the Democratic Centre (UCD)	Spanish Socialist Workers' Party (PSOE) (AP in 1986)
Paterna	33,237	Spanish Socialist Workers' Party (PSOE)	Spanish Socialist Workers' Party (PSOE)
Sagunto	55,294	Spanish Socialist Workers' Party (PSOE)	Spanish Socialist Workers' Party (PSOE)
Torrent	51,762	Spanish Socialist Workers' Party (PSOE)	Spanish Socialist Workers' Party (PSOE)
Torrevieja	12,321	Spanish Socialist Workers' Party (PSOE)	Spanish Socialist Workers' Party (PSOE)
**Valencia**	744,748	Spanish Socialist Workers' Party (PSOE)	Spanish Socialist Workers' Party (PSOE)

== Municipalities ==
=== Alcoy ===
Population: 66,396

← Summary of the 8 May 1983 City Council of Alcoy election results →
Parties and alliances	Popular vote			Seats	
Parties and alliances	Votes	%	±pp	Total	+/−
Spanish Socialist Workers' Party (PSOE)	23,130	66.23	+24.06	18	+7
People's Coalition–Valencian Union (AP–PDP–UL–UV)^{1}	8,176	23.41	+20.15	6	+6
Communist Party of the Valencian Country (PCE–PCPV)	2,210	6.33	−10.25	1	−3
CIM (CIM)	700	2.00	New	0	±0
Democratic and Social Centre (CDS)	375	1.07	New	0	±0
Communist Candidacy (CC)	335	0.96	New	0	±0
Union of the Democratic Centre (UCD)	n/a	n/a	−35.49	0	−10
Blank ballots	0	0.00	−0.17		
Total	34,926			25	±0
Valid votes	34,926	100.00	+0.46		
Invalid votes	0	0.00	−0.46		
Votes cast / turnout	34,926	67.87	−2.44		
Abstentions	16,534	32.13	+2.44		
Registered voters	51,460				
Sources
Footnotes: ^{1} People's Coalition–Valencian Union results are compared to Democratic Coalition totals in the 1979 election.

=== Alicante ===
Population: 245,963

← Summary of the 8 May 1983 City Council of Alicante election results →
Parties and alliances	Popular vote			Seats	
Parties and alliances	Votes	%	±pp	Total	+/−
Spanish Socialist Workers' Party (PSOE)	70,453	61.68	+18.35	19	+6
People's Coalition–Valencian Union (AP–PDP–UL–UV)^{1}	32,193	28.19	+25.23	8	+8
Communist Party of the Valencian Country (PCE–PCPV)	5,649	4.95	−8.65	0	−4
Democratic and Social Centre (CDS)	2,439	2.14	New	0	±0
Liberal Democratic Party (PDL)	2,100	1.84	New	0	±0
Workers' Socialist Party (PST)	1,042	0.91	New	0	±0
Spanish Democratic Republican Action (ARDE)	341	0.30	−0.15	0	±0
Union of the Democratic Centre (UCD)	n/a	n/a	−31.37	0	−10
Blank ballots	0	0.00	±0.00		
Total	114,217			27	±0
Valid votes	114,217	100.00	+0.84		
Invalid votes	0	0.00	−0.84		
Votes cast / turnout	114,217	65.38	+7.62		
Abstentions	60,480	34.62	−7.62		
Registered voters	174,697				
Sources
Footnotes: ^{1} People's Coalition–Valencian Union results are compared to Democratic Coalition totals in the 1979 election.

=== Benidorm ===
Population: 24,983

← Summary of the 8 May 1983 City Council of Benidorm election results →
Parties and alliances	Popular vote			Seats	
Parties and alliances	Votes	%	±pp	Total	+/−
Spanish Socialist Workers' Party (PSOE)	5,941	48.75	+17.38	12	+5
People's Coalition–Valencian Union (AP–PDP–UL–UV)^{1}	3,153	25.87	+19.97	6	+5
Valencian People's Union (UPV)^{2}	941	7.72	+0.84	2	+1
Benidorm Independent Group (AIB)	908	7.45	−4.83	1	−2
Communist Party of the Valencian Country (PCE–PCPV)	537	4.41	−5.32	0	−2
Liberal Democratic Party (PDL)	401	3.29	New	0	±0
Democratic and Social Centre (CDS)	271	2.22	New	0	±0
Spanish Democratic Republican Action (ARDE)	34	0.28	−2.21	0	±0
Union of the Democratic Centre (UCD)	n/a	n/a	−31.36	0	−7
Blank ballots	0	0.00	±0.00		
Total	12,186			21	±0
Valid votes	12,186	100.00	+1.30		
Invalid votes	0	0.00	−1.30		
Votes cast / turnout	12,186	60.90	+6.37		
Abstentions	7,825	39.10	−6.37		
Registered voters	20,011				
Sources
Footnotes: ^{1} People's Coalition–Valencian Union results are compared to Democratic Coalition totals in the 1979 election.; ^{2} Valencian People's Union results are compared to Nationalist Party of the Valencian Country totals in the 1979 election.

=== Castellón de la Plana ===
Population: 124,487

← Summary of the 8 May 1983 City Council of Castellón de la Plana election results →
Parties and alliances	Popular vote			Seats	
Parties and alliances	Votes	%	±pp	Total	+/−
Spanish Socialist Workers' Party (PSOE)	38,559	63.52	+22.72	19	+7
People's Coalition–Valencian Union (AP–PDP–UL–UV)^{1}	16,930	27.89	+22.82	8	+7
Valencian People's Union (UPV)^{2}	2,213	3.65	−4.12	0	−2
Communist Party of the Valencian Country (PCE–PCPV)	1,157	1.91	−5.34	0	−2
Liberal Democratic Party (PDL)	934	1.54	New	0	±0
Democratic and Social Centre (CDS)	909	1.50	New	0	±0
Union of the Democratic Centre (UCD)	n/a	n/a	−36.66	0	−10
Blank ballots	0	0.00	±0.00		
Total	60,702			27	±0
Valid votes	60,702	100.00	+1.27		
Invalid votes	0	0.00	−1.27		
Votes cast / turnout	60,702	67.99	+1.49		
Abstentions	28,577	32.01	−1.49		
Registered voters	89,279				
Sources
Footnotes: ^{1} People's Coalition–Valencian Union results are compared to Democratic Coalition totals in the 1979 election.; ^{2} Valencian People's Union results are compared to Independent Left of Castellón totals in the 1979 election.

=== Elche ===
Population: 164,779

← Summary of the 8 May 1983 City Council of Elche election results →
Parties and alliances	Popular vote			Seats	
Parties and alliances	Votes	%	±pp	Total	+/−
Spanish Socialist Workers' Party (PSOE)	40,694	57.68	+12.55	17	+4
People's Coalition–Valencian Union (AP–PDP–UL–UV)^{1}	19,801	28.07	+21.33	8	+6
Communist Party of the Valencian Country (PCE–PCPV)	5,743	8.14	−6.19	2	−2
Liberal Democratic Party (PDL)	1,648	2.34	New	0	±0
Democratic and Social Centre (CDS)	1,648	2.34	New	0	±0
Workers' Socialist Party (PST)	654	0.93	New	0	±0
Spanish Democratic Republican Action (ARDE)	359	0.51	±0.00	0	±0
Union of the Democratic Centre (UCD)	n/a	n/a	−27.92	0	−8
Blank ballots	0	0.00	±0.00		
Total	70,547			27	±0
Valid votes	70,547	100.00	+0.85		
Invalid votes	0	0.00	−0.85		
Votes cast / turnout	70,547	62.53	−1.46		
Abstentions	42,279	37.47	+1.46		
Registered voters	112,826				
Sources
Footnotes: ^{1} People's Coalition–Valencian Union results are compared to Democratic Coalition totals in the 1979 election.

=== Elda ===
Population: 53,128

← Summary of the 8 May 1983 City Council of Elda election results →
Parties and alliances	Popular vote			Seats	
Parties and alliances	Votes	%	±pp	Total	+/−
Spanish Socialist Workers' Party (PSOE)	17,218	63.92	+25.26	17	+7
People's Coalition–Valencian Union (AP–PDP–UL–UV)^{1}	6,527	24.23	+15.76	6	+4
Communist Party of the Valencian Country (PCE–PCPV)	1,808	6.71	−13.90	1	−4
Independent Candidacy of Elda (CIE)	1,385	5.14	New	1	+1
Union of the Democratic Centre (UCD)	n/a	n/a	−28.29	0	−8
Blank ballots	0	0.00	±0.00		
Total	26,938			25	±0
Valid votes	26,938	100.00	+0.57		
Invalid votes	0	0.00	−0.57		
Votes cast / turnout	26,938	71.79	+10.59		
Abstentions	10,585	28.21	−10.59		
Registered voters	37,523				
Sources
Footnotes: ^{1} People's Coalition–Valencian Union results are compared to Democratic Coalition totals in the 1979 election.

=== Gandia ===
Population: 48,558

← Summary of the 8 May 1983 City Council of Gandia election results →
Parties and alliances	Popular vote			Seats	
Parties and alliances	Votes	%	±pp	Total	+/−
Spanish Socialist Workers' Party (PSOE)	9,205	37.89	+13.28	9	+3
People's Coalition–Valencian Union (AP–PDP–UV–UL)^{1}	6,759	27.82	+22.49	6	+5
Valencian People's Union (UPV)^{2}	2,928	12.05	+9.89	3	+3
Independent Group (AI)	2,791	11.49	−0.72	2	±0
Communist Party of the Valencian Country (PCE–PCPV)	1,345	5.54	−3.52	1	−1
Democratic and Social Centre (CDS)	886	3.65	New	0	±0
Socialist Action Party (PASOC)	382	1.57	New	0	±0
Union of the Democratic Centre (UCD)	n/a	n/a	−31.75	0	−7
United Left of the Valencian Country (EUPV)	n/a	n/a	−8.18	0	−2
Goal: Gandia (OG)	n/a	n/a	−6.70	0	−1
Blank ballots	0	0.00	±0.00		
Total	24,296			21	±0
Valid votes	24,296	100.00	+1.24		
Invalid votes	0	0.00	−1.24		
Votes cast / turnout	24,296	69.80	−0.93		
Abstentions	10,514	30.20	+0.93		
Registered voters	34,810				
Sources
Footnotes: ^{1} People's Coalition–Valencian Union results are compared to Democratic Coalition totals in the 1979 election.; ^{2} Valencian People's Union results are compared to Nationalist Party of the Valencian Country totals in the 1979 election.

=== Orihuela ===
Population: 50,084

← Summary of the 8 May 1983 City Council of Orihuela election results →
Parties and alliances	Popular vote			Seats	
Parties and alliances	Votes	%	±pp	Total	+/−
People's Coalition–Valencian Union (AP–PDP–UL–UV)^{1}	7,075	30.46	+13.75	9	+5
Spanish Socialist Workers' Party (PSOE)	7,053	30.37	+11.87	9	+4
Democratic and Social Centre (CDS)	5,718	24.62	New	7	+7
Independent Group of Orihuela (AIO)	1,130	4.87	New	0	±0
Communist Party of the Valencian Country (PCE–PCPV)	952	4.10	−5.60	0	−2
Valencian Independent Organization (OIV)	867	3.73	New	0	±0
Liberal Democratic Party (PDL)	429	1.85	New	0	±0
Union of the Democratic Centre (UCD)	n/a	n/a	−52.33	0	−14
Blank ballots	0	0.00	±0.00		
Total	23,224			25	±0
Valid votes	23,224	100.00	+0.91		
Invalid votes	0	0.00	−0.91		
Votes cast / turnout	23,224	66.04	+4.39		
Abstentions	11,940	33.96	−4.39		
Registered voters	35,164				
Sources
Footnotes: ^{1} People's Coalition–Valencian Union results are compared to Democratic Coalition totals in the 1979 election.

=== Paterna ===
Population: 33,237

← Summary of the 8 May 1983 City Council of Paterna election results →
Parties and alliances	Popular vote			Seats	
Parties and alliances	Votes	%	±pp	Total	+/−
Spanish Socialist Workers' Party (PSOE)	9,219	58.26	+19.97	14	+5
People's Coalition–Valencian Union (AP–PDP–UV–UL)	3,728	23.56	New	5	+5
Communist Party of the Valencian Country (PCE–PCPV)	1,706	10.78	−12.04	2	−3
Popular Unity Alternative Candidacy (CAUP)	656	4.15	New	0	±0
Socialist Action Party (PASOC)	515	3.25	New	0	±0
Union of the Democratic Centre (UCD)	n/a	n/a	−18.39	0	−4
Independent Candidacy of the Town of Paterna (AE)	n/a	n/a	−10.11	0	−2
Communist Movement–Organization of Communist Left (MCPV–OEC)	n/a	n/a	−5.76	0	−1
Blank ballots	0	0.00	±0.00		
Total	15,824			21	±0
Valid votes	15,824	100.00	+1.62		
Invalid votes	0	0.00	−1.62		
Votes cast / turnout	15,824	68.18	+3.15		
Abstentions	7,384	31.82	−3.15		
Registered voters	23,208				

=== Sagunto ===
Population: 55,294

← Summary of the 8 May 1983 City Council of Sagunto election results →
Parties and alliances	Popular vote			Seats	
Parties and alliances	Votes	%	±pp	Total	+/−
Spanish Socialist Workers' Party (PSOE)	10,857	41.00	+1.17	11	±0
Communist Party of the Valencian Country (PCE–PCPV)	5,226	19.74	−9.99	5	−3
People's Coalition–Valencian Union (AP–PDP–UV–UL)	4,057	15.32	New	4	+4
Left Independent Electors' Group of Sagunto (IIS)	2,831	10.69	New	2	+2
Valencian Independent Organization (OIV)	2,038	7.70	New	2	+2
Valencian People's Union (UPV)	1,469	5.55	New	1	+1
Union of the Democratic Centre (UCD)	n/a	n/a	−23.52	0	−6
Blank ballots	0	0.00	±0.00		
Total	26,478			25	±0
Valid votes	26,478	100.00	+1.84		
Invalid votes	0	0.00	−1.84		
Votes cast / turnout	26,478	63.53	−2.82		
Abstentions	15,202	36.47	+2.82		
Registered voters	41,680				

=== Torrent ===
Population: 51,762

← Summary of the 8 May 1983 City Council of Torrent election results →
Parties and alliances	Popular vote			Seats	
Parties and alliances	Votes	%	±pp	Total	+/−
Spanish Socialist Workers' Party (PSOE)	14,941	58.87	+18.77	15	+6
People's Coalition–Valencian Union (AP–PDP–UV–UL)	7,924	31.22	New	8	+8
Communist Party of the Valencian Country (PCE–PCPV)	1,920	7.56	−9.10	2	−2
Valencian People's Union (UPV)	596	2.35	New	0	±0
Union of the Democratic Centre (UCD)	n/a	n/a	−33.96	0	−8
Blank ballots	0	0.00	±0.00		
Total	25,381			25	+4
Valid votes	25,381	100.00	+1.16		
Invalid votes	0	0.00	−1.16		
Votes cast / turnout	25,381	69.95	+2.80		
Abstentions	10,901	30.05	−2.80		
Registered voters	36,282				

=== Torrevieja ===
Population: 12,321

← Summary of the 8 May 1983 City Council of Torrevieja election results →
Parties and alliances	Popular vote			Seats	
Parties and alliances	Votes	%	±pp	Total	+/−
Spanish Socialist Workers' Party (PSOE)	4,318	65.90	+18.93	12	+3
People's Coalition–Valencian Union (AP–PDP–UL–UV)^{1}	1,612	24.60	+13.25	4	+2
Socialist Action Party (PASOC)^{2}	340	5.19	−2.44	1	±0
Communist Party of the Valencian Country (PCE–PCPV)	282	4.30	−2.28	0	−1
Union of the Democratic Centre (UCD)	n/a	n/a	−24.22	0	−4
Blank ballots	0	0.00	±0.00		
Total	6,552			17	±0
Valid votes	6,552	100.00	+1.03		
Invalid votes	0	0.00	−1.03		
Votes cast / turnout	6,552	68.16	−0.17		
Abstentions	3,060	31.84	+0.17		
Registered voters	9,612				
Sources
Footnotes: ^{1} People's Coalition–Valencian Union results are compared to Democratic Coalition totals in the 1979 election.; ^{2} Socialist Action Party results are compared to Spanish Socialist Workers' Party (historical) totals in the 1979 elections.

=== Valencia ===
Population: 744,748

== See also ==
- 1983 Valencian regional election
