= 1979 Spanish local elections in the Valencian Community =

This article presents the results breakdown of the local elections held in the Valencian Community on 3 April 1979. The following tables show detailed results in the autonomous community's most populous municipalities, sorted alphabetically.

== City control ==
The following table lists party control in the most populous municipalities, including provincial capitals (highlighted in bold).

Municipality	Population	New control
Alcoy	64,545	Spanish Socialist Workers' Party (PSOE)
**Alicante**	232,019	Spanish Socialist Workers' Party (PSOE)
Benidorm	25,260	Union of the Democratic Centre (UCD)
**Castellón de la Plana**	115,522	Spanish Socialist Workers' Party (PSOE)
Elche	160,071	Spanish Socialist Workers' Party (PSOE)
Elda	52,214	Spanish Socialist Workers' Party (PSOE)
Gandia	46,248	Union of the Democratic Centre (UCD)
Orihuela	50,245	Union of the Democratic Centre (UCD) (PSOE in 1982)
Paterna	32,331	Spanish Socialist Workers' Party (PSOE)
Sagunto	56,351	Spanish Socialist Workers' Party (PSOE)
Torrent	49,833	Spanish Socialist Workers' Party (PSOE)
Torrevieja	12,735	Spanish Socialist Workers' Party (PSOE)
**Valencia**	737,129	Spanish Socialist Workers' Party (PSOE)

== Municipalities ==
=== Alcoy ===
Population: 64,545

Summary of the 3 April 1979 City Council of Alcoy election results →
Parties and alliances	Popular vote			Seats	
Parties and alliances	Votes	%	±pp	Total	+/−
Spanish Socialist Workers' Party (PSOE)	13,558	42.17	n/a	11	n/a
Union of the Democratic Centre (UCD)	11,408	35.49	n/a	10	n/a
Communist Party of Spain (PCE)	5,331	16.58	n/a	4	n/a
Democratic Coalition (CD)	1,047	3.26	n/a	0	n/a
Party of Labour of the Valencian Country (PTPV)	598	1.86	n/a	0	n/a
Revolutionary Communist League (LCR)	150	0.47	n/a	0	n/a
Blank ballots	56	0.17	n/a		
Total	32,148			25	n/a
Valid votes	32,148	99.54	n/a		
Invalid votes	147	0.46	n/a		
Votes cast / turnout	32,295	70.31	n/a		
Abstentions	13,638	29.69	n/a		
Registered voters	45,933				

=== Alicante ===
Population: 232,019

Summary of the 3 April 1979 City Council of Alicante election results →
Parties and alliances	Popular vote			Seats	
Parties and alliances	Votes	%	±pp	Total	+/−
Spanish Socialist Workers' Party (PSOE)	39,436	43.33	n/a	13	n/a
Union of the Democratic Centre (UCD)	28,550	31.37	n/a	10	n/a
Communist Party of Spain (PCE)	12,383	13.60	n/a	4	n/a
Independent Alicante (APA)	4,300	4.72	n/a	0	n/a
Democratic Coalition (CD)	2,691	2.96	n/a	0	n/a
Spanish Socialist Workers' Party (historical) (PSOEh)	1,182	1.30	n/a	0	n/a
Workers' Revolutionary Organization (ORT)	815	0.90	n/a	0	n/a
Communist Movement of the Valencian Country (MCPV)	562	0.62	n/a	0	n/a
Spanish Democratic Republican Action (ARDE)	406	0.45	n/a	0	n/a
Revolutionary Communist League (LCR)	375	0.41	n/a	0	n/a
Republican Left (IR)	323	0.35	n/a	0	n/a
Blank ballots	0	0.00	n/a		
Total	91,023			27	n/a
Valid votes	91,023	99.16	n/a		
Invalid votes	769	0.84	n/a		
Votes cast / turnout	91,792	57.76	n/a		
Abstentions	67,141	42.24	n/a		
Registered voters	158,933				

=== Benidorm ===
Population: 25,260

Summary of the 3 April 1979 City Council of Benidorm election results →
Parties and alliances	Popular vote			Seats	
Parties and alliances	Votes	%	±pp	Total	+/−
Spanish Socialist Workers' Party (PSOE)	2,838	31.37	n/a	7	n/a
Union of the Democratic Centre (UCD)	2,837	31.36	n/a	7	n/a
Benidorm Independent Group (AIB)	1,111	12.28	n/a	3	n/a
Communist Party of Spain (PCE)	880	9.73	n/a	2	n/a
Nationalist Party of the Valencian Country (PNPV)	622	6.88	n/a	1	n/a
Democratic Coalition (CD)	534	5.90	n/a	1	n/a
Spanish Democratic Republican Action (ARDE)	225	2.49	n/a	0	n/a
Blank ballots	0	0.00	n/a		
Total	9,047			21	n/a
Valid votes	9,047	98.70	n/a		
Invalid votes	119	1.30	n/a		
Votes cast / turnout	9,166	54.53	n/a		
Abstentions	7,643	45.47	n/a		
Registered voters	16,809				

=== Castellón de la Plana ===
Population: 115,522

Summary of the 3 April 1979 City Council of Castellón de la Plana election results →
Parties and alliances	Popular vote			Seats	
Parties and alliances	Votes	%	±pp	Total	+/−
Spanish Socialist Workers' Party (PSOE)	21,757	40.80	n/a	12	n/a
Union of the Democratic Centre (UCD)	19,550	36.66	n/a	10	n/a
Independent Left of Castellón (EIC)	4,146	7.77	n/a	2	n/a
Communist Party of the Valencian Country (PCPV)	3,866	7.25	n/a	2	n/a
Democratic Coalition (CD)	2,702	5.07	n/a	1	n/a
National Union (UN)	1,056	1.98	n/a	0	n/a
Party of Labour of the Valencian Country (PTPV)	254	0.48	n/a	0	n/a
Communist Movement–Organization of Communist Left (MC–OEC)	0	0.00	n/a	0	n/a
Workers' Revolutionary Organization (ORT)	0	0.00	n/a	0	n/a
Blank ballots	0	0.00	n/a		
Total	53,331			27	n/a
Valid votes	53,331	98.73	n/a		
Invalid votes	688	1.27	n/a		
Votes cast / turnout	54,019	66.50	n/a		
Abstentions	27,215	33.50	n/a		
Registered voters	81,234				

=== Elche ===
Population: 160,071

Summary of the 3 April 1979 City Council of Elche election results →
Parties and alliances	Popular vote			Seats	
Parties and alliances	Votes	%	±pp	Total	+/−
Spanish Socialist Workers' Party (PSOE)	30,351	45.13	n/a	13	n/a
Union of the Democratic Centre (UCD)	18,777	27.92	n/a	8	n/a
Communist Party of Spain (PCE)	9,636	14.33	n/a	4	n/a
Democratic Coalition (CD)	4,535	6.74	n/a	2	n/a
Workers' Communist Party (PCT)	1,299	1.93	n/a	0	n/a
Independent Candidacy of the Countryside (CIC)	1,259	1.87	New	0	±0
Workers' Revolutionary Organization (ORT)	634	0.94	n/a	0	n/a
Spanish Democratic Republican Action (ARDE)	344	0.51	n/a	0	n/a
Communist Movement of the Valencian Country (MCPV)	180	0.27	n/a	0	n/a
Republican Left (IR)	158	0.23	n/a	0	n/a
For the Popular Unity Coalition (CPUP)	81	0.12	n/a	0	n/a
Blank ballots	0	0.00	n/a		
Total	67,254			27	n/a
Valid votes	67,254	99.15	n/a		
Invalid votes	576	0.85	n/a		
Votes cast / turnout	67,830	63.99	n/a		
Abstentions	38,177	36.01	n/a		
Registered voters	106,007				

=== Elda ===
Population: 52,214

Summary of the 3 April 1979 City Council of Elda election results →
Parties and alliances	Popular vote			Seats	
Parties and alliances	Votes	%	±pp	Total	+/−
Spanish Socialist Workers' Party (PSOE)	8,273	38.66	n/a	10	n/a
Union of the Democratic Centre (UCD)	6,054	28.29	n/a	8	n/a
Communist Party of Spain (PCE)	4,411	20.61	n/a	5	n/a
Democratic Coalition (CD)	1,812	8.47	n/a	2	n/a
Communist Movement–Organization of Communist Left (MCPV–OEC)	718	3.36	n/a	0	n/a
Workers' Revolutionary Organization (ORT)	132	0.62	n/a	0	n/a
Blank ballots	0	0.00	n/a		
Total	21,400			25	n/a
Valid votes	21,400	99.43	n/a		
Invalid votes	123	0.57	n/a		
Votes cast / turnout	21,523	61.20	n/a		
Abstentions	13,644	38.80	n/a		
Registered voters	35,167				

=== Gandia ===
Population: 46,248

Summary of the 3 April 1979 City Council of Gandia election results →
Parties and alliances	Popular vote			Seats	
Parties and alliances	Votes	%	±pp	Total	+/−
Union of the Democratic Centre (UCD)	6,958	31.75	n/a	7	n/a
Spanish Socialist Workers' Party (PSOE)	5,392	24.61	n/a	6	n/a
Independent Group (AI)	2,675	12.21	n/a	2	n/a
Communist Party of the Valencian Country (PCPV)	1,986	9.06	n/a	2	n/a
United Left of the Valencian Country (EUPV)	1,792	8.18	n/a	2	n/a
Goal: Gandia (OG)	1,468	6.70	n/a	1	n/a
Democratic Coalition (CD)	1,168	5.33	n/a	1	n/a
Nationalist Party of the Valencian Country (PNPV)	473	2.16	n/a	0	n/a
Blank ballots	0	0.00	n/a		
Total	21,912			21	n/a
Valid votes	21,912	98.76	n/a		
Invalid votes	276	1.24	n/a		
Votes cast / turnout	22,188	70.73	n/a		
Abstentions	9,184	29.27	n/a		
Registered voters	31,372				

=== Orihuela ===
Population: 50,245

Summary of the 3 April 1979 City Council of Orihuela election results →
Parties and alliances	Popular vote			Seats	
Parties and alliances	Votes	%	±pp	Total	+/−
Union of the Democratic Centre (UCD)	10,871	52.33	n/a	14	n/a
Spanish Socialist Workers' Party (PSOE)	3,844	18.50	n/a	5	n/a
Democratic Coalition (CD)	3,471	16.71	n/a	4	n/a
Communist Party of Spain (PCE)	2,016	9.70	n/a	2	n/a
Carlist Party (PC)	573	2.76	n/a	0	n/a
Blank ballots	0	0.00	n/a		
Total	20,775			25	n/a
Valid votes	20,775	99.09	n/a		
Invalid votes	191	0.91	n/a		
Votes cast / turnout	20,966	61.65	n/a		
Abstentions	13,040	38.35	n/a		
Registered voters	34,006				

=== Paterna ===
Population: 32,331

Summary of the 3 April 1979 City Council of Paterna election results →
Parties and alliances	Popular vote			Seats	
Parties and alliances	Votes	%	±pp	Total	+/−
Spanish Socialist Workers' Party (PSOE)	5,316	38.29	n/a	9	n/a
Communist Party of the Valencian Country (PCPV)	3,168	22.82	n/a	5	n/a
Union of the Democratic Centre (UCD)	2,553	18.39	n/a	4	n/a
Independent Candidacy of the Town of Paterna (AE)	1,403	10.11	n/a	2	n/a
Communist Movement–Organization of Communist Left (MCPV–OEC)	800	5.76	n/a	1	n/a
Valencian Front Socialist–Republican Alliance (ARSFV)	489	3.52	n/a	0	n/a
Workers' Revolutionary Organization (ORT)	154	1.11	n/a	0	n/a
Blank ballots	0	0.00	n/a		
Total	13,883			21	n/a
Valid votes	13,883	98.38	n/a		
Invalid votes	229	1.62	n/a		
Votes cast / turnout	14,112	65.03	n/a		
Abstentions	7,589	34.97	n/a		
Registered voters	21,701				

=== Sagunto ===
Population: 56,351

Summary of the 3 April 1979 City Council of Sagunto election results →
Parties and alliances	Popular vote			Seats	
Parties and alliances	Votes	%	±pp	Total	+/−
Spanish Socialist Workers' Party (PSOE)	10,466	39.83	n/a	11	n/a
Communist Party of the Valencian Country (PCPV)	7,812	29.73	n/a	8	n/a
Union of the Democratic Centre (UCD)	6,180	23.52	n/a	6	n/a
Communist Movement–Organization of Communist Left (MCPV–OEC)	1,066	4.06	n/a	0	n/a
Workers' Revolutionary Organization (ORT)	473	1.80	n/a	0	n/a
Republican Left (IR)	190	0.72	n/a	0	n/a
Communist Unification of Spain (UCE)	90	0.34	n/a	0	n/a
Blank ballots	0	0.00	n/a		
Total	26,277			25	n/a
Valid votes	26,277	98.16	n/a		
Invalid votes	493	1.84	n/a		
Votes cast / turnout	26,770	66.35	n/a		
Abstentions	13,574	33.65	n/a		
Registered voters	40,344				

=== Torrent ===
Population: 49,833

Summary of the 3 April 1979 City Council of Torrent election results →
Parties and alliances	Popular vote			Seats	
Parties and alliances	Votes	%	±pp	Total	+/−
Spanish Socialist Workers' Party (PSOE)	8,788	40.10	n/a	9	n/a
Union of the Democratic Centre (UCD)	7,441	33.96	n/a	8	n/a
Communist Party of the Valencian Country (PCPV)	3,651	16.66	n/a	4	n/a
Liberal Party (PL)	893	4.08	n/a	0	n/a
Workers' Revolutionary Organization (ORT)	579	2.64	n/a	0	n/a
Communist Movement–Organization of Communist Left (MCPV–OEC)	561	2.56	n/a	0	n/a
Blank ballots	0	0.00	n/a		
Total	21,913			21	n/a
Valid votes	21,913	98.84	n/a		
Invalid votes	257	1.16	n/a		
Votes cast / turnout	22,170	67.15	n/a		
Abstentions	10,844	32.85	n/a		
Registered voters	33,014				

=== Torrevieja ===
Population: 12,735

Summary of the 3 April 1979 City Council of Torrevieja election results →
Parties and alliances	Popular vote			Seats	
Parties and alliances	Votes	%	±pp	Total	+/−
Spanish Socialist Workers' Party (PSOE)	2,670	46.97	n/a	9	n/a
Union of the Democratic Centre (UCD)	1,377	24.22	n/a	4	n/a
Democratic Coalition (CD)	645	11.35	n/a	2	n/a
Spanish Socialist Workers' Party (historical) (PSOEh)	434	7.63	n/a	1	n/a
Communist Party of Spain (PCE)	374	6.58	n/a	1	n/a
Popular Unity Candidacy (CUP)	185	3.25	n/a	0	n/a
Blank ballots	0	0.00	n/a		
Total	5,685			17	n/a
Valid votes	5,685	98.97	n/a		
Invalid votes	59	1.03	n/a		
Votes cast / turnout	5,744	68.33	n/a		
Abstentions	2,662	31.67	n/a		
Registered voters	8,406				

=== Valencia ===
Population: 737,129
