= Democratic Union of the Valencian Country =

Spanish political party

Democratic Union of the Valencian Country Unió Democràtica del País Valencià
- Leader: Vicente Ruiz Monrabal
- Founded: 1962
- Dissolved: 1977
- Ideology: Christian democracy Valencian nationalism Federalism; Anti-fascism
- Political position: Centre-right

Democratic Union of the Valencian Country (in Catalan: Unió Democràtica del País Valencià, UDPV) was a political party in the Valencian Country, Spain. It was founded clandestinely in the University of Valencia in 1962. The party was illegal until 1977.

== History ==
The UDPV originally had about 50 members. The most prominent leaders of the organization in the 1960s were Vicente Ruiz Monrabal, Vicent Diego, Francesc Fayos and Empar Escrivà.

The founding meeting was held in May 1964, signing a cooperation pact with the Democratic Union of Catalonia in May 1965. In collaboration with communist activists, UDPV participated in the campaign against the Francoist referendum in 1968. UDPV also maintained some contacts with the Valencian Socialist Party. In March 1973 the party attended the First Conference of the Christian Democratic Team of the Spanish State (EDCEE) at the Abbey of Montserrat, entering the "team" in November of that year.

The second and third congresses of the party were held in 1974 and 1976, respectively. In the Spanish elections of 1977 run with the Federation of Christian Democracy as the Christian Democratic Team of the Spanish State in the Valencian Country, gaining the 2.6% of the vote. The party disappeared later that year.

== See also ==
- Valencian Socialist Party
- Valencian Socialist Action
- Christian Democratic Team of the Spanish State
