= Unified Socialist Party of the Valencian Country =

Unified Socialist Party of the Valencian Country Partit Socialista Unificat del País Valencià
- Secretary-General: Domènec Sorneguet
- Founded: 1977
- Dissolved: 1984
- Merged into: Valencian People's Unity
- Ideology: Marxism; Valencian nationalism
- Political position: Left-wing

Party flag

The Unified Socialist Party of the Valencian Country (Valencian: Partit Socialista Unificat del País Valencià, PSUPV) was a Valencian political party created in 1977 by the Comunistes Independents del País Valencià ("Independent Communists of the Valencian Country"), a group of Valencian communists previously linked to the Valencian Marxist Front (FMV) who were disillusioned with the timid nationalist policies of the Communist Party of the Valencian Country (PCPV), as well as some members of the Nationalist Party of the Valencian Country (PNPV) left-wing faction. The party was led by Domènec Serneguet, its general secretary, and was officially registered in January 1978.

Although inspired by the Unified Socialist Party of Catalonia and seeking to join it, in practice, the PSUPV aligned itself with the Socialist Party of National Liberation (PSAN) and had established contacts with the Marxist Unification Movement (MUM) of Catalonia by 1978. Its ideology revolved around the fight for "the unity of the national and class movement" and "the unity of communists and Marxist socialists", while acknowledging the "evident historical, linguistic, cultural, and geographical ties" with Catalonia, the Balearic Islands, and the rest of the Catalan Countries. The party would eventually join and merge into the Valencian People's Unity (UPV) alliance in the 1982 Spanish general election.
