= 1995 Spanish local elections in the Valencian Community =

This article presents the results breakdown of the local elections held in the Valencian Community on 28 May 1995. The following tables show detailed results in the autonomous community's most populous municipalities, sorted alphabetically.

== City control ==
The following table lists party control in the most populous municipalities, including provincial capitals (highlighted in bold). Gains for a party are highlighted in that party's colour.

Municipality	Population	Previous control	New control
Alcoy	64,291	Spanish Socialist Workers' Party (PSOE)	Spanish Socialist Workers' Party (PSOE)
**Alicante**	274,964	Spanish Socialist Workers' Party (PSOE)	People's Party (PP)
Benidorm	46,493	People's Party (PP)	People's Party (PP)
**Castellón de la Plana**	139,094	People's Party (PP)	People's Party (PP)
Elche	191,305	Spanish Socialist Workers' Party (PSOE)	Spanish Socialist Workers' Party (PSOE)
Elda	55,563	Spanish Socialist Workers' Party (PSOE)	People's Party (PP) (PSOE in 1996)
Gandia	57,186	Spanish Socialist Workers' Party (PSOE)	Spanish Socialist Workers' Party (PSOE)
Orihuela	51,765	People's Party (PP)	People's Party (PP)
Paterna	45,944	Spanish Socialist Workers' Party (PSOE)	Spanish Socialist Workers' Party (PSOE)
Sagunto	57,630	Spanish Socialist Workers' Party (PSOE)	Spanish Socialist Workers' Party (PSOE) (PP in 1997)
Torrent	60,617	Spanish Socialist Workers' Party (PSOE)	Spanish Socialist Workers' Party (PSOE)
Torrevieja	29,955	People's Party (PP)	People's Party (PP)
**Valencia**	764,293	People's Party (PP)	People's Party (PP)

== Municipalities ==
=== Alcoy ===
Population: 64,291

← Summary of the 28 May 1995 City Council of Alcoy election results →
Parties and alliances	Popular vote			Seats	
Parties and alliances	Votes	%	±pp	Total	+/−
Spanish Socialist Workers' Party (PSOE)	15,216	41.42	−17.18	11	−5
People's Party (PP)	12,848	34.98	+13.70	10	+4
United Left–The Greens (EU–EV)	6,175	16.81	+6.23	4	+1
Nationalists of Alcoy (NdA)	1,019	2.77	+1.57	0	±0
Independent Democratic Union (UDI)	872	2.37	New	0	±0
Spanish Phalanx of the CNSO (FE–JONS)	103	0.28	−0.10	0	±0
Blank ballots	500	1.36	+0.51		
Total	36,733			25	±0
Valid votes	36,733	99.43	−0.12		
Invalid votes	210	0.57	+0.12		
Votes cast / turnout	36,943	73.72	+8.54		
Abstentions	13,172	26.28	−8.54		
Registered voters	50,115				

=== Alicante ===
Population: 274,964

← Summary of the 28 May 1995 City Council of Alicante election results →
Parties and alliances	Popular vote			Seats	
Parties and alliances	Votes	%	±pp	Total	+/−
People's Party (PP)	72,004	48.12	+12.58	14	+2
Spanish Socialist Workers' Party (PSOE)	54,120	36.17	−2.08	10	−2
United Left–The Greens (EU–EV)^{1}	17,262	11.54	+1.33	3	+1
Civic Solidarity of Alicante (SCAL)	1,521	1.02	−4.89	0	−1
United Alicante (AU)	1,192	0.80	New	0	±0
Independent Democratic Union (UDI)	575	0.38	New	0	±0
Communist Party of the Peoples of Spain (PCPE)	378	0.25	New	0	±0
Republican Left of Catalonia (ERC)	283	0.19	New	0	±0
Spanish Phalanx of the CNSO (FE–JONS)	182	0.12	−0.10	0	±0
Alicantine Provincial Union (UPRA)	173	0.12	New	0	±0
Progressive Bloc (BP)	134	0.09	New	0	±0
Blank ballots	1,816	1.21	+0.17		
Total	149,640			27	±0
Valid votes	149,640	99.40	−0.22		
Invalid votes	908	0.60	+0.22		
Votes cast / turnout	150,548	70.23	+14.10		
Abstentions	63,806	29.77	−14.10		
Registered voters	214,354				
Sources
Footnotes: ^{1} United Left–The Greens results are compared to the combined totals of United Left of the Valencian Country and The Greens in the 1991 election.

=== Benidorm ===
Population: 46,493

← Summary of the 28 May 1995 City Council of Benidorm election results →
Parties and alliances	Popular vote			Seats	
Parties and alliances	Votes	%	±pp	Total	+/−
People's Party (PP)	11,432	49.89	+10.65	12	+2
Spanish Socialist Workers' Party (PSOE)	7,369	32.16	−9.36	7	−4
United Left–The Greens (EU–EV)^{1}	2,188	9.55	+2.95	2	+2
Valencian People's Union–Nationalist Bloc (UPV–BN)	676	2.95	−0.58	0	±0
Independent Socialist Party (PSI)	601	2.62	−0.97	0	±0
Valencian Union–Independents–Centrists (UV–FICVA–CCV)	297	1.30	+0.31	0	±0
Alicantine Provincial Union (UPRA)	11	0.05	New	0	±0
Blank ballots	340	1.48	+0.38		
Total	22,914			21	±0
Valid votes	22,914	99.39	−0.15		
Invalid votes	140	0.61	+0.15		
Votes cast / turnout	23,054	67.85	+6.05		
Abstentions	10,922	32.15	−6.05		
Registered voters	33,976				
Sources
Footnotes: ^{1} United Left–The Greens results are compared to the combined totals of United Left of the Valencian Country and The Greens in the 1991 election.

=== Castellón de la Plana ===
Population: 139,094

← Summary of the 28 May 1995 City Council of Castellón de la Plana election results →
Parties and alliances	Popular vote			Seats	
Parties and alliances	Votes	%	±pp	Total	+/−
People's Party (PP)	40,467	53.87	+15.52	16	+2
Spanish Socialist Workers' Party (PSOE)	20,180	26.86	−9.01	8	−5
United Left–The Greens (EU–EV)^{1}	6,900	9.19	+1.99	2	+2
Valencian People's Union–United Grao (UPV–GU)^{2}	4,278	5.69	−2.12	1	+1
Valencian Union–Independents–Centrists (UV–FICVA–CCV)	1,401	1.86	−1.12	0	±0
Democratic and Social Centre (CDS)	482	0.64	−2.87	0	±0
Left Alternative of Castellón (EAC)	261	0.35	New	0	±0
Platform of Independents of Spain (PIE)	153	0.20	New	0	±0
Blank ballots	999	1.33	+0.07		
Total	75,121			27	±0
Valid votes	75,121	99.27	−0.19		
Invalid votes	556	0.73	+0.19		
Votes cast / turnout	75,677	68.73	+8.40		
Abstentions	34,429	31.27	−8.40		
Registered voters	110,106				
Sources
Footnotes: ^{1} United Left–The Greens results are compared to the combined totals of United Left of the Valencian Country and The Greens in the 1991 election.; ^{2} Valencian People's Union–United Grao results are compared to the combined totals of Valencian People's Union and United Grao in the 1991 election.

=== Elche ===
Population: 191,305

← Summary of the 28 May 1995 City Council of Elche election results →
Parties and alliances	Popular vote			Seats	
Parties and alliances	Votes	%	±pp	Total	+/−
People's Party (PP)	45,428	44.32	+16.21	13	+5
Spanish Socialist Workers' Party (PSOE)	37,221	36.31	−17.38	11	−5
United Left–The Greens (EU–EV)	12,735	12.42	+5.03	3	+1
Democratic and Social Centre (CDS)	2,378	2.32	−3.40	0	−1
Valencian Union–Independents–Centrists (UV–FICVA–CCV)	1,626	1.59	+0.06	0	±0
Neighbours for El Altet Independent Party (PIVA)	1,183	1.15	New	0	±0
Valencian People's Union–Nationalist Bloc (UPV–BN)	800	0.78	−0.46	0	±0
Blank ballots	1,132	1.10	−0.23		
Total	102,503			27	±0
Valid votes	102,503	99.49	+0.11		
Invalid votes	528	0.51	−0.11		
Votes cast / turnout	103,031	71.30	+9.85		
Abstentions	41,471	28.70	−9.85		
Registered voters	144,502				

=== Elda ===
Population: 55,563

← Summary of the 28 May 1995 City Council of Elda election results →
Parties and alliances	Popular vote			Seats	
Parties and alliances	Votes	%	±pp	Total	+/−
People's Party (PP)	14,343	47.10	+21.76	12	+6
Spanish Socialist Workers' Party (PSOE)	9,976	32.76	−8.90	9	−2
United Left–The Greens (EU–EV)	4,498	14.77	+6.89	4	+2
Democratic and Social Centre (CDS)	1,015	3.33	−19.49	0	−6
Independent Elda Party (PEI)	199	0.65	New	0	±0
Blank ballots	420	1.38	+0.32		
Total	30,451			25	±0
Valid votes	30,451	99.48	−0.05		
Invalid votes	159	0.52	+0.05		
Votes cast / turnout	30,610	71.91	+7.05		
Abstentions	11,957	28.09	−7.05		
Registered voters	42,567				

=== Gandia ===
Population: 57,186

← Summary of the 28 May 1995 City Council of Gandia election results →
Parties and alliances	Popular vote			Seats	
Parties and alliances	Votes	%	±pp	Total	+/−
Spanish Socialist Workers' Party (PSOE)	12,770	37.27	−0.44	10	−1
People's Party (PP)	12,106	35.33	+10.08	9	+2
Valencian People's Union–Nationalist Bloc (UPV–BN)	3,211	9.37	−3.56	2	−1
Valencian Union–Independents–Centrists (UV–FICVA–CCV)	2,846	8.31	−5.58	2	−2
United Left–The Greens (EU–EV)	2,543	7.42	+3.01	2	+2
Valencianist Renewal (RV)	357	1.04	New	0	±0
Blank ballots	430	1.25	−0.07		
Total	34,263			25	±0
Valid votes	34,263	99.49	+0.10		
Invalid votes	177	0.51	−0.10		
Votes cast / turnout	34,440	74.81	+3.86		
Abstentions	11,594	25.19	−3.86		
Registered voters	46,034				

=== Orihuela ===
Population: 51,765

← Summary of the 28 May 1995 City Council of Orihuela election results →
Parties and alliances	Popular vote			Seats	
Parties and alliances	Votes	%	±pp	Total	+/−
People's Party (PP)	17,114	63.31	+5.68	17	+3
Spanish Socialist Workers' Party (PSOE)	7,117	26.33	+0.62	7	+1
United Left–The Greens (EU–EV)	1,445	5.35	+2.41	1	+1
Orihuela and its Districts (ORYSPE)	579	2.14	New	0	±0
Popular Unity of Independents (UPDI)	199	0.74	New	0	±0
Communist Party of the Peoples of Spain (PCPE)	145	0.54	New	0	±0
Valencian People's Union–Nationalist Bloc (UPV–BN)	3	0.01	New	0	±0
Democratic and Social Centre (CDS)	n/a	n/a	−7.74	0	−1
Blank ballots	429	1.59	+0.88		
Total	27,031			25	+4
Valid votes	27,031	99.52	−0.08		
Invalid votes	131	0.48	+0.08		
Votes cast / turnout	27,162	76.04	+2.67		
Abstentions	8,557	23.96	−2.67		
Registered voters	35,719				

=== Paterna ===
Population: 45,944

← Summary of the 28 May 1995 City Council of Paterna election results →
Parties and alliances	Popular vote			Seats	
Parties and alliances	Votes	%	±pp	Total	+/−
People's Party (PP)	9,476	39.64	+17.04	9	+4
Spanish Socialist Workers' Party (PSOE)	7,547	31.57	−13.54	7	−4
United Left–The Greens (EU–EV)	4,716	19.73	+7.69	4	+1
Valencian Union–Independents–Centrists (UV–FICVA–CCV)	1,683	7.04	−4.96	1	−1
Alicantine Provincial Union (UPRA)	175	0.73	New	0	±0
Blank ballots	306	1.28	+0.08		
Total	23,903			21	±0
Valid votes	23,903	99.29	+0.02		
Invalid votes	171	0.71	−0.02		
Votes cast / turnout	24,074	70.48	+13.09		
Abstentions	10,085	29.52	−13.09		
Registered voters	34,159				

=== Sagunto ===
Population: 57,630

← Summary of the 28 May 1995 City Council of Sagunto election results →
Parties and alliances	Popular vote			Seats	
Parties and alliances	Votes	%	±pp	Total	+/−
Spanish Socialist Workers' Party (PSOE)	8,679	27.47	−9.53	8	−3
People's Party (PP)	6,201	19.63	+10.99	5	+3
Independent Candidacy for Sagunto (CIPS)	5,571	17.63	−9.59	5	−3
United Left–The Greens (EU–EV)	5,354	16.95	+6.97	4	+1
Democratic and Social Centre (CDS)	2,425	7.68	+2.07	2	+1
Valencian People's Union–Nationalist Bloc (UPV–BN)	1,786	5.65	+0.98	1	+1
Valencian Union–Independents–Centrists (UV–FICVA–CCV)	1,334	4.22	−0.08	0	±0
Blank ballots	241	0.76	+0.09		
Total	31,591			25	±0
Valid votes	31,591	99.53	+0.04		
Invalid votes	148	0.47	−0.04		
Votes cast / turnout	31,739	70.03	+8.05		
Abstentions	13,584	29.97	−8.05		
Registered voters	45,323				

=== Torrent ===
Population: 60,617

← Summary of the 28 May 1995 City Council of Torrent election results →
Parties and alliances	Popular vote			Seats	
Parties and alliances	Votes	%	±pp	Total	+/−
Spanish Socialist Workers' Party (PSOE)	13,886	42.84	−15.21	11	−5
People's Party (PP)	11,957	36.88	+14.87	10	+4
United Left–The Greens (EU–EV)	3,159	9.74	+4.61	2	+1
Valencian Union–Independents–Centrists (UV–FICVA–CCV)	2,397	7.39	−2.81	2	±0
Valencian People's Union–Nationalist Bloc (UPV–BN)	382	1.18	+0.03	0	±0
Valencian Independent Organization (OIV)	234	0.72	New	0	±0
Valencianist Renewal (RV)	22	0.07	New	0	±0
Blank ballots	380	1.17	+0.36		
Total	32,417			25	±0
Valid votes	32,417	99.51	+0.14		
Invalid votes	159	0.49	−0.14		
Votes cast / turnout	32,576	70.20	+8.14		
Abstentions	13,829	29.80	−8.14		
Registered voters	46,405				

=== Torrevieja ===
Population: 29,955

← Summary of the 28 May 1995 City Council of Torrevieja election results →
Parties and alliances	Popular vote			Seats	
Parties and alliances	Votes	%	±pp	Total	+/−
People's Party (PP)	7,032	54.47	−0.78	12	−1
Spanish Socialist Workers' Party (PSOE)	3,414	26.44	−4.93	6	−1
United Left–The Greens (EU–EV)	1,995	15.45	+7.08	3	+2
Democratic and Social Centre (CDS)	286	2.22	−2.14	0	±0
The Greens–Green Group (LV–GV)	61	0.47	New	0	±0
Blank ballots	122	0.95	+0.30		
Total	12,910			21	±0
Valid votes	12,910	99.22	−0.29		
Invalid votes	101	0.78	+0.29		
Votes cast / turnout	13,011	65.36	−1.90		
Abstentions	6,895	34.64	+1.90		
Registered voters	19,906				

=== Valencia ===
Population: 764,293

== See also ==
- 1995 Valencian regional election
