= 1999 Spanish local elections in the Valencian Community =

This article presents the results breakdown of the local elections held in the Valencian Community on 13 June 1999. The following tables show detailed results in the autonomous community's most populous municipalities, sorted alphabetically.

== City control ==
The following table lists party control in the most populous municipalities, including provincial capitals (highlighted in bold). Gains for a party are highlighted in that party's colour.

Municipality	Population	Previous control	New control
Alcoy	60,476	Spanish Socialist Workers' Party (PSOE)	Spanish Socialist Workers' Party (PSOE) (PP in 2000)
**Alicante**	272,432	People's Party (PP)	People's Party (PP)
Benidorm	50,946	People's Party (PP)	People's Party (PP)
**Castellón de la Plana**	137,741	People's Party (PP)	People's Party (PP)
Elche	191,713	Spanish Socialist Workers' Party (PSOE)	Spanish Socialist Workers' Party (PSOE)
Elda	52,490	Spanish Socialist Workers' Party (PSOE)	Spanish Socialist Workers' Party (PSOE)
Gandia	57,518	Spanish Socialist Workers' Party (PSOE)	Spanish Socialist Workers' Party (PSOE)
Orihuela	50,581	People's Party (PP)	People's Party (PP)
Paterna	46,380	Spanish Socialist Workers' Party (PSOE)	Spanish Socialist Workers' Party (PSOE)
Sagunto	56,607	People's Party (PP)	People's Party (PP)
Torrent	62,562	Spanish Socialist Workers' Party (PSOE)	Spanish Socialist Workers' Party (PSOE)
Torrevieja	38,336	People's Party (PP)	People's Party (PP)
**Valencia**	739,412	People's Party (PP)	People's Party (PP)

== Municipalities ==
=== Alcoy ===
Population: 60,476

← Summary of the 13 June 1999 City Council of Alcoy election results →
Parties and alliances	Popular vote			Seats	
Parties and alliances	Votes	%	±pp	Total	+/−
People's Party (PP)	14,101	41.21	+6.23	12	+2
Spanish Socialist Workers' Party (PSOE)	10,977	32.08	−9.34	10	−1
United Left of the Valencian Country (EUPV)	3,210	9.38	−7.43	2	−2
Democratic Party of the New Left (PDNE)	1,741	5.09	New	1	+1
Bloc–Nationalists of Alcoy–The Greens (BNdA–EV)^{1}	1,524	4.45	+1.68	0	±0
Independent Democratic Union (UDI)	926	2.71	+0.34	0	±0
Independent Initiative (II)	548	1.60	New	0	±0
Valencian Union (UV)	475	1.39	New	0	±0
Blank ballots	716	2.09	+0.73		
Total	34,218			25	±0
Valid votes	34,218	99.37	−0.06		
Invalid votes	218	0.63	+0.06		
Votes cast / turnout	34,436	67.72	−6.00		
Abstentions	16,417	32.28	+6.00		
Registered voters	50,853				
Sources
Footnotes: ^{1} Bloc–Nationalists of Alcoy–The Greens results are compared to Nationalists of Alcoy totals in the 1995 election.

=== Alicante ===
Population: 272,432

← Summary of the 13 June 1999 City Council of Alicante election results →
Parties and alliances	Popular vote			Seats	
Parties and alliances	Votes	%	±pp	Total	+/−
People's Party (PP)	64,479	49.09	+0.97	15	+1
Spanish Socialist Workers' Party (PSOE)	48,426	36.87	+0.70	11	+1
United Left of the Valencian Country (EUPV)	8,162	6.21	−5.33	1	−2
Bloc for Alicante–The Greens (BA–EV)	3,389	2.58	New	0	±0
Valencian Union (UV)	1,187	0.90	New	0	±0
The Ecologist–Pacifist Greens (LVEP)	1,151	0.88	New	0	±0
Communist Party of the Peoples of Spain (PCPE)	309	0.24	−0.01	0	±0
The Phalanx (FE)	308	0.23	New	0	±0
Alicantine Democratic Union (UniDA)	305	0.23	New	0	±0
Independent Initiative (II)	273	0.21	New	0	±0
Spanish Democratic Party (PADE)	160	0.12	New	0	±0
Humanist Party (PH)	135	0.10	New	0	±0
Alicantine Democratic Association (ADA)	18	0.01	New	0	±0
Blank ballots	3,034	2.31	+1.10		
Total	131,336			27	±0
Valid votes	131,336	99.40	±0.00		
Invalid votes	789	0.60	±0.00		
Votes cast / turnout	132,125	57.41	−12.82		
Abstentions	98,001	42.59	+12.82		
Registered voters	230,126				

=== Benidorm ===
Population: 50,946

← Summary of the 13 June 1999 City Council of Benidorm election results →
Parties and alliances	Popular vote			Seats	
Parties and alliances	Votes	%	±pp	Total	+/−
People's Party (PP)	11,329	48.55	−1.34	14	+2
Spanish Socialist Workers' Party (PSOE)	8,580	36.77	+4.61	11	+4
United Left of the Valencian Country (EUPV)	1,146	4.91	−4.64	0	−2
Valencian Nationalist Bloc (BNV)^{1}	861	3.69	+0.74	0	±0
Independent Initiative (II)	540	2.31	New	0	±0
The Greens of the Valencian Country (LV/EV)	246	1.05	New	0	±0
Valencian Union (UV)	209	0.90	−0.40	0	±0
Blank ballots	423	1.81	+0.33		
Total	23,334			25	+4
Valid votes	23,334	98.96	−0.43		
Invalid votes	246	1.04	+0.43		
Votes cast / turnout	23,580	58.28	−9.57		
Abstentions	16,879	41.72	+9.57		
Registered voters	40,459				
Sources
Footnotes: ^{1} Valencian Nationalist Bloc results are compared to Valencian People's Union–Nationalist Bloc totals in the 1995 election.

=== Castellón de la Plana ===
Population: 137,741

← Summary of the 13 June 1999 City Council of Castellón de la Plana election results →
Parties and alliances	Popular vote			Seats	
Parties and alliances	Votes	%	±pp	Total	+/−
People's Party (PP)	36,612	53.55	−0.32	16	±0
Spanish Socialist Workers' Party (PSOE)	21,596	31.59	+4.73	10	+2
Valencian Nationalist Bloc–The Greens (BNV–EV)^{1}	3,768	5.51	−0.18	1	±0
United Left of the Valencian Country (EUPV)	2,959	4.33	−4.86	0	−2
Valencian Union (UV)	1,371	2.01	+0.15	0	±0
Front for the Valencian Country (FPV)	515	0.75	New	0	±0
Humanist Party (PH)	142	0.21	New	0	±0
Blank ballots	1,403	2.05	+0.72		
Total	68,366			27	±0
Valid votes	68,366	99.25	−0.02		
Invalid votes	514	0.75	+0.02		
Votes cast / turnout	68,880	62.72	−6.01		
Abstentions	44,788	37.28	+6.01		
Registered voters	113,668				
Sources
Footnotes: ^{1} Valencian Nationalist Bloc–The Greens results are compared to Valencian People's Union–United Grao totals in the 1995 election.

=== Elche ===
Population: 191,713

← Summary of the 13 June 1999 City Council of Elche election results →
Parties and alliances	Popular vote			Seats	
Parties and alliances	Votes	%	±pp	Total	+/−
Spanish Socialist Workers' Party (PSOE)	46,430	48.12	+11.81	14	+3
People's Party (PP)	37,855	39.24	−5.08	12	−1
United Left of the Valencian Country (EUPV)	5,868	6.08	−6.34	1	−2
Valencian Nationalist Bloc–The Greens (BNV–EV)	1,704	1.77	+0.99	0	±0
Valencian Union (UV)	1,184	1.23	−0.36	0	±0
Neighbours for El Altet Independent Party (PIVA)	706	0.73	New	0	±0
Independent Party of Elche (PIDE)	470	0.49	New	0	±0
Humanist Party (PH)	370	0.38	New	0	±0
Independent Initiative (II)	228	0.24	New	0	±0
Communist Party of the Peoples of Spain (PCPE)	196	0.20	New	0	±0
The Phalanx (FE)	168	0.17	New	0	±0
Blank ballots	1,302	1.35	+0.25		
Total	96,481			27	±0
Valid votes	96,481	99.40	−0.09		
Invalid votes	586	0.60	+0.09		
Votes cast / turnout	97,067	63.20	−8.10		
Abstentions	56,511	36.80	+8.10		
Registered voters	153,578				
Sources
Footnotes: ^{1} Valencian Nationalist Bloc–The Greens results are compared to Valencian People's Union–Nationalist Bloc totals in the 1995 election.

=== Elda ===
Population: 52,490

← Summary of the 13 June 1999 City Council of Elda election results →
Parties and alliances	Popular vote			Seats	
Parties and alliances	Votes	%	±pp	Total	+/−
Spanish Socialist Workers' Party (PSOE)	12,991	47.07	+14.31	13	+4
People's Party (PP)	10,309	37.35	−9.75	10	−2
Union for Elda Progress (UPElda)	1,867	6.76	New	1	+1
United Left of the Valencian Country (EUPV)	1,571	5.69	−9.08	1	−3
Valencian Union (UV)	282	1.02	New	0	±0
Blank ballots	578	2.09	+0.71		
Total	27,598			25	±0
Valid votes	27,598	99.40	−0.08		
Invalid votes	167	0.60	+0.08		
Votes cast / turnout	27,765	63.10	−8.81		
Abstentions	16,239	36.90	+8.81		
Registered voters	44,004				

=== Gandia ===
Population: 57,518

← Summary of the 13 June 1999 City Council of Gandia election results →
Parties and alliances	Popular vote			Seats	
Parties and alliances	Votes	%	±pp	Total	+/−
Spanish Socialist Workers' Party (PSOE)	13,858	40.70	+3.43	12	+2
People's Party (PP)	13,345	39.19	+3.86	11	+2
Valencian Nationalist Bloc–The Greens (BNV–EV)^{1}	2,480	7.28	−2.09	2	±0
United Left of the Valencian Country (EUPV)	1,434	4.21	−3.21	0	−2
Valencian Union (UV)	1,403	4.12	−4.19	0	−2
Valencian Independent Group (GIVAL)	1,026	3.01	New	0	±0
Blank ballots	506	1.49	+0.24		
Total	34,052			25	±0
Valid votes	34,052	99.00	−0.49		
Invalid votes	345	1.00	+0.49		
Votes cast / turnout	34,397	69.71	−5.10		
Abstentions	14,949	30.29	+5.10		
Registered voters	49,346				
Sources
Footnotes: ^{1} Valencian Nationalist Bloc–The Greens results are compared to Valencian People's Union–Nationalist Bloc totals in the 1995 election.

=== Orihuela ===
Population: 50,581

← Summary of the 13 June 1999 City Council of Orihuela election results →
Parties and alliances	Popular vote			Seats	
Parties and alliances	Votes	%	±pp	Total	+/−
People's Party (PP)	14,316	50.66	−12.65	15	−2
Spanish Socialist Workers' Party (PSOE)	5,700	20.17	−6.16	5	−2
Liberal Centre (CL)	5,124	18.13	New	5	+5
United Left of the Valencian Country (EUPV)	1,387	4.91	−0.44	0	−1
Valencian Union (UV)	970	3.43	New	0	±0
Popular Unity of Independents (UPDI)	117	0.41	−0.33	0	±0
Communist Party of the Peoples of Spain (PCPE)	105	0.37	−0.17	0	±0
Blank ballots	538	1.90	+0.31		
Total	28,257			25	±0
Valid votes	28,257	98.80	−0.72		
Invalid votes	342	1.20	+0.72		
Votes cast / turnout	28,599	73.29	−2.75		
Abstentions	10,425	26.71	+2.75		
Registered voters	39,024				

=== Paterna ===
Population: 46,380

← Summary of the 13 June 1999 City Council of Paterna election results →
Parties and alliances	Popular vote			Seats	
Parties and alliances	Votes	%	±pp	Total	+/−
Spanish Socialist Workers' Party (PSOE)	8,591	38.19	+6.62	9	+2
People's Party (PP)	8,589	38.18	−1.46	9	±0
United Left of the Valencian Country (EUPV)	2,185	9.71	−10.02	2	−2
Valencian Union (UV)	1,696	7.54	+0.50	1	±0
Valencian Nationalist Bloc–The Greens (Bloc–EV)	989	4.40	New	0	±0
Blank ballots	445	1.98	+0.70		
Total	22,495			21	±0
Valid votes	22,495	98.96	−0.33		
Invalid votes	237	1.04	+0.33		
Votes cast / turnout	22,732	59.06	−11.42		
Abstentions	15,760	40.94	+11.42		
Registered voters	38,492				

=== Sagunto ===
Population: 56,607

← Summary of the 13 June 1999 City Council of Sagunto election results →
Parties and alliances	Popular vote			Seats	
Parties and alliances	Votes	%	±pp	Total	+/−
People's Party (PP)	7,472	26.46	+6.83	8	+3
Spanish Socialist Workers' Party (PSOE)	6,995	24.77	−2.70	7	−1
Portenian Segregation (SP)	4,369	15.47	New	4	+4
Valencian Union (UV)	3,130	11.09	+6.87	3	+3
Valencian Nationalist Bloc–The Greens (Bloc–EV)^{1}	2,637	9.34	+3.69	3	+2
Independent Candidacy for Sagunto (CIPS)	1,247	4.42	−13.21	0	−5
United Left of the Valencian Country (EUPV)	1,131	4.01	−12.94	0	−4
Humanist Party (PH)	47	0.17	New	0	±0
Democratic and Social Centre (CDS)	n/a	n/a	−7.68	0	−2
Blank ballots	1,207	4.27	+3.51		
Total	28,235			25	±0
Valid votes	28,235	99.03	−0.50		
Invalid votes	276	0.97	+0.50		
Votes cast / turnout	28,511	58.11	−11.92		
Abstentions	20,550	41.89	+11.92		
Registered voters	49,061				
Sources
Footnotes: ^{1} Valencian Nationalist Bloc–The Greens results are compared to Valencian People's Union–Nationalist Bloc totals in the 1995 election.

=== Torrent ===
Population: 62,562

← Summary of the 13 June 1999 City Council of Torrent election results →
Parties and alliances	Popular vote			Seats	
Parties and alliances	Votes	%	±pp	Total	+/−
Spanish Socialist Workers' Party (PSOE)	14,518	46.68	+3.84	13	+2
People's Party (PP)	11,051	35.53	−1.35	10	±0
Valencian Union (UV)	2,300	7.40	+0.01	2	±0
United Left of the Valencian Country (EUPV)	1,388	4.46	−5.28	0	−2
Bloc for Torrent–The Greens (Bloc–EV)^{1}	1,360	4.37	+3.19	0	±0
Blank ballots	484	1.56	+0.39		
Total	31,101			25	±0
Valid votes	31,101	99.33	−0.18		
Invalid votes	209	0.67	+0.18		
Votes cast / turnout	31,310	60.17	−10.03		
Abstentions	20,730	39.83	+10.03		
Registered voters	52,040				
Sources
Footnotes: ^{1} Bloc for Torrent–The Greens results are compared to Valencian People's Union–Nationalist Bloc totals in the 1995 election.

=== Torrevieja ===
Population: 38,336

← Summary of the 13 June 1999 City Council of Torrevieja election results →
Parties and alliances	Popular vote			Seats	
Parties and alliances	Votes	%	±pp	Total	+/−
People's Party (PP)	10,442	63.08	+8.61	14	+2
Spanish Socialist Workers' Party (PSOE)	4,743	28.65	+2.21	6	±0
United Left of the Valencian Country (EUPV)	998	6.03	−9.42	1	−2
Humanist Party (PH)	148	0.89	New	0	±0
Blank ballots	222	1.34	+0.39		
Total	16,553			21	±0
Valid votes	16,553	98.71	−0.51		
Invalid votes	217	1.29	+0.51		
Votes cast / turnout	16,770	58.66	−6.70		
Abstentions	11,818	41.34	+6.70		
Registered voters	28,588				

=== Valencia ===
Population: 739,412

== See also ==
- 1999 Valencian regional election
