= 1991 Spanish local elections in the Valencian Community =

This article presents the results breakdown of the local elections held in the Valencian Community on 26 May 1991. The following tables show detailed results in the autonomous community's most populous municipalities, sorted alphabetically.

== City control ==
The following table lists party control in the most populous municipalities, including provincial capitals (highlighted in bold). Gains for a party are highlighted in that party's colour.

Municipality	Population	Previous control	New control
Alcoy	65,082	Spanish Socialist Workers' Party (PSOE)	Spanish Socialist Workers' Party (PSOE)
**Alicante**	267,485	Spanish Socialist Workers' Party (PSOE)	Spanish Socialist Workers' Party (PSOE)
Benidorm	41,556	Spanish Socialist Workers' Party (PSOE)	Spanish Socialist Workers' Party (PSOE) (PP in 1991)
**Castellón de la Plana**	135,863	Spanish Socialist Workers' Party (PSOE)	People's Party (PP)
Elche	184,912	Spanish Socialist Workers' Party (PSOE)	Spanish Socialist Workers' Party (PSOE)
Elda	57,515	Spanish Socialist Workers' Party (PSOE)	Spanish Socialist Workers' Party (PSOE)
Gandia	54,778	Spanish Socialist Workers' Party (PSOE)	Spanish Socialist Workers' Party (PSOE)
Orihuela	46,471	People's Party (PP)	People's Party (PP)
Paterna	48,548	Spanish Socialist Workers' Party (PSOE)	Spanish Socialist Workers' Party (PSOE)
Sagunto	58,135	Independent Candidacy for Sagunto (CIPS)	Spanish Socialist Workers' Party (PSOE)
Torrent	57,137	Spanish Socialist Workers' Party (PSOE)	Spanish Socialist Workers' Party (PSOE)
Torrevieja	23,192	People's Party (PP)	People's Party (PP)
**Valencia**	758,738	Spanish Socialist Workers' Party (PSOE)	People's Party (PP)

== Municipalities ==
=== Alcoy ===
Population: 65,082

← Summary of the 26 May 1991 City Council of Alcoy election results →
Parties and alliances	Popular vote			Seats	
Parties and alliances	Votes	%	±pp	Total	+/−
Spanish Socialist Workers' Party (PSOE)	18,597	58.60	+8.16	16	+1
People's Party (PP)^{1}	6,752	21.28	−0.54	6	+1
United Left of the Valencian Country (EU)	3,358	10.58	+0.95	3	+1
Democratic and Social Centre (CDS)	1,522	4.80	−6.10	0	−3
Valencian Union (UV)	611	1.93	+0.39	0	±0
Nationalist Valencian Party (PVN)	380	1.20	New	0	±0
Left Platform (PCE (m–l)–CRPE)^{2}	125	0.39	+0.06	0	±0
Spanish Phalanx of the CNSO (FE–JONS)	121	0.38	New	0	±0
Blank ballots	269	0.85	−0.08		
Total	31,735			25	±0
Valid votes	31,735	99.55	+0.74		
Invalid votes	144	0.45	−0.74		
Votes cast / turnout	31,879	65.18	−4.74		
Abstentions	17,028	34.82	+4.74		
Registered voters	48,907				
Sources
Footnotes: ^{1} People's Party results are compared to the combined totals of People's Alliance and People's Democratic Party–Valencian Centrists in the 1987 election.; ^{2} Left Platform results are compared to Republican Popular Unity totals in the 1987 election.

=== Alicante ===
Population: 267,485

← Summary of the 26 May 1991 City Council of Alicante election results →
Parties and alliances	Popular vote			Seats	
Parties and alliances	Votes	%	±pp	Total	+/−
Spanish Socialist Workers' Party (PSOE)	43,079	38.25	−2.53	12	±0
People's Party (PP)^{1}	40,022	35.54	+7.03	12	+4
United Left of the Valencian Country (EU)^{2}	9,545	8.48	n/a	2	+1
Civic Solidarity of Alicante (SCAL)	6,655	5.91	New	1	+1
Democratic and Social Centre (CDS)	4,006	3.56	−13.77	0	−5
The Greens (LV)	1,943	1.73	−1.03	0	±0
The Greens of Alicante–Green Union (LVA–UVE)	1,679	1.49	New	0	±0
Alicantine Democratic Union (UniDA)	1,600	1.42	New	0	±0
Cantonalist Party of the Alicantine Country (Alicantón)	1,019	0.90	New	0	±0
Valencian People's Union (UPV)^{2}	714	0.63	n/a	0	−1
Valencian Union (UV)	665	0.59	New	0	±0
Independent Alicantine National Party (PNAI)	261	0.23	New	0	±0
Spanish Phalanx of the CNSO (FE–JONS)	252	0.22	−0.20	0	±0
Blank ballots	1,171	1.04	+0.10		
Total	112,611			27	±0
Valid votes	112,611	99.62	+1.43		
Invalid votes	432	0.38	−1.43		
Votes cast / turnout	113,043	56.13	−10.17		
Abstentions	88,348	43.87	+10.17		
Registered voters	201,391				
Sources
Footnotes: ^{1} People's Party results are compared to the combined totals of People's Alliance and People's Democratic Party–Valencian Centrists in the 1987 election.; ^{2} Within the United Left–Valencian People's Union alliance in the 1987 election.

=== Benidorm ===
Population: 41,556

← Summary of the 26 May 1991 City Council of Benidorm election results →
Parties and alliances	Popular vote			Seats	
Parties and alliances	Votes	%	±pp	Total	+/−
Spanish Socialist Workers' Party (PSOE)	7,433	41.52	−1.30	11	+1
People's Party (PP)^{1}	7,025	39.24	+0.28	10	+1
United Left of the Valencian Country (EU)^{2}	871	4.87	n/a	0	±0
Independent Socialist Party (PSI)	642	3.59	−1.45	0	−1
Valencian People's Union (UPV)^{2}	632	3.53	n/a	0	±0
Democratic and Social Centre (CDS)	333	1.86	−3.30	0	−1
The Greens (LV)	310	1.73	New	0	±0
Coalition for Benidorm–Centrists–Green Union (CUV)	281	1.57	New	0	±0
Valencian Union (UV)	177	0.99	New	0	±0
Blank ballots	197	1.10	+0.47		
Total	17,901			21	±0
Valid votes	17,901	99.54	+0.64		
Invalid votes	83	0.46	−0.64		
Votes cast / turnout	17,984	61.80	−5.85		
Abstentions	11,118	38.20	+5.85		
Registered voters	29,102				
Sources
Footnotes: ^{1} People's Party results are compared to the combined totals of People's Democratic Party–Valencian Centrists and People's Alliance in the 1987 election.; ^{2} Within the United Left–Valencian People's Union alliance in the 1987 election.

=== Castellón de la Plana ===
Population: 135,863

← Summary of the 26 May 1991 City Council of Castellón de la Plana election results →
Parties and alliances	Popular vote			Seats	
Parties and alliances	Votes	%	±pp	Total	+/−
People's Party (PP)^{1}	23,325	38.35	+5.98	14	+5
Spanish Socialist Workers' Party (PSOE)	21,814	35.87	−3.76	13	+1
Valencian People's Union (UPV)^{2}	2,995	4.92	n/a	0	−1
United Left of the Valencian Country (EU)^{2}	2,659	4.37	n/a	0	±0
Democratic and Social Centre (CDS)	2,137	3.51	−13.20	0	−5
Valencian Union (UV)	1,810	2.98	+2.03	0	±0
United Grao (GU)	1,757	2.89	New	0	±0
The Greens (LV)	1,719	2.83	+2.83	0	±0
Socialist Democracy (DS)	1,666	2.74	New	0	±0
Left Alternative of Castellón (EAC)	172	0.28	New	0	±0
Blank ballots	765	1.26	−0.01		
Total	60,819			27	±0
Valid votes	60,819	99.46	+0.88		
Invalid votes	332	0.54	−0.88		
Votes cast / turnout	61,151	60.33	−7.44		
Abstentions	40,217	39.67	+7.44		
Registered voters	101,368				
Sources
Footnotes: ^{1} People's Party results are compared to the combined totals of People's Alliance and People's Democratic Party–Valencian Centrists in the 1987 election.; ^{2} Within the United Left–Valencian People's Union alliance in the 1987 election.

=== Elche ===
Population: 184,912

← Summary of the 26 May 1991 City Council of Elche election results →
Parties and alliances	Popular vote			Seats	
Parties and alliances	Votes	%	±pp	Total	+/−
Spanish Socialist Workers' Party (PSOE)	43,179	53.69	+8.44	16	+2
People's Party (PP)^{1}	22,610	28.11	+5.46	8	+3
United Left of the Valencian Country (EU)	5,941	7.39	−0.32	2	±0
Democratic and Social Centre (CDS)	4,600	5.72	−12.92	1	−5
Valencian Union (UV)	1,232	1.53	New	0	±0
Valencian People's Union (UPV)	1,001	1.24	−0.03	0	±0
Communist Party of the Peoples of Spain (PCPE)	791	0.98	New	0	±0
Blank ballots	1,068	1.33	+0.53		
Total	80,422			27	±0
Valid votes	80,422	99.38	+0.09		
Invalid votes	502	0.62	−0.09		
Votes cast / turnout	80,924	61.45	−6.88		
Abstentions	50,768	38.55	+6.88		
Registered voters	131,692				
Sources
Footnotes: ^{1} People's Party results are compared to the combined totals of People's Alliance and People's Democratic Party–Valencian Centrists in the 1987 election.

=== Elda ===
Population: 57,515

← Summary of the 26 May 1991 City Council of Elda election results →
Parties and alliances	Popular vote			Seats	
Parties and alliances	Votes	%	±pp	Total	+/−
Spanish Socialist Workers' Party (PSOE)	11,319	41.66	−3.51	11	−1
People's Party (PP)^{1}	6,884	25.34	+1.87	6	±0
Democratic and Social Centre (CDS)	6,199	22.82	+2.14	6	+1
United Left of the Valencian Country (EU)^{2}	2,140	7.88	n/a	2	+1
Valencian Union (UV)	241	0.89	New	0	±0
Valencian People's Union (UPV)^{2}	95	0.35	n/a	0	−1
Blank ballots	289	1.06	+0.04		
Total	27,167			25	±0
Valid votes	27,167	99.53	+0.77		
Invalid votes	129	0.47	−0.77		
Votes cast / turnout	27,296	64.86	−3.49		
Abstentions	14,790	35.14	+3.49		
Registered voters	42,086				
Sources
Footnotes: ^{1} People's Party results are compared to People's Alliance totals in the 1987 election.; ^{2} Within the United Left–Valencian People's Union alliance in the 1987 election.

=== Gandia ===
Population: 54,778

← Summary of the 26 May 1991 City Council of Gandia election results →
Parties and alliances	Popular vote			Seats	
Parties and alliances	Votes	%	±pp	Total	+/−
Spanish Socialist Workers' Party (PSOE)	10,882	37.71	+4.25	11	+1
People's Party (PP)^{1}	7,288	25.25	+0.34	7	+1
Valencian Union (UV)	4,009	13.89	+7.26	4	+2
Valencian People's Union (UPV)	3,733	12.93	+0.20	3	±0
United Left of the Valencian Country (EU)	1,274	4.41	+1.66	0	±0
Democratic and Social Centre (CDS)	933	3.23	−4.85	0	−2
Valencian Independent Organization (OIV)	360	1.25	−6.07	0	−2
Blank ballots	381	1.32	+0.53		
Total	28,860			25	±0
Valid votes	28,860	99.39	+0.28		
Invalid votes	178	0.61	−0.28		
Votes cast / turnout	29,038	70.95	−4.10		
Abstentions	11,887	29.05	+4.10		
Registered voters	40,925				
Sources
Footnotes: ^{1} People's Party results are compared to the combined totals of People's Alliance and People's Democratic Party–Valencian Centrists in the 1987 election.

=== Orihuela ===
Population: 46,471

← Summary of the 26 May 1991 City Council of Orihuela election results →
Parties and alliances	Popular vote			Seats	
Parties and alliances	Votes	%	±pp	Total	+/−
People's Party (PP)^{1}	14,289	57.63	−8.45	14	−1
Spanish Socialist Workers' Party (PSOE)	6,376	25.71	+5.58	6	+2
Democratic and Social Centre (CDS)	1,919	7.74	−0.38	1	±0
Orihuela Democratic Unity (UDO)	1,148	4.63	New	0	±0
United Left of the Valencian Country (EU)^{2}	729	2.94	n/a	0	−1
Left Platform (PCE (m–l)–CRPE)	159	0.64	New	0	±0
Blank ballots	175	0.71	+0.25		
Total	24,795			21	±0
Valid votes	24,795	99.60	+0.03		
Invalid votes	100	0.40	−0.03		
Votes cast / turnout	24,895	73.37	−1.42		
Abstentions	9,036	26.63	+1.42		
Registered voters	33,931				
Sources
Footnotes: ^{1} People's Party results are compared to the combined totals of People's Alliance, Liberal Party and People's Democratic Party–Valencian Centrists in the 1987 election.; ^{2} Within the United Left–Valencian People's Union alliance in the 1987 election.

=== Paterna ===
Population: 48,548

← Summary of the 26 May 1991 City Council of Paterna election results →
Parties and alliances	Popular vote			Seats	
Parties and alliances	Votes	%	±pp	Total	+/−
Spanish Socialist Workers' Party (PSOE)	7,499	45.11	+2.42	11	±0
People's Party (PP)^{1}	3,757	22.60	+8.11	5	+2
United Left of the Valencian Country (EU)^{2}	2,001	12.04	n/a	3	+1
Valencian Union (UV)	1,995	12.00	+3.16	2	±0
Paterna Green Left (EVP)	768	4.62	New	0	±0
Democratic and Social Centre (CDS)	403	2.42	−11.49	0	−3
Blank ballots	199	1.20	+0.21		
Total	16,622			21	±0
Valid votes	16,622	99.27	+1.00		
Invalid votes	122	0.73	−1.00		
Votes cast / turnout	16,744	57.39	−11.60		
Abstentions	12,434	42.61	+11.60		
Registered voters	29,178				
Sources
Footnotes: ^{1} People's Party results are compared to People's Alliance totals in the 1987 election.; ^{2} Within the United Left–Valencian People's Union alliance in the 1987 election.

=== Sagunto ===
Population: 58,135

← Summary of the 26 May 1991 City Council of Sagunto election results →
Parties and alliances	Popular vote			Seats	
Parties and alliances	Votes	%	±pp	Total	+/−
Spanish Socialist Workers' Party (PSOE)	10,074	37.00	+8.54	11	+3
Independent Candidacy for Sagunto (CIPS)	7,413	27.22	+1.03	8	+1
United Left of the Valencian Country (EU)	2,717	9.98	+1.53	3	+1
People's Party (PP)^{1}	2,354	8.64	+2.42	2	+1
Democratic and Social Centre (CDS)	1,528	5.61	−14.27	1	−5
Valencian People's Union (UPV)	1,272	4.67	−0.41	0	−1
Valencian Union (UV)	1,170	4.30	+2.68	0	±0
Valencian Independent Organization (OIV)	519	1.91	New	0	±0
Blank ballots	183	0.67	−0.20		
Total	27,230			25	±0
Valid votes	27,230	99.49	+1.05		
Invalid votes	140	0.51	−1.05		
Votes cast / turnout	27,370	61.98	−4.62		
Abstentions	16,787	38.02	+4.62		
Registered voters	44,157				
Sources
Footnotes: ^{1} People's Party results are compared to People's Alliance totals in the 1987 election.

=== Torrent ===
Population: 57,137

← Summary of the 26 May 1991 City Council of Torrent election results →
Parties and alliances	Popular vote			Seats	
Parties and alliances	Votes	%	±pp	Total	+/−
Spanish Socialist Workers' Party (PSOE)	14,912	58.05	+12.86	16	+3
People's Party (PP)^{1}	5,653	22.01	−6.92	6	−2
Valencian Union (UV)	2,619	10.20	+1.91	2	±0
United Left of the Valencian Country (EU)	1,317	5.13	+0.42	1	+1
Democratic and Social Centre (CDS)	379	1.48	−5.24	0	−2
Valencian Radical Socialist Party (PRSV)	304	1.18	New	0	±0
Valencian People's Union (UPV)	295	1.15	−0.91	0	±0
Blank ballots	207	0.81	−0.12		
Total	25,686			25	±0
Valid votes	25,686	99.37	+0.87		
Invalid votes	164	0.63	−0.87		
Votes cast / turnout	25,850	62.06	−9.44		
Abstentions	15,806	37.94	+9.44		
Registered voters	41,656				
Sources
Footnotes: ^{1} People's Party results are compared to the combined totals of People's Alliance and People's Democratic Party–Valencian Centrists in the 1987 election.

=== Torrevieja ===
Population: 23,192

← Summary of the 26 May 1991 City Council of Torrevieja election results →
Parties and alliances	Popular vote			Seats	
Parties and alliances	Votes	%	±pp	Total	+/−
People's Party (PP)^{1}	5,194	55.25	+27.38	13	+8
Spanish Socialist Workers' Party (PSOE)	2,949	31.37	+0.19	7	+1
United Left of the Valencian Country (EU)^{2}	787	8.37	n/a	1	+1
Democratic and Social Centre (CDS)	410	4.36	−1.07	0	−1
Torrevieja United Candidacy (CUT)	n/a	n/a	−18.85	0	−4
Independent Progressives (PI)	n/a	n/a	−8.94	0	−1
Blank ballots	61	0.65	+0.07		
Total	9,401			21	+4
Valid votes	9,401	99.51	+0.29		
Invalid votes	46	0.49	−0.29		
Votes cast / turnout	9,447	67.26	−6.85		
Abstentions	4,598	32.74	+6.85		
Registered voters	14,045				
Sources
Footnotes: ^{1} People's Party results are compared to the combined totals of People's Alliance and People's Democratic Party–Valencian Centrists in the 1987 election.; ^{2} Within the United Left–Valencian People's Union alliance in the 1987 election.

=== Valencia ===
Population: 758,738

== See also ==
- 1991 Valencian regional election
