= 1987 Spanish local elections in the Valencian Community =

This article presents the results breakdown of the local elections held in the Valencian Community on 10 June 1987. The following tables show detailed results in the autonomous community's most populous municipalities, sorted alphabetically.

== City control ==
The following table lists party control in the most populous municipalities, including provincial capitals (highlighted in bold). Gains for a party are highlighted in that party's colour.

Municipality	Population	Previous control	New control
Alcoy	66,244	Spanish Socialist Workers' Party (PSOE)	Spanish Socialist Workers' Party (PSOE)
**Alicante**	258,112	Spanish Socialist Workers' Party (PSOE)	Spanish Socialist Workers' Party (PSOE)
Benidorm	33,842	Spanish Socialist Workers' Party (PSOE)	Spanish Socialist Workers' Party (PSOE)
**Castellón de la Plana**	127,440	Spanish Socialist Workers' Party (PSOE)	Spanish Socialist Workers' Party (PSOE)
Elche	175,649	Spanish Socialist Workers' Party (PSOE)	Spanish Socialist Workers' Party (PSOE)
Elda	55,994	Spanish Socialist Workers' Party (PSOE)	Spanish Socialist Workers' Party (PSOE)
Gandia	51,028	Spanish Socialist Workers' Party (PSOE)	Spanish Socialist Workers' Party (PSOE)
Orihuela	45,545	People's Alliance (AP)	People's Alliance (AP)
Paterna	34,373	Spanish Socialist Workers' Party (PSOE)	Spanish Socialist Workers' Party (PSOE)
Sagunto	55,862	Spanish Socialist Workers' Party (PSOE)	Independent Candidacy for Sagunto (CIPS)
Torrent	54,544	Spanish Socialist Workers' Party (PSOE)	Spanish Socialist Workers' Party (PSOE)
Torrevieja	17,169	Spanish Socialist Workers' Party (PSOE)	Spanish Socialist Workers' Party (PSOE) (AP in 1988)
**Valencia**	729,419	Spanish Socialist Workers' Party (PSOE)	Spanish Socialist Workers' Party (PSOE)

== Municipalities ==
=== Alcoy ===
Population: 66,244

← Summary of the 10 June 1987 City Council of Alcoy election results →
Parties and alliances	Popular vote			Seats	
Parties and alliances	Votes	%	±pp	Total	+/−
Spanish Socialist Workers' Party (PSOE)	16,765	50.44	−15.79	15	−3
People's Alliance (AP)^{1}	6,404	19.27	n/a	5	±0
Democratic and Social Centre (CDS)	3,624	10.90	+9.83	3	+3
United Left (IU)^{2}	3,202	9.63	+3.30	2	+1
Valencian People's Union (UPV)	975	2.93	New	0	±0
People's Democratic Party–Valencian Centrists (PDP–CV)^{1}	849	2.55	n/a	0	±0
Valencian Union (UV)^{1}	512	1.54	n/a	0	−1
Workers' Party of Spain–Communist Unity (PTE–UC)	361	1.09	New	0	±0
Humanist Platform (PH)	127	0.38	New	0	±0
Republican Popular Unity (UPR)	111	0.33	New	0	±0
Blank ballots	308	0.93	+0.93		
Total	33,238			25	±0
Valid votes	33,238	98.81	−1.19		
Invalid votes	401	1.19	+1.19		
Votes cast / turnout	33,639	69.92	+2.05		
Abstentions	14,470	30.08	−2.05		
Registered voters	48,109				
Sources
Footnotes: ^{1} Within the People's Coalition–Valencian Union alliance in the 1983 election.; ^{2} United Left results are compared to Communist Party of the Valencian Country totals in the 1983 election.

=== Alicante ===
Population: 258,112

← Summary of the 10 June 1987 City Council of Alicante election results →
Parties and alliances	Popular vote			Seats	
Parties and alliances	Votes	%	±pp	Total	+/−
Spanish Socialist Workers' Party (PSOE)	49,396	40.78	−20.90	12	−7
People's Alliance (AP)^{1}	33,511	27.67	n/a	8	±0
Democratic and Social Centre (CDS)	20,985	17.33	+15.19	5	+5
United Left–Valencian People's Union (IU–UPV)^{2}	7,903	6.52	+1.57	2	+2
The Greens (LV)	3,339	2.76	New	0	±0
Workers' Party of Spain–Communist Unity (PTE–UC)	1,739	1.44	New	0	±0
People's Democratic Party–Valencian Centrists (PDP–CV)^{1}	1,018	0.84	n/a	0	±0
Valencian Electoral Coalition (CEV)	832	0.69	New	0	±0
Spanish Phalanx of the CNSO (FE–JONS)	508	0.42	New	0	±0
Independent Solution (SI)	329	0.27	New	0	±0
Republican Popular Unity (UPR)	241	0.20	New	0	±0
Humanist Platform (PH)	181	0.15	New	0	±0
Blank ballots	1,138	0.94	+0.94		
Total	121,120			27	±0
Valid votes	121,120	98.19	−1.81		
Invalid votes	2,235	1.81	+1.81		
Votes cast / turnout	123,355	66.30	+0.92		
Abstentions	62,692	33.70	−0.92		
Registered voters	186,047				
Sources
Footnotes: ^{1} Within the People's Coalition–Valencian Union alliance in the 1983 election.; ^{2} United Left–Valencian People's Union results are compared to Communist Party of the Valencian Country totals in the 1983 election.

=== Benidorm ===
Population: 33,842

← Summary of the 10 June 1987 City Council of Benidorm election results →
Parties and alliances	Popular vote			Seats	
Parties and alliances	Votes	%	±pp	Total	+/−
Spanish Socialist Workers' Party (PSOE)	6,528	42.82	−5.93	10	−2
People's Democratic Party–Valencian Centrists (PDP–CV)^{1}	4,464	29.28	n/a	7	+7
People's Alliance (AP)^{1}	1,476	9.68	n/a	2	−4
Democratic and Social Centre (CDS)	786	5.16	+2.94	1	+1
Independent Socialist Party (PSI)	768	5.04	New	1	+1
United Left–Valencian People's Union (IU–UPV)^{2}	628	4.12	−8.01	0	−2
The Greens (LV)	341	2.24	New	0	±0
Workers' Party of Spain–Communist Unity (PTE–UC)	159	1.04	New	0	±0
Benidorm Independent Group (AIB)	n/a	n/a	−7.45	0	−1
Blank ballots	96	0.63	+0.63		
Total	15,246			21	±0
Valid votes	15,246	98.90	−1.10		
Invalid votes	170	1.10	+1.10		
Votes cast / turnout	15,416	67.65	+6.75		
Abstentions	7,373	32.35	−6.75		
Registered voters	22,789				
Sources
Footnotes: ^{1} Within the People's Coalition–Valencian Union alliance in the 1983 election.; ^{2} United Left–Valencian People's Union results are compared to the combined totals of Valencian People's Union and Communist Party of the Valencian Country totals in the 1983 election.

=== Castellón de la Plana ===
Population: 127,440

← Summary of the 10 June 1987 City Council of Castellón de la Plana election results →
Parties and alliances	Popular vote			Seats	
Parties and alliances	Votes	%	±pp	Total	+/−
Spanish Socialist Workers' Party (PSOE)	24,695	39.63	−23.89	12	−7
People's Alliance (AP)^{1}	19,049	30.57	n/a	9	+2
Democratic and Social Centre (CDS)	10,412	16.71	+15.21	5	+5
United Left–Valencian People's Union (IU–UPV)^{2}	3,893	6.25	+0.69	1	+1
People's Democratic Party–Valencian Centrists (PDP–CV)^{1}	1,119	1.80	n/a	0	±0
Workers' Party of Spain–Communist Unity (PTE–UC)	659	1.06	New	0	±0
Valencian Union (UV)^{1}	592	0.95	n/a	0	−1
Liberal Party (PL)^{1}	465	0.75	n/a	0	±0
Valencian Electoral Coalition (CEV)	340	0.55	New	0	±0
Humanist Platform (PH)	291	0.47	New	0	±0
The Greens (LV)	2	0.00	New	0	±0
Blank ballots	792	1.27	+1.27		
Total	62,309			27	±0
Valid votes	62,309	98.58	−1.42		
Invalid votes	897	1.42	+1.42		
Votes cast / turnout	63,206	67.77	−0.22		
Abstentions	30,063	32.23	+0.22		
Registered voters	93,269				
Sources
Footnotes: ^{1} Within the People's Coalition–Valencian Union alliance in the 1983 election.; ^{2} United Left–Valencian People's Union results are compared to the combined totals of Valencian People's Union and Communist Party of the Valencian Country totals in the 1983 election.

=== Elche ===
Population: 175,649

← Summary of the 10 June 1987 City Council of Elche election results →
Parties and alliances	Popular vote			Seats	
Parties and alliances	Votes	%	±pp	Total	+/−
Spanish Socialist Workers' Party (PSOE)	36,877	45.25	−12.43	14	−3
Democratic and Social Centre (CDS)	15,189	18.64	+16.30	6	+6
People's Alliance (AP)^{1}	15,145	18.58	n/a	5	−3
United Left (IU)^{2}	6,282	7.71	−0.43	2	±0
People's Democratic Party–Valencian Centrists (PDP–CV)^{1}	3,320	4.07	n/a	0	±0
Workers' Party of Spain–Communist Unity (PTE–UC)	1,689	2.07	New	0	±0
Valencian People's Union (UPV)	1,036	1.27	New	0	±0
Independent Group of Elche (AIE)	681	0.84	New	0	±0
Humanist Platform (PH)	626	0.77	New	0	±0
Blank ballots	650	0.80	+0.80		
Total	81,495			27	±0
Valid votes	81,495	99.29	−0.71		
Invalid votes	580	0.71	+0.71		
Votes cast / turnout	82,075	68.33	+5.80		
Abstentions	38,043	31.67	−5.80		
Registered voters	120,118				
Sources
Footnotes: ^{1} Within the People's Coalition–Valencian Union alliance in the 1983 election.; ^{2} United Left results are compared to Communist Party of the Valencian Country totals in the 1983 election.

=== Elda ===
Population: 55,994

← Summary of the 10 June 1987 City Council of Elda election results →
Parties and alliances	Popular vote			Seats	
Parties and alliances	Votes	%	±pp	Total	+/−
Spanish Socialist Workers' Party (PSOE)	12,072	45.17	−18.75	12	−5
People's Alliance (AP)^{1}	6,271	23.47	−0.76	6	±0
Democratic and Social Centre (CDS)	5,527	20.68	New	5	+5
United Left–Valencian People's Union (IU–UPV)^{2}	2,038	7.63	+0.92	2	+1
Workers' Party of Spain–Communist Unity (PTE–UC)	400	1.50	New	0	±0
Humanist Platform (PH)	143	0.54	New	0	±0
Independent Candidacy of Elda (CIE)	n/a	n/a	−5.14	0	−1
Blank ballots	272	1.02	+1.02		
Total	26,723			25	±0
Valid votes	26,723	98.76	−1.24		
Invalid votes	335	1.24	+1.24		
Votes cast / turnout	27,058	68.35	−3.44		
Abstentions	12,530	31.65	+3.44		
Registered voters	39,588				
Sources
Footnotes: ^{1} People's Alliance results are compared to People's Coalition–Valencian Union totals in the 1983 election.; ^{2} United Left–Valencian People's Union results are compared to Communist Party of the Valencian Country totals in the 1983 election.

=== Gandia ===
Population: 51,028

← Summary of the 10 June 1987 City Council of Gandia election results →
Parties and alliances	Popular vote			Seats	
Parties and alliances	Votes	%	±pp	Total	+/−
Spanish Socialist Workers' Party (PSOE)	9,136	33.46	−4.43	10	+1
People's Alliance (AP)^{1}	6,135	22.47	n/a	6	+2
Valencian People's Union (UPV)	3,475	12.73	+0.68	3	±0
Democratic and Social Centre (CDS)	2,205	8.08	+4.43	2	+2
Valencian Independent Organization (OIV)	2,000	7.32	New	2	+2
Valencian Union (UV)^{1}	1,811	6.63	n/a	2	+1
United Left (IU)^{2}	752	2.75	−4.36	0	−1
People's Democratic Party–Valencian Centrists (PDP–CV)^{1}	665	2.44	n/a	0	−1
Workers' Party of Spain–Communist Unity (PTE–UC)	512	1.88	New	0	±0
Valencian Electoral Coalition (CEV)	189	0.69	New	0	±0
Left Front (FI)	147	0.54	New	0	±0
Humanist Platform (PH)	62	0.23	New	0	±0
Independent Group (AI)	n/a	n/a	−11.49	0	−2
Blank ballots	217	0.79	+0.79		
Total	27,306			25	+4
Valid votes	27,306	99.11	−0.89		
Invalid votes	244	0.89	+0.89		
Votes cast / turnout	27,550	75.05	+5.25		
Abstentions	9,159	24.95	−5.25		
Registered voters	36,709				
Sources
Footnotes: ^{1} Within the People's Coalition–Valencian Union alliance in the 1983 election.; ^{2} United Left results are compared to the combined totals of Communist Party of the Valencian Country and Socialist Action Party in the 1983 election.

=== Orihuela ===
Population: 45,545

← Summary of the 10 June 1987 City Council of Orihuela election results →
Parties and alliances	Popular vote			Seats	
Parties and alliances	Votes	%	±pp	Total	+/−
People's Alliance (AP)^{1}	15,305	62.89	n/a	15	+6
Spanish Socialist Workers' Party (PSOE)	4,899	20.13	−10.24	4	−5
Democratic and Social Centre (CDS)	1,976	8.12	−16.50	1	−6
United Left–Valencian People's Union (IU–UPV)^{2}	1,232	5.06	+0.96	1	+1
Liberal Party (PL)^{1}	572	2.35	n/a	0	±0
People's Democratic Party–Valencian Centrists (PDP–CV)^{1}	204	0.84	n/a	0	±0
Humanist Platform (PH)	36	0.15	New	0	±0
Blank ballots	112	0.46	+0.46		
Total	24,336			21	−4
Valid votes	24,336	99.57	−0.43		
Invalid votes	105	0.43	+0.43		
Votes cast / turnout	24,441	74.79	+8.75		
Abstentions	8,237	25.21	−8.75		
Registered voters	32,678				
Sources
Footnotes: ^{1} Within the People's Coalition–Valencian Union alliance in the 1983 election.; ^{2} United Left–Valencian People's Union results are compared to Communist Party of the Valencian Country totals in the 1983 election.

=== Paterna ===
Population: 34,373

← Summary of the 10 June 1987 City Council of Paterna election results →
Parties and alliances	Popular vote			Seats	
Parties and alliances	Votes	%	±pp	Total	+/−
Spanish Socialist Workers' Party (PSOE)	6,978	42.69	−15.57	11	−3
People's Alliance (AP)^{1}	2,368	14.49	n/a	3	−1
Democratic and Social Centre (CDS)	2,274	13.91	New	3	+3
United Left–Valencian People's Union (IU–UPV)^{2}	1,741	10.65	−3.38	2	±0
Valencian Union (UV)^{1}	1,445	8.84	n/a	2	+2
Communist Movement–Left Front (MCPV–FI)	771	4.72	New	0	±0
Workers' Party of Spain–Communist Unity (PTE–UC)	497	3.04	New	0	±0
Humanist Platform (PH)	108	0.66	New	0	±0
People's Democratic Party (PDP)^{1}	n/a	n/a	n/a	0	−1
Blank ballots	162	0.99	+0.99		
Total	16,344			21	±0
Valid votes	16,344	98.27	−1.73		
Invalid votes	288	1.73	+1.73		
Votes cast / turnout	16,632	68.99	+0.81		
Abstentions	7,476	31.01	−0.81		
Registered voters	24,108				
Sources
Footnotes: ^{1} Within the People's Coalition–Valencian Union alliance in the 1983 election.; ^{2} United Left results are compared to the combined totals of Communist Party of the Valencian Country and Socialist Action Party in the 1983 election.

=== Sagunto ===
Population: 55,862

← Summary of the 10 June 1987 City Council of Sagunto election results →
Parties and alliances	Popular vote			Seats	
Parties and alliances	Votes	%	±pp	Total	+/−
Spanish Socialist Workers' Party (PSOE)	7,777	28.46	−12.54	8	−3
Independent Candidacy for Sagunto (CIPS)	7,157	26.19	New	7	+7
Democratic and Social Centre (CDS)	5,431	19.88	New	6	+6
United Left (IU)^{1}	2,309	8.45	−11.29	2	−3
People's Alliance (AP)^{2}	1,699	6.22	n/a	1	−3
Valencian People's Union (UPV)	1,387	5.08	−0.47	1	±0
Workers' Party of Spain–Communist Unity (PTE–UC)	744	2.72	New	0	±0
Valencian Union (UV)^{2}	442	1.62	n/a	0	±0
Humanist Platform (PH)	85	0.31	New	0	±0
Republican Popular Unity (UPR)	55	0.20	New	0	±0
Left Independent Electors' Group of Sagunto (IIS)	n/a	n/a	−10.69	0	−2
Valencian Independent Organization (OIV)	n/a	n/a	−7.70	0	−2
Blank ballots	237	0.87	+0.87		
Total	27,323			25	±0
Valid votes	27,323	98.44	−1.56		
Invalid votes	432	1.56	+1.56		
Votes cast / turnout	27,755	66.60	+3.07		
Abstentions	13,918	33.40	−3.07		
Registered voters	41,673				
Sources
Footnotes: ^{1} United Left results are compared to Communist Party of the Valencian Country totals in the 1983 election.; ^{2} Within the People's Coalition–Valencian Union alliance in the 1983 election.

=== Torrent ===
Population: 54,544

← Summary of the 10 June 1987 City Council of Torrent election results →
Parties and alliances	Popular vote			Seats	
Parties and alliances	Votes	%	±pp	Total	+/−
Spanish Socialist Workers' Party (PSOE)	12,098	45.19	−13.68	13	−2
People's Alliance (AP)^{1}	6,933	25.89	n/a	8	+3
Valencian Union (UV)^{1}	2,219	8.29	n/a	2	+1
Democratic and Social Centre (CDS)	1,798	6.72	New	2	+2
United Left (IU)^{2}	1,260	4.71	−2.85	0	−2
People's Democratic Party–Valencian Centrists (PDP–CV)^{1}	813	3.04	n/a	0	−2
Valencian People's Union (UPV)	551	2.06	−0.29	0	±0
Workers' Party of Spain–Communist Unity (PTE–UC)	486	1.82	New	0	±0
Valencian Independent Organization (OIV)	301	1.12	New	0	±0
Humanist Platform (PH)	67	0.25	New	0	±0
Blank ballots	248	0.93	+0.93		
Total	26,774			25	±0
Valid votes	26,774	98.50	−1.50		
Invalid votes	409	1.50	+1.50		
Votes cast / turnout	27,183	71.50	+1.55		
Abstentions	10,836	28.50	−1.55		
Registered voters	38,019				
Sources
Footnotes: ^{1} Within the People's Coalition–Valencian Union alliance in the 1983 election.; ^{2} United Left results are compared to Communist Party of the Valencian Country totals in the 1983 election.

=== Torrevieja ===
Population: 17,169

← Summary of the 10 June 1987 City Council of Torrevieja election results →
Parties and alliances	Popular vote			Seats	
Parties and alliances	Votes	%	±pp	Total	+/−
Spanish Socialist Workers' Party (PSOE)	2,460	31.18	−34.72	6	−6
People's Alliance (AP)^{1}	1,828	23.17	n/a	5	+1
Torrevieja United Candidacy (CUT)	1,487	18.85	New	4	+4
Independent Progressives (PI)	705	8.94	New	1	+1
Democratic and Social Centre (CDS)	428	5.43	New	1	+1
People's Democratic Party–Valencian Centrists (PDP–CV)^{1}	371	4.70	n/a	0	±0
Torrevieja Independent Group (GIT)	271	3.44	New	0	±0
United Left–Valencian People's Union (IU–UPV)^{2}	182	2.31	−7.18	0	−1
Workers' Party of Spain–Communist Unity (PTE–UC)	72	0.91	New	0	±0
Independent Solution (SI)	39	0.49	New	0	±0
Blank ballots	46	0.58	+0.58		
Total	7,889			17	±0
Valid votes	7,889	99.22	−0.78		
Invalid votes	62	0.78	+0.78		
Votes cast / turnout	7,951	74.11	+5.95		
Abstentions	2,777	25.89	−5.95		
Registered voters	10,728				
Sources
Footnotes: ^{1} Within the People's Coalition–Valencian Union alliance in the 1983 election.; ^{2} United Left–Valencian People's Union results are compared to the combined totals of Socialist Action Party and Communist Party of the Valencian Country in the 1983 election.

=== Valencia ===
Population: 729,419

== See also ==
- 1987 Valencian regional election
