= Burguera =

Burguera is a surname. Notable people with the surname include:

- Eneko Llanos Burguera (born 1976), Spanish triathlete
- Francesc de Paula Burguera (1928–2015), Spanish journalist and politician
- Rafael Obrador Burguera (born 2004), Spanish footballer
