= Valencian Socialist Action =

Valencian Socialist Action Acció Socialista Valenciana
- Founded: 1962
- Dissolved: 1964
- Merged into: Valencian Socialist Party
- Ideology: Democratic Socialism; Valencian nationalism Self-determination; Antifascism; Països Catalans; Pancatalanism
- Political position: Left-wing

Valencian Socialist Action (in Valencian: Acció Socialista Valencià) was a political party in Valencia, Spain. It existed informally between 1962 and 1964, during the Francoist State, which had banned all the political organizations other than those in the Movimiento Nacional.

== History ==
The party was founded by ex-members of the Social Christian Movement of Catalonia, including Eliseu Climent i Corberà, Joan Francesc Mira i Casterà, Rosa Raga and Vicent Àlvarez i Rubio. The party was heavily influenced by the ideas of Joan Fuster, and defended the Catalan Countries. Its members joined the Valencian Socialist Party in late 1964.

== See also ==
- Socialist Party of the Valencian Country
- Valencian Socialist Party
- Valencian nationalism
- Pancatalanism
