= Socialist Party of the Valencian Country (1974) =

Socialist Party of the Valencian Country Partit Socialista del País Valencià
- Founded: 1974
- Dissolved: 1978
- Merger of: Group of Socialist Action and Thought independents Socialist Convergence of the Valencian Country (1976)
- Merged into: Socialist Party of the Valencian Country-PSOE
- Newspaper: El poble valencià
- Ideology: Democratic Socialism; Valencian nationalism Antifascism; Pancatalanism; Republicanism
- Political position: Left-wing
- National affiliation: People's Socialist Party Socialist Unity (1977)

Valencian Socialist Party (in Valencian: Partit Socialista del País Valencià) was a political party in Valencia, Spain. It existed between 1974 and 1978, during the Francoist dictatorship and the early Spanish transition to democracy, which had banned all the political organizations other than those in the Movimiento Nacional. The party wasn't legalized until the 9 of April 1977.

== Ideology ==
The party considered that Valencians were a "singular people", part of the cultural and national unity of the Catalan Countries. The PSPV defended confederalism as the best solution to the internal organization of Spain.

== History ==
Its founders came from different left-wing currents, but the majority were members or had been close to the historic Valencian Socialist Party. The party experimented a significant growth in 1975, specially in Horta Nord, the stronghold of the PSPV.

The party was legalized in April 1977, presenting a common candidacy with the People's Socialist Party called Socialist Unity. The coalition gained 1 MP and 1 senator in the 1977 elections, the first democratic ones since 1936. Due to the good results of the PSOE, that won in the Valencian Country, a sector in the PSPV defended joining that party. Finally, in 1978, the majority sector of the PSPV voted in favour of joining the Valencian federation of the PSOE, forming the Socialist Party of the Valencian Country-PSOE. The other sector decided to join other political movements, including the Communist Party of the Valencian Country and the Nationalist Party of the Valencian Country.

== See also ==
- Valencian Socialist Party
- Socialist Party of the Valencian Country-PSOE
- Valencian nationalism
