= Vicente Ruiz Monrabal =

Spanish lawyer and politician

Vicente Ruiz Monrabal (1936 in Sedaví, Spain – 2011) was a Spanish lawyer and politician.

Ruiz qualified as a lawyer at the University of Valencia. During his time at University he became President of the Rural Catholic Youth group and a member of Young Catholic Action. In the 1960s he became involved with Christian democratic groups helping to found the Democratic Union of the Valencian Country (Spanish: Unión Democrática del País Valenciano) in 1967 and becoming Secretary General of that group.

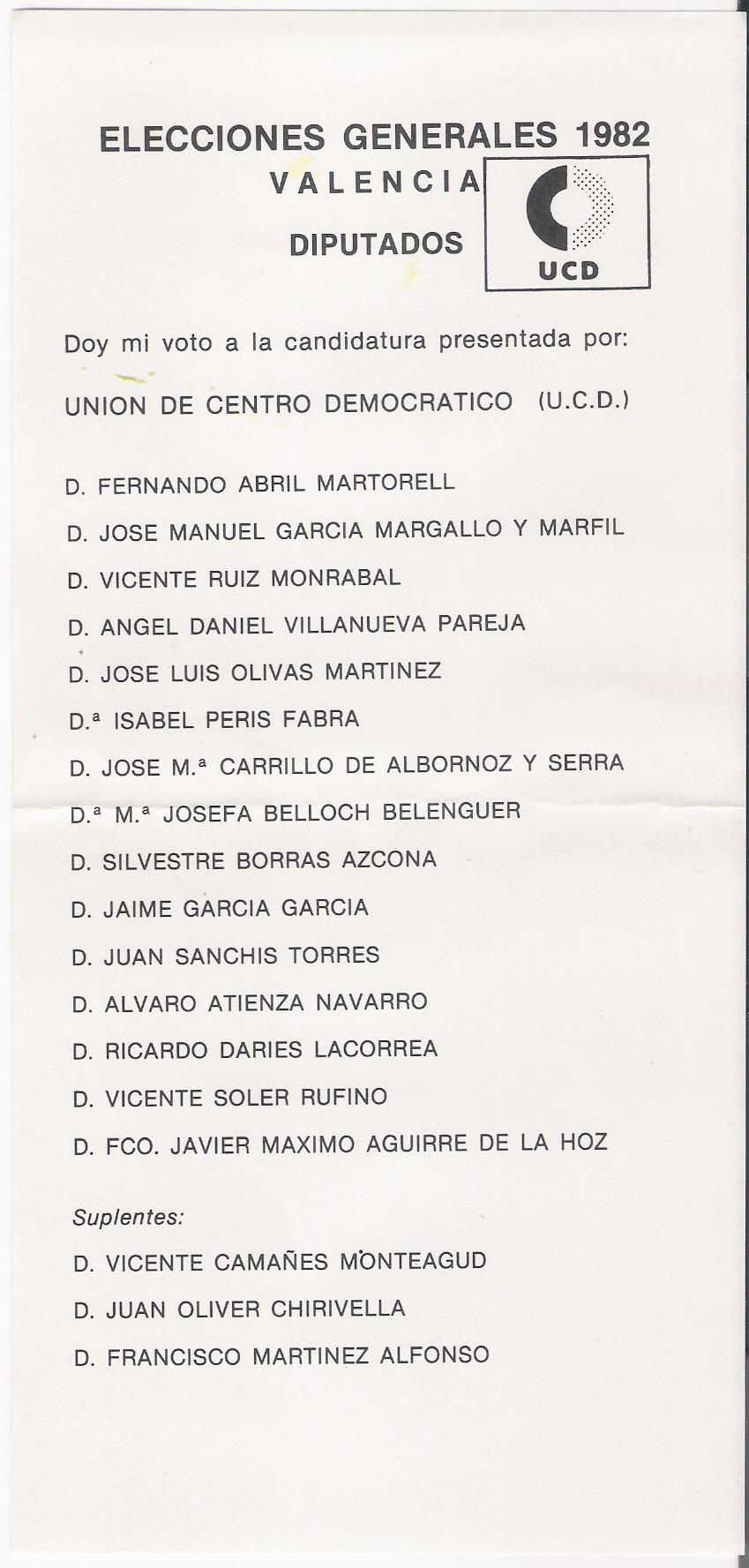
UCD's list for Valencia Province (1982 General Election). Mr. Ruiz Monrabal has the third place.

In the 1970s he was involved with meetings of the various anti-Franco groups which were operating in secret.

He headed the party list in Valencia Province at the 1977 General Election but was unsuccessful.

Shortly afterwards he joined the Union of the Democratic Centre (UCD) and was elected to the Spanish Congress of Deputies for Valencia Province at the 1979 General Election, serving until 1982. Within the UCD he was one of those who argued for greater autonomy for the Valencian Community at a time when an internal conflict was underway within the UCD over the future status of the Valencian Community and the symbols to be used there. Consequently he spoke at party meetings in Spanish rather than Valencian in order to avoid being branded as "Catalanist."

He was present in Congress during the attempted coup known as 23F, believing that the group of armed men who were taking over the Congress Chamber were members of the violent Basque separatist group ETA.

In 1982 he withdrew from the UCD and followed former Prime Minister Adolfo Suarez and others into the newly formed Democratic and Social Centre (CDS) but failed to hold his seat as a CDS member at the 1982 General Election. Subsequently he had a brief period as a member of the People's Party before retiring from political life.

He died of a heart attack in his native Sedaví on 9 September 2011.
