= Valencian Socialist Party =

Valencian Socialist Party Partit Socialista Valencià
- Founded: 1964
- Dissolved: 1968
- Merged into: PSPV
- Ideology: Democratic Socialism; Valencian nationalism Self-determination; Antifascism; Països Catalans; Christian left
- Political position: Left-wing

Valencian Socialist Party (Valencian: Partit Socialista Valencià) was a political party in Valencia, Spain. It existed informally between 1962 and 1968, during the Francoist State, which had banned all the political organizations other than those in the Movimiento Nacional.

== History ==
Its founders came from different left-wing currents. One sector came from Joventuts del Rat Penat led by Alfons Cucó. Another grouping had their origins in the Valencian Marxist Front (including Eliseu Climent).

In 1964 Valencian Socialist Action joined the PSV.

The PSV published Esquerra.

== See also ==
- Socialist Party of the Valencian Country
- Socialist Party of the Valencian Country-PSOE
- Valencian nationalism
