= Valencian Marxist Front =

Valencian Marxist Front Front Marxista Valencià
- Founded: 1954
- Dissolved: Mid 1960's
- Ideology: Communism; Valencian nationalism Antifascism
- Political position: Left-wing
- Colours: Red

Valencian Marxist Front (Valencian: Front Marxista Valencià), an underground communist group in the Valencian Community, Spain, founded in 1954 by youth active in Lo Rat Penat. It disappeared in 1962, when its members joined either the Valencian Socialist Party or the Communist Party of Spain (later forming the Communist Party of the Valencian Country).

FMV had a left-wing nationalist line, promoting Valencian identity. Leading members included Francesc Codonyer and Enric Tàrrega.
