= Nationalist Party of the Valencian Country =

Nationalist Party of the Valencian Country Partit Nacionalista del País Valencià
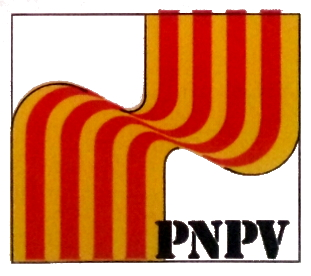
- Spokesperson: Francesc de Paula Burguera
- Founded: 1978
- Dissolved: 1984
- Merged into: Valencian People's Union
- Ideology: Valencian nationalism Social democracy Catalanism
- Town councillors (1979-1982): 12 / 5,352

The Nationalist Party of the Valencian Country (in Valencian: Partit Nacionalista del País Valencià, PNPV) was a political party created in 1978 by ex-members of the Democratic Union of the Valencian Country. In 1984 the party merged with the Left Grouping of the Valencian Country to form the Valencian People's Union.

== Ideology ==
The party was social democratic, nationalist and defended the link between the Valencian people and the Catalan people, although opposing the Catalan Countries as a political project.
