= Francesc de Paula Burguera =

Spanish journalist and politician

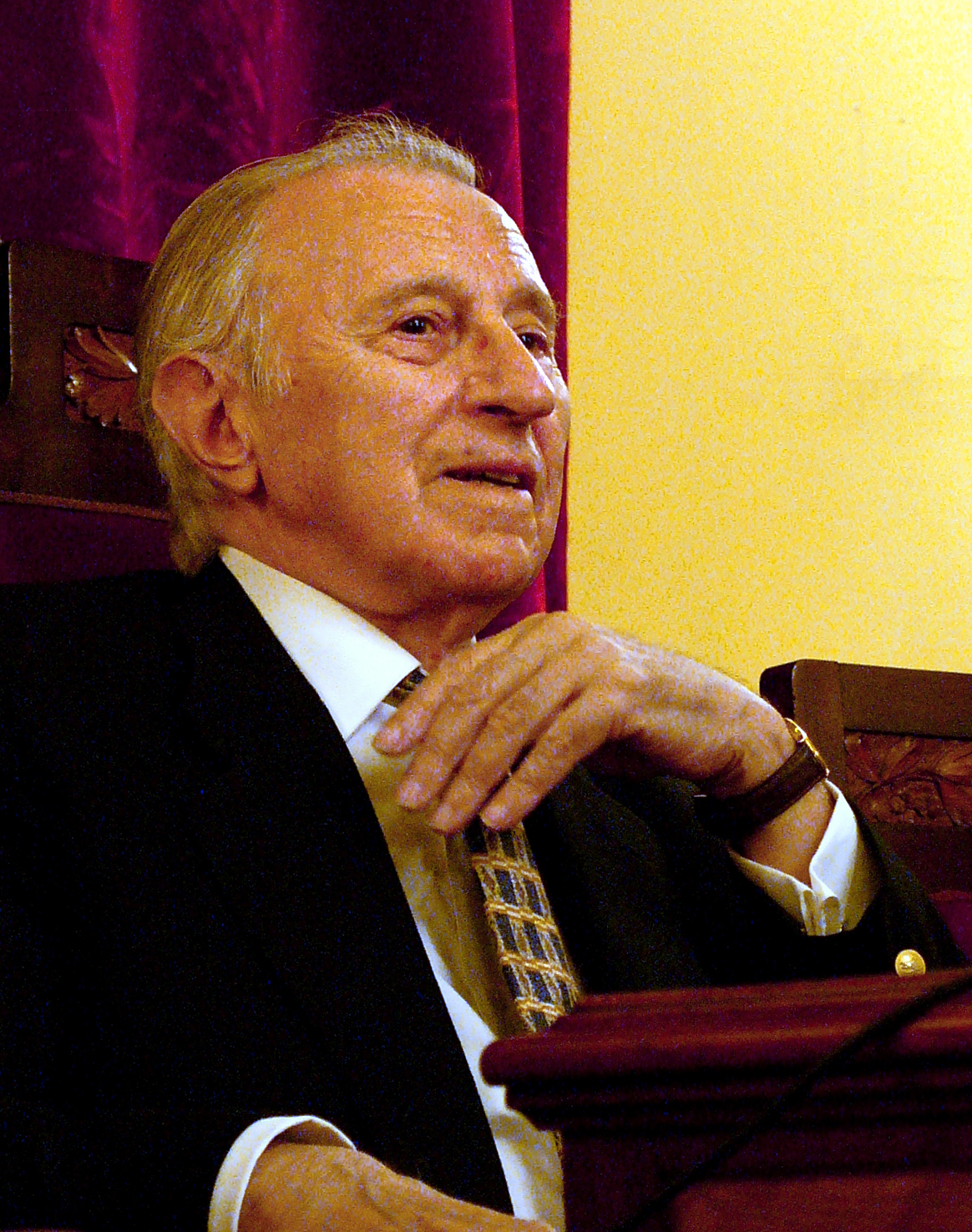
Burguera in 2010

Francesc de Paula Burguera i Escrivà (13 July 1928 – 16 October 2015) was a Spanish journalist and politician.

Born in Sueca, Valencia, Burguera served in the Congress of Deputies from 1977 to 1979, representing his hometown district. He was awarded the Creu de Sant Jordi in 1999, and died in 2015.
