= Nationalist Valencian Party =

Nationalist Valencian Party Partit Valencià Nacionalista
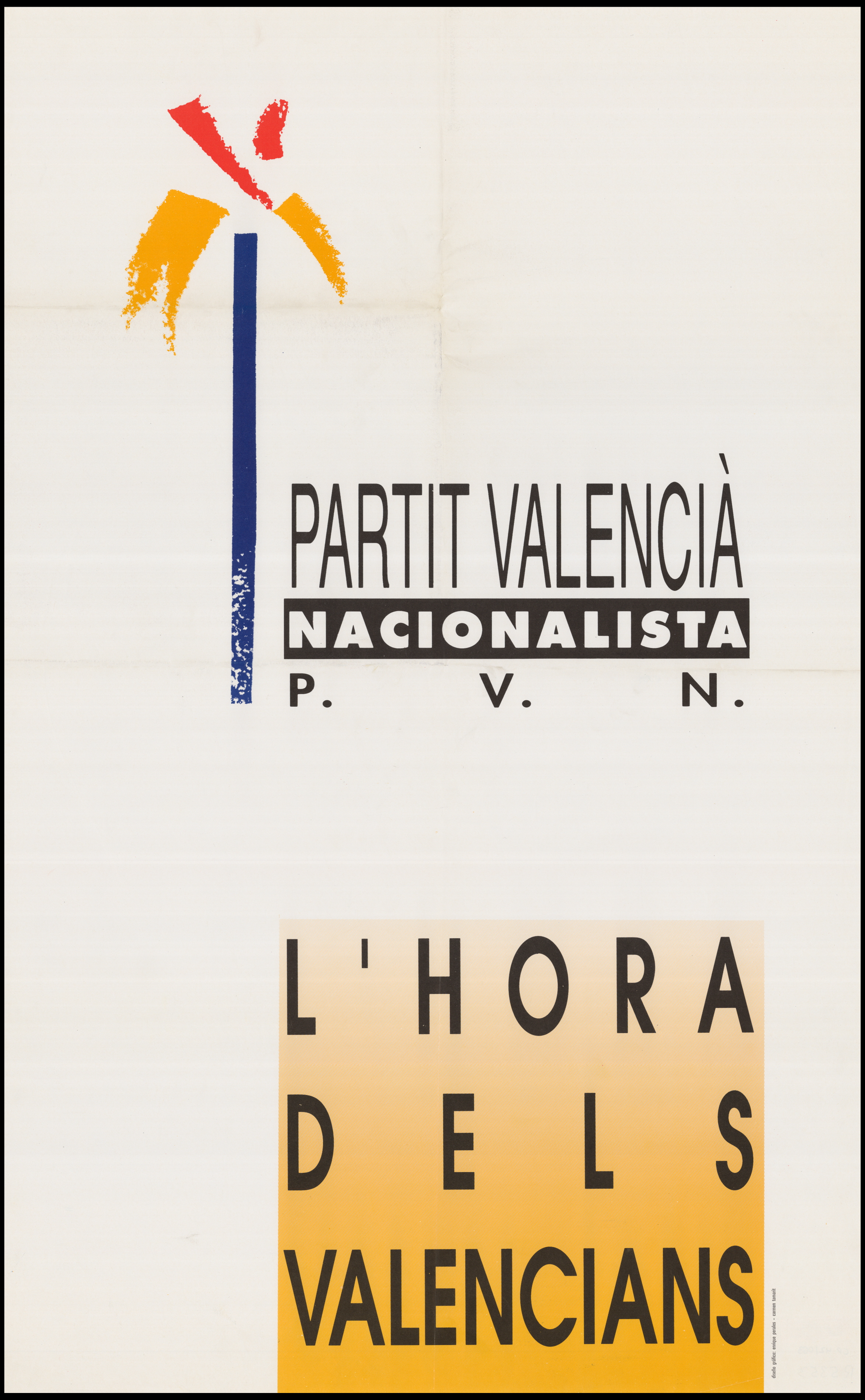
- Spokesperson: Pepa Chesa i Vila
- Founded: 1990
- Dissolved: 2000
- Split from: Valencian People's Union
- Succeeded by: Valencian Nationalist Bloc
- Ideology: Valencian nationalism Progressivism
- Political position: Centre to Centre-left
- Town councillors (1991-1995): 10 / 5,352

The Nationalist Valencian Party (in Valencian: Partit Valencià Nacionalista, PVN) was a political party created in 1990 as an offshoot of the Valencian People's Union.

== Ideology ==
The party defined itself as progressive, inter-classist and centrist. The party was more moderate than the Valencian People's Union, both in its national and social ideas. While the PVN came from the pro-Catalan tradition of valencianism, it rejected the Catalan Countries as a political project.
