= Communist Movement of the Valencian Country =

Spanish political party

Communist Movement of the Valencian Country Moviment Comunista del País Valenciá
- Leader: Cristina Piris; Carles Dolç; Just Ramírez
- Founded: 1972 as the Communist Movement of Spain in the Valencian Country; 1976; Reorganization as the Communist Movement of the Valencian Country
- Dissolved: 1991
- Merged into: Alternative Left; Ca Revolta
- Headquarters: València
- Newspaper: Servir al Poble
- Youth wing: Valencian Revolutionary Youth
- Ideology: Communism; Valencian nationalism Leninism; Feminism; Catalanism; Maoism (until 1983)
- National affiliation: Communist Movement
- Colors: Red
- Local seats (1979-1983): 27 / 5,343

Communist Movement of the Valencian Country (Valencian: Moviment Comunista del País Valencià, MCPV) was a Spanish communist political party created in the Valencian Country during the last years of the dictatorship of Franco as the Valencian section of the Communist Movement. Originally the party was maoist and heavily pro-Chinese, but since the early 80's the party abandoned maoism in favour of heterodox Marxism and started to support the new social movements, including feminism, LGBT and anti-militarism.

== History ==
In 1977, a member of the party was killed by a fascist of Fuerza Nueva, in one of the first violent episodes of the "Battle of València". 6,000 people attended his funeral. The MCPV gained 27 town councillors in the Spanish municipal elections of 1979. Due to bad electoral results in general elections, the party abandoned electoralism and supported street protests and social movements. It was highly influential in the anti-NATO campaign of the 80's and in the anti-Military service movement. The party joined Alternative Left in 1991.
