= Ermita de Sant Jordi, El Puig =

Chapel in Valencia, Spain

Coordinates: 39.58684°N 0.31307°W

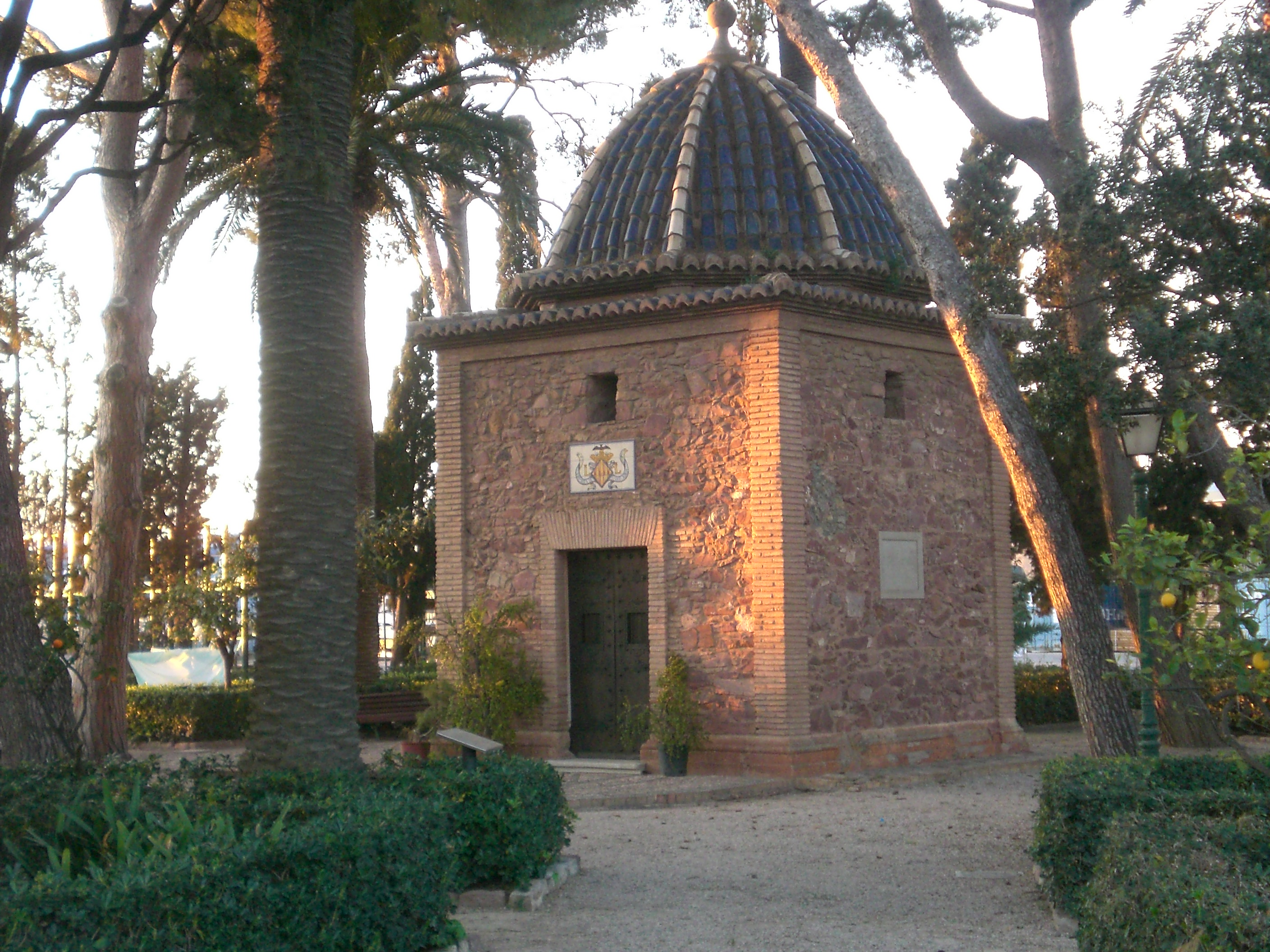
Ermita de Sant Jordi

The Ermita de Sant Jordi (Spanish: Ermita de San Jorge, lit. 'Hermitage of St George') is a Catholic rural hermitage chapel located just outside the town of El Puig in the province of Valencia, Spain.

== History ==
The Ermita de Sant Jordi in 2009

This hermitage was erected in 1631 to celebrate the 1237 Battle of the Puig and the legendary intervention of St George in favor of the Aragonese forces. This victory by James I of Aragon opened the way for his conquest of Valencia. The interior has mosaic designs celebrating the battle. The chapel was restored in 1926 with an elaborate ceremony.
