= El Puig de Santa Maria =

- Municipality
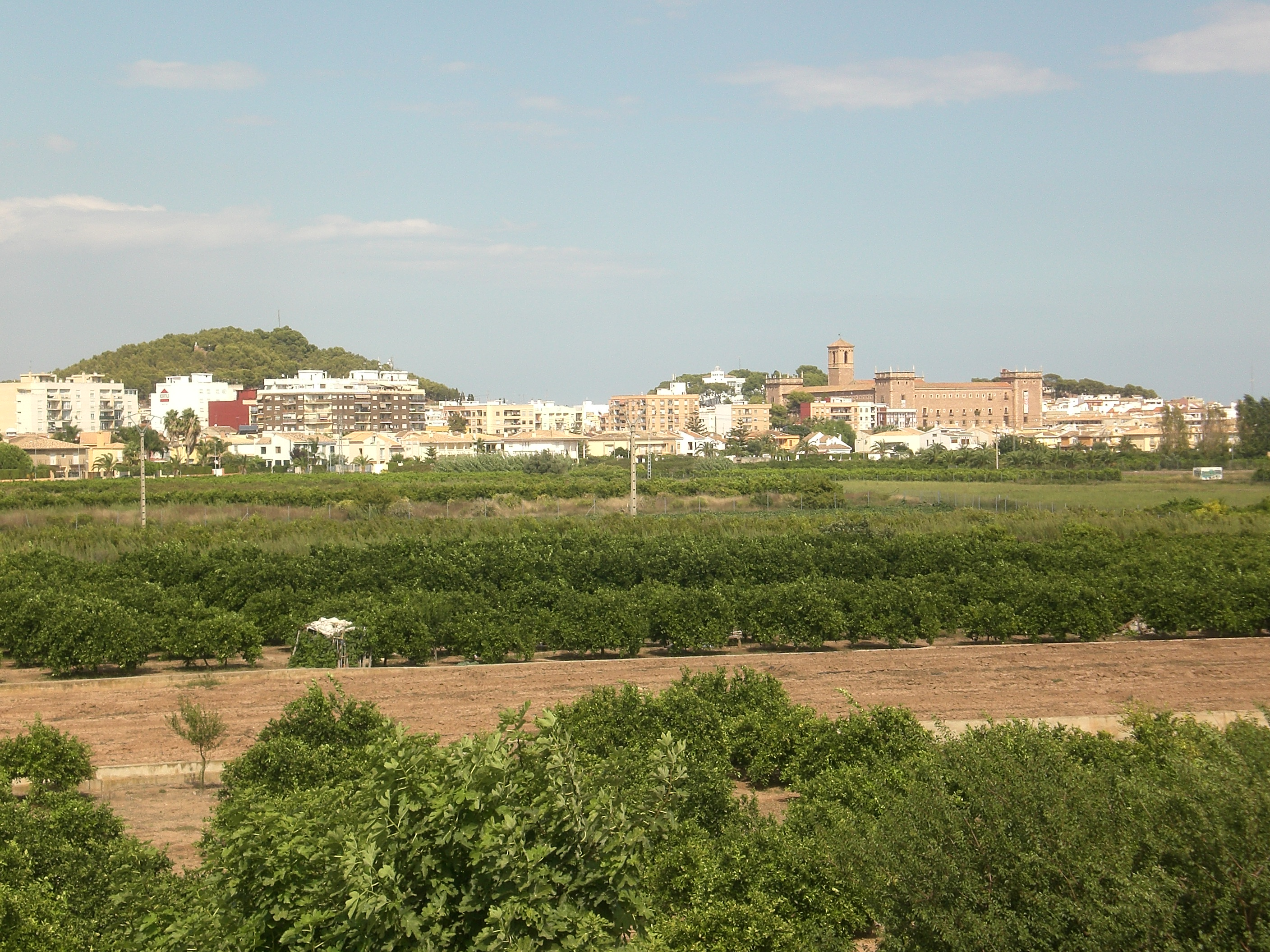
- El Puig with its two wooded hills and the monastery in the centre

- Flag Coat of arms

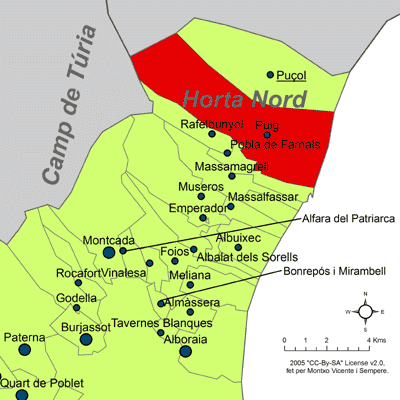
- Location of El Puig in Horta Nord.

- Location in Spain
- Coordinates: 39°35′22.52″N 0°18′11″W
- Country: Spain
- Autonomous community: Valencian Community
- Province: Valencia
- Comarca: Horta Nord
- Judicial district: Massamagrell

Government
  - Alcalde: Luisa Salvador ((PSPV-PSOE))

Area
  - Total: 26.8 km^{2} (10.3 sq mi)
- Elevation: 50 m (160 ft)

Population (2025-01-01)
  - Total: 9,490
  - Density: 354/km^{2} (917/sq mi)
- Demonym(s): Pugenc, pugenca
- Time zone: UTC+1 (CET)
  - Summer (DST): UTC+2 (CEST)
- Postal code: 46540
- Official language(s): Valencian
- Website: Official website

El Puig (Valencian: [el ˈputʃ]), officially El Puig de Santa Maria since 2012 (also known as El Puig d'Enesa or El Puig de Cebolla), is a village situated 15 km north of the city of Valencia in the comarca of Horta Nord, Spain. Its name means "hill" in Valencian). The municipality comprises three main areas, the first being the village itself, which is dominated by a monastery, and two large wooded hills next to it, the largest of which has the ruins of a castle fortress at the top. Originally, however, there was another hill named La Pedrera (i.e. the Stone Quarry) which disappeared gradually during the 20th century to make way for the V-21 motorway, with the rock being used to construct one of the jetties at Valencia's port. The second section is the coastal area of 4 km of beach with eight housing developments that are generally only inhabited in the summer; and finally, there is an industrial park located between them.

The village is well connected, with direct access to the V-21 Valencia to Barcelona motorway and a short distance away from the A-7 Valencia bypass. There is also the Renfe C-6 Valencia to Castellón de la Plana local train service from the village every half hour, and an hourly bus service to Valencia via El Puig beach.

== Economy ==
Until very recently the economy has basically been agriculture; however, it is in a state of gradual transformation towards an industrial plan, which is fundamentally based on the metal industry. The types of agriculture in El Puig include cattle, poultry, pig farming, corn and other crops but by far the main economic income is through the cultivation and export of oranges. The industrial sector has a number of sheet metal factories, food processing plants, wood product manufacturers, a beer and ionized water manufacturer and many other trade sector related activities. The fishing industry has disappeared but its beaches are now very much in demand in the summer with its residential urbanisations.

There are two areas indicated for future housing development in El Puig; the first is located to the north of the village, where there are plans for approximately 1,200 homes, that have started to be built, and is the location of a new secondary school that has been constructed. The second is near the coastal area close to the beaches, where 6255 houses and apartments are planned to be built around a golf course; planning permission was finally granted in 2009; however, construction has yet to start.

== History ==
It is thought El Puig has been inhabited since pre-historic times, but the first recorded record is of a Muslim fortress situated on the muntanya de la patà (mountain of the kick), named after a legend where J. El Puig was conquered by El Cid in 1093 on the way to his conquest of Valencia; however, it was briefly retaken by the Muslims.

El Puig became a symbolic location for Valencians when it was conquered for good by James I of Aragon in 1237 at the Battle of the Puig. The reason the largest hill was named muntanya de la patà (mountain of the kick), as the legend goes, that when James I of Aragon reached the summit with his horse they saw the city of Valencia in the distance, the horse then reared up on to its two back legs with excitement and brought its two front feet down with such force that water sprang from the ground and one of its horse shoes became imbedded into the hill.

A symbol of the reconquest is represented by the Virgin of El Puig. An Marian image, which according to legend, was seen by James I, and which granted Christians the ability to defeat the Moors and retake Valencia. Thus James I proclaimed this image of the Virgin Mary as the patron of the newly conquered Kingdom of Valencia, during this time El Puig was known as the spiritual capital of the kingdom.

In 1240 the El Puig was donated to Arnau de Cardona. However, in 1340 Peter IV of Aragon gave it to Pedro de Jérica, and then in 1353 to Nicolau Janvila. Finally in 1385 the king sold El Puig to Pedro de Centelles. El Puig was separated from La Pobla de Farnals in 1608 and the last territorial lords were the Marquess of Belgium and the Municipality of Valencia.

== Local festivals ==
January - Last weekend in January is the festival of Peter Nolasco, the founder of the Order of the Blessed Virgin Mary of Mercy. It is common in this town during this festival to throw dead rats at other people.

February - The second Sunday of February is the festival of Saint Anthony the patron of animals.

March - The fire festival "Las Fallas" is celebrated from 14 to 19 March.

June - On the evening of 23 June are the fires of Saint Joan where, on the beaches, bonfires and firework displays are held.

August - The San Roque Festival is held between the 15 and 17 of August but in reality is celebrated for the whole of the month. The celebrations mainly consist of street parties followed by bull runs in the streets of the village.

September - On the first Sunday and Monday of the month of September the people of El Puig celebrate the festival of the Virgin which comprises street processions of the virgin of Puig.

October - The Valencian Community day is held on 9 October.

== Gallery ==
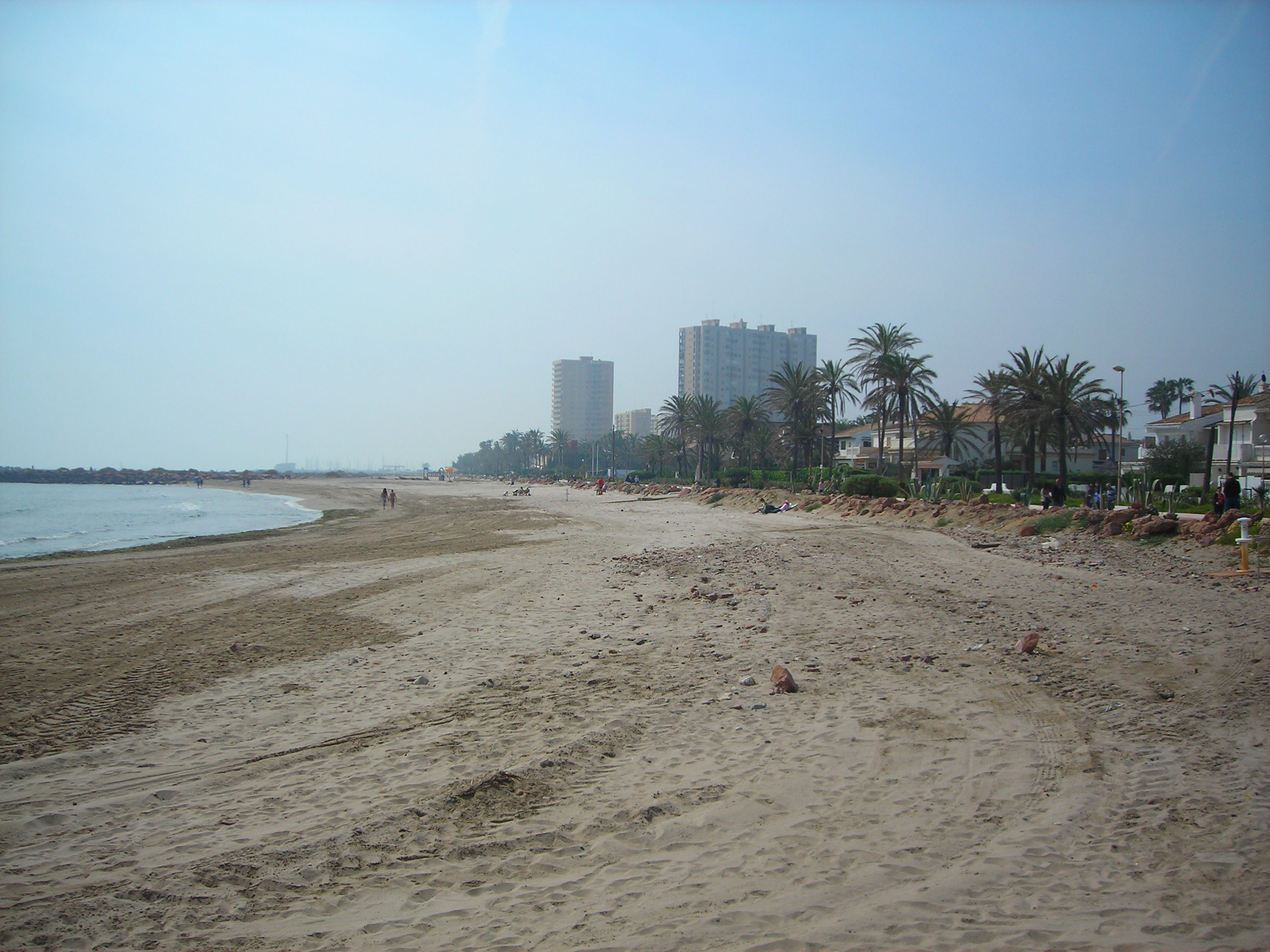
El Puig beach

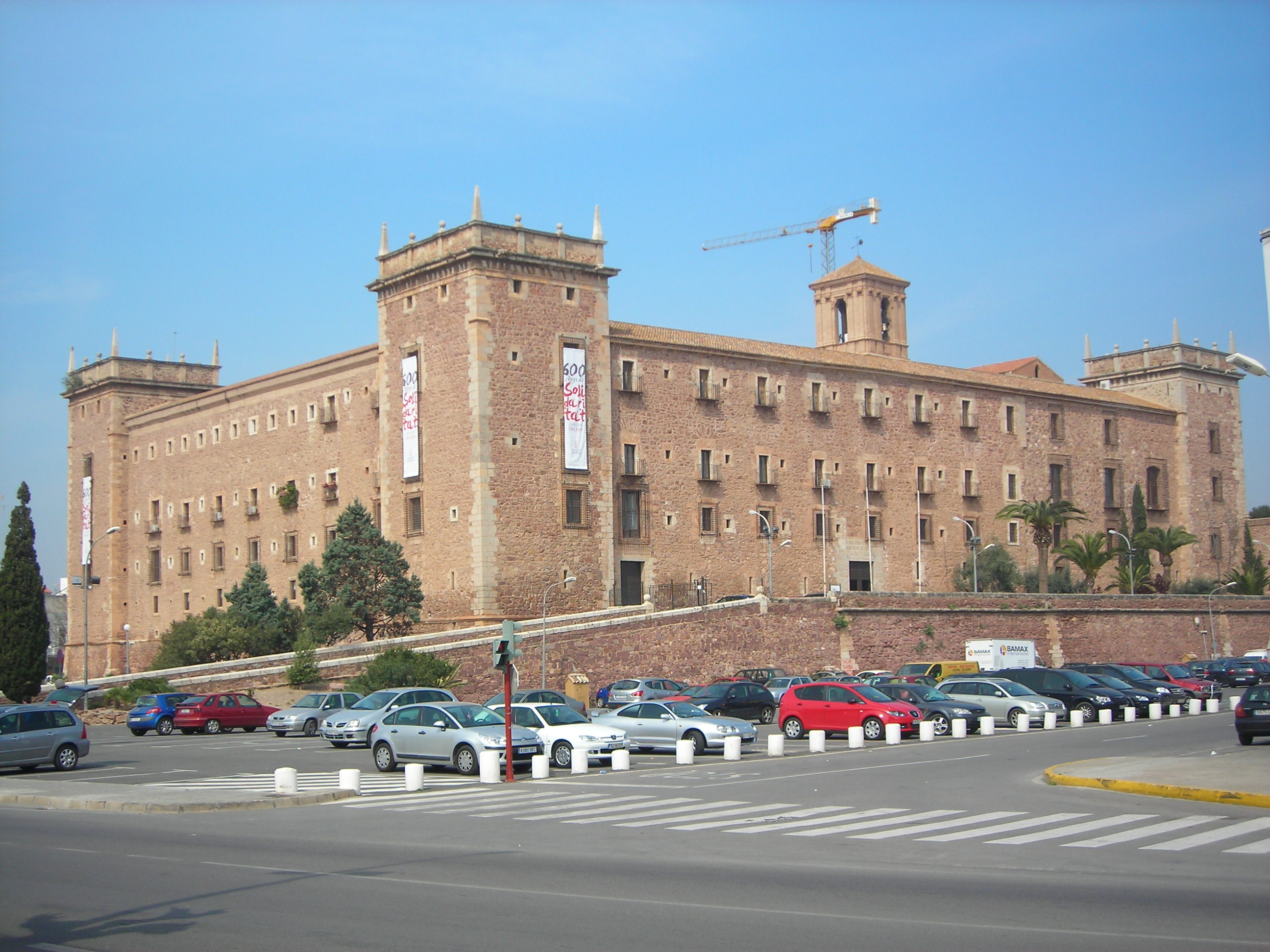
St Mary's Monastery

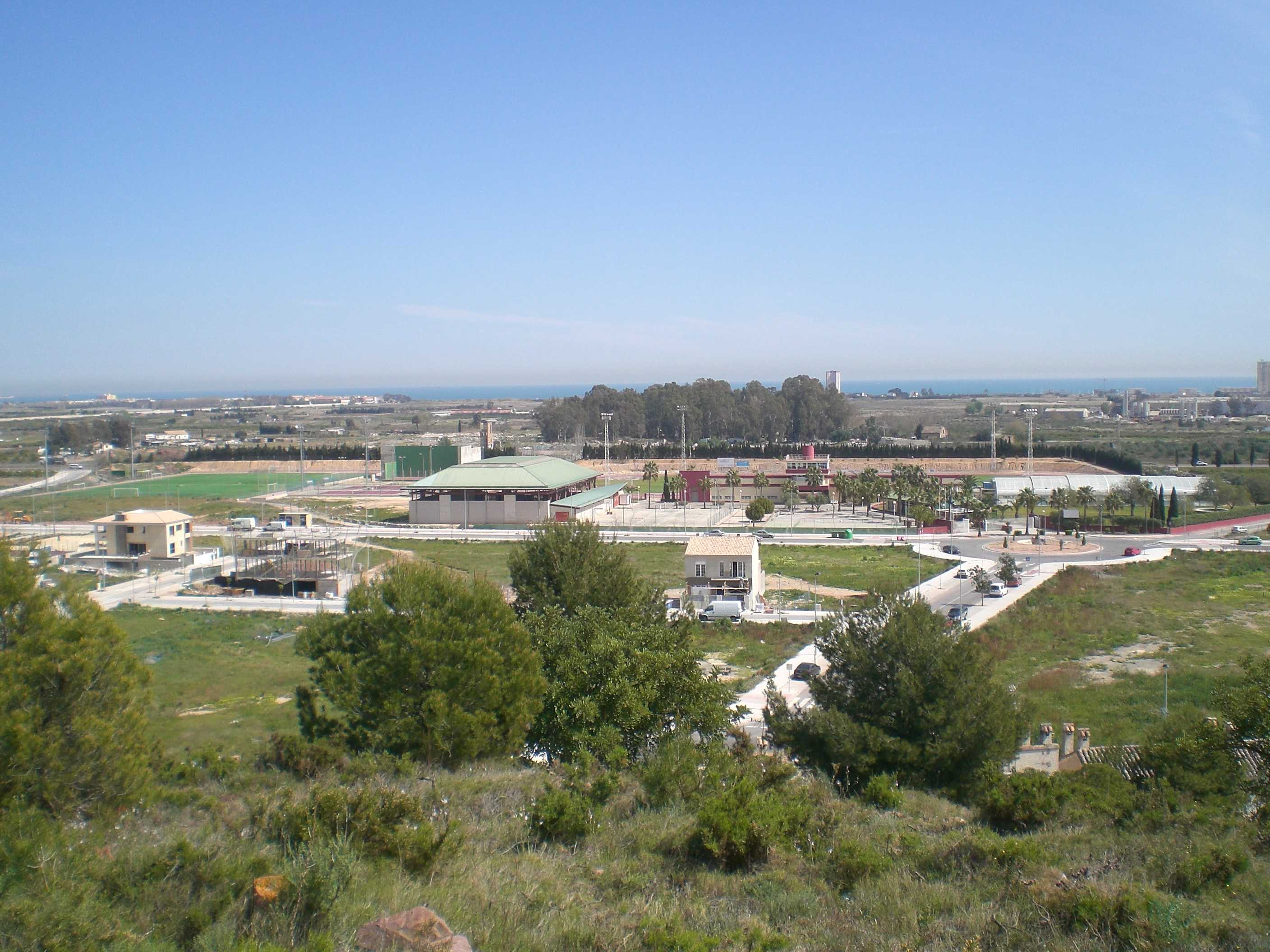
Sports complex where muntanya de la Pedrera once stood

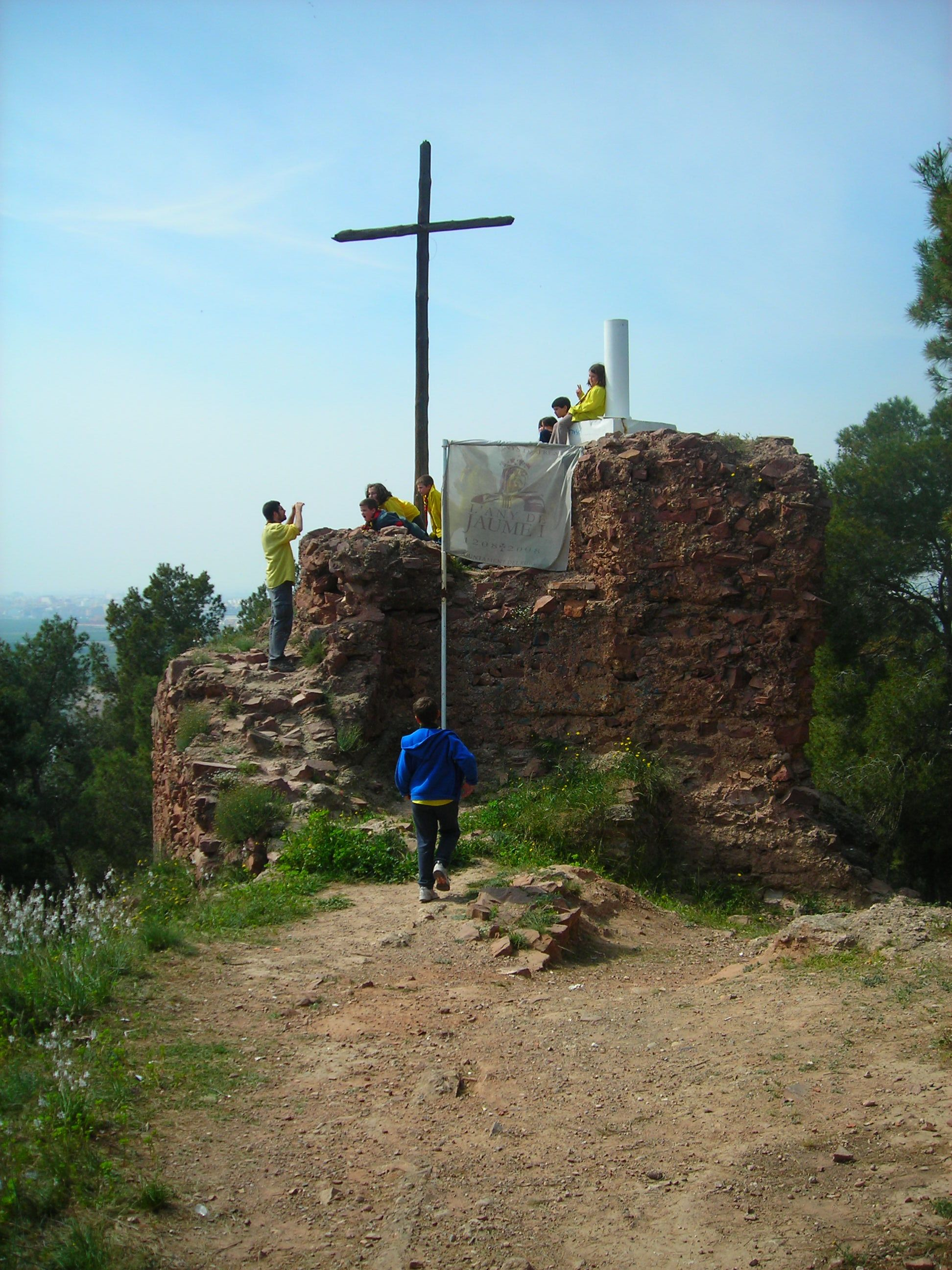
Remains of the castle on muntanya de la patà

View from muntanya de Santa Bárbara with Sagunto Castle and Puzol in distance

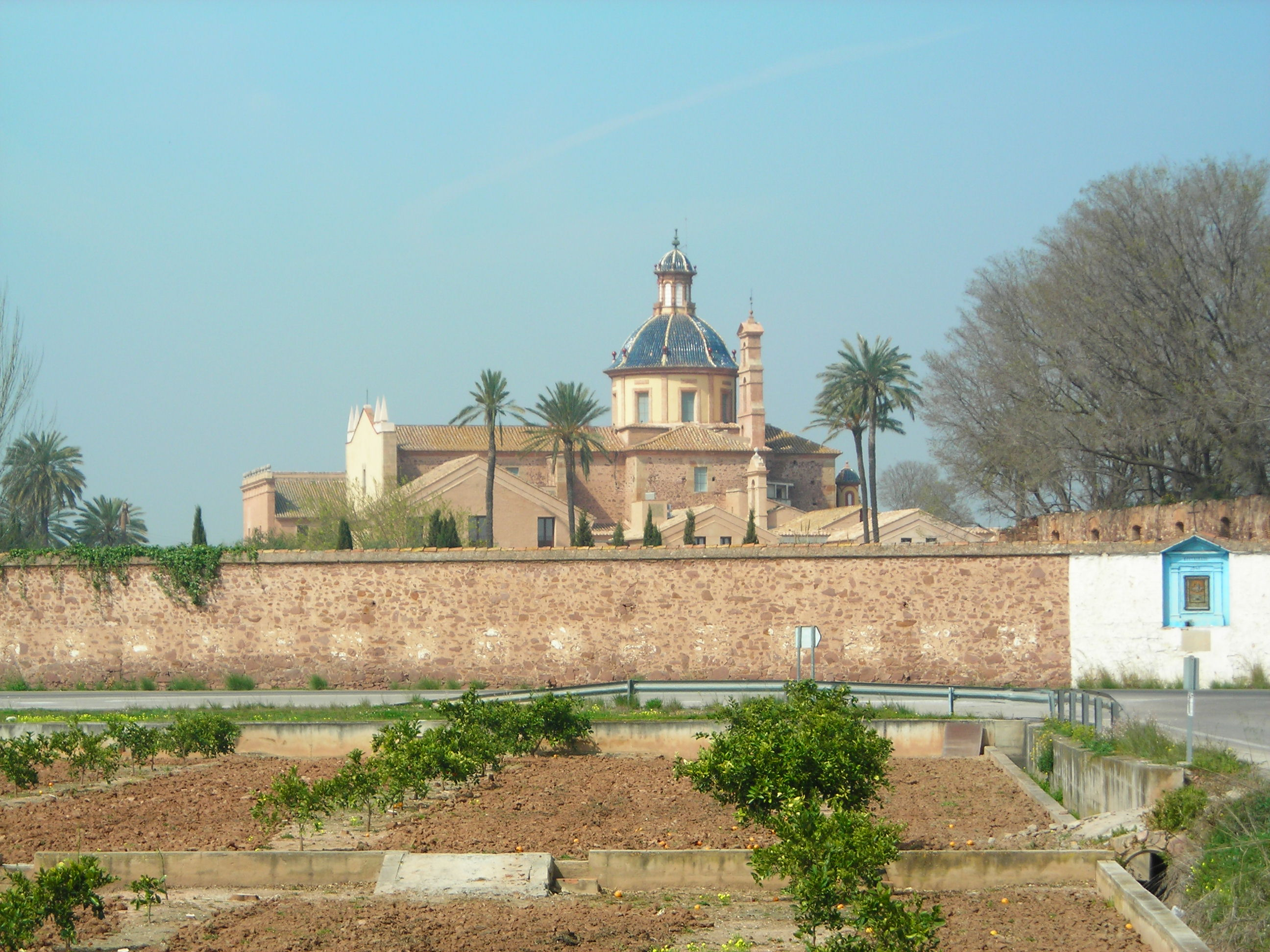
Ara Christi Charterhouse, El Puig

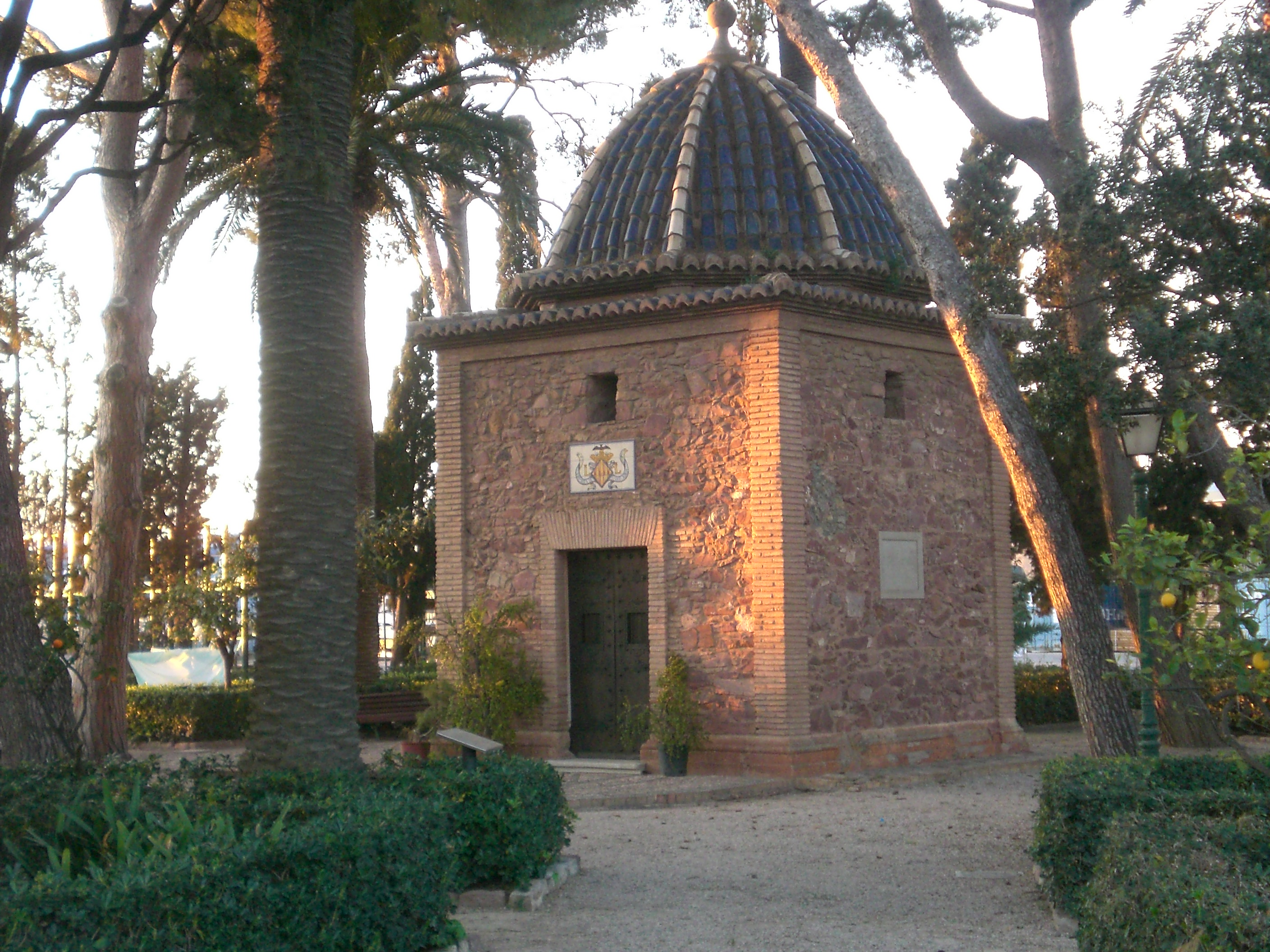
St Georges Hermitage, El Puig (Eremita de Sant Jordi)

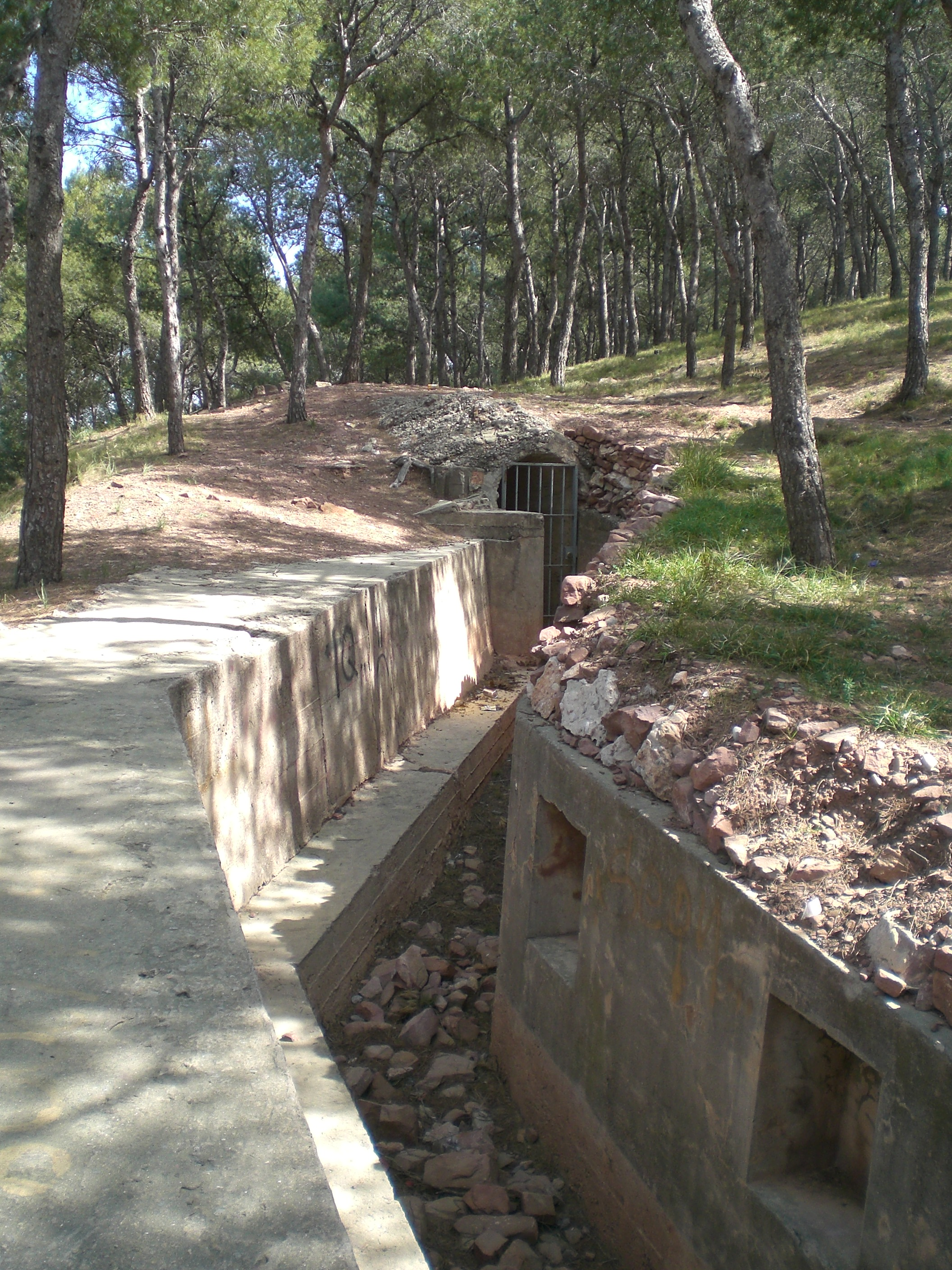
Civil war fortifications on muntanya de la patà

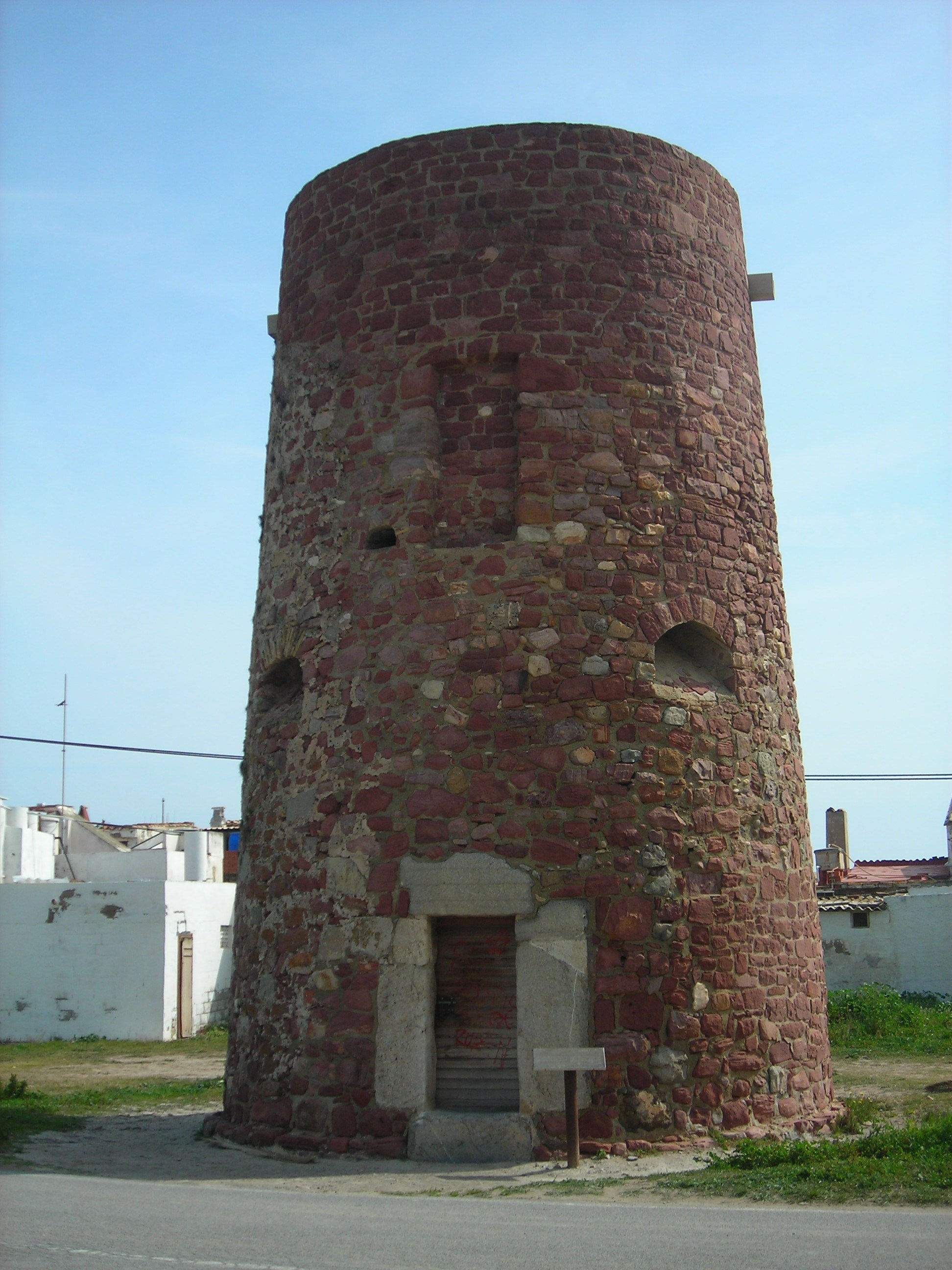
La Torre de Guaita (Sentry Tower)

== See also ==
- List of municipalities in Valencia
