= Porta Coeli Charterhouse =

Monastery in Serra, Spain

Coordinates: 39.6822°N 0.4733°W

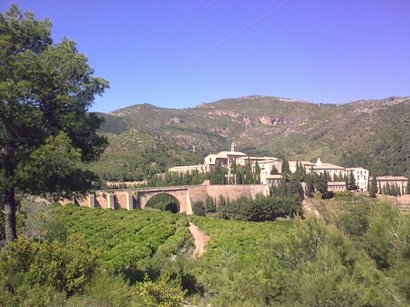
Porta Coeli Charterhouse (2009)

Porta Coeli Charterhouse, Cartuja de Porta Coeli or Cartuja Santa María de Porta Coeli, is a functioning Carthusian monastery located on a rural site of the municipality of Serra de Porta Coeli in the province of Valencia, Spain. The name of the charterhouse, Porta Coeli, means door of heaven.

== History ==
The monastery was founded in 1272 under the sponsorship of Andrés Albalat, Bishop of Valencia and confessor of James I of Aragon. From this monastery came the monks to found the charterhouses of Ara Christi and Via Coeli. Porta Coeli also produced two prominent leaders of the order: Father Bonifacio Ferrer (1402-1410), brother of Saint Vincent Ferrer, and Francisco Maresme (1437-1463).

The monastery was suppressed in the 19th century, and although it tried to regain the site, the order did not return until 1943, with reconsecration in 1947. It was used as a Francoist concentration camp between 1939 and 1941. It remains the only cloistered men's monastery in the province.

Construction at Porta Coeli began at its foundation and continued for centuries, giving the monastery its eclectic architectural contributions. The church is mainly Gothic in style, from the 14th century. In the 18th century it underwent a major Baroque restructuring. Among the works in the church are paintings depicting scenes from the New Testament (18th century) by the painter José Camarón Bonanat. It has portraits of the monks Juan de Nea, Francisco de Aranda, Bonifacio Ferrer and Francisco Maresme. The ceiling was frescoed by Luis Antonio Planes. Visits to the cloisters are limited.
