= Ara Christi Charterhouse =

Monastery in El Puig, Spain

Coordinates: 39.5946°N 0.3206°W

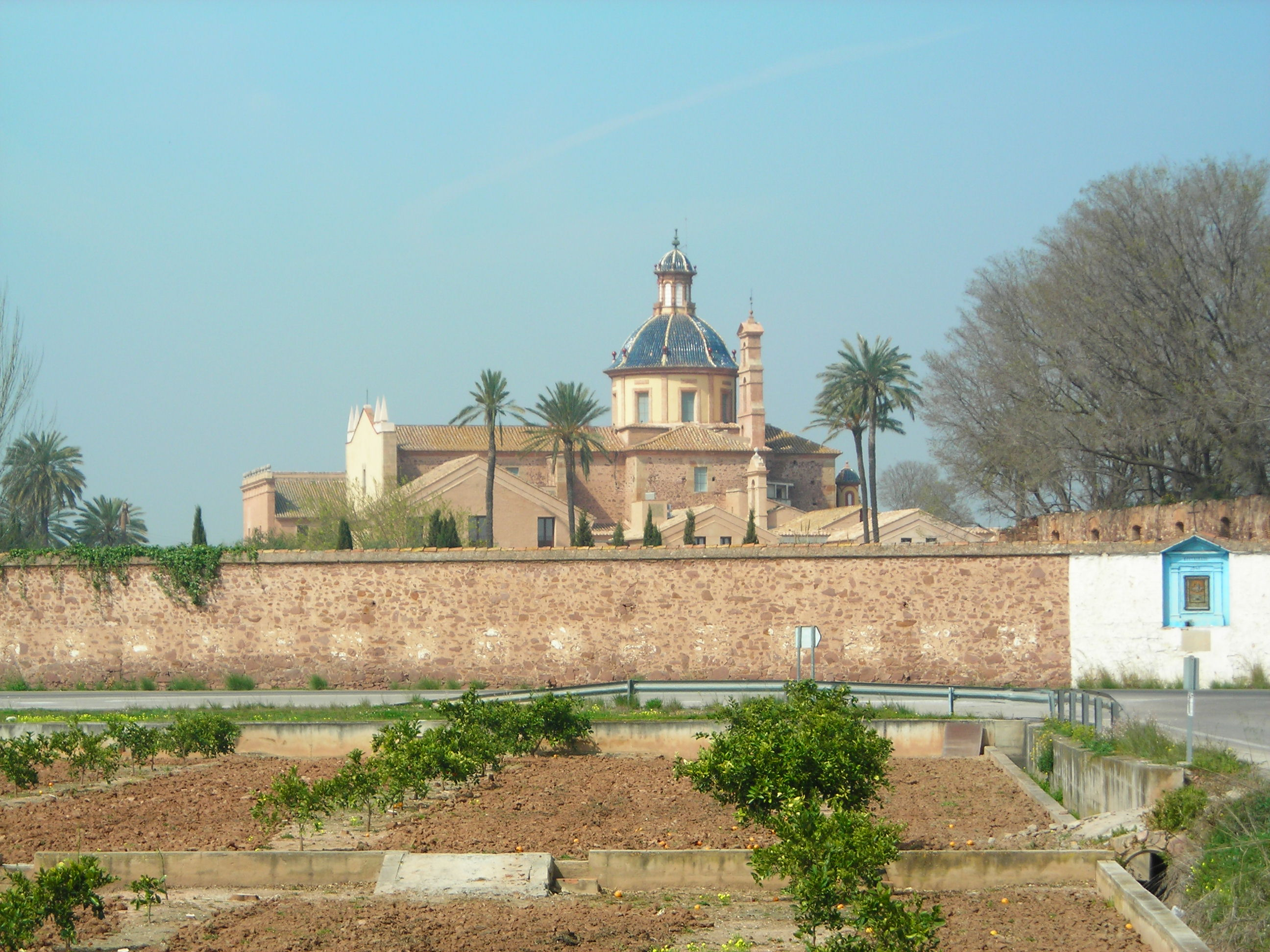
Ara Christi Charterhouse, El Puig

The Ara Christi Charterhouse, or the Cartuja de Ara Christi, is a former Carthusian monastery located just outside the town of El Puig in the province of Valencia, Spain. The site now includes a hotel and utilizes the facilities for functions.

== History ==
The charterhouse was constructed in 1585 by the monk architect Fray Antonio Ortiz, under the sponsorship of the Roig family of Valencia. The monastic community came from the Porta Coeli Charterhouse in Serra, Valencia. The sober, Renaissance-style church suffered stripping of most of the ornaments and paintings by Napoleonic troops in 1808. The Carthusians were suppressed in 1835. The premises subsequently housed Capuchin monks, who abandoned the site in the 1970s.

In 1996 it was declared a Bien de Interés Cultural for Spain.

== Bibliography ==
- BENITO GOERLICH, D. "Cartuja de Ara Christi", Catàleg de monuments i conjunts de la Comunitat Valenciana, Conselleria de Cultura, Educació i Ciència, tom II, València, 1983.
- FERRER ORTS, A., La Reial Cartoixa de Nostra Senyora d'Ara Christi, Ajuntament del Puig, 1999.
- FERRER ORTS, A., "En torno a la actividad constructiva en el reina de valencia durante la primera mitad del siglo XVII. La cartuja de Ara Christi (El Puig)", Actes del XVII Congrés d'història de la Corona d'Aragó (Barcelona-Lleida, 2000), en premsa.
- FERRER ORTS, A., "La dispersión del legado cultural y artístico de la cartuja de Ara Christi (provincia de Cataluña)en el siglo XIX. Datos para su estudio", Analecta Cartusiana, 181, 2001.
- FERRER ORTS, A., "La historiografia de la cartoixa valenciana d'Ara Christi i els seus artífex (1585-1660)", Boletín de la Sociedada Castellonense de Cultura, en premsa.
- FERRER ORTS, A., "La cúpula de la iglesia cartujana de Ara Christi (El Puig, Valencia). Génesis, evolución y artífices de su construcción", en premsa.
- GALBIS BLANCO, M. D., "Un monasterio valenciano: la cartuja de Ara Christi del Puig", Primer Congreso de Historia del País Valenciano (1971), vol. III, Universitat de València, 1976.
- GINER y ARAGÓN, J. B., Fundación y progressos de Ara Christi, convento de religiosos cartuxos (ed. crítica i transcripció d'Albert Ferrer Orts), Analecta Cartusiana, en premsa.
- HOGG, J., "La cartuja de Ara Christi", Analecta Cartusiana, 41:8, 1980.
- ORTÍ Y MAYOR, J. V., Fundación de el Real Monasterio de Ara Christi, de monges cartuxos, en el reyno de Valencia, València 1732.
- ROCA MIQUEL; R:; "La antigua Real Cartuja de Ara Christi", Valencia Atracción, XL (2a època), 366, 1965.
- SARTHOU CARRERES, C. "La cartuja de Ara Christi", Boletín de la Sociedad Castellonense de Cultura, tom IV, 1923.
- SARTHOU CARRERES, C. "Monasterios valencianos (su historia y su arte)", València, 1943.
- VALLÉS, J. de, "Primer instituto de la sagrada religió de la Cartuxa. Fundaciones de los conventos de toda España, mártires de Inglaterra y generales de toda la Orden", 1663 (reed. Barcelona 1792).
- VV.AA., "Les cartoixes valencianes, guia editada pels ajuntaments d'Altura", Serra i d'El Puig, 2003.
