= Monastery of Santa Maria, El Puig =

Monastery in El Puig, Spain

The Monasterio de Santa Maria is a Gothic-style church and Renaissance-style monastery located in the town of El Puig in the province of Valencia, Spain.

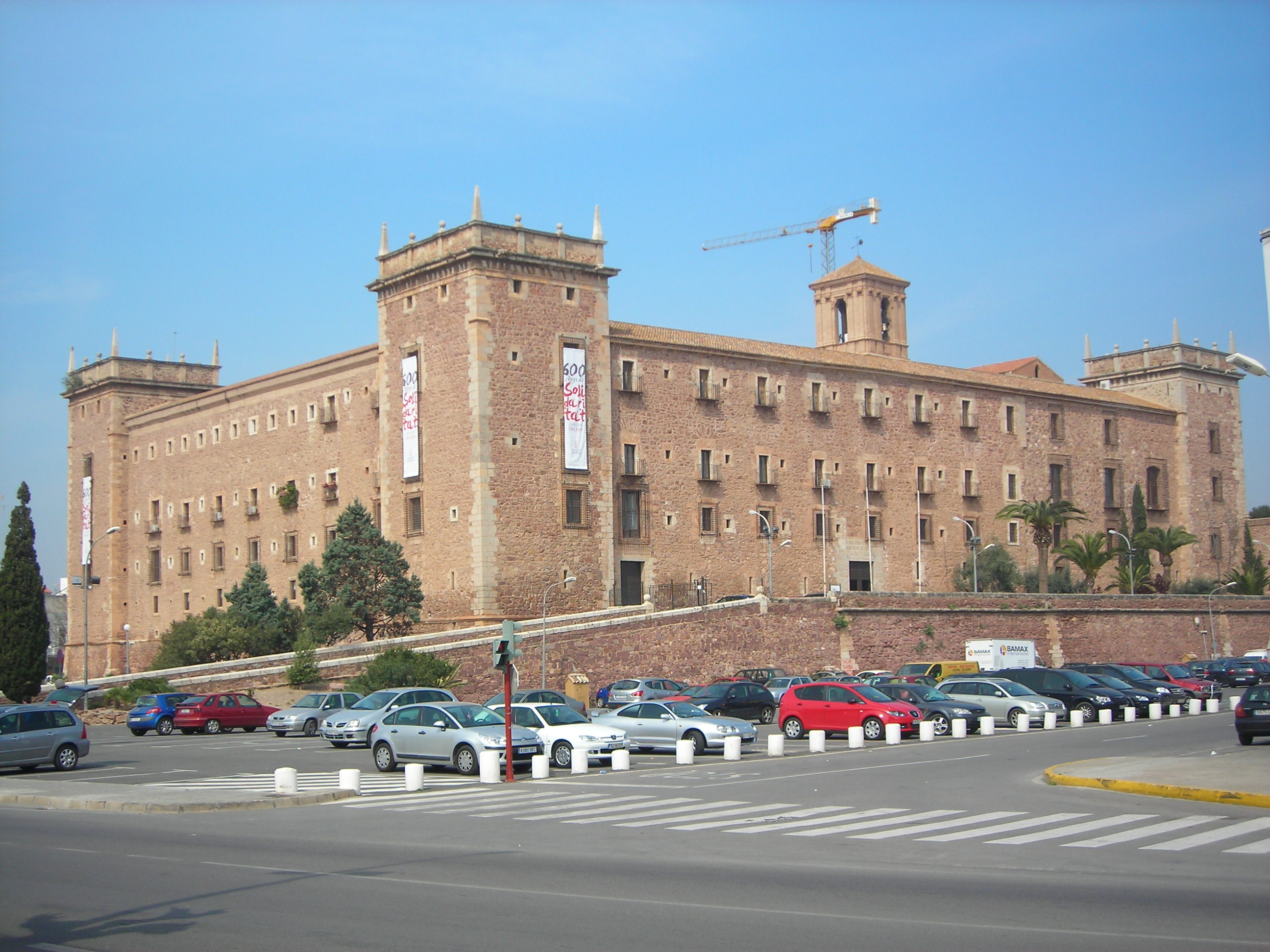
St Mary's Monastery, El Puig

== History ==
In 1237, King Jaume I built a church on this hill, when the priest Peter Nolasco found hidden under a fallen bell, a Byzantine icon of Our Lady of the Angels (Nuestra Señora de los Ángeles). Assuming this had survived the Moorish occupation, a church was completed by 1240 and affiliated with the Mercedarian order. Soon the church was insufficient for the flood of pilgrims seeking favors from the patroness of the Kingdom of Valencia, and in 1300, the present gothic church was built. In 1588 the imposing monastery was built.

From the monastery, one can visit the cloisters; the Salón Real, used by monarchs on their visits to Valencia; the Salón Gótico of Jaume I; and the Salón of Ceramics.

== Conservation ==
The monastery has had many uses since the 19th century.

The monastery has had a heritage listing since 1969 (originally Monumento Histórico-Artístico Nacional, now Bien de Interés Cultural).
