= List of political parties in Spain =

This article serves as a list of the political parties in Spain.

Spain has a multi-party system at both the national and regional level, the major parties nationwide being the People's Party (PP) and the Spanish Socialist Workers' Party (PSOE).

Spain was formerly considered to have a two-party system dominated by the PSOE and the PP; however, the current makeup has no formation or coalition with enough seats to claim a parliamentary majority in the bicameral Cortes Generales (consisting of both the national Congress of Deputies and regional representation in the Senate). Regional parties can be strong in autonomous communities, notably Catalonia and the Basque Country, and are often essential for national government coalitions.

== Political parties with parliamentary representation ==
=== Represented in Cortes Generales ===
Party or coalition	Ideology	Leader	Deputies	Senators	MEPs	Regional dep.	Councillors	Status
People's Party (PP); Partido Popular	Conservatism; Christian democracy	Alberto Núñez Feijóo	137 / 350	144 / 266	22 / 61	452 / 1,258	23,412 / 66,979	Opposition
Spanish Socialist Workers' Party (PSOE); Partido Socialista Obrero Español	Social democracy	Pedro Sánchez	121 / 350	91 / 266	20 / 61	354 / 1,258	20,784 / 66,979	Government
Vox; Vox	National conservatism; Right-wing populism	Santiago Abascal	33 / 350	2 / 266	6 / 61	119 / 1,258	1,695 / 66,979	Opposition
Unite; Sumar	Progressivism; Democratic socialism; Green politics	Vacant	31 / 350	0 / 266	3 / 61	38 / 1,258	1,995 / 66,979	Government
Republican Left of Catalonia (ERC); Esquerra Republicana de Catalunya	Catalan independence; Left-wing nationalism; Social democracy	Oriol Junqueras	7 / 350	6 / 265	1 / 61	33 / 1,258	2,903 / 66,979	Support
Together for Catalonia (JxCat); Junts per Catalunya	Catalan independence; Populism	Carles Puigdemont	7 / 350	3 / 265	1 / 61	35 / 1,258	2,683 / 66,979	Opposition
Basque Country Unite (EH Bildu); Euskal Herria Bildu	Basque independence; Abertzale left; Socialism	Arnaldo Otegi	6 / 350	5 / 266	1 / 61	30 / 1,258	1,399 / 66,979	Support
Basque Nationalist Party (EAJ/PNV); Euzko Alderdi Jeltzalea; Partido Nacionalista Vasco	Basque nationalism; Christian democracy; Social democracy	Andoni Ortuzar	5 / 350	5 / 266	1 / 61	31 / 1,258	986 / 66,979	Support
We Can; Podemos	Left-wing populism	Ione Belarra	4 / 350	0 / 266	2 / 61	17 / 1,258	1,995 / 66,979	Support
Commitment Coalition (Compromís); Coalició Compromís	Valencian nationalism; Eco-socialism; Green politics	Joan Baldoví	1 / 350	1 / 265	1 / 61	15 / 1,258	662 / 66,979	Support
Canarian Coalition (CCa); Coalición Canaria	Regionalism; Canarian nationalism; Centrism	Fernando Clavijo Batlle	1 / 350	1 / 266	0 / 61	19 / 1,258	304 / 66,979	Support
Galician Nationalist Bloc (BNG); Bloque Nacionalista Galego	Galician nationalism; Left-wing nationalism; Socialism	Ana Pontón	1 / 350	1 / 266	1 / 61	19 / 1,258	590 / 66,979	Support
Navarrese People's Union (UPN); Unión del Pueblo Navarro	Conservatism; Christian democracy; Regionalism	Javier Esparza	1 / 350	1 / 266	0 / 61	15 / 1,258	298 / 66,979	Opposition
Yes to the Future (GBai); Geroa Bai	Basque nationalism; Social democracy	Uxue Barkos	0 / 350	1 / 266	0 / 61	7 / 50	50 / 66,979	Government
Gomera Socialist Group (ASG); Agrupación Socialista Gomera	Insularism; Social democracy	Casimiro Curbelo	0 / 350	1 / 266	0 / 61	3 / 1,258	34 / 66,979	Government
Independent Herrenian Group (AHI); Agrupación Herreña Independiente	Insularism; Canarian nationalism; Centrism	Narvay Quintero	0 / 350	1 / 266	0 / 61	1 / 70	9 / 66,979	Opposition

=== Represented in regional parliaments ===
Party or coalition	Ideology	Leader	Regional dep.	Councillors	Region
Empty Spain (EV); España Vaciada	Localism; Ruralism	Tomás Guitarte	6 / 1,258	262 / 66,979	
Forward Andalusia (AA); Adelante Andalucía	Andalusian nationalism; Left-wing populism; Anti-capitalism	Teresa Rodríguez	8 / 109	8 / 9,067	Andalusia
Aragonese Party (PAR); Partido Aragonés	Regionalism; Centrism	Alberto Izquierdo	0 / 67	334 / 4,155	Aragón
Aragonese Union (CHA); Chunta Aragonesista	Aragonese nationalism; Eco-socialism	Joaquín Palacín	6 / 67	131 / 4,155	Aragón
Asturias Forum (Foro); Foro Asturias	Regionalism; Liberal conservatism	Carmen Moriyón	1 / 45	38 / 928	Asturias
More for Majorca (Més); Més per Mallorca	Left-wing nationalism; Democratic socialism; Green politics	Lluís Apesteguia	4 / 59	118 / 66,979	Balearic Islands
More for Menorca (MxMe); Més per Menorca	Left-wing nationalism; Democratic socialism; Green politics	Manel Martí	2 / 59	20 / 66,979	Balearic Islands
The Union of Formentera (Sa Unió); Sa Unió de Formentera	Conservatism	Llorenç Córdoba	1 / 59	9 / 66,979	Balearic Islands
New Canaries–Canarian Bloc (NC–BC); Nueva Canarias–Bloque Canarista	Canarian nationalism; Social democracy	Román Rodríguez	5 / 70	105 / 66,979	Canary Islands
Regionalist Party of Cantabria (PRC); Partido Regionalista de Cantabria	Regionalism; Centrism	Miguel Ángel Revilla	8 / 35	298 / 1,041	Cantabria
Leonese People's Union (UPL); Unión del Pueblo Leonés	Regionalism; Autonomism	Luis Mariano Santos	3 / 81	234 / 5,194	Castile and León (León)
Popular Unity Candidacy (CUP); Candidatura d'Unitat Popular	Catalan independence; Anti-capitalism; Socialism	Mireia Vehí	4 / 135	313 / 15,837	Catalonia
Catalan Alliance (AC); Aliança Catalana	Catalan independence; Right-wing populism	Sílvia Orriols	2 / 135	8 / 9,139	Catalonia
Movement for Dignity and Citizenship (MDyC); Movimiento por la Dignidad y la Ciudadanía	Ceutan autonomism; Regionalism	Fatima Hamed	3 / 25		Ceuta
Ceuta Now! (CY!); Ceuta Ya!	Democratic socialism; Ceutan autonomism	Mohamed Mustafa	2 / 25		Ceuta
Coalition for Melilla (CpM); Coalición por Melilla	Social democracy; Progressivism; Regionalism	Mustafa Aberchán	5 / 25		Melilla
We Are Melilla (SML); Somos Melilla	Regionalism	Amin Azmani	1 / 25		Melilla

=== Represented in the European Parliament only ===
Party or coalition	Ideology	Leader	MEPs
The Party is Over (SALF); Se Acabó la Fiesta	Spanish nationalism; Economic liberalism; Right-wing populism	Alvise Pérez	1 / 61

== Political parties without representation ==
=== Single issue parties ===
- Party of the Democratic Karma (Partido del Karma Democrático) (2000–present)
- Internet Party (Partido de Internet) (2009–present)
- Escaños en Blanco [es] (2010–present)
- X Party (Partido X) (2012)
- Overwhelmed and Annoyed Citizens
- Partido Ibérico
- Partido de los Autónomos Jubilados y Viudas
- Partido de culto al Fary

=== Communist parties ===
- Communist Party of Spain (PCE) (1921-present)
- Communist Unification of Spain (UCE) (1973–present)
- Spanish Communist Workers' Party (PCOE) (1973–present)
- La Aurora Marxist Organization (1974–present)
- Internationalist Socialist Workers' Party (POSI) (1980–present)
- Communist Party of the Peoples of Spain (PCPE) (1984–present)
- Anticapitalists (1995–present)
- Internationalist Struggle (LI) (1999–present)
- Corriente Roja (CR) (2002–present)
- Communist Party of Spain (Marxist–Leninist) (PCE (M–L)) (2006–present)
- Marxist–Leninist Party (Communist Reconstruction) (PML(RC)) (2014–present)
- Revolutionary Anticapitalist Left (IZAR) (2015–present)
- Workers' Revolutionary Current (CRT) (2017–present)
- Revolutionary Left (IR) (2017–present)
- Communist Party of the Workers of Spain (PCTE) (2019–present)

=== Leftist parties ===
- Workers' Front (2018–present)
- For a Fairer World (Por un Mundo Más Justo, PM+J) (2004–present)
- Zero Cuts (Recortes Cero) (2014–present)
- Republican Alternative (Alternativa Republicana) (2013–present)
- Humanist Party (Partido Humanista) (1984–present)
- Carlist Party (Partido Carlista) (1970–present)
- Iniciativa Socialista de Izquierdas
- Nueva Izquierda Verde
- Solidaridad y Autogestión Internacionalista (SAIn)

=== Progressive parties ===
- Animalist Party with the Environment (Partido Animalista Con el Medio Ambiente, PACMA) (2003–present)
- The Greens–Green Group (Los Verdes–Grupo Verde) (1994–present)
- Confederation of the Greens (Confederación de los Verdes) (1984–present)
- Cannabis Party (Partido Cannabis por la Legalización y la Normalización) (2003–present)
- The Eco-pacifist Greens (Los Verdes Ecopacifistas) (1988–present)
- Izquierda Española (2023–present)
- Alianza para el Desarrollo y la Naturaleza

=== Liberal parties ===
- Citizens - Party of the Citizenry (Ciudadanos-Partido de la Ciudadanía, CS) (2006–present)
- Libertarian Party (Partido Libertario) (2009–present)
- Volt Spain (2018–present)
- Foro Centro y Democracia (CYD)
- Democracia 21 (2026–present)

=== Conservative parties ===
- Partido Familia y Vida
- Comunión Tradicionalista Carlista (1986–present)

=== Nationalist parties ===
- Falange Española de las JONS (1976–present)
- Spanish Catholic Movement (1981–present)
- National Democracy (1995–present)
- National Workers' Party (Spain) (1999–present)
- España 2000 (2002–present)
- Authentic Phalanx (Falange Auténtica) (2002–present)
- Spanish Alternative (2003–present)
- National Alliance (2006–present)
- Party for Freedom (2013–present)
- National November (2026–present)

=== Regionalist parties ===
==== Andalusia ====
- Andalusian Left (1998–present)
- Andalusian Nation (1999–present)
- Andalusia by Itself (2016–present)
- Andalusi Party (2023–present)
- Partido Regionalista por Andalucía Oriental (PRAO) [es]

==== Asturias ====
- Partíu Asturianista (1985–present)
- Andecha Astur (1990–present)
- Asturian Left (1992–present)
- Asturian Renewal Union (1998–present)
- Bloc for Asturias (2003–present)
- Unidá (2007–present)
- Conceyu Abiertu (2011–present)
- Compromisu por Asturies (2011–present)

==== Baleric Islands ====
- El Pi-Proposal for the islands

==== Basque Country ====
- Zornotza Eginez (local)

==== Cantabria ====
- Cantabrian Nationalist Council (1995–present)

==== Castile and León ====
- Partido de El Bierzo (1979–present)
- Partido Regionalista del País Leonés (1980–present)
- Unidad Regionalista de Castilla y León (1992–present)
- Izquierda Castellana (2002–present)
- Agrupación de Electores Independientes Zamoranos
- Partido de Castilla y León (PCAL) [es]

==== Catalonia ====
- The Greens–Green Alternative (1999–present)
- Catalan Republic Party (2006–present)
- Pirate Party of Catalonia (2010–present)
- Catalan Solidarity for Independence (2010–present)
- National Front of Catalonia (2013–present)
- Som Catalans (2014–present)
- Communists of Catalonia (2014–present)
- Convergents (2017–present)
- We Are Alternative (2017–present)
- Democratic League (2019–present)
- Nationalist Party of Catalonia (2020–present)
- Alhora (2023–present)

==== Extremadura ====
- United Extremadura (1980–present)
- Extremaduran Coalition (1995–present)

==== Galicia ====
- Galician People's Front (1986–present)
- Land Party (Partido da Terra) (2011–present)
- Pirates of Galicia (2011–present)
- Commitment to Galicia (2012–present)

==== Madrid ====
- Municipalist Bench (Bancada municipalista) (2018–present)

==== Navarre ====
- Batzarre (1987–present)

=== Other parties ===
- Los Parados
- Nuevo Partido por la Democracia
- Partido Mutuo Apoyo Romántico
- National Bolshevik Party (Partido Nacional Bolquevique)
- Muerte al Sistema (+MAS+)
- SOMOS España
- Iustitia Europa (IE)

== National political formations of Spain ==
- People's Party (Partido Popular, PP) — mainstream centre-right party that is liberal conservative and Christian democratic, which conforms the largest group in the Congress and the Senate, and leads the parliamentary opposition. The People's Party originates from the People's Alliance (Alianza Popular, AP), which refounded in 1989. The party has governed from 1996 to 2004 and from 2011 to 2018.
- Spanish Socialist Workers' Party (Partido Socialista Obrero Español, PSOE) — mainstream centre-left social democratic party linked to General Union of Workers (Unión General de Trabajadores, UGT) trade union. The Socialists' Party of Catalonia (Partit dels Socialistes de Catalunya, PSC) acts as the party's instance in Catalonia. The party has governed from 1982 to 1996, from 2004 to 2011 and since 2018.
- Vox — a right-wing to far-right party that split from the PP in 2014; its main ideologies are social and national conservatism, economic liberalism and centralism (i.e. strong opposition to Spain's peripheral nationalisms). Vox opposes LGBT movements in Spain while endorsing anti-LGBT rhetoric abroad, rejects European federalism and defends narrowing the naturalisation of immigrant individuals of Maghrebi origin. It has allied to similar political parties from Latin America, the Italian Brothers of Italy and the Hungarian Fidesz.
- Sumar — a left-wing and progressive electoral platform established in 2022, constituted as an instrumental political party. It conforms an alliance of left-wing formations, some of them formerly comprising the Unidas Podemos and Más País political alliances, including nationwide United Left, Más Madrid, Greens Equo and regional Compromís, Chunta and Batzarre, among others. Like preceding Unidas Podemos, Sumar forms a coalition with governing PSOE.
- We can (Podemos) — a left-wing populist political party founded in 2014 in the aftermath of the 15-M Movement. It was in government as junior partner of the PSOE from 2020 to 2023, within the alliance Unidas Podemos.
- Citizens (Ciudadanos, Cs) — a centre-right liberal and pro-european party. It supports a high degree of political decentralization, but rejects autonomous communities' right to self-determination. Once the third-largest force in Congress, its popular support sharply declined in the November 2019 general election. The party didn't contest the latest general elections.

== Defunct parties ==
=== Defunct major parties ===
- Workers' Party of Marxist Unification (1935–1980)
- People's Socialist Party (1968–1978)
- People's Alliance (1976–1989)
  - Liberal Party, absorbed into the People's Party (1976–1989)
  - People's Democratic Party, absorbed into the People's Party (1982–1989)
- Union of the Democratic Centre (1977–1983)
- National Union (1979–1982)
- Democratic and Social Centre (1982–2006)
- Democratic Reformist Party (1983–1986)
- Workers' Party of Spain - Communist Unity (1985–1991)
- Ruiz-Mateos Group (1989–1995)
- Liberal Independent Group (1991–2007)
- Democratic Party of the New Left (1996-2001)
- Union, Progress and Democracy (2007–2020)

==== Andalusia ====
- Andalusian Party (1965–2015)
- R.I.S.A (2010-2019)

==== Aragon ====
- Upper Aragon in Common (2015-2023)
- Puyalón de Cuchas (2008–2026)

==== Basque Country ====
- Communist Movement of Euskadi (1966–1991)
- Euskadiko Ezkerra (1977–1993)
- Herri Batasuna (1978–2001)
  - Batasuna (2001–2013)
  - Euskal Herritarrok (1998–2003)
- Aralar (2000–2017)
- Amaiur (2011–2015)

==== Catalonia ====
- Unified Socialist Party of Catalonia (PSUC) (1936–1997)
- Union of the Centre and Christian Democracy of Catalonia (1976-1977)
- Democratic Convergence of Catalonia (1977-2016)
- Democratic Union of Catalonia (1977–2017)
- Convergence and Union (1978–2015)
- Initiative for Catalonia Greens (1987–2019)
- Agreement for Catalonia Progress (2000-2015)
- CORI (2003-2015)
- Catalan European Democratic Party (2016–2023)
- National Call for the Republic (2018–2020)
- Sobiranistes (2019–2023)

==== Ceuta ====
- Caballas Coalition (2011-2021)

==== Galicia ====
- En Marea (2015-2020)

==== Madrid ====
- Madrid Now (2015–2019)

==== Navarre ====
- Convergence of Democrats of Navarre (1995-2011)
- Nafarroa Bai (2004–2015)
- Sum Navarre (2019–2022)

==== Valencia ====
- Valencian People's Union (1982-1998)
- Valencian Union (1982–2014)
- Valencian Nationalist Bloc (1999–2021)
- Commitment for the Valencian Country (2006-2008)
- It is Time (2015-2016)
- The Valencian Way (2016)

=== Defunct minor parties ===
- Communist Organization of Spain (Red Flag) (1970-1994)
- Revolutionary Communist League (1971–1991)
- Communist Movement (1972–1991)
- Socialist Action Party (1972–2001)
- Communist Workers League (1973–1999)
- Spanish Democratic Socialist Party (1975-1978)
- People's Party (Spain, 1976) (1976-1977)
- Democratic Socialist Alliance (1976-1977)
- Spanish Social Reform (1976-1977)
- Federation of Democratic and Liberal Parties (1976-1978)
- Liberal Progressive Party (1976-1978)
- National Alliance July 18 (1977)
- Independent Spanish Phalanx (1977-2004)
- Liberal Citizens Action (1977-1979)
- Progressive Democratic Party (1978–1980)
- Unión Centrista Liberal (1978–2014)
- Workers' Socialist Party (1979-1993)
- Democratic Action Party (1981-1983)
- Liberal Democratic Party (1982–1984)
- Spanish Solidarity (1982–1984)
- Liberal Union (1983-1984)
- Progressive Federation (1984–1988)
- Communists' Unity Board (1986)
- Republican Popular Unity (1986–1987)
- National Front(1986-1993)
- The Ecologist Greens (1986-1994)
- Green List (1989)
- Alternative Left (1991–1993)
- Coalition for a New Socialist Party (1992-1996)
- Workers' Revolutionary Party (1994-2002)
- Forum (1991-1995)
- Alianza por la Unidad Nacional (1995–2005)
- The Greens of the Community of Madrid (1995–2011)
  - National Alliance
- Republican Coalition (1996)
- Spanish Democratic Party (1996–2008)
- Republican Social Movement (1999–2018)
- The Phalanx (1999–2024)
- Citizens for Blank Votes (2002–2022)
- Another Democracy is Possible (2003–2006)
- National Front (2006–2011)
- Liberal Democratic Centre (2006–2014)
- Pirate Party (2006–2022)
- Open Left (2012–2018)
- Building the Left–Socialist Alternative (2013-2018)
- Actúa (2017–2023)
- ADÑ–Spanish Identity (2018-2024)
- Hacer Nación (2020–2026)

==== Andalusia ====
- Socialist Alliance of Andalusia (1965-1976)
- Andalusian Social Liberal Party (1976-1978)
- Andalusian Liberation (1985-1989)
- Andalusian Progress Party (1993–1996)
- Socialist Party of Andalusia (2001–2011)
- Andalusian Convergence (2006–2013)

==== Asturias ====
- Asturian Nationalist Council (1979–1981)
- Ensame Nacionalista Astur (1982–1988)
- Asturian Nationalist Unity (1988–1992)

==== Balearic Islands ====
- Socialist Party of the Islands (1976-1977)
- Nationalist Left of the Balearic Islands Federation (1989-1998)

==== Basque Country ====
- Basque Nationalist Action (1930–2008)
- Zutik (1991–2011)
- Askatasuna (1998–2009)
- Communist Party of the Basque Homelands (2002–2008)
- Herritarren Zerrenda (2004)
- Demokrazia Hiru Milioi (2009)

==== Cantabria ====
- Cantabrian Unity (2002–2011)

==== Castile and León ====
- Nationalist Party of Castile and León (1977-2002)
- Commoners' Land (1988–2009)
- Union of the Salamancan People (2002–2014)
- Segoviemos (2015-2016)

==== Catalonia ====
- National Front of Catalonia (1940-1990)
- Socialist Party of National Liberation (1968-2015)
- Party of Labour of Catalonia (1969–1980)
- Catalan Workers' Left (1972-1981)
- Socialist Party of National Liberation - Provisional (1974-1979)
- Democratic Left of Catalonia (1975–1978)
- League of Catalonia–Catalan Liberal Party (1976–1977)
- Socialist Party of Catalonia–Regrouping (1976-1978)
- Catalan Centre (1976-1978)
- Social Democratic Party of Catalonia (1976–1988)
- Marxist Unification Movement(1976-1978)
- Communist Collective of Catalonia (1977-1979)
- Democratic Union–Broad Centre (1978–1979)
- Union of the Centre of Catalonia (1978–1981)
- Catalan Workers Bloc (1978-1982)
- Left Bloc for National Liberation (1979-1982)
- Left nationalists (1979–1984)
- Independentists of the Catalan Countries (1979-1985)
- Catalan Solidarity (1980)
- Party of the Communists of Catalonia (1982–2014)
- Movement for Defence of the Land (1984-2014)
- Agreement of Left Nationalists (1985-1987)
- Union of the Catalan Left (1986-1987)
- Party for Independence (1990-1999)
- The Greens–Ecologist Confederation of Catalonia (1994–2001)
- In Struggle (1994–2016)
- Citizens for Change (1999–2011)
- Platform for Catalonia (2002–2019)
- Catalan democracy (2010-2015)
- Catalonia Yes (2011-2021)
- New Catalan Left (2012–2014)
- Free (2016–2022)
- Nova (2019–2023)
- Braves (2019–2023)
- Centrem (2022–2023)

==== Extremadura ====
- Independent Socialists of Extremadura (1994–2018)

==== Galicia ====
- Galician Democratic Party (1976-1978)
- Partido Galeguista (1977–1984)
- Galician Coalition (1983–2012)
- Centrists of Galicia (1985–1991)
- Inzar (1991–2012)
- Nationalist Left (1992–2012)
- Primeira Linha (1998–2015)
- Nós–Unidade Popular (2001–2015)
- Convergence XXI (2009–2025)
- Cerna (2014-2018)

==== Madrid ====
- Recover Madrid (2021–2023)

==== Navarre ====
- Foral Democratic Union (1987–1991)

==== Valencia ====
- Communist Party of the Valencians (1987-1991)
- Nationalist Valencian Party (1990-2000)
- Valencian Coalition (2014-2011)
- The Greens–Ecologist Left of the Valencian Country (2004–2014)
- Gent de compromís (2013-2019)
- Valencian Democrats (2013–2024)

== Historical parties ==
=== Reign of Isabella II and the Sexenio Democrático ===
- Moderate Party (1834–1874)
- Progressive Party (1834–1874)
- Democratic Party (1849–1869)
- Liberal Union (1858–1874)
- Traditionalist Communion (1869–1937)
- Radical Democratic Party (1871–1880)
- Federal Democratic Republican Party (1868–1912)
- Constitutional Party (1872–1880)

=== Bourbon restoration ===
- Conservative Party (1876–1931)
- Liberal Party (1880–1931)
- Traditionalist Communion (1869–1937)
- Regionalist League of Catalonia (1901–1936)
- Republican Nationalist Federal Union (1910–1917)
- Republican–Socialist Conjunction (1909–1919)
- Maurist Party (1913–1930)
- Reformist Party (1912–1924)
- Radical Republican Party (1908–1936)
- Spanish Patriotic Union (1924–1930)

=== Second Spanish Republic ===
- National Front
  - Confederación Española de Derechas Autónomas (1933–1937)
    - Popular Action (1930–1933)
  - Spanish Agrarian Party (1934–1936)
  - Spanish Nationalist Party (1930–1936)
  - Spanish Renovation (1933–1937)
  - Traditionalist Communion (1869–1937)
- Popular Front
  - Republican Left (1934–1959)
  - Republican Union (1934–1958)
  - Syndicalist Party (1934–1976)
  - Workers' Party of Marxist Unification (1935–1980)
- Radical Republican Party (1908–1936)
- Falange Española de las JONS (1934–1937)
  - Falange Española (1933–1934)
  - Juntas de Ofensiva Nacional-Sindicalista (1931–1934)
- Regionalist League of Catalonia (1901–1936)
- Radical Socialist Republican Party (1929–1934)
- Liberal Republican Right (1930–1936)
- Republican Action (1925–1934)
- Conservative Republican Party (1932–1936)
- Party of the Democratic Centre (1936–1939)

=== Francoist Spain ===
During the period of the Francoist Regime from 1939 to 1977, Spain was a one-party state. That means that only one political party, the Falange Española Tradicionalista y de las Juntas de Ofensiva Nacional Sindicalista (FET y de las JONS), was legally allowed to hold power.

- Falange Española Tradicionalista y de las Juntas de Ofensiva Nacional Sindicalista (1937–1977)
  - Falange Española de las JONS (1934–1937)
  - Traditionalist Communion (1869–1937)

== See also ==
- Politics of Spain
- List of political parties by country
- List of political parties in Catalonia
- List of political parties in Galicia
- Liberalism and radicalism in Spain
- Republicanism in Spain
- Anarchism in Spain
- The far-right in Spain
- Federalism in Spain
