= List of Spanish flags =

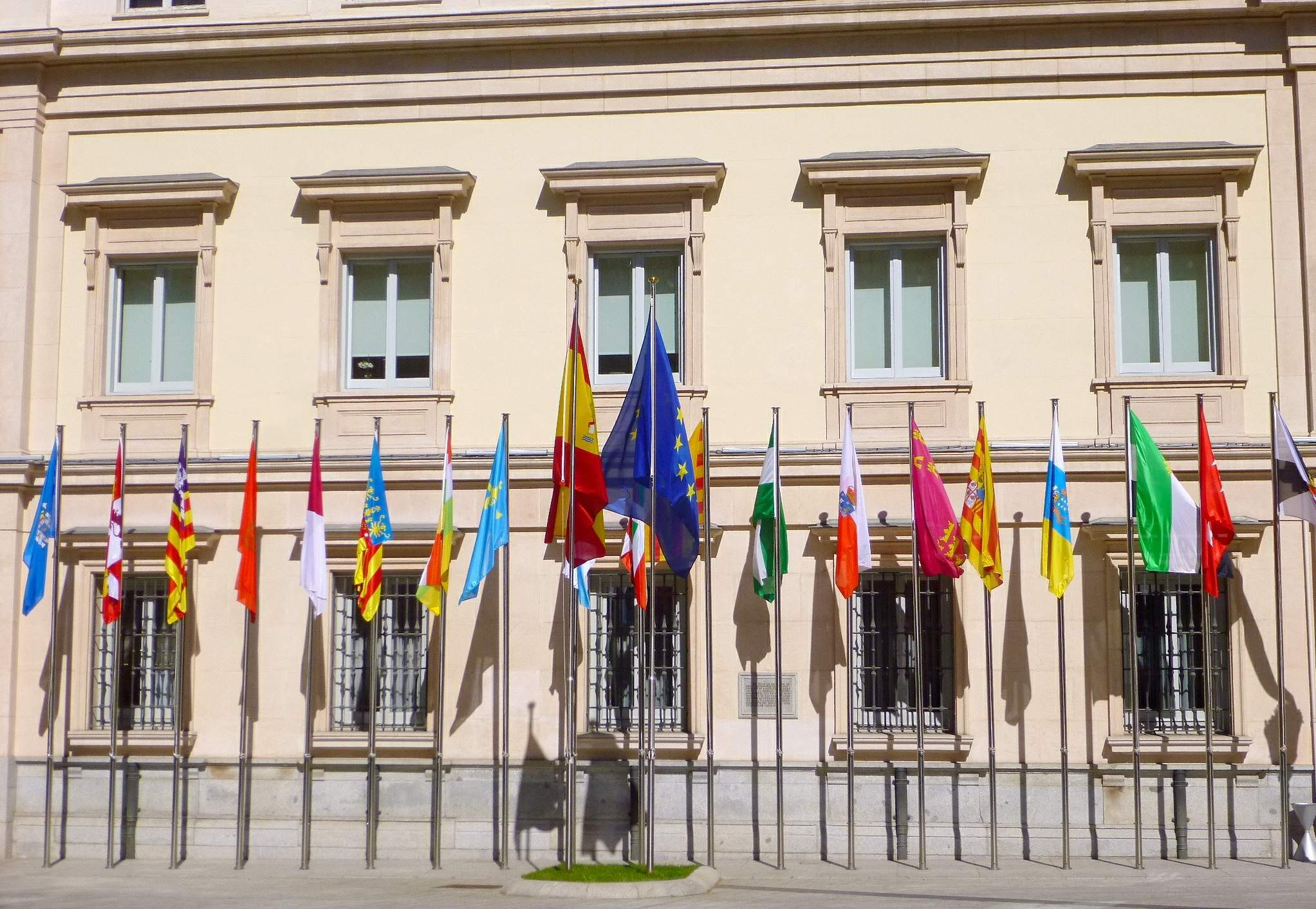
The state flag, European flag and subdivisions' flags in front of the Senate of Spain.

This is a list of Spanish flags, with illustrations.

== National flags ==
Flag	Date	Use	Description
	1981–present	National flag and ensign	The flag of Spain with the coat of arms centered at a point one third of the way from the hoist to the fly
	1843–1931; 1981–present Civil ensign for use in merchant ships 1 January 1928 to present	Civil flag and ensign	The flag of Spain consists of three horizontal stripes: red, yellow and red, the yellow strip being twice as wide as each red stripe. This kind of double-wide horizontal stripe is called a Spanish fess.
	1939–present	Naval jack	A square flag divided into four squares representing the four Kingdoms of Spain with navies in the Middle Ages: Castile (represented by a castle, top hoist), Leon (represented by a heraldic lion, top fly), Aragon (represented by the Senyera, bottom hoist), and Navarre (represented by an orle of chains, bottom fly)
	1982–present	High Civil Authorities' flag	A square flag of Spain with the Spanish coat of arms on the center
	1977–present	Yacht ensign	The flag of Spain with a blue plain Royal Crown in the center
	1977–present	Customs Service ensign	The flag of Spain with two crowned "H"

== Royal standards ==
Flag	Date	Use	Description
	2014–present	Standard of the King of Spain	A crimson square with the coat of arms of the King in the center. A version of the flag with gold fringing is known as the guidon and serves as the command sign or positional flag for military use.
	2015–present	Standard of the Princess of Asturias	A light blue square with the coat of arms of the Princess in the center. A version of the flag with gold fringing is known as the guidon and serves as the command sign or positional flag for military use.
	1975/ 1977–present (Legal regulation)	Standard of King Juan Carlos	A dark blue square with the coat of arms of King Juan Carlos in the center. A version of the flag with gold fringing is known as the guidon and serves as the command sign or positional flag for military use.

== Military flags ==
=== Armed Forces ===
Flag	Date	Use	Description
	?–present	Flag of the Chief of the Defence Staff	
	?–present	Flag of Captain Generals of the Army, Navy, or Air Force	

=== Army ===
Flag	Date	Use	Description
	?–present	Flag for vessels belonging to the Spanish Army	
	?–present	Flag of a Spanish Military Unit	
	?–present	Flag of the Chief of Staff of the Army	
	?–present	Flag of a captain general	
		Flag of an Army general	
	?–present	Flag of a lieutenant general	
	?–present	Flag of a divisional general	
	?–present	Flag of a brigadier general	
	?–present	Flag of a colonel	

=== Navy ===
Flag	Date	Use	Description
	?–present	Naval ensign	
	?–present	Naval jack	
	?–present	Flag of the Chief of Staff of the Navy	
	?–present	Flag of captain general of the Navy	
	?–present	Flag of admiral	
	?–present	Flag of vice admiral	
	?–present	Flag of counter admiral	
	?–present	Pennant of the frigate captain	
	?–present	Pennant of the sea captain	
	?–present	Flag of bay chief	

=== Air Force ===
Flag	Date	Use	Description
	?–present	Flag of Spanish Air and Space Force	
	?–present	Flag of Chief of Staff of the Air and Space Force	
	?–present	Flag of Captain General of the Air Force	
	?–present	Flag of the lieutenant general	
	?–present	Flag of the major general	
	?–present	Flag of the brigadier general	
	?–present	Flag of the colonel	

== Regional flags ==
Flag	Date	Use	Description
		Flag of Andalusia (the Arbonaida)	Three equal horizontal bands of green (top), white, and green, with an Andalucian coat of arms in center of the white band.
		Flag of Aragon	Nine equal horizontal stripes of yellow (top) and red. Towards the hoist there is an Aragon coat of arms. It has a gold crown having four small green diamonds and three small red disks; its shield has four quarters, the first quarter is a gold field with a red cross on a tree, the second quarter is a blue field with a white Cross of Íñigo Arista in the top hoist-side corner, the third quarter is a red St. George Cross flag with a Moor's head in each quarter, in the fourth quarter are nine equal vertical bands of yellow and red.
		Flag of Asturias	Blue field with the Victory Cross shifted towards the hoist. Hanging from the arms of the cross are an upper-case Greek letter alpha (Α) on the left and a lower-case omega (ω) on the right.
		Flag of the Balearic Islands	Nine equal horizontal stripes of yellow (top) and red, and a white five-towered castle on a purple field in the canton.
		Flag of the Basque Country (the Ikurriña)	The red background symbolizes Biscayan people (the race); the green saltire represents the Oak of Guernica, a symbol of the old Basque laws, or Fueros; and the white cross over them as a symbol of Basque Catholic devotion.
		Flag of the Canary Islands	Three equal vertical bands of white (hoist), blue, and yellow. On the state flag, the Canary Island coat of arms is in the center of the blue band. The coat of arms features the motto "OCEANO" in a silver ribbon in upper, royal crown in middle, and two dogs holding a blue shield with seven white islands in lower.
		Flag of Cantabria	Two horizontal stripes of equal width, white over red, and the region's coat of arms in its centre. The first field of the coat of arms represents the conquest of Seville by Cantabrian marines in 1248 (with the ship breaking the chains that blocked the way through the river Guadalquivir), while the second field honors the pre-Roman Cantabri people showing geometric ornaments typically found on Cantabrian stelae.
		Flag of Castilla-La Mancha	
		Flag of Castile and León	Two lions from the Kingdom of León and two castles from Kingdom of Castille.
		Flag of Catalonia (the Senyera)	
		Flag of Ceuta	
		Flag of Extremadura	
		Flag of Galicia	
		Flag of La Rioja	
		Flag of Madrid	A crimson field representing Castille, with seven five-pointed stars in silver (placed four and three in the centre) representing the administrative areas of the region.
		Flag of Melilla	
		Flag of Murcia	
		Flag of Navarre	Against a red background, the coat of arms of Navarre, which consists of a pattern of golden chains, with eight of them linked with an emerald in the center (based on the banner of the ancient Kingdom of Navarre)
		Flag of the Valencian Community (the Reial Senyera)	A derivation of the traditional Senyera of the Crown of Aragon, it is composed of four red bars on a yellow background, crowned with a blue strip party per pale next to the hoist.

== Provincial flags ==
The provinces of A Coruña, Alicante, Castellón, Valencia and Zamora do not have a flag.

Álava

Albacete

Alicante (no flag)

Almería

Asturias

Ávila

Badajoz

Balearic Islands

Barcelona

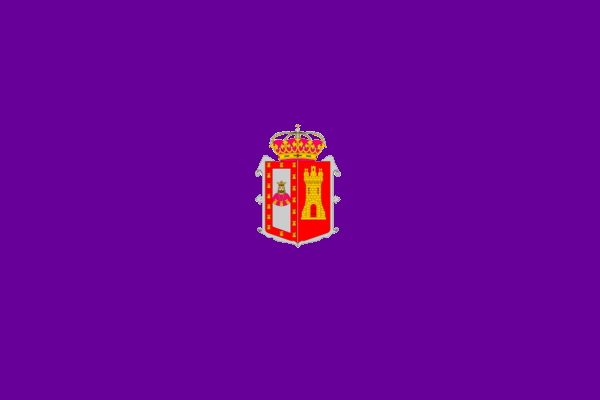
Burgos

Cáceres

Cádiz

Cantabria

Castellón (no flag)

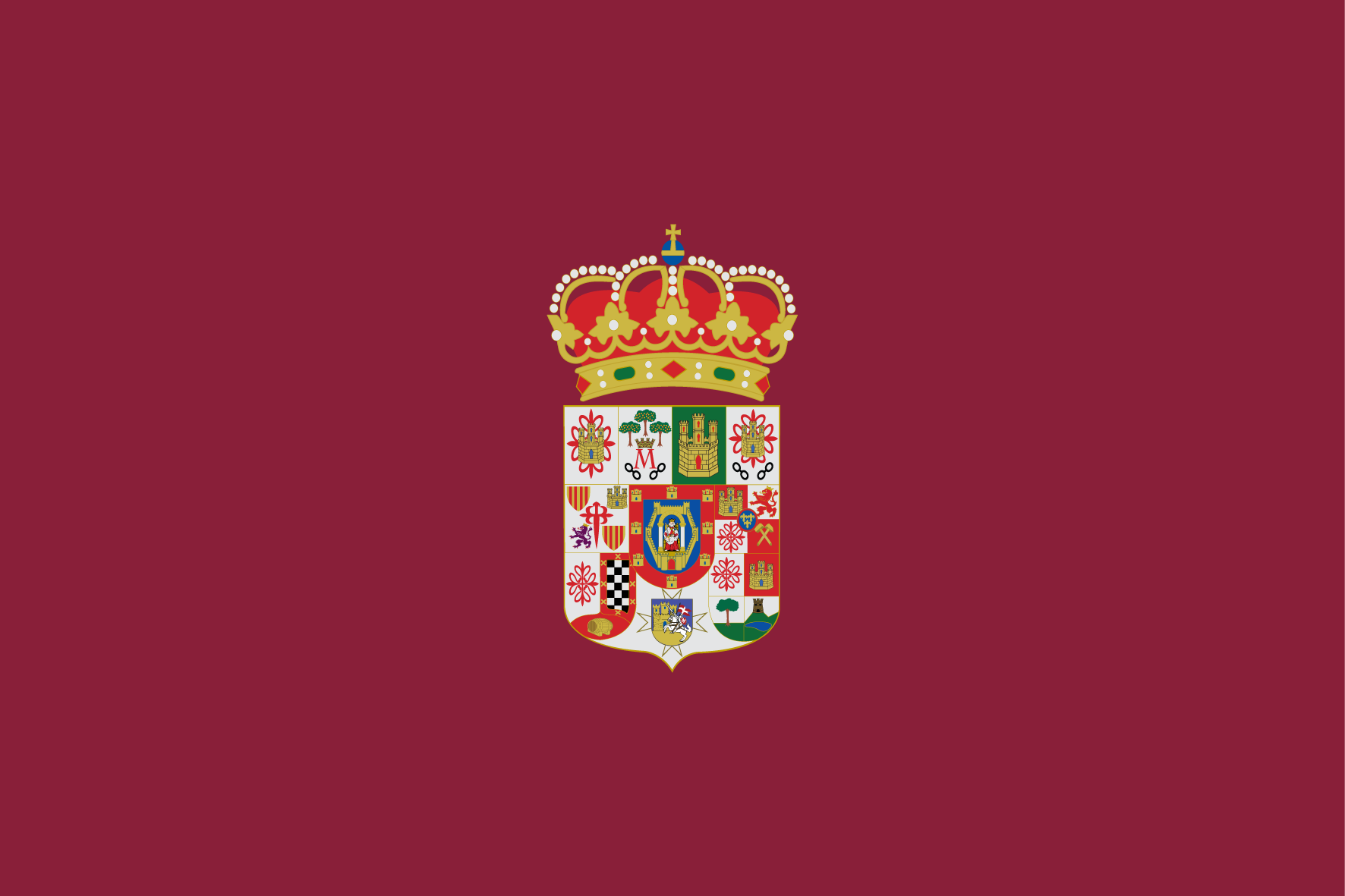
Ciudad Real

Córdoba

A Coruña (no flag)

Cuenca

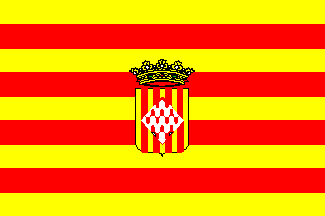
Girona

Granada

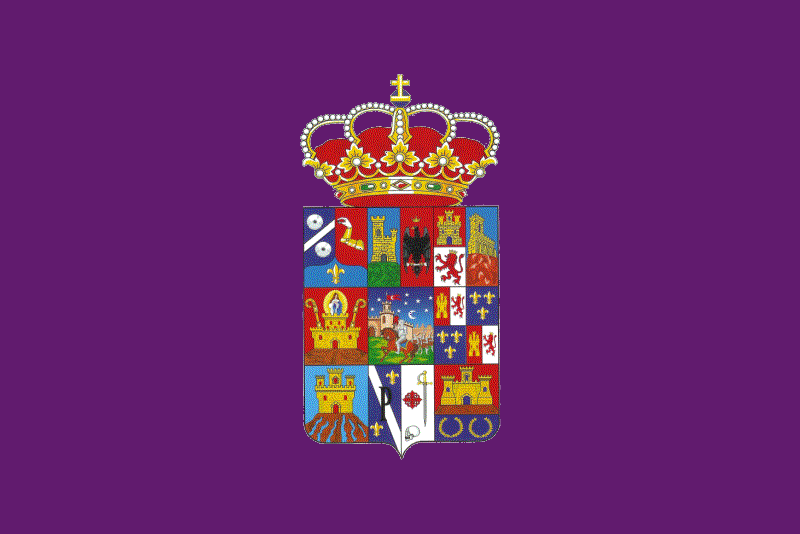
Guadalajara

Guipúzcoa

Huelva

Huesca

Jaén

La Rioja

León

Lleida

Lugo

Madrid

Málaga

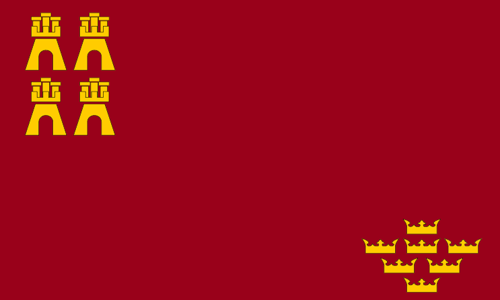
Murcia

Navarre

Ourense

Palencia

Las Palmas

Pontevedra

Salamanca

Santa Cruz de Tenerife

Segovia

Sevilla

Soria

Tarragona

Teruel

Toledo

Valladolid

Valencia (unofficial)

Vizcaya

Zamora

Zaragoza

== Islands ==
=== Balearic Islands ===
Ibiza

Mallorca

Flag of Menorca

Formentera

=== Canary Islands ===
Fuerteventura

Gran Canaria

La Gomera

El Hierro

Lanzarote

La Palma

Tenerife

== Historical flags ==
=== Spain ===
See also: Flag of Spain

Flag	Date	Use	Description
	1475–1506; Eventually until 1506	Flag of the infantry forces and flag of Spain until 1506	
	1506–1701	Military flag, also used as flag of the Spanish Empire and its overseas territories	The Cross of Burgundy: A red saltire resembling two crossed, roughly-pruned (knotted) branches, on a white field
	1506–1762	Merchant marine's flag	
	1701–1771	Flag used in naval bases and coast defenses	
	1701–1785	Naval ensign	
	1701–1760	Flag of the Spanish Empire	
	1760–1785	Flag of the Spanish Empire	
	1808–1813	Flag of Spain under Joseph Bonaparte (1808–1813)	
	1785–1927	Merchant marine's flag (1785–1927)	
	1785–1843	War ensign	
	1785–1808	State flag	
	1813–1873	State flag	
	1875–1931	State flag	
	1873–1874	Flag of the First Spanish Republic	
	1931–1939	Flag of the Second Spanish Republic	
	1931–1939	Civil flag and ensign of the Second Spanish Republic	
	1936–1938	Flag of Spain (Nationalist faction)	
	1936–1938	Civil flag and ensign of the Nationalist faction	
	1938–1945	Flag of Spain (Spain under Franco's Rule until his death in 1975, and the transition back to democracy under the monarchy)	
	1945–1977	Flag of Spain (Spain under Franco's Rule until his death in 1975, and the transition back to democracy under the monarchy)	
	1977–1981	Flag of Spain (Spain under Franco's Rule until his death in 1975, and the transition back to democracy under the monarchy)	

=== Kingdom of Asturias ===
Flag	Date	Use	Description
	842–850	Royal standard of Ramiro I of Asturias	

=== Kingdom of Castile ===
Flag	Date	Use	Description
	1175–1214	Royal standard of the Kingdom of Castile	
	1214–1230	Royal standard of the Kingdom of Castile	

=== Kingdom of León ===
Flag	Date	Use	Description
	1105–1157	Royal flag of Alfonso VII of León and Castile	
	1157–1284	Royal flag of the Kingdom of León	
	1284–1833	Royal flag of the Kingdom of León	

=== Kingdom of Galicia ===
Flag	Date	Use	Description
	circa. 1282	Flag of the Kingdom of Galicia	
	16th century	Flag of the Kingdom of Galicia	

=== Granada ===
Flag	Date	Use	Description
	1230–1492	Flag of the Emirate of Granada	
	1492–1833	Flag of the Kingdom of Granada	

=== Kingdom of Toledo ===
Flag	Date	Use	Description
	1085–1833	Banner of the Kingdom of Toledo	

=== Kingdom of Mallorca ===
Flag	Date	Use	Description
	1269–1312	Flag of the Kingdom of Mallorca	
	1312–1715	Flag of the Kingdom of Mallorca	

=== Kingdom of Murcia ===
Flag	Date	Use	Description
	1266	First standard of the Kingdom of Murcia	
	1266–1361	Second standard of the Kingdom of Murcia	
	1361	Third standard of the Kingdom of Murcia	
	1361–1575	Final standard of the Kingdom of Murcia	

=== Kingdom of Navarre ===
Flag	Date	Use	Description
	1194–1234	Royal flag of Sancho VII of Navarre	
	1212–1589	Royal standard of the Kings of Navarre	
	1589–1841	Royal standard of the Kings of Navarre	

=== Crown of Castile ===
Flag	Date	Use	Description
	1230–1406	Royal standard of the Crown of Castile	
	1406–1500	Royal standard of the Crown of Castile	
	1406–1500	Royal standard of the Crown of Castile (square shape)	
	1500–1715	Royal standard of the Crown of Castile	

=== Crown of Aragon ===
Flag	Date	Use	Description
	1162–1716	Royal standard of the Crown of Aragon	
	1238–1276	The Pennon of the Conquest of Valencia.	

=== Historical royal standards ===
See: Royal Standard of Spain

==== Royal banners of arms ====
Flag	Date	Use	Description
	1475–1492	Banner of arms of the Catholic Monarchs	
	1492–1504	Banner of arms of the Catholic Monarchs	
	1518–1556	Banner of arms of King Charles I	
	1580–1668	Banner of arms of the House of Austria (with the arms of Portugal)	
	1668–1700	Banner of arms of the House of Austria (from 1668)	
	1700–1761	Banner of arms of the House of Bourbon	
	1761–1868	Banner of arms of the House of Bourbon	
	1875–1931	Banner of arms of the House of Bourbon	
	1931	Banner of arms of King Alfonso XIII	

==== Royal standards (common use) ====
Flag	Date	Use	Description
	1475–1492	Common Royal banner of the Catholic Monarchs (Until 1492)	
	1475–1492	Royal standard or Royal flag of the Catholic Monarchs	
	1492–1508	Royal standard or Royal flag of the Catholic Monarchs	
	1556–1580	Royal standard or Royal flag of the House of Habsburg.	
	1668–1700	Royal standard or Royal flag of the House of Habsburg.	
	1580–1668	Royal standard or Royal flag of the House of Habsburg.	(Inescutcheon of Portugal in the Royal arms)
	1700–1761	Royal standard or Royal flag of the House of Bourbon. The banner includes the collar of the Spanish Order of the Golden Fleece and the blue ribbon of the Bourbon French Order of the Holy Spirit.	
	1761–1838	Royal standard or Royal flag of the House of Bourbon.	
	1838–1868	Royal standard or Royal flag of the House of Bourbon.	
	1875–1931	Royal standard or Royal flag of the House of Bourbon.	
	1975/ 1977–2014 (Legal regulation)	Royal standard or Royal flag of King Juan Carlos I. Still in use as King Juan Carlos' personal ensign.	
	2014 – present	Royal standard or Royal flag of King Felipe VI	

==== Royal Guidons ====
See: Guidon (heraldic flag)

Flag	Date	Use	Description
	c.1475–1508	Castilian guidon of the Catholic Monarch	
	c.1518–1556	Castilian guidon of Charles I	
	c.1580–1598	Royal guidon of Philip II	
	c.1920–1931	Royal guidon of Alfonso XIII.	

==== Standards of heads of state ====
Flag	Date	Use	Description
	1931–1936	Presidential standard of Niceto Alcala Zamora	
	1936–1939	Presidential standard of Manuel Azaña	
	1940–1975	Standard of Francisco Franco.	

==== Members of the royal family ====
Flag	Date	Use	Description
	1893–1931	Standard or flag of Spanish Infantes	A purple swallowtail flag with the royal arms in the center.
	1971–1975	Standard of Juan Carlos, Prince of Spain	A dark blue square with the coat of arms of Juan Carlos as Prince in the center.
	2001–2014	Standard of Felipe, Prince of Asturias	A light blue square with the coat of arms of the Prince in the center.

== Political flags ==
Flag	Date	Party	Description
	?–present	Vox	
	?–present	Leonese People's Union	
	?–present	Popular Unity Candidacy	
		Catalan Workers' Left	
	?–present	Marxist–Leninist Party (Communist Reconstruction)	
	?–present	Communist Party of Spain (Marxist–Leninist)	
	?–present	Spanish Communist Workers' Party (1973)	
	?–present	Republican Alternative (Spain)	
Link to file		National Democracy (Spain)	
	1976–present	Falange Española de las JONS (1976)	
	1999–2024	La Falange (1999)	
	1977–2004	Falange Española Independiente	
	1937–1977	FET y de las JONS	
	1934–1937	Falange Española de las JONS	
	2023–present	Andalusi Party	
		Andalusian Nation	
		Andalusian Left	
		Andecha Astur	
	?–1988	Ensame Nacionalista Astur	
	?–1992	Asturian Nationalist Unity	
		Castilian Left	
	?–2001	Herri Batasuna	
Link to file	?–2015	Andalusian Party	
		People's Alliance (Spain)	
		POUM	
		National Front (Spain, 2006)	
		Republican Social Movement	
		Andalusian Liberation	
		Socialist Alliance of Andalusia	
		Asturian Nationalist Council	
		Basque Nationalist Action	
		Party of the Communists of Catalonia	
	?–1970s	Socialist Party of National Liberation	
		Juntas de Ofensiva Nacional-Sindicalista	
		Syndicalist Party	
		Popular Front (Spain)	
		Spanish Renovation	
		CEDA	

== See also ==
- Flags of the autonomous communities of Spain
- Coats of arms of the autonomous communities of Spain
- List of provincial flags of Spain
- List of coats of arms of Spain

== Sources ==
- The Flags of Spain. Flags of the World
- The history of the flag. Spanish Navy Web
- (in Spanish)The Spanish Royal Decree 1511/1977
- (in Spanish) Royal and Governmental Standards of Spain (Images). Web of Luis Miguel Arias
- https://www.youtube.com/watch?v=ueu5yohTBek
