= Asturias (Congress of Deputies constituency) =

Electoral constituency in Spain

Coordinates: 43°20′N 6°00′W

- Congress of Deputies; Electoral constituency
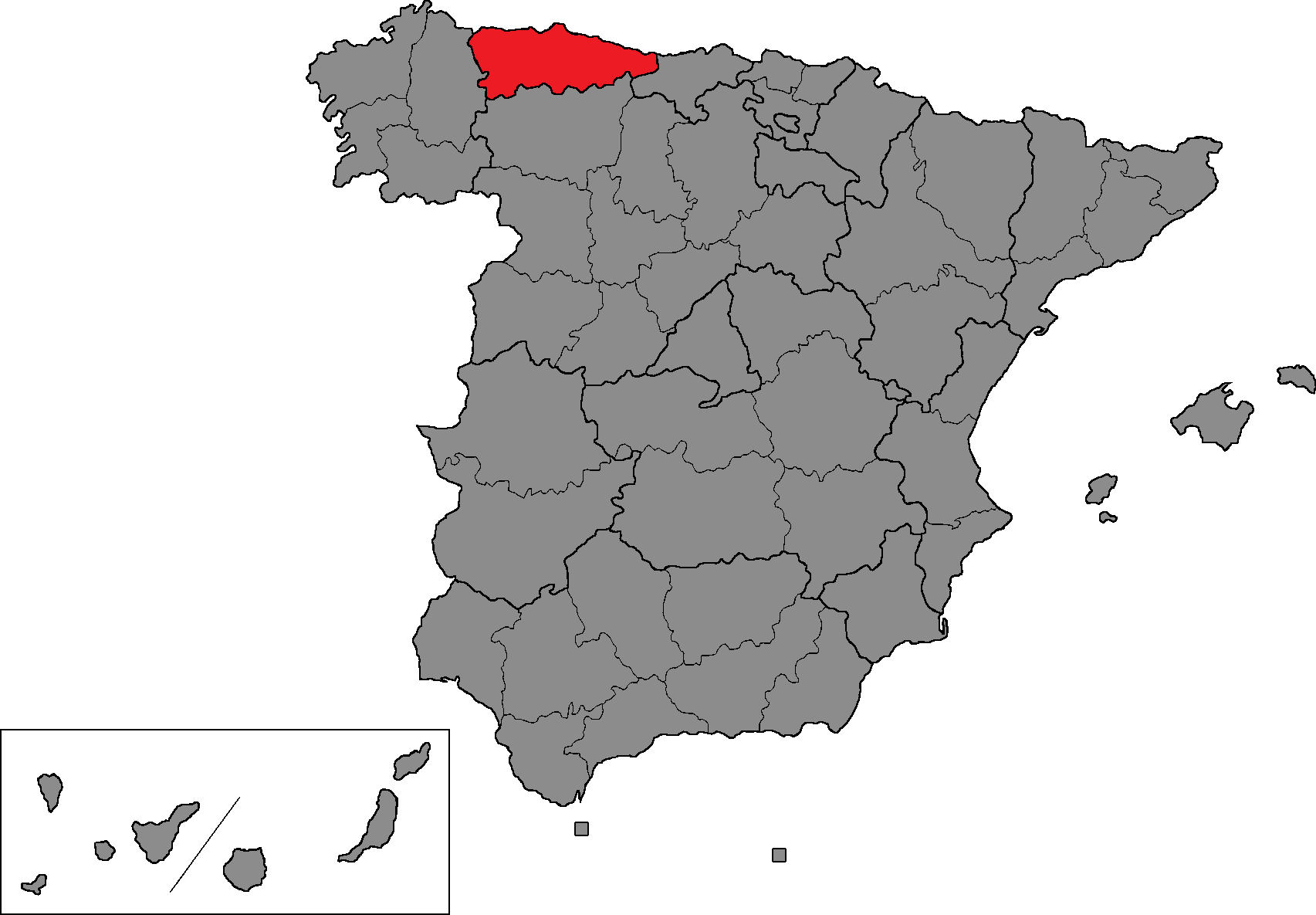
- Location of Asturias within Spain
- Province: Asturias
- Autonomous community: Principality of Asturias
- Population: ▲1,008,028 (2024)
- Electorate: ▼959,023 (2023)
- Major settlements: Gijón, Oviedo, Avilés, Siero, Langreo, Mieres

Current constituency
- Created: 1977
- Seats: 10 (1977–1986); 9 (1986–2004); 8 (2004–2019); 7 (2019–present)
- Members: PP (3); PSOE (2); Sumar (1); Vox (1)

Asturias—Oviedo until 1986—is one of the 52 constituencies represented in the Congress of Deputies, the lower chamber of the Spanish parliament, the Cortes Generales. The constituency (whose boundaries correspond to those of the homonymous province) currently elects eight deputies. The electoral system uses the D'Hondt method and closed-list proportional voting, with a minimum threshold of three percent.

== Electoral system ==
The constituency was created as per the Political Reform Law and was first contested in the 1977 general election. The Law provided for the provinces of Spain to be established as multi-member districts in the Congress of Deputies, with this regulation being maintained under the Spanish Constitution of 1978. Additionally, the Constitution requires for any modification of the provincial limits to be approved under an organic law, needing an absolute majority in the Cortes Generales.

Voting is based on universal suffrage, comprising all Spanish nationals over 18 years of age with full political rights, provided that they have not been deprived of the right to vote by a final sentence. The only exception was in 1977, when this was limited to nationals over 21 years of age and in full enjoyment of their political and civil rights. Amendments in 2011 required non-resident citizens to apply for voting, a system known as "begged" voting (Spanish: Voto rogado). which was abolished in 2022. Further, amendments in 2018 granted the right to vote to those legally incapacitated. The Congress of Deputies has a minimum of 300 and a maximum of 400 seats, with electoral provisions fixing its size at 350. Of these, 348 are elected in 50 multi-member constituencies corresponding to the provinces of Spain—each of which is assigned an initial minimum of two seats and the remaining 248 distributed in proportion to population—using the D'Hondt method and closed-list proportional voting, with a three percent-threshold of valid votes (including blank ballots) in each constituency. The remaining two seats are allocated to Ceuta and Melilla as single-member districts elected by plurality voting. The use of this electoral method may result in a higher effective threshold depending on district magnitude and vote distribution. The law does not provide for by-elections to fill vacant seats; instead, any vacancies arising after the proclamation of candidates and during the legislative term are filled by the next candidates on the party lists or, when required, by designated substitutes.

The electoral law allows for parties and federations registered in the interior ministry, alliances and groupings of electors to present lists of candidates. Parties and federations intending to form an alliance are required to inform the relevant electoral commission within 10 days of the election call—15 before 1985—whereas groupings of electors need to secure the signature of at least one percent of the electorate in the constituencies for which they seek election—one permille of the electorate, with a compulsory minimum of 500 signatures, until 1985—disallowing electors from signing for more than one list. Also since 2011, parties, federations or alliances that have not obtained a mandate in either chamber of the Cortes at the preceding election are required to secure the signature of at least 0.1 percent of electors in the aforementioned constituencies. Amendments in 2007 required a balanced composition of men and women in the electoral lists, so that candidates of either sex made up at least 40 percent of the total composition; further amendments in 2024 required the use of a zipper system.

== Deputies ==
Deputies 1977–present
Key to parties PCE IU U.Podemos Podemos Sumar PSOE CDS Cs UCD PP CP CD AP FAC Vox
Legislature	Election	Distribution
Constituent	1977	1 / 4 / 4 / 1
1st	1979	1 / 4 / 4 / 1
2nd	1982	1 / 6 / 3
3rd	1986	1 / 5 / 1 / 2
4th	1989	1 / 4 / 1 / 3
5th	1993	1 / 4 / 4
6th	1996	1 / 4 / 4
7th	2000	1 / 3 / 5
8th	2004	4 / 4
9th	2008	4 / 4
10th	2011	1 / 3 / 3 / 1
11th	2015	2 / 2 / 1 / 3
12th	2016	2 / 2 / 1 / 3
13th	2019 (Apr)	1 / 3 / 1 / 1 / 1
14th	2019 (Nov)	1 / 3 / 2 / 1
15th	2023	1 / 2 / 3 / 1

== General elections ==
=== 2026 ===
Summary of the 29 November 2026 Congress of Deputies election results in Asturias
Parties and alliances	Popular vote			Seats	
Parties and alliances	Votes	%	±pp	Total	+/−
People's Party (PP)					
Spanish Socialist Workers' Party (PSOE)					
Vox (Vox)					
Broad Front for Asturias (FA)^{1}			n/a		
We Can (Podemos)^{1}			n/a		
Animalist Party with the Environment (PACMA)					
Communist Party of the Workers of Spain (PCTE)					
Workers' Front (FO)					
For a Fairer World (M+J)					
State of Spain Unionist Party (PUEDE)					
The Party is Over (SALF)			New		
Blank ballots					
Total				7	±0
Valid votes					
Invalid votes					
Votes cast / turnout					
Abstentions					
Registered voters	979,077				
Sources
Footnotes: ^{1} Within the Unite alliance in the 2023 election.

=== 2023 ===
Summary of the 23 July 2023 Congress of Deputies election results in Asturias
Parties and alliances	Popular vote			Seats	
Parties and alliances	Votes	%	±pp	Total	+/−
People's Party (PP)	212,816	35.65	+12.43	3	+1
Spanish Socialist Workers' Party (PSOE)	205,049	34.34	+1.07	2	–1
Unite (Sumar)^{1}	88,630	14.85	–3.37	1	±0
Vox (Vox)	74,571	12.49	–3.37	1	±0
Animalist Party with the Environment (PACMA)^{2}	3,167	0.53	–0.26	0	±0
Asturias Exists–Empty Spain (Asturias Existe EV)	2,314	0.39	New	0	±0
Communist Party of the Workers of Spain (PCTE)	1,598	0.27	+0.12	0	±0
Workers' Front (FO)	1,176	0.20	New	0	±0
For a Fairer World (PUM+J)	773	0.13	+0.04	0	±0
Zero Cuts (Recortes Cero)	590	0.10	–0.03	0	±0
State of Spain Unionist Party (PUEDE)	269	0.05	New	0	±0
Blank ballots	6,079	1.02	–0.24		
Total	597,032			7	±0
Valid votes	597,032	98.98	–0.05		
Invalid votes	6,151	1.02	+0.05		
Votes cast / turnout	603,183	62.90	+4.78		
Abstentions	355,840	37.10	–4.78		
Registered voters	959,023				
Sources
Footnotes: ^{1} Unite results are compared to the combined totals of United We Can and More Country–Equo in the November 2019 election.; ^{2} Animalist Party with the Environment results are compared to Animalist Party Against Mistreatment of Animals totals in the November 2019 election.

=== November 2019 ===
Summary of the 10 November 2019 Congress of Deputies election results in Asturias
Parties and alliances	Popular vote			Seats	
Parties and alliances	Votes	%	±pp	Total	+/−
Spanish Socialist Workers' Party (PSOE)	186,211	33.27	+0.14	3	±0
People's Party–Forum (PP–Foro)	129,945	23.22	+5.32	2	+1
United We Can (Podemos–IX)	89,301	15.95	–1.19	1	±0
Vox (Vox)	88,788	15.86	+4.37	1	±0
Citizens–Party of the Citizenry (Cs)	37,374	6.68	–10.03	0	–1
More Country–Equo (Más País–Equo)	12,732	2.27	New	0	±0
Animalist Party Against Mistreatment of Animals (PACMA)	4,412	0.79	–0.27	0	±0
Andecha Astur (Andecha)	887	0.16	+0.01	0	±0
Communist Party of the Workers of Spain (PCTE)	843	0.15	–0.07	0	±0
Zero Cuts–Green Group (Recortes Cero–GV)	732	0.13	–0.05	0	±0
Communist Party of the Peoples of Spain (PCPE)	626	0.11	New	0	±0
For a Fairer World (PUM+J)	487	0.09	–0.03	0	±0
Humanist Party (PH)	366	0.07	–0.01	0	±0
Blank ballots	7,041	1.26	+0.17		
Total	559,745			7	±0
Valid votes	559,745	99.03	+0.13		
Invalid votes	5,486	0.97	–0.13		
Votes cast / turnout	565,231	58.12	–6.90		
Abstentions	407,349	41.88	+6.90		
Registered voters	972,580				

=== April 2019 ===
Summary of the 28 April 2019 Congress of Deputies election results in Asturias
Parties and alliances	Popular vote			Seats	
Parties and alliances	Votes	%	±pp	Total	+/−
Spanish Socialist Workers' Party (PSOE)	207,586	33.13	+8.26	3	+1
People's Party–Forum (PP–Foro)	112,180	17.90	–17.35	1	–2
United We Can (Podemos–IX–Equo)	107,426	17.14	–6.71	1	–1
Citizens–Party of the Citizenry (Cs)	104,688	16.71	+4.11	1	±0
Vox (Vox)	72,018	11.49	+11.25	1	+1
Animalist Party Against Mistreatment of Animals (PACMA)	6,670	1.06	–0.02	0	±0
Act (PACT)	4,554	0.73	New	0	±0
Communist Party of the Workers of Spain (PCTE)	1,359	0.22	New	0	±0
Zero Cuts–Green Group (Recortes Cero–GV)	1,133	0.18	±0.00	0	±0
Andecha Astur (Andecha Astur)	932	0.15	New	0	±0
For a Fairer World (PUM+J)	777	0.12	New	0	±0
Humanist Party (PH)	480	0.08	+0.01	0	±0
Blank ballots	6,858	1.09	+0.19		
Total	626,661			7	–1
Valid votes	626,661	98.90	–0.14		
Invalid votes	6,940	1.10	+0.14		
Votes cast / turnout	633,601	65.02	+3.93		
Abstentions	340,890	34.98	–3.93		
Registered voters	974,491				

=== 2016 ===
Summary of the 26 June 2016 Congress of Deputies election results in Asturias
Parties and alliances	Popular vote			Seats	
Parties and alliances	Votes	%	±pp	Total	+/−
People's Party–Forum (PP–Foro)	209,632	35.25	+5.14	3	±0
Spanish Socialist Workers' Party (PSOE)	147,920	24.87	+1.58	2	±0
United We Can (Podemos–IU–Equo–IAS–CLI–AS)^{1}	141,845	23.85	–5.94	2	±0
Citizens–Party of the Citizenry (C's)	74,961	12.60	–0.96	1	±0
Animalist Party Against Mistreatment of Animals (PACMA)	6,398	1.08	+0.35	0	±0
Blank Seats (EB)	2,517	0.42	+0.12	0	±0
Vox (Vox)	1,442	0.24	–0.04	0	±0
Union, Progress and Democracy (UPyD)	1,391	0.23	–0.39	0	±0
Communist Party of the Peoples of Spain (PCPE)	1,383	0.23	+0.03	0	±0
Zero Cuts–Green Group (Recortes Cero–GV)	1,086	0.18	+0.01	0	±0
Humanist Party (PH)	414	0.07	+0.01	0	±0
State of Spain Unionist Party (PUEDE)	336	0.06	New	0	±0
Blank ballots	5,374	0.90	±0.00		
Total	594,699			8	±0
Valid votes	594,699	99.04	–0.13		
Invalid votes	5,764	0.96	+0.13		
Votes cast / turnout	600,463	61.09	–2.68		
Abstentions	382,374	38.91	+2.68		
Registered voters	982,837				
Sources
Footnotes: ^{1} United We Can results are compared to the combined totals of We Can and United Left–Popular Unity in Common–Asturian Left in the 2015 election.

=== 2015 ===
Summary of the 20 December 2015 Congress of Deputies election results in Asturias
Parties and alliances	Popular vote			Seats	
Parties and alliances	Votes	%	±pp	Total	+/−
People's Party–Forum (PP–Foro)^{1}	187,568	30.11	–19.97	3	–1
Spanish Socialist Workers' Party (PSOE)	145,113	23.29	–6.05	2	–1
We Can (Podemos)	132,984	21.35	New	2	+2
Citizens–Party of the Citizenry (C's)	84,464	13.56	New	1	+1
United Left–Popular Unity in Common–Asturian Left (IU–UPeC–IAS)	52,583	8.44	–4.80	0	–1
Animalist Party Against Mistreatment of Animals (PACMA)	4,555	0.73	+0.39	0	±0
Union, Progress and Democracy (UPyD)	3,855	0.62	–3.29	0	±0
Blank Seats (EB)	1,869	0.30	–0.10	0	±0
Vox (Vox)	1,715	0.28	New	0	±0
Communist Party of the Peoples of Spain (PCPE)	1,240	0.20	+0.01	0	±0
Zero Cuts–Green Group (Recortes Cero–GV)	1,038	0.17	New	0	±0
Humanist Party (PH)	392	0.06	+0.02	0	±0
Blank ballots	5,591	0.90	–0.43		
Total	622,967			8	±0
Valid votes	622,967	99.17	+0.14		
Invalid votes	5,233	0.83	–0.14		
Votes cast / turnout	628,200	63.77	–0.80		
Abstentions	356,887	36.23	+0.80		
Registered voters	985,087				
Sources
Footnotes: ^{1} People's Party–Forum results are compared to the combined totals of People's Party and Forum of Citizens in the 2011 election.

=== 2011 ===
Summary of the 20 November 2011 Congress of Deputies election results in Asturias
Parties and alliances	Popular vote			Seats	
Parties and alliances	Votes	%	±pp	Total	+/−
People's Party (PP)	223,906	35.40	–6.18	3	–1
Spanish Socialist Workers' Party (PSOE)	185,526	29.34	–17.59	3	–1
Forum of Citizens (FAC)	92,828	14.68	New	1	+1
United Left of Asturias: Plural Left (IU/IX)	83,755	13.24	+6.06	1	+1
Union, Progress and Democracy (UPyD)	24,721	3.91	+2.55	0	±0
Equo (Equo)	4,033	0.64	New	0	±0
Blank Seats (EB)	2,532	0.40	New	0	±0
Animalist Party Against Mistreatment of Animals (PACMA)	2,125	0.34	+0.17	0	±0
Communist Party of the Peoples of Spain (PCPE)	1,202	0.19	+0.05	0	±0
Andecha Astur (Andecha)	1,087	0.17	–0.02	0	±0
Hartos.org (Hartos.org)	867	0.14	New	0	±0
For a Fairer World (PUM+J)	383	0.06	±0.00	0	±0
Democratic and Constitutional Party (PDyC)	304	0.05	New	0	±0
Humanist Party (PH)	284	0.04	+0.02	0	±0
Internationalist Solidarity and Self-Management (SAIn)	282	0.04	±0.00	0	±0
Communist Unification of Spain (UCE)	209	0.03	New	0	±0
Blank ballots	8,392	1.33	+0.09		
Total	632,436			8	±0
Valid votes	632,436	99.03	–0.32		
Invalid votes	6,193	0.97	+0.32		
Votes cast / turnout	638,629	64.57	–6.72		
Abstentions	350,416	35.43	+6.72		
Registered voters	989,045				

=== 2008 ===
Summary of the 9 March 2008 Congress of Deputies election results in Asturias
Parties and alliances	Popular vote			Seats	
Parties and alliances	Votes	%	±pp	Total	+/−
Spanish Socialist Workers' Party (PSOE)	326,477	46.93	+3.55	4	±0
People's Party (PP)	289,305	41.58	–2.19	4	±0
United Left–Bloc for Asturias–The Greens (IU–BA–LV)	49,936	7.18	–1.24	0	±0
Union, Progress and Democracy (UPyD)	9,485	1.36	New	0	±0
The Greens–Green Group (LV–GV)	1,906	0.27	New	0	±0
Andecha Astur (AA)	1,299	0.19	–0.09	0	±0
Anti-Bullfighting Party Against Mistreatment of Animals (PACMA)	1,193	0.17	New	0	±0
Communist Party of the Peoples of Spain (PCPE)	946	0.14	+0.03	0	±0
Unity (Unidá)	848	0.12	New	0	±0
Social Democratic Party (PSD)	778	0.11	New	0	±0
Citizens for Blank Votes (CenB)	617	0.09	–0.10	0	±0
Citizens-Party of the Citizenry (C's)	575	0.08	New	0	±0
National Democracy (DN)	549	0.08	+0.04	0	±0
Republican Left (IR)	529	0.08	+0.03	0	±0
For a Fairer World (PUM+J)	446	0.06	New	0	±0
Engine and Sports Alternative (AMD)	369	0.05	New	0	±0
Internationalist Socialist Workers' Party (POSI)	262	0.04	New	0	±0
Internationalist Solidarity and Self-Management (SAIn)	250	0.04	New	0	±0
Spanish Phalanx of the CNSO (FE de las JONS)	237	0.03	–0.01	0	±0
Asturian Democratic Convergence (CDAS)	216	0.03	–0.05	0	±0
Family and Life Party (PFyV)	159	0.02	New	0	±0
Humanist Party (PH)	151	0.02	–0.04	0	±0
State of Spain Unionist Party (PUEDE)	117	0.02	New	0	±0
Spanish Alternative (AES)	98	0.01	New	0	±0
Authentic Phalanx (FA)	90	0.01	–0.02	0	±0
Spanish Front (Frente)	75	0.01	New	0	±0
Falangist Movement of Spain (MFE)	68	0.01	New	0	±0
National Alliance (AN)	67	0.01	New	0	±0
Carlist Party (PC)	57	0.01	New	0	±0
Blank ballots	8,630	1.24	–0.81		
Total	695,735			8	±0
Valid votes	695,735	99.35	–0.10		
Invalid votes	4,533	0.65	+0.10		
Votes cast / turnout	700,268	71.29	–0.44		
Abstentions	281,962	28.71	+0.44		
Registered voters	982,230				

=== 2004 ===
Summary of the 14 March 2004 Congress of Deputies election results in Asturias
Parties and alliances	Popular vote			Seats	
Parties and alliances	Votes	%	±pp	Total	+/−
People's Party (PP)	307,977	43.77	–2.56	4	–1
Spanish Socialist Workers' Party (PSOE)	305,240	43.38	+6.36	4	+1
United Left–Bloc for Asturias (IU–BA)	59,253	8.42	–1.84	0	–1
The Greens of Asturias (Verdes)	5,013	0.71	–0.03	0	±0
Asturianist Party (PAS)	4,292	0.61	–0.29	0	±0
Andecha Astur (AA)	1,970	0.28	–0.03	0	±0
Citizens for Blank Votes (CenB)	1,348	0.19	New	0	±0
Asturian Left (IAS)	854	0.12	–0.05	0	±0
Communist Party of the Peoples of Spain (PCPE)	798	0.11	New	0	±0
Asturian Democratic Convergence–CDS (CDAS–CDS)	582	0.08	–0.02	0	±0
Humanist Party (PH)	415	0.06	+0.01	0	±0
Republican Left (IR)	377	0.05	New	0	±0
National Democracy (DN)	254	0.04	New	0	±0
Spanish Phalanx of the CNSO (FE de las JONS)^{1}	253	0.04	+0.01	0	±0
Republican Social Movement (MSR)	216	0.03	New	0	±0
The Phalanx (FE)	181	0.03	–0.02	0	±0
Authentic Phalanx (FA)	179	0.03	New	0	±0
Blank ballots	14,453	2.05	+0.37		
Total	703,655			8	–1
Valid votes	703,655	99.45	+0.11		
Invalid votes	3,902	0.55	–0.11		
Votes cast / turnout	707,557	71.73	+4.74		
Abstentions	278,795	28.27	–4.74		
Registered voters	986,352				
Sources
Footnotes: ^{1} Spanish Phalanx of the CNSO results are compared to Independent Spanish Phalanx–Phalanx 2000 totals in the 2000 election.

=== 2000 ===
Summary of the 12 March 2000 Congress of Deputies election results in Asturias
Parties and alliances	Popular vote			Seats	
Parties and alliances	Votes	%	±pp	Total	+/−
People's Party (PP)	302,626	46.33	+5.30	5	+1
Spanish Socialist Workers' Party–Progressives (PSOE–p)	241,830	37.02	–2.83	3	–1
United Left (IU)	67,024	10.26	–5.25	1	±0
Asturian Renewal Union (URAS)	13,360	2.05	New	0	±0
Asturianist Party (PAS)	5,876	0.90	–0.79	0	±0
The Greens of Asturias (Verdes)	4,874	0.75	+0.26	0	±0
Andecha Astur (AA)	2,036	0.31	New	0	±0
Asturian Left Bloc (BIA)	1,085	0.17	New	0	±0
Party of Self-employed and Professionals (AUTONOMO)	1,036	0.16	New	0	±0
Centrist Union–Democratic and Social Centre (UC–CDS)	658	0.10	–0.14	0	±0
Spain 2000 Platform (ES2000)	607	0.09	New	0	±0
Humanist Party (PH)	329	0.05	New	0	±0
The Phalanx (FE)	295	0.05	New	0	±0
Natural Law Party (PLN)	280	0.04	New	0	±0
Independent Spanish Phalanx–Phalanx 2000 (FEI–FE 2000)	173	0.03	New	0	±0
Spanish Democratic Party (PADE)	160	0.02	New	0	±0
Blank ballots	10,985	1.68	+0.74		
Total	653,234			9	±0
Valid votes	653,234	99.34	–0.18		
Invalid votes	4,319	0.66	+0.18		
Votes cast / turnout	657,553	66.99	–8.92		
Abstentions	323,951	33.01	+8.92		
Registered voters	981,504				

=== 1996 ===
Summary of the 3 March 1996 Congress of Deputies election results in Asturias
Parties and alliances	Popular vote			Seats	
Parties and alliances	Votes	%	±pp	Total	+/−
People's Party (PP)	297,079	41.03	+3.66	4	±0
Spanish Socialist Workers' Party (PSOE)	288,558	39.85	+0.53	4	±0
United Left (IU)	112,339	15.51	+0.07	1	±0
Asturianist Party (PAS)	12,213	1.69	+0.09	0	±0
The Greens of Asturias (Verdes)	3,575	0.49	–0.17	0	±0
Centrist Union (UC)	1,709	0.24	–3.43	0	±0
Communist Party of the Peoples of Spain (PCPE)	813	0.11	–0.15	0	±0
Workers' Revolutionary Party (PRT)^{1}	497	0.07	–0.26	0	±0
Authentic Spanish Phalanx (FEA)	487	0.07	New	0	±0
Blank ballots	6,805	0.94	+0.03		
Total	724,075			9	±0
Valid votes	724,075	99.52	–0.07		
Invalid votes	3,492	0.48	+0.07		
Votes cast / turnout	727,567	75.91	+0.48		
Abstentions	230,845	24.09	–0.48		
Registered voters	958,412				
Sources
Footnotes: ^{1} Workers' Revolutionary Party results are compared to Workers' Socialist Party totals in the 1993 election.

=== 1993 ===
Summary of the 6 June 1993 Congress of Deputies election results in Asturias
Parties and alliances	Popular vote			Seats	
Parties and alliances	Votes	%	±pp	Total	+/−
Spanish Socialist Workers' Party (PSOE)	271,877	39.32	–1.24	4	±0
People's Party (PP)	258,355	37.37	+10.84	4	+1
United Left (IU)	106,757	15.44	–0.14	1	±0
Democratic and Social Centre (CDS)	25,351	3.67	–8.84	0	–1
Asturianist Party (PAS)	11,088	1.60	+1.02	0	±0
The Greens (Verdes)^{1}	4,532	0.66	–0.05	0	±0
Workers' Socialist Party (PST)	2,249	0.33	–0.14	0	±0
The Ecologists (LE)	1,408	0.20	–0.35	0	±0
Ruiz-Mateos Group–European Democratic Alliance (ARM–ADE)	920	0.13	–0.43	0	±0
Andecha Astur (AA)	787	0.11	New	0	±0
Independent Council of Asturias (Conceyu)	528	0.08	New	0	±0
Spanish Phalanx of the CNSO (FE–JONS)	355	0.05	–0.07	0	±0
Natural Law Party (PLN)	261	0.04	New	0	±0
Leonese People's Union (UPL)	243	0.04	New	0	±0
Coalition for a New Socialist Party (CNPS)^{2}	186	0.03	–0.05	0	±0
Humanist Party (PH)	178	0.03	–0.04	0	±0
Communist Unification of Spain (UCE)	0	0.00	New	0	±0
Blank ballots	6,306	0.91	+0.30		
Total	691,381			9	±0
Valid votes	691,381	99.59	+0.38		
Invalid votes	2,862	0.41	–0.38		
Votes cast / turnout	694,243	75.43	+6.53		
Abstentions	226,147	24.57	–6.53		
Registered voters	920,390				
Sources
Footnotes: ^{1} The Greens results are compared to The Greens–Green List totals in the 1989 election.; ^{2} Coalition for a New Socialist Party results are compared to Alliance for the Republic totals in the 1989 election.

=== 1989 ===
Summary of the 29 October 1989 Congress of Deputies election results in Asturias
Parties and alliances	Popular vote			Seats	
Parties and alliances	Votes	%	±pp	Total	+/−
Spanish Socialist Workers' Party (PSOE)	248,584	40.56	–5.43	4	–1
People's Party (PP)^{1}	162,590	26.53	–0.69	3	+1
United Left (IU)	95,494	15.58	+6.37	1	±0
Democratic and Social Centre (CDS)	76,643	12.51	–0.65	1	±0
The Greens–Green List (LV–LV)	4,352	0.71	New	0	±0
Asturianist Party (PAS)	3,526	0.58	New	0	±0
Ruiz-Mateos Group (Ruiz-Mateos)	3,424	0.56	New	0	±0
The Ecologist Greens (LVE)	3,340	0.55	New	0	±0
Asturian Nationalist Unity (UNA)	3,218	0.53	New	0	±0
Workers' Socialist Party (PST)	2,861	0.47	–0.14	0	±0
Workers' Party of Spain–Communist Unity (PTE–UC)^{2}	1,854	0.30	–1.28	0	±0
Communist Party of the Peoples of Spain (PCPE)	1,604	0.26	New	0	±0
Spanish Phalanx of the CNSO (FE–JONS)	751	0.12	–0.13	0	±0
Alliance for the Republic (AxR)^{3}	469	0.08	–0.07	0	±0
Humanist Party (PH)	406	0.07	New	0	±0
Communist Party of Spain (Marxist–Leninist) (PCE (m–l))^{4}	0	0.00	–0.12	0	±0
Blank ballots	3,728	0.61	+0.04		
Total	612,844			9	±0
Valid votes	612,844	99.21	+0.98		
Invalid votes	4,853	0.79	–0.98		
Votes cast / turnout	617,697	68.90	+1.08		
Abstentions	278,788	31.10	–1.08		
Registered voters	896,485				
Sources
Footnotes: ^{1} People's Party results are compared to People's Coalition totals in the 1986 election.; ^{2} Workers' Party of Spain–Communist Unity results are compared to Communists' Unity Board totals in the 1986 election.; ^{3} Alliance for the Republic results are compared to Internationalist Socialist Workers' Party totals in the 1986 election.; ^{4} Communist Party of Spain (Marxist–Leninist) results are compared to Republican Popular Unity totals in the 1986 election.

=== 1986 ===
Summary of the 22 June 1986 Congress of Deputies election results in Asturias
Parties and alliances	Popular vote			Seats	
Parties and alliances	Votes	%	±pp	Total	+/−
Spanish Socialist Workers' Party (PSOE)	278,946	45.99	–6.14	5	–1
People's Coalition (AP–PDP–PL)^{1}	165,071	27.22	–0.72	2	–1
Democratic and Social Centre (CDS)	79,788	13.16	+8.85	1	+1
United Left (IU)^{2}	55,881	9.21	+1.07	1	±0
Communists' Unity Board (MUC)	9,607	1.58	New	0	±0
Democratic Reformist Party (PRD)	5,105	0.84	New	0	±0
Workers' Socialist Party (PST)	3,688	0.61	+0.06	0	±0
Communist Unification of Spain (UCE)	1,821	0.30	+0.19	0	±0
Spanish Phalanx of the CNSO (FE–JONS)	1,497	0.25	+0.25	0	±0
Internationalist Socialist Workers' Party (POSI)	889	0.15	New	0	±0
Republican Popular Unity (UPR)^{3}	744	0.12	+0.03	0	±0
Party of the Communists of Catalonia (PCC)	0	0.00	New	0	±0
Blank ballots	3,477	0.57	+0.14		
Total	606,514			9	–1
Valid votes	606,514	98.23	–0.06		
Invalid votes	10,930	1.77	+0.06		
Votes cast / turnout	617,444	67.82	–9.78		
Abstentions	293,003	32.18	+9.78		
Registered voters	910,447				
Sources
Footnotes: ^{1} People's Coalition results are compared to People's Alliance–People's Democratic Party totals in the 1982 election.; ^{2} United Left results are compared to Communist Party of Spain totals in the 1982 election.; ^{3} Republican Popular Unity results are compared to Communist Party of Spain (Marxist–Leninist) totals in the 1982 election.

=== 1982 ===
Summary of the 28 October 1982 Congress of Deputies election results in Oviedo
Parties and alliances	Popular vote			Seats	
Parties and alliances	Votes	%	±pp	Total	+/−
Spanish Socialist Workers' Party (PSOE)	339,575	52.13	+14.85	6	+2
People's Alliance–People's Democratic Party (AP–PDP)^{1}	181,965	27.94	+19.31	3	+2
Communist Party of Spain (PCE)	53,017	8.14	–5.58	1	±0
Union of the Democratic Centre (UCD)	31,763	4.88	–28.14	0	–4
Democratic and Social Centre (CDS)	28,048	4.31	New	0	±0
Workers' Socialist Party (PST)	3,570	0.55	New	0	±0
Liberal Democratic Asturian Party (PADL)	2,493	0.38	New	0	±0
New Force (FN)^{2}	2,056	0.32	–1.76	0	±0
Spanish Communist Workers' Party (PCOE)	1,713	0.26	New	0	±0
Communist Unity Candidacy (CUC)^{3}	1,223	0.19	–0.39	0	±0
Spanish Solidarity (SE)	897	0.14	New	0	±0
Communist Unification of Spain (UCE)	712	0.11	–0.10	0	±0
Communist Party of Spain (Marxist–Leninist) (PCE (m–l))	567	0.09	New	0	±0
Asturian Falange (FA)	532	0.08	New	0	±0
Communist League–Internationalist Socialist Workers' Coalition (LC (COSI))	448	0.07	New	0	±0
Asturian Left Bloc (BIA)	0	0.00	New	0	±0
Spanish Phalanx of the CNSO (FE–JONS)	0	0.00	New	0	±0
Socialist Party (PS)^{4}	0	0.00	–0.58	0	±0
Blank ballots	2,799	0.43	+0.21		
Total	651,378			10	±0
Valid votes	651,378	98.29	–0.28		
Invalid votes	11,332	1.71	+0.28		
Votes cast / turnout	662,710	77.60	+14.86		
Abstentions	191,271	22.40	–14.86		
Registered voters	853,981				
Sources
Footnotes: ^{1} People's Alliance–People's Democratic Party results are compared to Democratic Coalition totals in the 1979 election.; ^{2} New Force results are compared to National Union totals in the 1979 election.; ^{3} Communist Unity Candidacy results are compared to Workers' Communist Party totals in the 1979 election.; ^{4} Socialist Party results are compared to Spanish Socialist Workers' Party (historical) totals in the 1979 election.

=== 1979 ===
Summary of the 1 March 1979 Congress of Deputies election results in Oviedo
Parties and alliances	Popular vote			Seats	
Parties and alliances	Votes	%	±pp	Total	+/−
Spanish Socialist Workers' Party (PSOE)^{1}	200,346	37.28	–1.54	4	±0
Union of the Democratic Centre (UCD)	177,459	33.02	+2.15	4	±0
Communist Party of Spain (PCE)	73,744	13.72	+3.25	1	±0
Democratic Coalition (CD)^{2}	46,365	8.63	–4.90	1	±0
National Union (UN)^{3}	11,178	2.08	+1.74	0	±0
Communist Movement–Organization of Communist Left (MC–OIC)^{4}	6,003	1.12	–0.76	0	±0
Workers' Communist Party (PCT)	3,102	0.58	New	0	±0
Spanish Socialist Workers' Party (historical) (PSOEh)^{5}	3,101	0.58	–0.45	0	±0
Asturian Nationalist Council (CNA)	3,049	0.57	New	0	±0
Workers' Revolutionary Organization (ORT)^{6}	2,518	0.47	–0.01	0	±0
Republican Left (IR)	1,740	0.32	New	0	±0
Spanish Phalanx of the CNSO (Authentic) (FE–JONS(A))	1,623	0.30	–0.15	0	±0
Party of Labour of Spain (PTE)	1,489	0.28	New	0	±0
Revolutionary Communist League (LCR)^{7}	1,312	0.24	–0.02	0	±0
Falangist Unity–Independent Spanish Phalanx (UF–FI–AT)	1,188	0.22	New	0	±0
Communist Unification of Spain (UCE)	1,149	0.21	New	0	±0
Union for the Freedom of Speech (ULE)	802	0.15	New	0	±0
Blank ballots	1,196	0.22	+0.04		
Total	537,364			10	±0
Valid votes	537,364	98.57	–0.07		
Invalid votes	7,815	1.43	+0.07		
Votes cast / turnout	545,179	62.74	–11.83		
Abstentions	323,714	37.26	+11.83		
Registered voters	868,893				
Sources
Footnotes: ^{1} Spanish Socialist Workers' Party results are compared to the combined totals of Spanish Socialist Workers' Party and People's Socialist Party–Socialist Unity in the 1977 election.; ^{2} Democratic Coalition results are compared to People's Alliance totals in the 1977 election.; ^{3} National Union results are compared to National Alliance July 18 totals in the 1977 election.; ^{4} Communist Movement–Organization of Communist Left results are compared to Regionalist Unity totals in the 1977 election.; ^{5} Spanish Socialist Workers' Party (historical) results are compared to Democratic Socialist Alliance totals in the 1977 election.; ^{6} Workers' Revolutionary Organization results are compared to Workers' Electoral Group totals in the 1977 election.; ^{7} Revolutionary Communist League results are compared to Front for Workers' Unity totals in the 1977 election.

=== 1977 ===
Summary of the 15 June 1977 Congress of Deputies election results in Oviedo
Parties and alliances	Popular vote			Seats	
Parties and alliances	Votes	%	±pp	Total	+/−
Spanish Socialist Workers' Party (PSOE)	182,850	31.74	n/a	4	n/a
Union of the Democratic Centre (UCD)	177,843	30.87	n/a	4	n/a
People's Alliance (AP)	77,932	13.53	n/a	1	n/a
Communist Party of Spain (PCE)	60,297	10.47	n/a	1	n/a
People's Socialist Party–Socialist Unity (PSP–US)	40,807	7.08	n/a	0	n/a
Regionalist Unity (UR)	10,821	1.88	n/a	0	n/a
National Alliance July 18 (AN18)	8,245	1.43	n/a	0	n/a
Democratic Socialist Alliance (ASDCI)	5,947	1.03	n/a	0	n/a
Federation of Christian Democracy (FPD–ID)	3,438	0.60	n/a	0	n/a
Workers' Electoral Group (AET)	2,781	0.48	n/a	0	n/a
Spanish Phalanx of the CNSO (Authentic) (FE–JONS(A))	2,615	0.45	n/a	0	n/a
Front for Workers' Unity (FUT)	1,512	0.26	n/a	0	n/a
Blank ballots	1,012	0.18	n/a		
Total	576,100			10	n/a
Valid votes	576,100	98.64	n/a		
Invalid votes	7,961	1.36	n/a		
Votes cast / turnout	584,061	74.57	n/a		
Abstentions	199,145	25.43	n/a		
Registered voters	783,206				

== Bibliography ==
- Ley 1/1977, de 4 de enero, para la Reforma Política (Fundamental Law 1/1977). Official State Gazette (in Spanish). 4 January 1977. BOE-A-1977-165.
- Real Decreto-ley 20/1977, de 18 de marzo, sobre Normas Electorales (Royal Decree-Law 20/1977). Official State Gazette (in Spanish). 18 March 1977. BOE-A-1977-7445.
- Constitución Española (Constitution). Official State Gazette (in Spanish). 27 December 1978. BOE-A-1978-31229.
- Ley Orgánica 5/1985, de 19 de junio, del Régimen Electoral General (Organic Law 5/1985). Official State Gazette (in Spanish). 19 June 1985. BOE-A-1985-11672.
- Carreras de Odriozola, Albert; Tafunell Sambola, Xavier (2005) [1989]. Estadísticas históricas de España, siglos XIX-XX (PDF) (in Spanish). Vol. 1 (II ed.). Bilbao: Fundación BBVA. pp. 1072–1097. ISBN 84-96515-00-1. Archived from the original (PDF) on 24 September 2015.
