= Unitat Municipal 9 =

Unitat Municipal 9 Municipal Unity 9
- Spokesperson: Joan Torrents
- Founded: 1979
- Headquarters: c/ Sant Pere, 2; Sant Pere de Ribes
- Ideology: Catalan Independentism; Socialism; Anti-capitalism; Municipalism; Ecologism; Direct democracy
- Political position: Far-left
- National affiliation: Popular Unity Candidates (CUP)
- Town council of Sant Pere de Ribes: 4 / 21
- Comarcal council of Garraf: 1 / 31

Website
- um9.cat

Unitat Municipal 9 (UM9, Municipal Unity 9 in English language) is a local political party, with an independentist and anticapitalist socialist ideology, of Sant Pere de Ribes (Garraf, Catalonia). UM9 is currently a member party of the Popular Unity Candidates.

== History ==
The history of the party dates back to the 1979 municipal elections, the first held after the reform of the regime. In these first elections, created an "agrupacion de electores" (voters agrupation) that gathered together the BEAN, PSUC, PTC, CCOO and independents. The number 1 of the list was Xavier Garriga i Cuadras, that was elected mayor in the elections. He was the first mayor of a candidacy of the modern Catalan independentist left in history. UM9 won the elections again in 1983 and in 1987 the list achieved an absolute majority. In 1986 UM9 was one of the main founders of the Popular Unity Candidates (CUP). In 1991 the list lost the absolute majority, but remained the most voted list and kept the mayor. In 1995 the agrupation transformed itself in a political party.

UM9 lost the local government in 1999, when a mayor of the Socialist Party of Catalonia (PSC) was elected. The party only regained the mayor between 2013 and 2014, after a crisis of the local agrupation of the PSC.

== Election results ==
| Year | Votes | % vote (position) | Councillors | +/- |
|---|---|---|---|---|
| 1979 | 1,362 | 34.2 (1) | 5 / 13 | |
| 1983 | 2,131 | 44.3 (1) | 8 / 17 | ▲3 |
| 1987 | 2,661 | 48.1 (1) | 9 / 17 | ▲1 |
| 1991 | 2,204 | 37.1 (2) | 7 / 17 | ▼2 |
| 1995 | 3,145 | 38.1 (1) | 7 / 17 | 0 |
| 1999 | 2,970 | 34.3 (2) | 7 / 21 | 0 |
| 2003 | 2.225 | 22,5 (2) | 5 / 21 | ▼2 |
| 2007 | 1,734 | 19.2 (2) | 4 / 21 | ▼1 |
| 2011 | 1,897 | 20.5 (3) | 5 / 21 | ▲1 |
| 2015 | 1,939 | 18.0 (3) | 4 / 21 | ▼1 |
