= Izquierda Española =

- Secretary-General: Guillermo del Valle Alcalá
- Founded: 27 December 2023
- Headquarters: Plaza del Pozo, 6, Morata de Tajuña
- Think tank: El Jacobino
- Ideology: Social democracy; Progressivism Political unitarism Republicanism
- Political position: Centre-left
- European Parliament (Spanish seats): 0 / 61

Website
- www.izqesp.es

Izquierda Española (literally "Spanish Left", IzqEsp) is a political party in Spain.

== History ==
The party was registered at the Ministry of the Interior on 27 December 2023. It was founded by Guillermo del Valle Alcalá, a lawyer and head of the think tank El Jacobino.

Among the members of the party are former Citizens (Cs) member Francisco Igea, who was a member of the Cortes of Castile and León and former vice president of the Junta of Castile and León; María Muñiz de Urquiza, a former Member of the European Parliament (MEP) for the Spanish Socialist Workers' Party (PSOE); and Soraya Rodríguez, former PSOE spokesperson in the Congress of Deputies and MEP for Cs.

Izquierda Española presented its list for the 2024 European Parliament election in Spain, led by Del Valle with Muñiz de Urquiza in second place. Despite wide coverage in the media, the party took only 0.18% of the vote, winning no seats.

== Ideology ==
Del Valle described his party as progressive and social democratic, and a centre ground between what he believed to be the right-wing view of Spain as an "essence" and the left-wing view of the country as a "Francoist relic". He criticised Salvador Illa, the nominee for President of the Government of Catalonia from the PSOE-affiliated Socialists' Party of Catalonia (PSC), for "having the same proposals as nationalism: that rich regions shouldn't redistribute".

The party is opposed to separatism from Basque and Catalan nationalists. It called Together for Catalonia "racist and xenophobic" and EH Bildu "heirs to terrorism", as well as accusing the Spanish government of PSOE prime minister Pedro Sánchez of whitewashing said groups. It has also criticised parties of the right, accusing the People's Party and Vox of not supporting equality.

== Election results ==
=== European Parliament ===
Election	Leading candidate	Votes	%	Seats
2024	Guillermo del Valle Alcalá	32,766	0.19 (#14)	0 / 61
