= Libertarian Party (Spain) =

Spanish political party

Libertarian Party Partido Libertario
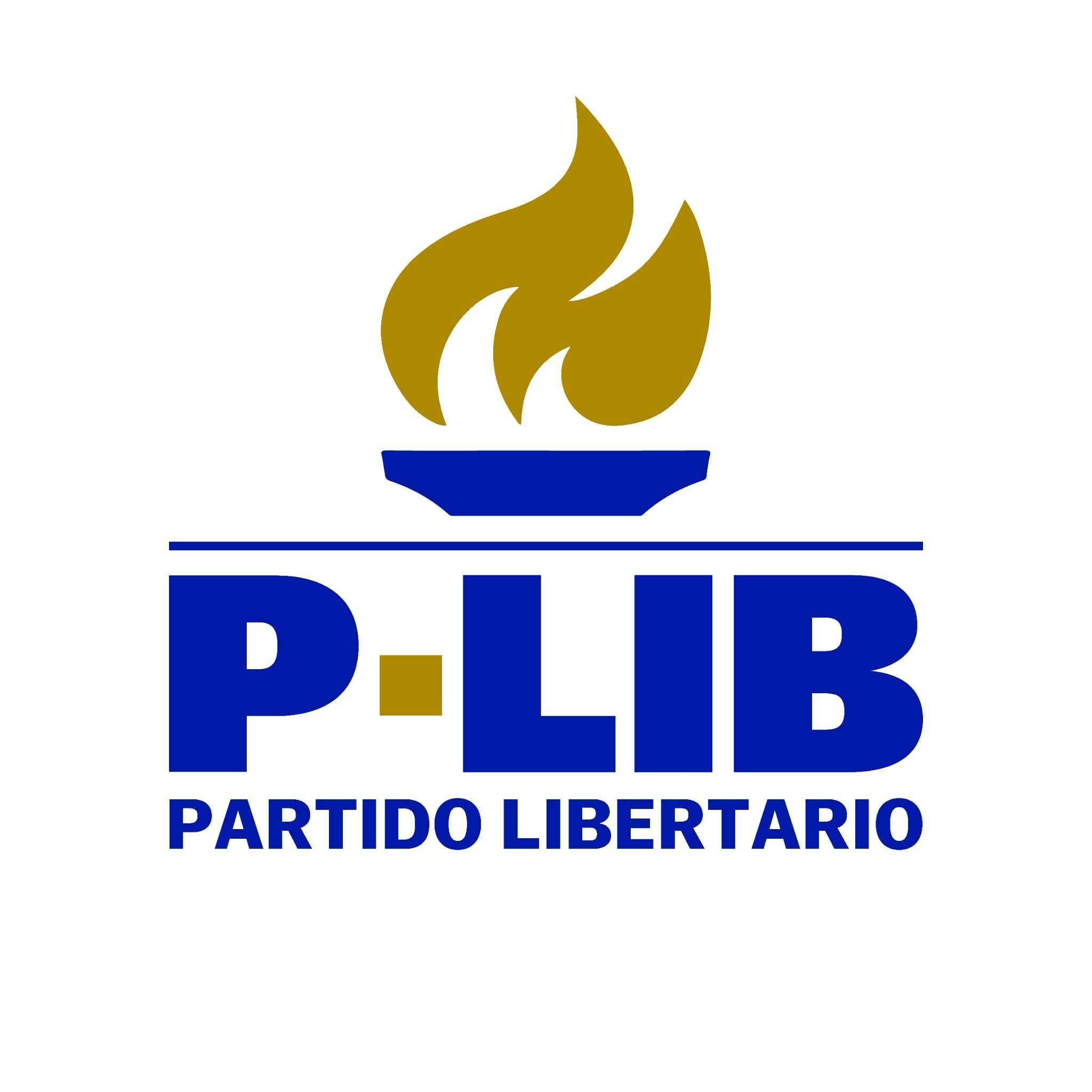
- President: Daniel Martínez
- Secretary-General: Jorge Martín Espada
- Founded: 2009; 17 years ago
- Headquarters: Madrid, Spain
- Ideology: Libertarianism; Minarchism; Anarcho-capitalism; Objectivism
- International affiliation: International Alliance of Libertarian Parties

Website
- www.p-lib.es

The Libertarian Party (Spanish: Partido Libertario, P-LIB), originally founded as the Party of Individual Freedom (Partido de la Libertad Individual), is a political party in Spain founded in 2009. The party advocates for radical reductions in the scope of the state, promoting minarchism, anarcho-capitalism, and the philosophy of objectivism.

== History ==
P-LIB was established as the Individual Freedom Party on 2 July 2009 and registered on 10 August of that same year as "Partido de la Libertad Invidiual". In its first congress, the P-LIB elected Juan Pina as its president and Francisco Cacharro Gosende as its secretary general. The party debuted electorally in the 2011 Spanish general election, contesting seats in Madrid and Zaragoza, where it received approximately 7,000 votes for the Senate.

In 2015, the P-LIB became a founding member of the International Alliance of Libertarian Parties (IALP). The party also maintains an active presence outside of parliament by participating in national and international ideological events, including the LibertyCon Europe 2026.

== Ideology ==
The party's platform is rooted in classical liberalism and key positions include:

- Economics: The total privatization of government functions and a radical reduction or elimination of taxes.
- State Structure: Unlike many Spanish conservative parties, the P-LIB is secular and advocates for a republic over the Spanish monarchy.
- Individual Rights: Support for absolute property rights, including opposition to squatting, and social freedoms such as individual moral autonomy.

== Electoral performance ==
The party has contested national, regional, and municipal elections since 2011, fielding candidates at national, regional, and municipal levels; as well as in the Elections to the European Parliament, since 2014.

=== Local representation ===
In the 2023 municipal elections, Paco Ramos was elected as a councilor in the municipality of Villanueva de Guadamejud (Cuenca).

== International affiliations ==
The P-LIB is a full member of the International Alliance of Libertarian Parties (IALP), a global network that includes the Libertarian Party (United States).

== See also ==
- Liberalism in Spain
- List of political parties in Spain
