= Ensame Nacionalista Astur =

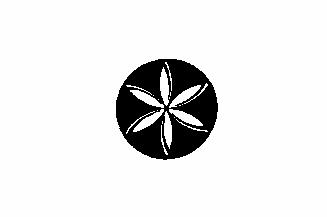
- Spokesperson: Andrés Solar
- Founded: 1982
- Dissolved: 1988
- Headquarters: C/Valentín Masip, 3 (Oviedo)
- Ideology: Asturian nationalism Socialism; Ecologism
- Political position: Radical left
- Trade union affiliation: Corriente Sindical d'Izquierda

Party flag

Ensame Nacionalista Astur (ENA), was a political party in Asturias, Spain. ENA was an Asturian nationalist and socialist party.

== History ==
ENA was created by ex-members of the Asturian Nationalist Council. The party presented a candidacy for the Asturian elections of 1983, led by the writer Andrés Solar. The list gained 2,505 votes (0.45%) and no seats. In the next Asturian elections the party presented a candidacy again, gaining 2,800 votes (0.49%). In the European elections of 1987 ENA, along with the Communist Movement of Asturias and the LCR supported the candidacy of the Basque coalition Herri Batasuna, that won 5,623 votes in Asturias (0.98%).

The party merged with the Xunta Nacionalista Asturiana to create a new party: Asturian Nationalist Unity.
