= Francisco Igea =

Spanish politician (born 1964)

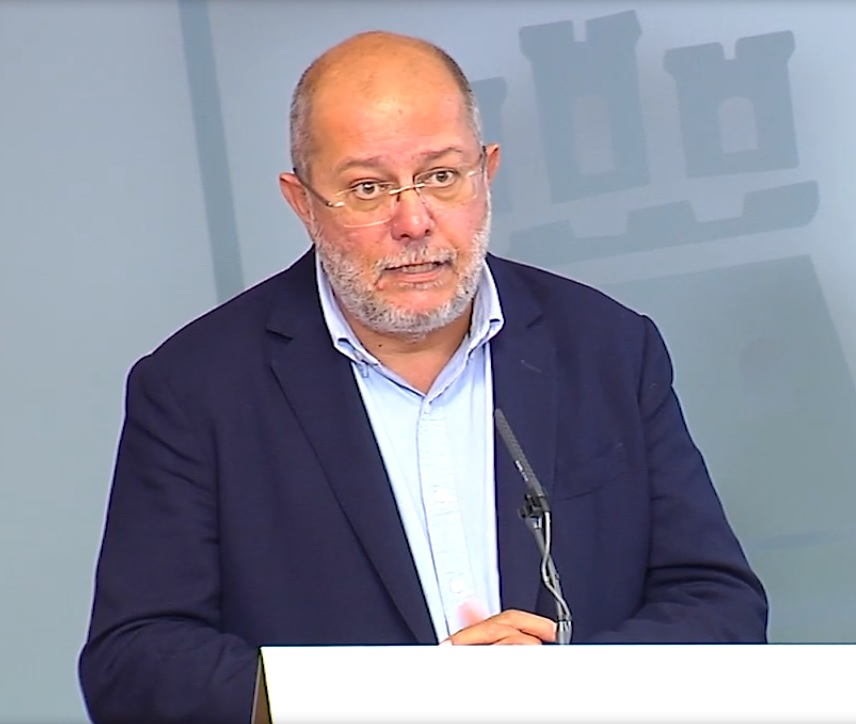
- Igea in 2019

Vice President of the Junta of Castile and León
- In office 17 July 2019 – 20 April 2022
- President: Alfonso Fernández Mañueco
- Preceded by: José Antonio de Santiago-Juárez
- Succeeded by: Juan García-Gallardo

Member of the Cortes of Castile and León
- In office 16 June 2019 – 15 March 2026
- Constituency: Valladolid

Member of the Congress of Deputies
- In office 13 January 2016 – 5 March 2019
- Constituency: Valladolid

Personal details
- Born: 17 April 1964 (age 61) Valladolid, Spain
- Party: Izquierda Española (2024–present)
- Other political affiliations: Citizens (2016–2023), Independent (2023–2024)
- Education: University of Valladolid (MD)
- Profession: Doctor

Francisco Igea Arisqueta (born 17 April 1964) is a Spanish politician. A doctor by profession, he was a member of the Congress of Deputies (2016–2019), represeting the party Citizens. He led his party in the 2019 Castilian-Leonese regional election, and became vice president of the Junta of Castile and León after forming a government with the People's Party leader Alfonso Fernández Mañueco.

Igea came runner-up in his party's 2020 leadership election. In the 2022 election, his party lost all their seats in the Cortes of Castile and León except his own. He was expelled from Citizens in 2023 for criticising their decision not to contest the 2023 Spanish general election, and retained his seat as an independent before joining Izquierda Española.

== Biography ==
Born in Valladolid, Igea graduated with a medical degree from the University of Valladolid. A specialist in the digestive system, he worked at a hospital in Palencia as head of department until 2013, when he volunteered for redundancy due to cuts.

Igea contested the primaries to lead Union, Progress and Democracy in the 2015 Castilian-Leonese regional election, losing to Rafael Delgado. He then left the party, for Citizens. He was elected to the Congress of Deputies in the Valladolid constituency in December 2015. The following June, he was the only member of his party in Castile and León to win re-election. In January 2017, he entered his party's central committee, responsible for health.

In February 2019, Igea announced that he would challenge Silvia Clemente in the party primaries to lead in May's regional elections. In March, on a recount, he defeated the former People's Party regional leader. His party became the third largest in the Cortes of Castile and León behind the Spanish Socialist Workers' Party (PSOE) and the PP. In July, his party formed a government with the PP, and he became regional vice president.

In December 2019, a judge closed a case against Igea initiated by a party member who had accused him of threats in March.

Igea announced his candidacy in February 2020 for Citizens' leadership election, standing against Inés Arrimadas. She won by 76.9% to 22.3%.

At the end of 2021, Mañueco called an early election with the aim of governing alone, as his counterpart Isabel Díaz Ayuso had achieved in the Community of Madrid. Igea was named Citizens' lead candidate by the party's national leadership without the need of a primary, citing new rules in the party for when there is an unexpectedly short electoral campaign. The election ended up with Citizens losing all their seats except Igea's while Vox made gains; he offered to align with the PP to top Vox governing.

In September 2023, Igea and Edmundo Bal were expelled from Citizens for criticising the party's decision not to contest the 2023 Spanish general election. Igea did not appeal the decision and did not resign his seat. In the 2024 European Parliament election in Spain, he was 32nd on the list of Izquierda Española. After considerable press coverage, the party took only 0.18% and no seats in the election; in Castile and León it polled 0.25%.
