= 2020 Cs general party assembly =

← 2017	7–8 March 2020 (primary); 30 April–3 May 2020 (assembly)	2023 →
- Registered: 20,713 (primary)
- Turnout: 12,328 (59.5%) (primary)
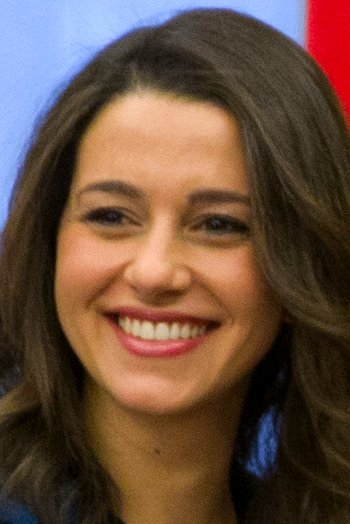

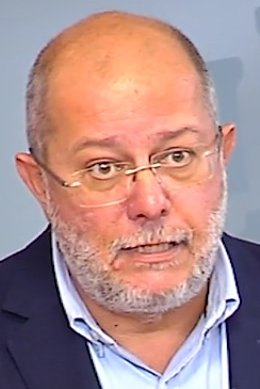

Candidate	Inés Arrimadas	Francisco Igea	Ximo Aparici
Popular vote	9,481 (76.9%)	2,752 (22.3%)	94 (0.8%)
Delegate vote	Unopposed	Eliminated	Eliminated
President before election
Manuel García Bofill (acting)
Elected President
Inés Arrimadas

The 5th General Assembly of Citizens was held between 30 April and 3 May 2020 to renovate the leading bodies of the Citizens party (Cs) and establish the party's main lines of action and strategy for the next leadership term. A primary election to elect the new party president was held between 7 and 8 March. The assembly was called following the resignation of party leader Albert Rivera on 11 November 2019 as a result of Cs obtaining the worst electoral result of the party in the general election held on 10 November.

The assembly was originally planned to be held on 14 and 15 March, but was delayed and forced to be held telematically as a result of the outbreak of the COVID-19 pandemic earlier that month and the enforcement of nationwide lockdowns to reduce the spread of SARS-CoV-2.

The leadership election saw the spokesperson of the party's parliamentary group in the Congress of Deputies, Inés Arrimadas, becoming the new party president, winning the membership vote by almost 77% of the vote over Vice President of Castile and León Francisco Igea, who got 22.3% of the share. A Valencian member with no official post, Ximo Aparici, contested the primary getting 0.8% of the votes.

== Candidates ==
Candidate	Age	Notable positions	Announced	Eliminated	Campaign	Ref.
=== Elected ===
Candidate elected as president.
Inés Arrimadas	38	Member of the Congress of Deputies for Barcelona (since 2019); Spokesperson of the Citizens Group in the Congress of Deputies (since 2019); Leader of the Opposition in the Parliament of Catalonia (2015–2019); Spokesperson of the Citizens Group in the Parliament of Catalonia (2015); Member of the Parliament of Catalonia for Barcelona (2012–2019)	27 November 2019	Elected		
=== Proclaimed ===
Candidates who met the endorsement requirement and were officially proclaimed to contest the primary election.
Francisco Igea	55	Vice President of Castile and León (since 2019); Minister of Transparency, Land Management and External Action of Castile and León (since 2019); Spokesperson of Castile and León (since 2019); Member of the Cortes of Castile and León for Valladolid (since 2019); Member of the Congress of Deputies for Valladolid (2016–2019)	25 February 2020	8 March 2020		
Ximo Aparici	46	None	6 February 2020	8 March 2020		

=== Declined ===
The individuals in this section were the subject of speculation about their possible candidacy, but publicly denied or recanted interest in running:

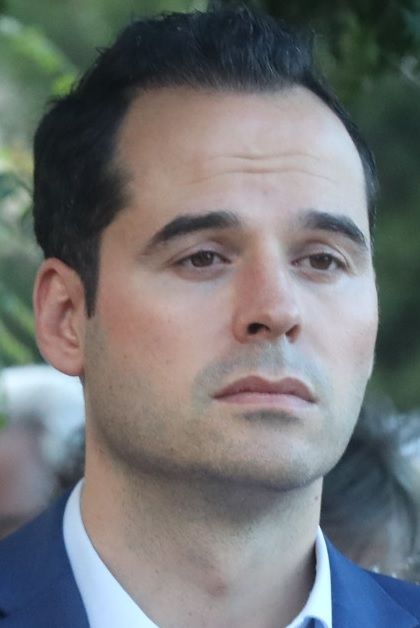
Ignacio Aguado

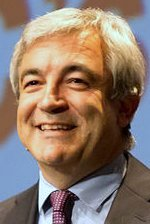
Luis Garicano

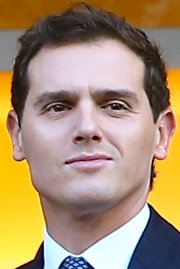
Albert Rivera

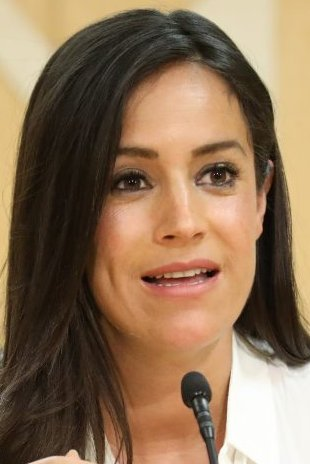
Begoña Villacís
- Ignacio Aguado (age 36) — Vice President of the Community of Madrid (since 2019); Minister of Sports and Transparency of the Community of Madrid (since 2019); Government Spokesperson of the Community of Madrid (since 2019); Deputy in the Assembly of Madrid (since 2015)
- Luis Garicano (age 52) — Member of the European Parliament (for Spain) (since 2019)
- Albert Rivera (age 39) — Member of the Congress of Deputies (2015–2019); President of the Citizens Party (2006–2019); Member of the Catalan Parliament (2006–2015)
- Begoña Villacís (age 42) — Deputy Mayor of Madrid (since 2019); City Councillor of Madrid (since 2015)

== Endorsements ==
=== Inés Arrimadas ===
Inés Arrimadas' endorsements
- Luis Garicano, Member of the European Parliament (for Spain) (since 2019)
- Ignacio Aguado, Vice President of the Community of Madrid (since 2019), Minister of Sports and Transparency of the Community of Madrid (since 2019), Government Spokesperson of the Community of Madrid (since 2019), Deputy in the Assembly of Madrid (since 2015)
- Begoña Villacís, Deputy Mayor of Madrid (since 2019), City Councillor of Madrid (since 2015)
- Juan Marín, Vice President of the Regional Government of Andalusia (since 2019), Regional Minister of Tourism, Regeneration, Justice and Local Administration of Andalusia (since 2019), Member of the Parliament of Andalusia (since 2015), Spokesperson of the Citizens Group in the Parliament of Andalusia (2015–2019)
- Eduardo de Castro, Mayor-President of Melilla (since 2019), Member of the Assembly of Melilla (since 2015)
- Toni Cantó, Member of the Corts Valencianes (for Castellón) (since 2019), Member of the Congress of Deputies (for Valencia) (2011–2015; 2016–2019)

== Results ==
Summary of the 7 March–3 May 2020 Cs national assembly results
Candidate	Primary		Assembly	
Candidate	Votes	%	Votes	%
Inés Arrimadas	9,481	76.91	Unopposed	
Francisco Igea	2,752	22.32	Eliminated	
Ximo Aparici	94	0.76	Eliminated	
Total	12,327		—	
Valid votes	12,327	99.99	—	
Invalid and blank ballots	1	0.01	—	
Votes cast / turnout	12,328	59.52	—	
Abstentions	8,385	40.48	—	
Registered voters	20,713		355	

Vote by party members
Arrimadas	76.91%
Igea	22.32%
Aparici	0.76%
