= List of provincial flags of Spain =

This is a list of flags of provinces of Spain. The flags are listed per autonomous community. The list also discusses coat of arms as most flags feature them.

In addition to the provinces which have no official flag (A Coruña, Zamora and the whole Valencian Community: Alicante, Castellón, Valencia), which sometimes use erroneously the capital town flag, or with the variants sometimes used by official institutions (like Diputación Provincial, for example in the case of Lugo) there might be some other confusion and controversies with background colour of the ones of Gipuzkoa (red Saint Andrew cross on blue field instead of white) and Badajoz (blue instead of burgundy), not for the coat of arms.

== Andalusia ==
Flag of Almería

Flag of Cádiz

Flag of Córdoba

Flag of Granada

Flag of Huelva

Flag of Jaén

Flag of Málaga

Flag of Seville

== Aragon ==
Flag of Huesca

Flag of Teruel

Flag of Zaragoza

== Asturias ==
Flag of Asturias

== Balearic Islands ==
Flag of the Balearic Islands

== Basque Country ==
Province	Flag	Coat of arms	Enactment Date	Description	Ref.
Álava			5 May 1993	Crimson flag with coat of arms. The coat of arms contains a castle on a rock represents the Castillo de Portilla (which in turn represents the province's defenders), the arm (like the castle) also represents the province's defenders, the lion representing the enemies of the province, the blue ribbon with the word "Justica" to represent the Brotherhoods of Álava fight against criminals. The lion and the castle was added during the era of the Kingdom of Castile. It also features the province's motto "EN AUMENTO DE LA JUSTICIA CONTRA MALHECHORES (IN INCREASE OF JUSTICE AGAINST EVIL DOES)" It is topped with the ducal crown.	
Biscay			Emblem: 15 December 1986; Flag: 27 December 1986	Maroon flag with coat of arms. It features the red cross shining over the Gernikako Arbola. It also contains eight red crosses on yellow. The shield is surrounded by the oak leaves with acorns. The coat of arms pays homage to the coat of arms of the Lordship of Biscay.	
Gipuzkoa			27 March 1990	White flag with coat of arms. The coat of arms features three common yews on blue and white waves. The white ribbon contains the provincial motto, "FIDELISSIMA BARDULIA NUNQUAM SUPERATA (Most Loyal Bardulia, never surpassed)". The coat of arms was topped with the ducal crown and surrounded by two savages.	

== Canary Islands ==
Flag of Las Palmas

Flag of Santa Cruz de Tenerife

== Cantabria ==
Flag of Cantabria

== Castile and León ==
Flag of Ávila

Flag of Burgos

Flag of León

Flag of Palencia

Flag of Salamanca

Flag of Segovia

Flag of Soria

Flag of Valladolid

Flag of Zamora

== Castilla-La Mancha ==
Flag of Albacete

Flag of Ciudad Real

Flag of Cuenca

Flag of Guadalajara

Flag of Toledo

== Catalonia ==
Flag of Barcelona

Flag of Girona

Flag of Lleida

Flag of Tarragona

== Extremadura ==
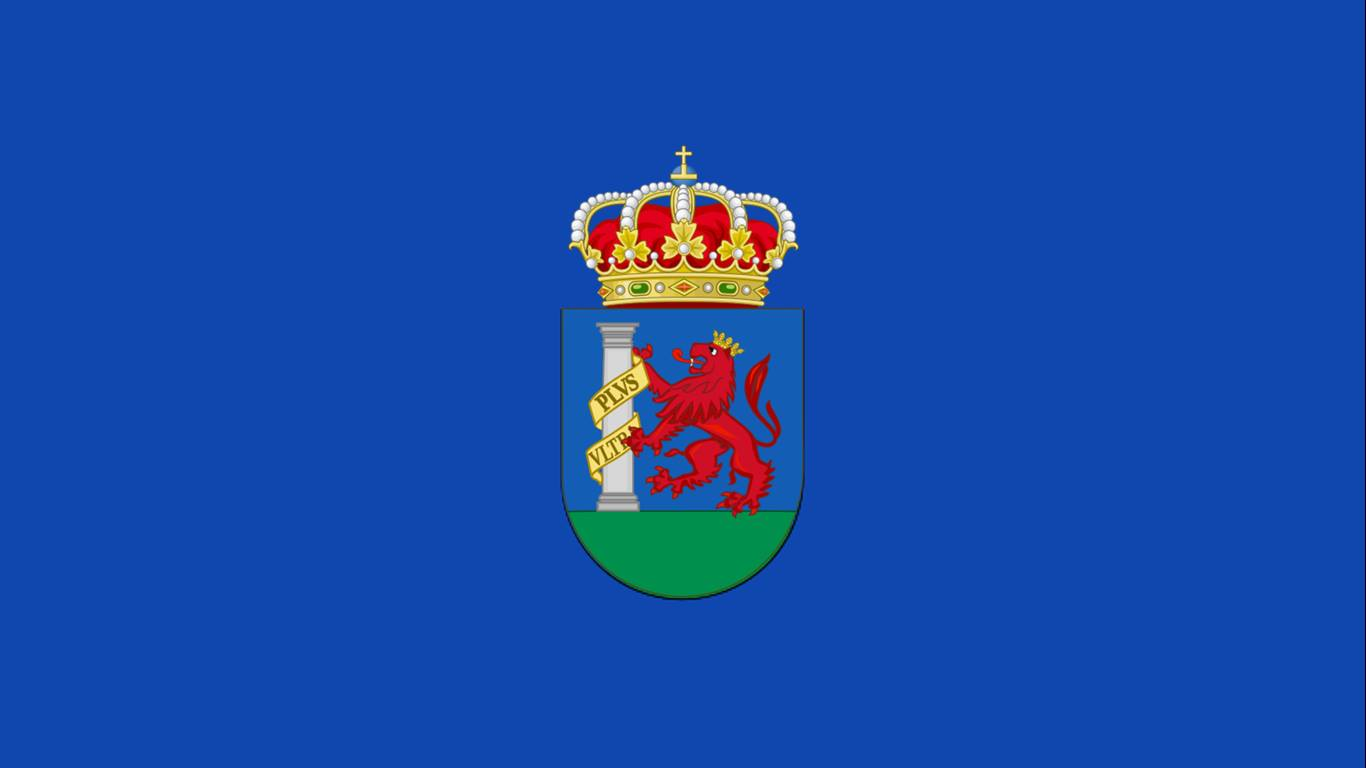
Flag of Badajoz

Flag of Cáceres

== Galicia ==
Flag of A Coruña

Flag of Lugo

Flag of Ourense

Flag of Pontevedra

== La Rioja ==
Flag of La Rioja

== Community of Madrid ==
Flag of Madrid

== Region of Murcia ==
Flag of Murcia

== Navarre ==
Flag of Navarre

== Valencian Community ==
Flag of Alicante

Flag of Castelló

Flag of Valencia

== Historical ==
Flag of the Province of Murcia (1976–1982)

== See also ==
- List of Spanish flags
