= Asturian Nationalist Unity =

Asturian Nationalist Unity Unidá Nacionalista Asturiana
- Spokesperson: Daniel Fernández Blanco; Tino Fernández
- Founded: 1988
- Dissolved: 1992
- Merger of: Ensame Nacionalista Astur; Xunta Nacionalista Asturiana
- Headquarters: Plaza de Riego, Number 3, Uviéu
- Ideology: Asturian nationalism Socialism; Ecologism
- Political position: Far-left
- Trade union affiliation: Corriente Sindical d'Izquierda

Party flag

Asturian Nationalist Unity (Asturian language: Unidá Nacionalista Asturiana, UNA), was a political party in Asturias, Spain, formed by the merger of two previous parties (Ensame Nacionalista Astur and Xunta Nacionalista Asturiana), in 1988. UNA was an Asturian nationalist and socialist party.

== History ==
In 1989, a year after the creation of the party, UNA participated in the European elections of that year, gaining 13.165 votes in all Spain, 4,.645 of them in Asturies (0.97% of the total). In the general elections of the same year UNA won 3,218 votes (0.53% of the Asturian vote).

UNA started talks with the Asturianist Party (PAS) to form a coalition for the Asturian elections of 1991 and the local elections of the same year after the failure of both parties in the previous general elections. This generated tensions within UNA, which led to a split of the sector that didn't want a coalition with the PAS in march 1990. The splitters founded two new political parties: Asturian Left and Andecha Astur. Finally, in 1991, PAS and UNA formed a coalition called Asturian Coalition (CA), that gained a seat in the Asturian elections of that year. In the local elections CA gained 10,891 votes (2.05% of the total in Asturies) and 6 town representatives (2 in Amieva, 1 in Aller/Ayer, Degaña, Nava and Cangas del Narcea).

Despite this relative success, CA broke in 1992, after a failed attempt to merge the two parties. UNA disappeared de facto after this crisis. Some of its ex-members formed Asturian League.

In 2008 UNA was refounded as Unidá.
