= Darréu =

Left-wing Asturian nationalist youth organization

Now–Youth of the Souverainist Left Darréu–Mocedá d'Izquierda Soberanista
- Headquarters: Oviedo, Asturias
- Ideology: Asturian nationalism Independence; Socialism; Feminism; Ecologism
- Mother party: Andecha Astur
- Newspaper: Írguite
- Website: mocedarevolucionario.com

Darréu–Mocedá d'Izquierda Soberanista (Asturian for: Right now–Youth of the Souverainist Left) is a left-wing Asturian nationalist youth organization. It is based in the Asturias region of northwestern Spain.

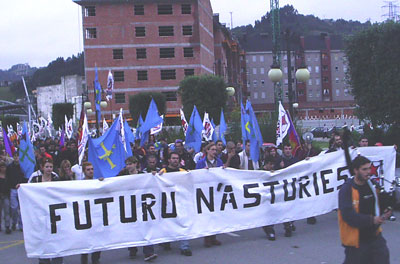
Darréu demonstration at La Felguera in 2006. The sign shows the motto: "Future in Asturias"

== Ideology ==
Darréu defines itself as a left-wing nationalist organization which tries to be the point of reference for the political movements of the left-wing asturian nationalist and pro-independence youth. The ideology of Darréu focuses on building a project based in youth activism to call for the recognition of Asturias as a nation and for the social rights of the working class.

Their militants can belong to the organization until they are thirty years old.

== Organization outline and activity ==
Darréu was originally tied to the asturian nationalist party Andecha Astur and worked as its youth section. Nevertheless, since 20 December 2014, Darréu has decided to break the formal links with Andecha Astur becoming an independent organization after some years of nonexistent relations.

However, Darréu aims to be the structure that works at the youth section of the Asturian Nationalism movement, which is integrated by different organisations, platforms and initiatives.

It is organized by "conceyos" (city councils), that simultaneously decide in assembly the "national policy" in the "National Xunta" (National Committee).

Darréu periodically holds different political and cultural activities. Some of their most known activities are the Asturies nun escaez ("Asturias does not forget") commemorative concerts of the Asturian October 1934 Revolution, which from 2006 are integrated in the Día de la Mocedá Revolucionario ("Day of Revolutionary Youth"). This day is used by asturian left-wing nationalist parties for demanding social and nationalist policies. The Darréu demonstration of 2006 used the motto Futuru n'Asturies ("Future in Asturias").

From its foundation, the organization also participates in the manifestations of the Day of the Asturian Nation of Andecha Astur and in the one of First of May that is launched by SUATEA, CSI (Corriente Sindical de Izquierda, Left Union Tendency) and CGT.

Darréu publishes the Írguite (Rise up) magazine, written totally in Asturian language, which features both cultural and political contents. Its activity can be seen at Blogspot.

== See also ==
- Andecha Astur
