= Marxist Unification Movement =

Marxist Unification Movement Moviment d'Unificació Marxista
- Founded: 1976
- Dissolved: 1978
- Merger of: Collectiu de Combat and Collectiu Català d'Alliberament
- Headquarters: Barcelona
- Ideology: Socialism; Catalanism; Catalan independence Anti-fascism; Marxism; Països Catalans
- Political position: Left-wing
- Colors: Red; Yellow

Marxist Unification Movement (in Catalan: Moviment d'Unificació Marxista) was a political group in Catalonia, Spain. MUM was founded in 1977, during the Spanish transition to democracy, by a group that had left the Socialist Party of National Liberation of the Catalan Countries (PSAN) in 1976 and the Col·lectiu Combat, a splinter group of the Catalan National Front (FNC).

MUM differed from other radical Catalan separatists in its willingness to participate in the Spanish electoral process. In the 1977 elections, MUM formed part of the Popular Unity Candidature for Socialism (Candidatura d'Unitat Popular cap el Socialisme), which launched Salvador Casanova as its main candidate. After the elections, MUM merged with the Party of Labour of Catalonia (PTC) and formed the Catalan Workers Bloc (BCT).
