= Flag of Menorca =

Flag of a Spanish island

- Use: Civil
- Adopted: 14 November 1983
- Design: Nine alternating horizontal bands of yellow and red emblazoned with the coat of arms of the Universitat General offset towards the hoist in the centre

The flag of Menorca was adopted on 14 November 1983. The flag depicts nine alternating horizontal bands of yellow and red emblazoned with the coat of arms of the Universitat General offset towards the hoist in the centre.

== History ==
On 8 August 1983 the regional council of Menorca established a commission to research symbols related to the island for usage on a flag. The commission concluded that there had never been an official flag of Menorca but that that island heavily relied on symbols of the Crown of Aragon for identification. The earliest use of the Aragonese flag, the Senyera, was dated back to 1232. The colours were officially adopted by the island following the defeat of the Moors by Alfonso III in 1287.

The Coat of Arms was chosen to reference the Universitat General, the municipal administrative body of Minorca between the 15th and 19th centuries. The coat of arms depicts a tower topped by a staff surmounted by a cross potent and a vane pointing to the right. The tower surmounts a building and is surrounded by a pentagonal wall with a gate in the front and four angle towers leaning towards the central tower. On the left and right are placed to crowned shields of Crown of Aragon; the whole design is inscribed in an octagon with curvilinear sides.

The council decided that both emblems were sufficient and they were combined to create the flag om 14 November 1983.

During the period of British rule between 1708 and 1802, the Union flag of Great Britain was used throughout the island.
