= Villanueva de Guadamejud =

Villanueva de Guadamejud, Spain
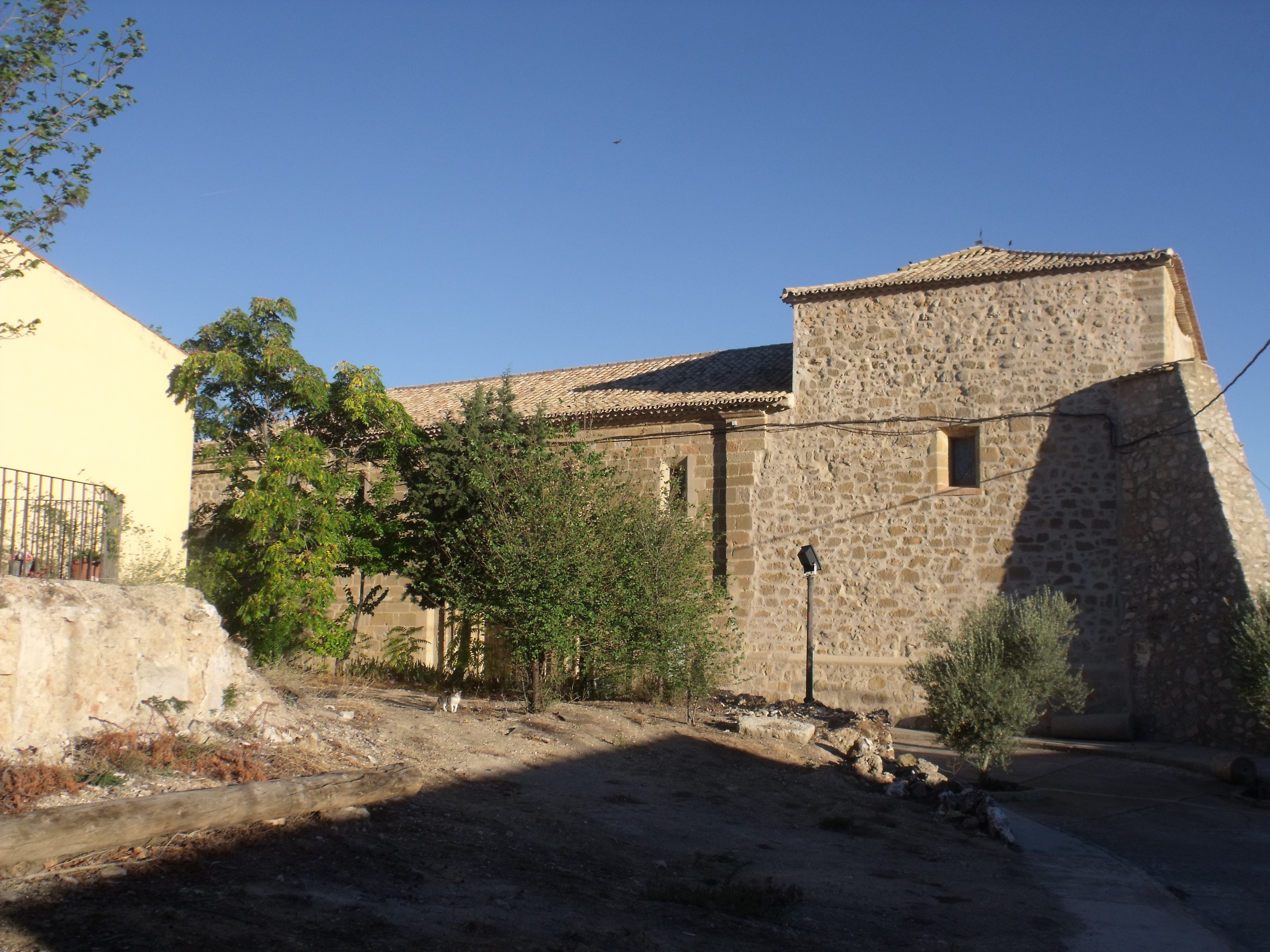

- Location within Spain Location within Castilla-La Mancha
- Coordinates: 40.2244°N 2.50556°W
- Country: Spain
- Autonomous community: Castile-La Mancha
- Province: Cuenca
- Municipality: Villanueva de Guadamejud

Area
  - Total: 30 km^{2} (12 sq mi)

Population (2025-01-01)
  - Total: 59
  - Density: 2.0/km^{2} (5.1/sq mi)
- Time zone: UTC+1 (CET)
  - Summer (DST): UTC+2 (CEST)

Villanueva de Guadamejud is a municipality located in the province of Cuenca, Castile-La Mancha, Spain. According to the 2004 census (INE), the municipality has a population of 112 inhabitants.
