= María Muñiz de Urquiza =

Spanish politician

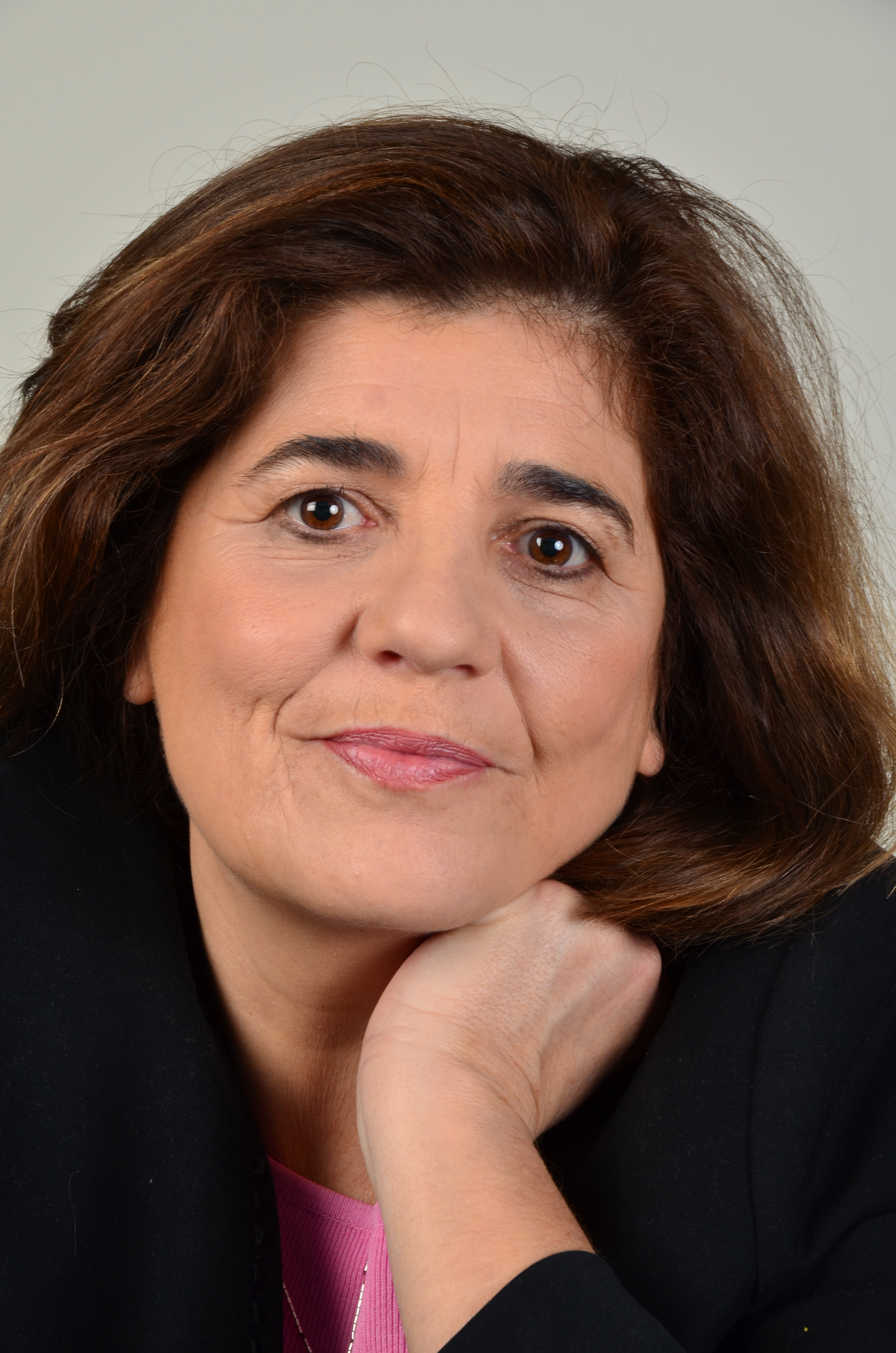
- Muñiz de Urquiza in February 2014

Member of the European Parliament
- In office 2009–2014

Personal details
- Born: 5 August 1962 (age 63) Gijón, Spain
- Party: Socialist Workers' Party

Video-Introduction

María Muñiz de Urquiza (born 5 August 1962, in Gijón) is a Spanish politician who served as a Member of the European Parliament for the Spanish Socialist Workers' Party (PSOE) from 2009 to 2014.

Muñiz de Urquiza has a PhD in political science and sociology. She also holds a postgraduate degree in European Community studies from the Diplomatic School of Spain, an institution affiliated with the Ministry of Foreign Affairs. She was a lecturer in international public law at the Charles III University of Madrid from 1989 to 1994.

In 1999, she was appointed Communications Secretary for PSOE-Europe, a post she held for a year. She has also worked as policy adviser to the Socialist Group in the European Parliament from 2004 to 2009. Her expertise was in external affairs and civil liberties. She was also an adviser for the Delegation for relations with the countries of Central America.
