= Catalan Workers Bloc =

Catalan Workers Bloc Bloc Català dels Treballadors
- Founded: 1978
- Dissolved: 1982
- Merger of: Party of Labour of Catalonia; Marxist Unification Movement
- Headquarters: Barcelona
- Ideology: Communism; Catalan independence
- Political position: Left-wing
- Town councillors (1979-1982): 1 / 8,223

BCT poster

Catalan Workers Bloc (Catalan: Bloc Català dels Treballadors) was a political party in Catalonia, Spain. Formed in 1978 through the merger of the Party of Labour of Catalonia (PTC) and the Marxist Unification Movement (MUM). BCT participated in the National Liberation Left Bloc (BEAN) in the 1979 general elections.

In 1982 when BEAN was dissolved, BCT dissolved and most of its members joined the Left Nationalists (NE).
