= Left Bloc for National Liberation =

Left Bloc for National Liberation Bloc d'Esquerra d'Alliberament Nacional
- Spokesperson: Lluís Maria Xirinacs; Fèlix Cucurull i Tey; Josep Guia
- Founded: 1979 (coalition); 1980 (political party)
- Dissolved: 1982
- Merger of: Catalan Workers Bloc; Socialist Party of National Liberation (1979-1980); POUM (1980)
- Succeeded by: NE; MDT
- Headquarters: Barcelona
- Newspaper: Temps de Tempesta
- Ideology: Revolutionary socialism Communism; Catalan independence Pancatalanism
- Political position: Far-left

Left Bloc for National Liberation (Catalan: Bloc d'Esquerra d'Alliberament Nacional, BEAN) was a coalition and, later, political party in Catalonia and Valencia, Spain. BEAN was an independentist and socialist party, that defended a Socialist Federal Republic of the Catalan Countries.

== History ==
Formed in 1979 as a coalition between the Catalan Workers Bloc (BCT) and the Socialist Party of National Liberation (PSAN), along with some independents, like Lluís Maria Xirinacs. In the local elections of that year the coalition gained 19 town councillors and 2 mayors (Arbúcies and Sant Pere de Ribes). In the city of Barcelona the Bloc withdrew the candidacy, supporting the PSUC and the Socialists' Party of Catalonia. In the general elections of the same year the coalition obtained 46,962 votes for Congreso de los Diputados in Catalonia (1.59%) and 9,620 votes (0.51%) in the Valencian Country. For Senate BEAN supported the successful independent candidacy of Lluís Maria Xirinacs in Barcelona.

In 1980, after the departure of PSAN and POUM, the coalition became a party. In the Catalan autonomic elections of that year BEAN only obtained 14,077 votes (0.52%), failing to gain any seat. The party disappeared in 1982, with many of its members joining either Left Nationalists or the Movement for Defence of the Land.
