= Asturian nationalism =

Nationalism and regionalism in Asturias, Spain

"Asturina cola estrella bermeya". Asturian socialist flag often used by left-wing nationalist asturian parties such as Andecha Astur

Nationalism and regionalism is present in the political spectrum of the Principality of Asturias, northern Spain. Asturian nationalist parties such as Partíu Asturianista had representation in the Asturian parliament and government, and others such as Andecha Astur had representation in some municipalities. However, nationalism is more of a social than a political movement.

== History ==
These movements are rooted in the stages of political sovereignty that Asturias experienced, beginning with the Kingdom of Asturias between the years 718 and 925, followed a millennium later with the declaration of sovereignty of The General Assembly of the Principality of Asturias of 1808, the Socialist Asturian Republic in 1934 and the Sovereign Council of Asturias and León of 1937 as highlights, although the two last are not nationalistic.

In 1976 the first modern Asturian nationalist party, the Asturian Nationalist Council, was founded. Modern-day Asturian nationalism includes political parties and organizations from the left of the political spectrum, including socialist Andecha Astur/Darréu, Unidá and Bloque por Asturies in the left-wing, and the social-democrat Partíu Asturianista. Combined, they represent a minimal part of Asturian society.

== Political parties and organizations ==
- Andecha Astur, leftist nationalist political party (socialist).
- Bloque por Asturies, leftist nationalist political party. In coalition with Izquierda Unida in Asturias.
- Unidá Nacionalista Asturiana, leftist nationalist political party formed by Izquierda Asturiana and other organizations.
- Unión Asturianista, electoral coalition of the social democrat nationalist Partíu Asturianista and the centrist- autonomist Unión Renovadora Asturiana.
- Conceyu Abiertu
- Compromisu por Asturies
- Darréu: youth organization.
- Corriente Sindical d'Izquierda: union.
