= Party of Labour of Catalonia =

Party of Labour of Catalonia Partit del Treball de Catalunya
- Founded: 1969
- Dissolved: 1980
- Ideology: Marxism-leninism; Maoism; Catalanism
- National affiliation: Party of Labour of Spain

The Party of Labour of Catalonia (Catalan: Partit del Treball de Catalunya) was a communist party in Catalonia, Spain. PTC was formed in 1979 following a split from the Party of Labour of Spain (PTE). The leader of PTC was Joan Sánchez Carreté, a politician who was active during the Franco dictatorship.

PTC soon merged with the Marxist Unification Movement (MUM) and formed the Catalan Workers Bloc (BCT). The group that remained in PTE also called itself PTC, and contested the 1979 parliamentary elections as "Partit del Treball de Catalunya (Federación del Partido del Trabajo de España)". In the 1980 Catalan regional election the party supported and participated in the electoral candidacy Unity for Socialism.
