= Corriente Sindical d'Izquierda =

Union in Asturies, Spain

CSI
- Left-wing Union Current
- Corriente Sindical d'Izquierda
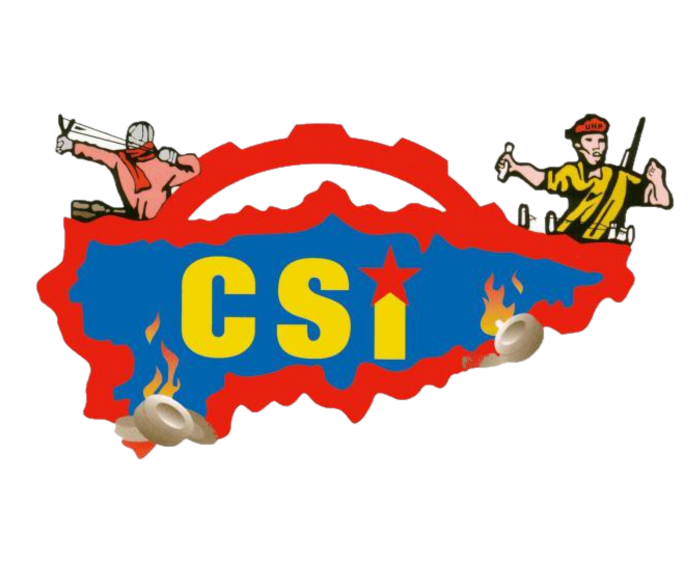
- Logo
- Founded: 1982
- Headquarters: Xixón
- Location: Asturies
- Publication: La fueya informativa
- Website: www.csi-asturies.org

The Corriente Sindical d'Izquierda (CSI, Left-wing Union Current in Asturian language), is an Asturian nationalist and anti-capitalist union in Asturies created in 1980 as a split of Comisiones Obreras. The CIS definest itself as "an Asturian working class union" and has a strong presence and representation in the naval and metallurgical sectors. The CSI has also achieved representation in the labour councils of civil services, media and education, among other sectors. The CSI defends a "combative" model of unionism, and is opposed to the negotiation strategy of Comisiones Obreras and the Unión General de Trabajadores.

CSI played an important role in the labor demands of the workers of the naval and metallurgical sectors, especially in Xixón and Avilés. Its leaders Cándido González Carnero and Juan Manuel Martínez Morala were sentenced to three years in prison for a crime of damages occurred during a strike of Naval Gijón, facts that were denounced by the city of Xixón, chaired by the mayor of the PSOE Paz Fernández Felgueroso. Both unionists were imprisoned on June 16, 2007, after being arrested after participating in a demonstration against their own conviction. Their story inspired the film 'Los lunes al sol' by Fernando León de Aranoa. Juan Manuel Martínez Morala was elected town councillor in Xixón in the local elections of 2015.
