= Andecha Astur =

Left-wing nationalist party in Asturias, Spain

- Spokesperson: Daniel Cueli
- Founded: 1990
- Headquarters: Oviedo
- Youth wing: Darréu (until 20 December 2014)
- Ideology: Asturian nationalism Socialism; Ecologism
- National affiliation: Ahora Repúblicas
- Union affiliation: Corriente Sindical d'Izquierda
- Local Government: 0 / 918

Website
- andecha.org

"Asturina cola estrella bermeya". A socialist and nationalist flag of Asturias used by Andecha Astur

Andecha Astur (Asturian for: Asturian Common Work or Asturian Solidarity) is an Asturian nationalist leftist political party of Spain.

== History ==
The party was founded in 1990. Between 2003 and 2007, they had two councilmen, one in Riosa and the other in Carreño, which they lost in 2007 elections. Current days Andecha Astur is working with some other nationalist parties of Spain.

== Ideology ==
Andecha Astur stands for:

- The recognition of Asturias as a nation.
- The right to self-determination.
- The recognition of the Asturian language as a national language of Asturias.
- The rights of the working class.
- Socialism.
- Emphasis on ecology.

== Youth ==
The youth wing of Andecha Astur is since 2004 Darréu-mocedá nacionaliego (nationalistic youth).

== Electoral performance ==
=== General Junta of the Principality of Asturias ===
Date	Votes			Seats	Size
Date	#	%	±pp	Seats	Size
1991	1,137	0.21%	—	0 / 45	11th
1995	1,948	0.30%	+0.09	0 / 45	8th
1999	2,206	0.36%	+0.06	0 / 45	7th
2003	3,821	0.62%	+0.26	0 / 45	7th
2007	2,770	0.46%	–0.16	0 / 45	6th
2011	Did not contest				
2012	674	0.13%	—	0 / 45	12th
2015	990	0.18%	+0.05	0 / 45	12th
2019	1,584	0.30%	+0.12	0 / 45	10th
2023	1,196	0.23%	–0.07	0 / 45	12th
