= Asturian Nationalist Council =

Political party in Spain

Asturian Nationalist Council Conceyu Nacionalista Astur
- Secretary-General: Anxelu Zapico
- Founded: 1976; 1979 (Legalization)
- Dissolved: 1981
- Newspaper: Asturies Dixebrá
- Ideology: Asturian nationalism Revolutionary socialism Workers' self-management Multi-tendency
- Political position: Far-left

Asturian Nationalist Council (in Asturian: Conceyu Nacionalista Astur or CNA), was a political party in Asturias, Spain. The CNA was Asturian nationalist and socialist party.

== History ==
CNA was created by young nationalists determined to break with the Asturian political tradition, and to offer an Asturian nationalist and left-wing alternative to the state-building process during the Spanish transition. The founder were inspired by the national liberation movements of the Catalan Countries, Galiza, Canaries and Basque Country. Among the founders were Xosé Lluis Carmona, singer Carlos Rubiera, Dubardu Puente, Pepe Fernández Alonso, Xesús Cañedo Valle and David Rivas (1957). Its secretary general was Anxelu Zapico. A lot of its members had been involved in the pro-Asturian language movement Conceyu Bable.

During its existence it did not achieve any big electoral success. One of the most polemic incidents was the arrest of various members of the party that were accused of collaborating with ETA (pm), an accusation that the party rejected. The party was illegal from 1976 to 1979.

CNA disappeared in 1981, giving birth to a series of new asturianist parties, like the Ensame Nacionalista Astur or the Partíu Asturianista.

== Ideology ==
The Council was a multi-tendency socialist party, although the majority of the members defended some sort of Workers' self-management. The party also defined itself as anti-colonial (considering Asturias a semi-colony of Spain), feminist, ecologist and pro-direct democracy. One of the most remarkable aspects of the party was its open defense of homosexual rights, one of the first political parties to do that in Spain.

== Elections results ==
Elections and date	Votes	% Asturias
Spanish general election, 1977	10.821	1'88%
Spanish general election, 1979	3.049	0'57%

Senate elections	Candidate	Votes	%
Spanish general election, 1979	Anxelu Zapico	8.309	-
