= 2023 Cs general party assembly =

- 11–12 January 2023 (primary); 14–15 January 2023 (assembly)
- Opinion polls
- Registered: 7,642 (primary)
- Turnout: 3,795 (49.7%) (primary)
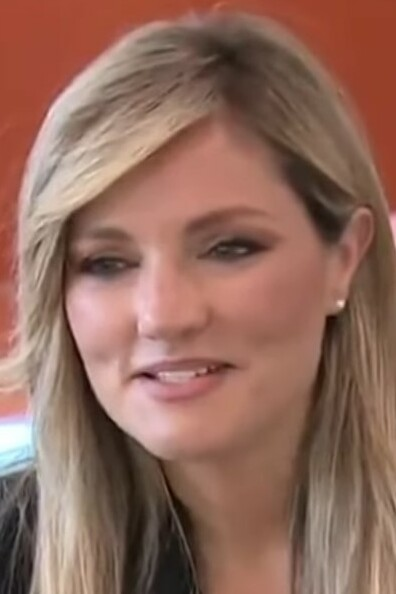

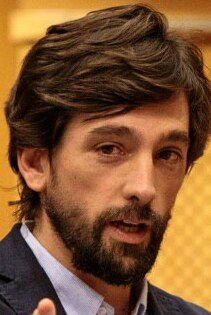

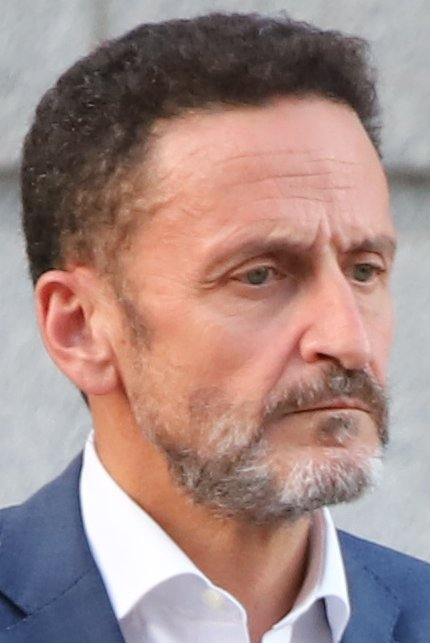

Candidate	Patricia Guasp; Adrián Vázquez	Edmundo Bal; Santiago Saura	Marcos Morales; Laura Alves
Popular vote	2,021 (53.3%)	1,493 (39.3%)	281 (7.4%)
Delegate vote	Unopposed	Eliminated	Eliminated
Leader before election
Inés Arrimadas (President)
Elected Leader
Patricia Guasp (Spokesperson)
Adrián Vázquez (Secretary-General)

The 6th General Assembly of Citizens was held between 9 and 15 January 2023, to renovate the leading bodies of the Citizens Party (Cs) and refound the party. On 21 June 2022, Inés Arrimadas called for a process of refoundation of the party following the succession of defeats in the Madrilenian, Castilian-Leonese and Andalusian elections where the party saw its representation drop to 0 or 1 seats. Following the conclusion of the refoundation, a bicephalous leadership was enforced separating in the positions of Secretary-General and Political Spokesperson.

On 26 December 2022, it was announced that the congress slogan would be "Radicalmente Libres" (Spanish: Radically free). The leadership election saw the joint list formed by Patricia Guasp and Adrián Vázquez and supported by the outgoing president Inés Arrimadas win with 53.3% of the vote, thus defeating the candidacy of Edmundo Bal, who got 39.3% of the vote. A grassroot candidacy formed by Marcos Morales and Laura Alves managed to get 7.4% of the sare.

== Candidates ==
Candidate	Age	Notable positions	Announced	Eliminated	Campaign	Ref.
=== Elected ===
Candidates elected as Secretary-General and Political Spokesperson.
Patricia Guasp	45	Regional Coordinator of Citizens Balearic Islands (since 2020); Member of the Parliament of the Balearic Islands for Mallorca (since 2019)	23 December 2022	Elected		
Adrián Vázquez	40	Member of the European Parliament for Spain (since 2020)	23 December 2022	Elected		
=== Proclaimed ===
Candidates who met the endorsement requirement and were officially proclaimed to contest the primary election.
Edmundo Bal	55	Vice-Secretary General of Citizens (since 2021); Member of the Congress of Deputies for Madrid (since 2019)	2 December 2022	12 January 2023		
Santiago Saura	48	City Councillor of Madrid (since 2019)	21 December 2022	12 January 2023		
Marcos Morales	19	None	27 December 2022	12 January 2023		
Laura Alves	29	City Councillor of El Álamo (since 2022)	27 December 2022	12 January 2023		
=== Announced ===
Candidates who announced an intention to run for the primary election, but were rejected as a result of not meeting the endorsement requirement.
Pablo Biarge	?	None	28 December 2022	29 December 2022	—	

=== Declined ===
The individuals in this section were the subject of speculation about their possible candidacy, but publicly denied or recanted interest in running:

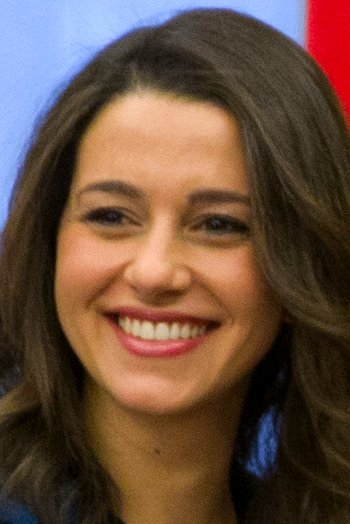
Inés Arrimadas

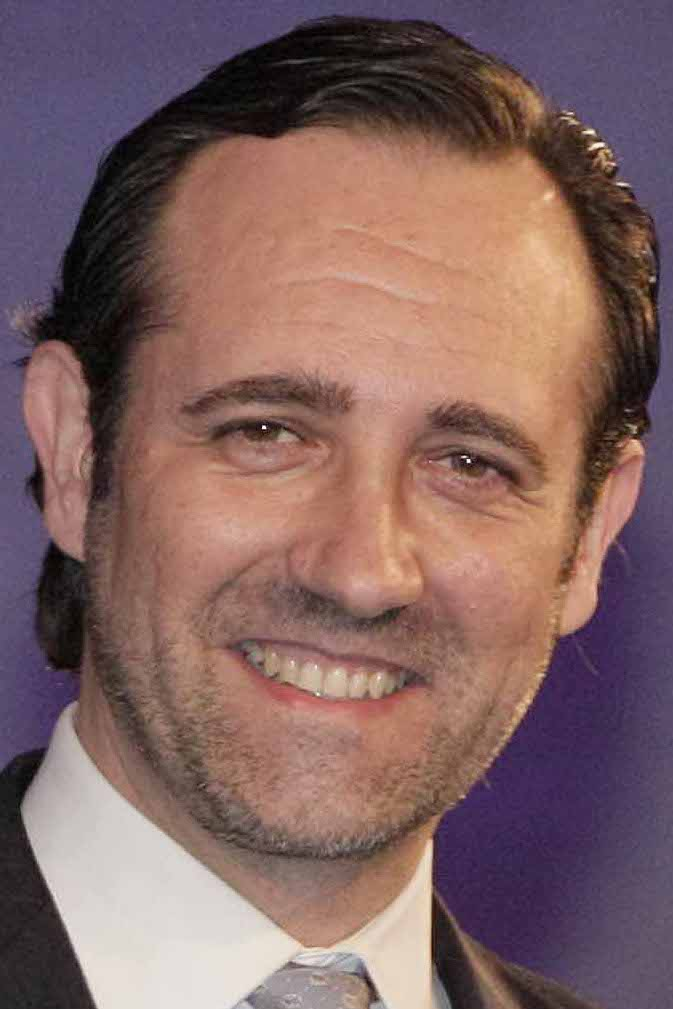
José Ramón Bauzá

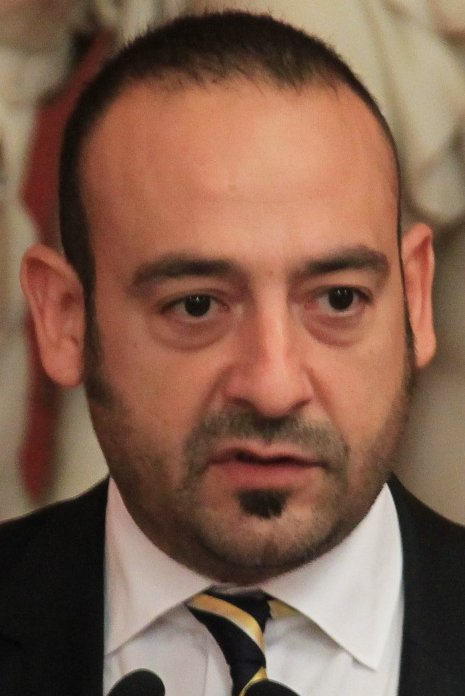
Jordi Cañas

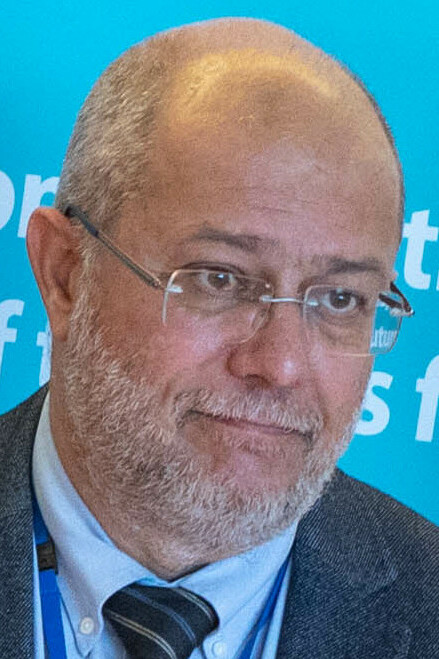
Francisco Igea

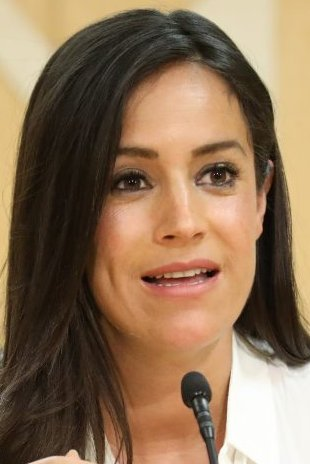
Begoña Villacís
- Inés Arrimadas (age 41) — President of Citizens (since 2020); Member of the Congress of Deputies for Barcelona (since 2019); Spokesperson of the Citizens Group in the Congress of Deputies (since 2019); Leader of the Opposition in the Parliament of Catalonia (2015–2019); Spokesperson of the Citizens Group in the Parliament of Catalonia (2015); Member of the Parliament of Catalonia for Barcelona (2012–2019).
- José Ramón Bauzá (age 52) — Member of the European Parliament for Spain (since 2019); Senator in the Cortes Generales appointed by the Parliament of the Balearic Islands (2015–2019); Deputy in the Parliament of the Balearic Islands for Mallorca (2011–2015); President of the Balearic Islands (2011–2015); President of the PP of the Balearic Islands (2009–2015); Mayor of Marratxí (2005–2011); City Councillor of Marratxí (1999–2011); Vice President of the PP of the Balearic Islands (2007–2009); Deputy Mayor for Urbanism and Health of Marratxí (2003–2005).
- Jordi Cañas (age 53) — Member of the European Parliament for Spain (since 2019); Member of the Parliament of Catalonia for Barcelona (2010–2014).
- Francisco Igea (age 58) — Member of the Cortes of Castile and León for Valladolid (since 2019); Vice President of Castile and León (2019–2021); Minister of Transparency, Land Management and External Action of Castile and León (2019–2021); Spokesperson of Castile and León (2019–2021); Member of the Congress of Deputies for Valladolid (2016–2019).
- Begoña Villacís (age 45) — Deputy Mayor of Madrid (since 2019); City Councillor of Madrid (since 2015).

== Endorsements ==
=== Total ===
Candidates seeking to run were required to collect the endorsements of at least 1.5% of the total party members (115 endorsements).

Summary of candidate endorsement results
Candidate	Endorsements		
Candidate	Count	% T	% V
Patricia Guasp/Adrián Vázquez	1,367	17.89	60.89
Edmundo Bal/Santiago Saura	679	8.89	30.24
Marcos Morales/Laura Alves	142	1.86	6.33
Pablo Biarge	57	0.75	2.54
Total	2,245		
Valid endorsements	2,245	29.38	
Not endorsing	5,397	70.62	
Total members	7,642		

Endorsements by party members
Guasp/Vázquez	60.89%
Bal/Saura	30.24%
Morales/Alves	6.33%
Biarge	2.54%

=== Public endorsements ===
==== Edmundo Bal/Santiago Saura ====
Edmundo Bal's and Santiago Saura's endorsements
- Sara Giménez, Member of the Congress of Deputies for Madrid (since 2019)
- Miguel Ángel Gutiérrez, Member of the Congress of Deputies for Madrid (since 2020)
- Francisco Igea, Member of the Cortes of Castile and León for Valladolid (since 2019), Former Vice President of Castile and León (2019–2021)
- María Carmen Martínez, Member of the Congress of Deputies for Cádiz (since 2019)
- Ana Martínez-Vidal, Deputy in the Regional Assembly of Murcia (since 2019), Former Minister of Business, Industry and Spokesperson of the Region of Murcia (2019–2021)
- María Muñoz, Autonomic Coordinator of Citizens Valencia (since 2021), Member of the Congress of Deputies for Valencia (since 2019)
- Juan Ignacio López-Bas, Member of the Congress of Deputies for Alicante (since 2021)
- Miguel Sánchez López, Spokesperson of the Citizens Group in the Congress of Deputies (since 2021), Senator in the Cortes Generales appointed by the Regional Assembly of Murcia (since 2019)
- César Zafra, Former Deputy in the Assembly of Madrid (2015–2021)

==== Patricia Guasp/Adrián Vázquez ====
Patricia Guasp's and Adrián Vázquez's endorsements
- Inés Arrimadas, President of Citizens (since 2020), Member of the Congress of Deputies for Barcelona (since 2019)
- Carlos Carrizosa, Member of the Parliament of Catalonia for Barcelona (since 2012), Former Leader of the Opposition in the Parliament of Catalonia (2019–2021)
- Guillermo Díaz, Member of the Congress of Deputies for Málaga (since 2016)
- Nacho Martín Blanco, Spokesperson of the Citizens Group in the Parliament of Catalonia (since 2021), Member of the Parliament of Catalonia for Barcelona (since 2018)
- Carlos Pérez-Nievas, Secretary of Organization of Citizens (since 2022), Member of the Parliament of Navarre (since 2019)
- Carmen Picazo, Regional Coordinator of Citizens Castilla–La Mancha (since 2020), Member of the Cortes of Castilla–La Mancha (since 2019)
- Mario Simón Martín, Mayor of Palencia (since 2019)
- Begoña Villacís, Deputy Mayor of Madrid (since 2019), City Councillor of Madrid (since 2015)

== Campaign ==
=== Election debates ===
6th Cs General Assembly debates
Date	Organisers	Moderator(s)	P Present NI Not invited			
Date	Organisers	Moderator(s)	#CdN	#RtP	#LBdC	Ref.
4 January	Cs	David Ferrero	P Saura	P Vázquez	P Alves	
9 January	Cs	David Ferrero	P Bal	P Guasp	P Morales	

== Opinion polls ==
Poll results are listed in the tables below in reverse chronological order, showing the most recent first, and using the date the survey's fieldwork was done, as opposed to the date of publication. If such date is unknown, the date of publication is given instead. The highest percentage figure in each polling survey is displayed in bold, and the background shaded in the candidate's colour. In the instance of a tie, the figures with the highest percentages are shaded. Polls show data gathered among Cs voters/supporters as well as Spanish voters as a whole, but not among party members, who are the ones ultimately entitled to vote in the primary election.

=== Cs voters ===
Polling firm/Commissioner	Fieldwork date	Sample size							Other /None	Question	Lead
Polling firm/Commissioner	Fieldwork date	Sample size	Arrimadas (Inc.)	Bal	Villacís	Guasp	Vázquez	Morales /Alves	Other /None	Question	Lead
**Primary election**	11–12 Jan 2023	—N/a (Note: Cs members.)	–	39.3	–	**53.3**		7.4	–	—N/a	14.0
ElectoPanel/Electomanía	9 Jan 2023	434	–	32.1	–	**57.2**		10.7	–	–	25.1
ElectoPanel/Electomanía	9–13 Dec 2022	1,007	29.5	**59.5**	–	–	–	–	–	11.0	30.0
SocioMétrica/El Español	6–10 Dec 2022	3,042	24.6	24.5	**34.3**	–	–	–	16.6		9.7

=== Spanish voters ===
Polling firm/Commissioner	Fieldwork date	Sample size				Other /None	Question	Lead
Polling firm/Commissioner	Fieldwork date	Sample size	Arrimadas (Inc.)	Bal	Villacís	Other /None	Question	Lead
ElectoPanel/Electomanía	9–13 Dec 2022	1,007	25.0	**54.1**	–	–	20.9	29.1
SocioMétrica/El Español	6–10 Dec 2022	3,042	16.3	**27.2**	23.2	33.3		4.0

== Results ==
Summary of the 11–15 January 2023 Cs national assembly results
Candidate	Primary		Assembly	
Candidate	Votes	%	Votes	%
Patricia Guasp/Adrián Vázquez	2,021	53.25	Unopposed	
Edmundo Bal/Santiago Saura	1,493	39.34	Eliminated	
Marcos Morales/Laura Alves	281	7.41	Eliminated	
Total	3,795		—N/a	
Valid votes	3,795	100.00	—N/a	
Invalid and blank ballots	0	0.00	—N/a	
Votes cast / turnout	3,795	49.66	—N/a	
Abstentions	3,847	50.34	—N/a	
Registered voters	7,642		390	

Vote by party members
Guasp/Vázquez	53.25%
Bal/Saura	39.34%
Morales/Alves	7.41%
