= Patricia Guasp =

Spanish politician

Patricia Guasp Barrero
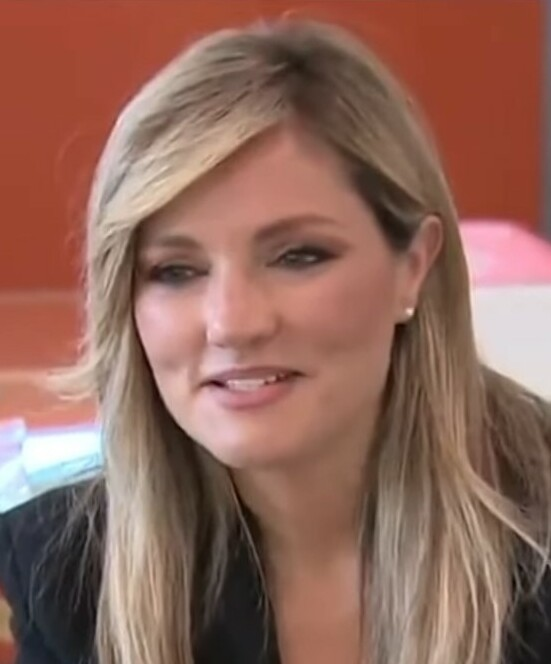

Political Spokesperson of the Citizens Party
- In office 15 January 2023 – 20 August 2023
- Deputy: Adrián Vázquez
- Preceded by: Inés Arrimadas (as President); Edmundo Bal (as National Spokesperson)
- Succeeded by: Jordi Cañas

Autonomic Coordinator of Citizens Balearic Islands
- In office 28 September 2020 – 20 June 2023
- Preceded by: Joan Mesquida

Member of the Parliament of the Balearic Islands
- In office 20 June 2019 – 20 June 2023
- Constituency: Mallorca

Personal details
- Born: 31 December 1977 (age 48) Palma, Spain
- Party: Citizens
- Education: Complutense University of Madrid

Patricia Guasp Barrero (born 31 December 1977) is a former Spanish politician, who was member of the Parliament of the Balearic Islands for Citizens, of which she also served as Autonomic Coordinator of its regional branch.

== Biography ==
Born on 31 December 1977, in Palma, she graduated in Law from the Complutense University of Madrid and completed a master's degree in European Union law at the Université libre de Bruxelles. She began working at the European Committee of the Regions in Brussels with paid internships. She has since worked as policy advisor for the European Parliament and for the government of Balearic Islands. She is currently on mandatory leave as a Senior Associate in the legal department of PwC.

She ran in the Cs list for the May 2019 Balearic regional election at the second place, being elected for the constituency of Mallorca. On 28 September 2020, she was appointed as leader of the regional branch of Citizens replacing Joan Mesquida. Ahead of the 6th Citizens' General Assembly, she announced a joint slate with Adrián Vázquez running for Secretary-General and herself for the position of Political Spokesperson. She received the support of the majority of members of the previous leadership, namely, Inés Arrimadas, Begoña Villacís and Carlos Carrizosa.
