= Saura =

Saura may refer to:

- Saura calendar, the Vedic and medieval Indian solar calendar

== People ==
- Antonio Saura, Spanish surrealist artist
- Carlos Saura, Spanish film director
- Enrique Saura, Spanish footballer
- Joan Saura, Spanish politician
- Santiago Saura Martínez de Toda, Spanish engineer, professor and politician
- Saura Lightfoot Leon, Dutch-born English-Spanish actress

== Places ==
- Saura, Nordland, a village in Nesna, Norway
- Saura, Norway, a village in Gildeskål, Norway
- Saura Mountains, mountains in North Carolina, USA

== See also ==
- Cheraw people, a Native American tribe, also known as the Saraw or Saura, who lived in the Saura mountains
- Saura painting, a style of mural painting associated with Saura tribes of Odisha, India
- -saura, a taxonomic suffix commonly used for dinosaurs and other extinct reptiles.
