= Diario de España =

Newspaper of Spain

- Periodismo from now on (Journalism from now on)
- Type: Daily newspaper
- Founder(s): Asociación de Noticias de Verificación de Bulos contra la desinformación, educación e investigación (ANOVEBU)
- Publisher: Publicaciones Diario de España, Sociedad Limitada (Publications Diario de España, Limited Company)
- President: David Muñoz López
- Editor: Eric Pérez López
- Founded: 5 May 2022; 3 years ago
- Political alignment: Liberalism Centralism Europeism
- Headquarters: Barcelona, Spain
- ISSN: 2952-4199
- Website: diariodeespana.es

Diario de España is a general and daily newspaper media founded by a non-profit association, and currently edited by the company Publicaciones Diario de España. It is based in Huelva (Andalusia) and Barcelona (Catalonia).

== History ==
Diario de España was created on 5 May 2022 through a Spanish non-profit association. According to Google through a shared analytics on its own page, the newspaper gets an average of 40,000 unique users on average per month.

Under the direction of David González, Diario de España had its first newsroom in Huelva (Andalusia), although after the change of address to David Muñoz, who had held the position of chief of policy and deputy director, changed its headquarters to Barcelona. Its presentation was held in this city, where it hosted politicians and recognized people in Catalonia and Spain. Since September 29, 2022, its director is David Muñoz.

== Collaborators ==
Among its main collaborators, are Sonia Reina, Miguel Urra, Edmundo Bal (deputy of Citizens in the Congress of Deputies), Soraya Rodríguez (MEP for Renew Europe) and Eva Poptcheva (MEP for Renew Europe).
