= Edmundo Bal =

Spanish politician (born 1967)

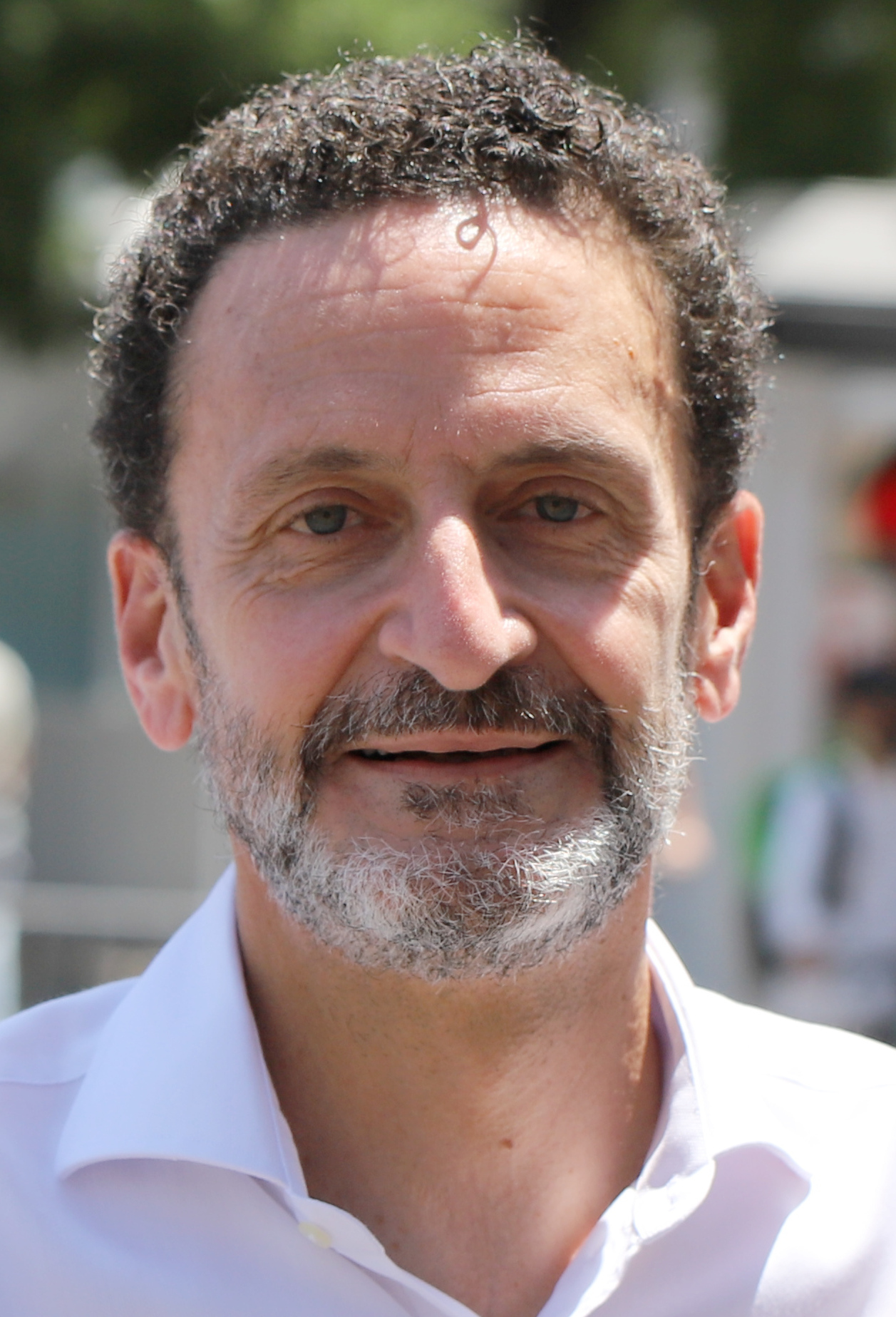
- Edmundo Bal in 2021

Member of the Congress of Deputies
- In office 21 May 2019 – 17 August 2023
- Constituency: Madrid

Personal details
- Born: 2 July 1967 (age 59) Huelva, Spain
- Party: Cree (since 2024)
- Other political affiliations: Citizens (2019–2023)
- Education: Complutense University of Madrid

Edmundo Bal Francés (born 2 July 1967) is a Spanish lawyer and politician. As a member of the State Lawyers Corps, he prosecuted La Liga footballers for tax avoidance, members of the governing People's Party for corruption (Gürtel case), and proponents of the Catalan independence movement for sedition.

A member of the Citizens party, Bal was elected to the Congress of Deputies in April 2019 for the Madrid constituency. He led the party in the 2021 Madrilenian regional election, in which they lost all 26 of their seats, and he came runner-up to Patricia Guasp in their 2023 leadership election. He was expelled from the party for criticising their decision not to contest the 2023 Spanish general election.

== Education and legal career ==
Born in Huelva, Andalusia, Bal graduated in Law from the Complutense University of Madrid. At the age of 25 in 1993, he joined the State Lawyers Corps.

As head of the State Criminal Law Department, Bal prosecuted FC Barcelona player Lionel Messi and club president Josep Bartomeu for tax avoidance. He attacked Barcelona player Gerard Piqué for linking him to the club's rivals Real Madrid; Bal is in fact a fan of Atlético Madrid. He also successfully prosecuted Cristiano Ronaldo, Ángel Di María, Radamel Falcao, Luka Modrić and José Mourinho for the same crime. He prosecuted in the Gürtel case, in which figures in the governing People's Party were convicted of corruption.

Bal charged the organisers of the 2017 Catalan independence referendum with insurrection. He was dismissed in November 2018 after a change of government, with the new Spanish Socialist Workers' Party (PSOE) administration not believing that it was an insurrection.

== Political career ==
In March 2019, Bal joined the Citizens party. He was placed fourth in their list for the Madrid constituency in the April 2019 general election. He initially lost his seat following the November elections, but regained it after party leader Albert Rivera retired from politics.

In March 2021, Bal received 89.4% of votes in the primary to lead Citizens in the Madrid regional elections in May. The party ran a centrist campaign, competing against the far-right party Vox to be the junior partner to regional president Isabel Díaz Ayuso's PP government. In the elections in May, the party's vote share fell by 16 percentage points to 3.5%, resulting in the loss of all of their 26 seats.

In January 2023, Bal ran for leader of Citizens, losing to Patricia Guasp who took 53.25% of the vote to his 39.34%. He was no longer the party's national spokesperson nor was Inés Arrimadas its president, with both roles being merged to being merged and held by Guasp. He continued as the party's secondary spokesperson in Congress, behind Arrimadas. In September, he and Francisco Igea were expelled from the party for criticising its decision not to contest the 2023 leadership election.

In February 2024, he launched a new political party called Cree ahead of the 2024 European Parliament elections, although he announced that he would not be leading the party's list. It won 0.05% of the vote in the election.

== Personal life ==
Bal is a drummer and a fan of AC/DC and Led Zeppelin, as well as being a Harley-Davidson rider. A regular marathon runner, he continued at a lower pace after two meniscus operations.
