= Jordi Cañas =

Spanish politician (born 1969)

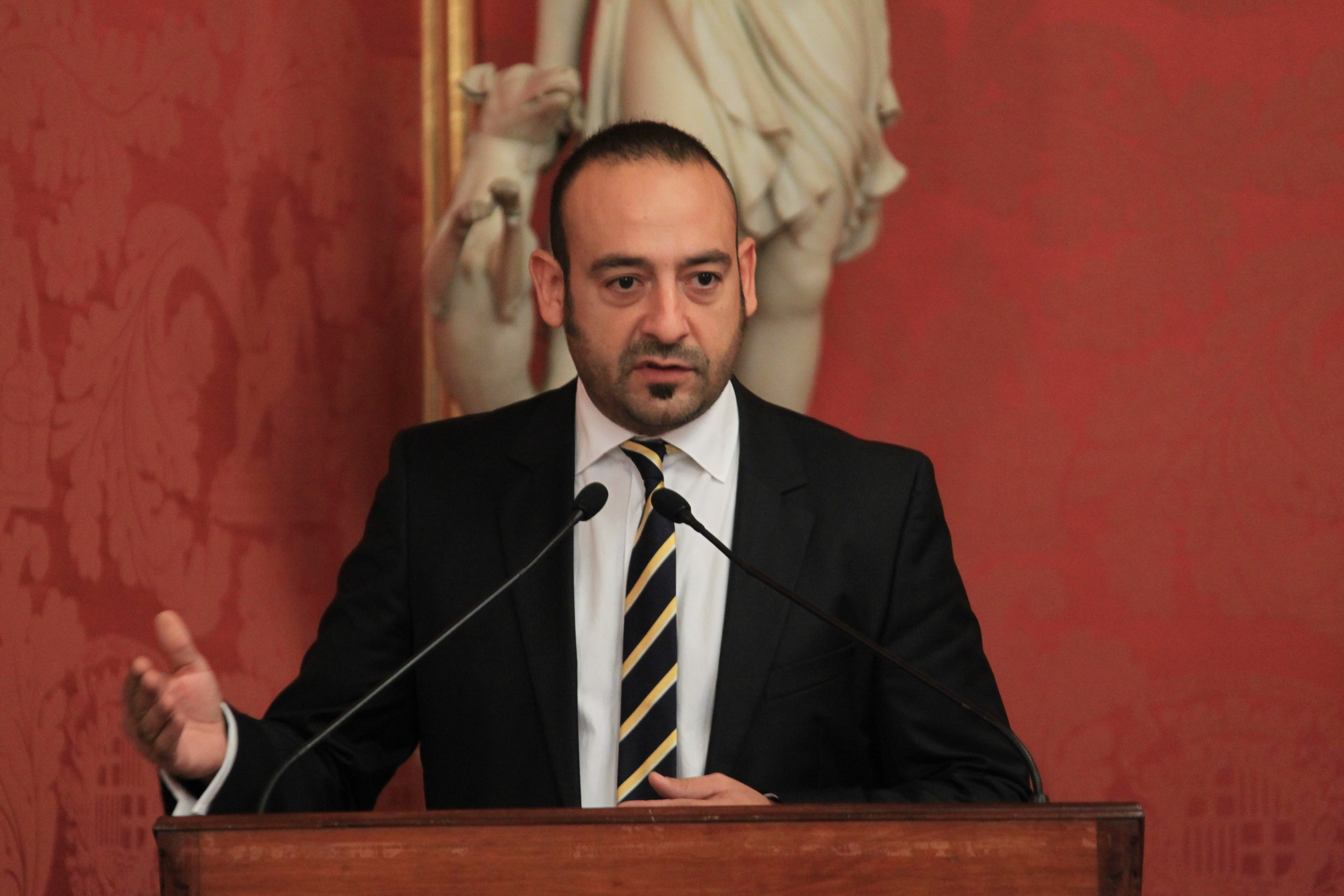

Member of the European Parliament for Spain
- In office 2 July 2019 – 16 July 2024

Member of the Catalan Parliament for Barcelona
- In office 28 November 2010 – 29 April 2014

Personal details
- Born: 12 December 1969 (age 56) Barcelona, Spain
- Party: Citizens (since 2006)
- Other political affiliations: Socialists' Party of Catalonia (1987–2003)
- Education: University of Barcelona
- Occupation: Politician

Jordi Cañas Pérez (Barcelona, born 12 December 1969) is a Spanish politician who was a Member of the European Parliament (MEP) from 2019 to 2024. He previously was member of the Parliament of Catalonia between 2010 and 2014, during the IX and X legislature.

== Early life and education ==
Degree in Geography and History, major in Prehistory and Ancient History, from the University of Barcelona.

== Political career ==
Member of the Socialist Party of Catalonia (PSC) and the Socialist Youth of Catalonia (JSC) from 1987 to 2003. He left the socialist group due to a disagreement with the party's decision to sign the so-called "Tinell Pact", to form a Generalitat of Catalonia government, agreed between the PSC, Esquerra Republicana de Catalunya (ERC) and Iniciativa Per Catalunya Verds (ICV), after Parliament of Catalonia elections on 16 November 2003.

He joined the Citizens' Party in 2006, the year the party was founded. In 2006 he was elected a member of the Barcelona Federation of Cs as a delegate for the Agrupació de Ciutat Vella. At the 2nd National Congress of Citizens, held on 1 July 2007, he was part of Albert Rivera's candidacy for party presidency. After voting through the open list system, Albert Rivera and his executive were elected. Jordi Cañas became then Secretary of Political Action and Strategy.

In 2008, after the general election results, Albert Rivera presented a strategic and renovation plan including changes in the Executive Committee. Jordi Cañas became National Spokesman of Citizens. Later, following the 2009 European election results, the general secretary and nine members of the executive resigned and, as a result, the executive was reshuffled and Cañas was appointed Secretary of Communication and Spokesperson.

=== Member of the Parliament of Catalonia ===
In the regional elections of Catalonia in November 2010, he was chosen in the primary as number three for Ciutadans' candidacy in the province of Barcelona. He was elected as a Member of the Parliament of Catalonia in the ninth legislature along with Albert Rivera and Carmen De Rivera, Cs again obtaining three deputies, repeating the 2006 results. He was also elected in the Ciutadans primary to lead the candidacy for the 2011 municipal elections in Barcelona, where he did not become a council member.

In the Parliament of Catalonia elections in November 2012, he was named on the primary elections number 2 on the Barcelona list, and elected as deputy of the X Legislature, with 9 Cs deputies obtaining candidatures. During this legislature, he acted as Spokesman for the Parliamentary Group of Ciutadans. In that electoral campaign, the tribal heart of Cs was also designed. In the remodeling of the executive after the 2012 elections, the Secretary of Communication role was removed, and Jordi Cañas became Secretary of Political Action and Strategy.

=== Resignation from the Parliament of Catalonia ===
On 25 April 25, 2014, he resigned his seat in the Parliament of Catalonia in order not to enjoy immunity, after the Superior Court of Justice of Catalonia (TSJC) summoned him to testify as a defendant along with his former partner and nine other people for an alleged Public Treasury tax fraud of €429,203 when he was a company administrator in 2005. Four years later, on 6 February 2018, the State's Attorney withdrew the accusation on the same day the trial was held.

Between November 2014 and 2018, he was parliamentary adviser to the MEPs Juan Carlos Girauta and Javier Nart of the Citizens' Party. The party had won two seats in the last European elections. Furthermore, in 2017, during the party's 4th Assembly held in Coslada, Jordi Cañas supported the amendment to maintain the original Citizens' ideology, which was defeated in Congress and the official proposal that defined Cs as a progressive liberal party was imposed.

=== Member of the European Parliament ===
In the European elections held on 26 May 2019, Cañas was number 6 on Citizens' list in the European Parliament and was elected as MEP for the 9th term of office with Cs securing 7 seats.

As a member of the Cs delegation, Cañas belongs to the liberal Renew Europe group, of which he is the Latin America coordinator. He serves as a full member of the Committee on International Trade (INTA), where he is his parliamentary group’s rapporteur on the EU-Mercosur Association Agreement, as well as a member of the Committee on Employment and Social Affairs (since 2021). Since March 2020, he has also been a substitute member of the Committee on the Internal Market and Consumer Protection (IMCO).

In addition to his committee assignments, Cañas serves as first vice-president of the Parliament’s delegation to the Euro-Latin American Assembly (EUROLAT). He is also a member of the delegations for relations with the Mercosur countries and with the countries of South Asia. Since 2021, he has been part of the Parliament's delegation to the EU-UK Parliamentary Assembly, which provides parliamentary oversight over the implementation of the EU–UK Trade and Cooperation Agreement.

Cañas also serves as first vice-president of the Social Economy Intergroup and a member of the Disability Intergroup.

=== Currently ===
After Citizens’ performance in the Spanish general elections on 10 November 2019, which led to the resignation of Albert Rivera as president, Cañas supported Inés Arrimadas' delegate lists for the V Cs General Assembly and was part of the executive list that made up her candidacy to lead the party. Arrimadas won the primary elections on March 8, 2020, and Jordi Cañas became a member of the Executive Committee of Citizens.

== Political Responsibilities within Cs ==
Years	Position
2007-2009	Secretary for Political Action and Strategy. Citizens (Cs).
2009-2012	Spokesperson for the Executive Committee Cs
2009-2012	Secretary of Communication and Spokesperson. Citizens (Cs)
2010-2012	Regional Member of the Catalan Parliament
2012-2014	Regional Member of the Catalan Parliament and Spokesman of the Cs parliamentary group in the Parliament of Catalonia.
Since 2019	Member of the European Parliament for Citizens (Cs).
Since 2020	Member of the Executive Committee of Citizens
