= 2021 Madrilenian regional election =

Election in the Spanish region of Madrid

- 4 May 2021

All 136 seats in the Assembly of Madrid 69 seats needed for a majority
- Opinion polls
- Registered: 5,112,813 ▲1.1%
- Turnout: 3,667,806 (71.7%) ▲7.4 pp
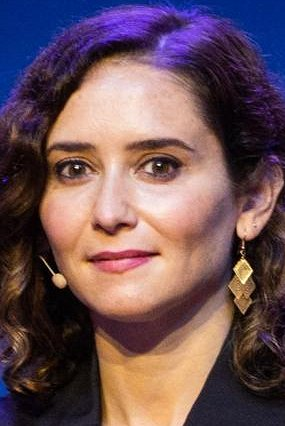

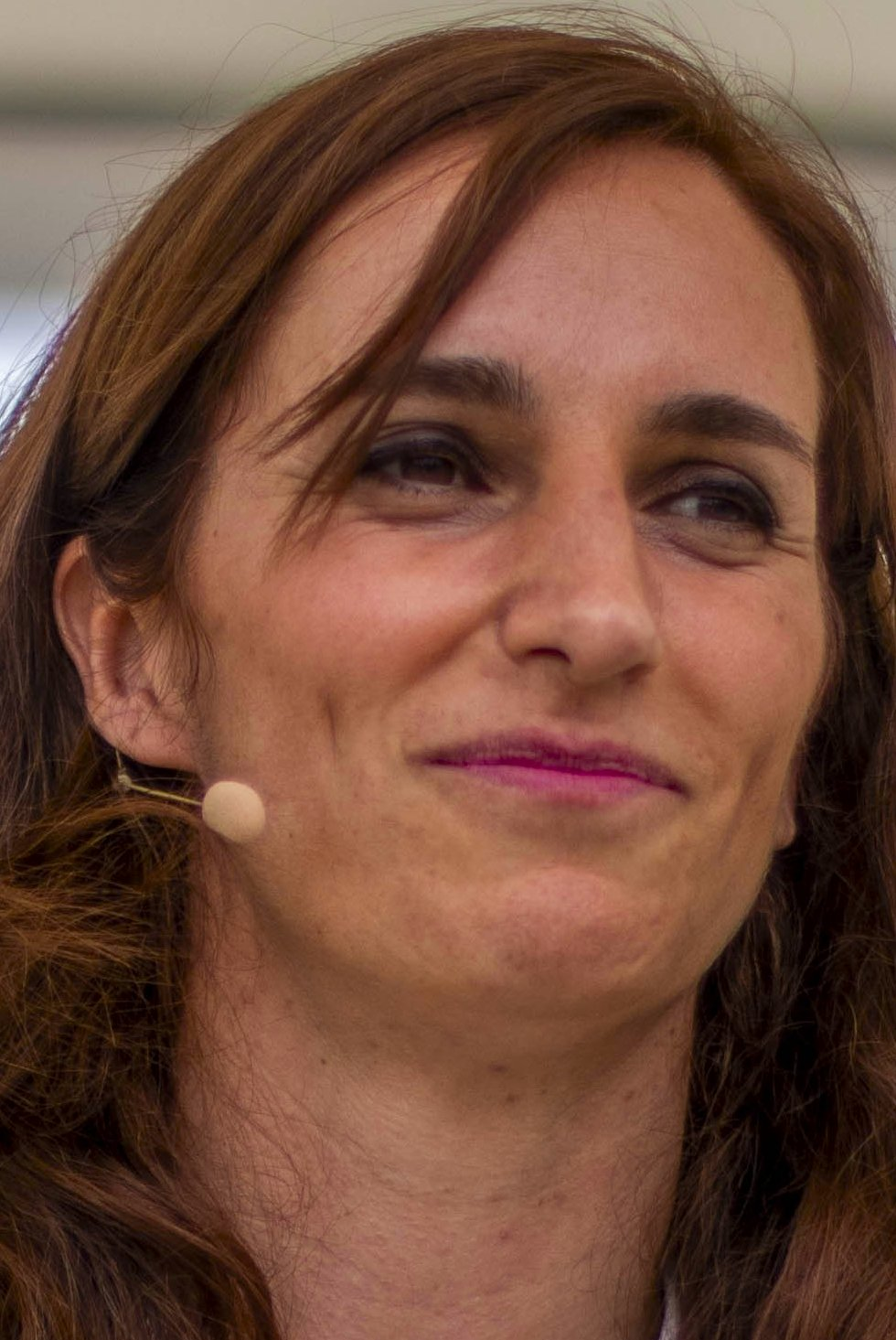

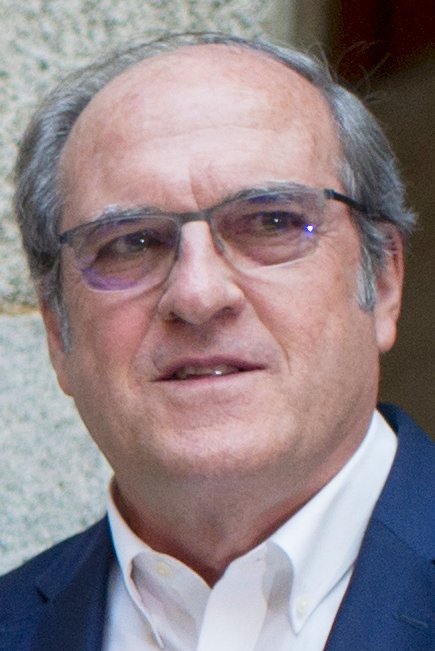

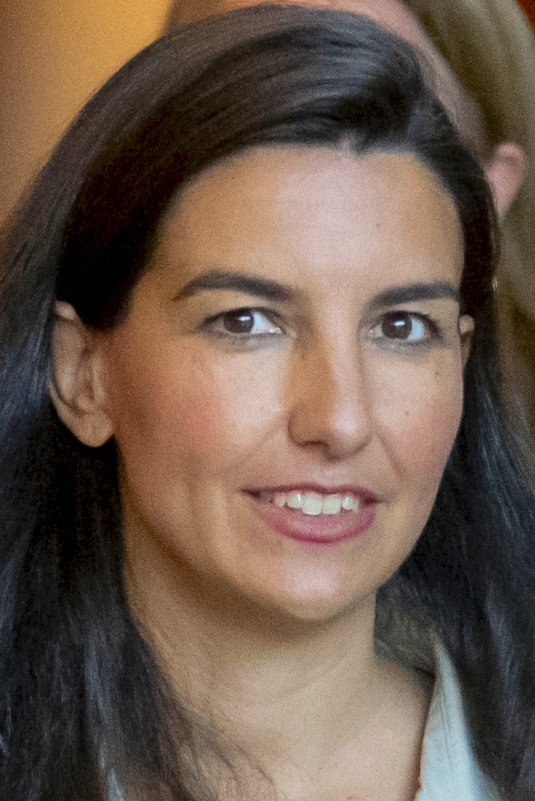

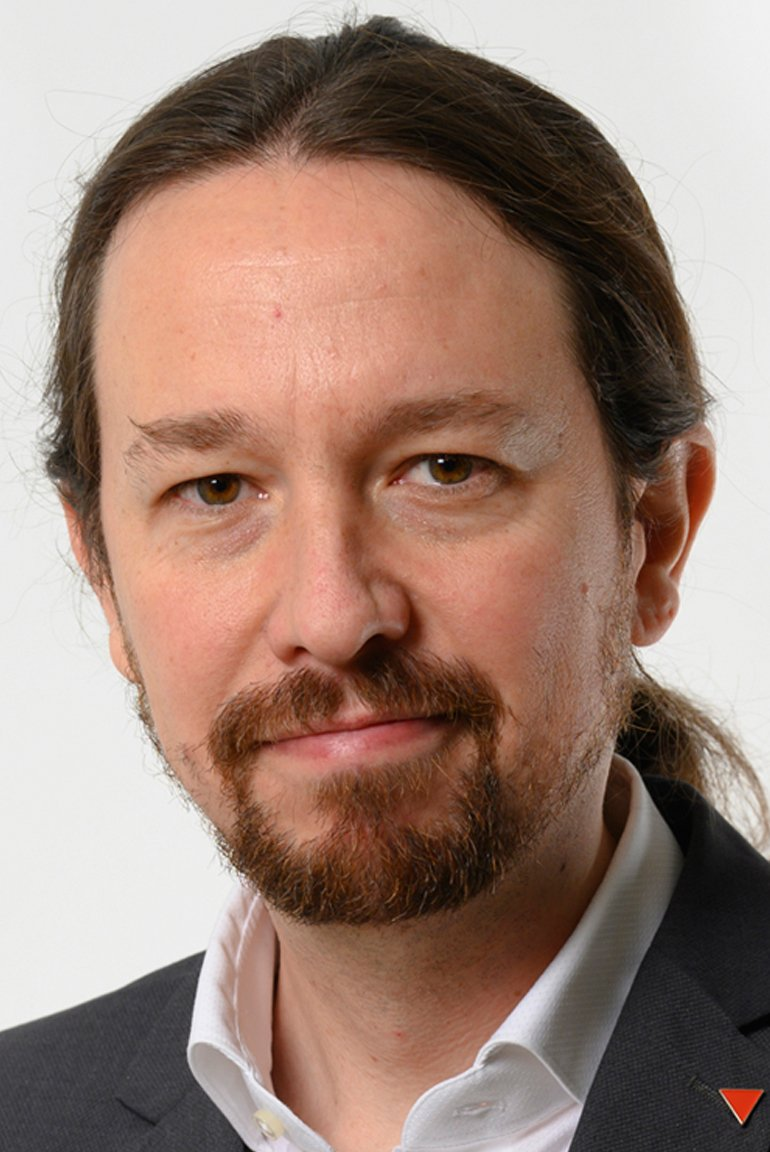

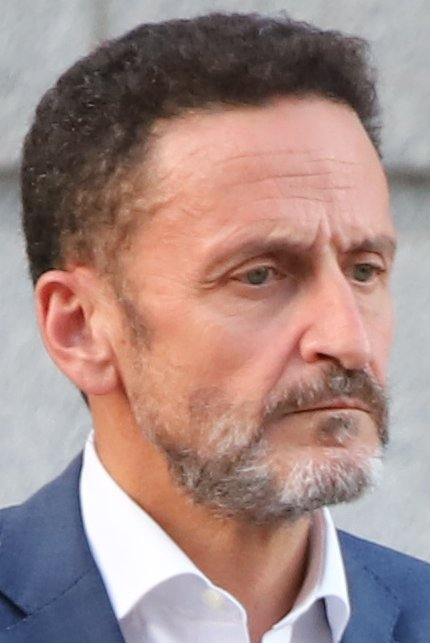
	First party	Second party	Third party
Leader	Isabel Díaz Ayuso	Mónica García	Ángel Gabilondo
Party	PP	Más Madrid	PSOE
Leader since	13 January 2019	10 July 2020	21 February 2015
Last election	30 seats, 22.2%	20 seats, 14.7%	37 seats, 27.3%
Seats won	65	24	24
Seat change	▲35	▲4	▼13
Popular vote	1,631,608	619,215	612,622
Percentage	44.8%	17.0%	16.8%
Swing	▲22.6 pp	▲2.3 pp	▼10.5 pp
	Fourth party	Fifth party	Sixth party
Leader	Rocío Monasterio	Pablo Iglesias	Edmundo Bal
Party	Vox	Podemos–IU	Cs
Leader since	18 April 2019	28 March 2021	22 March 2021
Last election	12 seats, 8.9%	7 seats, 5.6%	26 seats, 19.5%
Seats won	13	10	0
Seat change	▲1	▲3	▼26
Popular vote	333,403	263,871	130,237
Percentage	9.1%	7.2%	3.6%
Swing	▲0.2 pp	▲1.6 pp	▼15.9 pp
President before election
Isabel Díaz Ayuso
PP
President after election
Isabel Díaz Ayuso
PP

A regional election was held in the Community of Madrid on 4 May 2021 to elect the 12th Assembly of the autonomous community. All 136 seats in the Assembly were up for election. This marked the first time that a regional premier in Madrid made use of the presidential prerogative to call an early election.

On 10 March 2021 after the unexpected announcement by the Spanish Socialist Workers' Party (PSOE) and Citizens (Cs) of moves to bring down People's Party-led governments in the Region of Murcia, Madrilenian president Isabel Díaz Ayuso broke her alliance with Cs and called a snap election in the Community of Madrid for 4 May, a move which she had unsuccessfully attempted twice in 2020. Despite both the PSOE and Más Madrid preventively filing motions of no confidence in an attempt to thwart Ayuso's move, the next day the Assembly's bureau provisionally acknowledged the parliamentary dissolution, though it announced a complaint against Ayuso's election call. Subsequently, the second deputy prime minister of Spain and Unidas Podemos national leader, Pablo Iglesias, announced he would be stepping down from his national cabinet posts in order to run as his alliance's leading candidate in the regional election.

The election resulted in a landslide victory for Ayuso's PP, which fell four seats short of an overall majority and secured more votes and seats than all three main leftist parties combined, in what was the best performance since 2011. The vote share of both the PSOE and Cs collapsed, with the former being surpassed by Más Madrid and the latter failing to win any seats. In the election aftermath, Iglesias announced his farewell from Spanish politics and his resignation from all of his political and institutional posts. The strong result for the PP, fueled by Ayuso's controversial personality and charisma as well as a general feeling of exhaustion in the region in response to restrictions enforced to curb the COVID-19 pandemic by the Spanish government of Pedro Sánchez, meant that it was not dependent on the far-right Vox's explicit support to form a government, though it still required its confidence-and-supply to pass laws. The election marked the best result ever in number of votes for both the PP and Más Madrid, as well as the highest turnout in a regional election to date.

== Overview ==
Under the 1983 Statute of Autonomy, the Assembly of Madrid was the unicameral legislature of the homonymous autonomous community, having legislative power in devolved matters, as well as the ability to grant or withdraw confidence from a regional president. The electoral and procedural rules were supplemented by national law provisions.

=== Date ===
The term of the Assembly of Madrid expired four years after the date of its previous ordinary election, with election day being fixed for the fourth Sunday of May every four years. The election decree was required to be issued no later than 54 days before the scheduled election date and published on the following day in the Official Gazette of the Community of Madrid (BOCM). The previous election was held on 26 May 2019, setting the date for election day on the fourth Sunday of May four years later, which was 28 May 2023.

The regional president had the prerogative to dissolve the Assembly of Madrid at any given time and call a snap election, provided that no motion of no confidence was in process, no nationwide election had been called and that dissolution did not occur either during the first legislative session or during the last year of parliament before its planned expiration, nor before one year after a previous one. In the event of an investiture process failing to elect a regional president within a two-month period from the first ballot, the Assembly was to be automatically dissolved and a fresh election called, which was to be held on the first Sunday 54 days after the call. Any snap election held as a result of these circumstances did not alter the date of the chamber's next ordinary election, with elected lawmakers serving the remainder of its original four-year term.

Throughout 2020, as a result of both the growing divisions between the two governing coalition partners and the perceived likelihood of a motion of no confidence being tabled by the opposition over Díaz Ayuso's perceived mismanagement of the COVID-19 pandemic in the Community of Madrid, Ayuso considered calling a snap election in the region. A first attempt was reportedly aborted by her party's national leadership in June 2020, but in September, it was reported that Ayuso intended for a regional election in Madrid to be held concurrently with the announced Catalan regional election by Catalan president Quim Torra, tentatively scheduled for some point in late 2020 or early 2021. Ayuso herself seemed to cast off such rumours through her Twitter account.

On 10 March 2021, both the Spanish Socialist Workers' Party (PSOE) and Citizens (Cs) announced an agreement under which they would jointly bring down the People's Party (PP) governments in the city and the region of Murcia, where both PP and Cs had been in government since the 2019 local and regional elections. This prompted President Ayuso to immediately end her alliance with Cs and call a snap regional election for 4 May 2021, wary of the Cs branch in Madrid being intent on bringing her down in a similar fashion. The PSOE and Más Madrid tried to prevent the election call by filling one no-confidence motion each. Because the election decree does not enter into force until the moment of its publication, the issue was raised on which decision should be legally considered to have occurred first, since an election cannot be called while the process of a motion of no confidence is underway. Upon the publication of the dissolution decree the next day, the Assembly's bureau provisionally acknowledged the election call but announced it would study filling a complaint against it.

The Assembly of Madrid was officially dissolved on 11 March 2021 with the publication of the corresponding decree in the BOCM, setting election day for 4 May and scheduling for the chamber to reconvene on 8 June.

=== Electoral system ===
Voting for the Assembly was based on universal suffrage, comprising all Spanish nationals over 18 years of age, registered in the Community of Madrid and with full political rights, provided that they had not been deprived of the right to vote by a final sentence. Additionally, non-resident citizens were required to apply for voting, a system known as "begged" voting (Spanish: Voto rogado).

The Assembly of Madrid had one seat per 50,000 inhabitants or fraction above 25,000. All were elected in a single multi-member constituency—corresponding to the autonomous community's territory—using the D'Hondt method and closed-list proportional voting, with a five percent-threshold of valid votes (including blank ballots) regionally. As a result of the aforementioned allocation, the Assembly was entitled to 136 seats, based on the official population figures resulting from the latest revision of the municipal register (as of 1 January 2020).

The law did not provide for by-elections to fill vacant seats; instead, any vacancies arising after the proclamation of candidates and during the legislative term were filled by the next candidates on the party lists or, when required, by designated substitutes.

=== Outgoing parliament ===
The table below shows the composition of the parliamentary groups in the chamber at the time of dissolution.

Parliamentary composition in March 2021
Groups	Parties	Legislators	
Groups	Parties	Seats	Total
Socialist Parliamentary Group	PSOE	37	37
People's Parliamentary Group	PP	30	30
Citizens's Parliamentary Group	Cs	26	26
More Madrid Parliamentary Group	Más Madrid	18	20
More Madrid Parliamentary Group	Equo	2	20
Vox Parliamentary Group in Madrid	Vox	12	12
United We Can–United Left– Stand Up Madrid Parliamentary Group	Podemos	5	7
United We Can–United Left– Stand Up Madrid Parliamentary Group	IU–M	2	7

== Parties and candidates ==
The electoral law allowed for parties and federations registered in the interior ministry, alliances and groupings of electors to present lists of candidates. Parties and federations intending to form an alliance were required to inform the relevant electoral commission within 10 days of the election call, whereas groupings of electors needed to secure the signature of at least 0.5 percent of the electorate in the Community of Madrid, disallowing electors from signing for more than one list. Additionally, a balanced composition of men and women was required in the electoral lists, so that candidates of either sex made up at least 40 percent of the total composition.

Below is a list of the main parties and alliances which contested the election:

Candidacy	Parties and alliances	Leading candidate	Ideology	Previous result		Gov.	Ref.
Candidacy	Parties and alliances	Leading candidate	Ideology	Vote %	Seats	Gov.	Ref.
PSOE	List: Spanish Socialist Workers' Party (PSOE)	Ángel Gabilondo	Social democracy	27.3%	37	No	
PP	List: People's Party (PP)	Isabel Díaz Ayuso	Conservatism; Christian democracy	22.2%	30	Yes	
Cs	List: Citizens–Party of the Citizenry (Cs)	Edmundo Bal	Liberalism	19.5%	26	No	
Más Madrid	List: More Madrid (Más Madrid); Greens Equo (Verdes Equo)	Mónica García	Progressivism; Participatory democracy Green politics	14.7%	20	No	
Vox	List: Vox (Vox)	Rocío Monasterio	Right-wing populism Ultranationalism; National conservatism	8.9%	12	No	
Podemos–IU	List: We Can (Podemos); United Left–Madrid (IU–M) – Communist Party of Madrid (PCM) – The Dawn Marxist Organization (La Aurora (OM)) – Republican Left (IR)	Pablo Iglesias	Left-wing populism Direct democracy Democratic socialism	5.6%	7	No	

== Campaign ==
=== Timetable ===
The key dates are listed below (all times are CET):

- 10 March: The election decree is issued with the countersign of the president, after deliberation in the Council of Government.
- 11 March: Formal dissolution of parliament and start of prohibition period on the inauguration of public works, services or projects.
- 14 March: Initial constitution of provincial and zone electoral commissions with judicial members.
- 17 March: Division of constituencies into polling sections and stations.
- 21 March: Deadline for parties and federations to report on their electoral alliances.
- 24 March: Deadline for electoral register consultation for the purpose of possible corrections.
- 31 March: Deadline for parties, federations, alliances, and groupings of electors to present electoral lists.
- 2 April: Publication of submitted electoral lists in the Official Gazette of the Community of Madrid (BOCM).
- 5 April: Deadline for non-resident citizens (electors residing abroad (CERA) and citizens temporarily absent from Spain) to apply for voting.
- 7 April: Official proclamation of validly submitted electoral lists.
- 8 April: Publication of proclaimed electoral lists in the BOCM.
- 9 April: Deadline for the selection of polling station members by sortition.
- 17 April: Deadline for the appointment of non-judicial members to provincial and zone electoral commissions.
- 18 April: Official start of electoral campaigning.
- 22 April: Deadline to apply for postal voting (extended to 25 April by the Central Electoral Commission).
- 27 April: Start of legal ban on electoral opinion polling publication; deadline for CERA citizens to vote by mail.
- 30 April: Deadline for postal and temporarily absent voting (extended to 1 May by the Central Electoral Commission).
- 2 May: Last day of electoral campaigning; deadline for CERA voting.
- 3 May: Official election silence ("reflection day").
- 4 May: Election day (polling stations open at 9 am and close at 8 pm or once voters present in a queue at/outside the polling station at 8 pm have cast their vote); provisional vote counting.
- 7 May: Start of general vote counting, including CERA votes.
- 10 May: Deadline for the general vote counting.
- 19 May: Deadline for the proclamation of elected members.
- 13 June: Deadline for the reconvening of parliament (date determined by the election decree, which for the 2021 election was set for 8 June).
- 28 June: Deadline for the publication of definitive election results in the BOCM.

=== Party slogans ===
Party or alliance	Original slogan	English translation	Ref.
PSOE	« Hazlo por Madrid » « No es solo Madrid. Es la democracia » (Note: Following the Cadena SER incident and Vox's increasingly aggressive campaigning style, the PSOE rebranded its slogan as "It is not just Madrid. It is democracy" (Spanish: No es solo Madrid. Es la democracia).)	"Do it for Madrid" "It is not just Madrid. It is democracy"	
PP	« Libertad »	"Freedom"	
Cs	« Elige centro »	"Choose centre"	
Más Madrid	« Por lo que de verdad importa »	"For what really matters"	
Vox	« Protege Madrid »	"Protect Madrid"	
Podemos–IU	« Que hable la mayoría »	"Let the majority speak"	

=== Events and issues ===
Right after the announcement of fresh elections, President Díaz Ayuso launched the "Socialism or freedom" and "Communism or freedom" slogans, as a derogatory reference to the policies that left-of-centre parties would apply should they reach the government. Second deputy prime minister of the Spanish government Pablo Iglesias announced that he would be contesting the regional election as lead candidate for his coalition, Unidas Podemos. After an attempt to contest the election in an electoral alliance with Más Madrid, the latter's candidate Mónica García rejected it.

In March 2021, Toni Cantó, former leader of Citizens in the Valencian Community, announced that he would join Díaz Ayuso's candidacy, which was accepted by the Electoral Commission. However, on 11 April the courts banned Cantó from the list for not complying with the needed requirements of being registered in the Community of Madrid ahead of the election call.

=== Debates ===
2021 Madrilenian regional election debates
Date	Organizer(s)	Moderator(s)	P Present (Note: Denotes a main invitee attending the event.) S Surrogate (Note: Denotes a main invitee not attending the event, sending a surrogate in their place.) A Absent invitee AB Abandoned (Note: Denotes an invitee attending the event but abandoning it while underway.)							
Date	Organizer(s)	Moderator(s)	PSOE	PP	Cs	MM	Vox	UP	Audience	Ref.
14 April	Cuatro (Todo es Mentira) (Note: Under 30's debate.)	Risto Mejide	P Guardiola	P Núñez	P Patilla	P Rubiño	A	P Verstrynge	5.4% (634,000) (Note: Broadcast nationwide)	
21 April	Telemadrid	María Rey; Jon Ariztimuño	P Gabilondo	P Ayuso	P Bal	P García	P Monasterio	P Iglesias	36.3% (910,000) (Note: In the Community of Madrid, the debate was broadcast on laSexta (12.6%, 316,000), Telemadrid (10%, 251,000), La 1 (9.9%, 247,000), LaOtra (2.3%, 57,000), Trece (1%, 26,000) and 24 Horas (0.5%,13.000). Nationwide, the debate was broadcast on laSexta, La 1, Trece and 24 Horas, obtaining a combined audience of 19% (3,325,000).)	
23 April	Cadena SER	Àngels Barceló	AB; Gabilondo	A	P Bal	AB; García	P Monasterio	AB; Iglesias	—	
26 April	laSexta	Ana Pastor	Cancelled							
29 April	RTVE	Undetermined	Cancelled							

Opinion polls

Candidate viewed as "performing best" or "most convincing" in each debate
Debate	Polling firm/Commissioner	PSOE	PP	Cs	MM	Vox	UP	None
21 April	Sigma Dos/Telemadrid	10.6	35.5	6.6	23.4	8.5	15.4	–
21 April	Metroscopia/El País	6.0	22.0	5.0	15.0	5.0	9.0	6.0

On 23 April, and following a death threat of unknown origin in the form of a menacing mail with four rifle bullets issued to Pablo Iglesias, Interior ministry Fernando Grande-Marlaska and Civil Guard director general María Gámez, a clash ensued between Iglesias and far-right Vox candidate Rocío Monasterio in the Cadena SER debate over the latter's refusal to explicitly condemn the incident. Monasterio accused Iglesias of hypocrisy for refusing to condemn the assaults that Vox members had suffered on the campaign trail, while adding that "Spaniards just don't believe anything [the Spanish government] says" and casting doubts on the veracity of the threat. This prompted Iglesias to walk out of the debate as he argued it risked "whitewashing fascism" and normalizing their arguments, which was followed by PSOE and Más Madrid candidates doing likewise shortly thereafter. All three announced their pledge to democracy and their unwillingness to participate in any further debate with Vox unless the party explicitly condemned the threats. Immediately following Iglesias's exit from the debate, the PP of incumbent president Isabel Díaz Ayuso—who was notoriously absent from the debate—commented on the incident by publishing a controversial tweet which read as "Iglesias, close the door behind you. 4 May". The tweet was deleted shortly after as a result of the media backlash it provoked, as it was seen as showing the party as supportive of Vox's stance not to condemn the death threat.

From the Cadena SER debate afterwards, the course of the campaign changed. Vox intensified its aggressive campaigning style: after a controversial ad aimed at criminalizing migrant unaccompanied minors, which received criticism for its alleged "racism", as well as Monasterio's performance in the debates being regarded as overtly disrespectful and undemocratic, Vox leader Santiago Abascal overtly questioned the veracity of the death threats and accused Iglesias of being a "crybaby and coward" as well as "fucking spoiled child of Spanish politics". PSOE, Más Madrid and Unidas Podemos regarded Vox's stance as "fascist" and unified their political positions, coordinating themselves in order to turn around the PP's campaign narrative of "communism or freedom" into a "democracy or fascism" message by highlighting the menace of an increasingly radical Vox being the government kingmaker in the aftermath of the election. Until then running a comfortable campaign propelled by favourable opinion polls, Vox's aggressivity placed Ayuso and her PP in a difficult position, as they were now required to distance themselves from the far-right party or face a possible backlash from the left-from-centre electorate.

== Opinion polls ==
The tables below list opinion polling results in reverse chronological order, showing the most recent first and using the dates when the survey fieldwork was done, as opposed to the date of publication. Where the fieldwork dates are unknown, the date of publication is given instead. The highest percentage figure in each polling survey is displayed with its background shaded in the leading party's colour. If a tie ensues, this is applied to the figures with the highest percentages. The "Lead" column on the right shows the percentage-point difference between the parties with the highest percentages in a poll.

=== Graphical summary ===
Local regression trend line of poll results from 26 May 2019 to 4 May 2021, with each line corresponding to a political party.

=== Voting intention estimates ===
The table below lists weighted voting intention estimates. Refusals are generally excluded from the party vote percentages, while question wording and the treatment of "don't know" responses and those not intending to vote may vary between polling organisations. When available, seat projections determined by the polling organisations are displayed below (or in place of) the percentages in a smaller font; 69 seats were required for an absolute majority in the Assembly of Madrid (67 in the 2019 election).

Color key:

Poll conducted after legal ban on opinion polls

Polling firm/Commissioner	Fieldwork date	Sample size	Turnout	PSOE	PP	Cs	Más Madrid	Vox	Unidas Podemos	Unidas Podemos Más Madrid	Lead
2021 regional election	4 May 2021	—N/a	71.7	16.8; 24	44.8; 65	3.6; 0	17.0; 24	9.1; 13	7.2; 10	–	27.8
Demoscopia y Servicios/ESdiario	4 May 2021	?	?	19.1; 27	44.2; 64	3.5; 0	17.4; 25	7.5; 10	7.2; 10	–	25.1
Hamalgama Métrica/Okdiario	4 May 2021	1,000	?	20.3; 29	42.1; 61	2.9; 0	15.5; 22	9.6; 14	7.5; 10	–	21.8
SocioMétrica/El Español	4 May 2021	?	?	19.3; 26/29	40.0; 58/62	4.0; 0/7	19.8; 26/29	10.6; 13/15	5.2; 0/8	–	20.2
GAD3/RTVE–Telemadrid	4 May 2021	8,500	?	18.4; 25/28	43.7; 62/65	3.2; 0	16.1; 21/24	9.2; 12/14	7.9; 10/11	–	25.3
NC Report/La Razón	2–4 May 2021	1,000	?	20.9; 30	41.9; 61	3.3; 0	15.7; 22	8.7; 12	7.9; 11	–	21.0
ElectoPanel/Electomanía	2 May 2021	2,000	?	19.9; 29	41.5; 60	3.9; 0	17.0; 24	9.4; 13	7.1; 10	–	21.6
ElectoPanel/Electomanía	1–2 May 2021	2,000	?	19.7; 28	41.3; 60	3.7; 0	17.3; 25	9.4; 13	7.2; 10	–	21.6
ElectoPanel/Electomanía	30 Apr–1 May 2021	1,582	?	20.3; 30	41.2; 60	3.7; 0	17.0; 24	9.3; 13	7.1; 9	–	20.9
ElectoPanel/Electomanía	29–30 Apr 2021	1,000	?	20.7; 30	41.5; 60	3.8; 0	16.6; 24	9.2; 13	6.9; 9	–	20.8
ElectoPanel/Electomanía	29 Apr 2021	400	?	21.2; 30	41.3; 60	3.7; 0	16.5; 24	9.3; 13	6.6; 9	–	20.1
SyM Consulting	28 Apr 2021	2,419	72.6	21.3; 30/31	41.9; 60/61	2.3; 0	14.3; 20	11.5; 16	6.9; 9	–	20.6
SW Demoscopia/El Plural	28 Apr 2021	2,502	75	22.6; 31/34	39.4; 56/59	4.3; 0	17.8; 25/27	7.2; 9/12	7.1; 9/11	–	16.8
Hamalgama Métrica/Okdiario	26–28 Apr 2021	1,000	?	21.9; 31	42.2; 61	3.3; 0	14.9; 21	9.1; 13	7.6; 10	–	20.3
Demoscopia y Servicios/ESdiario	26–28 Apr 2021	1,000	72.8	20.6; 30	41.1; 59	3.6; 0	16.4; 23	9.3; 13	7.9; 11	–	20.5
ElectoPanel/Electomanía	25–28 Apr 2021	2,280	?	21.2; 30	41.5; 60	3.6; 0	16.0; 23	9.3; 13	6.9; 10	–	20.3
SocioMétrica/El Español	12–28 Apr 2021	1,500	?	19.4; 26/28	41.9; 58/61	4.5; 0/7	16.4; 22/24	10.1; 13/15	6.8; 9	–	22.5
Ágora Integral/Canarias Ahora	27 Apr 2021	1,000	?	23.1; 32/33	40.2; 57/58	3.0; 0	16.9; 24/25	8.2; 11/12	7.8; 11	–	17.1
Celeste-Tel/Onda Cero	23–27 Apr 2021	1,100	?	22.0; 32	41.3; 60	3.7; 0	15.1; 21	8.6; 12	7.6; 11	–	19.3
NC Report/La Razón	23–27 Apr 2021	1,000	64.8	23.3; 33	41.3; 59	3.6; 0	14.8; 21	8.7; 12	7.8; 11	–	18.0
GAD3/ABC	23–26 Apr 2021	1,000	76	19.7; 27/29	43.4; 62/63	2.8; 0	14.4; 20/21	9.8; 14	8.2; 11	–	23.7
DYM/Henneo	22–26 Apr 2021	800	?	21.4; 31	38.7; 56	4.6; 0	17.2; 25	10.9; 15	6.1; 9	–	17.3
Metroscopia/El País	20–26 Apr 2021	3,000	66–68	19.7; 28	41.3; 59	3.0; 0	17.6; 25	9.4; 13	7.8; 11	–	21.6
Sigma Dos/El Mundo	19–26 Apr 2021	1,600	75	21.4; 30/31	41.0; 59	4.1; 0	16.5; 23/24	8.4; 12	8.1; 11	–	19.6
Ipsos	22–25 Apr 2021	1,000	77.7	21.0; 25/33	36.7; 47/55	6.2; 0/9	18.7; 22/28	11.2; 12/18	6.2; 0/9	–	15.7
ElectoPanel/Electomanía	23–24 Apr 2021	?	?	23.7; 34	41.5; 60	3.5; 0	14.3; 20	8.7; 12	7.0; 10	–	17.8
InvyMark/laSexta	22–24 Apr 2021	2,400	?	22.9; 33	43.4; 63	3.3; 0	13.6; 19	8.9; 12	6.8; 9	–	20.5
NC Report/La Razón	21–24 Apr 2021	1,000	64.8	23.5; 33	41.6; 60	2.8; 0	14.4; 20	8.8; 12	8.2; 11	–	18.1
KeyData/Público	22 Apr 2021	?	69.7	23.2; 34	41.5; 60	3.5; 0	13.8; 20	9.0; 12	7.2; 10	–	18.3
ElectoPanel/Electomanía	21–22 Apr 2021	2,000	?	23.1; 33	41.8; 61	3.5; 0	14.2; 20	8.7; 12	7.2; 10	–	18.7
Hamalgama Métrica/Okdiario	20–22 Apr 2021	1,000	?	23.4; 33	43.3; 62	2.8; 0	13.4; 19	8.6; 12	7.6; 10	–	19.9
Ágora Integral/Canarias Ahora	19–22 Apr 2021	?	71	23.7; 33/34	40.4; 57/58	2.9; 0	15.5; 22/23	8.0; 11	8.5; 12	–	16.7
SocioMétrica/El Español	5–22 Apr 2021	1,500	?	22.7; 31	40.2; 56	5.2; 7	13.9; 19	10.6; 15	6.8; 8	–	17.5
ElectoPanel/Electomanía	18–21 Apr 2021	2,315	?	23.8; 34	41.9; 61	3.7; 0	12.9; 18	8.4; 12	7.8; 11	–	18.1
CIS	19–20 Apr 2021	2,304	?	23.4; 34/36	36.7; 54/56	4.6; 0	15.1; 22/24	8.2; 11/13	8.4; 11/13	–	13.3
Demoscopia y Servicios/ESdiario	17–20 Apr 2021	1,000	72.1	23.1; 33	43.5; 63	3.7; 0	13.4; 19	7.9; 11	7.2; 10	–	20.4
Sigma Dos/El Mundo	14–20 Apr 2021	1,100	75.0	22.6; 31/32	40.5; 56/59	4.2; 0/7	15.1; 21/23	9.1; 12	7.2; 9/10	–	17.9
SyM Consulting	18–19 Apr 2021	1,538	70.5	23.7; 34	39.6; 57	3.1; 0	13.3; 19	11.7; 16/17	6.8; 9/10	–	15.9
Celeste-Tel/Onda Cero	16–19 Apr 2021	1,100	65.3	23.0; 32	41.8; 61	4.3; 0	14.3; 21	8.4; 12	7.3; 10	–	18.8
ElectoPanel/Electomanía	15–17 Apr 2021	?	?	24.9; 36	41.8; 61	4.0; 0	11.9; 17	7.9; 11	7.9; 11	–	18.1
Top Position	14–17 Apr 2021	1,600	?	24.9; 36	41.6; 60	3.7; 0	12.5; 18	8.2; 12	7.5; 10	–	16.7
NC Report/La Razón	14–17 Apr 2021	1,000	64.4	23.6; 34	41.9; 61	4.8; 0	12.7; 18	8.1; 11	8.2; 12	–	18.3
Ágora Integral/Canarias Ahora	12–16 Apr 2021	1,000	?	26.5; 37/38	41.1; 58/59	3.1; 0	13.5; 19/20	7.2; 10	7.7; 11	–	14.6
GAD3/NIUS	14–15 Apr 2021	1,002	?	21.6; 31	44.1; 64	3.1; 0	13.9; 20	8.2; 12	6.5; 9	–	22.5
Hamalgama Métrica/Okdiario	13–15 Apr 2021	1,000	?	25.0; 35	43.1; 62	3.0; 0	12.5; 18	8.0; 11	7.2; 10	–	18.1
Sigma Dos/El Mundo	12–15 Apr 2021	1,000	?	21.1; 29/31	40.9; 56/60	4.5; 0/7	14.9; 20/22	9.4; 13/14	8.1; 11/12	–	19.8
ElectoPanel/Electomanía	11–14 Apr 2021	2,217	?	25.3; 37	41.5; 60	3.8; 0	11.3; 16	8.1; 11	8.3; 12	–	16.2
SocioMétrica/El Español	29 Mar–14 Apr 2021	1,500	?	23.1; 32	39.6; 55	5.4; 7	13.1; 18	11.1; 15	7.0; 9	–	16.5
Celeste-Tel/Onda Cero	13 Apr 2021	?	68.0	25.2; 36	41.7; 61	4.5; 0	12.5; 18	8.2; 11	7.2; 10	–	16.5
GESOP/El Periódico	8–13 Apr 2021	800	?	23.0; 33/34	39.3; 56/57	3.4; 0	16.0; 23/24	10.0; 13/14	6.3; 9/10	–	16.3
SyM Consulting	9–11 Apr 2021	1,686	72.7	24.7; 35	41.4; 59/60	2.8; 0	11.8; 16/17	10.4; 15	7.1; 10	–	16.7
ElectoPanel/Electomanía	8–10 Apr 2021	?	?	25.8; 37	41.2; 60	3.8; 0	11.0; 16	8.1; 11	8.5; 12	–	15.4
NC Report/La Razón	7–10 Apr 2021	1,000	64.6	25.5; 35	41.7; 58	5.1; 7	10.3; 14	7.9; 10	8.6; 12	–	16.2
Hamalgama Métrica/Okdiario	6–9 Apr 2021	1,000	66.9	27.3; 39	41.6; 60	4.7; 0	12.6; 18	6.2; 9	7.0; 10	–	14.3
GAD3/ABC	5–7 Apr 2021	1,003	71	23.2; 33/34	43.3; 62/63	2.9; 0	12.8; 17/19	8.4; 12	7.0; 10	–	20.1
ElectoPanel/Electomanía	2–7 Apr 2021	2,105	?	25.9; 37	41.2; 60	3.5; 0	10.4; 15	8.5; 12	8.7; 12	–	15.3
SocioMétrica/El Español	22 Mar–7 Apr 2021	1,500	?	23.3; 32	38.8; 54	5.1; 7	13.8; 19	9.9; 14	7.7; 10	–	15.5
KeyData/Público	6 Apr 2021	?	?	25.1; 37	39.8; 59	4.2; 0	11.5; 16	8.9; 13	8.3; 11	–	14.7
ElectoPanel/Electomanía	25 Mar–1 Apr 2021	?	?	26.2; 38	40.6; 59	3.6; 0	9.9; 14	9.0; 13	8.8; 12	–	14.4
SyM Consulting	29–31 Mar 2021	1,527	77.9	26.9; 39/40	37.7; 55	4.4; 0	11.0; 16	11.6; 16/17	6.4; 9	–	10.8
SocioMétrica/El Español	15–31 Mar 2021	1,500	?	22.7; 31	39.6; 55	5.3; 7	13.2; 18	11.0; 15	7.5; 10	–	16.9
Sigma Dos/El Mundo	26–30 Mar 2021	1,104	?	22.8; 33/35	42.8; 61/62	4.1; 0	13.3; 18/20	7.5; 10/11	8.0; 11/12	–	20.0
Celeste-Tel/Onda Cero	23–29 Mar 2021	1,100	66.6	26.8; 37	39.2; 54	5.2; 7	10.0; 14	9.9; 13	8.2; 11	–	12.4
CIS	19–28 Mar 2021	4,124	?	25.3; 37	39.2; 58	4.4; 0	14.8; 21	5.4; 8	8.7; 12	–	13.9
NC Report/La Razón	14–27 Mar 2021	1,000	61.4	26.0; 36	40.1; 56	5.1; 7	9.5; 13	9.1; 12	9.2; 12	–	14.1
InvyMark/laSexta	22–26 Mar 2021	2,400	?	26.3; 38	40.4; 59	4.6; 0	10.6; 15	9.5; 14	7.3; 10	–	14.1
ElectoPanel/Electomanía	18–24 Mar 2021	2,417	?	26.3; 38	40.6; 59	2.8; 0	9.6; 13	9.4; 13	9.4; 13	–	14.3
SocioMétrica/El Español	15–24 Mar 2021	1,500	?	22.1; 31	38.1; 53	5.1; 7	12.1; 17	12.4; 17	7.9; 11	–	16.0
Sigma Dos/Antena 3	23 Mar 2021	?	?	25.1; 34/37	40.9; 56/60	5.1; 0/7	11.5; 15/17	8.8; 12/13	7.7; 10/11	–	15.8
SyM Consulting	21–22 Mar 2021	1,376	70.1	27.2; 40	35.6; 52/53	4.6; 0	12.0; 17/18	11.1; 16	7.2; 10	–	8.4
NC Report/La Razón	17–20 Mar 2021	1,000	61.1	26.3; 37	39.6; 55	5.4; 7	9.6; 13	9.2; 12	8.9; 12	–	13.3
ElectoPanel/Electomanía	16–17 Mar 2021	?	?	26.6; 38	41.2; 59	2.0; 0	9.7; 13	9.3; 13	9.3; 13	–	14.6
Hamalgama Métrica/Okdiario	16–17 Mar 2021	1,000	?	27.1; 38	39.1; 54	5.3; 7	10.3; 14	10.5; 14	7.0; 9	–	12.0
DYM/Henneo	15–17 Mar 2021	800	?	23.2; 31/33	36.5; 50/53	6.2; 7/8	13.1; 18/19	10.8; 14/16	8.7; 11/12	–	13.3
SocioMétrica/El Español	15–16 Mar 2021	1,200	?	21.8; 30	36.2; 51	5.5; 7	11.3; 16	12.3; 17	11.0; 15	–	14.2
GAD3/Telecinco	15–16 Mar 2021	1,003	72	24.8; 35/37	42.1; 60/62	1.9; 0	9.2; 13/14	7.9; 10/12	10.9; 14/15	–	17.3
SyM Consulting	15 Mar 2021	1,428	75.3	22.5; 32	36.0; 51/52	2.4; 0	11.0; 15	16.7; 24	9.6; 13/14	–	13.5
ElectoPanel/Electomanía	15 Mar 2021	2,400	?	23.3; 33	45.2; 64	1.8; 0	(Note: Within a Unidas Podemos+Más Madrid alliance.)	7.4; 10		20.9; 29	21.9
ElectoPanel/Electomanía	15 Mar 2021	2,400	?	26.7; 38	41.1; 59	2.7; 0	10.8; 15	9.2; 13	8.0; 11	–	14.4
Sigma Dos/El Mundo	12–15 Mar 2021	1,200	?	27.5; 37/38	39.5; 55/56	5.6; 6/7	9.8; 13/14	9.4; 12/13	6.9; 9/10	–	12.0
DYM/Henneo	11–15 Mar 2021	809	?	27.7	32.9	6.6	15.1	12.4	4.5	–	5.2
NC Report/La Razón	10–13 Mar 2021	1,000	60.7	27.6; 38	33.2; 46	6.3; 8	12.8; 18	13.7; 19	5.2; 7	–	5.6
GAD3/ABC	10–12 Mar 2021	1,003	?	27.8; 39/41	39.6; 57/59	3.1; 0	11.1; 15/17	10.5; 14/16	5.1; 7	–	11.8
Demoscopia y Servicios/ESdiario	11 Mar 2021	820	?	28.2; 39	31.3; 44	5.8; 8	12.5; 17	15.2; 21	5.5; 7	–	3.1
Metroscopia/El Confidencial	10–11 Mar 2021	900	63	28.4; 41/43	41.0; 59/63	4.0; 0	11.0; 16	9.3; 13/14	4.9; 0/7	–	12.6
SyM Consulting	10 Mar 2021	1,428	72.8	25.5; 36	28.8; 40/41	5.3; 7	11.3; 15/16	21.7; 30	5.2; 7	–	3.3
Hamalgama Métrica/Okdiario	10 Mar 2021	900	?	26.7; 36	29.9; 40	9.0; 12	11.9; 16	15.6; 21	5.2; 7	–	3.2
ElectoPanel/Electomanía	10 Mar 2021	2,400	?	27.2; 40	33.2; 48	4.4; 0	14.6; 21	13.7; 20	5.3; 7	–	6.0
Celeste-Tel/Cs	2–9 Mar 2021	800	?	? 37	? 39	? 16	? 18	? 15	? 7	–	?
KeyData/Público	6 Nov 2020	?	?	26.6; 36	28.8; 39	11.6; 15	13.2; 18	12.5; 17	5.5; 7	–	2.2
SocioMétrica/El Español	15–17 Oct 2020	1,310	?	25.9; 35	26.8; 36	12.3; 16	13.1; 18	14.8; 20	5.2; 7	–	0.9
Hamalgama Métrica/Okdiario	9–12 Oct 2020	1,000	60.8	26.5; 36	32.8; 45	10.3; 14	12.4; 16	10.2; 14	5.6; 7	–	6.3
NC Report/La Razón	5–10 Oct 2020	1,000	58.6	26.9; 37	33.1; 45	12.3; 16	12.1; 16	8.7; 11	5.4; 7	–	6.2
ElectoPanel/Electomanía	1–9 Oct 2020	650	?	28.5; 39	33.7; 46	9.2; 12	12.7; 17	9.1; 12	5.1; 6	–	5.2
DYM/Henneo	5–7 Oct 2020	799	?	28.5; 38/39	24.3; 33	13.9; 18/19	14.0; 19	12.7; 17	5.1; 6	–	4.2
SyM Consulting	2–4 Oct 2020	1,319	71.0	25.0; 34	27.7; 37/38	9.1; 12	14.2; 19	16.2; 22	5.8; 7/8	–	2.7
ElectoPanel/Electomanía	2 Oct 2020	2,120	?	28.4; 39	33.4; 45	10.0; 13	10.8; 14	9.8; 13	6.5; 8	–	5.0
NC Report/La Razón	8–12 Sep 2020	1,000	59.2	27.4; 37	28.4; 39	14.0; 19	13.0; 17	9.4; 12	5.9; 8	–	1.0
ElectoPanel/Electomanía	31 Aug 2020	?	?	28.6; 39	30.9; 42	11.3; 15	9.5; 13	10.9; 14	7.2; 9	–	2.3
Sigma Dos/Telemadrid	19–22 Jun 2020	1,600	?	29.5; 40	31.9; 43	10.8; 14	10.3; 14	8.4; 11	7.8; 10	–	2.4
ElectoPanel/Electomanía	1 Apr–15 May 2020	?	?	28.5; 39	32.3; 44	10.2; 13	6.5; 8	10.2; 14	10.5; 14	–	3.8
Hamalgama Métrica/Okdiario	8–11 May 2020	1,000	?	27.4; 37	29.9; 40	13.9; 19	10.8; 14	9.8; 13	6.6; 9	–	2.5
GAD3/ABC	24–29 Apr 2020	1,006	?	27.9; 38	41.1; 57	7.6; 10	6.6; 9	7.7; 10	6.4; 8	–	13.2
SyM Consulting	20–23 Apr 2020	1,236	74.4	24.7; 33	27.3; 36	12.3; 16	8.9; 11/12	14.9; 19/20	10.0; 13	–	2.6
ElectoPanel/Electomanía	26–31 Mar 2020	800	?	30.3; 43	26.0; 37	11.3; 16	4.3; 0	11.8; 16	14.4; 20	–	4.3
November 2019 general election	10 Nov 2019	—N/a	70.6	26.9 (37)	24.9 (34)	9.1 (12)	5.7 (7)	18.3 (25)	13.0 (17)	–	2.0
Celeste-Tel	22–26 Jul 2019	1,000	65.0	28.3; 40	23.7; 34	20.1; 28	14.1; 20	7.6; 10	4.8; 0	–	4.6
NC Report/La Razón (Note: "Encuesta NC Report. Julio de 2019" (PDF). La Razón (in Spanish). 15 July 2019.)	9–13 Jul 2019	900	60.7	27.8; 38	26.0; 35	17.7; 24	14.2; 19	7.1; 9	5.1; 7	–	1.8
2019 regional election	26 May 2019	—N/a	64.3	27.3; 37	22.2; 30	19.4; 26	14.7; 20	8.9; 12	5.6; 7	–	5.1

=== Voting preferences ===
The table below lists raw, unweighted voting preferences.

Color key:

Poll conducted after legal ban on opinion polls

Polling firm/Commissioner	Fieldwork date	Sample size	PSOE	PP	Cs	Más Madrid	Vox	Unidas Podemos	Question	X mark	Lead
2021 regional election (Note: Does not include non-resident citizens.)	4 May 2021	—N/a	12.8	33.9	2.7	12.9	6.9	5.5	—N/a	23.7	21.0
CIS	27 Apr–3 May 2021	3,067	13.7	27.3	2.4	12.8	4.6	7.8	26.4	3.1	13.6
DYM/Henneo	22–26 Apr 2021	800	18.3	29.0	4.9	13.5	8.4	6.3	11.8	4.4	10.7
Metroscopia/El País	20–26 Apr 2021	3,000	16.0	33.0	3.0	14.0	6.0	9.0	–	–	17.0
CIS	19–20 Apr 2021	2,304	14.1	27.0	1.2	10.2	5.3	6.6	30.6	3.2	12.9
GESOP/El Periódico	8–13 Apr 2021	800	16.0	27.4	3.1	16.3	7.1	7.5	9.4	6.7	11.1
CIS	19–28 Mar 2021	4,124	17.2	29.9	2.0	10.1	3.3	7.6	25.1	3.4	12.7
DYM/Henneo	15–17 Mar 2021	800	18.0	29.2	6.1	6.4	8.6	9.2	13.3	3.7	11.2
DYM/Henneo	5–7 Oct 2020	799	22.0	15.4	12.2	6.6	11.6	5.8	26.4		6.6
November 2019 general election	10 Nov 2019	—N/a	19.9	18.4	6.7	4.2	13.6	9.6	—N/a	25.5	1.5
2019 regional election	26 May 2019	—N/a	18.5	15.1	13.2	9.9	6.0	3.8	—N/a	31.9	3.4

=== Victory preferences ===
The table below lists opinion polling on the victory preferences for each party in the event of a regional election taking place.

Color key:

Poll conducted after legal ban on opinion polls

Polling firm/Commissioner	Fieldwork date	Sample size	PSOE	PP	Cs	Más Madrid	Vox	Unidas Podemos	Other/ None	Question	Lead
CIS	27 Apr–3 May 2021	3,067	20.5	33.2	3.2	13.1	3.5	6.9	4.9	14.6	12.7
CIS	19–20 Apr 2021	2,304	22.9	32.8	2.8	11.6	4.1	6.2	5.5	14.0	9.9
CIS	19–28 Mar 2021	4,124	23.2	35.1	2.9	12.8	3.3	7.6	3.9	11.3	11.9

=== Victory likelihood ===
The table below lists opinion polling on the perceived likelihood of victory for each party in the event of a regional election taking place.

Color key:

Poll conducted after legal ban on opinion polls

Polling firm/Commissioner	Fieldwork date	Sample size	PSOE	PP	Más Madrid	Vox	Unidas Podemos	Other/ None	Question	Lead
CIS	27 Apr–3 May 2021	3,067	6.1	72.7	0.9	0.6	0.7	0.8	18.3	66.6
CIS	19–20 Apr 2021	2,304	8.8	69.6	–	–	0.6	1.5	19.5	60.8
CIS	19–28 Mar 2021	4,124	12.6	65.4	0.9	0.6	1.3	0.9	18.2	52.8

=== Preferred President ===
The table below lists opinion polling on leader preferences to become president of the Community of Madrid.

All candidates

Color key:

Poll conducted after legal ban on opinion polls

Polling firm/Commissioner	Fieldwork date	Sample size									Other/ None/ Not care	Question	Lead
Polling firm/Commissioner	Fieldwork date	Sample size	Gabilondo PSOE	Ayuso PP	Aguado Cs	Bal Cs	García Más Madrid	Monasterio Vox	Serra UP	Iglesias UP	Other/ None/ Not care	Question	Lead
CIS	27 Apr–3 May 2021	3,067	22.1	37.0	–	3.7	15.3	2.8	–	6.4	4.0	8.7	18.4
DYM/Henneo	22–26 Apr 2021	800	18.4	38.1	–	3.7	14.9	5.4	–	6.0	13.5		19.7
CIS	19–20 Apr 2021	2,304	23.8	37.8	–	2.5	11.5	3.0	–	7.2	4.4	9.8	14.0
GAD3/NIUS	14–15 Apr 2021	1,002	16.8	48.7	–	1.6	8.5	3.1	–	4.0	11.3	6.1	31.9
GESOP/El Periódico	8–13 Apr 2021	800	19.3	35.3	–	3.0	13.0	4.6	–	7.5	8.1	9.3	16.0
CIS	19–28 Mar 2021	4,124	22.3	38.6	–	2.2	10.2	2.2	–	8.1	7.1	9.4	16.3
InvyMark/laSexta	22–26 Mar 2021	2,400	27.5	49.1	–	2.5	4.9	5.9	–	5.8	–	4.3	21.6
DYM/Henneo	15–17 Mar 2021	800	15.5	37.1	3.7	–	6.3	3.9	–	11.5	22.0		21.6
SocioMétrica/El Español	15–16 Mar 2021	1,200	15.0	37.2	5.3	–	8.0	4.2	–	11.0	19.3		22.2
GAD3/Telecinco	15–16 Mar 2021	1,003	18.1	47.3	2.1	–	5.9	2.3	–	8.0	16.3		29.2
DYM/Henneo	11–15 Mar 2021	809	19.9	34.1	5.6	–	4.2	3.7	2.8	–	28.3		14.2

Gabilondo vs. Ayuso

Polling firm/Commissioner	Fieldwork date	Sample size			Other/ None/ Not care	Question	Lead
Polling firm/Commissioner	Fieldwork date	Sample size	Gabilondo PSOE	Ayuso PP	Other/ None/ Not care	Question	Lead
SW Demoscopia/El Plural	28 Apr 2021	2,502	46.7	53.3	–	–	6.6
InvyMark/laSexta	22–26 Mar 2021	2,400	39.0	57.4	–	3.6	18.4

Ayuso vs. García

Polling firm/Commissioner	Fieldwork date	Sample size			Other/ None/ Not care	Question	Lead
Polling firm/Commissioner	Fieldwork date	Sample size	Ayuso PP	García Más Madrid	Other/ None/ Not care	Question	Lead
SW Demoscopia/El Plural	28 Apr 2021	2,502	62.6	37.4	–	–	25.2

Ayuso vs. Iglesias

Polling firm/Commissioner	Fieldwork date	Sample size			Other/ None/ Not care	Question	Lead
Polling firm/Commissioner	Fieldwork date	Sample size	Ayuso PP	Iglesias UP	Other/ None/ Not care	Question	Lead
SW Demoscopia/El Plural	28 Apr 2021	2,502	75.7	24.3	–	–	51.4

== Voter turnout ==
The table below shows registered vote turnout on election day, without including voters from the Census of Absent-Residents (CERA).

Region	Time								
Region	13:00			19:00			20:00		
Region	2019	2021	+/–	2019	2021	+/–	2019	2021	+/–
Madrid	26.18%	28.43%	+2.25	58.13%	69.27%	+11.14	68.08%	76.25%	+8.17

== Results ==
=== Overall ===
← Summary of the 4 May 2021 Assembly of Madrid election results →
Parties and alliances	Popular vote			Seats	
Parties and alliances	Votes	%	±pp	Total	+/−
People's Party (PP)	1,631,608	44.76	+22.53	65	+35
More Madrid (Más Madrid)	619,215	16.99	+2.30	24	+4
Spanish Socialist Workers' Party (PSOE)	612,622	16.80	−10.51	24	−13
Vox (Vox)	333,403	9.15	+0.27	13	+1
United We Can (Podemos–IU)	263,871	7.24	+1.64	10	+3
Citizens–Party of the Citizenry (Cs)	130,237	3.57	−15.89	0	−26
Animalist Party Against Mistreatment of Animals (PACMA)	15,692	0.43	−0.33	0	±0
Blank Seats (EB)	2,765	0.08	New	0	±0
For a Fairer World (PUM+J)	2,563	0.07	−0.03	0	±0
Seniors in Action (3e en acción)	1,824	0.05	New	0	±0
Communist Party of the Workers of Spain (PCTE)	1,681	0.05	−0.03	0	±0
Zero Cuts–Castilian Party–Commoners'–Green Group (RC–PCAS–TC–GV–M)^{1}	1,679	0.05	−0.01	0	±0
Volt Spain (Volt)	1,573	0.04	New	0	±0
Centre Unity (UdeC)	1,481	0.04	New	0	±0
Self-employed Party (Partido Autónomos)	1,417	0.04	New	0	±0
Libertarian Party (P–LIB)	1,170	0.03	−0.01	0	±0
Spanish Phalanx of the CNSO (FE–JONS)	1,139	0.03	−0.04	0	±0
Humanist Party (PH)	1,014	0.03	−0.02	0	±0
Coalition for Communist Unity (PCOE–PCPE)	878	0.02	New	0	±0
Order and Law (POLE)	458	0.01	New	0	±0
Blank ballots	19,269	0.53	+0.07		
Total	3,645,559			136	+4
Valid votes	3,645,559	99.39	−0.19		
Invalid votes	22,247	0.61	+0.19		
Votes cast / turnout	3,667,806	71.74	+7.47		
Abstentions	1,445,007	28.26	−7.47		
Registered voters	5,112,813				
Sources
Footnotes: ^{1} Zero Cuts–Castilian Party–Commoners'–Green Group results are compared to Castilian Party–Commoners' Land: Pact totals in the 2019 election.

Popular vote
PP	44.76%
Más Madrid	16.99%
PSOE	16.80%
Vox	9.15%
Podemos–IU	7.24%
Cs	3.57%
Others	0.97%
Blank ballots	0.53%

Seats
PP	47.79%
Más Madrid	17.65%
PSOE	17.65%
Vox	9.56%
Podemos–IU	7.35%

== Aftermath ==
=== Government formation ===
The election saw a voter turnout of 71.7%, the highest for a Madrilenian regional election in history, surpassing the previous record in 1995. The People's Party (PP) saw a dramatic increase in support from 30 to 65 seats, four short of an overall majority on its own and greater than a prospective alliance of all three leftist parties in the Assembly, which would have only 58 seats. The PP victory, which doubled its share of the popular vote from its worst historical result in the previous election, came at the expense of Citizens (Cs), whose support collapsed from 19.5% to 3.6%, below the five percent threshold, as well as the Spanish Socialist Workers' Party (PSOE), which scored in third place in the region for the first time in history. The PSOE ran what was seen as a lackluster campaign and suffered from the strong performance of the progressive and ecologist Más Madrid. The far-right Vox party was able to resist the PP landslide and remain a decisive force in the government formation process; however, the heavy leverage obtained by the PP from its election result was likely to cast off any prospective coalition agreement between the two parties, allowing the formation of a minority government instead. Ayuso swept all municipalities but two in the region, winning historical PSOE-strongholds like Parla, which resisted the PP's landslides in 2007 and 2011.

Following the announcement of the results, President Isabel Díaz Ayuso claimed to have won the support of Madrilenians to keep applying her policies, whereas Vox candidate Rocío Monasterio announced that her party would allow Ayuso's investiture in order to "stop the left". Podemos candidate Pablo Iglesias announced his retirement from politics after claiming to have been turned into "a scapegoat" who "mobilizes the worst of those who hate democracy". Más Madrid candidate Mónica García accepted her new role as leader of the opposition to Ayuso's government following her second-place performance amid the collapse of Ángel Gabilondo's PSOE.

Investiture; Nomination of Isabel Díaz Ayuso (PP)
Ballot →	18 June 2021
Required majority →	69 out of 136
Yes: • PP (65); • Vox (12)	77 / 136
No: • Más Madrid (24); • PSOE (24); • Podemos–IU (9)	57 / 136
Abstentions	0 / 136
Absentees: • Vox (1); • Podemos–IU (1)	2 / 136

== Bibliography ==
- Ley Orgánica 3/1983, de 25 de febrero, de Estatuto de Autonomía de la Comunidad de Madrid (Organic Law 3/1983). Official State Gazette (in Spanish). 25 February 1983 [version as of 17 July 2010]. BOE-A-1983-6317.
- Ley Orgánica 5/1985, de 19 de junio, del Régimen Electoral General (Organic Law 5/1985). Official State Gazette (in Spanish). 19 June 1985 [version as of 25 June 2019]. BOE-A-1985-11672.
- Ley 11/1986, de 16 de diciembre, Electoral de la Comunidad de Madrid (Law 11/1986). Official State Gazette (in Spanish). 16 December 1986 [version as of 29 December 2006]. BOE-A-1987-4255.
- Ley 5/1990, de 17 de mayo, reguladora de la facultad de disolución de la Asamblea de Madrid por el Presidente de la Comunidad (Law 5/1990). Official State Gazette (in Spanish). 17 May 1990 [version as of 29 May 1990]. BOE-A-1987-4255.
- Decreto 15/2021, de 10 de marzo, de la Presidenta de la Comunidad de Madrid, de disolución de la Asamblea de Madrid y de convocatoria de elecciones (PDF) (Decree 15/2021). Official Gazette of the Community of Madrid (in Spanish). 10 March 2021. BOCM-20210311-1.
