= Inés Arrimadas =

Spanish politician (born 1981)

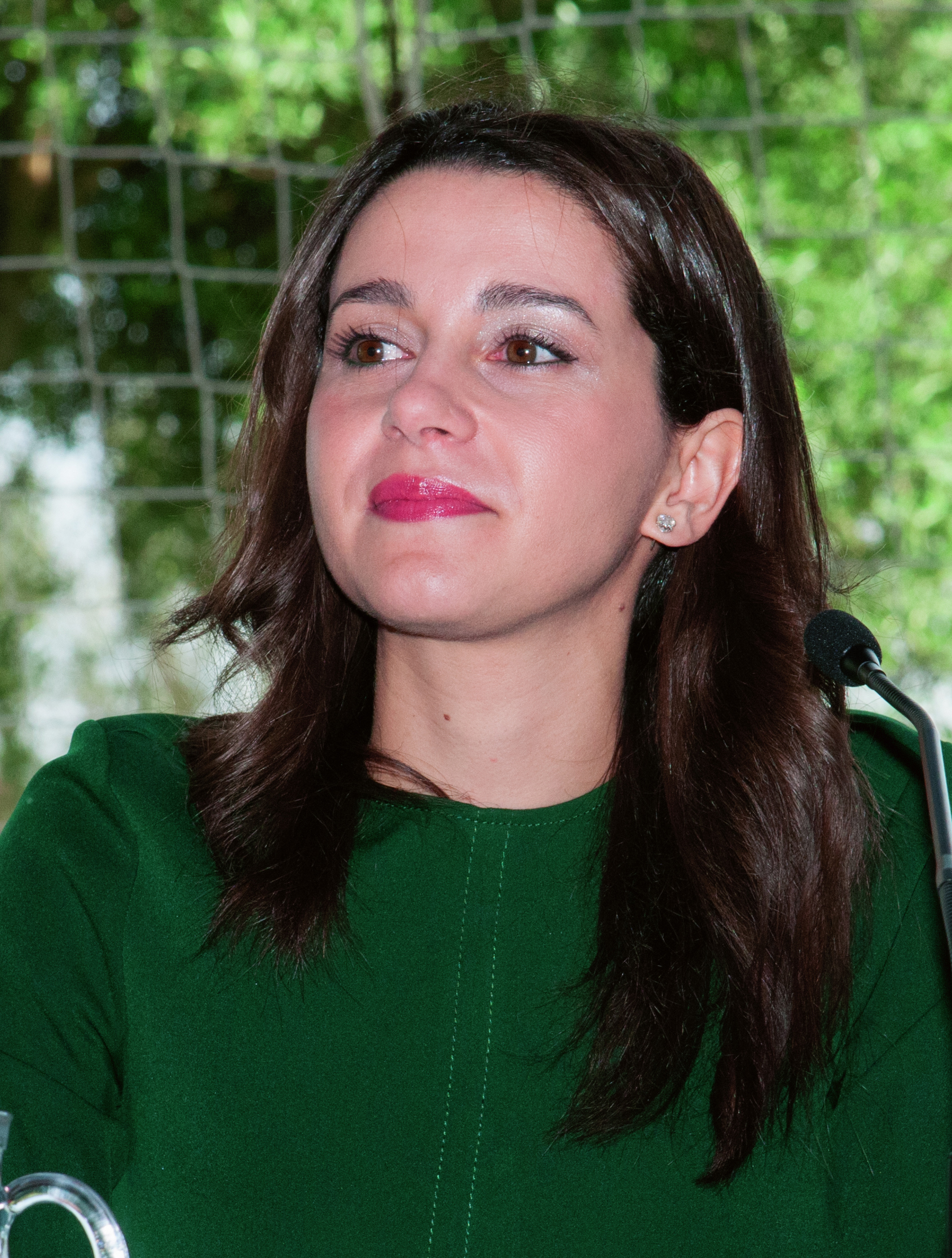
- Inés Arrimadas in May 2017

Leader of the Citizens Party
- In office 14 March 2020 – 15 January 2023
- Deputy: Marina Bravo Sobrino
- Preceded by: Albert Rivera
- Succeeded by: Patricia Guasp (as Spokesperson)

Spokesperson of the Citizens Group in the Congress of Deputies
- In office 21 May 2019 – 17 August 2023
- Preceded by: Juan Carlos Girauta

Leader of the Opposition in the Parliament of Catalonia
- In office 2 October 2015 – 20 May 2019
- Preceded by: Oriol Junqueras
- Succeeded by: Carlos Carrizosa

Member of the Congress of Deputies
- In office 21 May 2019 – 17 August 2023
- Constituency: Barcelona

Member of the Parliament of Catalonia
- In office 25 November 2012 – 20 May 2019
- Constituency: Barcelona

Personal details
- Born: 3 July 1981 (age 45) Jerez de la Frontera, Andalusia, Spain
- Party: Citizens (until 2023)
- Spouse: Xavier Cima (m. 2016; div. 2023)
- Children: 2
- Education: Pablo de Olavide University

Inés Arrimadas García (Spanish: [iˈnes ariˈmaðas]; born 3 July 1981) is a Spanish lawyer and former politician who served as Member of the Congress of Deputies and Spokesperson of Citizens party in the Congress. She was previously the leader of the regional branch of the party in Catalonia. In March 2020, she was voted party leader.

Arrimadas was born and raised in Jerez de la Frontera. Before entering in politics she worked as a consultant. She became a member of the party in 2011 and she first started being the spokesperson of the youth section. She became an MP of the Catalan parliament after the 2012 election. She was the Leader of the Opposition in the Catalan Parliament from 2015 to 2019.

== Early life and career ==
Arrimadas is the youngest of five children born to Rufino Arrimadas García and Inés García López, both of whom came from Salmoral in the Province of Salamanca. She moved to Barcelona in 2008.

Arrimadas studied at the Catholic school Nuestra Señora del Pilar in Jerez de la Frontera. She became interested in Catalonia as a result of being a fan of FC Barcelona which led her to take Catalan lessons from a Catalan classmate while she was in 7th and 8th grade, during which she learnt the club anthem. When she moved to Barcelona, the company she worked for, Daleph, paid her formal Catalan language classes to obtain the C1 level. Arrimadas is fluent in Spanish, Catalan, English, and French.

At age 18, Arrimadas began studying law at Pablo de Olavide University. She also undertook postgraduate studies in international business at IPAG Business School in Nice organised through the Erasmus programme.

At 24, Arrimadas worked for a year and a half in the petrochemical industry. For six years, she worked as a consultant at D'Aleph in Barcelona, having moved to the city in 2008.

== Politics ==
=== Parliament of Catalonia ===
In 2010, Arrimadas' coworker invited her to a Citizens public event at Romea theatre, and she accepted the invitation. Afterwards, she started to attend meetings of the political party. In one of those meetings, Albert Rivera went to teach oratory lessons and thought that she had potential. In 2011, Rivera asked her to go to the Youth Commission of the Parliament of Catalonia. Rivera also offered her to enter in the party's executive office.

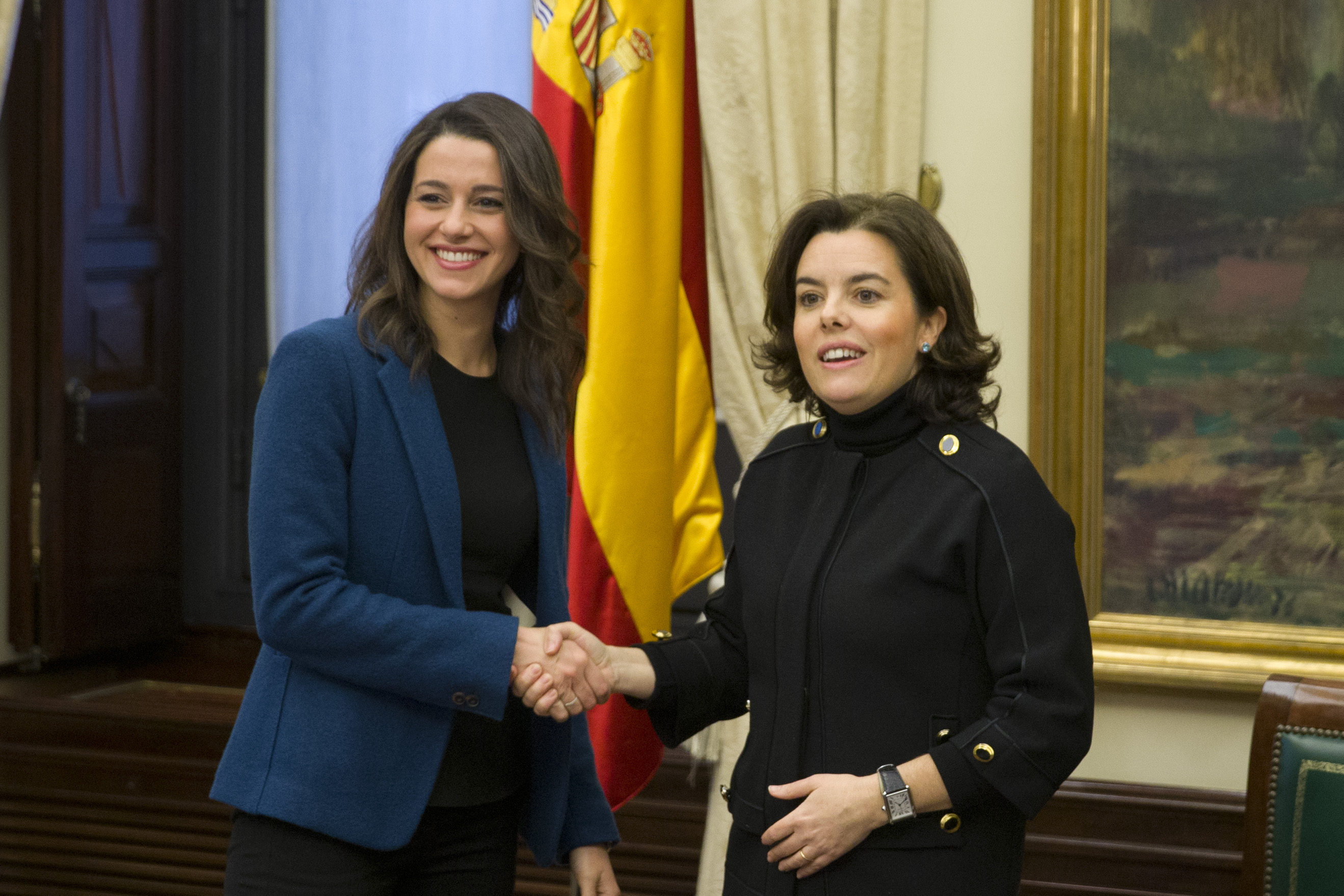
Arrimadas and deputy prime minister Soraya Sáenz de Santamaría in February 2017

Arrimadas was elected as a member of the Parliament of Catalonia in the 2012 Catalan regional election. She became the spokeswoman of Citizens in Catalonia in 2015, substituting Jordi Cañas, who resigned due to being indicted for alleged tax fraud. That same year, she was selected leader of the party for the Catalan elections which were held on 27 September. Citizens in Catalonia gained 17.9% of the votes, increasing their representation from 9 to 25 seats, obtaining the greatest anti-independence single party representation and became the party Leader of the Opposition of the Catalan parliament. In September 2017, Arrimadas reported to police a Catalan female who threatened her with gang rape for opposing independence; the woman received a four-month suspended jail sentence.

The party under Arrimadas secured the most seats in the 2017 election under a single party, but the pro-independence parties retained a narrow majority of seats in the Parliament of Catalonia. During the campaign for the elections of Catalonia in 2017, a hoax was popularized alleging Arrimadas' father was a Francoist secret agent. The cousin of his father was the one in a relevant position as a Francoist governor.

In 2018, she denied that the Catalonia president Lluís Companys was executed by the Spanish state, stating that Companys was executed by a Francoist, fascist regime, not by the Spanish state.

=== Congress of Deputies ===
In 2019, Prime Minister Pedro Sánchez dissolved the Cortes Generales in response to a budget defeat. In response to the snap election, Arrimadas announced she would run for a seat in the Cortes Generales with senator Lorena Roldán as party spokesperson in the Catalan Parliament and Carlos Carrizosa as leader. In the April 2019 election, Citizens list obtained 12.0% of the vote and 4 seats out of 32, one of which went to Arrimadas. In the November 2019 election, the party's vote share fell to 6.0% and 2 seats, but Arrimadas nevertheless managed to retain hers and remained a member of the Chamber of Deputies.

On 8 March 2020, Arrimadas was voted leader of Citizens, obtaining 76.9% of the vote in a three-way race.

== Personal life ==
On 30 July 2016, Arrimadas married Xavier Cima, a former Catalan MP and municipal councillor in Ripoll for the pro-independence Democratic Convergence of Catalonia, at an estate in Jerez de la Frontera. Cima then left politics to work for Kreab in Madrid. Their son Álex was born in May 2020. In a September 2021 post on Instagram, Arrimadas announced that she was pregnant with her second child. Their second son Marc was born in March 2022.

Arrimadas divorced Cima in 2023, and is currently in a relationship with Guillermo Díaz Gómez, a former Citizens deputy.
