= Adrián Vázquez Lázara =

Spanish politician (born 1982)

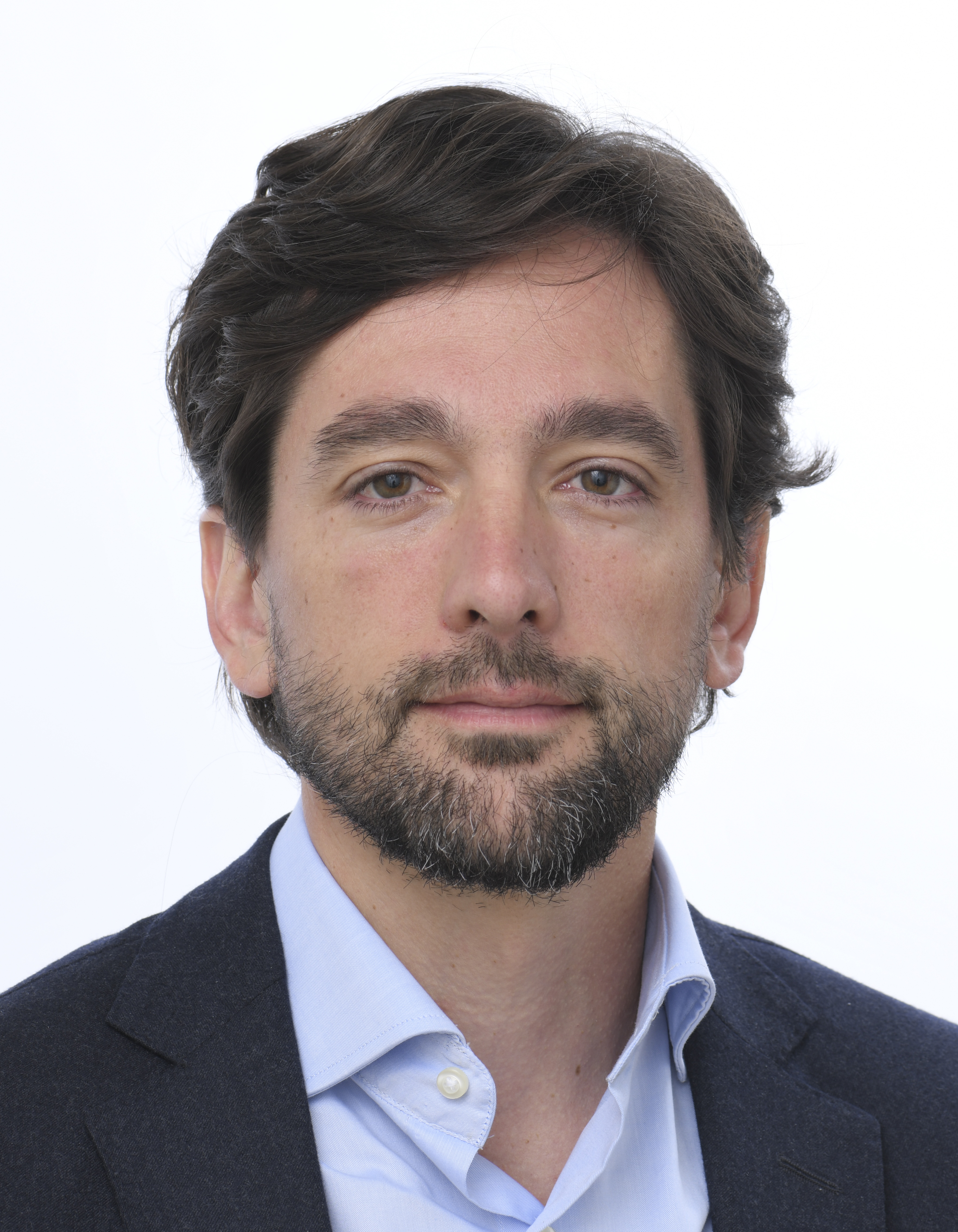

Member of the European Parliament for Spain
- Incumbent
- Assumed office 1 February 2020

Secretary-General of Citizens
- In office 15 January 2023 – 22 March 2024
- Preceded by: Marina Bravo Sobrino
- Succeeded by: Carlos Pérez-Nievas

Personal details
- Born: 5 May 1982 (age 44) Madrid, Spain
- Party: PP (2024–present)
- Other political affiliations: Citizens (2015–2024)
- Occupation: International relations • Politician

Adrián Vázquez Lázara (pronounced [aˈðɾjam ˈbaθkeθ ˈlaθaɾa]; born 5 May 1982) is a Spanish politician, MEP elected first for Ciudadanos in 2019 and re-elected in 2024 after agreed to join as an independent on the Partido Popular's list for the European elections following Feijoo's offer and the political disappearance of Cs.

== Early life and education ==
Born on May 5, 1982, in Madrid, his family roots are in the Galician town of Lalín in northwest Spain (province of Pontevedra). After starting Law studies at the Complutense University of Madrid, Vázquez spent a year in Japan, where he earned a diploma in Japanese Language and Culture Studies from the International Studies Institute in Tokyo. He also has an MA in International Relations from the University of Warwick (United Kingdom) and a Degree in International Relations from Lindenwood University (Missouri, United States), thanks to a sports scholarship.

== Professional career ==
Since 2015, Vázquez has coordinated Citizens’ international and European activity, as well as the international agenda of the Ciudadanos’ former president, Albert Rivera. Also, together with Luis Garicano, he steered the negotiations that led to the party joining the European liberal family of ALDE (Alliance of Liberals and Democrats for Europe) and, subsequently, to the formation of the Renew Europe group in the European Parliament, a coalition made of all the European liberal parties with the French centrist party La République En Marche!, founded by Emmanuel Macron. He also coordinated Citizens’ 2019 European Parliament elections campaign

A specialist in international affairs and public administration, between 2015 and 2020, before being elected to his present position, he was chief of staff of the Citizens delegation to the European Parliament. The now MEP had already gained first-hand experience of this institution a year earlier, when he was head of office of the then MEP for UPyD (Union, Progress and Democracy) and Vice President of ALDE, Fernando Maura.

Previously, he worked for various organizations such as the OSCE, specifically for the Secretariat in Vienna and the Mission to Bosnia and Herzegovina; NATO, as a researcher for the Political Committee and the Science and Technology Committee; and the Korea Trade-Investment Promotion Agency. He has also worked as an advisor to former minister for foreign affairs, Ana Palacio, and as a Public Affairs consultant.

== Political career ==
In 2019 he was designated no. 8 on the list of Citizens candidates for the European Parliament elections on 26 May. As a result of the distribution of seats following the United Kingdom’s exit from the European Union, Vázquez took up his seat as an MEP on 1 February 2020.

On 17 February 2020 he was elected Chair of the European Parliament’s Committee on Legal Affairs. He is also a member of the European Parliament’s Conference of Committee Chairs and the Delegation for Relations with the People’s Republic of China, and a substitute member of the Committee of Agriculture and Rural Development and the Delegation for Relations with Bosnia and Herzegovina, and Kosovo

In September 2022 he was designated spokesperson for Ciudadanos at the European Parliament, replacing Luis Garicano. He is also in charge of the executive coordination for the re-foundation of Ciudadanos and of building a stronger relationship with liberal parties around the EU.

In 2024, as Secretary General of Ciudadanos, he defended before his party colleagues that, given the political situation Spain was facing, the best option for the liberal formation was to form an electoral coalition with the Partido Popular for the 2024 Catalan and European elections. After garnering the support of many of his party colleagues and obtaining the approval of the PP leadership, the coalition was blocked by the leaders of the Ciudadanos party in Catalonia.

Following the coalition's failure, and consistent with his ideal of not dividing the center and right-wing vote against Pedro Sánchez, Adrián resigned from all his positions in Ciudadanos. At that same moment, the leader of the Partido Popular, Alberto Nuñez Feijoo, opened the doors of his party to Adrián Vázquez and other former liberal officials to run on the popular formation's lists in the European elections.

Adrián Vázquez ran as number 10 on the PP list in those elections and was re-elected as a Member of the European Parliament in June 2024.
