= Carlos Carrizosa Torres =

Spanish politician and lawyer (born 1964)

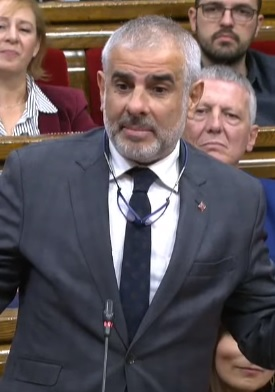

Leader of the Opposition in the Parliament of Catalonia
- In office 20 May 2019 – 21 May 2021
- Preceded by: Inés Arrimadas
- Succeeded by: Salvador Illa

Member of the Parliament of Catalonia
- In office 25 November 2012 – 9 June 2024
- Constituency: Barcelona

Personal details
- Born: 22 March 1964 (age 62) Barcelona, Spain
- Party: Citizens (since 2006)
- Education: University of Barcelona
- Occupation: Lawyer

Carlos Carrizosa Torres (born 22 March 1964) is a Spanish politician and lawyer, being a member of the Parliament of Catalonia where he is the spokesperson of Citizens. He studied Law at the University of Barcelona and is a member of the Lawyer Association of Barcelona. He is a lawyer in exercise.

He became a member of the Steering Committee of the party in 2011, having been a member previously, between 2007 and 2009. He was elected member of the Catalan Regional Parliament in the 2012 Catalan Parliament election and re-elected in the 2017 election and the 2021 Catalan regional election. In the 2024 election, his party suffered a devastating defeat losing all seats.
