= Santiago Saura Martínez de Toda =

Spanish engineer and politician

Santiago Saura
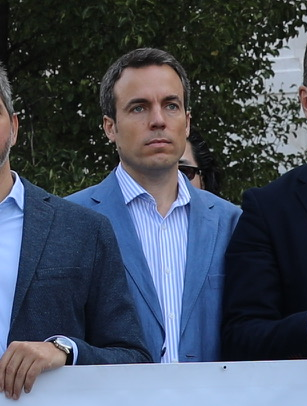

Madrid municipal councillor
- Incumbent
- Assumed office 15 June 2019

Personal details
- Born: 1974 (age 51–52) Oviedo, Spain
- Party: Citizens (since 2006)
- Education: Technical University of Madrid
- Occupation: Engineer, professor, politician

Santiago Saura Martínez de Toda (born 1974) is a Spanish engineer, professor and politician. Member of the Madrid City Council since 2019, he serves as councillor-president of the district of Retiro.

== Biography ==
Born in Oviedo in 1974. He earned a PhD from the Technical University of Madrid (UPM), reading a dissertation titled Influencia de la escala en la configuración del paisaje: mediante un nuevo método de simulación espacial, imágenes de satélite y cartografías temáticas in 2001, supervised by Francisco Javier Martínez Millán. He became a member of Citizens–Party of the Citizenry (Cs) in 2006, while he was working as lecturer at the University of Lleida. He obtained a chair as full professor in Forestry Engineering at the UPM. He worked for three years for the European Commission in the scope of environmental sustainability and protected natural areas. Based in Northern Italy working for the European Commission, he returned to Spain to run in the Cs list vis-à-vis the May 2019 Madrid municipal election. Included in the 2nd slot of the party list led by Begoña Villacís, he was elected as member of the Madrid City Council.

Following the investiture of José Luis Martínez-Almeida with the 'yes' votes of People's Party, Cs and Vox on 15 June 2019, Saura was appointed as Councillor-President of the districts of Retiro and Hortaleza. He was soon dismissed from the latter position, as he was in turn charged with the delegated portfolio for Internationalisation and Cooperation (a post attached to the Vice-Mayorship).

Political offices
Preceded by Yolanda Rodríguez	Councillor-President of the Hortaleza District; June 2019 – July 2019	Succeeded by
Preceded by Nacho Murgui	Councillor-President of the Retiro District; Since June 2019	Succeeded by
