= Albert Rivera =

Spanish politician (born 1979)

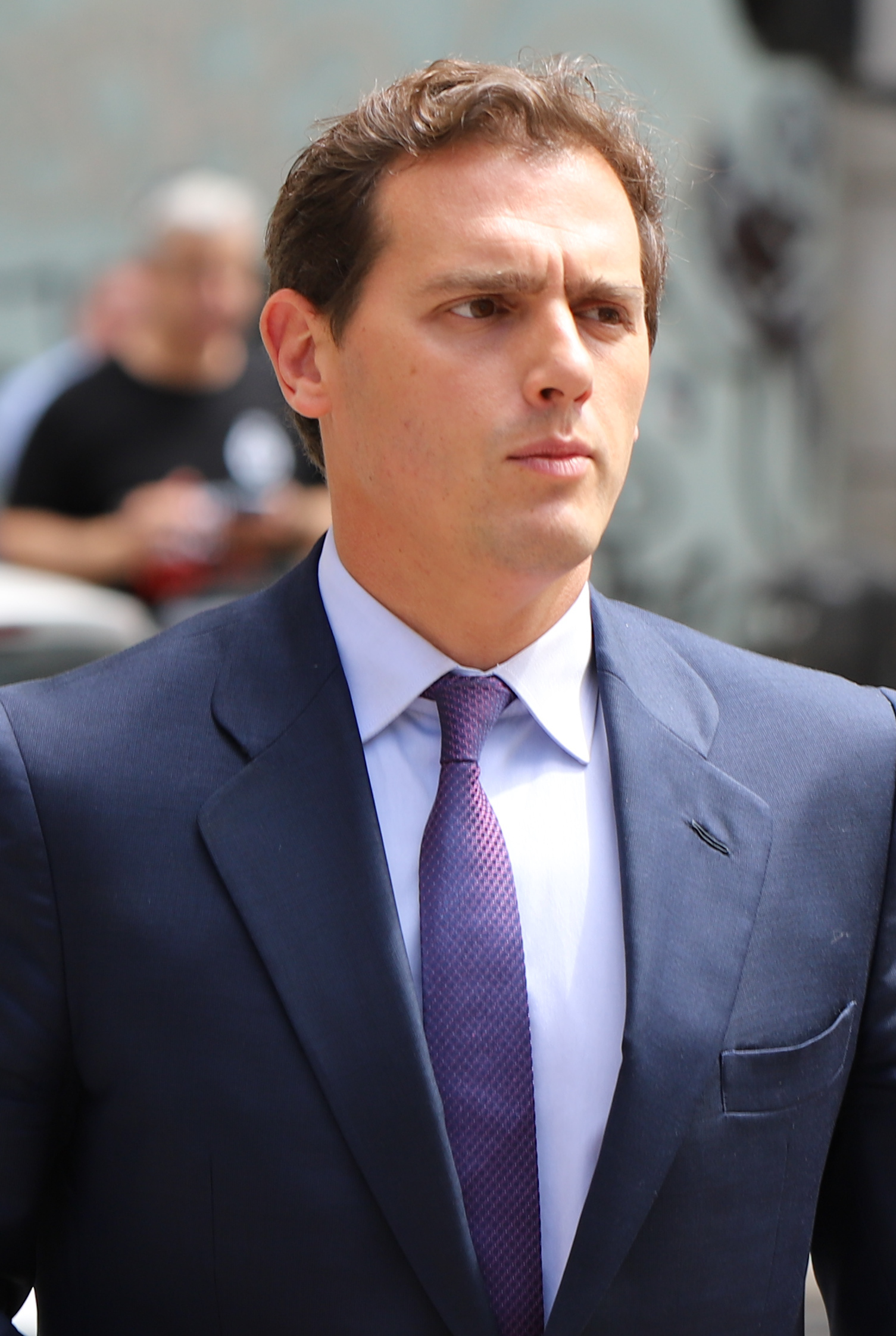
- Albert Rivera in 2019

Leader of the Citizens Party
- In office 9 July 2006 – 11 November 2019
- Preceded by: Position established
- Succeeded by: Inés Arrimadas

Member of the Congress of Deputies
- In office 7 January 2016 – 2 December 2019
- Constituency: Madrid

Member of the Catalan Parliament
- In office 1 November 2006 – 4 August 2015
- Constituency: Barcelona

Personal details
- Born: Alberto Carlos Rivera Díaz; 15 November 1979 (age 46) Barcelona, Catalonia, Spain
- Party: Citizens (2006–2019); People's Party (2003–2005)
- Education: ESADE Business School (LL.M); University of Helsinki; Autonomous University of Barcelona; George Washington University
- Profession: Lawyer; academic; politician; diplomat

Alberto Carlos Rivera Díaz (born 15 November 1979), known as Albert Rivera, is a Spanish former politician who was the leader of Citizens from its founding in 2006 until 2019. He was a member of the Parliament of Catalonia (2006–2015) and the Congress of Deputies (2015–2019).

== Early life and education ==
Alberto Carlos Rivera Díaz (Note: Name under which Rivera was reportedly registered after birth. The name resurfaced as Rivera was included in the tentative list for the April 2019 Spanish general election as Alberto Carlos Rivera Díaz.) was born in Barcelona. Albert Rivera Díaz is the only child of Agustín Rivera, member of a working-class family from La Barceloneta, and María Jesús Díaz, who had moved aged 13 from the small town of Cútar in Málaga province to follow in the footsteps of her elder brother, who had opened an electrical appliances shop.

As a child, Albert spent several summers in Cútar. Over the years, most of his maternal family also moved to Catalonia, except for his grandfather Lucas Díaz, who had been the first to emigrate in the 1960s to France and then to Switzerland.

Eventually his parents' opened their own business and moved to live in L'Ametlla del Vallès, where they sent their son to the private la Escola Cervetó school.

He won the Catalan swimming championships at the age of 16 and played for the Granollers water polo team.

He went on to study law at ESADE, part of the Ramon Llull University, completing the degree in 2001. He completed a master's degree in constitutional law from the same institution in 2002. He also studied for one year at the University of Helsinki in Finland, as part of an Erasmus scholarship. He has also taken a course at the George Washington University in political marketing.

== Professional career ==
Once he completed his university studies, Rivera began working as a legal counsel at the La Caixa savings bank in 2003. He stopped working for La Caixa in 2006 when he became the president of Citizens.

== Political career ==
Rivera was elected as the president of Citizens during their founding conference in July 2006. He was re-elected as president again in 2007 and 2011.

Rivera was first elected to the Parliament of Catalonia in the 2006 regional election, and remained a member until he stepped down before the 2015 parliamentary election. Launching the Citizen's campaign for the Parliament of Catalonia in 2006, Rivera published a number of leaflets where he posed naked alongside the caption: "We don't care where you were born. We don't care which language you speak. We don't care what kind of clothes you wear. We care about you". Rivera, and the wider Citizens party, are opposed to Catalan independence.

In 2017, he was invited to the annual meeting of the Bilderberg Group, which took place on 1 June in Chantilly, Virginia.

On 11 November 2019, after the large electoral setback suffered by Citizens on the snap general election the day before, losing over 80% of its seats in the Congress and one-third of its seats in the Senate, Rivera resigned from his position as president of the party and left politics entirely to focus on his personal life.

== Later career ==
After leaving politics, Rivera went back to the private sector. From March 2020 until February 2022, he worked in the law firm Martínez-Echevarría, where he would eventually become an associate. His ousting from the firm two years later was surrounded by controversy, with his former associates complaining of his "low productivity" and "poor performance", and describing his incorporation as an "authentic fiasco".

== Political positions ==
After abandoning his early stance on the loosening of the "prisión permanente revisable" (permanent revisable prison), Rivera has hardened his positions in terms of the fulfillment of criminal sentences with some of his proposed measures in the matter being described as a case of "punitive populism". In October 2019, Rivera declared he wanted to become prime minister to jail those who dare to try to break up Spain.

== Personal life ==
Rivera and the singer Malú have a daughter, born in June 2020. In July 2023 it was confirmed they were separated.
