= Valencian Coalition =

Valencian Coalition Coalicio Valenciana Coalición Valenciana
- Leader: Juan García Sentandreu
- Founded: 2004
- Dissolved: 2011
- Merger of: Blasquist Autonomist Party; Regional Party of the Valencian Community; Valencianist Renovation
- Headquarters: Gran Vía Marqués del Turia, 51 1º-1ª (València)
- Newspaper: El Palleter
- Youth wing: Political Youth of Valencian Coalition (JPCV)
- Ideology: Blaverism; Anti-Catalanism; Opposition to immigration Spanish unionism
- Political position: Far-right

Website
- coaliciovalenciana.es (Archived)

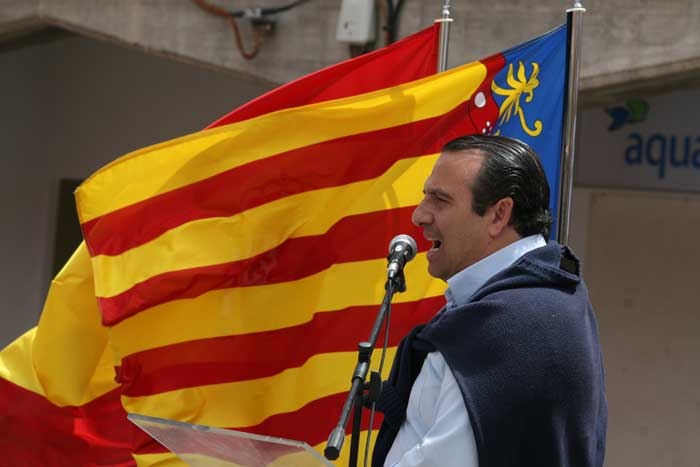
Juan Garcia Sentandreu in an act of the party in Alboraya.

Valencian Coalition (Valencian: Coalicio Valenciana, CV) was a far-right blaverist political organization active in the Valencian Community between 2004 and 2011. CV was linked to more extreme factions of anti-Catalan valencianism, like the Grup d'Acció Valencianista (GAV).

== Ideology ==
The party, and its related group the GAV, were as considered far-right, fascist and neo-nazi organizations by other political parties, academia and social and cultural groups.

CV main objectives were opposing what they considered pancatalanism and attacks on Valencian identity. This included defending the Valencian language as separate from the Catalan one. CV also opposed foreign immigration to the Valencian Community.

== History ==
CV was founded as a coalition of various small parties, led by the historic GAV and Falangist Juan García Sentandreu. The parties that joined the coalition were the Blasquist Autonomist Party (PBA, that considered itself a continuation of the blasquist political movement of the early 20th century), Regional Party of the Valencian Community (split of Valencian Union), Valencianist Renovation (another split of Valencian Union), Blasquist Republican Party (PRB, that also considered itself a continuation of blasquism). CV also had agreements with other parties in various municipalities, including the national-catholic Spanish Democratic Party, the Valencian Independent Group or the Valencian Independent Organization. In 2005 Identity Kingdom of Valencia joined the coalition, but left in 2007.

In 2005 a member of the Corts Valencianes, Francisco Javier Tomás Puchol, left the People's Party and joined CV, giving the coalition representation the regional parliament. The party leader expected to gain 8 representatives and 250 municipal councillors in the autonomic and local elections of 2007, but the coalition failed to enter the Valencian Parliament and only gained 20 local representatives and 1 mayor (Beniflá). The results of those elections were particularly weak in the big cities.

In 2010 CV had an internal leadership crisis, after Santandreu decided to leave because of personal fatigue and that the coalition needed a younger person to give another image and a "new style". However, the coalition was not able to find a new leader and the expected renovation did not happen.

The party run for the autonomic and local elections of 2011 very weakened due to the previous crisis and bad electoral results. The main points of the autonomic campaign were:

- Solving the problems of insecurity and crime.
- Fighting Illegal immigration.
- Opposing the "advance" of catalanism.
- Opposing political corruption and squandering.
- Improvement of public services.

CV gained 10,691 votes in the election, failing the enter the Corts Valencianes again. Sentandreu recognized the absolute defeat. The coalition was dissolved on May 26, 2011.

== Controversies ==
- The president of the youth-wing of the party, Víctor Saiz Castelló, was denounced by United Left of the Valencian Country in December 2008 after graffiti signed by CV appeared in the headquarters of the party in Mislata. The graffiti included: "Attention Panca: Blue zone" and "You will not make us catalans". Saínz had trouble with the justice again in 2012, after Compromís denounced him for attacking their headquarters in València, causing material damage. Although he was recorded by a security camera while he was carrying out the attack, he did not show up for trial.
- The annual "Informe Raxen" of the Movement Against Intolerance accused CV of acts of far-right terrorism and violence. The same movement also qualified CV as an anti-democratic and fascist organization.
- Juan García Sentandreu acknowledged in 1999, while he was the leader of the GAV, during a trial he had attacked with eggs a Catalan autonomous television car during an illegal demonstration against the Valencian Council of Culture, in which members of this official institution were also physically attacked.
- On March 24, 2006, Juan García Sentandreu, accompanied by dozens of members and supporters of CV, as well as members of the GAV and the GAV Youth, assaulted the Faculty of Law of the University of Valencia with the intention of holding a conference for which the university had previously denied permission. Security personnel had to intervene to prevent the dean from being attacked.
- In June 2008, Sentandreu was detained by the National Police accused of violence towards the party's number two, Elena Múñoz Carpi.
- In 2011 CV organized a public act in which the coalition urged to hit José Luis Rodríguez Zapatero in "the eyebrow".
- On July 5, 2011, several members of Spain 2000 and CV boycotted the presentation of the book 'Noves glòries a Espanya', by the sociologist and former leader of the Valencian Nationalist Bloc Vicent Flor. Among the people who tried to sabotage the act were both the leader of Spain 2000, José Luís Roberto, and the president of CV, Juan García Sentandreu. Protesters threw chairs to those attending the event.
