= Manuel Broseta =

Spanish academic and politician (1932 - 1992)

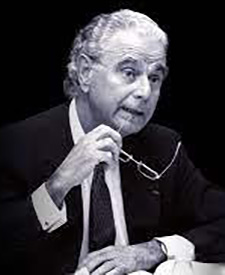

Member of the Senate for the Province of Valencia
- In office 1 March 1979 – 31 August 1982

State Secretary for Autonomous Communities
- In office 19 June 1980 – 1982

Personal details
- Born: 13 October 1932 Banyeres de Mariola, Spain
- Died: 15 January 1992 (aged 59) Valencia, Spain
- Cause of death: Assassination by gunshot
- Party: Union of the Democratic Centre
- Education: Complutense University of Madrid

Manuel Broseta Pont (13 October 1932 – 15 January 1992) was a Spanish academic and politician. He was a member of the Senate of Spain between 1979 and 1982 and he served as State Secretary for Autonomous Communities for the Union of the Democratic Centre (UCD) between 1980 and 1982. He was also a member of the Spanish Council of State. Broseta was assassinated by ETA members on 15 February 1992.

== Early life ==
Manuel Broseta Pont was born in Banyeres de Mariola in the Province of Alicante. He however moved to the city of Valencia at an early age and went to school there. His father, a member of the Republican Left was temporarily arrested when Spanish leader Francisco Franco visited Valencia. The incident had a lasting impact on Broseta, which made him value freedom and respect for others throughout the rest of his life. In 1955 he obtained his licentiate in Law from the Universidad Literaria de Valencia. He furthered his academic studies at the Complutense University of Madrid, starting in 1956 and graduating in 1959. He was an assistant and later adjunct professor at the same university until 1964, when he became professor of business law at the University of Valencia. He contributed to the creation of the Faculty of Economic Sciences at the university. He was dean of the Law faculty between 1970 and 1972. During this time he was prosecuted in the Tribunal de Orden Público for writing an article, he was however absolved of the charge. He resigned as dean in 1972 after the Spanish Ministry of Education and Science intended to purge the Spanish academic life of three hundred professors and over a thousand students for political reasons, as they rose academically against Francoist Spain. In 1973 he was the first signatory of a list requesting a university Chair of Valencian Culture and Language at the University of Valencia.

== Political career ==
After the 1977 Spanish general election Broseta became an advisor to the President of the Consell of the Valencian Region. Even though Broseta had been politically active he had not joined a party before 1979. He was however seen as close to the Socialist Party of the Valencian Country, and by their support became vice-president of the mixed commission for power transference to the pre-autonomic Valencian Community. Broseta however did not join the Socialist Party, instead becoming member of the Union of the Democratic Centre (UCD) in January 1979. He was a member of the Senate of Spain for the Province of Valencia between 1 March 1979 and 31 August 1982. In the Senate he served as president of the Commission of Education and Culture for almost two years between 1979 and 1981. At different times he also served in the Commission for Internal Affairs and Justice and the Commission for the Constitution. He also served on the special commission for University teaching problems and the investigatory commission for public order and terrorist acts. In June 1980 Broseta was offered the position of State Secretary for Autonomous Communities. Initially unsure whether to accept, he held the position until 1982.

Within the Valencian UCD he allied himself with Fernando Abril Martorell, who served in the Congress of Deputies and José Luis Manglano de Mas, who served as a member of the municipal council of Valencia. Together the three men supported the Valencian political cause. After the disintegration of the UCD in 1983 Broseta left politics. In September 1982 he had already made plans to leave the UCD as he felt it was no longer his party. He left at the same time as Manglano.

As a politician Broseta was a supporter of anti-Catalanism and as a Valencian of Blaverism. He rejected the idea that the Valencian Community belonged to the Països Catalans and he was a critic of Catalan leader Jordi Pujol.

== Later life ==
After his time in politics Broseta returned to Valencia and focused on his academic life once more. He was awarded a Cross of Honour of the Order of St. Raymond of Peñafort in 1985. In 1987 he was made Elected member of the Spanish Council of State. On 26 March 1990 he was made Chevalier (Knight) in the French Legion of Honour.

In 1991 Broseta refused an offer to lead the party list of the Partido Popular (PP) in the municipal elections of Valencia. PP Senator José Miguel Ortí Bordás said that Broseta had also been approached to become the PP candidate for the elections of President of the Generalitat Valenciana in 1995.

== Death ==
On 15 January 1992 at 10:20 Broseta had just finished a class at the Faculty of Law of the University of Valencia and entered the gardens on Avenida de Blasco Ibañez. He was on his way to the Banco de Valencia, where he worked as an advisor, to attend a meeting. He was then approached by a man and woman who ordered a student walking behind Broseta to get down on the ground. Broseta was killed by a single shot to the neck fired from a handgun. The two attackers fled the scene in a Volkswagen Polo which they abandoned at the intersection of Avenida de Aragón and Calle de Amadeo de Saboya, only 500 meters away from the site of the murder. Police attempted a controlled explosion of the car, fearing boobytraps. The car however exploded before they could do so, resulting in one police officer receiving minor injuries. Eyewitnesses reported that the attackers fled in another car and took the highway towards Barcelona. The separatist group ETA claimed the attack.

=== Aftermath ===
The municipality of Valencia as well as the Generalitat Valenciana called for a minute of silence at 10:30 on the day after the incident. The Senate of Spain had earlier held a minute of silence. The municipality of Valencia later erected a column in Broseta's honor.

The Profesor Manuel Broseta Foundation was founded on 16 July 1992, wishing to honor Broseta's memory. The foundation awards a Coexistence Prize every year.

ETA commander José Luis Urrusolo Sistiaga, who was convicted to 449 years in prison for 16 murders, including that of Broseta, was temporarily released in 2013. The release was criticized by Pablo Broseta, son of Manuel. José Luis Álvarez Santacristina was sentenced to thirty years' imprisonment for the murder of Broseta. A couple of ETA members suspected of the crime were arrested in Puerto Vallarta, Mexico in February 2014, after being fugitives for 22 years. The prosecutor sought a prison sentence of 56 years against the couple. In March 2015 the Spanish Audienca Nacional found them not guilty.

In May 2022, Facultats, the Metrovalencia station closest to the university where he had worked was renamed Facultats-Manuela Broseta in his memory.

== Works ==
- Manual de derecho mercantil (1983)
