= Racó Català =

Racó Català (Catalan corner) is a website that uses only the Catalan language. It is produced by Tirabol Produccions, and it began to work on 4 March 1999 It was founded by Joan Camp, Oriol Morell and Guillem Sureda, who were then students. The main ideology trend of this website is Catalan independentism and it has no association or link with any political party. It deals with cultural, social or general matters from around the Catalan Countries. It has also been responsible of many on line campaigns to defend the Catalan language. At the beginning of 2013 it had more than 20.000 registered users, and in its interactive Internet forum near 5 million messages had been published along its history. In February 2013 it was placed in the sixth position among the digital newspapers in Catalan language that had an OJD measurement. with more than 330.000 monthly unique visitors. In September 2015 it received 418.747 unique visitors according to the OJD.

After ETA's attacks in Burgos and Majorca during the summer of 2009, Racó Català endured a discredit and slander campaign from some Spanish far-right media and internet forums, that linked Racó's Catalan independentism with terrorism apology.

Racó Català's organization has received subsidies from the Department of Communication Media of the Generalitat de Catalunya. It is a member of the digital area of the Catalan Association of Free Newspapers. Digital journalist Saül Gordillo published in Racó Català the main articles of his blog in an area called 'Bloc sense fulls' (Block without sheets) from 23 May 2006 until June 2009. In 2007 it was awarded by the Jaume I Prize from the Cultural Institution of the Franja de Ponent, and in April 2013 it was awarded by the Joan Coromines Prize by the Coordinated Associations for the Catalan language.
