= Catalanic Community =

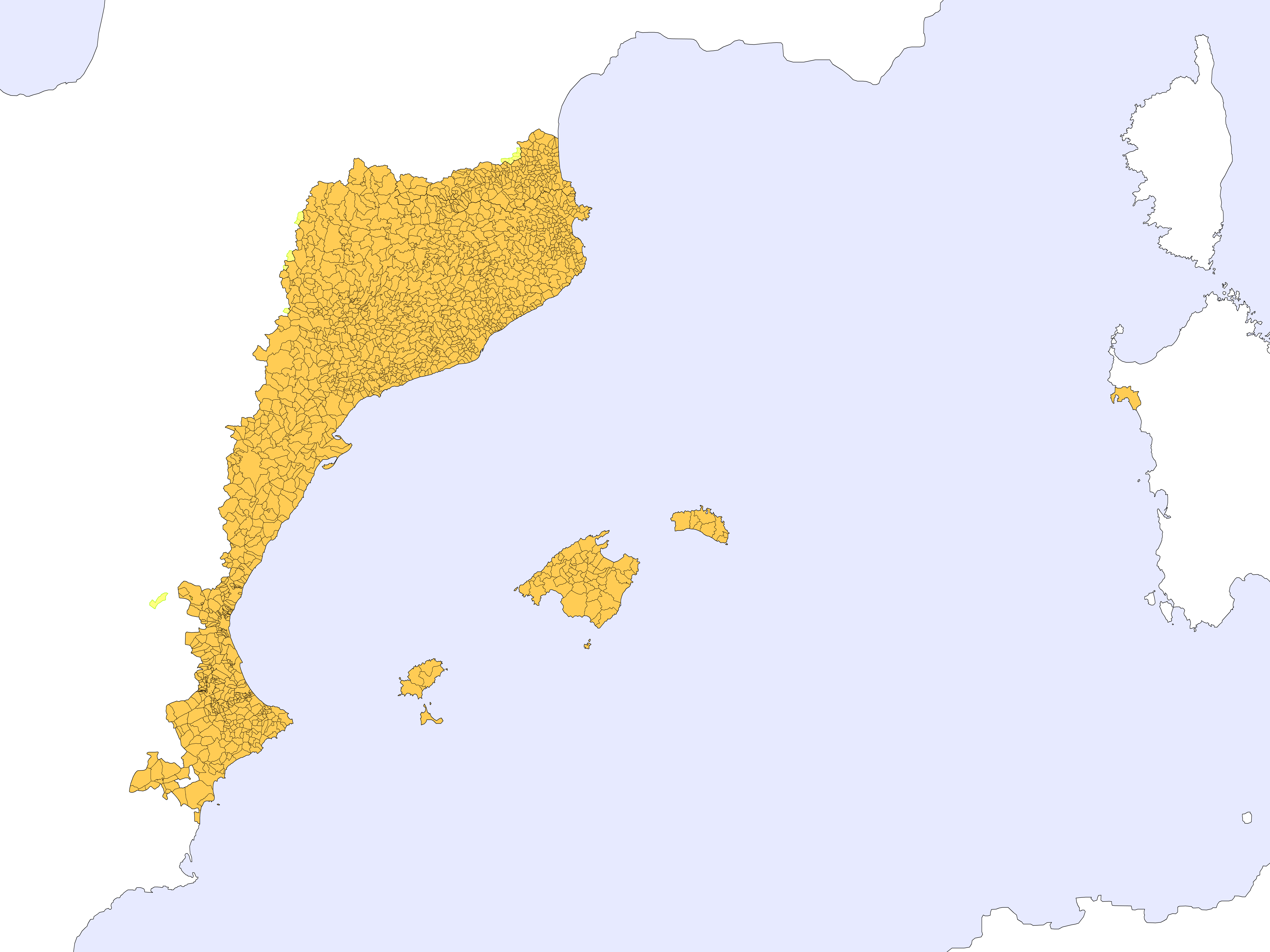
Un mapa dels Països Catalans on sols apareixien els municipis catalanoparlants va ser una de les causes que expliquen l'aparició de la carta-manifest.

The term Catalanic Community, and the demonym Catalanic, were proposed by Miquel Adlert and other Valencianists as alternative concepts to the Països Catalans (Catalan Countries) and the Catalan nation, as a sole nation, with the intention to define a name that is accepted by all the territories of the Catalan-speaking community. Thus it was expressed his need in a manifest at Serra d'Or. June 1961, no. 6, signed, among others, by Alfons Verdeguer, Xavier Casp, Miquel Adlert, Jaume Bru i Vidal, Alfons Cucó, Rafael Villar and Beatriu Civera:

per al dit conjunt de València, Mallorca i Catalunya acceptem la denominació suggerida fa poc per Miquel Adlert Noguerol de "Comunitat Catalànica", on la primera paraula indica el tipus d'unió que existia i és el que acceptem, i la segona afirma la unitat de llengua i cultura, alhora que ens dóna un gentilici comú i nou per a tots, que conservem així els antics, junt amb les denominacions de sempre per a les nostres terres".

== Bibliography ==
- Fuster, Joan (1976). Un País sense política: [Reflexións valencianes] (in Catalan). La Magrana. ISBN 84-7410-002-X. OCLC 431805518.
