= Catalanic =

Catalanic (Catalan: catalànic) may refer to:

- The Catalanic Community, also known as the Països Catalans (Catalan Countries)
- Judaeo-Catalan
