= Destino (magazine) =

Defunct Spanish magazine

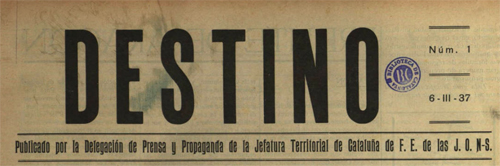
- 1st number of Destino Magazine, Biblioteca de Catalunya
- Frequency: Weekly
- First issue: March 6, 1937
- Final issue: May 16, 1980
- Country: Spain
- Based in: Burgos; Barcelona
- Language: Spanish
- ISSN: 2604-0611

Destino (Spanish for 'destiny') was a Spanish weekly magazine published in Spain between 1937 and 1980, initially in Burgos and from 1939 in Barcelona.

Destino is considered one of the most valuable Catalan publications in Spanish. It connected with broad sectors of the population, and became indispensable to know the evolution of the culture and customs of Catalonia.

== History ==
Destino magazine was founded in Burgos in May 1937 by Xavier de Salas Bosch and Josep Maria Fontana i Tarrats, a group of Catalans linked to the Spanish Falange. It served as organ of expression for Catalan francoists intellectuals refugees in the area during the Spanish Civil War. The title of the weekly refers to the phrase of José Antonio Primo de Rivera: "Spain is a unit of destiny in the universal" ("España es una unidad de destino en lo universal"); until 1945 it carried the subtitle "Unity policy" ("política de unidad"), in reference to the Spanish national unity.

In 1939, Josep Vergés i Matas and Ignasi Agustí, with the support of Juan Ramon Masoliver, resumed the publication of the journal from Barcelona as a private publication, disassociated legally from the Falange, but not ideologically. In the beginning of 1940, the writer Josep Pla joined the magazine. In this second epoch, under the subtitle of «FET y de las JONS weekly» (Semanario de FET y de las JONS), it was one of the most prominent propaganda magazines of Franco's regime, from a filonazi falangism, an enemy of Catalanism, democracy, liberalism, communism, etc. However, it was assaulted by a rival Falangist group during World War II. The assault has often been attributed to a supposed aliadophilia of the journal, a fact today is debunked as a myth of much later elaboration.

Josep Vergés was also the publisher of Destino Editions. Both, the magazine and publishing company were strategic tools to replace the Catalan culture network by a Spaniard culture who express themselves in Spanish.

Around 1942, the magazine progressively left the Germanophile tone and falange symbolism and broadened its culture topics.

In 1957, after lengthy personal and political clashes, Vergés bought the Ignasi Agustí shares of the company, becoming the sole owner of the magazine. This, consolidated the turn of the editorial stance to a monarchism in support of Don Juan, heir to the defunct Spanish throne.

Under the direction of Néstor Luján (1958-1969), Destino was as distant from the Franco regime as possible, and gradually became, within the possibilities of the moment, a liberal, timidly catalanist and advocate of a certain democracy (in the framework of a new restoration of the Bourbon monarchy). The magazine eluded the difficulties posed by the censorship of the Franco regime while retaining a high cultural tone and formal quality, which had a great influence on the Catalan bourgeoisie. It was prosecuted and closed by order of the Government Minister Fraga Iribarne on 1967.

In 1975, Jordi Pujol (future president of Catalonia) bought the magazine to Vergés and ask Baltasar Porcel to direct it (1975-1977), who was followed by Josep Pernau (1977). Some authors suggest that Pujol used the weekly to promote his political and personal agenda. Following a period of decadence, Pujol sold the magazine in 1978.

The magazine closed in 1980. In 1985 it was tried to revive it, but after five issues it stopped publishing.

== Contributors ==
Among the directors of the Barcelona epoch were Ignasi Agustí, Néstor Luján and Xavier Montsalvatge, but Josep Vergés exerted much influence as he owned them.

Although Josep Pla was one of his main contributors, as he published for thirty-six years in a row, regular contributors, among others were Celestí Martí Farreras, Valentí Castanys, Manuel Brunet, Joan Estelrich, Juan Ramon Masoliver, Josep Palau i Fabre, Sebastià Gasch, Miquel Porter i Moix, Jaume Vicens Vives, Azorín, Néstor Luján, Santiago Nadal, Sempronio, Josep Maria de Sagarra, Gaspar Sabater, Enrique Badosa, Camilo José Cela, Carles Soldevila, Miguel Delibes, Joan Fuster, Francesc Candel, Ana María Matute, Dorothy Molloy, Joan Perucho, Álvaro Cunqueiro, Baltasar Porcel, Manuel Jiménez de Parga, Juan Goytisolo, Josep Melià, Pere Gimferrer, Carmen Alcalde, Pedro J. Ramírez, Josep Maria Espinàs, Francisco Umbral, Manuel Benet Novella, Frederic Roda Pérez and Delfí Abella. Among the illustrators stand out Junceda, Ramón Capmany, Antoni Vila Arrufat. They are considered the main writers and intellectuals of the so-called "third Spain" (tercera España), a possibilist group formed by not exiled but neither francoists.

== Legacy ==
In 2010 the Biblioteca de Catalunya launch the complete digitalization of the three Destino epochs, from 1937 to 1985, within the ARCA (Arxiu de Revistes Catalanes Antigues) portal. Josep Vergés's papers are also deposited in the Biblioteca de Catalunya.

== Bibliography ==
- Cabellos, Pilar; Pérez Vallverdú, Eulàlia (2007). Destino: Política de Unidad (1937-1946): tres aspectes de l'inici d'una transformació obligada (in Catalan). Barcelona: Fundació Carles Pi i Sunyer. ISBN 978-84-95417-70-1.
- Geli, Carles; Huertas, J. Ma. (1990). Les tres vides de Destino (in Catalan). Barcelona: Diputació de Barcelona: Col·legi de Periodistes de Catalunya, DL.(Vaixell de paper; 7). ISBN 84-4046310-3.
- Vergés, Josep C. (2008). Un país tan desgraciat, memòria compartida amb l'editor de Destino (in Catalan). Barcelona: SD Edicions. ISBN 978-8493592103.
- Bardavío, Joaquín; Sinova, Justino (2000). Todo Franco. Franquismo y antifranquismo de la A a la Z. (in Spanish). Barcelona: Plaza & Janés. ISBN 9788401377198.
- Trapiello, Andrés (2019). Las armas y las letras. Literatura y Guerra Civil (1936-1939) (in Spanish). Planeta. ISBN 978-8423355532.
- La crónica de Destino. Antología del semanario publicado entre 1937 y 1980 (2 volúmenes) (in Spanish). Barcelona: Ediciones Destino. 2003. ISBN 9788423335626.
