= Noguerol =

Noguerol is a surname. Notable people with the surname include:

- Francisco Noguerol (born 1976), Spanish footballer and manager
- Miquel Adlert i Noguerol (1911–1989), Spanish novelist and publisher
