= Bernard Weiss =

Bernard Weiss may refer to:

- Bernard G. Weiss (1933–2018), professor emeritus of languages and literature at University of Utah
- Bernard Weish or Bernard Weiss, a fictional linguist
