= Grup d'Acció Valencianista =

Members of the GAV, along with militants of España 2000 in the celebration of the Valencian Community day in 2012

The Grup d'Acció Valencianista (GAV) (Group of Valencianist Action) is a blaverist organization which was created in 1977. They define themselves as "the fighting and warlike faction of real valencianism". Nonetheless, they are generally considered as an extreme right group due to their activities.

Along their history, they have used repeatedly violence, especially their youth wing. Because of their frequent use of both verbal and physical violence, some reports regard GAV as a far-right terrorist group.

Some of their threatening actions against education centers, and individuals, associations and democratic parties have been made with false names, such as Maulets 1707 or Colectiu Vinatea (sic).

== Historical background ==
The main Valencianism after the Spanish Civil War (the "new Valencianism", according to Joan Fuster) generally had a progressive ideology. Its main feature was a breaking-off from Francoist ideology and also against the tendencies of traditional Valencianism before the Spanish Civil War. The blaverism was born as a reaction against that. and the GAV was allegedly created in order to unify the regionalist people that defended Spain as their nation. They also tried to embody "traditional Valencianism".

The ideas of new valencianism were considered by the GAV as the "essence and symbol of the imperialist pancatalanism that aimed at the annexation of the Kingdom of Valencia into the illegal Catalan Countries". With this kind of justification, during the Spanish transition, the GAV tried to create a controversial atmosphere in order to stop the process of the approval of the Valencian Country Statute of Autonomy. According to the critics of blaverism, the GAV had been infiltrated by important men and women from the Francoist right. Some people consider it a terrorist group. In fact, the UCD representative, Emilio Attard, introduced members from the GAV into the ranks of his own party.

During the festivities of 9 October (the Valencian regional day) in 1979, a group of people linked to the GAV burned the Flag of the pre-autonomous Council of the Valencian Country, that was waving from the balcony of Valencia City Hall, with a fuse that was created by Rafael Orellano, who was then a UCD city councillor, and who had been previously president of GAV. At the same time, some members of the Pre-Autonomous Council of the Valencian Country were assaulted. From then on, the GAV began to play an important role inside blaverism, and it claimed responsibility for violent actions, in order to try to justify their ideals.

Nowadays, they have a very reduced and limited presence. Nonetheless, they continue their acts of extortion and persecution.

== Violent actions ==
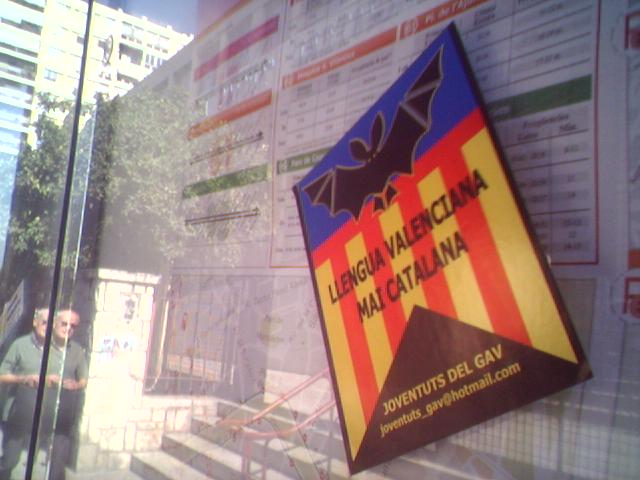
Sticker of the Youths of the GAV against the unity of the Catalan language

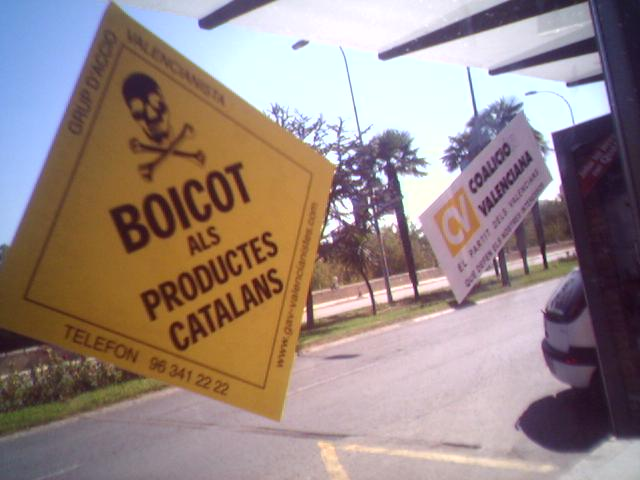
Sticker of the Youths of the GAV giving support to the boycott of Catalan products

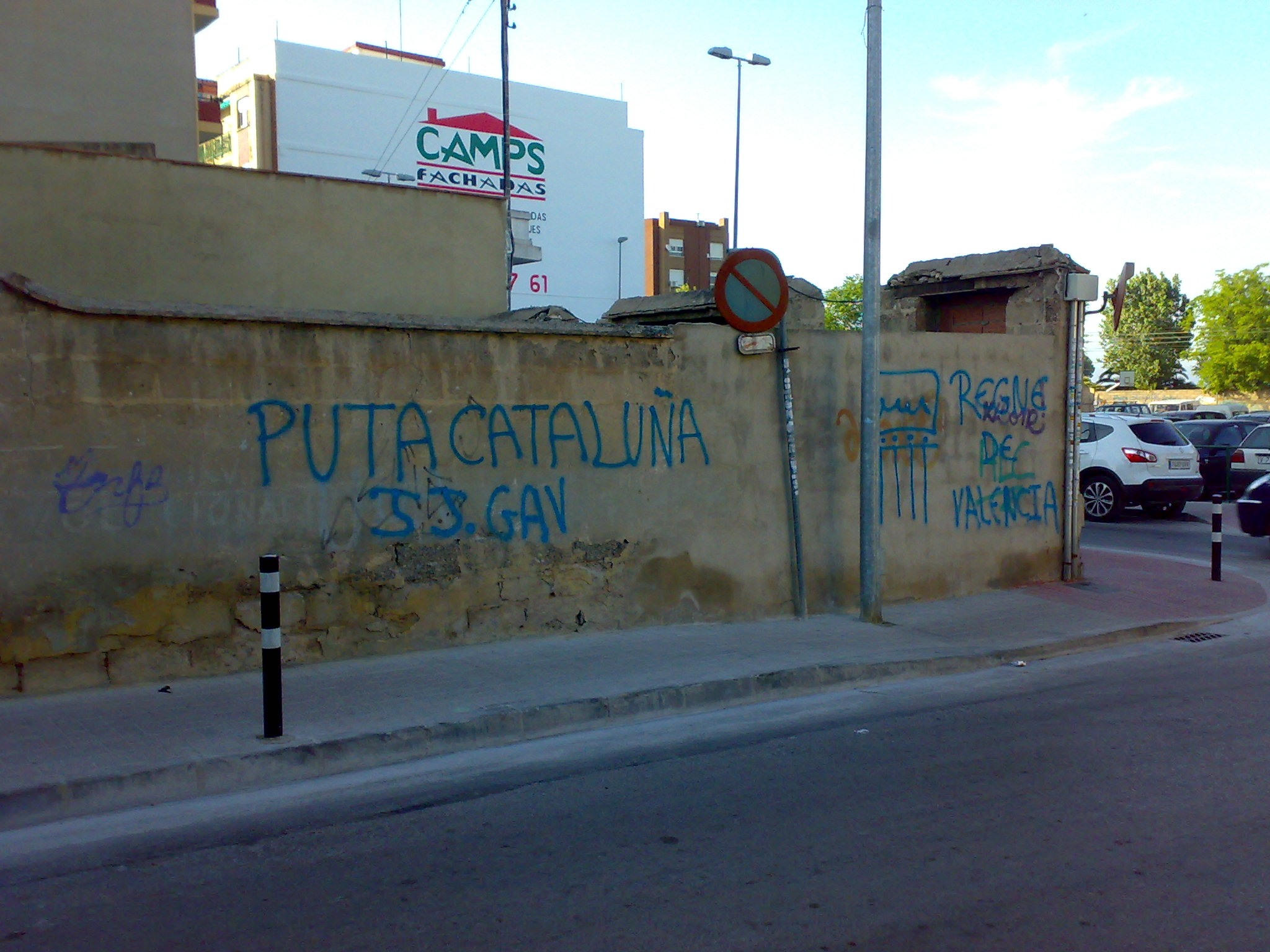
Graffiti of the Youths of the GAV in Burjassot, Valencian Country (2010)

Two terrorist attacks against Manuel Sanchis i Guarner's and Joan Fuster's lives (in 1979 and 1981 respectively) with extremely powerful explosives were made by people that in some respect were linked with the GAV. Nobody claimed responsibility for these actions. Nobody was prosecuted either. Nonetheless, according to the legal process, they were vandalistic actions. The fact that GAV has never claimed responsibility for these facts, but they have claimed responsibility for one terrorist attack against Sanchis-Guarner in 1978 as a "reaction of the Valencian people against the Catalanist aggression" and as a "not bloody action" show the ideological proximity between the aggressors and this organisation.

Two months after these "vandalistic" acts, Sanchis-Guarner died of a heart attack. On the other hand, Joan Fuster acknowledged in a TV interview in 1992 that he had decided to abandon active social life because that terrorist attack had caused him to be depressed. Nonetheless, the GAV does not define itself as a fighting or terrorist group.

In their magazine, SOM, the GAV justified the terrorist attack against Sanchis-Guarner in October 2002, just after the crime was prescribed, and therefore it was not possible to condemn the guilty ones.

Among their most famous violent acts, was the boycott of a David Rosenthal speech inside the Llotja de València because of his Tirant lo Blanc's translation into English, in January 1985. Some GAV supporters (among them Carles Recio, a so-called modern Valencian intellectual), delivered mice through the Llotja in order to disrupt the speech.

Juan García Sentandreu acknowledged in front of a Spanish judge that he had attacked a Catalan television car with eggs after an illegal demonstration against the Consell Valencià de Cultura (a consultative Valencian culture organisation). During this illegal demonstration, the members of this official institution were also attacked.

On 1 December 2007, GAV members delivered pamphlets around La Garrigosa high school, in Meliana. These pamphlets contained photos and personal details of some of the teachers of this high school, such as their personal addresses. They were accused of being "Catalanists". In these pamphlets, the neighbours were encouraged to "stand up against them". These actions are thus similar to making political "black lists".

In January 2008, some GAV members wrote threatening and xenophobic graffiti on the walls of the cultural association Ca Revolta and the Centre Social-Bar Terra. These places had a strong link with Valencia's progressive and nationalist environment.

In the same month. the Casal Jaume I from Acció Cultural del País Valencià (a nationalist cultural Valencian organization) in Catarroja, was attacked by unknown people with a bomb of hydrochloric acid while a meeting of the civic platform Salvem Catarroja (Let's save Catarroja) was held inside it. The victims had declared that they suspected GAV involvement. Some days before, members of this civic platform received death threats by phone, and the barrack huts that they used in order to store their materials had been attacked while they were making a demonstration against the speculation. Several objects were stolen, and other ones were broken or painted. The authors had signed in the barrack huts with the acronym "JJGAV".

In February 2008, the Valencian Nationalist Bloc headquarters were attacked by a group of people who put graffiti on the door and broke the lock. The BLOC linked these people with GAV.

In November 2010 GAV sent a letter to UNESCO, in which they opposed castells becoming part of the World Heritage according to their standards. They argued that children that took part in that were in danger. They also had the aim of showing that in Valencia "there could be interferences of Catalan culture". The report was rejected.

=== Legal sentences and arrests ===
During the campaign for the 1996 Spanish general election, three supporters of the Valencian nacionalist party Unitat del Poble Valencià (UPV) were menaced and injured by members of GAV. The current president of this organisation, Manolo Latorre, was condemned by these facts.

Similarly, during the civic procession of 9 October 1997, Juan García Sentandreu, who was then president of GAV, pushed, threatened to kill and insulted Pere Palés, who was a nationalist and progressive member of the youths of the blaverist party Unió Valenciana. Sentandreu was ordered to pay two fines of 70,000 pesetas.

On 29 December 2003 some members of GAV assaulted people and broke into the Casal Jaume I (nationalist center) in the Russafa district of Valencia, which was made by Alejandro Esteve Caballero, José Luis Conejero Asunción and Amalia Lidia Bonheme. The three members of the GAV were condemned to prison because of these facts. The legal condemn stated a crime of theft with force and a fault (a crime of lesser category in Spanish Law) of damages, with the aggravating circumstance of ideological discrimination but with the mitigating factor of damages repair.

Alejandro Esteve was, when the assault took place, the president of the youths of the GAV. After this sentence, the youths of the GAV were expelled from the Valencian Youth Council and Esteve was disqualified from holding positions in the boards of associations. At the same time, the GAV expelled Alejandro Esteve. After that, he founded the Plataforma Jovenil Valencianista (Valencianist Youth Platform).

On 14 December 2007 some members of the JJGAV assaulted the Casal Jaume I in Sueca, with the aim of avoiding the presentation of Eric Bertran's book "Èric i l' exèrcit del fènix" (Eric and the army of the phoenix), and they assaulted several people. Four members of the JJGAV were arrested by the municipal police.

In January 2008, three ERC deputies at the Spanish Congress of Deputies were withheld inside the building of Valencia where they were launching a book. Around fifty extreme right people were responsible, and they were throwing glass bottles against the façade of the building, while they were insulting and menacing. 24 people, linked with the GAV, were sentenced to pay a fine of 3.000€ each one.

On 26 September 2008, a group of extreme-right activists, who were gathered by the Gandia section of the GAV, they made an illegal demonstration when the fire of the Correllengua came to Gandia. When it happened, Maité Peiró, town councilor of the Valentian Nacionalist Bloc in L'Alqueria de la Comtessa was hit by a stone on her head. It caused her an injury that needed 12 stitches. 18 people from the ones that caused the riot were identified, and were fined with 301 euros for "illegal demonstration" and for "insulting and rebuking the police and the public", although Maite Peiró's attacker could not be identified.

In December 2008, and after several reports by the Movement against Intolerance, the Valentian Nacionalist Bloc or the Youth Council of Valencia, the festivities councillorship of the City Hall of Valencia announced more control in order to avoid the distribution of political pamphlets in Expojove (fair for the children that takes place in Christmas), but it did not ban the GAV, as it was requested, since they said that "they had not seen any judicial sentence against the youths of the GAV". Finally, the GAV was banned from this fair for children in 2010.

On 5 July 2011, some members of the GAV and España 2000 boycotted the launch of Vicent Flor's book Noves Glòries a Espanya (New glories for Spain), that took place in the FNAC of Valencia. After that, the GAV's ex-president Juan García Sentandreu was arrested and taken by the police to jail.

As a consequence of these facts, the Parliament of Catalonia condemned the "repeated attacks of the extreme right" in the Valencian Country. Previously, Coalició Compromís had already proposed a similar motion in the Corts Valencianes, but it had been rejected by the People's Party.

== Publications and performances ==
The GAV is one of the institutions that consider that Valencian is different from the Catalan language. So they signed in 1981 the Normes del Puig (which state a different orthography for the Valencian variety of the Catalan language). It is a member and also founder of the Coordinadora d'Entitats Culturals del Regne de València (Coordinator of Cultural Institutions of the Kingdom of Valencia).

The GAV has published several books and magazines according to their own orthographical rules. They have published books for children such as "Nelo i Carmeta", "Avant", "Pobles i gents", and also propaganda books such as "La Llengua Valenciana en perill", "Valencians front al catalanisme". Moreover, it created el "Colectiu de Mestres de la Secció de Pedagogia" (sic) (Group of teachers of the Pedagogy Section), which made dictionaries Valencian-Spanish/Spanish-Valencian according to the normes del Puig.

The GAV has also created a prize, called "Premi Llealtat"(sic) (Loyalty Prize), which they give to the people that have kept their spirit of defense of the Kingdom of Valencia". Among the people that have received this prize, there are the following ones: Ricart Garcia Moya, Miguel Ramón Izquierdo, Lleopolt Penyarroja and Josep Mª Guinot.

Furthermore, they publish a magazine called SOM, which appears irregularly. This magazine publishes opinion articles of authors that share the group ideology, they criticize the Valencian government, the corruption of the mass-media and the "attacks" from Catalanism against the Valencian people. This magazine made apology for the terrorist attack against Sanchis Guarner, acts of street violence or the aggression of the Valencia mayor Pérez-Casado on 9 October 1980, among others.

== Youths ==
These days, the GAV looks for new supporters through the JJGAV (Youths of the GAV). This organization is quite often linked with other groups, such as España 2000 (extreme right Spanish political party, with its headquarters in Valencia). Some GAV activists are even E2000 activists at the same time.

The Youth's program is almost exclusively based on anticatalanist actions, such as the boycotts against Catalan products, demonstrations, protest acts, and so on.

The GAV's Youths lawyer is Vicente Boluda Crespo.

== Presidents ==
- Rafael Orellano (1976–1977)
- Pasqual Martín Villalba (1977–1984)
- Chimo Romero (1984–1989)
- Pere Aguilar (1989–1994)
- Juan García Sentandreu (1994–2001)
- Manolo Latorre Castillo (2001–...)
