= Jaume Vicens i Vives =

Catalan historian

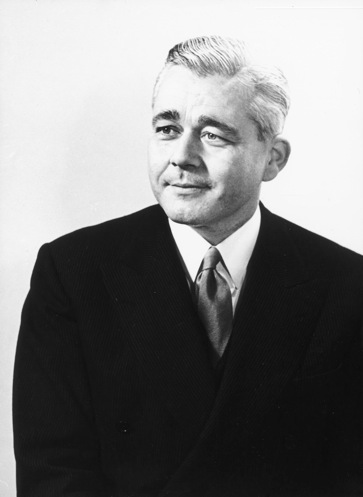
Jaume Vicens Vives

Jaume Vicens Vives (6 June 1910 in Girona, Catalonia, Spain – 28 June 1960 in Lyon, France) was a Catalan historian, considered one of the most influential Spanish historians of the 20th century.

== Biography ==
=== Childhood ===
He was the son of Juan Vicens Comas and Victoria Vives and was born on the Santa Eugènia road, number 5, in Girona. His father had arrived in Girona at the end of the 19th century and worked as a proxy in the factory La Farinera Ensesa. His mother had a dressmaker's shop in the Plaça del Gra. His parents had two sons and a daughter: Juan, born in 1906; Jaume, in 1910 and María del Carmen in 1923.

He completed his primary studies at the Salesian school of the Brothers of Christian Doctrine in Girona. From his childhood he already showed a clear scientific vocation, dedicating his best efforts to persevere in his studies.

His father died suddenly in 1922 and his mother moved to Barcelona in 1924, where she had more opportunities to support her family by working in her profession. In 1926 his mother remarried and the bad relations between Jaume and his stepfather led him to leave the family home when he was only 16 years old to live in a boarding house, paying for the completion of his secondary studies with a job as an accountant in a department store. His mother died in 1929.

According to Eliseo Climent Corberá, his 1954 book Notícia de Catalunya was a direct source and inspiration for Joan Fuster's influential 1962 book Nosaltres, els valencians. That book was to have been originally titled Nosaltres els catalans, but it was renamed under Josep Pla's advice, for fear of Francoist censorship. Fuster's work has the same structure and intention as Vicens' book does. The book was expanded and republished in 1960. Notícia de Catalunya had also a major influence on Jordi Pujol. Vicens was also a friend an influence for Juan Reglá.
