= José Albi =

Spanish poet, literary critic, and translator

- Pseudonym "Diez Claves"
- Born: José Albi; 1922; Valencia, Spain
- Died: 7 June 2010 (aged 87–88); Jávea, Spain
- Known for: Poet, literary critic, and translator
- Notable work: Vida de un hombre El silencio de Dios; Odisea 77; Elegía atlántica Bajo palabra de amor Elegías apasionadas Piedra viva
- Movement: Surrealistic introversion
- Awards: "premio Valencia de Literatura"; 1957, 1977, 2002 "premio Gabriel Miró"; 1958 "premio Miguel Ángel de Argumosa"; 1978

José Albi Fita (also known as Josep Albi Fita in Valencian) (1922 – 7 June 2010) was a Spanish poet, literary critic, and translator. He was the Honorary President of the Asociación Valenciana de Escritores y Críticos Literarios (CLAVE - Critics of Literary Writers Association of Valencia). Albi was the "last of the post-Spanish Civil War poets".

== Early life and education ==
In 1922, José Albi Fita was born in Valencia but grew up in Sueca. He studied law at the Universitat de València, where he met Joan Fuster, and the Universidad de Deusto. Albi received a degree in philosophy and letters from the Universidad de Zaragoza and earned a doctorate from the Universidad Complutense de Madrid. During his lifetime, Alibi remained in contact with Miguel Hernández, Dámaso Alonso and Gabriel Celaya.

== Career milestones ==
In the 1950s, inspired by a reading of Marinero en tierra by Rafael Alberti, Albi began to write poetry for the first time in earnest. He began publishing the Cuadernos literarios journal and his literary critique appeared in Verbo y Cuadernos literarios, a review which he founded in 1954. Albi began writing under the pseudonym, "Diez Claves" or "Ten Keys" while employing surrealistic introversion terms. He is also noted for his collaboration with Joan Fuster in anthologizing the work of Ángel Crespo, Paul Éluard, and the Spanish surrealists.

== Awards ==
As a poet Albi was popular both with critics and the general public, and received a number of awards. In 1957, he received his first significant honor from the Generalitat Valenciana, [there was not Generalitat Valenciana in 1957, this must be an error] the "premio Valencia de Literatura" (Valencia Literature Prize), for Vida de un hombre. In 1958, he won the "premio Gabriel Miró" (Gabriel Miró Award) for El silencio de Dios.

In 1977, Albi received a second "premio Valencia" for Odisea 77. In 1978, he was awarded the "premio Miguel Ángel de Argumosa" (Miguel Ángel de Argumosa Prize)for Elegía atlántica.

In 2002, Albi received his third "premio Valencia de Literatura". Moreover, he served as honorary president of the Asociación Valenciana de Escritores y Críticos Literarios (CLAVE - Critics of Literary Writers Association Valencia).

== Final years and death ==
Albi maintained interest in Oliva, Spain as that was his motherland and the Sea side resort of Xàbia.

Albi died at his home in Jávea on 7 June 2010.

== Bibliography ==
Following is a list of Albi's various works in order of their appearance:

- Vida de un hombre
- El silencio de Dios
- Odisea 77
- Elegía atlántica
- Poemas del amor de siempre
- Septiembre en Paris
- Bajo palabra de amor
- Elegías apasionadas
- Piedra viva
