= Miquel Adlert i Noguerol =

Valencian novelist and publisher

Miquel Adlert i Noguerol (1911 in Paterna, l'Horta de Valencia, Spain – 1989) was a Valencian novelist and publisher.

He was one of the main instigators of the literary renaissance in Valencia (Valencia area of Spain) during the 1940s. In 1943, he co-founded with Xavier Casp the publishing house l’Editorial Torre, which published the best-known Valencian writers of the post-war era.

In 1935, he was a member of the Valencian nationalist political party Accio Nacionalista Valenciana. After the Spanish Civil War, the party could nott be legalised, and all his efforts were focused into literature.

In 1953, his novel I la pau ("And the Peace") and his novella El salze à la sendera ("One on the Path"), both with characteristic features of the Catholic novel, were published. His short story collection Cor al nu was published in 1956.

When democracy was restored, he participated co-founding the magazine Murta, who was the most important media of the blaverist movement.

== Publications ==
- I la pau (1953)
- El salze a la sendera (1953)
- Cor al nu (1956)
- En defensa de la llengua valenciana (1977)
- De la meua catacumba (1984)
- El compromís de Casp, qüestió juridica (1984)
- Del periodisme meu (1984)
