= Nosaltres, els valencians =

Essay by Joan Fuster

Cover of a recent edition of Nosaltres els valencians.

Nosaltres, els valencians (Valencian: [noˈza(l)tɾes elz valensiˈans]; "We, the Valencians"), is a historical and political essay by the Valencian (Spain) author Joan Fuster, first published in 1962.

The book deals with Valencians, especially their national identity and their relationship with Spain, Catalonia and the Catalan-speaking community as a whole. It does so from an ardourous Catalanism.

The fact that it represented the first solid intellectual effort in the twentieth century to construct an overview of the past and the present of Valencians from a Catalanist point of view explains its relevance and controversy back in the day. It was because of the novelty of this new Catalanist paradigm, consisting of Catalanism made from Valencia, that the book caused a stir in the Valencian Francoist establishment and, with the advent of democracy in Spain, still remained deeply controversial for its uncompromising views.

Nosaltres, els valencians marked the dawn of Valencian nationalism in its modern formulation. It was also the main force behind a revival of the Països Catalans idea and, with it, of the blaverist reaction against it as well.

== Criticism ==
The book was criticized by some Valencian nationalists as well, who considered that Fuster took the Catalan nationalist model without adjusting it to the reality of what soon after (1982) became the present Valencian Community with the passing of the Valencian Statute of Autonomy.

== Influence ==
The book remained most influential in the Valencian Community during the 1980s. It began losing relevance by the early 1990s, as the Unitat del Poble Valencià, a party which had been partially inspired by it, started shifting their doctrine from Catalanism to Valencianism-proper, still within the Catalanist tenet, though. To date, Nosaltres els Valencians remains a fundamental cornerstone of the literature on Valencian identity, as much despised by some —who see in it a Catalanist fifth column in Valencia— as revered by others —who regard it as a yet to be surpassed reflection on the Valencian identity.

== Sources and influences ==
Fuster was influenced by Jaume Vicens i Vives's 1954 essay Notícia de Catalunya. Notícia de Catalunya was to initially be titled Nosaltres els catalans, but it was renamed under Josep Pla's advice, for fear of Francoist censorship. Fuster's work has the same structure and intention of Vicens'.

== See also ==
- Països Catalans
