= Blaverism =

Regionalist ideology in Valencia, Spain

Blaverism (Valencian: blaverisme, IPA: [blaveˈɾizme]) is a Valencian regionalist ideology and sometimes considered a Spanish nationalist movement too, in the Valencian Community (Spain) that emerged with the Spanish transition to democracy characterised by strong anti-Catalanism, born out of its opposition to Joan Fuster's book Nosaltres, els valencians (1962), which promoted the concept of the Catalan Countries which includes Valencia. They consider Fuster's ideas as an imperialist Catalan nationalist movement that tries to impose Catalan domination upon Valencia. Blaverism takes its name from the blue (Valencian: blava) fringe which distinguishes the Valencian flag from other flags with a common origin. People supporting this ideology are called blavers.

The term "blaverism" originally had a negative, often pejorative connotation, which is still kept among social groups who consider blaverism as a type of far-right movement. In the 21st century, the term blaver is recognised by different Valencian language dictionaries, including the official dictionary of the Acadèmia Valenciana de la Llengua. In its origins in the second half of the twentieth century, blaverism was a populist and heterogeneous movement, which grouped together regionalists and supporters of Valencian foral civil law. Support for blaverism has been strongest in the city of Valencia and in the areas immediately surrounding it.

== Development of blaverism ==
=== Reaction against Fuster ===
Blaverism is usually seen as a reaction against the ideas expressed by Joan Fuster in his 1962 essay Nosaltres els valencians ("We the Valencians"), which was very influential among Catalan nationalists during the 1960s and early 1970s. Fuster's thesis was that Valencians and Catalans formed part of a common nationality. In his words,

"No és que la bandera valenciana siga igual que la catalana. És la mateixa. Igual que amb la llengua i tantes altres coses."
"It isn't that the Valencian flag is identical to the Catalan. It is the same one. Same as with the language, and so many other things."

Blaverism not only rejects the thesis of a common nationality (flag, language, culture, etc.) but also promotes symbols of a distinct Valencian nationality; in this sense it can be described as a nationalist movement, although many of its early proponents were in fact post-Francoists. On 11 September 1981, two bombs exploded in Fuster's house, seriously damaging his library and archive. No one was prosecuted, but it was widely perceived to be a blaverist response to Fuster's political and cultural position.

=== Democratic transition ===
Some observers warned as early as in 1976 that the transition to democracy, and particularly the economic problems of the time, could radicalize the conservative positions of a part of the right. The first public backlash against the perceived pan-Catalanism of the left-wing parties occurred in the runup to the first democratic elections, in June 1977. There were a number of violent attacks on left-wing activists and bookshops from this time on.

In terms of democratic politics, the party which most closely espoused the blaverist cause was the centre-right Unión de Centro Democrático (UCD), which controlled the central government under Adolfo Suárez but trailed socialists in Valencia and Alicante. The first speech attacking pan-Catalanism came in December 1977 from Emilio Attard, its leader in the province of Valencia. Manuel Broseta, another leading member of the UCD, published an influential essay "Paella and the Catalan Countries" a few months later, the first in a substantial series of anti-Catalanist articles to appear in the newspaper Las Provincias. The UCD would defend, with some success, a staunchly Valencianist position throughout the negotiations leading up to the first Statute of Autonomy.

=== Valencian autonomy ===
The Consejo del País Valenciano was established by Royal Decree on 17 March 1978 and held its first meeting at the Monastery of El Puig on 10 April. All four main parties—the UCD, the postfrancoists of the Alianza Popular, the socialists of the PSOE and the communists (PCE)—were represented, and all signed a call for Valencian autonomy on 8 October, the eve of the Valencian national day. After the approval of the Spanish Constitution in December 1978, the Consell approved the first draft of a Statute of Autonomy at its meeting in Morella on 9 January 1979: this draft has become known as the "Statute of Morella".

The political climate degraded significantly after the elections of March and April 1979—with some hyperbole, the period has become known as the "Battle of Valencia". The elections gave the left another majority in the parliamentary deputation (PCE, 3; PSOE, 19; UCD, 19) but gave the UCD the majority of seats on the Consell del País Valencià (PCE, 1; PSOE, 7; UCD, 10), which were attributed under a different voting system. It was initially agreed that socialist Josep-Lluís Albinyana should rest as President of the Consell but the tensions between left and right were such that Albinyana was ousted after a vote of censure on 22 December 1979. The UCD accused Albinyana of using his position as President of the Consell to bounce through a Statute of Autonomy without consensus, while the socialists accused the UCD of wanting to reopen the consensus reached at Morella. There were elements of truth in both positions, and the close balance of electoral strength made the arguments particularly virulent.

As a result of the tensions in regional politics and of a certain number of developments at the national level, the Statute of Autonomy remained deadlocked throughout 1980, despite petitions in favour of Valencian autonomy from 529 of the 542 municipalities. The Valencian parliamentarians took the matter in hand after the failed military coup of 23 February 1981 (during which the city of Valencia suffered several hours of military occupation), producing a compromise draft Statute known as the "Statute of Benicàssim". It is this draft, along with a set of amendments proposed by the UCD and the communists, which was submitted for approval to the Cortes Generales in Madrid.

The Statute of Benicàssim was modified in favour of blaverist held positions by the Constitutional Committee of the Congress of Deputies, where the UCD held a majority. Nonetheless, Article 1 of the modified text, which named the autonomous community as the "Kingdom of Valencia", was rejected by the full Chamber (for, 151; against, 161; abstentions, 9) on 9 March 1982 and the text returned to the Constitutional Committee. A final compromise resulted in the name "Valencian Community"; the Statute of Autonomy entered into force on 1 July 1982.

== Blaverist positions ==
Blaverism's characteristic feature is its opposition to Catalan nationalism, whether real, perceived or, according to their opponents, simply made up. The positions associated with blaverism have varied somewhat since the return to democracy, depending on the direction of the supposed "threat". Some blaverist positions have become mainstream (e.g. the flag), some have lost their association with blaverism (e.g. role of the autonomous institutions) while some have become more associated with blaverism, and more hotly debated (e.g. the Valencian language).

=== Flag of the autonomous community ===
The flag of the Valencian Community, with the blue (blau) edge

The question of which flag should be used to represent the Valencian Community is at the origin of the name "blaverism", which is derived from the Valencian "blava", meaning "blue". The origin of the dispute can be traced to Fuster's "Nosaltres els valencians", where he claims that Valencians and Catalans have always shared the same flag (the Senyera) and that Valencian groups who had used different flags in the years before Franco "knew not what they did" (no sabien el que es feien, p. 26). The Senyera in its simplest form—sometimes referred to as the quatribarrada—gained a certain (but not overwhelming) support in Valencianist circles, and was on view at the march in favour of autonomy of 9 October 1977.

The Statute of Morella proposed that the flag of the autonomous community be the Senyera with the royal coat of arms at the centre (those of Peter III of Aragon (1336–87), who did much to formalize the autonomy of the Kingdom of Valencia within the Crown of Aragon). This was adopted as the flag of the Consell del País Valencià on 24 April 1979, but was seen as a provocation by the UCD, coming as it did after elections which would have given the centre-right a majority on the Consell but before the new Consell could be constituted.

Radical blaverist groups seized the opportunity provided by the tense political climate; the flags of the Valencia Town Hall were burnt by demonstrators on 9 October 1979, far from the only act of political violence that year.

The socialist representative left the Consell on 22 December 1979 and the choice of flag was reversed on 14 January 1980. The blaverists continued to insist that the flag of the new autonomous community be recognisably different from that of any other, and particularly that of Catalonia (the Senyera in its simplest form). The Statute of Benicàssim proposed a new design, but the UCD representative on the Constitutional Committee of the Congress of Deputies managed to impose an amendment making the flag of the autonomous community the same as that of the city of Valencia (for, 17; against, 16; abstention, 1) which includes the blue fringe (the Senyera Coronada).

Since the adoption of the first Statute of Autonomy, the issue has lost much of its controversy. The use of the Senyera coronada has a wide acceptance within the Valencian Community, although some small groups on the left of the political spectrum (e.g. Els Verds, ERPV) continue to refer to it as the "blavera" and the Senyera quatribarrada can be seen from time to time, particularly in the districts furthest from the capital.

=== Name of the autonomous community ===
The question of the name of the autonomous community was initially seen as fairly minor compared to the debates over the flag and the powers which would be granted to the Generalitat Valenciana. However it became the issue which almost caused the rejection of the Statute of Autonomy by the Congress of Deputies in 1982.

During the beginning of the transition from a dictatorship to a democracy, the term "Valencian Country" or "Land of Valencia" (Valencian: País Valencià; Spanish: País Valenciano) seemed to enjoy a wide consensus. It was under this name that the Consell del País Valencià was established, and it was this name which was used in the Call for Autonomy of 8 October 1978, signed by members of both the UCD and the AP.

The Blaverist view, minority even among the right at first, was that the term País Valencià implied an identification with the Països Catalans, something unthinkable for the Blaverists. In the context of the political tensions of 1979–80, they called ever more loudly for the alternative name Kingdom of Valencia (Valencian: Regne de València), name that was eventually settled as Valencian Community.

== See also ==
- Bernard Weish
- Norms of El Puig
- Grup d'Acció Valencianista
- Valencian Coalition
- Valencian Nationalist Left
- Valencian Regional Union
- Valencian Union
- Balearic People's Union
- Language secessionism

== Bibliography ==
- Bodoque Arribas, Anselm (2000). Partits i Conformació d'Elits Polítiques Autònomiques: Transició política i partits polítics al País Valencià (PDF). Working Paper núm. 183. Barcelona: Institut de Ciències Polítiques i Socials. Archived (PDF) from the original on 18 February 2012.
- Calpe i Climent, Àngel (1996). La Guerra Insidiosa. Lo Rat Penat. ISBN 9788489069053.
- Català Oltra, Lluís (2012). Fonaments de la identitat territorial amb especial atenció a la identitat nacional. El cas valencià: discursos polítics sobre la identitat valenciana entre els militants de base del Bloc, EUPV i PSPV-PSOE (PhD). Alacant: Universitat d'Alacant.
- Flor i Moreno, Vicent (2009). L'anticatalanisme al País Valencià: Identitat i reproducció social del discurs del blaverisme. València: Universitat de València.
- Flor i Moreno, Vicent (2011). Noves glòries a Espanya. Anticatalanisme i identitat valenciana (1a ed.). Catarroja: editorial Afers. ISBN 978-84-92542-47-5.
- Ruiz Monrabal, Vicente (2003). "El largo camino hacia la Autonomía Valenciana." Revista Valenciana d'Estudis Autonòmics núm. 42/43: pp. 372–421.
