= Dorothy Molloy =

Irish poet, journalist and artist

Dorothy Mary Molloy
- Dorothy Molloy
- Born: 10 June 1942; Ballina, County Mayo, Ireland
- Died: 4 January 2004 (aged 61); Dublin, Ireland
- Education: University College Dublin
- Known for: Poet, journalist and artist

Dorothy Molloy (10 June 1942 – 4 January 2004) was an Irish poet, journalist and artist.

== Early life ==
Dorothy Mary Molloy was born in Ballina, County Mayo to Patrick Molloy and Catherine Doris Murphy. Her father was a builder and moved the family of three sons and two daughters to Dublin in about 1948. As a result, Molloy was educated in the Loreto Abbey, Dalkey. She went on to University College Dublin, UCD, where she studied languages — specifically French and Spanish. Molloy worked in both countries as an exchange student and au pair. On graduating, Molloy moved to Barcelona where she worked on a project which was to document the history of the Irish on the European continent.

== Career ==
For the UCD Overseas Project Molloy spent considerable time working in the Spanish archives and wrote her work in articles for Éire-Ireland in 1971. She went on to work for the Spanish magazine Destino, the London-based Art and Artists and for the Irish Independent. Molloy also worked as a curator for an art gallery in Spain. She helped organise a solo show for Julia Mateu in Dublin in 1967. During this time she was also painting. In 1970 Molloy won the first prize in the XI Salon Femenino de Arte Actual in Barcelona. She followed this with solo exhibitions in Barcelona in 1971 and 1973. In 1979 Molloy returned to Dublin and had solo exhibitions in Galway in 1984 and Dublin 1991. Her work was selling well. Molloy took the time to return to college and graduated in 1984 with an M.Phil. in medieval studies from UCD and a diploma in psychology. She gained a Ph.D in 1997.

From 1997 to 2003 Molloy directed workshops in UCD and began to submit her poetry for publication. Her first volume of poems, Hare soup was published in 2004 by Faber and Faber. The book was critically acclaimed and won the Irish Times Poetry Now Award in 2005.

However Molloy had been diagnosed with liver cancer in November 2003 and died in Dublin on 4 January 2004.

Gethsemane Day was published in 2006, Long-Distance Swimmer in 2009 and The Poems of Dorothy Molloy, which collected all of these and unpublished and uncollected work, in 2019.

== Personal life ==
Molloy married Andrew Carpenter, a lecturer and professor from the School of English in UCD on 3 February 1983. They had no children.
