= Bernard Weish =

Fictional German linguist

Bernard Weish or Bernard Weiss (or Bernhard, or Weis, depending on the source) was a purported fictional linguist who has been cited as an authority to support theories on the differences between the Valencian and Catalan languages. There is speculation that the character was created either by proponents of Language secessionism such as the Blaverists (Valencian anti-Catalan nationalists/regionalists) to bolster their arguments, or by those who oppose secessionism / to mock it.

At the beginning of the 1980s, a Dr. Bernard Weiss, claimed to be a philologist specialising in Romance languages in the Department of LMU Munich. He circulated papers to blaverist meetings and contributed articles to the Valencian media in support of secessionist linguistic theories regarding Valencian and Catalan. His supposed expertise gave the Blaverists a scholarly source to support their claims, which they previously lacked from any other universities. Dr. Weiss also made the claim to have discovered 11th century manuscripts written in the Mozarabic language by Valencian troubadours such as Bertran Desdelueg (likewise as Bertrand Ofqours), Luís Llach (freely translated as Miqel Jaqson) and Salvatore Coniglia (something like Johny Rabbity).

Despite these assertions, for six years, Dr. Bernard Weiss remained hidden from public view and refused to be photographed, interviewed, or to take phone calls. When a journalist from the Levante-EMV Valencian newspaper contacted LMU Munich to verify Dr. Weiss's credentials, the university states that no one by that name was employed there. Despite this discrepancy, the organisers of the First Congress of the Valencian Language, held in May 1985 in Elche, extended an invitation for Dr. Weiss to be the key speaker.

The Valencian newspaper Las Provincias, known for its support of Blaverism, published contradictory reports on whether Bernard Weiss actually attended the congress as the main lecturer. Some sources claimed he was in attendance, whilst others stated he was not. This discrepancy cast further doubt on the credibility of the supposed linguist.

ÉXITO DEL PRIMER CONGRÉS DE LA LLENGUA VALENCIANA

Elche (De nuestra redacción)

Con la lectura de conclusiones se cerrará hoy el [...]
(...) las sesiones han alcanzado gran altura, destacando la intervención del professor de la Universidad de Münich Bernard Weiss, con un interesante trabajo sobre la lingüística valenciana.

(Las Provincias, 19-05-85, p.2)

SUCCESS OF THE FIRST CONGRESS OF THE VALENCIAN LANGUAGE

Elche (From our redaction)

Today (the Congress) shall end after the conclusions are read...
Sessions have been a success, highlighting the intervention of the professor of the Ludwig-Maximilians-Universität München Bernard Weiss, with a very interesting paper about Valencian linguistics.

(Las Provincias, 85-05-19, p.2)

CONCLUSIONES DEL PRIMER CONGRÉS DE LA LLENGUA VALENCIANA
El idioma valenciano es autóctono

Elche (Vicente Pastor Chillar)

(...) El primer día o fecha inaugural resultó frío, por la escasez de asistentes, que se multiplicaron durante el sábado y, particularmente, el domingo, en que llegaron varios turismos y autocares desde Valencia.
La primera conclusión de la asamblea es que la lengua valenciana constituye un idioma románico autóctono, en el que se da un caso único y sin precedentes (...)
Entre los ponentes han figurado (...) el professor Herran Bernhard Weiss, de la Universidad de Munich, cuya lección fue leída por una hermana suya, al serle imposible el desplazamiento (...)
Entre los acuerdos adoptados figura celebrar el Segundo Congreso y solicitar a S.M. El Rey que conceda de Real a la Academia de Cultura Valenciana.

(Las Provincias, 23-05-1985, p.42)

CONCLUSIONS OF THE FIRST CONGRESS OF THE VALENCIAN LANGUAGE
The Valencian language is autochthonous

Elche (Vicente Pastor Chillar)

The first day was cold, due to the shortage of those presents, who got to be numerous on Saturday and, specially, on Sunday, when many cars and buses arrived from Valencia.
The first conclusion of the meeting is that the Valencian language is an autochthonous Romanic language on which a unique situation and without precedents (...)
Between the lecturers we can count (...) Dr. Herran Bernhard Weiss, from the University of Munich, whose paper was read by his sister, since he couldn't trip (...)
Some of the resolutions are celebrating a Second Congress and asking H.M The King the title of "Royal'' to the "Academy of Valencian Culture".

(Las Provincias, 1985-05-23, p.42)

After this public (dis)appearance, Bernard Weiss vanished from the literary scene and his works were not published again. Blaverists, who had previously fabricated his existence, were forced to admit the truth or face ridicule from their opponents. The alleged manuscripts have yet to be published or made available for public viewing.
