= Anti-Catalan sentiment =

Feeling or expression of hate towards Catalan people

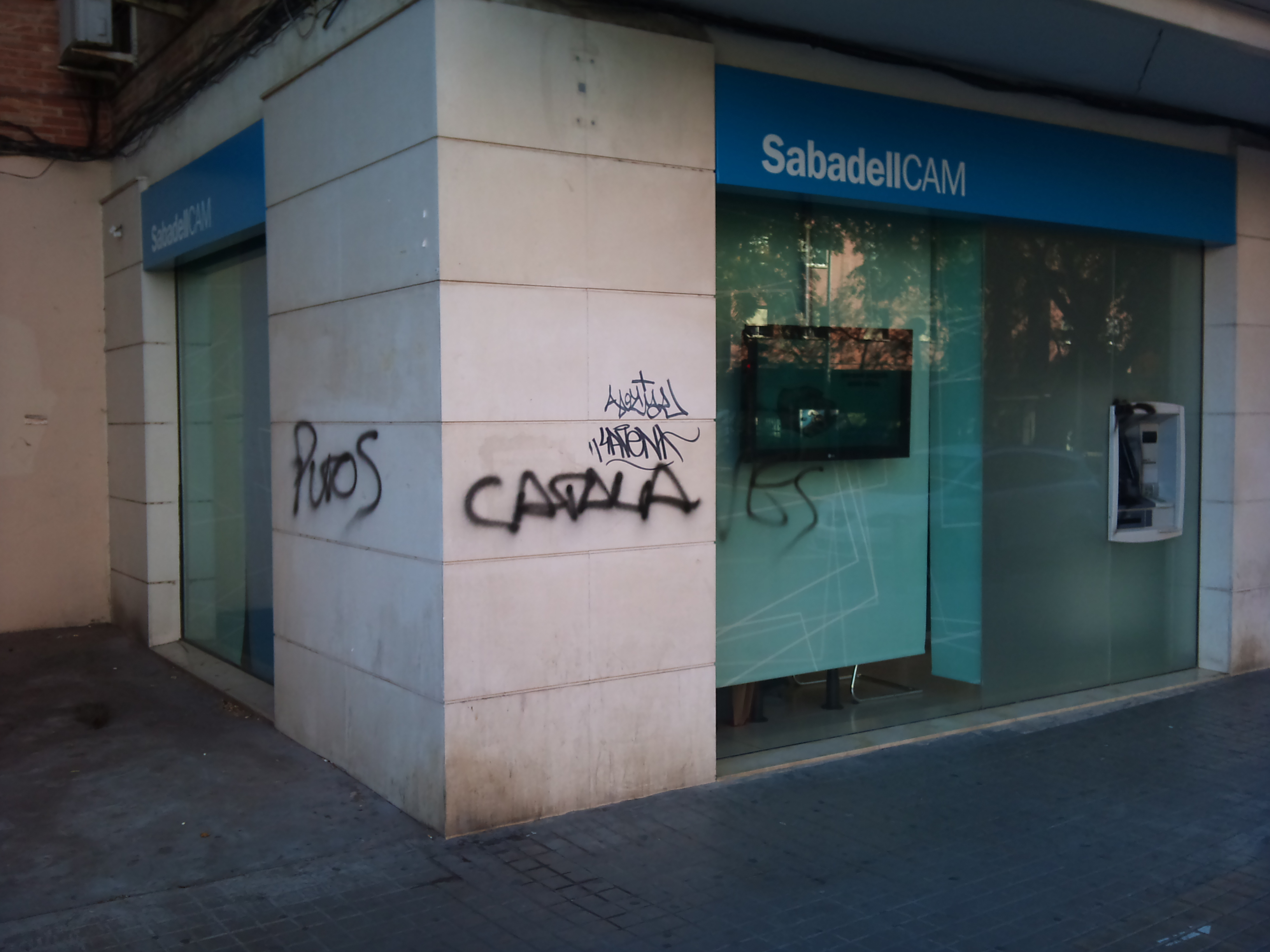
Spanish-language graffiti reading Putos catalanes ('Fucking Catalans') on a SabadellCAM bank office in Valencia, 2012

Anti-Catalan sentiment is the collective name given to various trends in Spain, France and Italy that expresses disdain, discrimination, or hatred for Catalonia, to Catalans, Catalan culture, Catalan language or its history. It can also be referred to as Anti-Catalanism (Catalan: anticatalanisme, IPA: [ˌantikətələˈnizmə]) or Catalanophobia.

== Description ==
In a historical context, anti-Catalanism expresses itself as a hostile attitude towards the Catalan language, people, traditions or anything identified with Catalonia. In a political context it may express itself as the reaction to a perceived intrusion of Catalan political nationalism into the area. In its most extreme circumstances, this may also be referred as Catalanophobia, though it is not a phobia per se. Several political movements, known for organising boycotts of products from Catalonia, are also actively identified with anti-Catalanism. Anti-Catalan sentiment often expresses the denial of the existence, in any degree or form, of Catalan national identity, whether in the past or in the present.

Sometimes, Catalans abroad or within Catalonia have experienced verbal harassment or denial of provision of goods and services, often in reaction to the use of Catalan language.

== History ==
=== Italy in the Middle Ages ===
Historian Antoni Simon states that between the 12th and 15th centuries, the Crown of Aragon's military expansion into Sicily, Sardinia and southern Italy and the entry of Catalan merchants into these markets generated a deep sense of hostility against the Catalans - often identified as Spaniards. Reflections can be found in the literary works of Dante Alighieri, Giovanni Boccaccio, Francesco Petrarca, Luigi Alamanni, Pietro Aretino or Serafino Aquilano. He states that it was an anti-Catalan sentiment that was more cultural-linguistic than political-territorial, due to the protests over the election of Alfonso de Borja in 1455 as Pope Calixtus III for being "barbaric and Catalan".

=== Spain in the early modern period ===
The dynastic union of the Crown of Castile with the Crown of Aragon took place through the Catholic Monarchs. The Castilian hegemony in the newly established Monarchy of Spain left the peripheral realms under a royal government located in Madrid since 1561, a government composed of people mainly of Castilian origin.

At the beginning of the 16th century, King Ferdinand II of Aragon was called, in a derogatory manner, "viejo catalanote" ("old Catalan fool") by the Castilian nobility, being expelled from Castile and seen as an intruder after the death of Queen Isabella I of Castile.

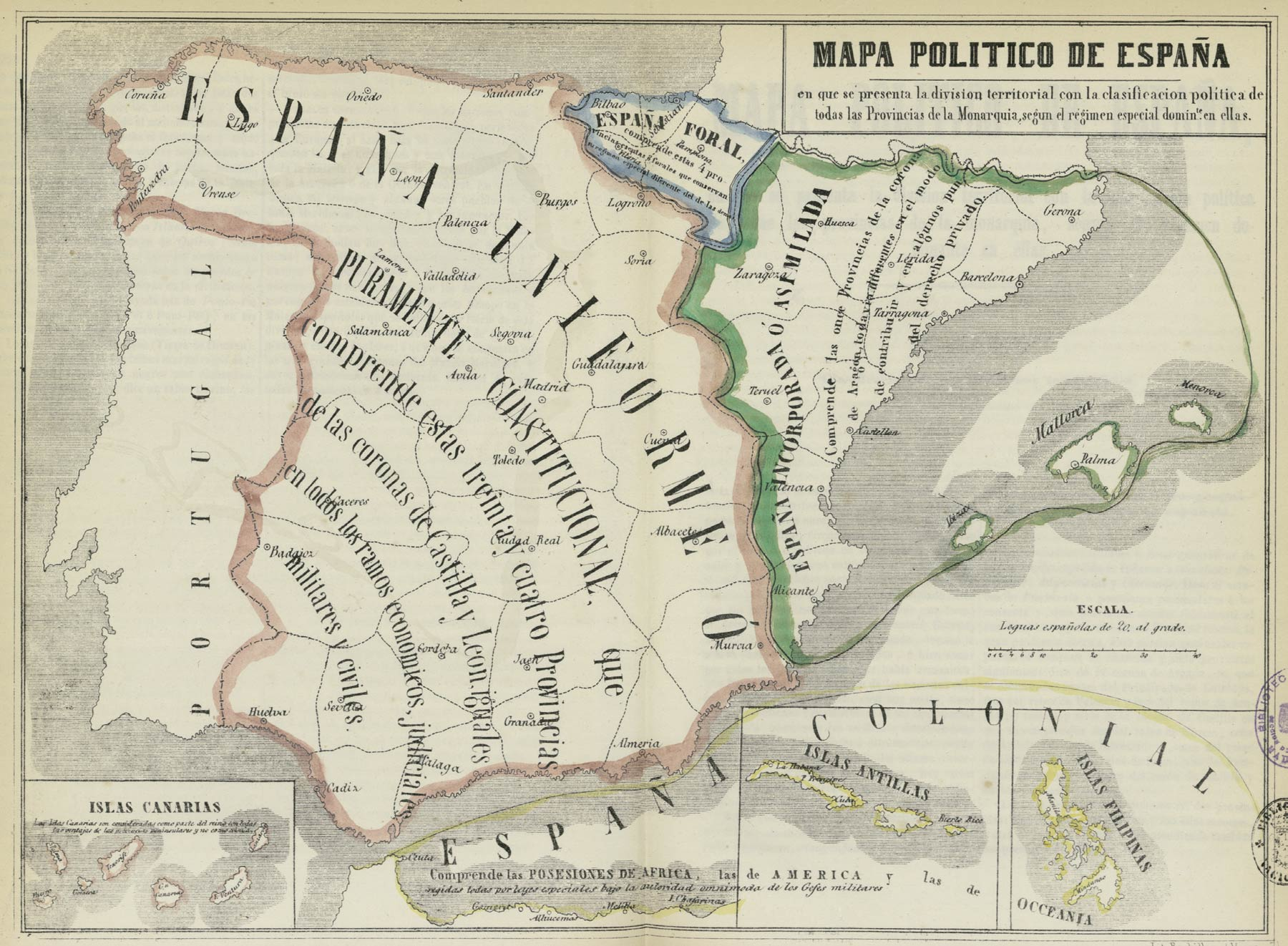
Political map of Spain (1850), divided into four parts: The Fully constitutional Spain (brown), most of the former Crown of Castile; Assimilated Spain (green), the former Crown of Aragon, including the Catalan-speaking lands; Foral Spain (blue), the Basque-speaking territories; and Colonial Spain (yellow)

In accordance with the Nueva Planta decree of 1716 promulgated by Philip V after the War of the Spanish Succession (1701-1714), most of the public legislation and institutions of the Principality of Catalonia was abolished, leading to the marginalization of the Catalan language and culture, favoring instead the Spanish language. The administrative use of the Catalan language was replaced with Spanish. While theoretically the replacement solely affected the Royal Audience, the king provided with secret instructions to the royal officers in Catalan territory: they "will take the utmost care to introduce the Castilian language, for which purpose he will give the most temperate and disguised measures so that the effect is achieved, without the care being noticed."

The Nueva Planta decrees were royal measures aimed at suppressing those who were defeated during the Succession War, and it initiated the creation of a French-style Spanish centralized state in accordance with the laws of Castile, and for the first time founded the Kingdom of Spain. This centralization took quite some time during the nineteenth and early twentieth centuries, reaching maximum levels during the dictatorship of Franco and the White Terror.

=== The 19th and 20th centuries ===
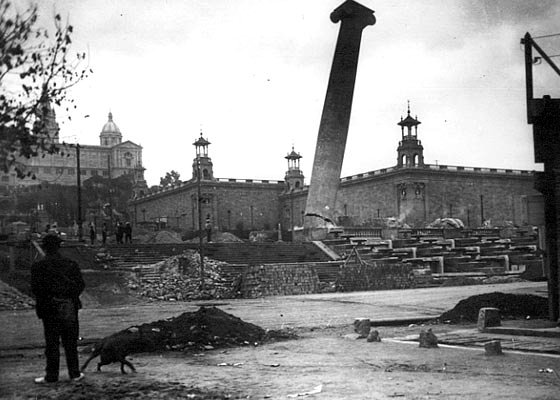
The Four Columns of Montjuïc (Barcelona), which symbolized the four red stripes of the Catalan flag, being demolished in 1928 by Primo de Rivera's dictatorship, when various public symbols of Catalan identity were systematically removed in order to avoid being noticed during the 1929 International Exposition

In the 19th century, the Spanish economy was largely dominated by agricultural production such as cereals from Castile, intended for sale on European markets. In these regions, the bourgeoisie and the landowners, supported by the central state, were favorable to free trade policy. On the contrary, the Catalan bourgeoisie was largely industrial and a producer of textiles, therefore interested in significant customs duties. This fight mobilized most of Catalan society. This struggle creates “in the rest of Spain the image of a selfish and interested Catalonia, determined to achieve its ends even at the expense of any Spanish interest”.

Anti-Catalan sentiments could be found in a pogrom in Argentina, during the Argentinian Tragic Week, in 1919. It was called to attack Jews and Catalans indiscriminately, possibly due to the influence of Spanish nationalism.

=== Persecution in Francoist Spain ===
The dictatorship of Francisco Franco (1939-1975), not only saw the suppression of democratic freedoms, but also the Catalan language and culture were crushed at an unprecedented level, being excluded from the education system and relegated to the family sphere. Castilian (Spanish) became the only language of education, administration, business and the media. During the Spanish Civil War period, despite the presence of Catalans serving in the Rebel army, the rhetorical use of Catalanophobia by the Rebel faction led directly to menaces and outbreaks of ethnic conflict of genocidal nature, as Paul Preston points out in "The Spanish Holocaust":

In the days following the occupation of Lleida [...] republican prisoners identified as Catalans were executed without trial. Whoever they heard speaking in Catalan was very likely to end up arrested. The arbitrary brutality of the anti-Catalan repression reached such a point that Franco himself had to issue an order stipulating that mistakes that could later be regretted should be avoided [...] There are examples of the murder of peasants for no other apparent reason than that of speaking Catalan.

— Paul Preston, The Spanish Holocaust

Even the Falange member Maximiano García recorded the extreme forms of Catalanophobia from the Rebel Faction:

You could frequently hear in certain media the statement that Catalonia should be sown with salt. It reaches such high levels of xenophobia that it would be General Franco himself who would issue an order to stop the genocide that was being committed.

— Maximiano García

On 15 January 1939 Tarragona fell to Franco's troops and the victors celebrated a solemn Catholic mass in the cathedral led by the cleric of the cathedral of Salamanca José Artero who in his homily said: "Catalan scum! You are not worthy of the sun that shines on you." Arrests and summary trials immediately began. On 26 January Franco's troops took Barcelona. According to the testimony of the British military attaché to Franco's government, the first ones to enter the Catalan capital were the troops of the Navarre Brigades of General Solchaga "not because they have fought better, but because they hate better. Especially when the object of hatred is Catalonia or a Catalan."

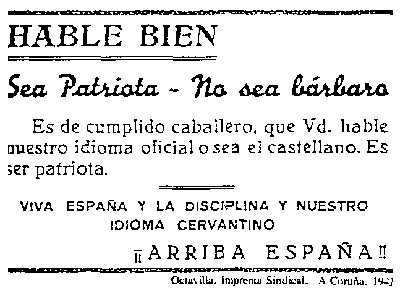
Leaflet of the Francoist Spanish Syndical Organization from 1942 advocating against the use of the other languages spoken in Spain apart from Spanish, calling "barbarians" those who use them. It says, in Spanish: "Speak well. Be patriotic - Don't be barbaric. It is expected from a respectable gentleman to speak our official language, that is to say, Spanish. It is to be a patriot. Long live Spain, and discipline, and our Cervantine language."

Scholars Rafael Aracil, Joan Oliver and Antoni Segura considered that until 1951, the persecution of Catalan language was "total". In some places students had to denounce fellow students who spoke Catalan. During this period, the Catalan language was also prohibited on tombstones. Between 1939 and 1943 book printing in Catalan virtually disappeared.

With the defeat of Nazi Germany in 1945, some of the harsh measures began to be lifted and, while the Spanish language remained the sole promoted one, a limited number of Catalan literature began to be tolerated. However, works aimed at young people were restricted to limit the learning of the written language. Later on, the opening of the regime allowed a small change in the marginalization of the language, such as the broadcast in 1964 of the first television program in Catalan on TVE (Teatre català) and the Nova Cançó (New Song) (1961) movement, though there still were limits such as the ban on Joan Manuel Serrat singing in Catalan at the Eurovision Song Contest in 1968.

In 1968, in a discussion about cultural activity in Catalan language, Catalan businessman J.B. Cendrós tried to get the then Franco's Minister Manuel Fraga Iribarne to lift the order to withdraw from circulation the first edition of the "Illustrated History of Catalonia". To the contrary, Fraga ended up glorifying the various times that Spain had militarily attacked Catalonia and that they were ready to do it again if necessary.

=== After Spanish transition to democracy ===
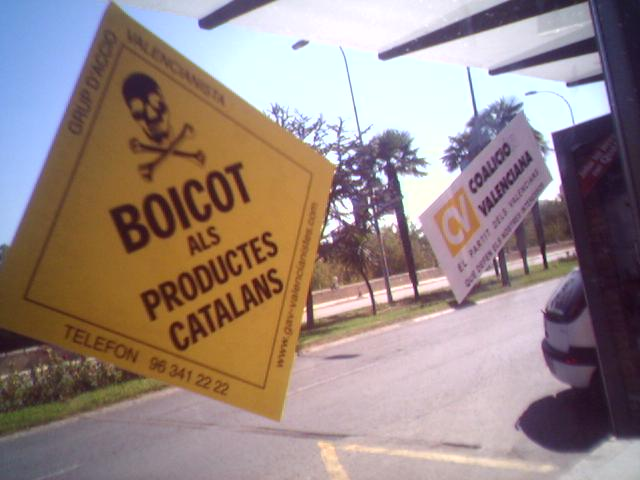
A Catalan-language sign in Valencia city calling for a boycott of Catalan products

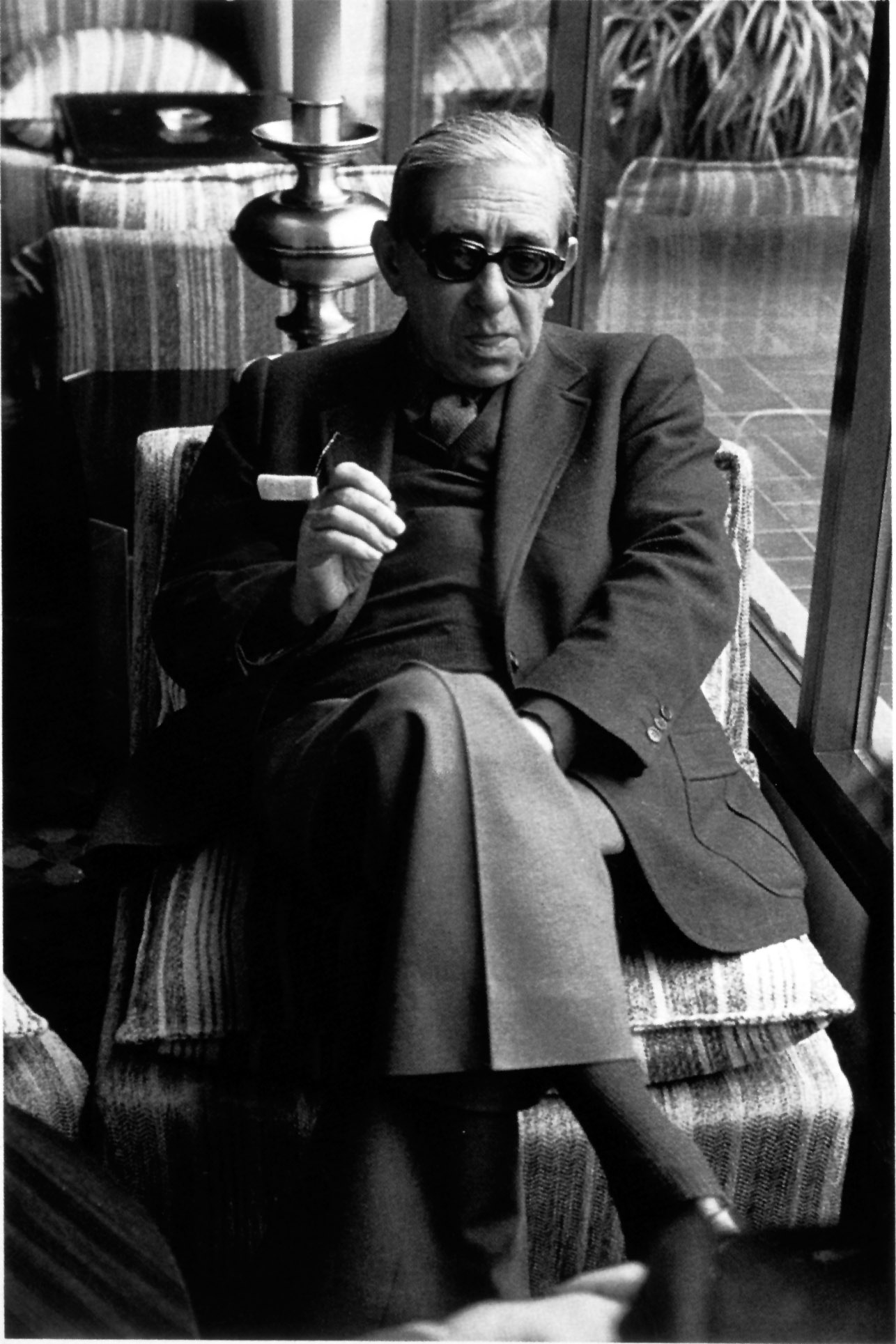
Spanish writer Gonzalo Torrente Ballester opposed the return of the "Salamanca papers" to Catalonia, alleging the "right of conquest"

In 1992 the police operation known as "Operation Garzón" saw the arrest of 45 Catalan pro-independence activists and politicians on the eve of the Summer Olympics held in Barcelona, under the accusation to be members of the armed Catalan pro-independence organisation Terra Lliure without real proof. 25 of the arrested were kept in solitary confinement. They denounced torture at the hands of the Spanish police and threats of violence and rape to them and their families, as well as constant Anti-Catalan and Catalanophobic insults.

The regrowth of anti-Catalan sentiment in Spain during the first decade of the 21st century was marked, among other reasons, by the reform of the Statute of Autonomy of Catalonia and the demands from Catalan society for the return of the "Salamanca Papers", a series of documents massively confiscated from individuals and organizations in Catalonia during the Spanish Civil War by Franco's army in order to enact a harsh repression.

In 2006 the Spanish conservative People's Party (PP) launched an advertising campaign against "the pact of the Catalan Statute and the grievances for Andalusia". However, 14 articles from the Statute of Autonomy of Catalonia that the PP deemed as unconstitutional had an identical wording in the Statute of Autonomy of Andalusia, which was fully supported by the party chaired by Mariano Rajoy.

On the other hand, in the autonomous community of Valencia, anti-Catalanism has been part of the strategy of the political right since the democratic transition, being instrumental to the Valencian right-wing regionalist movement known as "Blaverism", which fueled a violent anti-Catalan campaign against local supporters of the concept of the Catalan Countries, which even included a handful of unsuccessful attacks with explosives against authors perceived as flagships of the concept, such as Joan Fuster or Manuel Sanchis i Guarner. On 11 April 1993, the pro-Catalan independence and anti-fascist Valencian activist Guillem Agulló was assassinated by a group of neo-nazis and Spanish nationalists in Montanejos. Family members and left-wing and pro-independence organizations denounced that the motive for the crime had been political, since the young people who intervened in the murder were known for their Spanish and fascist ideology and that they also knew of the anti-fascist and pro-Catalan ideology of Agulló.

In the 2010s, some organizations and fake news blogs such as Dolça Catalunya, closely linked to the Spanish far-right and the ultra-Catholicism, have maintained and become a vehicle of anti-Catalanism, pseudohistory and language secessionism.

At the same time, the media and social networks are a vehicle for the dissemination of a subtle or explicit Catalanophobia accompanying banal Spanish nationalism.

== Statistics ==
The reality of those feelings has been expressed in studies carried out by different opinion institutes. Constantly, Catalans appeared as the least valued people in Spain; after them would generally be the Basques. In 2020, the Centre d'Estudis d'Opinió carried out a survey asking about the likes and dislikes of Spaniards. According to the results of the report, Catalonia is the autonomous community that, by far, generate the least sympathy from the rest.

== Historical revisionism ==
Anti-Catalanism can be found in the debates concerning the history of Catalonia and its relationship with the history of Spain, generally in non-academic spaces, also being part of banal nationalism. Mostly based on the remaining clichés from Spanish romantic historiography of Castilian basis, promoted and later consolidated by the Francoist dictatorship, Spanish pseudo-historical arguments towards Catalonia seek to minimize or deny any role, external visibility or political organization specific to the Catalan people in the past.

It became particularly widespread during the first decades of the 21st century due to the increasing demands for Catalan self-determination, being often used as a tool to deny any possible historical legitimization of Catalan demands. The dissemination of pseudo-historical arguments was facilitated by media and individuals opposed to Catalonia's self-determination and by those linked to the political right, as well as the diffusion by social networks.

Some of the recurrent topics are:

- Confusion between the concepts of Crown of Aragon and one of its components, the Kingdom of Aragon, thus denying the composite structure of the first one. The direct consequence of this statement is the denial or relativization of the existence of the Principality of Catalonia, under the assumption that the term was just a geographic expression void of any political significance, while claiming that the Catalan counties were an integral part of the Kingdom of Aragon. This gives rise to the false belief that the Principality of Catalonia never existed, but that only the County of Barcelona existed and that it belonged to the Kingdom of Aragon, when in reality both Catalonia and the Kingdom of Aragon were entities of the Crown of Aragon.
- Attribution to Catalonia's institutions and leadership of the early modern age an outdated and oligarchic political behaviour.
- Attribution of the economic growth and industrialization of Catalonia exclusively or mainly to the economic policy of the Bourbon dynasty after the War of the Spanish Succession. This assumptions tend to ignore endogenous factors, such as the previous economic growth of the 17th century, already studied by modern scholars.
- Accusations against Catalan president Lluís Companys (1933-1940) of being the direct responsible for the execution of individuals opposed to the Republican faction during the Spanish Civil War in Catalonia.
- Parodying the pseudo-historical Catalan organization Institut Nova Història, using it as an example to caricature Catalan history. Organizations such as the Institut Nova Història, which defends the alleged Catalan identity of figures such as Columbus and Miguel de Cervantes, have contributed to perceptions of Catalan historiography as less academically rigorous. This has led some Spanish nationalist groups to generalize about Catalan historiography as a whole and, in some cases, to reject or dispute historical facts concerning Catalonia.
- Denial of historical persecution and minorization of the Catalan language.

Certain claims, such as denying the existence of the Principality of Catalonia or describing Catalonia as “a county of the Kingdom of Aragon”, reflect a confusion between the County of Barcelona and the Principality of Catalonia, and between the Kingdom of Aragon and the Crown of Aragon. These claims contrast with a strand of Catalan nationalism that has used the term “Catalan-Aragonese Crown” (Corona catalanoaragonesa) or, less commonly, other names such as “Catalan Crown” to emphasize Catalonia’s importance within the Crown of Aragon. Historically, however, the Crown of Aragon and the Principality of Catalonia were not incompatible concepts. The Crown of Aragon was a common dynastic and political structure, while the Principality of Catalonia was one of its territories, with its own institutions and legal traditions.

Furthermore, the fact that Catalonia was a “principality” and not a “kingdom” like the Kingdom of Valencia or the Kingdom of Aragon did not necessarily mean that Catalonia was a politically subordinate territory or one of little importance. In practice, the Principality had its own institutions, legislation, and political authority, just as the Kingdom of Valencia and the Kingdom of Aragon did within the Crown of Aragon.

=== Linguistic revisionism ===
Within the Blaverist movement in the Valencian Community, there is an anti-Catalan sentiment that is frequently associated with Spanish nationalism. The movement rejects the view that Valencian and Catalan are the same language, contrary to the position of the majority of linguists, or alternatively claims that Valencian predates Catalan and that Catalan is a dialect of Valencian, that is, reversing the order between language and dialect under the supposed theory of Valencian precedence. Arguments cited in support of the claim that Valencian is older than Catalan include the antiquity of Mozarabic kharjas, which are presented as alleged evidence for a Valencian origin predating Catalan (although these texts are not written in Valencian or Catalan, but in Andalusi Romance, a distinct Romance language) and the existence of a Golden Age of Valencian literature (although the existence of a literary golden age in a particular region does not in itself imply that the variety spoken there constitutes a separate language). The earliest known text written in Catalan appears to be a note dating from the 10th or 11th century, written in the margin of a book from the Ripoll Monastery. Another of the oldest surviving Catalan texts is the Homilies d'Organyà, dating from the late 12th or early 13th century. These texts provide significant evidence of the existence and use of Catalan during this period, including the era of the Christian conquest of Valencia. It is therefore cited in discussions in response to claims that Catalan did not yet exist at the time of the conquest.

One of the reasons some people deny that Valencian is a variety of Catalan is the association of the linguistic classification with pan-Catalanism and the Catalan independence movement's alleged political aspirations toward Valencia. However, the assertion that Catalan is spoken in Valencia is a linguistic classification and does not, in itself, imply support for any political movement or territorial claim. The Acadèmia Valenciana de la Llengua recognizes that Valencian and Catalan are the same language.

Similar to the situation in Valencia, a movement exists in the Balearic Islands that disputes the classification of Balearic Catalan as Catalan. However, this position represents a minority viewpoint.

Another example of linguistic revisionism concerning the Catalan language is associated with the work of Pompeu Fabra, who established the modern standard form of Catalan. Some critics argue that his standardization favored the Barcelona dialect over other regional varieties. However, Catalan orthography was designed in part to accommodate the vowel pronunciation characteristic of Western Catalan (which includes Valencian). Other criticisms of Pompeu Fabra stem from his work as an industrial engineer, overlooking the fact that he was also a grammarian.

Some Blaverists argue without a basis that, in the Middle Ages, Catalan was “a dialect or set of dialects derived from Limousin Occitan or Provençal”, in contrast to Valencian, which they regard as the older language. They also accuse Pompeu Fabra of using the Barcelona dialect as the basis for standard Catalan, thereby creating a form of Catalan that they consider subordinate to Valencian or “imposed” in Valencia, viewing also Fabra's standard as “a mixture of dialects” or even “archaisms” that sought to distance themselves from the Spanish language. This theory contrasts with the conventional view in historiography and linguistics, which regards Catalan and Occitan as distinct languages and Valencian as a variety of Catalan, with texts in Catalan that predate the conquest of Valencia. While it is true that Fabra said it was preferable to use native Catalan words rather than Spanish ones, many words of Spanish origin are accepted in standard Catalan, and the theory that standard Catalan is “corrupted” or even “Frenchified” in order to distinguish it from Spanish is unsubstantiated. One of Fabra's tasks was to identify words of Castilian Spanish etymological origin or Castilian Spanish words in colloquial speech and seek to replace them with other terms of Catalan origin in order to purify the language. One such controversy occurred during the 1980s and concerned the word “barco,” which means boat. Although the term was widely used in colloquial speech, it was not accepted by the prevailing language standards of the Institute for Catalan Studies, which favored the traditional form “vaixell.” The latter subsequently became the dominant form in official contexts and education. However, the Acadèmia Valenciana de la Llengua recognizes “barco” as a synonym of “vaixell.”

“Llemosí” was a term used from the 16th century onwards to refer to the Catalan language and it was seen as a possible term for unifying the terms “Catalan” and “Valencian” in order to avoid conflicts. The fact that Catalan/Valencian was historically called “llemosí” does not mean that Catalan is linguistically derived from the Occitan dialect of Limoges. Catalan is also not directly derived from the Provençal dialect, nor does it belong to it.

== See also ==
- Anti-Spanish sentiment
- Black legend
- Lerrouxism
- Polaco (slur)
- State nation
- Vergonha
- History of political Catalanism

== Bibliography ==
- Aracil Martí, Rafael; Oliver i Puigdomènech, Joan; Segura i Mas, Antoni (1998). El mundo actual. De la Segunda Guerra Mundial a nuestros días (in Spanish). Publicacions i Edicions de la Universitat de Barcelona. ISBN 978-8483380062.
- Solé i Sabaté, Josep Maria; Villarroya i Font, Joan (1993). Cronologia de la repressió de la llengua i la cultura catalanes (1936-1975) (in Catalan). Curial. ISBN 9788472569577.
- Ferrer, Francesc (2000). Catalanofòbia. El pensament anticatalà a través de la història. Barcelona: Edicions 62. ISBN 84-297-4657-9.
- Baydal, Vicent; Palomo, Cristian (2020). Pseudohistòria contra Catalunya. De l'espanyolisme a la Nova Història. Vic: Ed. Eumo. ISBN 978-84-9766-689-3.
