= Names of the Catalan language =

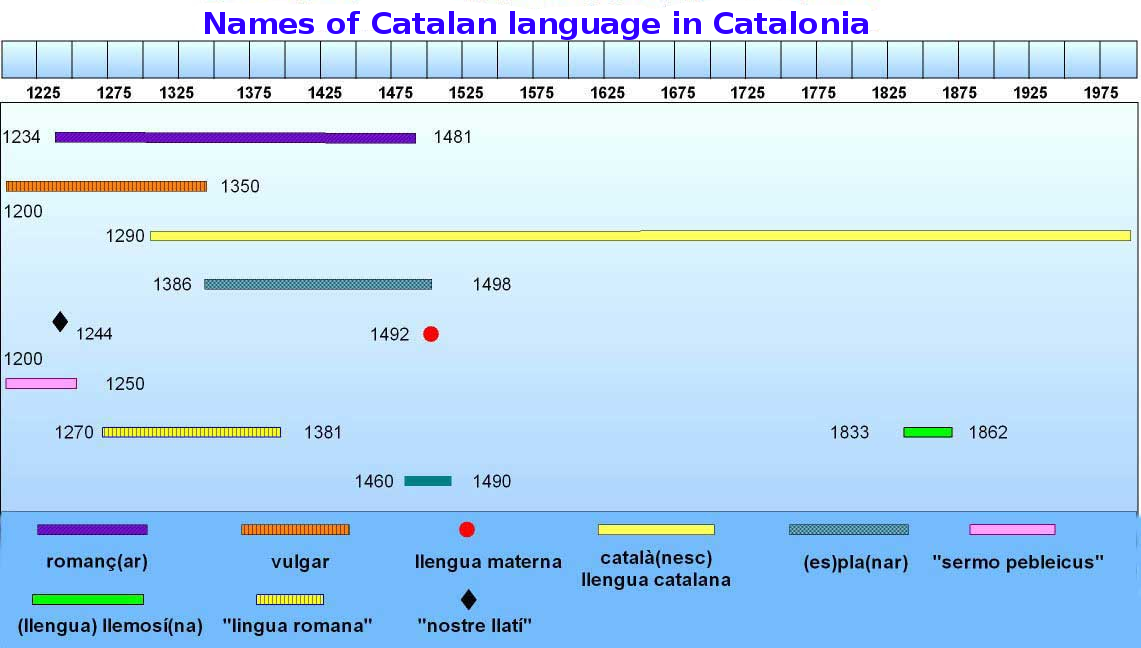

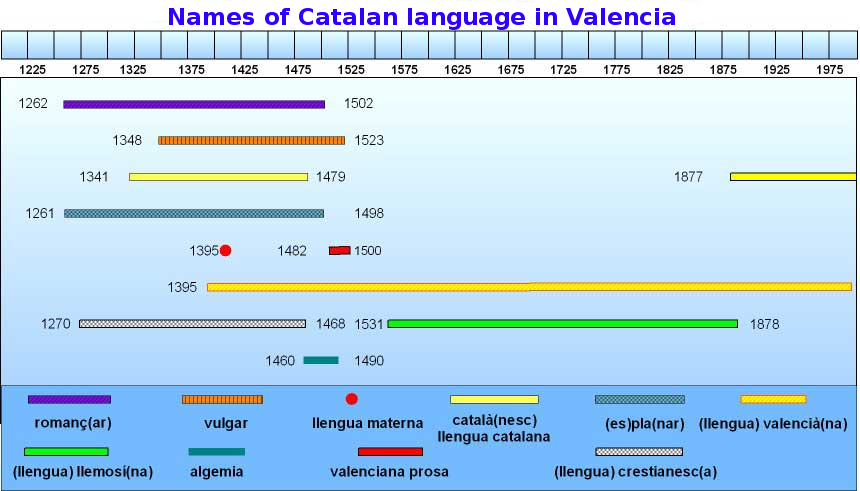

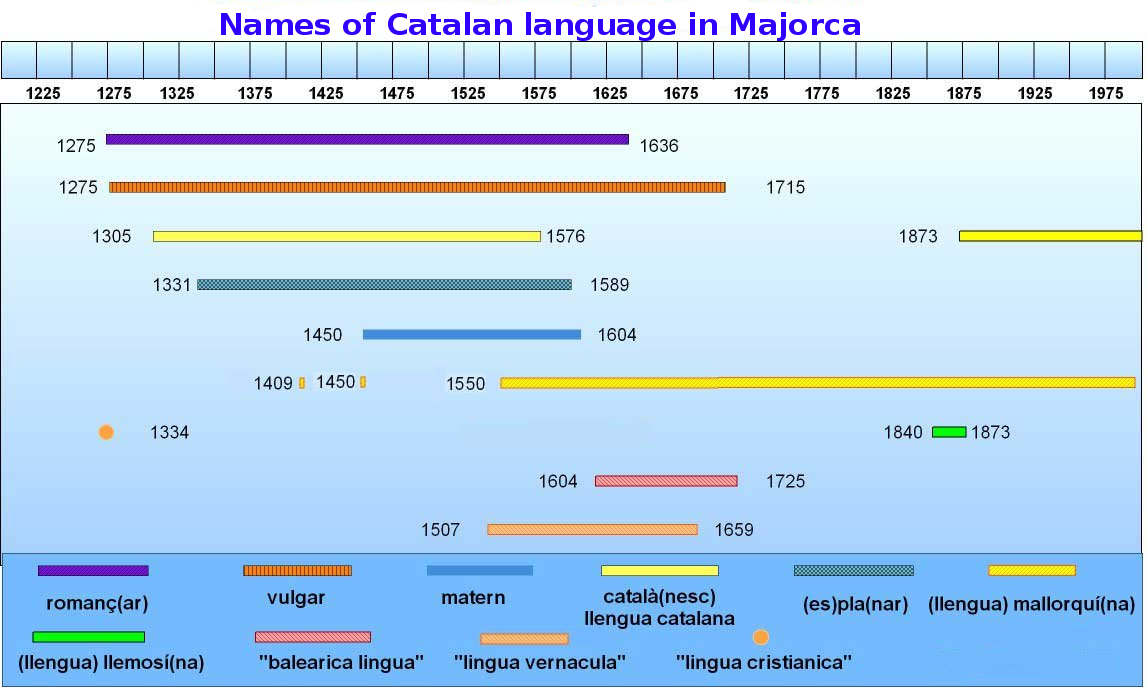

The first names, or glossonyms, of the Catalan/Valencian language formed in a dialectal relation with Latin, in which Catalan existed as a variety. These names already expressed the relationship between the two languages (Council of Tours 813). New names that related Catalan to Rome (lingua romanana, romançar or romanç) came about to dignify the Catalan language in the thirteenth century, though Latinists called it vulgar (or sermo vulgaris) and the people planus, or pla.

During the Muslim presence in Iberia and the Reconquista, it was known as chrestianesch ('Christianish'), or lingua chrestianica, or christianica ('Christian language'), and contrasted with Classical languages, like Arabic and Hebrew; that are linked to Islamic and Judaic traditions. With the language expanding beyond Catalonia, names that indicated its place of origin were favoured: catalanesch (or cathalanesch), valencianesch and balearica or maioricensis. Likewise, the monarchy became associated with the language, which neutralized the political divisions of its territory. The increased range of the language had the effect of unifying the territory that it came to be spoken in, a fact that successive rulers took advantage of to neutralize political divisions, as was recorded by Ramon Muntaner. The first written reference to Catalan appears in the regles de trobar (Rules of the Trobadour's Art, ca. 1290), written in Occitan in Sicily by the Catalan troubadour and monk Jofre of Foixà: "si tu trobes en cantar proençals alcun mot que i sia frances o catalanesch..." (If you find a French or Catalan word in a troubadour song...) By the end of Middle Ages, Latin was less of a universal language, provoking Catalan to receive other names that remarked a local character and the political divisions of the time: materna lingua (or maternus sermo), maioricensis (in the Kingdom of Majorca), valencianesch (in the Kingdom of Valencia). Similarly, when Castile and Aragon were united in the fifteenth century, the range of the Catalan name was reduced to simply mean "from Catalonia" and confusion about the origin of the language led to the apparition of names such as lemosin, or llemosí (Limousin). Before the Renaixença, which revitalized Catalan-language culture, some unpopular terms such as llemosí-català, català i valencià, and bacavès (after balear-català-valencià) were created.

== See also ==
- Valencian language controversy
