= Joan Fuster =

Catalan writer (1922–1992)

- Joan Fuster i Ortells
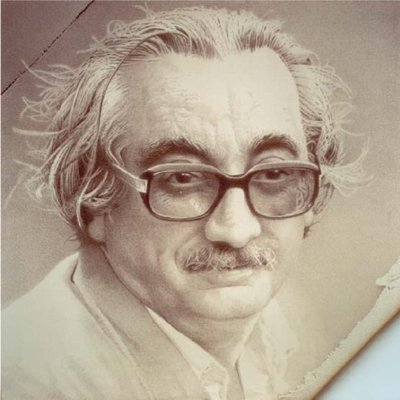
- Joan Fuster
- Born: 23 November 1922; Sueca, Spain
- Died: 21 June 1992 (aged 69); Sueca, Spain
- Occupation: Writer
- Notable work: Nosaltres, els valencians

Joan Fuster i Ortells (Valencian: [dʒuˈaɱ fusˈteɾ i oɾˈteʎs]; 23 November 1922 – 21 June 1992) was an influential Catalan writer. He is considered a major writer in the Valencian language, and his work contributed to reinvigorate left-wing, pro-Catalan nationalism in Valencia during the Spanish transition to democracy. In his influential political essay Nosaltres, els valencians (1962) he coined the term Països Catalans (Catalan Countries) to refer to the Catalan-speaking territories.

== Life and works ==
He was born in the village of Sueca near Valencia, Spain, in a relatively prosperous middle-class family. Both his parents were pious Roman Catholics and Carlists. His father was a renowned local sculptor of mostly religious sculptures. In 1941 he became a member of the fascist organization Falange; however, he later abjured this affiliation. In 1947 Fuster graduated with a degree in law and he received a doctoral degree in Catalan philology in 1985. From 1946 to 1956 he co-directed the magazine Verb with José Albi. Of his first books, all of which are poetry, Escrit per al silenci ("Written for the Silence") (1954) stands out. In 1952 he began his collaborations with the press of Valencia in Levante: this would be one of his more prominent facets. He would continue with it in Destino and in La Vanguardia.

With El descrèdit de la Realitat ("The Discredit of Reality") (1955) he started a notable career as an essayist of vast thematic breadth and whose incisive style was noted for its precise use of adjectives. Another aspect of his work was his erudition and concern with the craft of storytelling and he worked greatly to maintain a literary reviewal he pushed forward in anthologies. His dedication to Valencian themes culminated in 1962 with the publication of what remained as his most known work: Nosaltres els valencians ("We, the Valencians"). This book, together with Qüestió de Noms ("Matter of Names") and El País Valenciano ("The Valencian Country"), are basic books on the history, culture and national identity problem of the Valencian Community from a Catalanist point of view.

He went on with this subject matter with the release of Raimon (1964), Combustible per a falles ("Combustible for Falles") (1967) and Ara o Mai ("Now or Never") (1981), among others. These, parts of his numerous studies and erudite historical and biographical articles, have been collected in the I and III tomes of the Obres completes ("Complete Works"). The Diari ("Day-to-Day Works") (1952–1960) occupy the second volume.

Within the realm of essay writing, he published Figures del temps ("Figures of Times"), Yxart award (1957), Judicis Finals ("Final Judgments") (1960), Diccionari per a ociosos ("Dictionary for Idlers") (1964), Causar-se d'esperar ("Causing Oneself to Wait") (1965), L'home, mesura de totes les coses ("The Man, Measure of All Things") (1967), and others—always within the tradition moral root of classical humanism, close in spirit to the moralists and French reformers (from Montaigne to the encyclopedists), as a critic and skeptic noted for his acid humor. Within his works on history, criticism and literary production, he published La Poesia Catalana ("Catalan Poetry") (1956), Poetes, Moriscos i Capellans ("Poets, Moorish and Cures") (1962), Heretgies, Revoltes i Sermons ("Heresies, Revolts and Sermons") (1968) and Literatura Catalana Contemporània ("Contemporary Catalan Literature") (1972), in addition to three extensive prologues for the works of Joan Salvat-Papasseit (1962), Salvador Espriu (1963) and Josep Pla (1966), joined together in Contra el Noucentisme ("Against Noucentisme") (1978).

In 1987 he collected his poetry into Set llibres de versos ("Seven Books of Verses"). The studies joined together in Llibres i problemes del Renaixentisme ("Books and problems of the Renaissance") (1989) are the fruit of the research carried out in his last few years. In 1994 the works Fuster Inèdit ("Unpublished Fuster") and Fuster Sabàtic ("Sabbatical Fuster") were edited.

He was homosexual.

== Importance ==
Despite having written also a number of fiction pieces, he is best known for his essays, especially the political ones. His most influential work by far was the book Nosaltres els valencians ("We, the Valencians") (1962), whereas other titles such as Qüestió de Noms ("Matter of Names") and Diccionari per a Ociosos ("Dictionary for Idlers") (1963) are well known in the Catalan nationalism. He became the intellectual leader of Valencian nationalism by the end of the 20th century, and was central in proposing the Països Catalans concept, which advocated for unity within Catalan culture as proposed by Catalan nationalists, and assumed vaguely by Valencian nationalists. In these books Fuster asserted that it was necessary to strengthen Valencia's relationships with the other Catalan speaking territories for there to be any chance of defending the autonomous culture of Valencia. In this way he sought to bring a Catalan-based cultural community into existence.

In this sense, Fuster is a political essayist in Catalan of the generations that appeared after the Spanish Civil War.

== Acknowledgement ==
He received the Premi d'Honor de les Lletres Catalanes ("Catalan Letters Award") (1975) and also, in the year 1983, the Medalla d’Or de la Generalitat de Catalunya ("Gold Medal of Catalonia's Generality"). In 1984 he was named doctor honoris causa by the University of Barcelona and by the Autonomous University of Barcelona. In 1986 he was appointed as professor of literature in the University of Valencia.

== Murder attempt ==
On 11 September 1981, two bombs exploded in his house, damaging heavily his library and archive. Nobody was prosecuted, but it is widely believed that it was the anti-Catalan far right's response to Fuster's political and cultural position.

== Digital editions of Joan Fuster's books ==
- Nosaltres els valencians (in Catalan)
- Qüestió de noms (in Catalan)
