= La Forja =

La Forja - Jovent Revolucionari The Forge - Revolutionary Youth
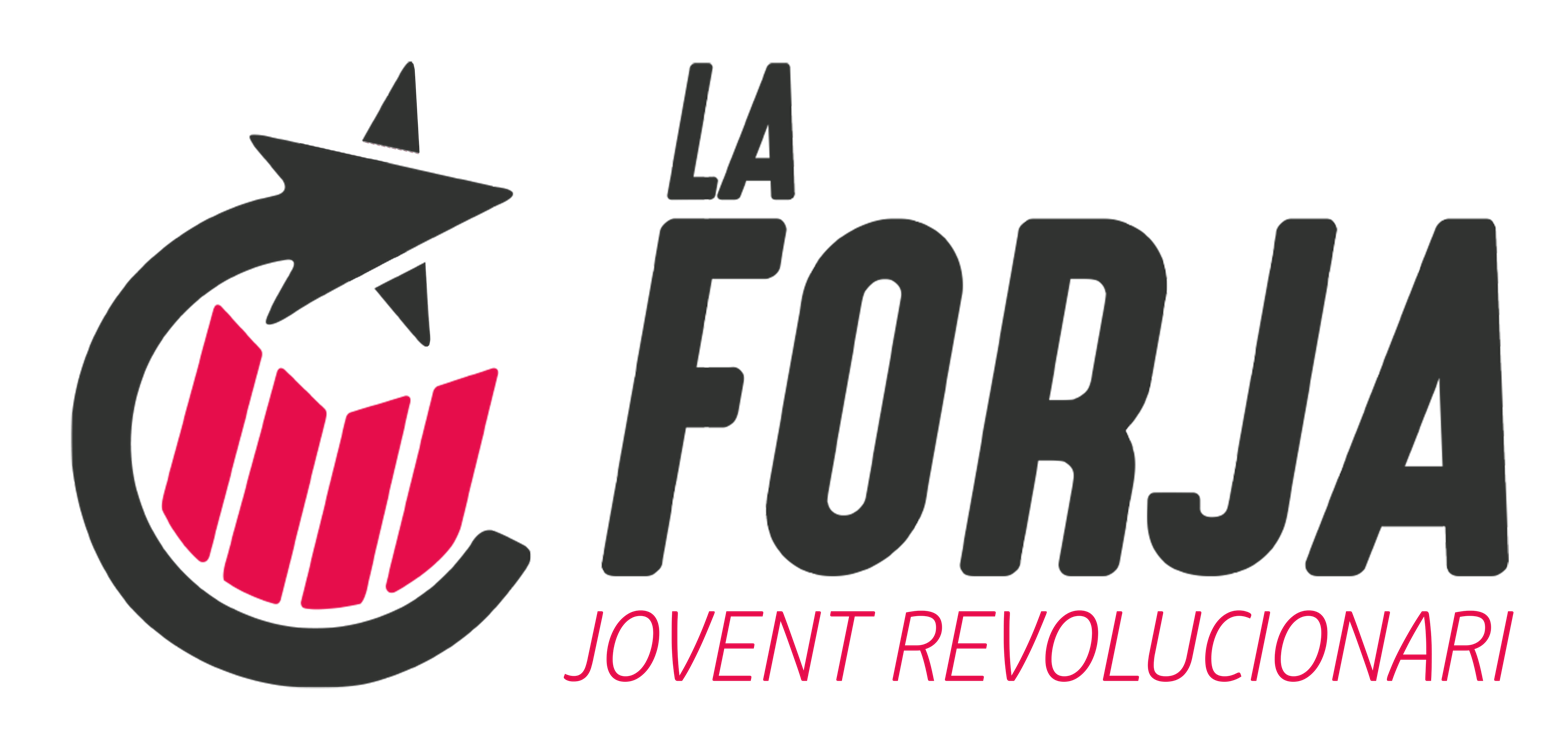
- Spokesperson: Judit Costa
- Founded: 4 January 2018
- Headquarters: C/ Elisi, 20, Barcelona
- Ideology: Catalan independence Marxism; Socialism; Feminism; Ecologism
- Mother party: Poble Lliure; Popular Unity Candidacy
- Website: www.laforja.cat

La Forja - Jovent Revolucionari (The Forge - Revolutionary Youth) is a left-wing Catalan independence youth organization that is active in all the Catalan Countries. La Forja is part of the Popular Unity Candidacy–Constituent Call (CUP-CC) coalition and has very close ties with the political party Poble Lliure.

== History ==
=== Creation of Arran and split ===
Before 2012, the left-wing Catalan independence movement had two youth organizations: Maulets-JIR and CAJEI. The first was founded in 1999 through the union of Maulets (the youth wing of Catalunya Lliure) and the Catalan Revolutionary Youth (JIR, youth of People's Unity Assembly). The second group was created in 2002 by members of Endavant. Both organizations merged in 2012 creating Arran. Soon after the merge, some ex-members of Maulets-JIR (especially those close to the Movement for Defence of the Land), started to consider that the leadership of the new organization was following the political line of CAJEI. These ex-members of Maulets-JIR became involved in the creation of the youth of the Catalan National Assembly (ANC), the National Assembly of Pro-Independence Youth (ANJI). Due to this, they were threatened with expulsion from Arran.

In 2014, groups of ex-Maulets created, along with other youth organizations, the Estudiants 9N movement, which organized a student strike to support the unofficial self-determination referendum. During the referendum campaign, some local chapters of Arran (Arbúcies, for example) made posters promoting a 'Yes' vote; the leadership of Arran ordered that these posters be withdrawn. At the national assembly of that year, most members of Arran voted to expel those who had participated in the ANC. Their objection stems from the ANC's stance to fight only for the independence of Catalonia and not all of the Catalan Countries. The vote was not valid because it did not reach the 70% of necessary quorum.

This vote caused a split in Arran, with various local groups leaving the organization, including Alt Maresme, València, Castelló de la Plana, Badalona, Cerdanyola del Vallès and Girona

=== Creation of the Youth Assemblies for Popular Unity ===
On 28 December 2015, the Assemblies of the Alt Empordà, Alt Maresme, Badalona, Berguedà, Cerdanyola del Vallès, Mataró and Sants celebrated the Founding Congress of the Youth Assemblies for Popular Unity (AJUP) in the town of Celrà. The political declaration of AJUP declared the Catalan Countries independentism, Marxist socialism, feminism and ecologism as the main ideological lines of the organization. AJUP also considered the CUP as its "political reference".

=== Foundation of La Forja ===
In the second National Congress of AJUP, held on 3 and 4 February 2018 in Canet de Mar, the organization was refounded as La Forja - Jovent Revolucionari. At the time of the foundation they were present in the comarques of Alt Empordà, Barcelonès, Gironès, Maresme, Segarra, Tarragonès, Vallès Occidental and Terres de l'Ebre. La Forja is part of Popular Unity Candidacy–Constituent Call, Platform for the Right to Decide of the Valencian Country and the youth of the Catalan National Assembly. La Forja is also very close to Poble Lliure and the Intersindical-CSC trade union.

On 10 April 2018, two members of La Forja were arrested by the Mossos d'Esquadra in an operation against the CDRs, both being released the next day. Another 3 members of the organization are being investigated, accused of "damages and coercion", by the Spanish Justice since October 2018. La Forja has denounced these cases as part of a repressive strategy against the Catalan independence movement.
