= Socialist Organisation of National Liberation =

Socialist Organisation of National Liberation Organització Socialista d'Alliberament Nacional
- Leader: Pere Iu Baron i Xixell
- Founded: 1977
- Dissolved: 1979
- Split from: Catalan Workers' Left
- Merged into: Independentists of the Catalan Countries
- Headquarters: Roussillon
- Ideology: Catalan independence Revolutionary socialism
- Political position: Far-left
- Sister organization: PSAN-P
- Allies: Galician People's Union; Herri Batasuna

Socialist Organisation of National Liberation (in Catalan: Organització Socialista d'Alliberament Nacional, OSAN) was a pro-Catalan independence radical socialist political party in the Catalan Countries. OSAN was formed by Pere Iu Baron i Xixell and his affiliates who split from Catalan Workers' Left (Catalan: Esquerra Catalana dels Treballadors, ECT) in 1977. The party was located in Northern Catalonia and maintained close relations with Catalan separatist organizations as well as Galician and Basque ones, specifically the Galician People's Union and Herri Batasuna.

OSAN maintained close contact with Socialist Party of National Liberation - Provisional, which was a radical, Provisional IRA-inspired split from Socialist Party of National Liberation. OSAN and PSAN-P then unified at the 1979 Congress in Rià (Conflent) and gave rise to Independentists of the Catalan Countries (Catalan: Independentistes dels Països Catalans, IPC). The organization published the magazine La Nova Falç. In 2000, the name of the organization was reused by reformist socialist Endavant–Organització Socialista d'Alliberament Nacional, an unconnected Catalan party.

== History ==
The organization was a part of several splits that socialist Catalan organization experienced in late 1970s following the end of the Francoist regime and reintroduction of democracy in Spain. More moderate members of these organizations wanted to enter the mainstream political scene, while more radical factions pointed to the failure of the new regime to persecute former Francoist and move away from their legacy of centralization. The first PSAN (Socialist Party of National Liberation), incorporated into the anti-Francoist struggle and was one of such organizations to experience two significant splits in this period.

In March 1974, some of its founders (Caries Castellanos and the sisters Eva and Blanca Serra) criticised the party's followers of the PSUC communists and its tendency to rely on Spanish solutions. They then created the PSAN-provisional, a small but active group that was to encourage the most radical and clear-cut independentism of this stage. PSAN-P quickly established contact with OSAN, which split from the Maoist Catalan Workers' Left. OSAN was unique in that it was located and active in Northern Catalonia, which is owned by France. Apart from Northern Catalan revolutionaries, OSAN also included exiled Catalanits from the South, such as Josep de Calassanç Serra i Puig.

After the 1st Independence Conference of 1977, PSAN-P saw the need to create its own distinct political space. The Provisionals, who were always very critical of the main PSAN line took on the name of "Provisionals" and opedt to use the name of independence as their main brand. On 3 March 1979, PSAN-P merged with OSAN to found the IPC in a festive event held in Northern Catalonia. The merger was to give credibility to the new project, given that it was a party that is not strictly "princely" in scope. The IPC had a more stabilised organisation after overcoming the serious problems suffered by both OSAN and PSAN-P, and allowed it to attract new militants from other groups such as the Comunistes Catalans Independents. The foundation of Independentistes dels Països Catalans by both organizations was considered groundbreaking in that it sought to expand the area of operation of revolutionary Catalan organizations beyond Catalonia alone, and expand into Catalan areas in France.

IPC then promoted strategy based above all on the attempt to promote the struggle from popular movements and the promotion of sectoral alternatives specific to independence in order to pursue a policy of confrontation with the Spanish state on all fronts. The IPC undertook the task of creating pro-independence sectoral organisations which began to weave the pro-independence network that would emerge in the early 1980s. Despite the ideological disputes between PSAN-P and the official PSAN, IPC and PSAN closely cooperated together and they laid foundations to the creation of the Movement for Defence of the Land (Catalan: Moviment de Defensa de la Terra, MDT) in 1984, which was the spearhead of the independence movement and the more radical Terra Lliure.

While OSAN was a short-lived organization, it became a part of important and influential movements such as the IPC and MDT, which gave it a unique place in the culture of socialist-aligned Catalanists. In 2000, a reformist socialist party known as Endavant took on the name of OSAN, with the full name of the party being Endavant–Organització Socialista d'Alliberament Nacional.

== See also ==
- Socialist Party of National Liberation - Provisional
- Socialist Party of National Liberation
- Catalan Workers' Left
- Independentists of the Catalan Countries
- Movement for Defence of the Land
- Endavant
