= Left Nationalists =

Left Nationalists Nacionalistes d'Esquerra
- Founded: 1979
- Dissolved: 1984
- Merged into: Agreement of Left Nationalists; Moviment d'Esquerra Nacionalista
- Headquarters: Barcelona
- Ideology: Socialism; Catalan independence Ecologism; Països Catalans; Feminism; Antimilitarism
- Political position: Left-wing

Left Nationalists (Catalan: Nacionalistes d'Esquerra; NE, NdE or Nd'E) was a Catalan socialist and independentist political organization founded in 1979 from historical militants of the Socialist Party of National Liberation (PSAN), National Front of Catalonia, Catalan Communist Collective and independents linked to social movements. Its structure was based in local assemblies, and claimed the right to self-determination of Catalonia within a confederal Catalan Countries. NE also defined itself as national-popular and socialist. The party attracted activist from social movements, specially environmentalists, feminists, gays, youth, etc. The most representative were Jordi Carbonell, Josep Maria Espinàs, Magda Oranich, Avel·lí Artís i Gener and Armand de Fluvià. NE disbanded in 1984.

== History ==
=== Foundation ===
The party had its roots in the Group of Independents and Left Nationalists created by Josep Maria Espinàs, Max Cahner i Garcia Jordi Carbonell and Miquel Sellarès to promote a Spanish Senate candidacy in the 1979 Spanish legislative elections. This was supported by some members, including some town councillors, of the PSAN and the FNC.

After the success of the demonstration on 11 September 1979, called by the independentist left, in which 20,000 people participated, the Group chose an interim secretariat formed by Joan Albert Abril i Pons, Jordi Carbonell, Jaume Fuster, Josep Ferrer, Josep Maria López Llaví, Marc Palmés i Giró, Enric Pedrosa, Miquel Peiró, Jordi Vilanova, and i Martí Metge, who organized a preparatory meeting on 1 December, would make an analysis of the situation and start creating a new political movement.

On 16 December 1979, NE held its founding assembly in the Casino of El Poblenou, with 1,000 attendees, including Josep Huguet i Biosca (PSAN), Joan Olmos (Catalan Communist Collective), Jordi Caupena (FNC), Miquel Peiró, Josep Maria Espinàs and Jordi Carbonell, which approved the six basic points of the manifesto of NE:

- Affirmation of the right of self-determination and the national sovereignty of Catalonia in the context of the Catalan Countries.
- Proposing a popular alternative to defend workers, women, ...
- Rupture with the system reform of the Spanish transition.
- Constitute a grassroots movement, based on assemblies to give strength the party.
- Solidarity with all peoples struggling for liberation.
- Defending those who are repressed because of the Catalan national demands.

Among the minimum objectives of the party, the most important were breaking the Spanish autonomic system, recognizing the right to self-determination and the right to the federation of the Catalan Countries, abolition of the provinces, Catalan being the only official language and a Catalan Parliament with full powers in Catalonia and in the new Catalan institutions.

The intention of the founders of NE was to organize a unitary movement encompassing all left-wing independentists. On 13 January 1980, the PSAN in the assembly of Vinaròs suffered a split between the moderate wing of the party, which supported working within the new movement and committing it to institutional participation (Josep Huguet Francesc Codina), and the opposing sector (led by Josep Guia). On 2 February, an extraordinary congress of the FNC in Vilafranca del Penedès, decided not to support NE, but a sector headed by Francesc Espriu, Antoni Malaret i Amigó and Josep Guillem split from the party and joined NE. The Catalan Communist Collective (CCC), led by Joan Oms, joined NE, as did part of the Catalan Workers Bloc (BCT) (including Josep-Lluís Carod-Rovira). The majority of the members of the new movement, however, were independent from the environmentalist, anti-militarist, LGBT and feminist movements, as well as intellectuals and artists like Jordi Carbonell, Maria Mercè Marçal, Lluís Llach, Maria Àngels Anglada, Joan Oliver i Sallarès Pere Quart, Avel·lí Artís-Gener Tísner, Josep Maria Espinàs and Armand de Fluvià i Escorsa.

=== The elections of 1980 and the construction of the party ===
On 31 December 1979, 57 representatives were elected to the Political Council and 15 to the secretariat. 54 comarcal councillors supported the new party. On 3 February 1980 NE held its first assembly in Manresa.

NE presented lists to the elections to the Parliament of Catalonia in 1980, but suffered competition from BEAN, that tried to form a single left-wing independentist block, but failed. On 18 March, organized a Grand Meeting of the Catalan Sports Palace in Barcelona, with performances by Celdoni Fennel and Lluís Llach and support of people from other Catalan Countries like Vicent Andrés i Estellés, Eliseu Climent, Biel Oliver, Sebastià Serra i Pere Jofre (Socialist Party of Mallorca), Josep Maria Llompart, Isidor Marí Mayans, Miquel Mayol (Esquerra Catalana dels Treballadors), Andreu Murillo Tudurí (Socialist Party of Menorca) i Vicent Ventura. The results were:

Province	Vote	%
Barcelona	32,324 votes	1.54
Girona	5,427 votes	2.39
Lleida	2,880 votes	1.80
Tarragona	4,167 votes	1.87
Total	44,798 votes	1.66
