= Guillem Agulló i Salvador =

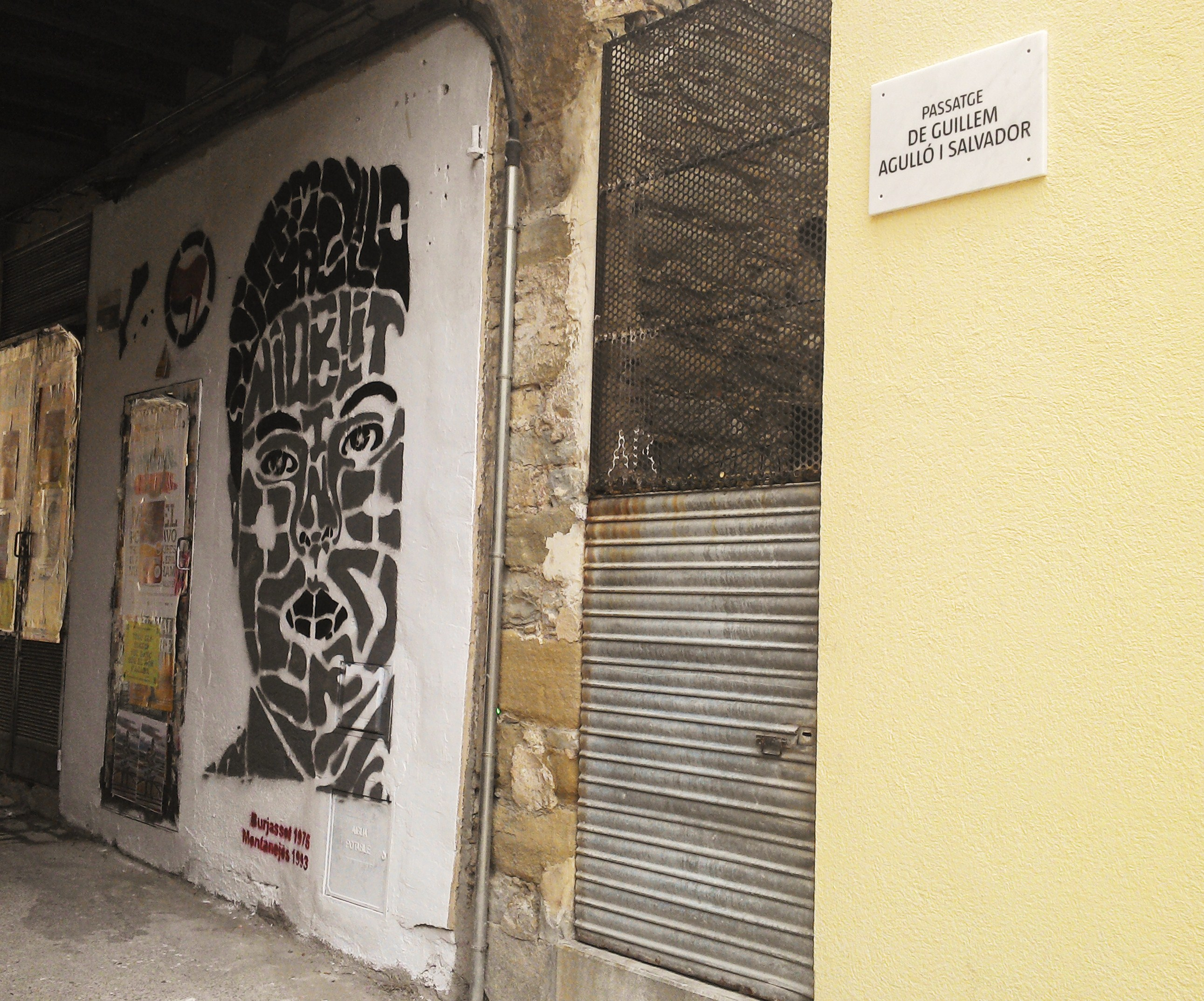
Passage and mural in honour of Guillem Agulló i Salvador in Vic (Catalonia).

Guillem Agulló i Salvador (Burjassot, 1974 – Montanejos, 1993) was a young Valencian active in the pro-independence and revolutionary political organization Maulets. He was murdered on April 11, 1993 at age 18.

== Death ==
In the early morning of April 11, 1993, Guillem Agulló was stabbed to death in Montanejos, Alto Mijares, by a group of youngsters involved in far right organizations. He was 18 years old. A number of political parties claimed that it was a political murder. With the sole exceptions of People's Party and Valencian Union, the crime was condemned by all Valencian political parties.

=== Trial ===
The trial in the murder case was held in Castelló de la Plana in 1995. The judge condemned one of the accused, Pedro Cuevas, who had confessed to the stabbing, to 14 years in prison, and acquitted the rest of the defendants. Pedro Cuevas was released after 4 years in prison and during the 2007 Spanish municipal elections was a candidate for city council for the far right political party Alianza Nacional in Xiva de Bunyol.
