= List of trade unions in Spain =

A list of trade unions in Spain.

== Unions ==
- Agrarian Trade Union Federation
- Andalusian Workers' Union
- Central Sindical Independiente y de Funcionarios (CSIF)
- Coordinadora Obrera Sindical (COS)
- Confederación General del Trabajo (CGT)
- Confederación Nacional del Trabajo (CNT)
- Confederación Intersindical Galega (CIG)
- Confederación Sindical Solidaridad Obrera
- Euskal Langileen Alkartasuna (ELA-STV)
- Intersindical Región Murciana
- Intersindical-CSC
- Langile Abertzaleen Batzordeak (LAB)
- Spanish Trade Union Organisation
- Typographic Workers Trade Union
- Unión de Uniones de Agricultores y Ganaderos
- Unión General de Trabajadores (UGT)
- Unión Sindical Obrera
- Workers Collectives
- Workers in Struggle Collectives
- Workers' Commissions (CCOO)
