= People's Unity Assembly =

People's Unity Assembly Assemblea d'Unitat Popular
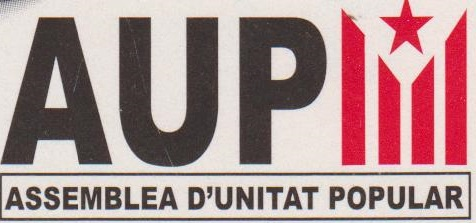
- Founded: 1993
- Dissolved: 1996
- Merger of: Assemblea Unitària per l'Autodeterminació; Movement for Defence of the Land-IDP Faction (MDT-IPC); Members of La Crida
- Merged into: Republican Left of Catalonia; Platform for the Unity of Action
- Headquarters: Barcelona
- Ideology: Catalan independence Socialism; Països Catalans
- Political position: Left-wing
- Colors: Red; Yellow
- Mayors in Catalonia: 2 / 948

The People's Unity Assembly (Catalan: Assemblea d'Unitat Popular, AUP) was an independentist organisation and movement active between 1993 and 1996. The AUP was created by the Movement for Defence of the Land-IDP Faction (MDT-IDP), militants of La Crida, different local political organisations and independents. The AUP was close to the Republican Left of Catalonia (ERC). The AUP had the support of the mayors of Arbúcies and Sant Pere de Ribes.

== History ==
The AUP was very active during its existence. The organisation made campaigns against the Spanish Constitution and in favor of independence. In 1995 the AUP supported, and went along, with the MDT-IDP in the municipal elections of that year, but at the same time the organisations was very close to thesis of ERC. In January 1996 a number of members of the AUP joined ERC and the organisation was dissolved. The opponents to that decision founded the Platform for the Unity of Action (PUA).
