= Unity of action =

Unity of action or Unity in action may refer to:

- Classical unities - A tripartite theory of dramatic tragedy originating from Italy in the 16th century, which includes "unity of action"
- Freedom of discussion, unity of action - A phrase originating from Vladimir Lenin, typically referring to democratic centralism. A common variant is also "unity in action."
- Platform for the Unity of Action - A former Catalan independentist and libertarian socialist party in Catalonia.
- Unity in Action Party - A minor political party in the United Kingdom.
- The Unity of Action Pact - A pact of coordination between Italian socialist and communist parties around the 1930s.
