= Communist Party of the Valencians =

Communist Party of the Valencians Partit Comunista dels Valencians
- Leader: Víctor Baeta
- Founded: May 1, 1987
- Dissolved: 1991
- Headquarters: Valencia
- Ideology: Communism; Republicanism; Federalism; Valencian nationalism
- 1. Split from PCPV; 2. Merged into MDT

Communist Party of the Valencians (in Catalan: Partit Comunista dels Valencians) was a political party in Valencian Community, Spain. The party was founded in the early 1980s, by a group of former PCPV militants. The leader of PCV was Víctor Baeta.

Around 1990 the party integrated itself into the Moviment de Defensa de la Terra, an organization tied to the Independentistes dels Països Catalans.
