= Committees for the Defense of the Referendum =

- Formation: September 2017
- Type: Civil Organisation
- Purpose: Defending the mandate of 2017 Catalan referendum and the Catalan Independence Movement as a whole.
- Location: Catalonia

Committees for the Defense of the Referendum (CDR), or Referendum Defense Committees, are the neighborhood groups set up in Catalonia prior to the 2017 Catalan independence referendum in the wake of the 2017 Spanish constitutional crisis to carry out the referendum swiftly in spite of the Spanish government's imposition of a ban on the unilateral referendum.

== History ==
These committees were formed in the month of September before the referendum on 1 October 2017 in order to mobilize and the people to vote and carry out propaganda. Meetings were held in various villages and cities of Catalonia to organize the people and decide their role during the referendum under predicted police crackdown. CDRs are mainly composed members from far-left separatist organisations like Popular Unity Candidacy, Endavant and radical youth groups like Arran.

== Activities ==
On the day of the referendum the CDRs defended the schools where the voting process was held. CDRs used Telegram to gather and organise voters and urged them to remain peaceful. The organizers occupied dozens of schools for voting purpose.

After the impact of Operation Anubis on 1 October, the Catalan pro-independence organizations called for the 2017 Catalan general strike, where CDRs organized themselves into strike committees.
