= Socialist Party of National Liberation =

Socialist Party of National Liberation Partit Socialista d'Alliberament Nacional
- Secretary-General: Josep Guia
- Founded: 1968
- Dissolved: 20 October 2015
- Split from: National Front of Catalonia
- Headquarters: València
- Newspaper: Lluita
- Youth wing: 1972–1984: Catalan Revolutionary Youth; 1988–2012: Maulets; 2012–2015: none
- Ideology: Socialism; Catalan independence Països Catalans
- National affiliation: Catalan Solidarity for Independence
- Colors: Orange; Red; Yellow

Website
- psan.cat

The Socialist Party of National Liberation (Catalan: Partit Socialista d'Alliberament Nacional, PSAN) was an pro-Catalan independence party active in Catalonia. The PSAN was created in 1968 following a split in the more leftist sector of the National Front of Catalonia. Initially it was only present the Catalonia, but later also gained presence in the French region of Roussillon (September 1971), the Valencian Country (July 1974) and the Balearic Islands (February 1976). The party was illegal and clandestine until 1978, when all parties were fully legalised, after the Franco Dictatorship.

== History ==
=== Origins ===
In March 1969 the Constituent Assembly of the party was celebrated. In this assembly the organization officially adopted a independentist ideology. Joaquim Maurín, Jaume Vicens i Vives and the classical international marxist authors were the most important theoretical inspirations the party. The influence of the Third World revolutionary movements, specially the Cuban Revolution, the Vietcong and the Algerian FLN was also very important. The Basque organization Euskadi Ta Askatasuna (ETA) and the Galician People's Union (UPG) were also references, both in theory and practice. The main objectives of the party were: the expulsion of the occupation forces, the territorial unity of the Catalan Countries, the creation of a Catalan socialist state and the constitution of a Catalan socialist society in an international socialist society. The strategic line of the party was defined as:

- Awareness of dual national and social oppression.
- Organisation of the working class and other popular sectors.
- Organizational autonomy and generalization of the struggle.

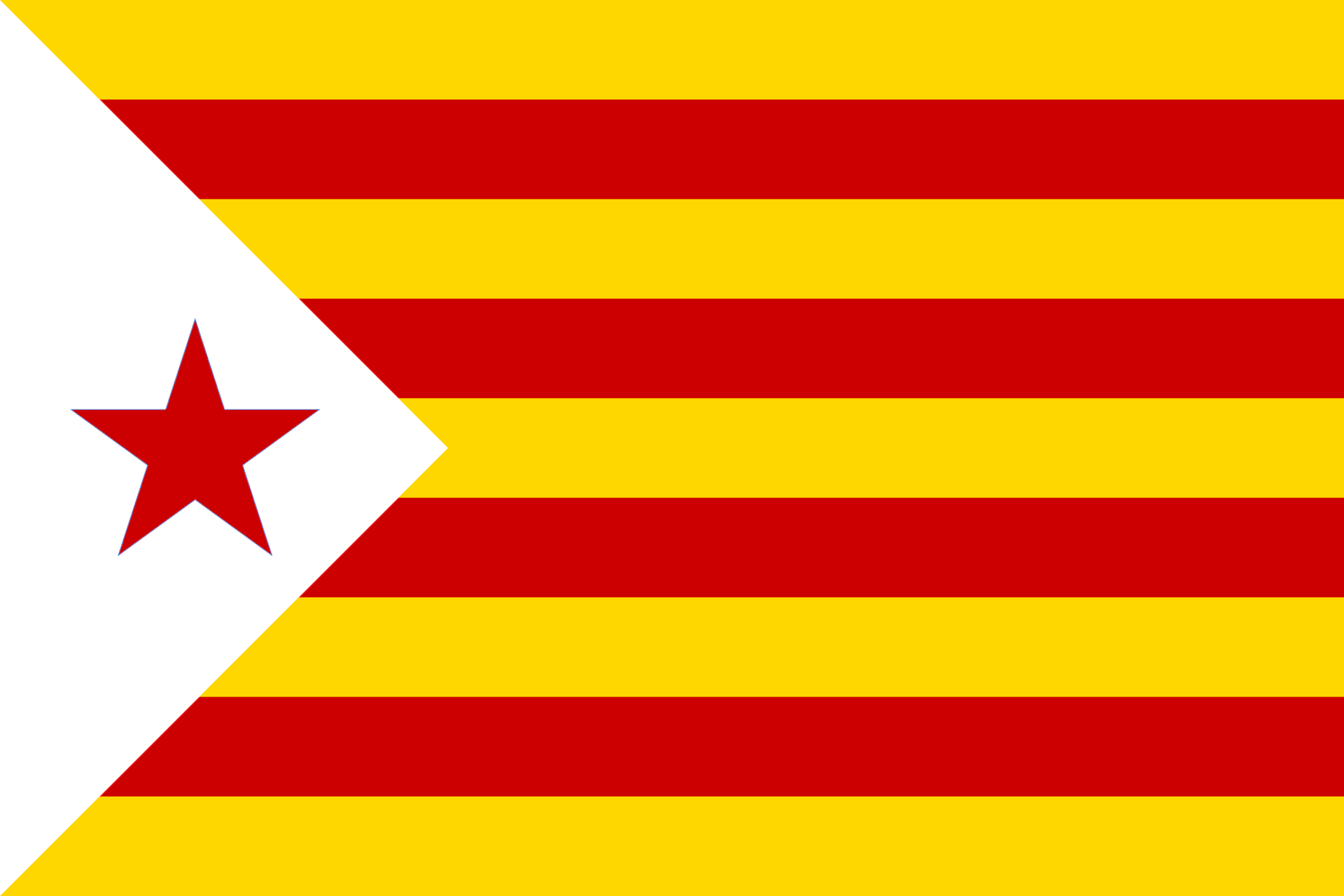
First flag used by the party, totally abandoned at the end of the 70s.

The PSAN also established some minimum points to negotiate with other parties: freedom of association, right to strike, the statute of Núria 1932, at least similar statutes to the Valencian Country and the Balearic Islands. The PSAN criticized the National Front of Catalonia (FNC) for being in the past and established a new organizational model:

- Bases d'Enquadrament, divided into fronts (students, union, education, comarques and neighborhoods) and a service of propaganda and education, which is in charge of publications, including the magazine, Lluita, published since August 1969.
- Assembly of representatives, the central committee of the party (15 to 20 members).
- Executive Board, responsible for policy direction, coordination of the party and the propaganda apparatus.

Its members at the time, between 50 and 100, were concentrated in Barcelona, Vallès Oriental, Vallès Occidental, Maresme, Lleida, the Tarragonès, the Terra Alta and the Gironès. The party had also contacts they had in Mallorca and València.

Since September 11, 1969 the PSAN participated in the placement of estelades, political graffiti and posters. Some members were arrested due to those actions. At the same time, in December 1969 they were invited to join the Council of Political Forces of Catalonia, but they refused because of the Burgeois and moderate character of this body.

In September 1970 the PSAN encouraged its members to join CCOO. They participated in the demonstrations on May 1, and attempteded to form a teachers union and maintained contacts with the Socialist Movement of Catalonia. Influenced by the Process of Burgos and the Basque armed group ETA, the party created a direct action section, to show solidarity with the Basque movement. The same year Socialist Independentist Action of Catalonia (ASIC), led by Fèlix Cucurull, a small group but with experienced militants. They also maintained contacts with Esquerra Catalana dels Treballadors (ECT), the Valencian Socialist Party (PSV), Germania Socialista and the Comité Rossellonès d'Estudis i d'Acció (CREA).

On January 16, 1971, the party called for a demonstration in Barcelona in solidarity with the people being tried in the Process of Burgos, with 200 participants. The PSAN also showed support to the Assembly of Catalonia, to avoid isolation and lose influence. Joan Josep Armet became the spokesman and intended to strengthen its popular and paraticipativo character and deepen its national character. In 1972 the party was in crisis because of its slow growth, especially in the unions, and some activists believed that changes were needed to energize the party. This critical members published, between 1972 and 1973, several magazines. In 1972 the youth section, Catalan Revolutionary Youth (JRC) was created. The PSAN also supported the militants of the Catalan Liberation Front (FAC), that were jailed or were being tried, but criticized the lack of serious political content in that organization.

After the Second Plenary Session of the Assembly of Catalonia in 1973, the PSAN politically confronted the PSUC and OCE-Bandera Roja, accusing them of being Spanish nationalists. The Catalan Revolutionary Youth and the PSAN had also at the time the first confrontations, since the youth group wanted a more frentist approach to organization. The insurrectionsm of some sectors also caused internal problems.

=== The split of the PSAN-Provisional ===
In March 1973 the PSAN suffered a split of a more radical group, including the majority of the Catalan Revolutionary Youth. This group considered that the PSAN had an excessively conciliatory stance towards the PSUC. The splitters formed the Socialist Party of National Liberation-Provisional in 1974. In August 1973, the PSAN establishes a cell in Prada de Conflent, in the French department of Pyrénées-Orientales and gained presence in the city of València in 1974, the party being joined by people that would become very important members in the future: Josep Guia, Gonçal Castelló or Manuel Tarín among them. In April 1975 the PSAN joined the Democratic Council of Valencia. In 1976 the party gained presence in the Balearic Islands.

In January 1976, the PSAN elected a new Central Committee, that adopted a new Political Declaration of Principles, which declared the party to be strictly Leninist. In the labor field in 1977, the party sponsored the Col·lectius de Treballadors, while the PSAN-Provisional did the same with the Col·lectius d'Obrers en Lluita, to enter the labor field.

In 1977 the party suffered a split from the moderate marxist current, that created the Catalan Liberation Collective. In the elections of 1977, the first democratic ones since 1936, the party created the Popular Unity Candidature for Socialism (CUPS), in coalition with the Marxist Unification Movement and the PSAN-P, that gained 12.040 votes (the 0.4% of the total in Catalonia). The party was legalised in 1978. The PSAN also supported the successful candidacy of Lluís Maria Xirinacs to the Spanish Senate. In elections of 1977 the PSAN created a new coalition with the Catalan Workers Bloc and independents, the Bloc d'Esquerra d'Alliberament Nacional (BEAN). BEAN gained 46,962 votes (1.59% of the total vote in Catalonia). In the local elections of the same year the party got 8,878 votes and 5 town councillors. In 1980 the party abandoned the coalition and suffered the split of Nacionalistes d'Esquerra (NE), the eurocommunist section of the party.

=== From the 80s to today ===
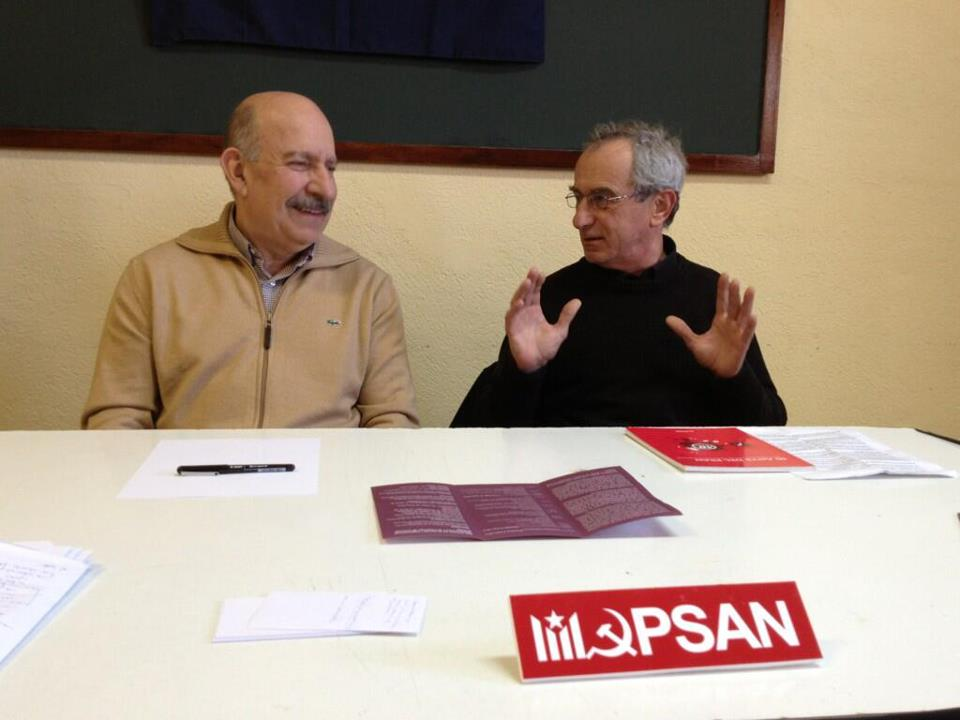
Josep Guia and Jordi Fornas in 2013.

After the split of NE, the PSAN radicalized, and in 1983 became the axis of the Moviment de Defensa de la Terra (MDT), created in 1984 thanks to the union with Independentists of the Catalan Countries (CPI), the successor organization PSAN-Provisional. However, in 1987 the MDT was divided and fragmented. The faction of the MDT close to the PSAN was the MDT-Patriotic Front (MDT-FP). In 1988 a new youth organization, Maulets was created. In 1989 the PSAN joined Catalunya Lliure, an electoral coalition formed by the National Front of Catalonia, the MDT-FP and Maulets. The adoption of independentism by Republican Left of Catalonia (ERC) at the end of that year left Catalunya Lliure in a difficult position, since a lot of its members joined ERC. The PSAN and Maulets were the only organizations left in Catalunya Lliure in 1993. The coalition was dissolved in 1996. Since then, the PSAN has been very isolated from the rest of the Catalan Independentist Left. Since 2010 the party supports Catalan Solidarity for Independence and joined the coalition in 2012.
