= Jordi Mestres i López =

Catalan chemical researcher and genealogist (born 1967)

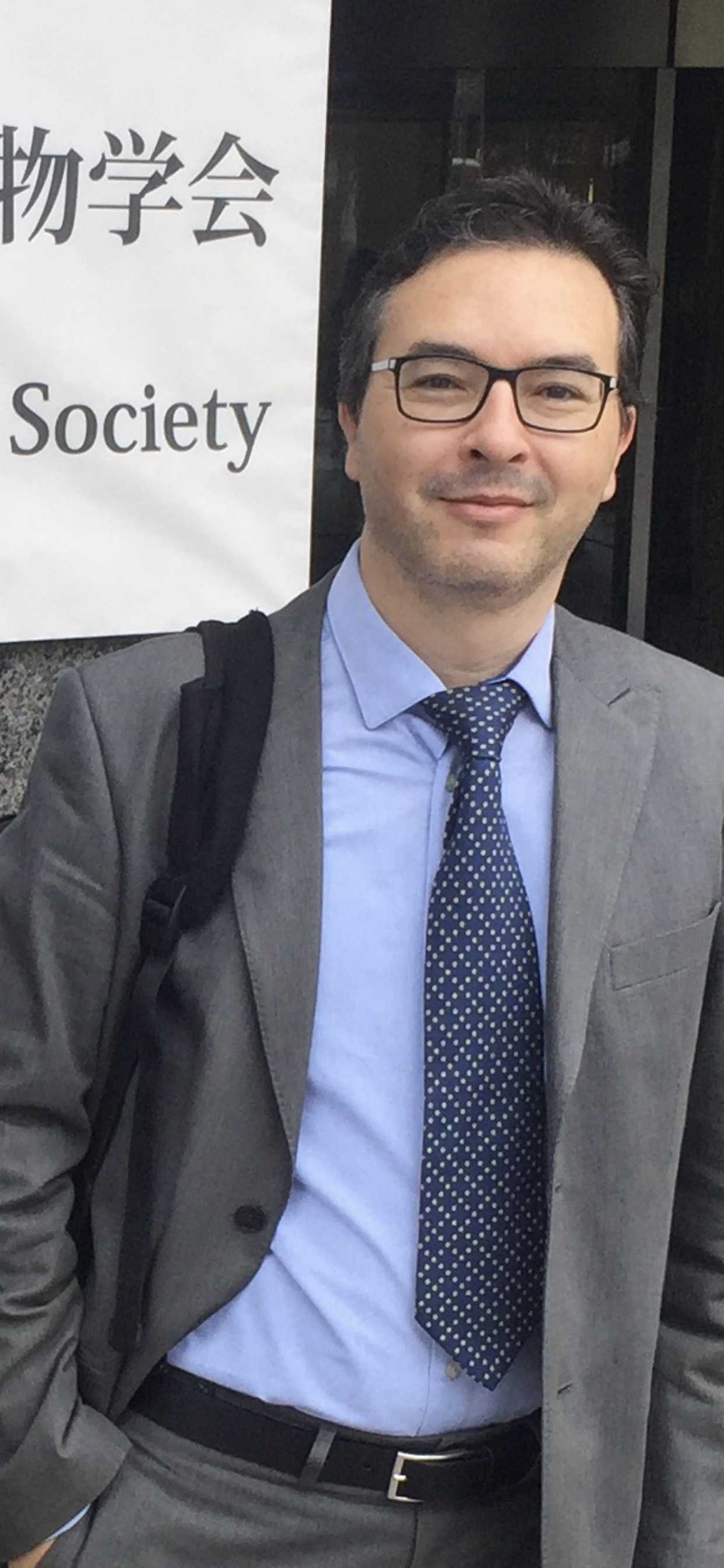
- Born: 1967 (age 58–59)

Jordi Mestres i López (born 1967, Girona) is a Catalan chemical researcher who works in the field of research for molecules of pharmacological interest. He is also an active researcher as a genealogist.

== Early life ==
Jordi Mestres was a student at Escolania de Montserrat (1977–1981). In 1990 he obtained a degree in chemistry from the Autonomous University of Barcelona (UAB) and in 1995 a doctorate in chemistry (computational chemistry) from the University of Girona (UdG), with short research stays at the Université de Paris-Sud (1992), Rice University (1993) and the pharmaceutical company Upjohn Co. ( Kalamazoo, United States; 1995).

== Research in chemistry ==
In parallel to his research in the field of quantum chemistry, he headed towards the computational design of drugs, with a post-doctoral stay at the company Pharmacia & Upjohn ( Kalamazoo, United States ).

In 1997 he joined NV Organon as a researcher ( Oss, Netherlands ) and three years later was appointed Director of Computational Medical Chemistry at Organon Laboratories (Newhouse, United Kingdom ). In 2003 he started the Chemiogenomics Research Group of the Municipal Institute of Medical Research (IMIM), where he has been a researcher until 2023. He has been an associate professor at Pompeu Fabra University (UPF).

In 2006 he founded the company Chemotargets SL, which has developed benchmark software in the field of pharmacology prediction and molecule safety, used, for example, by the American regulatory agency of the drug ( FDA ).

Between 2010 and 2016 he was editor of the journal Molecular Informatics.

== Research in genealogy ==
In the field of genealogy, Jordi Mestres has received training from Armand de Fluvià, he has a master's degree in nobility and prize law, heraldry and genealogy from the National University of Distance Education (UNED), under the direction of Jaime de Salazar, and is a member of the board of the Catalan Institute of Genealogy and Heraldry . His area of genealogical research focuses mainly on lineages from the Girona counties, but he has also investigated Asturian lineages. He has also worked in the field of genetic genealogy. He is the author of the book that collects the tree of sides, up to the sixth generation, of 100 protagonists in the history of Girona and the regions born between 1813 and 1927.

== Awards and honors ==
His research in drug design was recognized in 2006 with the international Corwin Hansch award given by the QSAR, Chemoinformatics and Modeling Society and more recently with his admission as a Fellow of the Royal Society of Chemistry. His company Chemotargets was awarded in 2007 by the Social Council of Pompeu Fabra University. In 2021, he was considered one of the eight most influential researchers in the Barcelona Biomedical Research Park (PRBB). He is chair of the organizing committee of the QSAR, Cheminformatics and Modeling Society's 24th European Symposium on Quantitative Structure-Activity Relationships in Barcelona in 2024. He is a member of the Scientific Advisory Board of ChemBioFrance and of the Chemical Abstracts Service.

== Work ==
- Mestres, Jordi (2007). Bibliografia sardanista 1850-2007 (in Catalan). [Girona]: Diputació de Girona : Generalitat de Catalunya, Departament de Cultura, Centre de Promoció de la Cultura Popular i Tradicional Catalana. ISBN 978-84-611-7179-8. OCLC 804486410.
- Mestres, Jordi (2022). Genealogies gironines : els orígens de protagonistes de la història de Girona i comarques (in Catalan). [Girona]: Ajuntament de Girona Diputació de Girona Difusió, Publicacions i Videos. ISBN 978-84-125247-2-7. OCLC 1389892026.
- Mestres, Jordi (2023). Meana - Origen y expansión de un linaje asturiano (s. XV-XX) (in Spanish). [Oviedo]: Editorial Publicaciones. ISBN 978-84-125561-7-9.
- Montserrat (Monestir). (1981). Música a Montserrat 1881-1981 (in Latin). Madrid: CBS. OCLC 803823840.
- Montserrat (Monestir). (1981). Cançons populars catalanes (in Catalan). Madrid: CBS. OCLC 807893015.
