= Platform for the Unity of Action =

Platform for the Unity of Action Plataforma per la Unitat d'Acció
- Founded: 1995
- Dissolved: 2000
- Merger of: People's Unity Assembly; Members of Maulets and Catalunya Lliure
- Merged into: Endavant
- Headquarters: Barcelona
- Ideology: Catalan independence Socialism; Anti-fascism; Libertarian socialism Autonomism
- Political position: Left-wing
- Colors: Red; Yellow; Black

The Platform for the Unity of Action (Catalan: Plataforma per la Unitat d'Acció, PUA) was an independentist organisation active between 1995 and 2000. The PUA was created by ex-members of People's Unity Assembly, the Maulets, different local political organisations and Catalunya Lliure. One of the main reasons the PUA was formed was to oppose the approaching of a sector of the Catalan independentist left to the Republican Left of Catalonia (ERC).

The following years the PUA experienced a big growth, based on local groups, formed mostly by young people, and participated in the social movements of the late 90s, like the movement against temporary employment or the Okupa (political squatting movement).

In 2000 the organisation considered that its organisational model was becoming obsolete, and that there was a need of establishing more solid and appropriate organisational structures. Therefore, in June 2000, the PUA dissolved itself and formed Endavant.
