= Brest Charter =

Western European political manifesto

Brest Charter sticker

The Brest Charter was a document signed by several European far-left separatist groups in February 1974, in Brest, Brittany, France. The Charter advocated for a Europe of independent socialist states and affirmed “the right of the oppressed people to respond to counter-revolutionary violence with revolutionary violence.” The initial signatories were the Official branch of the Irish Republican Movement (represented by Eoin Ó Murchú), the Breton Democratic Union (UDB), and the Galician People's Union (UPG). Herriko Alderdi Sozialista signed the charter a few weeks later.

Other signatories included Cymru Goch, Socialist Party of National Liberation – Provisional, Catalan Workers Left, Su Populu Sardu, and Occitan Struggle.

At the time, the Charter attracted little attention within the Official Republican Movement, which was more focused on establishing links with the Soviet Union.

The Charter was reaffirmed at a gathering in San Sebastián in November 1977. The Official Republican Movement, which was moving away from armed struggle, did not send a representative to a follow-up meeting in 1978.

== Sources ==
- Cullen, Niall. Radical Basque Nationalist-Irish Republican Relations. Routledge, 2023.
