= Assassination of Guillem Agulló =

1993 murder of Valencian activist

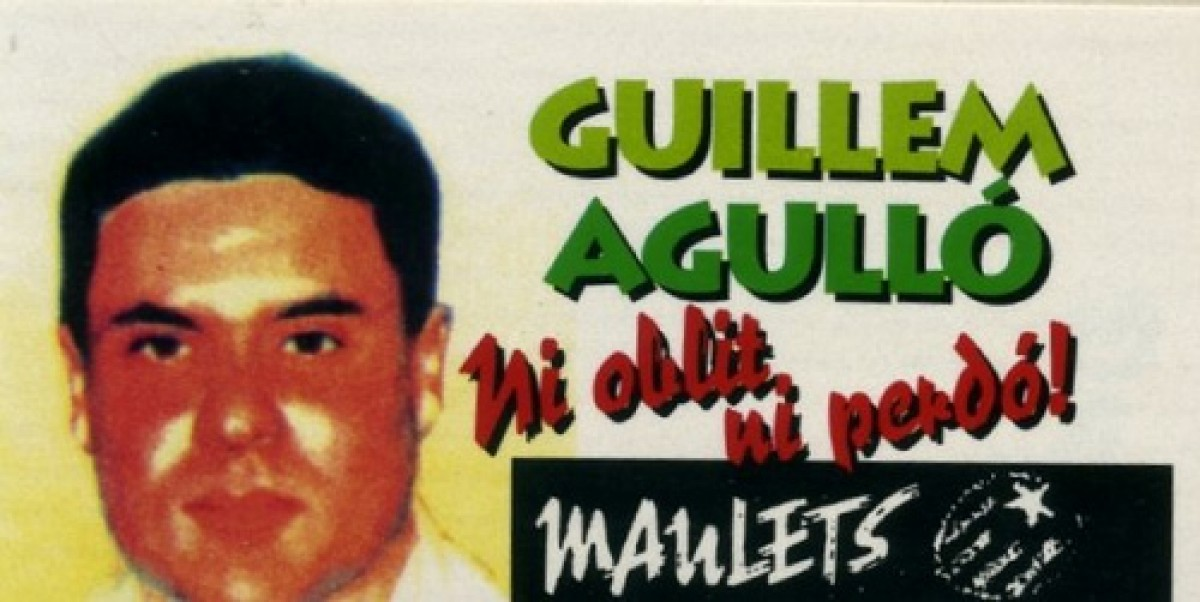
Sticker of Maulets, the anti-fascist organization to which Agulló belonged, showing the popular slogan "Guillem Agulló, ni oblit, ni perdó".

Guillem Agulló i Salvador (6 September 1974 in Burjassot, Valencia – 11 April 1993 in Montanejos, Castelló) was a Valencian anti-fascist and pro-Catalan independence young activist who was assassinated on 11 April 1993, by the Spanish neo-Nazi Pedro Cuevas, in Montanejos. His assassination is a famous case in the Catalan-speaking countries, where Agulló has become a symbol of anti-fascism and anti-racism. The slogan "Guillem Agulló, ni oblit, ni perdó" (Catalan for 'Guillem Agulló, not forgotten, no forgiveness') has become a popular anti-fascist slogan.

== Attack ==
On the morning of 11 April 1993, Guillem Agulló, member of the leftist and pro-independence organization Maulets and of Skinheads Against Racial Prejudice (SHARP), travelled to Montanejos alongside some friends, when they were attacked by a group of young fascists shouting "Sieg Heil" and "Viva España" and one of them stabbed him in the heart, causing his death. The attackers left singing the Spanish fascist anthem "Cara al Sol". The assassination was perpetrated by the fascist group "Komando Marchalenes IV Reich", named in honor of the Nazi regime, which was composed of Pedro Cuevas (the material perpetrator of the assassination), Gerardo Mora, Juan Manuel Sánchez, José Cuñat, and Francisco Garcia.

Family members and left-wing and pro-independence organizations denounced that the motive for the crime had been political, since the young people who were involved in the murder were known for their Spanish and fascist ideology and also were aware of the anti-fascist ideology of Agulló.

== Trial ==
The 1995 trial, held in Castelló de la Plana, was contentious and generated considerable controversy in the media. Throughout the proceedings, the conservative press, led by the Valencian newspaper Las Provincias under its Blaverist editor María Consuelo Reyna, ran several campaigns that sought to criminalize the victim and the anti-fascist and pro-independence groups Guillem belonged to.

In a heavily criticized decision, the judge rejected accusations of political assassination, stating that it was a "fight between youngsters". The only convicted person was Cuevas, who was sentenced to 14 years in prison. The other members were acquitted. Cuevas was released after 4 years for "good conduct".

== After the trial ==
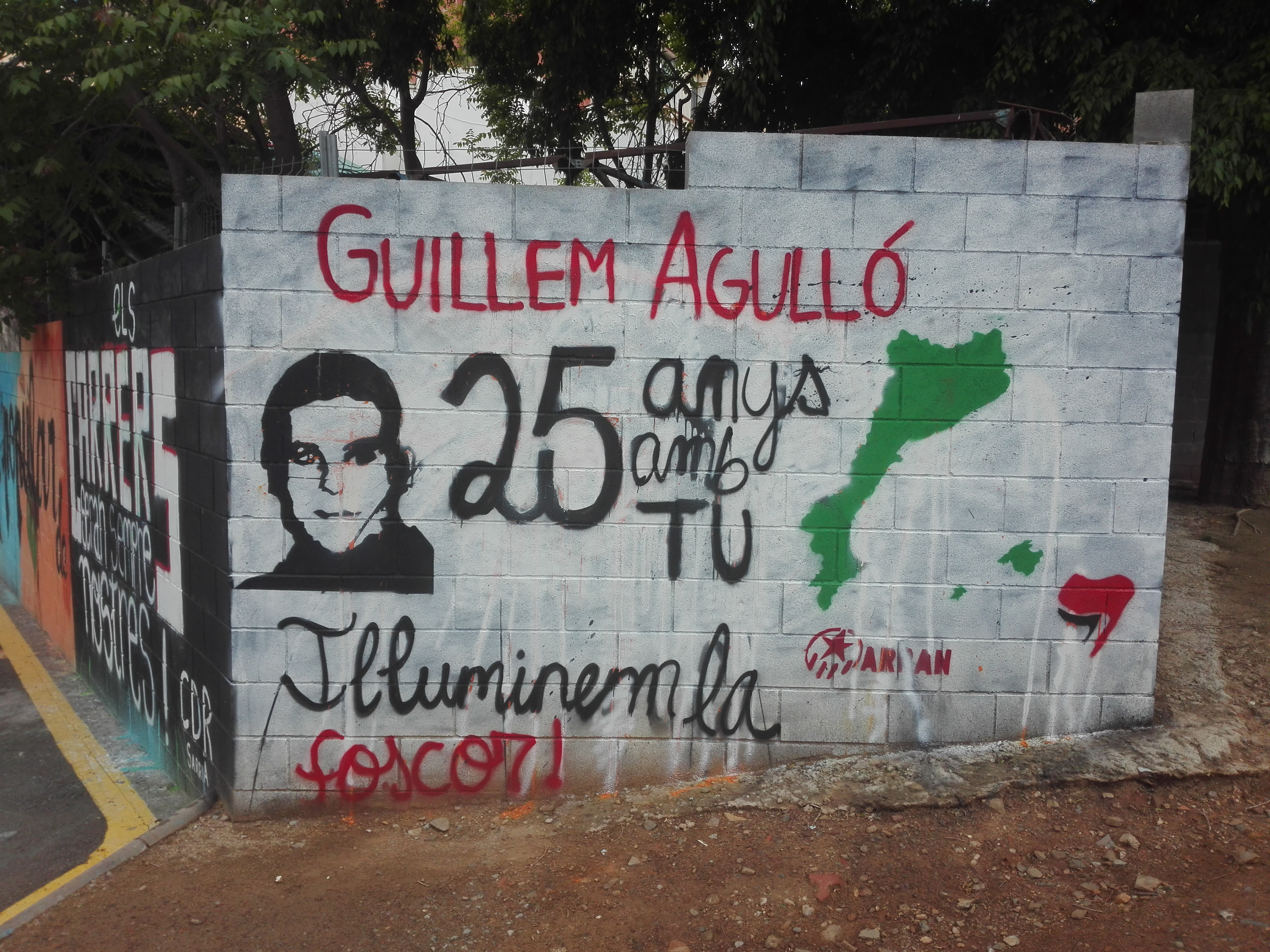
Mural by the youth revolutionary organization Arran (successor of Maulets) in Sarrià, Barcelona, commemorating the 25 year anniversary of the assassination of Guillem Agulló

In 2005, Cuevas was arrested during "Operación Panzer" for being a member of the neo-Nazism group Frente Antisistema (FAS). The Guardia Civil found 40 bracelets with Nazi swastikas, one knife with Nazi symbols, and brass knuckles.

In 2007, Pedro Cuevas was ran for the municipal elections for Alianza Nacional (a far-right party) in Chiva, in which he won only 23 votes.

== Legacy and political significance ==
Guillem Agulló has become a symbol of anti-fascism and anti-racism in the Catalan Countries. Multiple homages have been held and several demonstrations commemorate the anniversaries of his assassination. Several streets have been named after him: in Vic, Barcelona, Valencia, Vilassar de Dalt and Burjassot. The Corts Valencianes created the Guillem Agulló Prize to commemorate «the prominent people and initiatives in the fight against xenophobia, racism, and hate crimes». In 2019 the Senate of Spain approved the creation of the Guillem Agulló fund to help the families of victims of hate crimes.

== See also ==
- Murder of Carlos Palomino
- Anti-Catalan sentiment
- Battle of Valencia
