= Miquel Mayol i Raynal =

Spanish politician

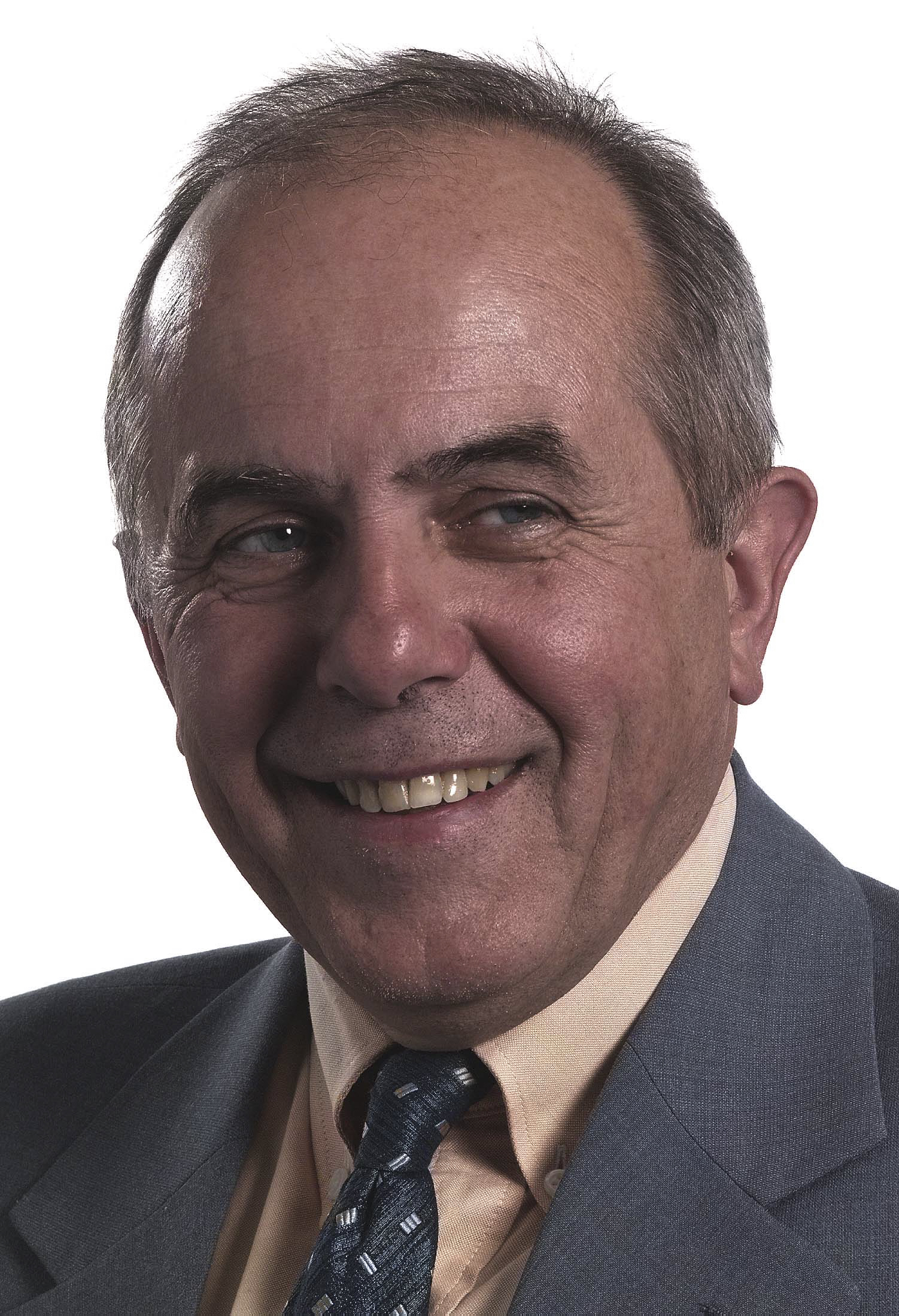

Member of European Parliament
- In office 8 June 2001 – 19 July 2004
- Constituency: Spain

Personal details
- Born: August 11, 1941 (age 85) Perpignan, Pyrénées-Orientales, France
- Party: Republican Left of Catalonia; Catalan Workers' Left

Miquel Mayol i Raynal (born 11 August 1941) is a Spanish politician of French nationality who served as a Member of the European Parliament from 2001 to 2004 in Spanish lists.

== Biography ==
Born in Perpignan, he taught law and was a founder of Catalan Workers' Left,. He later joined the Republican Left of Catalonia and was the secretary of their North Catalonia division.

In June 2001 he became a RLC member of the European Parliament in the Greens–European Free Alliance. He sat in the European Parliament until July 2004.

He was also an activist in promoting both the Catalan language and its culture., and was awarded the 2014 Joan Blanca Prize alongside Carme Forcadell i Lluís.
