= Armand de Fluvià =

Catalan genealogist and heraldist (1931–2024)

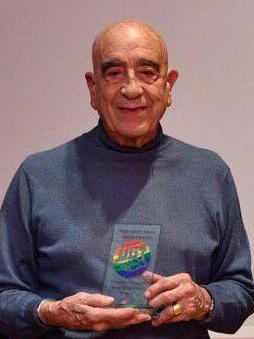
- De Fluvià in 2019
- Born: Armand de Fluvià i Escorsa; 17 October 1931; Barcelona, Catalonia, Spain
- Died: 6 September 2024 (aged 92)
- Education: University of Barcelona
- Occupations: Genealogist, heraldist

Armand de Fluvià i Escorsa (17 October 1931 – 6 September 2024) was a Catalan genealogist and heraldist. He specialized in Catalan genealogies and in the dynasties of the counts of the Catalan Countries. He had also been a pioneer of the gay rights movement since the last years of the Francoist dictatorship. He was one of the founders of Nacionalistes d'Esquerra (Left Nationalists).

== Early life ==
Armand de Fluvià i Escorsa was born in Barcelona, Spain on 17 October 1931, the son of Armand de Fluvià i Vendrell. In 1959, he graduated with a law degree from the University of Barcelona. In 1960 he became a member of the Barcelona Bar Association.

== Career ==
After finishing a course in paleography and diplomatics in the Faculty of Philosophy and Arts of the University of Barcelona, de Fluvià became involved in genealogy and heraldry. He was a member of the International Institute of Genealogy and Heraldry and of the Salazar y Castro Institute of the CSIC.

In 1984, de Fluvià received the Arenberg Prize in genealogy (1984) and since 1985, he was a member of the Académie Internationale d'Héraldique (International Academy of Heraldry). He was founder and president (1983–2007) of the Societat Catalana de Genealogia, Heràldica, Sigil·lografia, Vexil·lologia i Nobiliària (Catalan Society of Genalogy, Heraldry, Sigillography, Vexillology, and Nobility). He was also a member of the Institut d'Estudis Gironins (Institute of Studies about Girona) (1967) and a numerary member of the Institut d'Estudis Empordanesos (Institute of Studies about the Empordà (1967–93), consultant of the Arxiu Històric de la Ciutat de Barcelona (Historical Archive of the City of Barcelona) (1983) and of the National Archive of Catalonia (1983).

In 1996, de Fluvià gave his bibliographic and documentary collection to the Generalitat de Catalunya (Catalan regional government). At the time, he opposed the change of heraldry symbols that had been approved by the Ajuntament de Barcelona (Barcelona City Hall). In 2000, he was awarded the Creu de Sant Jordi and in 2008 received the Golden Medal of Barcelona.

On 24 October 2007, he founded the Institució Catalana de Genealogia i Heràldica (Catalan Institution of Genealogy and Heraldry) (ICGenHer) being the chairperson until he died in 2024.

=== Activist ===
In 1953, de Fluvià was a member of the monarchical group Joventut Espanyola d'Acció (Spanish Youth of Action) (JEA). In 1957, he was imprisoned for political activism. He took part in the Caputxinada and until 1969, he was a member of the political secretary's office of Infante Juan, Count of Barcelona. He later became involved in Catalan separatist movement and the defence of gay rights.

In 1976, he became a member of the Socialist Convergence of Catalonia (CSC), which he abandoned in 1979 in order to become one of the founders of Nacionalistes d'Esquerra (Leftist Nationalists) (Nd'E) and, in 1985, of its splinter group, Moviment d'Esquerra Nacionalista (Leftist Nationalist Movement) (MEN). From 1981 to 1993, he was an active member of the Crida a la Solidaritat (Call to Solidarity).

In 1970, when homosexuality was still illegal in Spain, de Fluvià founded the Spanish Movement of Homosexual Liberation. In 1974, he taught a course on sexual anthropology at the Universitat Catalana d'Estiu (Summer Catalan University). He founded and became the first leader of the Front d'Alliberament Gai de Catalunya (Gay Liberation Front of Catalonia) and was president of the Lambda Institute.

== Death ==
De Fluvià died of respiratory failure on 6 September 2024, at the age of 92.

== Works ==
- Pacte de Joia (1974). (in Catalan)
- Diccionari general d'heràldica (1982). (in Catalan)
- Els Primitius Comtats i Vescomtats de Catalunya (1989). (in Catalan)
- Els quatre pals, l'escut dels comtes de Barcelona (1994). (in Catalan)
- A la recerca dels avantpassats (1995). (in Catalan)
- Repertori de grandeses, títols i corporacions nobiliàries de Catalunya (1998). (in Catalan)
- El moviment gai a la clandestinitat del franquisme (1970–75) (2003). (in Catalan)
- Repertori de grandeses, títols i corporacions nobiliàries de Catalunya II (2004). (in Catalan)
- L'apropiació dels Símbols Nacionals de Catalunya per part d'historiadors aragonesos (2009). (in Catalan)
- Catalunya, un país sense escut (2010). (in Catalan)
- Historia de una falsificación Nobiliaria: La Baronia de Gavín en Aragón (2010). (in Spanish)
- Manual d'heràldica i tècnica del blasó (2011). (in Catalan)
- Qui eren els meus avantpassats? Nou manual de genealogia (2012). (in Catalan)
- Manual de Nobiliària Catalana (2012). (in Catalan)
- Nobiliari General Català. Volum V (2014). (in Catalan)

== Document collection ==
His personal document collection is preserved in the National Archive of Catalonia.

His collection contains all the documents that Armand de Fluvià has produced or received along his life:

- Family and personal documents (cards, agendas and notes).
- Professional documents and work materials that are linked with his activities as a genealogist and heraldist, family trees, photos of world royal houses and of families of Catalan nobility.
- Archives of the marquis de la Cuesta.
- Documents linked with the Political Secretary of Infante Juan, Count of Barcelona in Catalonia (circulars, correspondence and invoices) with societies that defended the "monarchic rights" (letters, circulars, press excerpts about royal families and about the counts of Barcelona);
- Documents about the society Amigos de los Castillos (Friends of the castles) (statutes, correspondence, reports and acts);
- Documents about Carlism (programs, communiqués and correspondence).
- Documents in favour of gay rights.

The collection includes monographies and regular publications about genealogy, heraldry, monarchy, nobility and history.
