= Catalunya Lliure =

Spanish electoral coalition (1989-1996)

Catalunya Lliure Free Catalonia
- Founded: 1989
- Dissolved: 1996
- Merger of: PSAN; FNC; Maulets; MDT (MDT-Patriotic Front faction only)
- Headquarters: Barcelona
- Youth wing: Maulets
- Ideology: Catalan independence Socialism
- Political position: Left-wing
- Colors: Red; Yellow

Catalunya Lliure (Catalan: Free Catalonia) was an independentist organisation active between 1995 and 2000. Catalunya Lliure was created as a coalition between the PSAN, the National Front of Catalonia (FNC), Maulets and the MDT-Patriotic Front (the other faction of the MDT, the MDT-Independentists of the Catalan Countries refused to take part in the coalition). 8

== History ==
The coalition took part in the European elections of that year, getting 19,774 votes. In December of the same year the coalition became a political party.

This party represented the Patriotic Front strategy, with a strong social content, that the MDT-Patriotic Front defended at the time. On 14 April 1991, the National Council of Catalunya Lliure approved a draft for a future Catalan Constitution in Vinaròs.

In 1991, some members of Catalunya Lliure joined the Republican Left of Catalonia (ERC), and the FNC also decided to dissolve itself, and join the republican party. From that moment Catalunya Lliure started to have a more social discourse, to "defend the interests of the Catalan working people". The organisation would continue with certain presence in the streets until its dissolution in late 1996, shortly after both the PSAN and Maulets had left the party due to internal disputes.
