= Committees for the Defense of the Republic =

- Comitès de Defensa de la República
- Founded: 2017
- Country: Catalonia
- Ideology: Catalan independence; Republicanism; Factions: Socialism

The Committees for the Defence of the Republic (Catalan: Comitès de Defensa de la República), or CDR, previously named Committees for the Defense of the Referendum, are a network of committees that function on a local, regional and national level in Catalonia. Its initial purpose was to facilitate the Catalan independence referendum. After the referendum, they adopted the new objective to fight for the Catalan Republic, and publicly called for nonviolent protests and civil disobedience. The Committees for the Defense of the Republic have also organized sit-ins, blocking railway lines and the Barcelona–El Prat Josep Tarradellas Airport.

The CDR was created in September 2017 as voluntary groups founded by a diverse collective of popular associations. Their initial goal was to collaborate with the implementation of the Catalan independence referendum (1-O) which had been suspended by the Spanish Constitutional Court. After the referendum, the Committees promoted demonstrations against the Spanish police and organized several actions during the general strike of October 2017.

On June 17 2021, Spanish Guardia Civil (National Guard) concluded an investigation that defined the CDR as a "criminal organisation with terrorist purposes [and] capacity of assault, occupation and seize of institutional Catalan buildings and infrastructures."

== Arrests ==
On September 23 2019, the Civil Guard arrested 9 members of the CDR in Barcelona. The members had been monitored for more than a year under Operación Judas, and were arrested on terrorism and possession of explosives charges. The charge claimed that the group planned attacks as a result of the Trial of Catalonia independence leaders, and 7 were ultimately charged with belonging to a terrorist group, manufacturing and possessing firearm, and conspiracy to cause criminal damage.
