= ICGenHer =

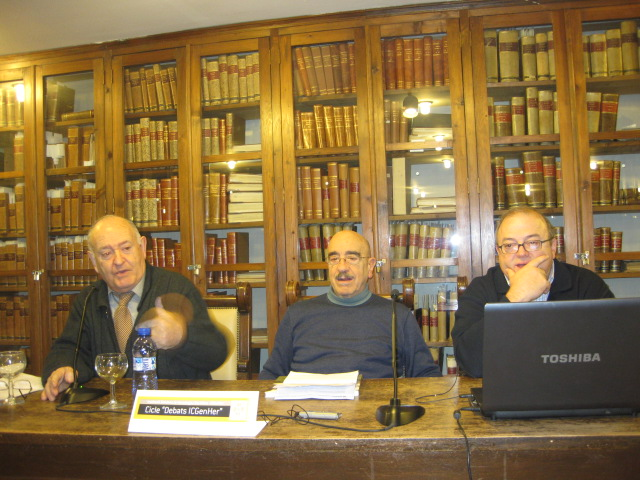
- Antoni Pladevall, Armand de Fluvià and Esteve Canyameres during an ICGenHer debate on genealogy at the Ateneu Barcelonès.

The ICGenHer or Catalan Institute of Genealogy and Heraldry is a research institution and publishing house specialized in genealogy, heraldry, nobility, family and genealogical documentation and palaeography. It also organizes courses on these topics. It was founded on October 24, 2007 by the current president, Armand de Fluvià i Escorsa. Publishes the magazine Armoria. Since October 2018, the organization has been a member of the Confédération Internationale de Généalogie et d'Héraldique, with correspondents all over the world, in which it actively participates.

As a publisher, the institution has published works by Armand de Fluvià i Escorsa, Antoni Pladevall i Font, Ignasi Ametlla, Jordi Mestres i López, Esteve Canyameres, Francesc Albardaner i Llorens and others. One of the major successes is the manual Who Were My Ancestors?: New Handbook of Genealogy (2009).

== Published literature ==
=== Books ===
- Armand de Fluvià i Escorsa; Antoni Pladevall and Font; Ignasi Ametlla and Guxens, Who were my ancestors?: new handbook of genealogy. (2009)
- Antoni Pladevall i Font; Esteve Canyameres and Ramoneda, Genealogy as a popular culture of its connection to the land, to the house, to the profession (2010)
- Armand de Fluvià i Escorsa, Manual of heraldry and blazon technique, co-published with Editorial Galerada (2011)
- Armand de Fluvià i Escorsa, Manual of Catalan nobility (2012)
- Francesc Albardaner and Llorens, The Catalanity of Columbus: historical science or patriotic fanaticism (2013)
- Javier de Cruïlles de Peratallada, Heraldry of the Cruïlles de Peratallada archive (2013)
- Armand de Fluvià and Escorsa; Pedro Moreno and Meyerhoff, Collection of articles: nobility and royalty: 1958-2015. (2015)
- Armand de Fluvià and Escorsa; Josep Maria Salrach and Marès; Francesc Cabana i Vancells, Catalan General Nobiliary (2016)
- Armand de Fluvià i Escorsa, Collection of articles 1958-2015. Nobility and Royalty (2016)
- Pedro Moreno and Meyerhoff, Genealogical History of the House of Híjar (2018)

=== Booklets ===
- The appropriation of the National Symbols of Catalonia by Aragonese historians (18 pages) (2009)
- Catalonia, a country without a shield (16 pages) (2010)
- History of a noble forgery: The Barony of Gavín in Aragon (40 pages) (2010), (castilian)
- Margarit lineage, from the 14th to the 19th century and that of all related lineages (24 pages) (2010)
- Armand de Fluvià i Escorsa; Gerard Marí i Brull (2010). Els falsaris i les falsificacions nobiliàries: la necessitat de formar part d'una elit o d'un grup social. p. 26.
