= Intersindical Región Murciana =

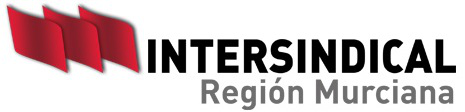
- Abbreviation: IntersindicalRM
- Founded: 2002
- Headquarters: Ronda de Garay, 16 - 1ºB 30003 Murcia
- Location: Spain
- Website: https://intersindicalrm.org/

Intersindical Región Murciana is a union in the Region of Murcia, Spain that brings together workers from the fields of education, public services and rail.

It was formed as a federation of unions in 2002 from the confluence of two unions: Sterm (Union of Education Workers of the Murcia Region belonging to the Confederation of Teachers' Unions and Intersindical Servicios Publicos (Union of workers of the public services of the Murcia Region), later incorporating the territorial organization of the Rail Union - Intersindical in the Murcia Region.

== Implantation ==
In the period 2016 - 2018 Intersindical Región Murciana had a 14% union representation in the administration of the Autonomous Community of the Region of Murcia. Currently (2019) has 18 union delegates.
