= Josep Guia =

Spanish writer, mathematics professor and activist

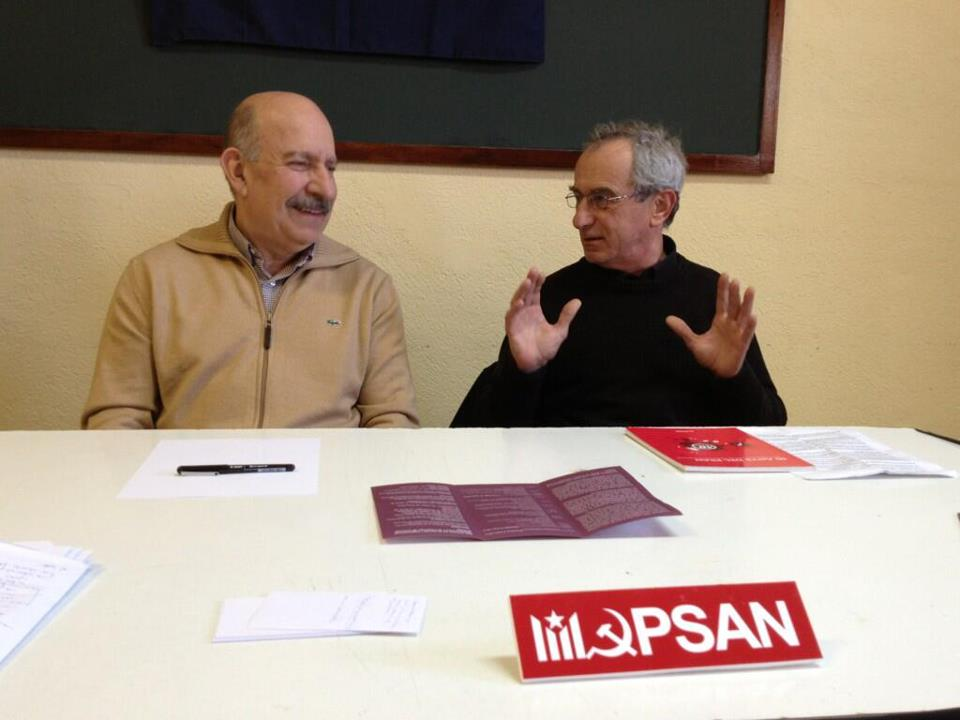
Josep Guia (left) and Jordi Fornas in 2013

Josep Guia i Marín (Valencian pronunciation: [dʒuˈzɛb ˈɡi.a]; born 1947, in Valencia) is a Spanish writer, mathematics professor of University of Valencia and political activist within PSAN party. In 1986, he was awarded by Fundació Jaume I.

Some of his most relevant essays about Catalan nationalism are: Països Catalans i Llibertat ("Catalan Countries and Freedom) (1983), És molt senzill, digueu-li Catalunya ("It's very easy, call it Catalonia") (1985), Des de la Catalunya del Sud ("From Southern Catalonia") (1987), València, 750 anys de nació catalana (Valencia, 750 years of Catalan Nation) (1988) and Catalunya descoberta ("Catalonia, discovered") (1990). He is an editor of Lluita magazine.
