= Burjassot =

Burjassot Burjasot
- Town and municipality
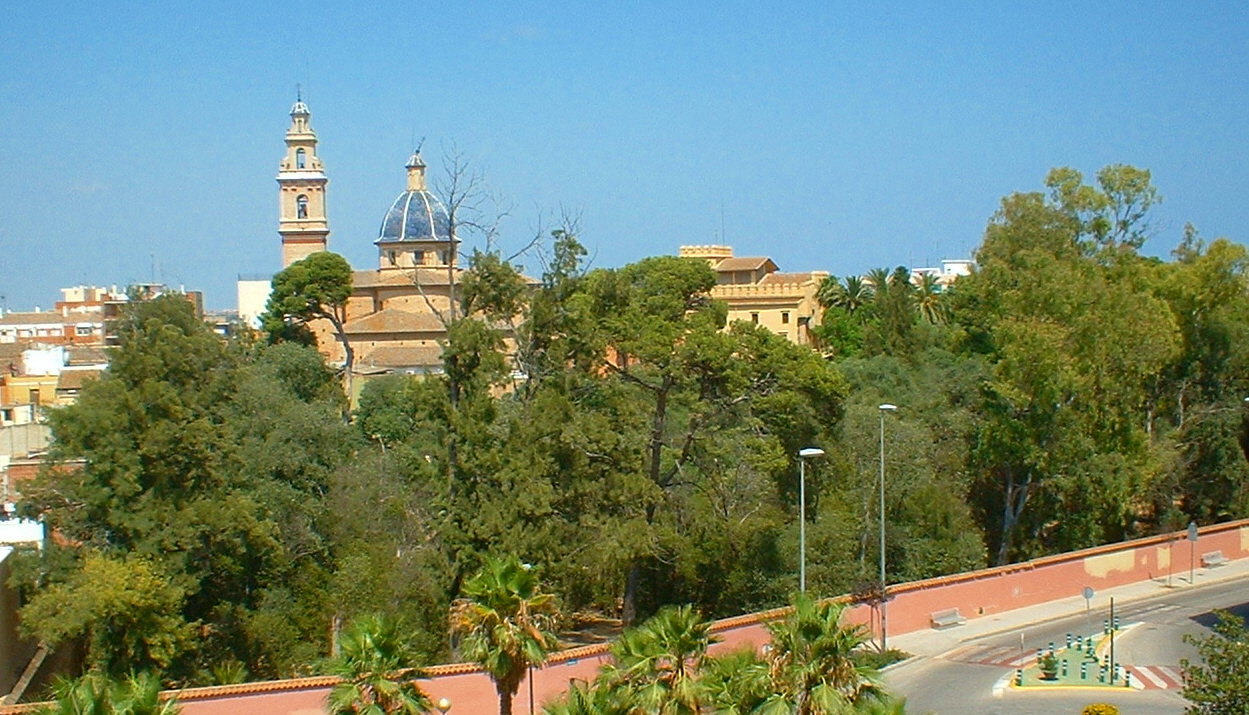

- Coat of arms

- Location in Spain Burjassot (Valencian Community) Burjassot (Spain)
- Coordinates: 39°30′23″N 0°24′24″W
- Country: Spain
- Autonomous community: Valencian Community
- Province: Valencia
- Comarca: Horta Nord
- Judicial district: Paterna

Government
  - Alcalde (Mayor): Rafael García García (2015) (PSPV-PSOE)

Area
  - Total: 3.4 km^{2} (1.3 sq mi)
- Elevation: 59 m (194 ft)

Population (2025-01-01)
  - Total: 41,299
  - Density: 12,000/km^{2} (31,000/sq mi)
- Demonyms: • burjassoter, -a (Val.) • burjasotense (Sp.)
- Official language(s): Valencian; Spanish
- Linguistic area: Valencian
- Time zone: UTC+1 (CET)
  - Summer (DST): UTC+2 (CEST)
- Postal code: 46100
- Website: Official website

Burjassot, (Note: Pronunciation of Burjassot: Valencian: [buɾdʒaˈsɔt]) in Valencian, spelled Burjasot in Spanish, (Note: Pronunciation of Burjasot (unofficial): Spanish: [buɾxaˈsot]) is a town and municipality in the comarca of Horta Nord in the Valencian Community, Spain.

== Museums ==
The Museum of Geology at the University of Valencia is located on carrer Doctor Moliner. It has several collections of geological and paleontological materials such as meteorites and fossils. There are also other items of historical value. In 1996, it was recognized by the Concierge Museum of Culture of the Ministry of Culture of the Generalitat Valenciana. It is developing an important role in conservation.

== Notable people ==
- Guillem Agulló i Salvador, Valencian anti-fascist
- Sergio Ballesteros, former footballer
- Miguel Alfonso Herrero, footballer

== See also ==
- List of municipalities in Valencia
