= Jordi Carbonell =

Catalan politician (1924–2016)

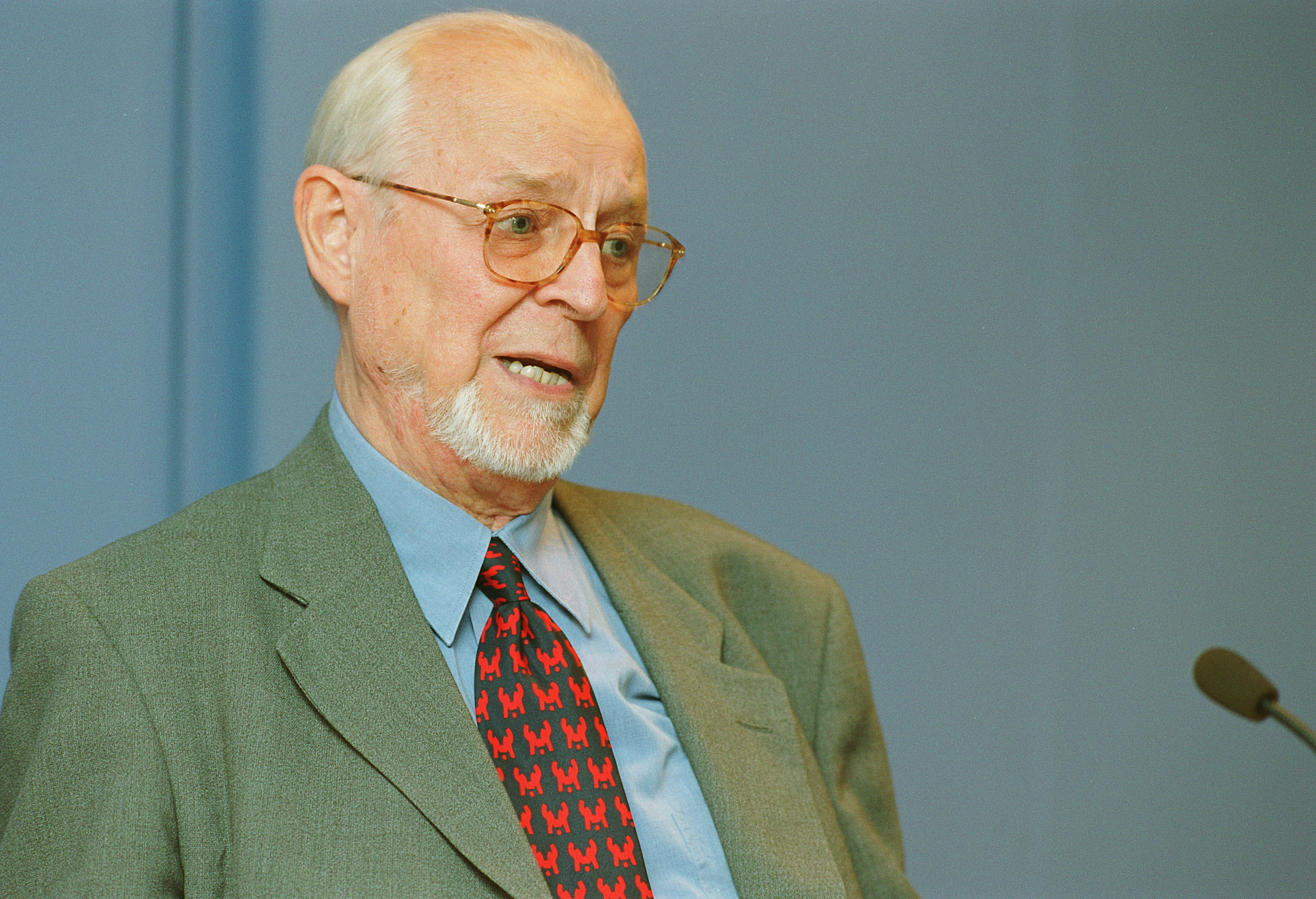
Carbonell in 2001

Jordi Carbonell i de Ballester (Catalan pronunciation: [ˈʒɔɾði kəɾβuˈneʎ]; 23 April 1924 – 22 August 2016) was a Spanish politician from Catalonia.

A graduate in Romance philology from the University of Barcelona, Carbonell was a professor in Catalan Language at the Autonomous University of Barcelona, from which he was expelled in 1972 for political reasons. He was a professor at the University of Cagliari (Casteddu, Sardinia) and a lecturer in Catalan at the University of Liverpool.

A founding member of the Society for Catalan Historical Studies (Societat Catalana d’Estudis Històrics), a branch of the Institute for Catalan Studies (Institut d'Estudis Catalans), he directed the Great Catalan Encyclopaedia from 1965 to 1971.

He participated in several initiatives to oppose the Francoist State, such as the Assembly of Catalonia (Assemblea de Catalunya), and was a founder of the left-wing Catalan nationalist movement, Nacionalistes d’Esquerra. From 1996 to July 2004, he was the President of Esquerra Republicana de Catalunya, and later held the post of Honorary President, following his having been succeeded in the active political position by Josep-Lluís Carod-Rovira.

Party political offices
Preceded by Jaume Campabadal	President of ERC; 1996 – 2004	Succeeded by Josep-Lluís Carod-Rovira
