= Catalan Workers' Left =

Catalan Workers' Left Esquerra Catalana dels Treballadors
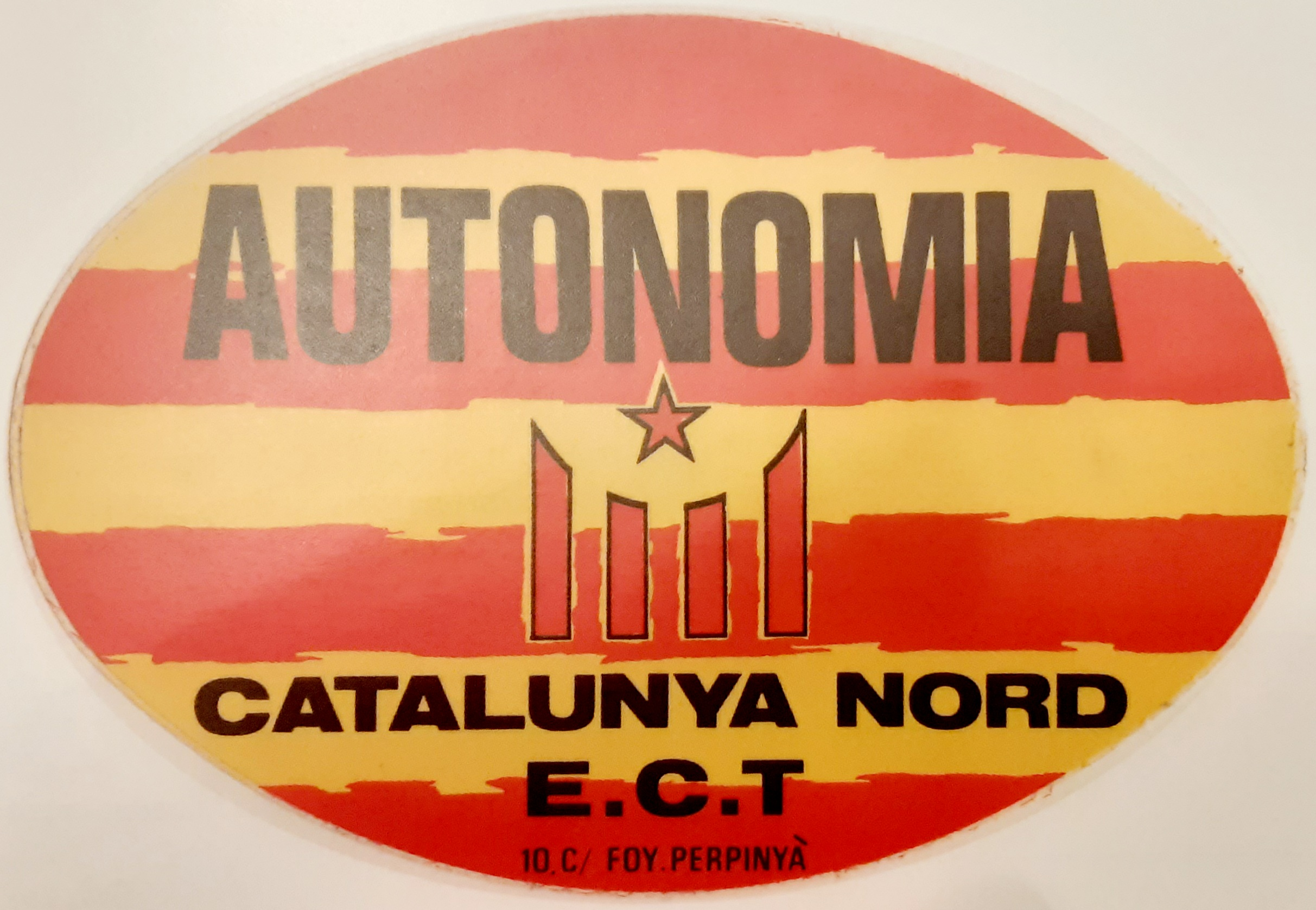
- Secretary-General: Miquel Mayol i Raynal
- Founded: 1972
- Dissolved: 1981
- Newspaper: La Falç
- Ideology: Revolutionary Socialism; Catalan nationalism Left-wing nationalism Maoism
- Colors: Red; Yellow

Party flag

Catalan Workers' Left (in Catalan: Esquerra Catalana dels Treballadors) was a political party in Northern Catalonia, France. ECT was formed in 1972, with its main base in Perpignan.

ECT was linked to the Socialist Party of National Liberation (PSAN). In 1977 a group, linked to the Socialist Party of National Liberation - Provisional (PSAN-p), broke away from ECT and formed the Socialist Organisation of National Liberation (OSAN).

The newspaper of the organization was La Nova Falç.

ECT was dissolved in 1981, but many of its cadres continued to work in other political outfits, like Catalan Unity (UC).
