= National Archive of Catalonia =

Body that holds documents related to Catalonia society, politics, economics and history

Coordinates: 41.4656°N 2.0692°E

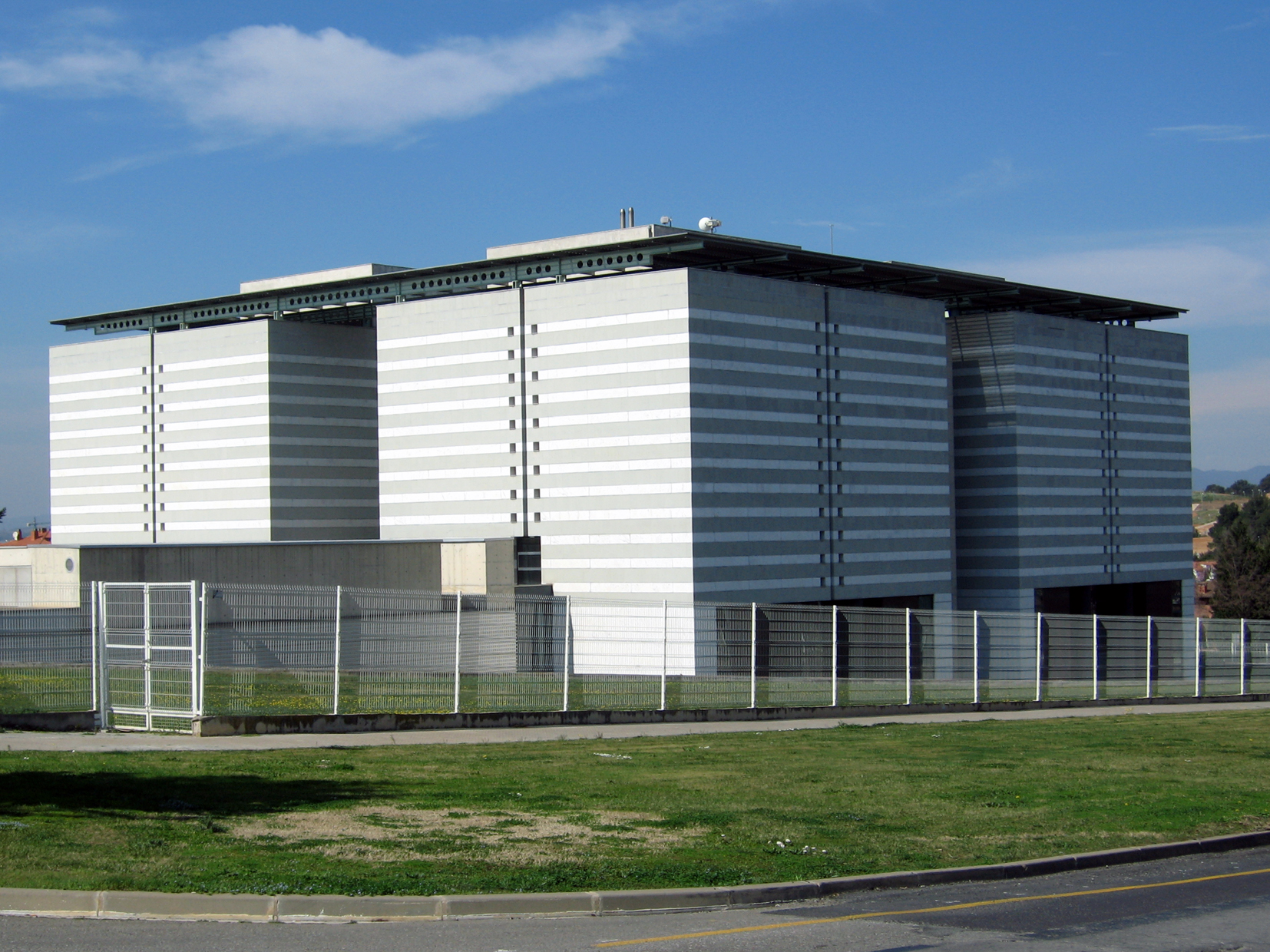
- The National Archive of Catalona building at Sant Cugat del Vallès

Agency overview
- Formed: 28 November 1980
- Jurisdiction: Catalonia, Generalitat of Catalonia
- Headquarters: Sant Cugat del Vallès
- Employees: 40
- Parent department: Ministry of Culture of Catalonia
- Website: anc.gencat.cat

The National Archive of Catalonia (ANC, Catalan: Arxiu Nacional de Catalunya, Occitan: Archiu Nacional de Catalonha, Spanish: Archivo Nacional de Cataluña), is a body created by the Generalitat of Catalonia by decree 28 November 1980. Located in Sant Cugat del Vallès, it is the Catalonia government's official archive, and holds both government and private documents relating to Catalonia's society, politics, economics and history. As government's historical archive, the ANC collects, preserves and disseminates the most relevant records of Catalonia's political and administrative activity of the departments, institutions and companies that make up the Government of Catalonia.

== History ==
The great responsibility of developing the Catalan cultural heritage was started by the Commonwealth of Catalonia, and from 1931 on followed by the Ministry of Culture of Catalonia. In that very same year, a proposal for the creation of a National Archive of Catalonia was made by the Archives, Libraries and Fine Arts Conference, but was only in 1936 that a new archive became a reality. Two years before, as a consequence of the transfer of competences from the Government of Spain to the Generalitat, the archive of the Diputació del General's ownership was transferred to Catalan government.

On 29 September 1936, a decree signed by Josep Tarradellas, stated that the archive would settle in the Palau Episcopal of Barcelona. Afterwards, in 1938 and within the context of the Spanish Civil War, the National Archive of Catalonia moved to the monastery of Pedralbes, until the documents were spread throughout Catalonia in order to save them from war's threat.

Once the war was over, Franquism confiscated all the documents, known from that moment on as Salamanca Papers. Only with the advent of Democracy in the 1980s, the National Archive of Catalonia was officially created by the Generalitat. Its first director was Casimir Martí i Martí (1980-1991), and from 1992 until now, Josep Maria Sans i Travé currently holds the position.

== The building ==
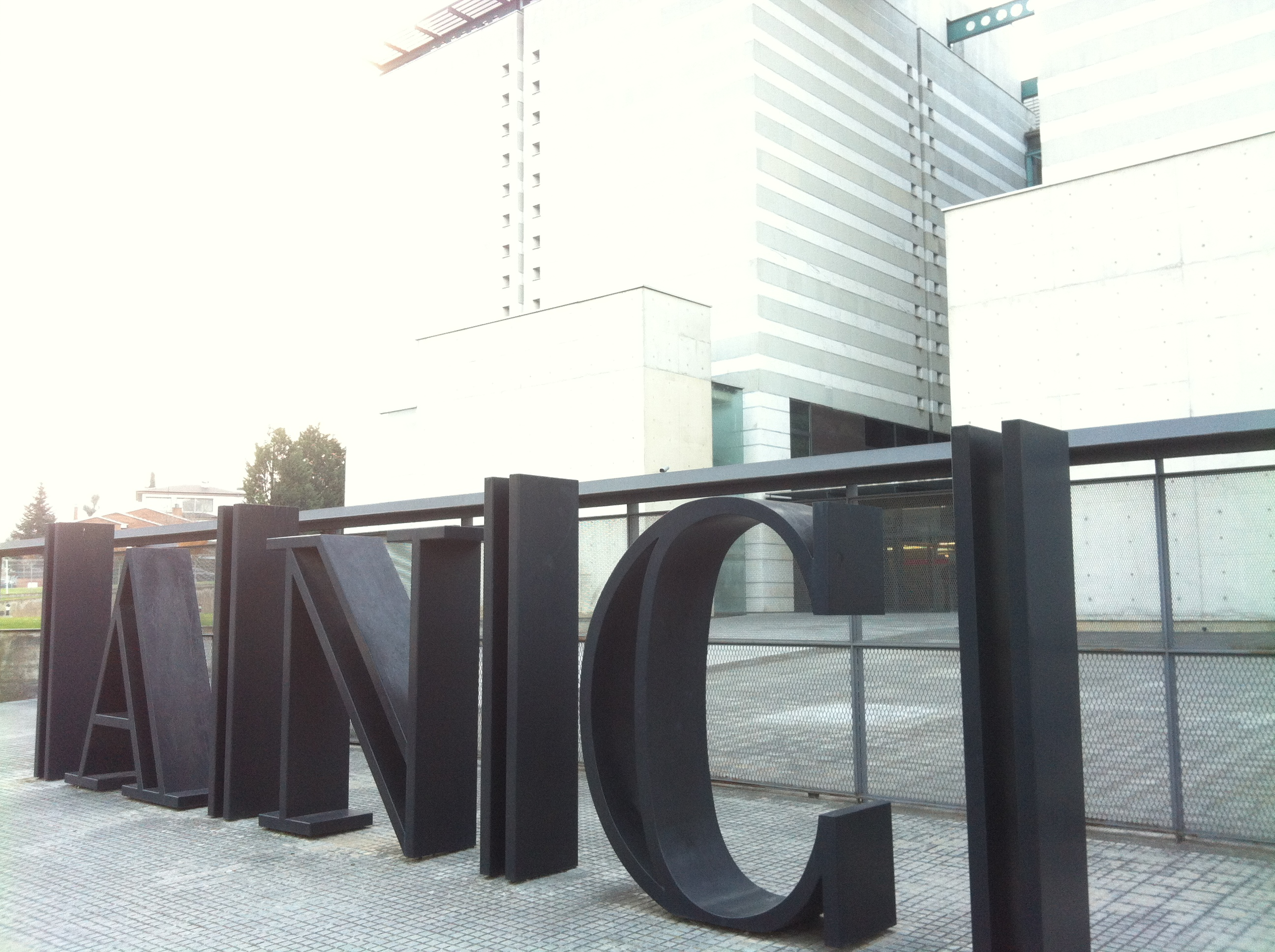
The main entrance of the National Archive of Catalonia

Until 1995, the ANC was located in the Eixample of Barcelona, in an edifice that was used as school and editorial office of both newspapers Solidaridad Obrera and Solidaridad Nacional. Despite refurbishing the structure, the building was not suitable for archive needs and a new one was constructed. The new and bigger archive was inaugurated on 23 April 1995 in Sant Cugat del Vallès in a 17.700 square meters plot.

Its architect, Josep Benedito i Rovira, designed a functional construction divided in four major blocs connected by a courtyard. Most of spaces are used as deposits, and other as administration offices, conservation laboratories and different facilities. As the National Archive of Catalonia holds high-value documents, modern safety conditions were introduced to guarantee the right conservation of the collections.

== Departments ==
With the purpose of providing all the services concerned, the institutions is organised into different divisions:

- Administration Collection Area preservation of Catalan Administration documents, especially from the 19th century.
- Historical Documentation Area, receives private records.
- Images, graphics and audiovisuals Area preserves, recovers and manages image and sound files.
- Reprography and New Technologies Area, cares for carrying out the demands for documents reproduction.
- Restoration Laboratory, is responsible for the conservation and consolidation of the documents.
- Library, consists of an auxiliary library and reserved collections.
- Education Service and Cultural Action Area take care of transmission and dissemination of Catalan culture and society throughout guided tours, workshops, conferences and exhibitions.

== Notable collections ==
There are several notable collections held by the National Archive of Catalonia. These include:

- Autonomous Administration Collection: Documents coming from the Generalitat of Catalonia from the Second Spanish Republic up to the present.
- Local Administration Collection: Relating to the Commonwealth of Catalonia, in the beginning of the 20th century.
- Local-level Public Administration Collection: Records of the administration during the Francoist Dictature.
- Royal and noble Administration Collection: Includes more than 3.000 civil lawsuits from Catalan Royal Audience between the 16th and 19th centuries.
- Judiciary collection: Formed by the documents of different judicial bodies from the 20th century.
- Institutional Collection: Collects the documentation of institutions created by the Generalitat of Catalonia, from the Republic period until now.
- Register Collections: 2.507 log books from Royal brokers of Barcelona between 1780 and 1956.
- Association and Foundation Collections: Includes associations and entities, labor unions and political partnerships.
- Heritage and Family Collections: Most of the documents are connected to nobility and important families in Catalonia.
- Personal Collections: From notable personalities of the 19th and 20th centuries, as for example Francesc Macià, Prat de la Riba, Eugenio d'Ors or Pablo Casals. Furthermore, the collection includes the photographic works of Josep Gaspar, Gabriel Casas, Josep Brangulí or Frederic Cuyàs.

== Bibliography ==
- DDAA Manual d'arxivística i gestió documental. Barcelona. Edit. Associació d'Arxivers de Catalunya, 2009. 543 pàg.
- Arxiu Nacional de Catalunya. L'Arxiu Nacional de Catalunya. Una institució al servei de l'administració de Catalunya, de la societat i de la cultura. (Barcelona), núm. 1. 2000 Arxiu Nacional de Catalunya. Departament de Cultura de la Generalitat de Catalunya.
- Arxiu Nacional de Catalunya. L'Arxiu Nacional de Catalunya. Una infraestructura arxivística i cultural (Barcelona) núm. 3. Arxiu Nacional de Catalunya. Departament de Cultura de la Generalitat de Catalunya.
- CASIMIR, Martí. "L'estat dels arxius a Catalunya. L'Arxiu Nacional de Catalunya". Revista Lligall (Barcelona), núm. 1, pàg. 27–32.
- REVERTÉ VIDAL, Pilar. Apropem-nos a l'exposició "25 anys de l'ANC. La comunicació de la memòria". Col·lecció Exposicions. Una mirada crítica. Núm 2. 2007. Arxiu Nacional de Catalunya. Departament de Cultura de la Generalitat de Catalunya.
- SANS i TRAVÉ, Josep Maria. l'Arxiu Nacional de Catalunya: una institució al servei de l'Administració Autonòmica, la societat i la cultura. Simposi. Arxius Nacionals, Regionals i Generals en els seus marcs territorials (Barcelona), núm. 4. Arxiu Nacional de Catalunya. Departament de Cultura de la Generalitat de Catalunya.
