= Col·lectius de Treballadors =

Catalan trade union

Workers Collectives (in Catalan: Col·lectius de Treballadors, abbreviated CC.TT.) was a Catalan left-nationalist trade union.

== History ==
CC.TT. functioned as the trade union wing of the Socialist Party of National Liberation (PSAN). CC.TT. was formed in May 1977. Prior to the formation of CC.TT., PSAN had worked within CC.OO. In 1979 CC.TT. initiated a policy of cooperation with other trade union forces. In Osona the CC.TT. joined the Workers Trade Union of Osona (Sindicat de Treballadors d'Osona). In 1980 CC.TT. became one of the founding organisations of the Workers Trade Union Confederation of Catalonia (Confederació Sindical de Treballadors de Catalunya)
