= Socialist Party of National Liberation – Provisional =

Socialist Party of National Liberation – Provisional Partit Socialista d'Alliberament Nacional - Provisional
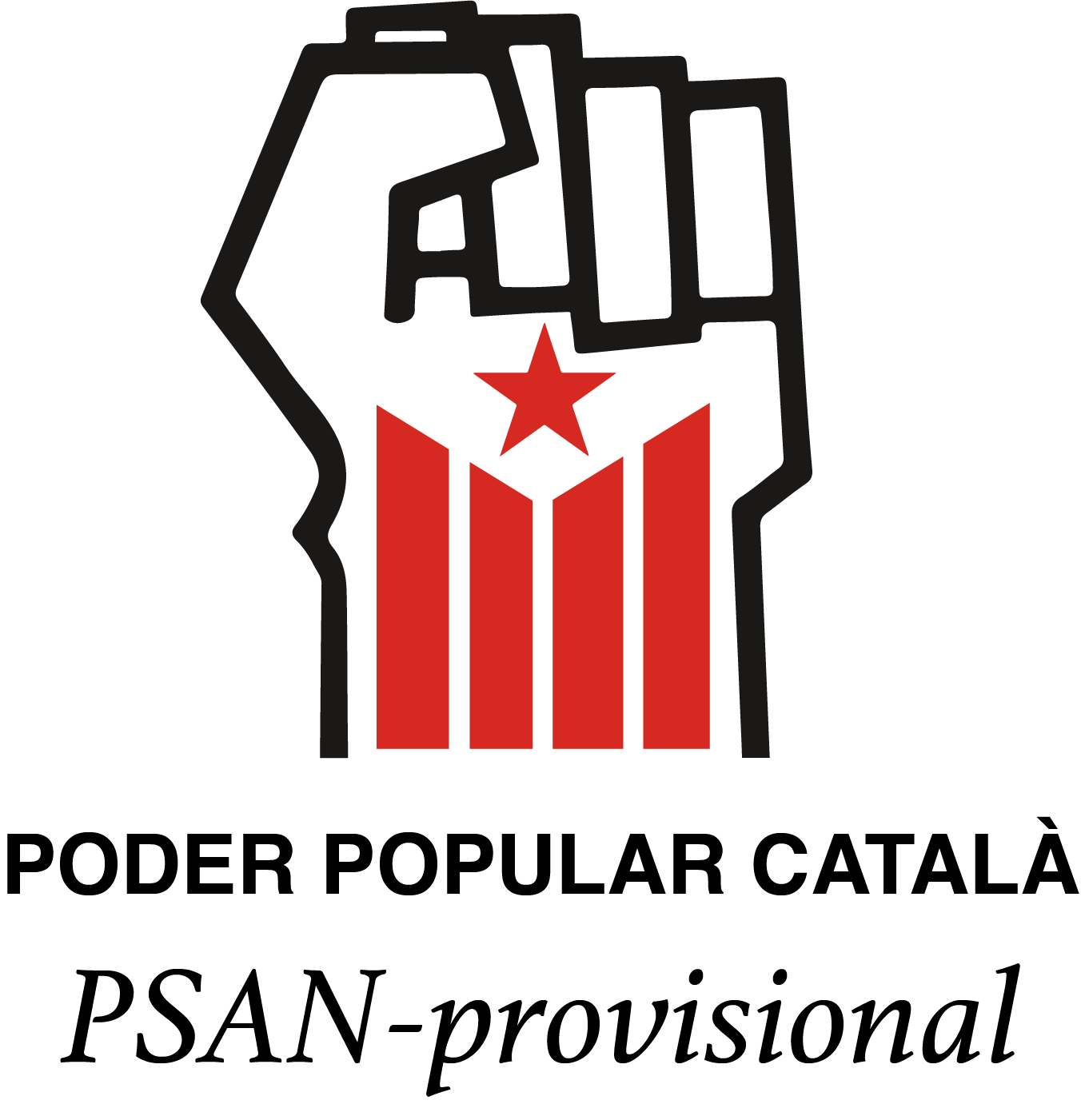
- Founded: 1974; 52 years ago
- Dissolved: 1979; 47 years ago
- Split from: Socialist Party of National Liberation
- Headquarters: Barcelona
- Paramilitary Wing: Organització de la Lluita Armada (OLLA) and Arxiu
- Ideology: Catalan independence Communism; Marxism-Leninism
- Political position: Far-left
- National affiliation: Independentists of the Catalan Countries
- Affiliated union: Col·lectius d'Obrers en Lluita

Socialist Party of National Liberation – Provisional (in Catalan: Partit Socialista d'Alliberament Nacional - Provisional, PSAN-P. PSANp or PSAN (p)) was a Marxist-Leninist, pro-Catalan independence political party in the Catalan Countries. The PSAN-P was formed in 1974, as a split of the Socialist Party of National Liberation (PSAN). The main leaders of the party were Carles Castellanos, Eva Serra i Puig and Agustí Alcoberro.

== Ideology and tactics ==
This new party was more in favor of armed struggle then the PSAN, which forced a significant part of its direction into exile. The PSAN-P had a rupturist and national-popular character and supported direct confrontation with the state. The PSAN-P signed a treaty with ETA and the Unión do Pobo Galego (UPG) to work jointly with this national liberation movements and signed the Brest Charter.

The party was also in favour of a "sectorial front"-like organization. Due to this the PSAN-P created and union, the Col·lectius d'Obrers en Lluita, and helped two armed organizations; Arxiu (1978-1979), Exèrcit d'Alliberament Català and the Organització de la Lluita Armada (OLLA, 1974). In 1978 the PSAN-P and other organizations also created the Catalan Committee against the Spanish Constitution.

The activity of PSAN-P was very irregular, as it did not manage to stabilise the organisation, largely due to three successive deaths of militants: in April 1974, one of its main leaders, Carles Castellanos, was arrested; in September 1974, more were arrested following the disbanding of the Assemblea de Catalunya; and in May 1975, ten more were arrested. In September 1975, when an ETA outbreak occurred in Barcelona, a large part of the leadership went into exile. Many PSAN-P militants also infiltrated border crossings, both to evacuate people fleeing repression and wishing to go into exile, and also to get activists preparing attacks into Catalonia. Among the exiles were Jaume Fernàndez Calvet and Josep Serra "Cala", who remained to live permanently in Northern Catalonia.

In October 1975, the police seized the PSAN-P's propaganda apparatus and arrested around 20 people. In the subsequent amnesties, several militants returned from exile and were released from prison, but further arrests took place in February 1977 and August 1978, accused of being members of the PSAN Provisional or the JRC, as well as of logistical collaboration with the ETA structure in Catalonia. This police pressure led to the imprisonment or exile in Northern Catalonia of most of its leaders during the first years of the organisation's existence. During the years of the democratic transition, while the (official) PSAN began the road to legalisation and a normalised public presence, the Provisional PSAN continued to carry out anti-system and anti-capitalist agitation on the streets, taking part, alone or with other extreme left groups, in numerous illegal demonstrations that often ended in clashes with the police. An example is the demonstrations of "solidarity with the Basque people", which in practice were counter-demonstrations to those called by the parliamentary parties against ETA terrorism. These demonstrations almost always ended with outbreaks of urban guerrilla warfare and the throwing of Molotov cocktails. The PSAN-P was a clandestine or semi-clandestine group and never pursued legalisation.

With the arrival of democracy, the (official) PSAN began the steps to emerge from hiding and become a political party. The incorporation into the Consell de Forces Polítiques (Council of Political Forces) and the demand for legalisation were along these lines. Despite the first refusal of legalisation, the PSAN could carry out its activities and emerged from the underground without much confusion; but the PSAN-P, on the other hand, remained underground and refused to participate in the new democratic political scene - the members of PSAN-P argued that there was hardly any difference between the Francoist regime and the new post-Francoist one. The PSAN-P joined Independentists of the Catalan Countries in March 1979, and disappeared shortly after.
