= Independentists of the Catalan Countries =

Independentists of the Catalan Countries Independentistes dels Països Catalans
- Founded: 1979
- Dissolved: 1985
- Merger of: PSAN-P; OSAN
- Headquarters: Barcelona
- Ideology: Socialism; Catalan independence
- Political position: Left-wing

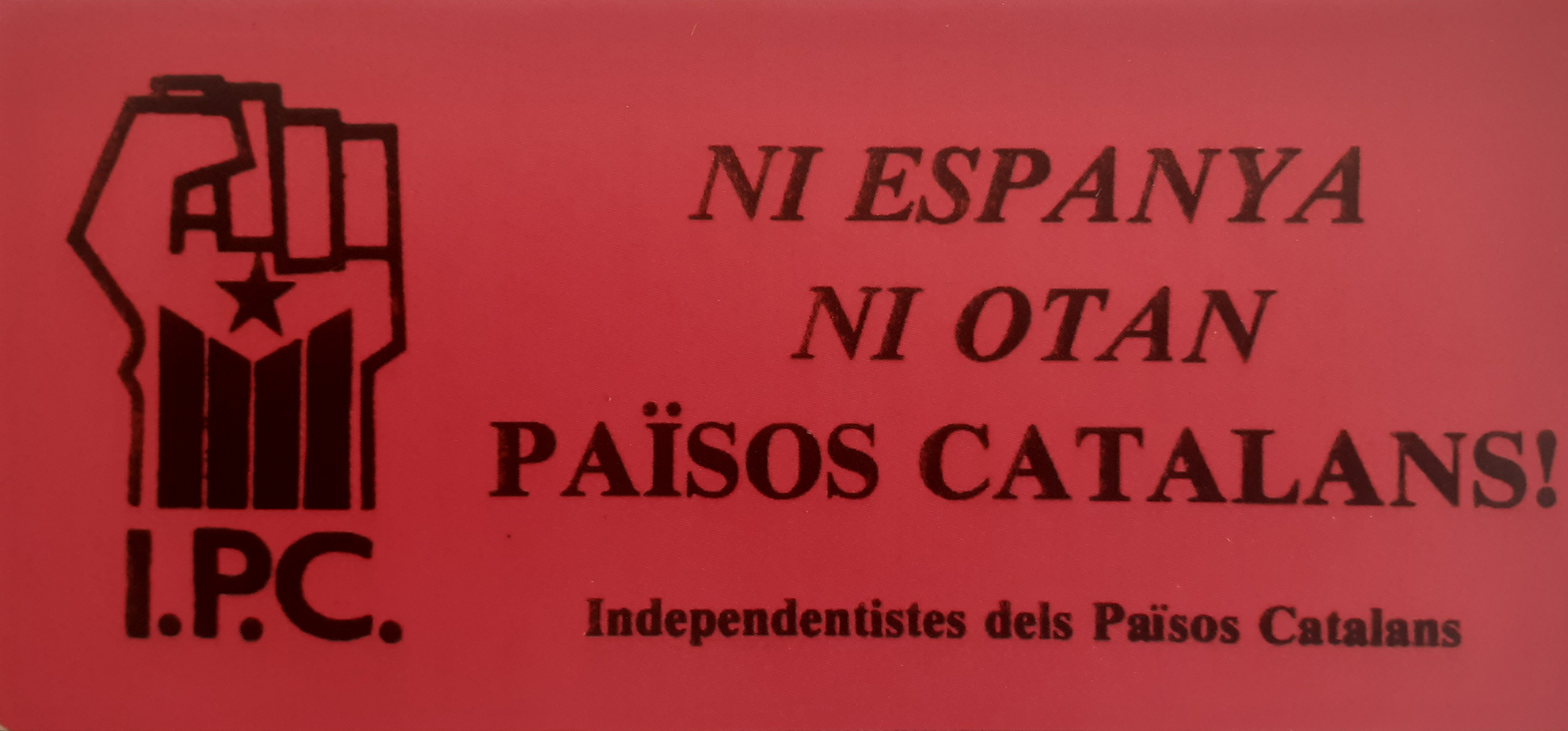

Independentists of the Catalan Countries (in Catalan: Independentistes dels Països Catalans) was an independentist political party in the Catalan Countries. IPC was formed on 3 March 1979 through the merger of the Socialist Party of National Liberation - Provisional (PSAN-p) from the Catalan regions in Spain and the Socialist Organisation of National Liberation (OSAN) from the Catalan region of France. IPC published Lluita.

Front groups of IPC included:

- Committee for Solidarity with the Catalan Patriots (Comitès de Solidaritat amb els Patriotes Catalans, CSPC)
- Workers in Struggle Collectives (Col·lectius d'Obrers en Lluita, COLL)
- Language Defense Groups (Grups de Defensa de la Llengua)
- Independentist Women (Dones Independentistes)

In 1985, IPC took part in the formation of the Movement for Defence of the Land (MDT) together with the Socialist Party of National Liberation (PSAN). IPC had worked for unity amongst Catalan independentists since 1983. In 1988, the rivalry between IPC and PSAN leads to a split in MDT and two separate organisations, both called MDT emerge. Later IPC dissolved itself into the MDT faction aligned with it.
