= Endavant =

Endavant–Organització Socialista d'Alliberament Nacional Forward–Socialist Organisation of National Liberation
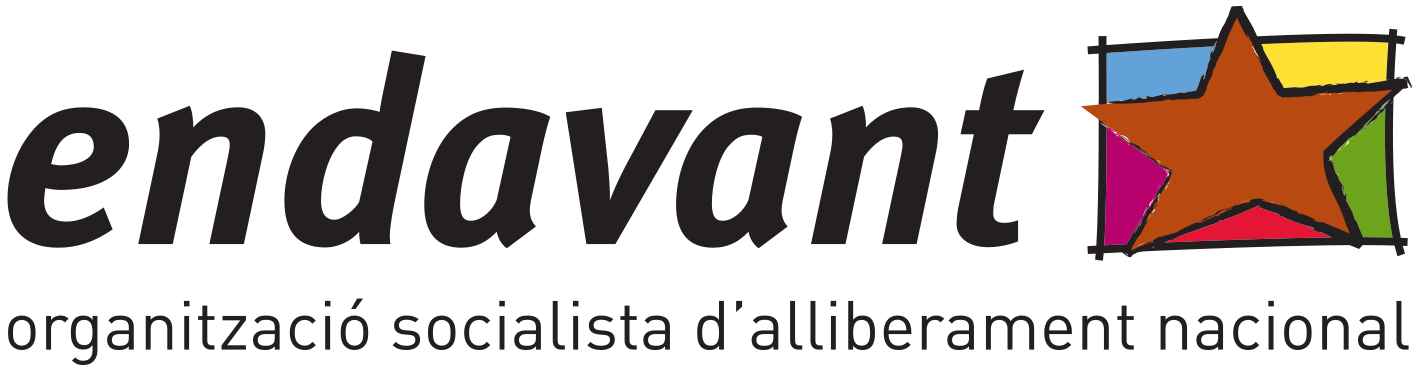
- Founded: 2000
- Merger of: Platform for the Unity of Action; Independents
- Headquarters: C/Tordera, 34 (Barcelona); C/Maldonado, 46 (València); C/Missió, 19 (Palma de Mallorca)
- Newspaper: Tanyada
- Student wing: Sindicat d'Estudiants dels Països Catalans (SEPC)
- Ideology: Socialism; Communism; Catalan independence Feminism; Anti-fascism; Anti-capitalism; Pancatalanism; Euroscepticism
- Political position: Left-wing to far-left
- National affiliation: Popular Unity Candidacy (CUP)
- Trade union affiliation: Coordinadora Obrera Sindical (COS)
- Parliament of Catalonia: 2 / 135

Website
- www.endavant.org

Endavant–Organització Socialista d'Alliberament Nacional (in English: Forward–Socialist Organisation of National Liberation, Endavant (OSAN); commonly referred to only as Endavant) is a pro-Catalan independence, socialist and feminist political party in the Catalan Countries, located primarily in Catalonia. Endavant was formed in July 2000 as a refoundation of the Platform for the Unity of Action, with the support of independents and local collectives. Endavant supports and is part of the Popular Unity Candidates (CUP).

== Ideology and tactics ==
In addition to claiming the independence of the Catalan Countries, Endavant has prioritised working within the social movements and in the struggles of the Catalan anti-capitalist left like combating job insecurity, participated in the campaign against the European Constitution, following the referendum in February 2005, criticising the project for its neoliberal social aspects and the lack of recognition of the Catalan national rights. Endavant has also been part of the "Network Against Closures and Precariousness", which brings together unions and leftist groups, as well as various initiatives to support workers in struggle against the 2008-2015 Spanish Crisis or in favor of the student mobilisations in defense of public education.

The main demonstrations, in conjunction with the rest of the pro-independence left, that the organisation calls yearly are the one on the National Day of Catalonia, 9 of October, 31 December, 25 April, International Women's Day and International Workers' Day.
