= Arran (organization) =

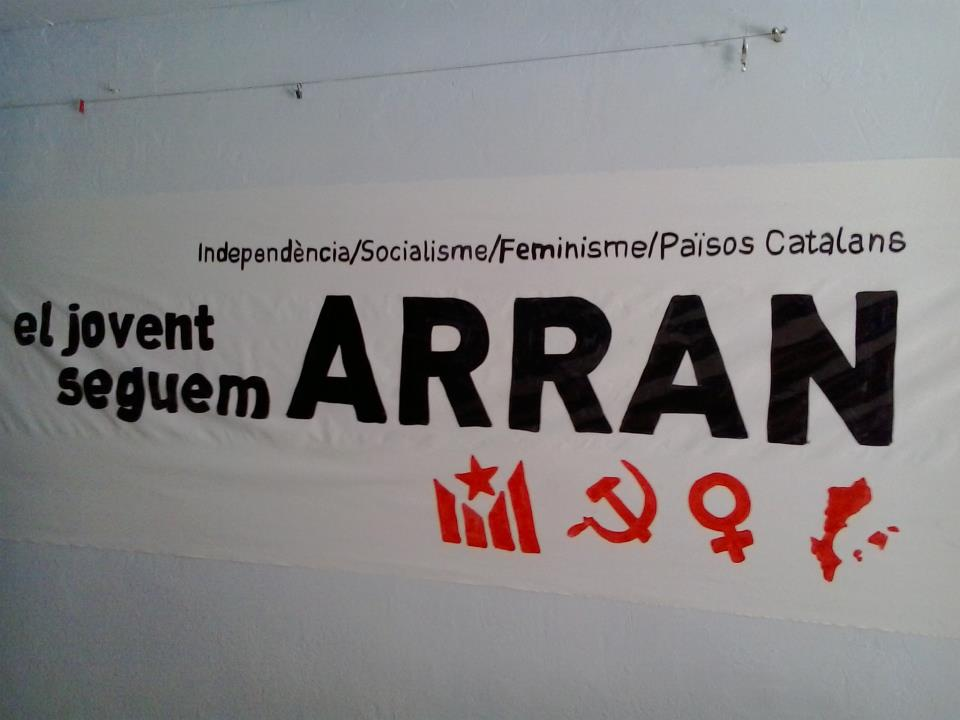
- Arran banner
- Predecessor: Maulets; CAJEI
- Formation: 14 July 2012; 13 years ago
- Purpose: Catalan independentism; Pancatalanism; Socialism; Communism; Feminism
- Region served: Catalan Countries
- Members: 500
- Website: www.arran.cat

Arran (Catalan for "level with") is the youth organization of the Catalan Pro-Independence Left, result of the merger between Maulets and CAJEI and local groups (such as the Youth Assemblies of Terrassa, Sant Sadurní or Horta, a process which began in 2008 and concluded in 2012.

The organization announced its creation on Saturday 14 July 2012 in Berga, during the Rebrot Catalan youth gathering, which celebrated its eleventh edition, culminating in events at the Pi de les Tres Branques annual gathering.

== Ideology ==
Arran is defined as a marxist youth organization that "is committed to political and economic independence and reunification of the Catalan Countries, the attainment of socialism and overcoming patriarchy from a feminist perspective."

The group also promotes other issues such as environmentalism, decent housing and work, anti-fascism, anti-racism, internationalist solidarity and the defense of public and people's education.

It adopts a horizontal structure and often works on a grassroots level.

== Presence ==
In October 2013, Arran claimed presence in 38 counties of the Catalan Countries and had over 700 members.

In August 2017, Arran's attack on a bus of British tourists attracted coverage in the British media. Masked members of Arran stopped the bus, slashed the tyres and daubed slogans on the side. The group published a video of the attack online with the caption “mass tourism kills the neighbourhoods, destroys the territory and condemns the working class to misery”, sparking a police investigation.

In September 2017, Arran published and posted threatening "name and shame" pictures of Catalan politicians in the city of Lleida for not supporting the Catalan Independence referendum.

== Assemblies ==
The organization is distributed in local branches, which can be found throughout Valencian Country, the island of Majorca and Catalonia.
