= Movement for Defence of the Land =

Movement for Defence of the Land Moviment de Defensa de la Terra
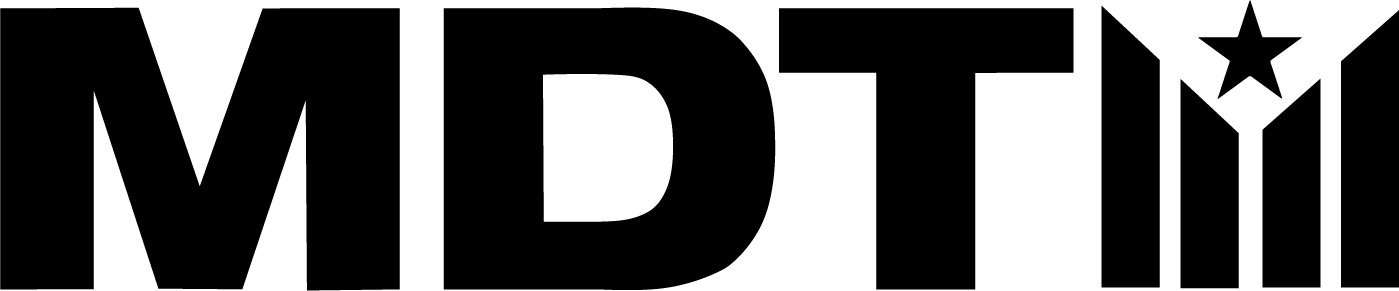
- Founded: 1984; 1998
- Dissolved: 2014
- Merger of: PSAN; IPC; PCV
- Succeeded by: Poble Lliure
- Headquarters: Barcelona
- Youth wing: Maulets
- Ideology: Socialism; Catalan independence Anti-capitalism

The Movement for the Defence of the Land (Catalan: Moviment de Defensa de la Terra, MDT) was the united front of the socialist independence organisations of the Catalan Countries; specifically the Socialist Party of National Liberation (PSAN), Independentists of the Catalan Countries (IPC). In 1986 the movement split in two sectors: the MDT-PSAN and the MDT-IPC. In 1991 the Communist Party of the Valencians (PCV) joined the MDT. The MDT dissolved itself in 2014, and formed a new party: Poble Lliure.
