= Col·lectius d'Obrers en Lluita =

Catalan trade union

Col·lectius d'Obrers en Lluita (Catalan for 'Collectives of Workers in Struggle') was a Catalan left-nationalist trade union. COLL functioned as the trade union wing of the Socialist Party of National Liberation - Provisional (PSAN-p). COLL, which was formed by members of CC.OO. emerged in January 1977, with cells in Barcelona, Lleida and Mallorca. In September the same year COLL broke away from CC.OO.

COLL published Obrers en Lluita.

In 1987 COLL merged into the Trade Union Workers Coordination (Coordinadora Obrera Sindical).
