= Maulets (politics) =

- Founded: 1988
- Dissolved: 2012
- Ideology: Catalan independentism Socialism

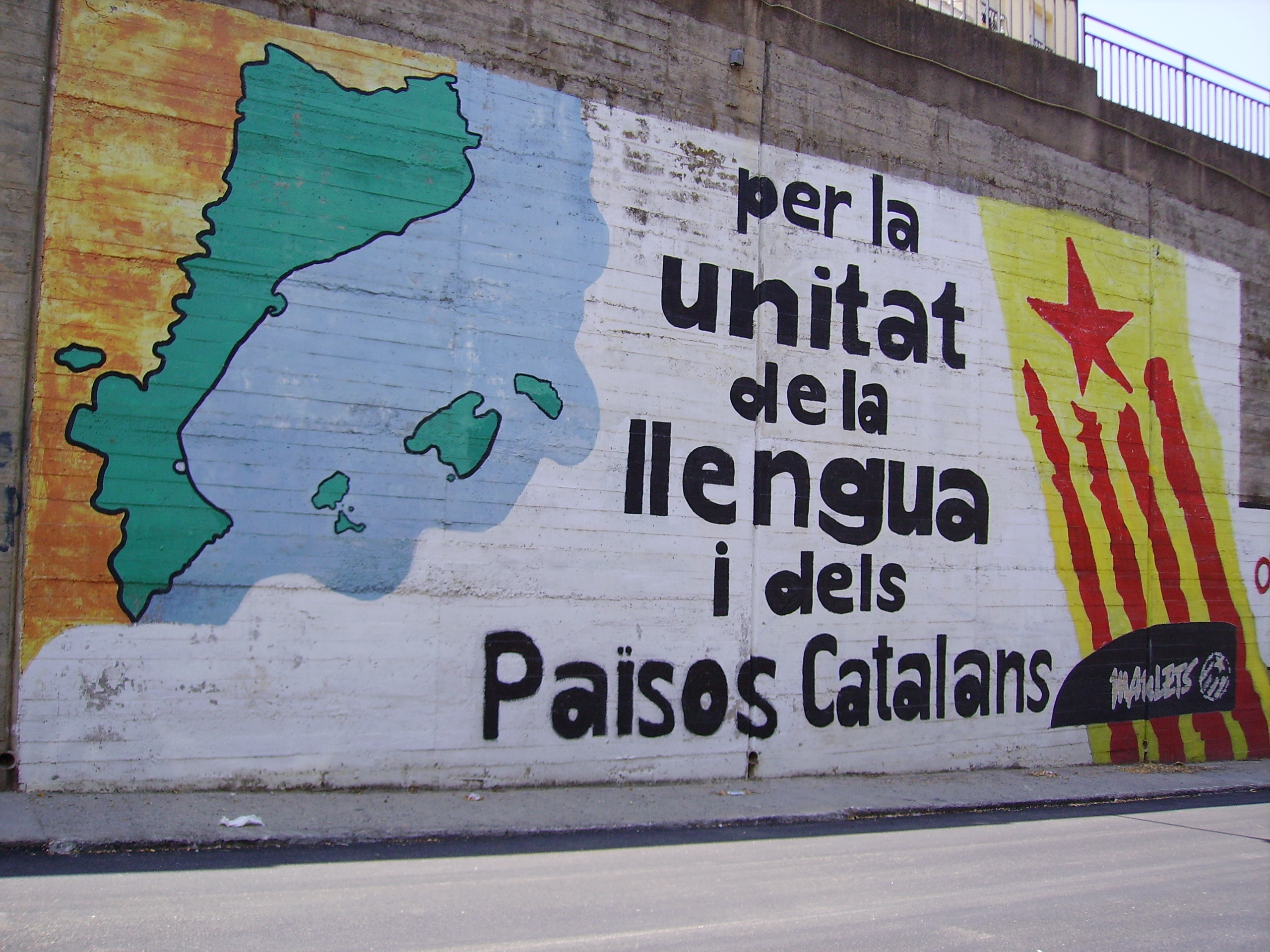
Mural in Argentona, Maresme

Maulets (Eastern Catalan: [məwˈlɛts]) was a youth political organization that belongs to the Catalan left-wing independence movement.

== History ==
Maulets was founded in 1988 as the youth wing of Catalunya Lliure (Free Catalonia). The term "maulet" comes from the popular name given to Austriacist supporters in the Kingdom of Valencia during the War of the Spanish Succession.

By 1998 it had fused with Joventuts Independentistes Revolucionàries (Pro-independence Revolutionary Youth). In 2012 Maulets and CAJEI (Coordinadora d'Assemblees de Joves de l'Esquerra Independentista) were joined after a long process that began in 2008 having as a result the creation of ARRAN, a pro-independence and revolutionary youth organization in the Catalan Countries.

== See also ==
- Assassination of Guillem Agulló
