= Valencia City Council elections =

Local elections in Valencia, Spain

Valencia city council elections have taken place every four years since 1979 to elect the 33 members of the Ayuntamiento of Valencia or local government for the city of Valencia, Spain.

The elections are held using closed list proportional representation in a single electoral district covering the entire city council area. Only parties which receive 5% or more of the total votes cast are eligible for seats which are then allocated on a proportional basis using the D'Hondt method of allocation. The Mayor of Valencia is chosen by the 33 councillors.

From 1979 to 1991 the Mayor came from the Spanish Socialist Workers' Party (PSOE). From 1991 the Mayor was Rita Barberá Nolla of the People's Party (PP), the party which held an absolute majority of seats on the city council from the 1995 to 2011 local elections, until 2015. After 2015 elections, Joan Ribó (Compromís), who came second in the elections, was elected mayor with the support of two other parties. In 2019 elections Joan Ribó came first and was elected again as mayor of Valencia. María José Catalá (PP) has been the Mayor of Valencia since 2023.

== Results ==
Election	Left				Centre-right/Right					Total	Mayor after election	Party
Election	VALC UP	PCE IU	Compromís	PSOE	Cs	URV UV	UCD CDS	AP CP PPCV	Vox	Total	Mayor after election	Party
1979		6		13		1	13			33	Fernando Martínez	PSOE
1983		2		18		0	0	13		33	Ricard Pérez Casado	PSOE
1987		2		13		7	4	7		33	Ricard Pérez Casado	PSOE
1991		3		13		8	0	9		33	Rita Barberá Nolla	PP
1995		5		8		3	0	17		33	Rita Barberá Nolla	PP
1999		2		11		0	0	20		33	Rita Barberá Nolla	PP
2003		2		12		0	0	19		33	Rita Barberá Nolla	PP
2007		0		12		0		21		33	Rita Barberá Nolla	PP
2011		2	3	8				20		33	Rita Barberá Nolla	PP
2015	3	0	9	5	6			10	0	33	Joan Ribó i Canut	Compromís
2019	0		10	7	6			8	2	33	Joan Ribó i Canut	Compromís
2023	0		9	7	0			13	4	33	María José Catalá	PP

=== 1979 Local Election ===
Summary of the 1979 city council election result in Valencia.
Parties and alliances	Votes	%	Seats
Union of the Democratic Centre (UCD)	124,683	36.88	13
Spanish Socialist Workers' Party (PSOE)	122,482	36.23	13
Communist Party of Spain (PCE)	54,124	16.01	6
Valencian Regional Union (Unio Regional Valencianista/URV)	17,342	5.13	1
Communist Movement of the Valencian Country (MCPV)	4,131	1.22	0
Nationalist Party of the Valencian Country (PNPV)	4,010	1.19	0
National Union (FN)	27,447	2.54	0
Others	67,055	6.20	0

Out of a total electorate of 552,034, the turnout was 344,145 (62.3%.)

Candidates for Mayor were:-

- Fernando Martínez Castellanos (PSOE)
- Miguel Pastor (UCD)
- Vicente Blasco Ibáñez (URV)

Martínez was elected Mayor with the support of the PCE. When Felipe González decided to eliminate any residual Marxism from the party's constitution he resigned in protest in September 1979. He was replaced in October 1979 by Ricard Pérez Casado.

=== 1983 Local Election ===
Summary of the 1983 city council election result in Valencia.
Parties and alliances	Votes	%	Change	Seats	Change
Spanish Socialist Workers' Party (PSOE)	186,445	49.04	+12.81	18	+5
People's Coalition^{*}	141,689	37.27	N/A	13	N/A
Communist Party of Spain (PCE)	28,863	7.59	-8.42	2	-4
Democratic and Social Centre (CDS)	7,360	1.94	N/A		N/A
Unity of the Valencian People (UPV)	5,685	1.50	N/A		N/A
Valencian Regional Union (URV)	4,717	1.24	-3.89		-1
Liberal Democratic Party (PDL)	3,225	0.85	N/A		N/A
Valencian Independent Organisation (OIV)	1,651	0.43	N/A		N/A
Others	523	0.1	N/A		N/A

^{*}The People's Coalition was an electoral alliance which consisted of 4 parties: the Popular Alliance, Valencian Union, Democratic Popular Party and Liberal Union.

Out of a total electorate of 553,067, the turnout was 386,699 (69.9%), a 7.6% increase on the previous election.

A few months prior to the elections, the UCD, which had won the most votes in the 1979 elections, had disbanded. In their absence, the People's Coalition took most of the right wing vote, while the PCE declined and URV lost their solitary seat. This was the only occasion to date when the PSOE won a majority of seats on Valencia City Council. Ricard Pérez Casado was re-elected Mayor.

=== 1987 Local Election ===
Summary of the 1987 city council election result in Valencia.
Parties and alliances	Votes	%	Change	Seats	Change
Spanish Socialist Workers' Party (PSOE)	143,037	37.17	-11.87	13	-5
Valencian Union	77,353	20.10	N/A	7	N/A
Popular Alliance	73,830	19.19	N/A	7	N/A
Democratic and Social Centre (CDS)	44,133	11.47	+9.53	4	+4
United Left (IU) - Unity of the Valencian People (UPV)	30,963	8.05	N/A	2	N/A
Workers' Party (PTE) – Communist Unity	5,608	1.46	N/A		N/A
Greens	3,225	0.85	N/A		N/A
Valencian Electoral Coalition (CEV)	2,370	0.62	N/A		N/A
Democratic Popular Party (PDP)	1,096	0.28	N/A		N/A
Others	3,140	0.82	N/A		N/A

Out of a total electorate of 552,473, the turnout was 389,214 (71.4%), a 1.5% increase on the previous election.

The electoral alliance between the Popular Alliance, the Valencian Union and the Democratic Popular Party broke up in 1986 and all three parties contested the elections in their own right with Valencian Union finishing ahead of the Popular Alliance in terms of votes. The Communist Party of Spain (PCE) had formed an electoral alliance, United Left, with other left wing groupings the previous year and United Left in turn ran in the elections in a joint list with Unity of the Valencian People, however they were unable to increase the number of seats that the PCE had won in 1983. The main gains were made by CDS who won their first seats on the council.

Candidates for Mayor were:-

- Ricard Pérez Casado (PSOE)
- Vicente González Lizondo (UV)
- Martín Quirós (AP)
- Manuel Del Hierro (CDS)

Though PSOE had lost their overall majority, they regained the mayoralty with the support of IU and the CDS. In January 1989 Ricard Pérez Casado was replaced as Mayor by Clementina Ródenas also of the PSOE. In 1989 the Popular Alliance and the Democratic Popular Party merged with other right wing parties to form the People's Party.

=== 1991 Local Election ===
Summary of the 1991 city council election result in Valencia.
Parties and alliances	Votes	%	Change	Seats	Change
Spanish Socialist Workers' Party (PSOE)	139,272	37.65	+0.48	13	
People's Party (Spain) (PP)	95,238	25.74	N/A	9	N/A
Valencian Union (UV)	80,500	21.76	+1.66	8	+1
United Left (IU)	29,855	8.07	+0.02	3	+1
Greens	8,945	2.42	+1.57		
Democratic and Social Centre (CDS)	7,774	2.10	-9.31		-4
Unity of the Valencian People (UPV)	5,982	1.62	N/A		N/A
Others	2,374	0.64	N/A		N/A

Out of a total electorate of 591,157, the turnout was 374,946 (63.4%), an 8% decrease on the previous election.

One of the main features of the election was the collapse in support for the CDS, who lost their representation on the council. As a result, all the main four groupings, the PSOE, IU, PP and UV, increased their vote share, with PP gaining 2 seats relative to the Popular Alliance's 1987 performance and both UV and IU gaining a seat.

Candidates for Mayor were:-

- Clementina Ródenas (PSOE)
- Rita Barberà (PP),
- Vicente González Lizondo (UV)
- Manuel Moret (EUPV)
- Vicent Álvarez (UPV)
- Luis Gil (CDS)

Although the PSOE had had a slight increase in their vote share, UV councillors voted for the PP candidate, Rita Barberà. Both parties governed Valencia with a one-seat majority.

=== 1995 Local Election ===
Summary of the 1995 city council election result in Valencia.
Parties and alliances	Votes	%	Change	Seats	Change
People's Party (Spain) (PP)	223,963	49.58	+23.84	17	+8
Spanish Socialist Workers' Party (PSOE)	110,071	24.37	-13.28	8	-5
United Left (IU) - Greens	67,532	14.95	N/A	5	+2
Valencian Union (UV)	41,019	9.08	-12.68	3	-5
Greens	8,945	2.42	+1.57		
Democratic and Social Centre (CDS)	1,645	0.36	-1.74		
Unity of the Valencian People (UPV) – Valencian Nationalist Bloc (BNV)	4,290	0.95	-0.67		
Others	3,174	0.72	N/A		N/A

Out of a total electorate of 627,784, the turnout was 485,649 (73.1%), a 9.7% increase on the previous election.

The election saw both the People's Party and United Left making gains at the expense of the PSOE and Valencian Union. The People's Party almost doubled its share of the vote and made enough gains to hold an absolute majority on the city council.

Candidates for Mayor were:-

- Rita Barberà (PP)
- Aurelio Martínez (PSOE)
- Manuel Moret (EUPV)
- Juan Vicente (UV)

Rita Barberà was re-elected Mayor.

=== 1999 Local Election ===
Summary of the 1999 city council election result in Valencia.
Parties and alliances	Votes	%	Change	Seats	Change
People's Party (Spain) (PP)	214,129	54.25	+4.67	20	+3
Spanish Socialist Workers' Party (PSOE)	116,437	29.50	+5.13	11	+3
United Left (IU)	25,602	6.49	-8.46	2	-3
Valencian Union (UV)	19,070	4.83	-4.25		-3
Valencian Nationalist Bloc (BNV) - Greens	12,897	3.27	N/A		N/A
Others	6,553	1.66	N/A		N/A

Out of a total electorate of 643,516, the turnout was 403,583 (62.7%), a 10.4% decrease on the previous election.

The election saw both the People's Party and PSOE making gains at the expense of the Valencian Union and United Left. For the first time the People's Party polled a majority of votes. Valencian Union narrowly missed the 5% threshold for representation on the council and lost its remaining seats.

Candidates for Mayor were:-

- Rita Barberà (PP)
- Ana Noguera (PSOE)
- Antonio Montalbán (IU)
- Társilo Piles (UV)

Rita Barberà was re-elected Mayor.

=== 2003 Local Election ===
Summary of the 2003 city council election result in Valencia.
Parties and alliances	Votes	%	Change	Seats	Change
People's Party (Spain) (PP)	220,548	52.00	-2.25	19	-1
Spanish Socialist Workers' Party (PSOE)	132,903	31.33	+1.83	12	+1
United Left (IU)	31,519	7.43	+0.94	2	
Valencian Union (UV)	15,593	3.68	-1.15		
Valencian Nationalist Bloc (BNV) - Greens	11,201	2.64	N/A		N/A
Cannabis Party (PCPLYN)	4,177	0.98	N/A		N/A
Greens	3,369	0.79	N/A		N/A
Others	4,840	1.13	N/A		N/A

Out of a total electorate of 631,225, the turnout was 432,336 (68.5%), a 5.8% increase on the previous election.

The election saw little change relative to the previous election. PSOE made a small increase at the expense of the People's Party and gained a seat from them.

Candidates for Mayor were:-

- Rita Barberà (PP)
- Rafael Rubio (PSOE)
- Antonio Montalbán (IU)
- José María Chiquillo Barber (UV)
- Ferran Puchades (BNV)

Rita Barberà was re-elected Mayor.

=== 2007 Local Election ===
Summary of the 2007 city council election result in Valencia.
Parties and alliances	Votes	%	Change	Seats	Change
People's Party (Spain) (PP)	235,158	57.45	+5.45	21	+2
Spanish Socialist Workers' Party (PSOE)	140,187	34.25	+2.92	12	
United Left (IU) - Greens	19,808	4.84	-2.59		-2
Valencian Coalition	5,615	1.37	N/A		N/A
Valencian Union (UV)	3,279	0.80	-2.88		
Others	5,291	1.28	N/A		N/A

Out of a total electorate of 608,976, the turnout was 416,802 (68.4%), a 0.1% decrease on the previous election.

The election saw a continuation of the trend towards a Two-party system with United Left losing their representation on the council due to them falling below the 5% threshold for representation. This was the first occasion on which either United Left or their predecessors the Communist Party would be unrepresented. Though both main parties increased their vote share, the main beneficiaries were the People's Party who gained both the United Left seats.

Candidates for Mayor were:-

- Rita Barberà (PP)
- Carmen Alborch (PSOE)
- Amadeu Sanchis (IU)
- Vicente González-Lizondo Sánchez (UV)
- Juan García Sentandreu (CV)

Rita Barberà was re-elected Mayor.

=== 2011 Local Election ===
Summary of the 2011 city council election result in Valencia.
Parties and alliances	Votes	%	Change	Seats	Change
People's Party (Spain) (PP)	208,727	52.54	-4.91	20	-1
Spanish Socialist Workers' Party (PSOE)	86,440	21.76	-12.49	8	-4
Coalició Compromís (Compromís)	35,881	9.03	N/A	3	N/A
United Left of the Valencian Country (EUPV)	28,489	7.17	+2.33	2	+2
Union, Progress and Democracy (UPyD)	11,243	2.83	N/A		N/A
Confederation of the Greens (LV)	5,177	1.30	N/A		N/A
Valencian Coalition	2,219	0.56	-0.81		
Others	10,419	2.63	N/A		N/A

The turnout was 69.4%, an increase of 1% on the previous election.

The result was considered a surprise by the largest circulation daily newspaper El País, as Coalició Compromís, an electoral alliance led by the Valencian Nationalist Bloc, won their first seats on the council, while United Left returned to the council after a four-year absence.

Candidates for Mayor were:-

- Rita Barberà (PP)
- Joan Calabuig (PSOE)
- Amadeu Sanchis (IU)
- Joan Ribó (Compromís)
- Ramón Igual (UPyD)

Rita Barberà was re-elected Mayor.

=== 2015 Local Election ===
Summary of the 24 May 2015 city council election result in Valencia.
Parties and alliances	Votes	%	Change	Seats	Change
People's Party (Spain) (PP)	107,435	25.7		10	-10
Coalició Compromís (Compromís)	97,114	23.3		9	+6
Citizens (C's)	64,228	15.4		6	+6
Spanish Socialist Workers' Party (PSOE)	58,338	14		5	-3
Valencia in common (VALC)	40,927	9.82		3	+3
United Left of the Valencian Country (EUPV)	19,639	4.71		0	-2
Union, Progress and Democracy (UPyD)	5,757	1.38			
Animalist Party Against Mistreatment to Animals (PACMA)	4,518	1.09			
Others					

The turnout was 72.1%, the highest turnout since the 1995 election. The election saw Rita Barberá's PP lost its majority for the first time since the 1990s. Compromís had its highest number of votes in history and came second in the election. Citizens won representation on the council for the first time. PSOE lost almost half its representation and Podemos, as part of València en Comú, won representation for the first time. United Left lost its representation.

Candidates for Mayor were:

- Rita Barberà (PP)
- Joan Ribó (Compromís)
- Fernando Giner (Ciudadanos)
- Joan Calabuig (PSOE)
- Jordi Peris (València en Comú)
- Amadeu Sanchis (IU)

Joan Ribó (Compromís) was elected Mayor, with the support of PSOE and València en Comú

=== 2019 Local Election ===
Parties and alliances	Votes	%	Change	Seats	Change
Coalició Compromís (Compromís)	106,395	27.44		10	+1
People's Party (Spain) (PP)	84,328	21.75		8	-2
Spanish Socialist Workers' Party (PSOE)	74,597	19.24		7	+2
Citizens (C's)	68,283	17.61		6	=
Vox (VOX)	28,126	7.25		2	+2
Podemos-United Left of the Valencian Country (Podemos-EUPV)	16,158	4.17		0	-3
Others					

The turnout was 66.3%, a decrease on the previous election.

Compromís received the most votes for the first time, with an increase on the previous election. PP's decline continued, losing two seats to the far-right party Vox, who won its first seats. PSOE gained two seats, its first increase in representation since the 2003 elections. Citizens repeated the same results. The Podemos-United Left coalition lost its representation, having stood as part of València en Comú at the previous election.

Candidates for Mayor were:

- Joan Ribó (Compromís)
- María José Catalá (PP)
- Sandra Gómez (PSOE)
- Fernando Giner (Ciudadanos)
- José Gosalbez Paya (Vox)
- Maria Oliver (Podemos-IU)

Joan Ribó (Compromís) was re-elected Mayor, with the support of PSOE.

=== 2023 Local Election ===
Parties and alliances	Votes	%	Change	Seats	Change
People's Party (Spain) (PP)	151,482	36.63	+14.85	13	+5
Coalició Compromís (Compromís)	99,122	23.97	-3.47	9	-1
Spanish Socialist Workers' Party (PSOE)	78,499	18.98	-0.32	7	=
Vox (VOX)	52,695	12.74	+5.49	4	+2
Podemos-United Left of the Valencian Country (Podemos-EUPV)	9,677	2.34	-1.83	0	=
Citizens (C's)	9,588	2.32	-15.29	0	-6
Others					

The turnout was 68.5%, an increase on the previous election.

The election saw the collapse of Citizens, who lost all their 6 seats. The PP regained their status as largest party.

Candidates for Mayor were:

- María José Catalá (PP)
- Joan Ribó (Compromís)
- Sandra Gómez (PSOE)
- Fernando Giner (Ciudadanos)
- Juan Manuel Badenas (Vox)

With no candidate able to secure a majority on the first ballot, Catalá became mayor on the second ballot as lead candidate of the party with most votes.
