= List of mayors of Valencia =

Mayor of Valencia
- Alcalde de Valencia
- Coat of arms of Valencia

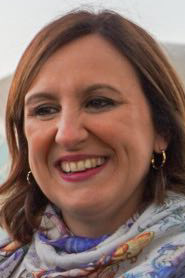
- Incumbent; María José Catalá since 17 June 2023
- Seat: Valencia City Hall
- Appointer: City Council of Valencia
- Term length: 4 years, renewable
- Constituting instrument: Organic Law 5/1985
- Inaugural holder: Domingo Mascarós Vicente
- Formation: 1840
- Website: https://www.valencia.es/cas/ayuntamiento/alcaldia

This is a list of mayors of Valencia since 1840. The Mayor of Valencia is the highest political authority of the Valencia City Council. In accordance with Organic Law 5/1985, of June 19, on the General Electoral Regime (currently in force), the mayor or mayoress is elected by the municipal corporation of councilors, who in turn are elected by universal suffrage by the citizens of Valencia with the right to vote, through municipal elections held every four years. The candidate who obtains the absolute majority of the votes is proclaimed elected. If none of them obtains said majority, the councilor who heads the most voted list is proclaimed mayor.

== List of mayors ==
=== Spanish transition to democracy ===
#	Name	Portrait	Term in office		Council election	Party affiliation
#	Name	Portrait	Started	Ended	Council election	Party affiliation
1	Fernando Martínez Castellano		19 April 1979	5 October 1979 (200 days)	1979	Socialist Party of the Valencian Country
2	Ricard Pérez Casado		5 October 1979	13 January 1989 (9 years, 69 days)	1983; 1987	Socialist Party of the Valencian Country
3	Clementina Ródenas Villena		13 January 1989	5 July 1991 (2 years, 173 days)	_	Socialist Party of the Valencian Country
4	Rita Barberá Nolla		5 July 1991	13 June 2015 (23 years, 343 days)	1991; 1995; 1999; 2003; 2007; 2011	People's Party of the Valencian Community
5	Joan Ribó Canut		13 June 2015	17 June 2023 (8 years, 4 days)	2015; 2019	Compromís
6	María José Catalá Verdet		17 June 2023	Present	2023	People's Party of the Valencian Community

== See also ==
- Timeline of Valencia
- Generalitat Valenciana
