= 2011 Valencia municipal election =

Election in the Spanish municipality of Valencia

- 22 May 2011

All 33 seats in the City Council of Valencia 17 seats needed for a majority
- Opinion polls
- Registered: 579,733 ▼4.8%
- Turnout: 402,400 (69.4%) ▲1.0 pp
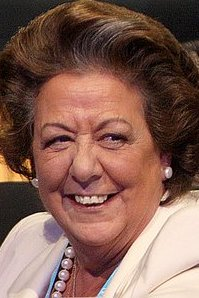

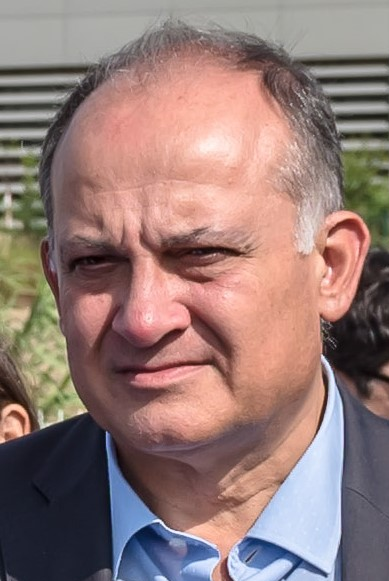

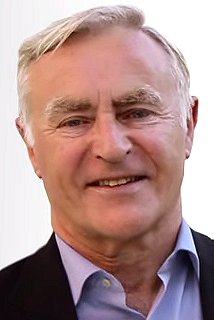

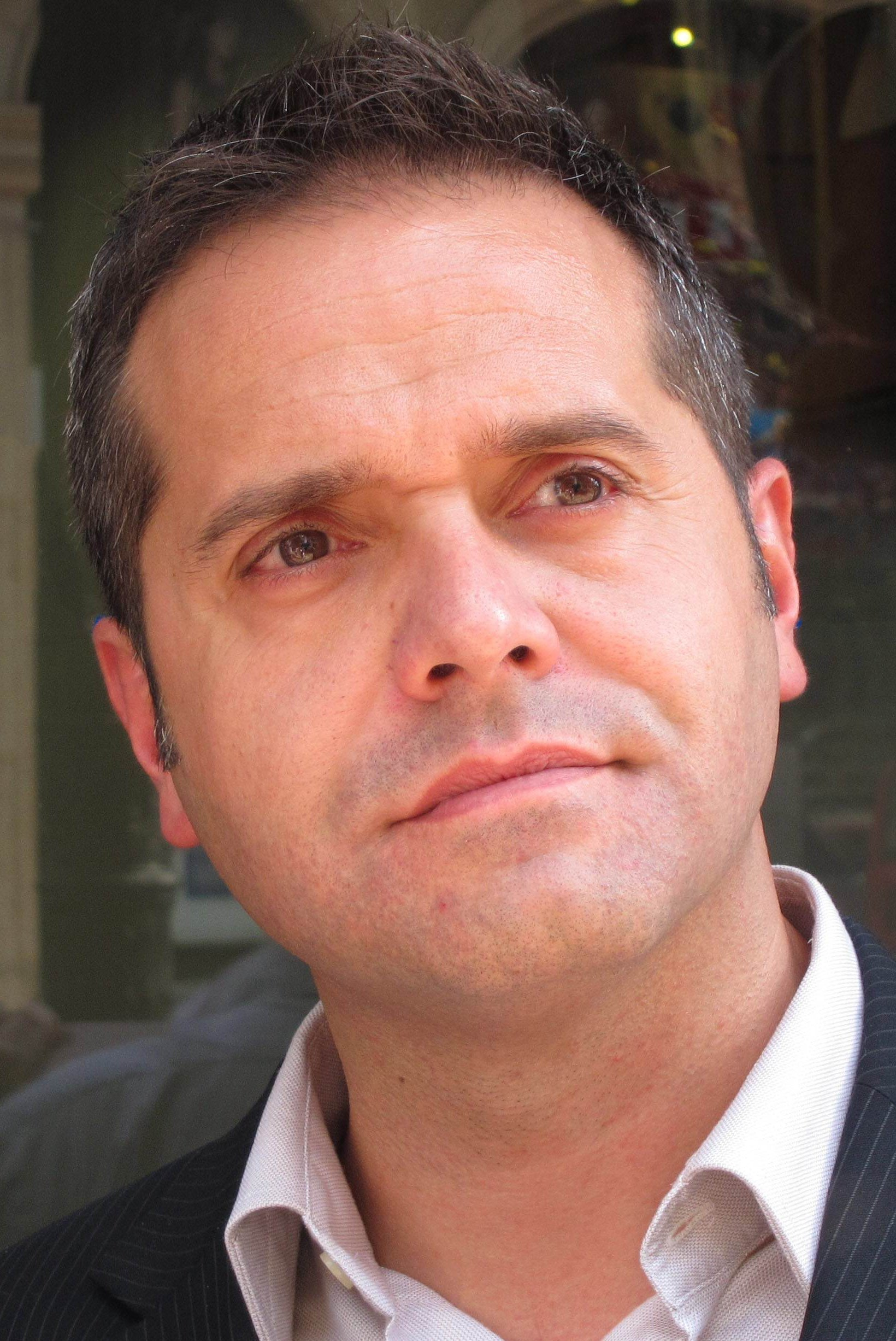
	First party	Second party	Third party
Leader	Rita Barberá	Joan Calabuig	Joan Ribó
Party	PP	PSPV–PSOE	Compromís
Leader since	1991	3 October 2010	7 May 2010
Last election	21 seats, 56.7%	12 seats, 33.8%	Did not contest
Seats won	20	8	3
Seat change	▼1	▼4	▲3
Popular vote	208,727	86,440	35,881
Percentage	52.5%	21.8%	9.0%
Swing	▼4.2 pp	▼12.0 pp	New party
	Fourth party
Leader	Amadeu Sanchis
Party	EUPV
Leader since	2004
Last election	0 seats, 4.8%
Seats won	2
Seat change	▲2
Popular vote	28,489
Percentage	7.2%
Swing	▲2.4 pp
Mayor before election
Rita Barberá
PP
Mayor after election
Rita Barberá
PP

A municipal election was held in Valencia on 22 May 2011 to elect the 9th City Council of the municipality. All 33 seats in the City Council were up for election. It was held concurrently with regional elections in thirteen autonomous communities and local elections all across Spain.

The election saw the ruling People's Party (PP) obtaining a new absolute majority, which allowed incumbent Mayor Rita Barberá to be re-elected for a sixth consecutive term in office. On the other hand, the Spanish Socialist Workers' Party (PSOE) saw a sharp decline in support, suffering from the nationwide backlash against José Luis Rodríguez Zapatero-led Government of Spain amid a harsh financial crisis at the time and scoring its worst historical result in a municipal election up to that point.

Also entering the City Council were the Compromís coalition (English: Commitment), formed by the Valencian Nationalist Bloc (Bloc), Initiative of the Valencian People (IdPV) and The Greens–Ecologist Left of the Valencian Country (EV–EE), which emerged as the third political force in the city; and United Left of the Valencian Country (EUPV), the regional branch of United Left, which returned to the City Council after being left out in the previous election.

== Overview ==
Under the 1978 Constitution, the governance of municipalities in Spain—part of the country's local government system—was centered on the figure of city councils (Spanish: ayuntamientos), local corporations with independent legal personality composed of a mayor, a government council and an elected legislative assembly. The mayor was indirectly elected by the local assembly, requiring an absolute majority; otherwise, the candidate from the most-voted party automatically became mayor (ties were resolved by drawing lots). In the case of Valencia, the top-tier administrative and governing body was the City Council of Valencia.

=== Date ===
The term of local assemblies in Spain expired four years after the date of their previous election, with election day being fixed for the fourth Sunday of May every four years. The election decree was required to be issued no later than 54 days before the scheduled election date and published on the following day in the Official State Gazette (BOE). The previous local elections were held on 27 May 2007, setting the date for election day on the fourth Sunday of May four years later, which was 22 May 2011.

Local assemblies could not be dissolved before the expiration of their term, except in cases of mismanagement that seriously harmed the public interest and implied a breach of constitutional obligations, in which case the Council of Ministers could—optionally—decide to call a by-election.

Elections to the assemblies of local entities were officially called on 29 March 2011 with the publication of the corresponding decree in the BOE, setting election day for 22 May.

=== Electoral system ===
Voting for local assemblies was based on universal suffrage, comprising all Spanish nationals over 18 years of age, registered and residing in the municipality and with full political rights (provided that they had not been deprived of the right to vote by a final sentence, nor were legally incapacitated), as well as resident non-national European citizens, and those whose country of origin allowed reciprocal voting by virtue of a treaty.

Local councillors were elected using the D'Hondt method and closed-list proportional voting, with a five percent-threshold of valid votes (including blank ballots) in each municipality. Each municipality was a multi-member constituency, with a number of seats based on the following scale (amended for smaller municipalities in 2011):

Population	Councillors
<100	3
101–250	5
251–1,000	7
1,001–2,000	9
2,001–5,000	11
5,001–10,000	13
10,001–20,000	17
20,001–50,000	21
50,001–100,000	25
>100,001	+1 per each 100,000 inhabitants or fraction +1 if total is an even number

The law did not provide for by-elections to fill vacant seats; instead, any vacancies arising after the proclamation of candidates and during the legislative term were filled by the next candidates on the party lists or, when required, by designated substitutes.

== Parties and candidates ==
The electoral law allowed for parties and federations registered in the interior ministry, alliances and groupings of electors to present lists of candidates. Parties and federations intending to form an alliance were required to inform the relevant electoral commission within 10 days of the election call, whereas groupings of electors needed to secure the signature of a determined amount of the electors registered in the municipality for which they sought election, disallowing electors from signing for more than one list. In the case of Valencia, as its population was between 300,001 and 1,000,000, at least 5,000 signatures were required. Additionally, a balanced composition of men and women was required in the electoral lists, so that candidates of either sex made up at least 40 percent of the total composition.

Below is a list of the main parties and alliances which contested the election:

Candidacy	Parties and alliances	Leading candidate	Ideology	Previous result		Gov.	Ref.
Candidacy	Parties and alliances	Leading candidate	Ideology	Vote %	Seats	Gov.	Ref.
PP	List: People's Party (PP)	Rita Barberá	Conservatism; Christian democracy	56.7%	21	Yes	
PSPV–PSOE	List: Socialist Party of the Valencian Country (PSPV–PSOE)	Joan Calabuig	Social democracy	33.8%	12	No	
EUPV	List: United Left of the Valencian Country (EUPV) – Communist Party of the Valencian Country (PCPV) – Revolutionary Workers' Party (POR) – Republican Left (IR)	Amadeu Sanchis	Socialism; Communism	4.8%	0	No	
Compromís	List: Valencian Nationalist Bloc (Bloc); Valencian People's Initiative (IdPV); Greens Equo of the Valencian Country (VerdsEquo)	Joan Ribó	Valencianism; Progressivism; Green politics	Did not contest		No	

== Opinion polls ==
The tables below list opinion polling results in reverse chronological order, showing the most recent first and using the dates when the survey fieldwork was done, as opposed to the date of publication. Where the fieldwork dates are unknown, the date of publication is given instead. The highest percentage figure in each polling survey is displayed with its background shaded in the leading party's colour. If a tie ensues, this is applied to the figures with the highest percentages. The "Lead" column on the right shows the percentage-point difference between the parties with the highest percentages in a poll.

=== Voting intention estimates ===
The table below lists weighted voting intention estimates. Refusals are generally excluded from the party vote percentages, while question wording and the treatment of "don't know" responses and those not intending to vote may vary between polling organisations. When available, seat projections determined by the polling organisations are displayed below (or in place of) the percentages in a smaller font; 17 seats were required for an absolute majority in the City Council of Valencia.

Color key:

Exit poll

Polling firm/Commissioner	Fieldwork date	Sample size	Turnout	PP	PSPV	EUPV	Compromís	UPyD	Lead
2011 municipal election	22 May 2011	—N/a	69.4	52.5; 20	21.8; 8	7.2; 2	9.0; 3	2.8; 0	30.7
Ipsos–Eco/FORTA	22 May 2011	?	?	49.9; 22/23	26.3; 11/12	7.2; 2/3	7.8; 3/4	–	23.6
Ikerfel/Vocento	15 May 2011	800	?	54.6; 20/21	33.9; 12/13	–	–	–	20.7
TNS Demoscopia/Antena 3	4 May 2011	?	?	55.5; 21	27.1; 10	7.0; 2	3.3; 0	2.7; 0	28.4
Sigma Dos/El Mundo	15–19 Apr 2011	400	?	57.3; 21	28.8; 10/11	5.3; 1/2	–	–	28.5
CIS	17 Mar–17 Apr 2011	494	?	53.4; 21	27.0; 10	6.6; 2	3.1; 0	3.2; 0	26.4
PP	25 Feb 2011	?	?	? 22	? 9	? 2	–	–	?
2009 EP election	7 Jun 2009	—N/a	55.8	53.8 (20)	34.5 (13)	3.5 (0)	0.5 (0)	3.3 (0)	19.3
2008 general election	9 Mar 2008	—N/a	79.5	53.5 (19)	38.1 (14)	3.2 (0)	0.8 (0)	1.2 (0)	15.4
2007 municipal election	27 May 2007	—N/a	68.4	56.7; 21	33.8; 12	4.8; 0	–	–	22.9

=== Voting preferences ===
The table below lists raw, unweighted voting preferences.

Polling firm/Commissioner	Fieldwork date	Sample size	PP	PSPV	EUPV	Compromís	UPyD	Question	X mark	Lead
2011 municipal election	22 May 2011	—N/a	36.0	14.9	4.9	6.2	1.9	—N/a	30.6	21.1
CIS	17 Mar–17 Apr 2011	494	41.3	16.0	4.3	2.2	2.4	19.3	8.3	25.3
2009 EP election (Note: Does not include non-resident citizens.)	7 Jun 2009	—N/a	29.9	19.2	1.9	0.3	1.8	—N/a	44.2	10.7
2008 general election	9 Mar 2008	—N/a	42.2	30.1	2.5	0.6	0.9	—N/a	20.5	12.1
2007 municipal election	27 May 2007	—N/a	38.6	23.0	3.3	–	–	—N/a	31.6	22.9

=== Preferred Mayor ===
The table below lists opinion polling on leader preferences to become mayor of Valencia.

Polling firm/Commissioner	Fieldwork date	Sample size						Other/ None/ Not care	Question	Lead
Polling firm/Commissioner	Fieldwork date	Sample size	Barberá PP	Calabuig PSPV	Sanchis EUPV	Ribó Compromís	Igual UPyD	Other/ None/ Not care	Question	Lead
CIS	17 Mar–17 Apr 2011	494	50.4	14.2	0.4	5.3	1.4	5.9	22.4	36.2

== Results ==
← Summary of the 22 May 2011 City Council of Valencia election results →
Parties and alliances	Popular vote			Seats	
Parties and alliances	Votes	%	±pp	Total	+/−
People's Party (PP)	208,727	52.54	−4.13	20	−1
Socialist Party of the Valencian Country (PSPV–PSOE)	86,440	21.76	−12.02	8	−4
Commitment to Valencia: Commitment Municipal Coalition (Compromís)	35,881	9.03	New	3	+3
United Left of the Valencian Country (EUPV)	28,489	7.17	+2.40	2	+2
Union, Progress and Democracy (UPyD)	11,243	2.83	New	0	±0
Greens and Eco-pacifists (VyE)	5,177	1.30	New	0	±0
Valencian Coalition (CVa)	2,219	0.56	−0.79	0	±0
Spain 2000 (E–2000)	1,920	0.48	+0.29	0	±0
Anti-Bullfighting Party Against Mistreatment of Animals (PACMA)	1,771	0.45	New	0	±0
Republican Left of the Valencian Country–Municipal Agreement (ERPV–AM)	980	0.25	−0.01	0	±0
For a Fairer World (PUM+J)	752	0.19	+0.03	0	±0
United for Valencia (UxV)	690	0.17	+0.08	0	±0
Family and Life Party (PFyV)	511	0.13	New	0	±0
Humanist Party (PH)	488	0.12	+0.07	0	±0
Liberal Democratic Centre (CDL)	482	0.12	New	0	±0
Communist Party of the Peoples of Spain (PCPE)	443	0.11	+0.02	0	±0
Party of the Elderly and the Self-employed (PdMA)	387	0.10	New	0	±0
National Democracy (DN)	343	0.09	+0.03	0	±0
Foreigners' Party (PdEx)	314	0.08	New	0	±0
Communist Unification of Spain (UCE)	295	0.07	New	0	±0
SOS Democracy (SOSDM)	277	0.07	New	0	±0
Valencian Nationalist Left–European Valencianist Party (ENV–RV–PVE)	275	0.07	New	0	±0
The Republic (La República)	271	0.07	New	0	±0
Authentic Phalanx (FA)	220	0.06	New	0	±0
Blank ballots	8,661	2.18	+0.82		
Total	397,256			33	±0
Valid votes	397,256	98.72	−0.84		
Invalid votes	5,144	1.28	+0.84		
Votes cast / turnout	402,400	69.41	+0.99		
Abstentions	177,333	30.59	−0.99		
Registered voters	579,733				

Popular vote
PP	52.54%
PSPV–PSOE	21.76%
Compromís	9.03%
EUPV	7.17%
UPyD	2.83%
VyE	1.30%
Others	3.18%
Blank ballots	2.18%

Seats
PP	60.61%
PSPV–PSOE	24.24%
Compromís	9.09%
EUPV	6.06%

== Aftermath ==
=== Government formation ===
Investiture
Ballot →	11 June 2011	
Required majority →	17 out of 33	
Rita Barberá (PP): • PP (20)	20 / 33	check
Joan Calabuig (PSPV): • PSPV (8)	8 / 33	X mark
Joan Ribó (Compromís): • Compromís (3)	3 / 33	X mark
Amadeu Sanchis (EUPV): • EUPV (2)	2 / 33	X mark
Abstentions/Blank ballots	0 / 33	
Absentees	0 / 33	

== Bibliography ==
- Constitución Española (Constitution). Official State Gazette (in Spanish). 27 December 1978 [version as of 28 August 1992]. BOE-A-1978-31229.
- Ley 7/1985, de 2 de abril, Reguladora de las Bases del Régimen Local (Law 7/1985). Official State Gazette (in Spanish). 2 April 1985 [version as of 5 March 2011]. BOE-A-1985-5392.
- Ley Orgánica 5/1985, de 19 de junio, del Régimen Electoral General (Organic Law 5/1985). Official State Gazette (in Spanish). 19 June 1985 [version as of 30 April 2011]. BOE-A-1985-11672.
- Real Decreto 424/2011, de 28 de marzo, por el que se convocan elecciones locales y a las Asambleas de Ceuta y Melilla para el 22 de mayo de 2011 (Royal Decree 424/2011). Official State Gazette (in Spanish). 28 March 2011. BOE-A-2011-5608.
