= Clementina Ródenas =

Spanish politician

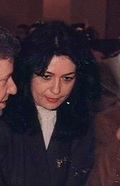

Mayor of Valencia
- In office 13 January 1989 – 5 July 1991
- Preceded by: Ricard Pérez Casado
- Succeeded by: Rita Barberá

Personal details
- Born: 11 May 1949 Ayora, Spain
- Party: PSOE

Clementina Ródenas Villena (born 11 May 1949) is a Spanish politician from the Spanish Socialist Workers' Party (PSOE) who was Mayor of Valencia between 1989 and 1991.

Clementina Ródenas studied the Bachillerato at the Requena Institute and then went on to study Economics and Business Administration at the University of Valencia in 1966 and to obtain a doctorate in Economics in 1978, making her the first woman to obtain a doctorate at that university. By competitive examination she became a full professor of Economic History in 1979.

In 1975 she joined the Partit Socialista del País Valencià and the Unión General de Trabajadores, being a member of the PSPV-PSOE accounts committee (the result of the integration of the PSPV into the PSOE in 1978) from 1979 to 1985. Between 1983 and 1989 she was a councillor for the Treasury and the first deputy mayor on Valencia City Council, in the municipal team presided over by her party colleague Ricard Pérez Casado. After the latter resigned at the end of 1988, she was elected mayor, with only one vote difference over regionalist Vicente González Lizondo (Ródenas obtained 14 votes against 13 for Valencian Union and the People's Alliance; CDS and Esquerra Unida abstained). Ródenas was the socialist candidate in the 1991 municipal elections, winning with 45,000 votes difference over her most direct rival, Rita Barberá of the Partido Popular. However, she did not obtain an absolute majority (she won 13 of the 33 councillors) and, thanks to the pacts between the Partido Popular and Valencian Union, Barberá was elected mayor. During the 1991-1995 term of office, Ródenas was head of the municipal opposition on Valencia City Council and president of the Valencia Provincial Council. She was also the representative of the Spanish Federation of Municipalities and Provinces in the Council of European Regions.

At the 7th Congress of the PSPV-PSOE (April 1994), Ródenas was elected a member of the Executive Committee.
