= 1995 Valencia municipal election =

Election in the Spanish municipality of Valencia

- 28 May 1995

All 33 seats in the City Council of Valencia 17 seats needed for a majority
- Opinion polls
- Registered: 627,784 ▲6.1%
- Turnout: 458,649 (73.1%) ▲9.7 pp
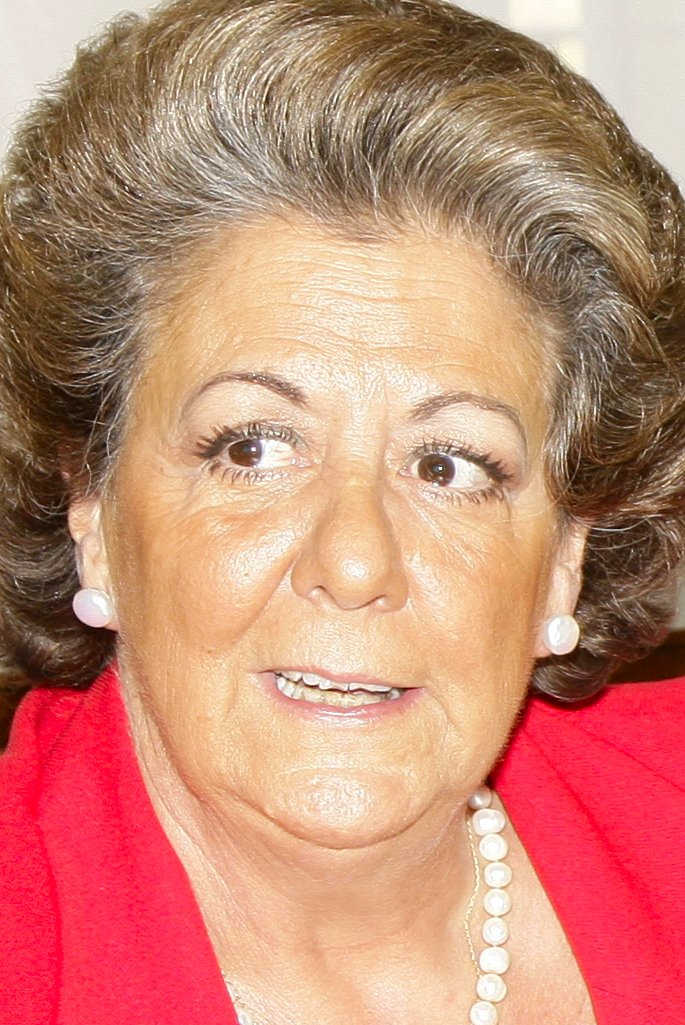

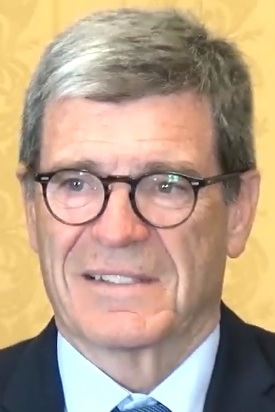

	First party	Second party	Third party
Leader	Rita Barberá	Aurelio Martínez	Manuel Moret
Party	PP	PSOE	EU–EV
Leader since	1991	25 January 1995	1991
Last election	9 seats, 25.5%	13 seats, 37.3%	3 seats, 10.4% (Note: Results for EU (8.0%, 3 seats) and LV (2.4%, 0 seats) in the 1991 election.)
Seats won	17	8	5
Seat change	▲8	▼5	▲2
Popular vote	223,963	110,071	67,532
Percentage	49.0%	24.1%	14.8%
Swing	▲23.5 pp	▼13.2 pp	▲4.4 pp
	Fourth party
Leader	Juan Vicente Jurado
Party	UV–FICVA–CCV
Leader since	1995
Last election	8 seats, 21.6%
Seats won	3
Seat change	▼5
Popular vote	41,019
Percentage	9.0%
Swing	▼12.6 pp
Mayor before election
Rita Barberá
PP
Mayor after election
Rita Barberá
PP

A municipal election was held in Valencia on 28 May 1995 to elect the 5th City Council of the municipality. All 33 seats in the City Council were up for election. It was held concurrently with regional elections in thirteen autonomous communities and local elections all across Spain.

== Overview ==
Under the 1978 Constitution, the governance of municipalities in Spain—part of the country's local government system—was centered on the figure of city councils (Spanish: ayuntamientos), local corporations with independent legal personality composed of a mayor, a government council and an elected legislative assembly. The mayor was indirectly elected by the local assembly, requiring an absolute majority; otherwise, the candidate from the most-voted party automatically became mayor (ties were resolved by drawing lots). In the case of Valencia, the top-tier administrative and governing body was the City Council of Valencia.

=== Date ===
The term of local assemblies in Spain expired four years after the date of their previous election, with election day being fixed for the fourth Sunday of May every four years. The election decree was required to be issued no later than 54 days before the scheduled election date and published on the following day in the Official State Gazette (BOE). The previous local elections were held on 26 May 1991, setting the date for election day on the fourth Sunday of May four years later, which was 28 May 1995.

Local assemblies could not be dissolved before the expiration of their term, except in cases of mismanagement that seriously harmed the public interest and implied a breach of constitutional obligations, in which case the Council of Ministers could—optionally—decide to call a by-election.

Elections to the assemblies of local entities were officially called on 4 April 1995 with the publication of the corresponding decree in the BOE, setting election day for 28 May.

=== Electoral system ===
Voting for local assemblies was based on universal suffrage, comprising all Spanish nationals over 18 years of age, registered and residing in the municipality and with full political rights (provided that they had not been deprived of the right to vote by a final sentence, nor were legally incapacitated), as well as resident non-nationals whose country of origin allowed reciprocal voting by virtue of a treaty or within the framework of Community Law.

Local councillors were elected using the D'Hondt method and closed-list proportional voting, with a five percent-threshold of valid votes (including blank ballots) in each municipality. Each municipality was a multi-member constituency, with a number of seats based on the following scale:

Population	Councillors
<250	5
251–1,000	7
1,001–2,000	9
2,001–5,000	11
5,001–10,000	13
10,001–20,000	17
20,001–50,000	21
50,001–100,000	25
>100,001	+1 per each 100,000 inhabitants or fraction +1 if total is an even number

The law did not provide for by-elections to fill vacant seats; instead, any vacancies arising after the proclamation of candidates and during the legislative term were filled by the next candidates on the party lists or, when required, by designated substitutes.

== Parties and candidates ==
The electoral law allowed for parties and federations registered in the interior ministry, alliances and groupings of electors to present lists of candidates. Parties and federations intending to form an alliance were required to inform the relevant electoral commission within 10 days of the election call, whereas groupings of electors needed to secure the signature of a determined amount of the electors registered in the municipality for which they sought election, disallowing electors from signing for more than one list. In the case of Valencia, as its population was between 300,001 and 1,000,000, at least 5,000 signatures were required.

Below is a list of the main parties and alliances which contested the election:

Candidacy	Parties and alliances	Leading candidate	Ideology	Previous result		Gov.	Ref.
Candidacy	Parties and alliances	Leading candidate	Ideology	Vote %	Seats	Gov.	Ref.
PSOE	List: Spanish Socialist Workers' Party (PSOE)	Aurelio Martínez	Social democracy	37.3%	13	No	
PP	List: People's Party (PP)	Rita Barberá	Conservatism; Christian democracy	25.5%	9	Yes	
UV– FICVA– CCV	List: Valencian Union (UV); Independents' Federation of the Valencian Community (FICVA); Centrists of the Valencian Community (CCV)	Juan Vicente Jurado	Blaverism; Conservatism	21.6%	8	No	
EU–EV	List: United Left of the Valencian Country (EUPV) – Communist Party of the Valencian Country (PCPV) – Socialist Action Party (PASOC) – Republican Left (IR); The Greens (EV/LV)	Manuel Moret	Socialism; Communism	10.4%	3	No	

== Opinion polls ==
The tables below list opinion polling results in reverse chronological order, showing the most recent first and using the dates when the survey fieldwork was done, as opposed to the date of publication. Where the fieldwork dates are unknown, the date of publication is given instead. The highest percentage figure in each polling survey is displayed with its background shaded in the leading party's colour. If a tie ensues, this is applied to the figures with the highest percentages. The "Lead" column on the right shows the percentage-point difference between the parties with the highest percentages in a poll.

=== Voting intention estimates ===
The table below lists weighted voting intention estimates. Refusals are generally excluded from the party vote percentages, while question wording and the treatment of "don't know" responses and those not intending to vote may vary between polling organisations. When available, seat projections determined by the polling organisations are displayed below (or in place of) the percentages in a smaller font; 17 seats were required for an absolute majority in the City Council of Valencia.

Polling firm/Commissioner	Fieldwork date	Sample size	Turnout	PSOE	PP	UV	EU	Lead
1995 municipal election	28 May 1995	—N/a	73.1	24.1; 8	49.0; 17	9.0; 3	14.8; 5	24.9
Demoscopia/El País	10–15 May 1995	1,000	?	21.2; 8	45.0; 16	? 4	15.3; 5	23.8
CIS	24 Apr–10 May 1995	300	72.3	21.8	51.6	11.2	11.6	29.8
Sigma Dos/El Mundo	3–7 May 1995	500	?	21.2; 7	42.4; 15/16	? 5/6	15.2; 5	21.2
Gruppo/ABC	9–14 Feb 1995	400	?	23.3; 8	45.5; 16/17	10.3; 3	16.1; 5/6	22.2
1994 EP election	12 Jun 1994	—N/a	63.6	22.9 (8)	47.7 (17)	7.8 (2)	16.0 (6)	24.8
1993 general election	6 Jun 1993	—N/a	81.2	31.1 (11)	42.7 (15)	8.2 (3)	12.6 (4)	11.6
1991 municipal election	26 May 1991	—N/a	73.4	37.3; 13	25.5; 9	21.6; 8	8.0; 3	11.8

== Results ==
← Summary of the 28 May 1995 City Council of Valencia election results →
Parties and alliances	Popular vote			Seats	
Parties and alliances	Votes	%	±pp	Total	+/−
People's Party (PP)	223,963	49.00	+23.50	17	+8
Spanish Socialist Workers' Party (PSOE)	110,071	24.08	−13.22	8	−5
United Left–The Greens (EU–EV)^{1}	67,532	14.78	+4.38	5	+2
Valencian Union–Independents–Centrists (UV–FICVA–CCV)	41,019	8.97	−12.59	3	−5
Valencian People's Union–Nationalist Bloc (UPV–BN)	4,290	0.94	−0.66	0	±0
Democratic and Social Centre (CDS)	1,645	0.36	−1.72	0	±0
Valencianist Renewal (RV)	1,117	0.24	New	0	±0
Autonomist Republican Party (PRA)	618	0.14	New	0	±0
Valencian Nationalist Left (ENV)	481	0.11	New	0	±0
Platform of Independents of Spain (PIE)	391	0.09	New	0	±0
Humanist Platform (PH–LE)	346	0.08	New	0	±0
Spanish Autonomous League (LAE)	221	0.05	New	0	±0
Blank ballots	5,371	1.18	+0.19		
Total	457,065			33	±0
Valid votes	457,065	99.65	+0.08		
Invalid votes	1,584	0.35	−0.08		
Votes cast / turnout	458,649	73.06	+9.65		
Abstentions	169,135	26.94	−9.65		
Registered voters	627,784				
Sources
Footnotes: ^{1} United Left–The Greens results are compared to the combined totals of United Left of the Valencian Country and The Greens in the 1991 election.

Popular vote
PP	49.00%
PSOE	24.08%
EU–EV	14.78%
UV–FICVA–CCV	8.97%
Others	1.99%
Blank ballots	1.18%

Seats
PP	51.52%
PSOE	24.24%
EU–EV	15.15%
UV–FICVA–CCV	9.09%

== Aftermath ==
=== Government formation ===
Investiture
Ballot →	7 July 1995	
Required majority →	17 out of 33	
Rita Barberá (PP): • PP (17); • UV (3)	20 / 33	check
Aurelio Martínez (PSOE): • PSOE (8)	8 / 33	X mark
Manuel Moret (EUPV): • EUPV (5)	5 / 33	X mark
Abstentions/Blank ballots	0 / 33	
Absentees	0 / 33	

== Bibliography ==
- Constitución Española (Constitution). Official State Gazette (in Spanish). 27 December 1978 [version as of 28 August 1992]. BOE-A-1978-31229.
- Ley 7/1985, de 2 de abril, Reguladora de las Bases del Régimen Local (Law 7/1985). Official State Gazette (in Spanish). 2 April 1985 [version as of 31 December 1994]. BOE-A-1985-5392.
- Ley Orgánica 5/1985, de 19 de junio, del Régimen Electoral General (Organic Law 5/1985). Official State Gazette (in Spanish). 19 June 1985 [version as of 24 March 1995]. BOE-A-1985-11672.
- Real Decreto 489/1995, de 3 de abril, de convocatoria de elecciones locales y a las Asambleas de Ceuta y Melilla (Royal Decree 489/1995). Official State Gazette (in Spanish). 3 April 1995. BOE-A-1995-8132.
