= Fernando Martínez Castellano =

Spanish politician (1942–2024)

Fernando Martínez Castellano (1942 – 20 May 2024) was a Spanish politician who was a member of the Spanish Socialist Workers' Party (PSOE). He was the first democratically elected mayor of Valencia after the Francoist dictatorship, serving from April to October 1979. He was removed from office by his party after taking a position critical of its leadership. He did not run in any election again until 2007.

== Biography ==
=== Tenure as mayor ===
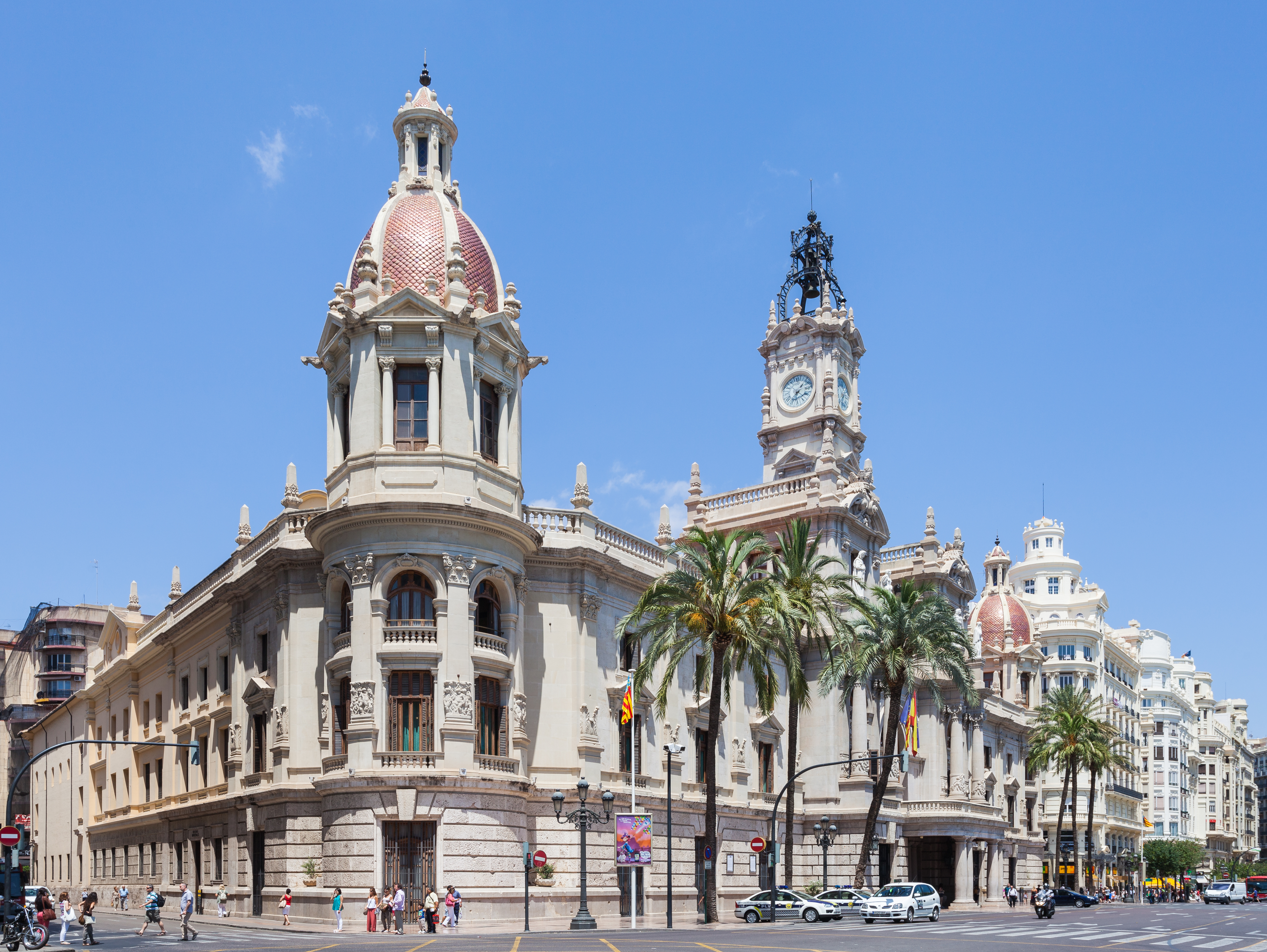
Martínez Castellano said that when he arrived at Valencia City Hall, the building was not fit for purpose and the council had debts.

Born in Valencia, Martínez Castellano joined the Spanish Socialist Workers' Party (PSOE) in 1976. He was the first democratically elected mayor of his home city in the 1979 Spanish local elections. He was sworn into office with the support of the 13 city councillors from his party and the six from the Communist Party of Spain (PCE), thus outvoting the 13 members of the Union of the Democratic Centre (UCD).

Martínez Castellano reflected in 2019 that when he arrived at the mayor's office, it only had a table with no drawers, an FC Bayern Munich pennant and a red sofa kept for sentimental reasons as Francisco Franco had once sat there. The city council had a deficit of 3 billion pesetas (€18 million) and outstanding bills since 1972. The new administration took possession of landmarks such as the Museo de la Ciudad de Valencia, and halted building projects in favour of green spaces. Martínez Castellano faced an attempted bombing of his home in his first week in office.

Days after taking office, Martínez Castellano was able to pass a two-thirds majority with support from the UCD to ask for a loan of 1.528 billion pesetas. On 11 June 1979, he hosted a meeting of the mayors of the 20 biggest cities, in which Narcís Serra of Barcelona advocated for financial reform to combat a shared debt that was forecast to reach 400 billion pesetas by the end of the year. The mayors met the prime minister of Spain Adolfo Suárez the next day.

=== Expulsion from the PSOE ===
In September 1979, Martínez Castellano attended the 28th PSOE congress, where he was part of the "critical" sector against leader Felipe González's proposal to remove Marxism from the party's ideology; González resigned as a result. Due to this position, Martínez Castellano was expelled from the Socialist Party of the Valencian Country (PSPV), resigned from office, and was replaced by the second name on the PSOE list for the election, Ricard Pérez Casado.

The PSOE attempted to dismiss Martínez Castellano from his seat on the city council. The matter went to the Constitutional Court, which found in Martínez Castellano's favour. The case set the precedent that political mandates belong to the elected individuals, and not to political parties.

=== Later life and death ===
Martínez Castellano returned to politics for the 2007 Valencia City Council election with the Social Democratic Party. Initially the lead candidate, he was finally listed as second. He was also a columnist for the local newspaper Las Provincias.

Martínez Castellano died on 20 May 2024, aged 82. Valencia City Council declared three days of mourning.
