= Vicente González Lizondo =

Spanish politician (1942–1996)

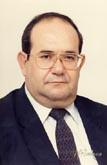
Vicente González Lizondo

Vicente González Lizondo (22 August 1942 in Casas-Ibáñez – 23 December 1996) was a Spanish politician and co-founder of the regional party Valencian Union (Unió Valenciana).

== Early life ==
Married with four children, González was a businessman and the owner of a factory which made paintbrushes.

His early political involvement was as a member of the Valencian Regional Union (Unio Regional Valencianista/URV), a political party formed after the Spanish General Election of 1977. Politically he was conservative and strongly anti-Catalan, opposing those who favoured a pan-Catalan approach which would link the Valencian Community with Catalunya and other Catalan speaking areas Consequently, on 30 August 1982 he joined other members of URV in forming the Valencian Union (UV) becoming President for Valencia Province.

== Political career ==
=== Mayoral candidate ===
In May 1983 he was elected to Valencia City Council at the head of the UV list and set his sights on becoming Mayor of Valencia. When the Spanish Socialist Workers' Party (PSOE) Mayor Ricard Pérez Casado resigned in January 1989 he stood but lost to PSOE candidate Clementina Ródenas by 13 votes to 14.

In 1991 he again ran for Mayor and again narrowly lost to Rita Barbera Nolla of the People's Party (PP)

=== National MP and President of the Valencian Corts ===
Six years later in 1989 he headed the UV list in the 1989 General Election and was elected to the national parliament as a deputy for Valencia province. He was re-elected at the 1993 General Election however UV lost one of their two seats at that election. One year later, in October 1994, he resigned his parliamentary seat and was replaced by his party colleague José María Chiquillo Barber.

In 1995 he was elected to the Corts Valencianes, the Valencian regional parliament and was elected President of the Corts as a result of a pact formed between UV and the larger PP.

=== Expulsion from UV and death ===
He was expelled from UV on 30 November 1996 and three weeks later collapsed of a heart attack during a parliamentary session which was discussing the creation of the Miguel Hernández University of Elche. This proved fatal as he died several days later. González had previously suffered two heart attacks and doctors speculated that the stress of the events surrounding his expulsion from the party may have led to his fatal heart attack. Another possible factor cited was the lengthy parliamentary session that he had presided over.

== Vicente González-Lizondo y Sánchez ==
Following his death, his son, Vicente González-Lizondo y Sánchez, (Valencia, 17 June 1975) entered Valencian politics as a member of UV rising to become Party President in Valencia Province. UV's results had continued to decline in this period and they had lost their representation in both the Corts Valencianes and Valencia city council in 1999 and in the national parliament in 2000.

In May 2007 he stood as the party's candidate for Mayor of Valencia but following further poor results the entire leadership of the party in Valencia Province resigned in protest at the actions of the Party's National President, José Manuel Miralles. This led to speculation that the resignations could spell the beginning of the end for UV as a party.
