= Carmen Alborch =

Spanish politician and writer

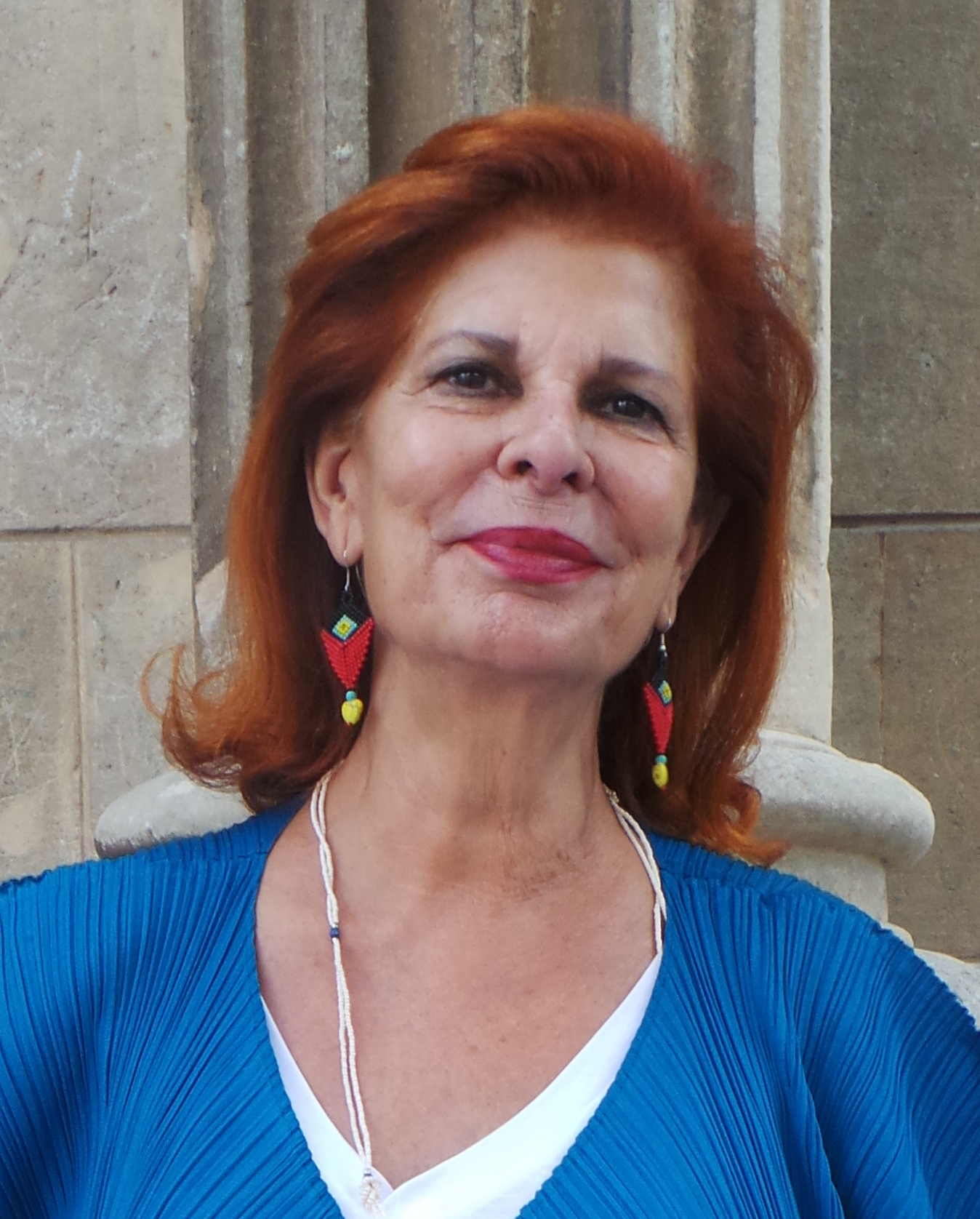

Minister of Culture
- In office 14 July 1993 – 4 May 1996
- Monarch: Juan Carlos I
- Prime Minister: Felipe González
- Preceded by: Jordi Solé Tura
- Succeeded by: Esperanza Aguirre

Personal details
- Born: Carmen Alborch Bataller; 31 October 1947 Castelló de Rugat, Valencia, Spain
- Died: 24 October 2018 (aged 70) Valencia, Spain
- Party: Spanish Socialist Workers' Party
- Education: University of Valencia

Carmen Alborch Bataller (31 October 1947 – 24 October 2018) was a Spanish politician, writer, and minister of culture.

== Biography and career ==
Alborch gained a doctorate in law with particular specialty in mercantile law. She directed the Valencia Institute of Modern Art (IVAM) between 1988 and 1993. She became politically active with the Spanish Socialist Workers' Party (PSOE) in 1992 and served as Minister of Culture from 1993 to 1996 in the last government of Felipe González. She was the recipient of the Gran Cruz de Carlos III and the Gran Cruz del Mérito Civil, and the Progressive Women's Award.

In 1996, Alborch was elected to the Congress of Deputies, representing Valencia. She chaired the Committee of Control of RTVE (the state radio and TV corporation) from 1996 until January 2000, and the Commission on Women's Rights and Equal Opportunities from May 2004 to January 2008 in the Congress. She authored books including Solas (Women Alone) and Malas (Bad Women).

In addition to numerous television appearances as a politician, Alborch also played minor roles in the Spanish television series El círculo a primera hora, El primer café, and Los desayunos de TVE.

In May 2007, she stood as the PSOE candidate for Mayor of Valencia but lost to the incumbent People's Party Mayor Rita Barberá. She retired from the lower chamber at the 2008 general election in order to be elected to the Spanish Senate, once again representing Valencia until 2016.

Alborch died on 24 October 2018 from cancer, aged 70.
