= Valencia City Hall =

Seat of the local government of Valencia, Spain

Coordinates: 39.4698°N 0.3773°W

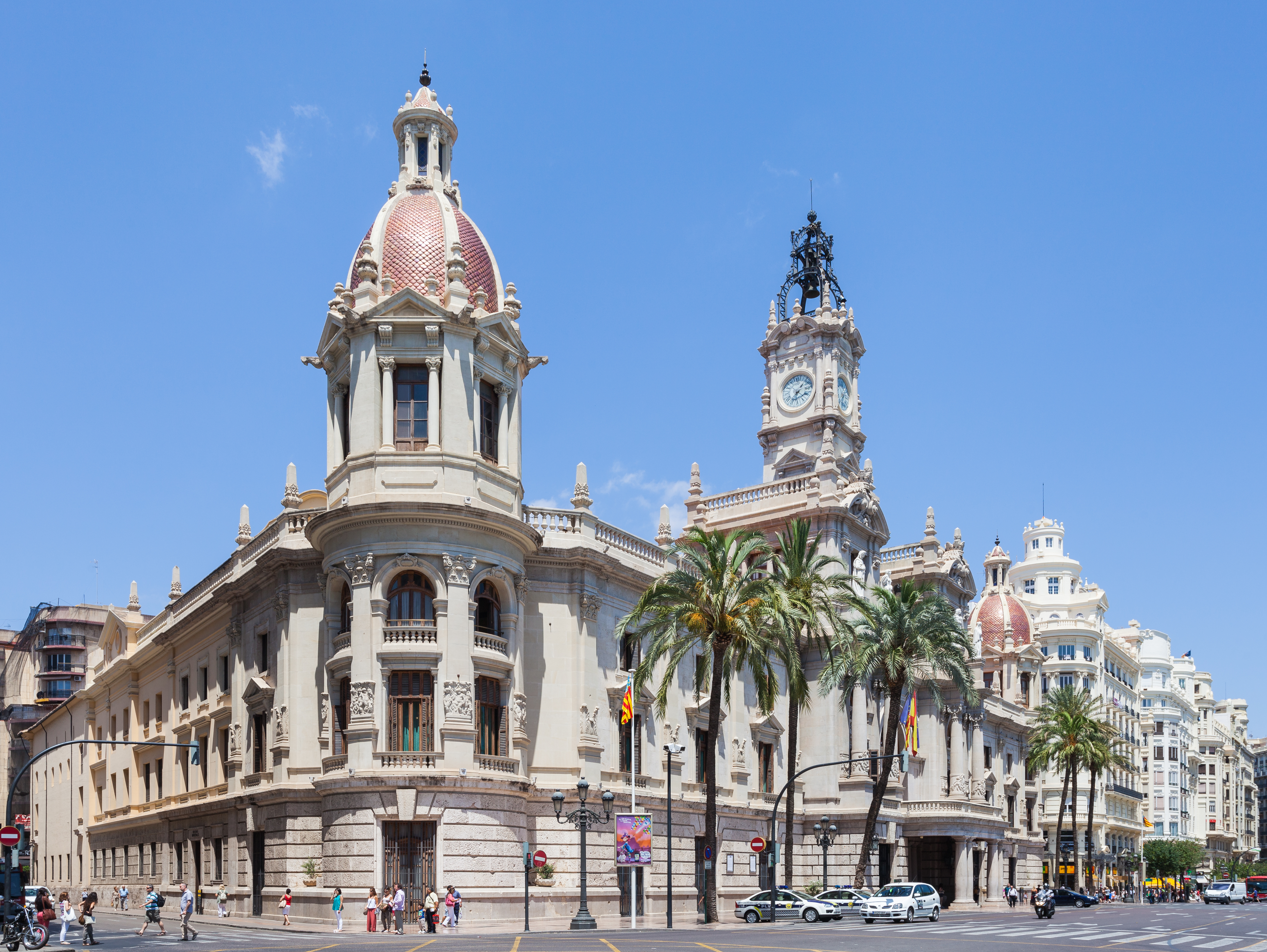

Valencia City Hall (Spanish: Casa consistorial de Valencia; Valencian: Palau consistorial de València) is the seat of City Council of Valencia, Spain. It was declared a Bien de Interés Cultural in 1962.

The structure is made of two buildings which were constructed at different times: a school building and then the new façade. The building also includes the Municipal History Museum. The museum was opened in what was a chapel of the school building in 1927, and includes the Room of the Fueros, where Ramón Stolz Viciano^{in ES} painted eight medieval monarchs in 1956, starting with the city's conqueror James II of Aragon.

From November 1936 to October 1937, the city hall shared its chamber with the Cortes Generales of the Second Spanish Republic, during the early stages of the Spanish Civil War. On 28 May 1937, it was bombed by the Italian Air Force in service of the Nationalist faction, causing 2 million Spanish pesetas in damage. During the war, to protect the children educated at the city hall, an underground bomb shelter was added with capacity for 700 people.

== Gallery ==
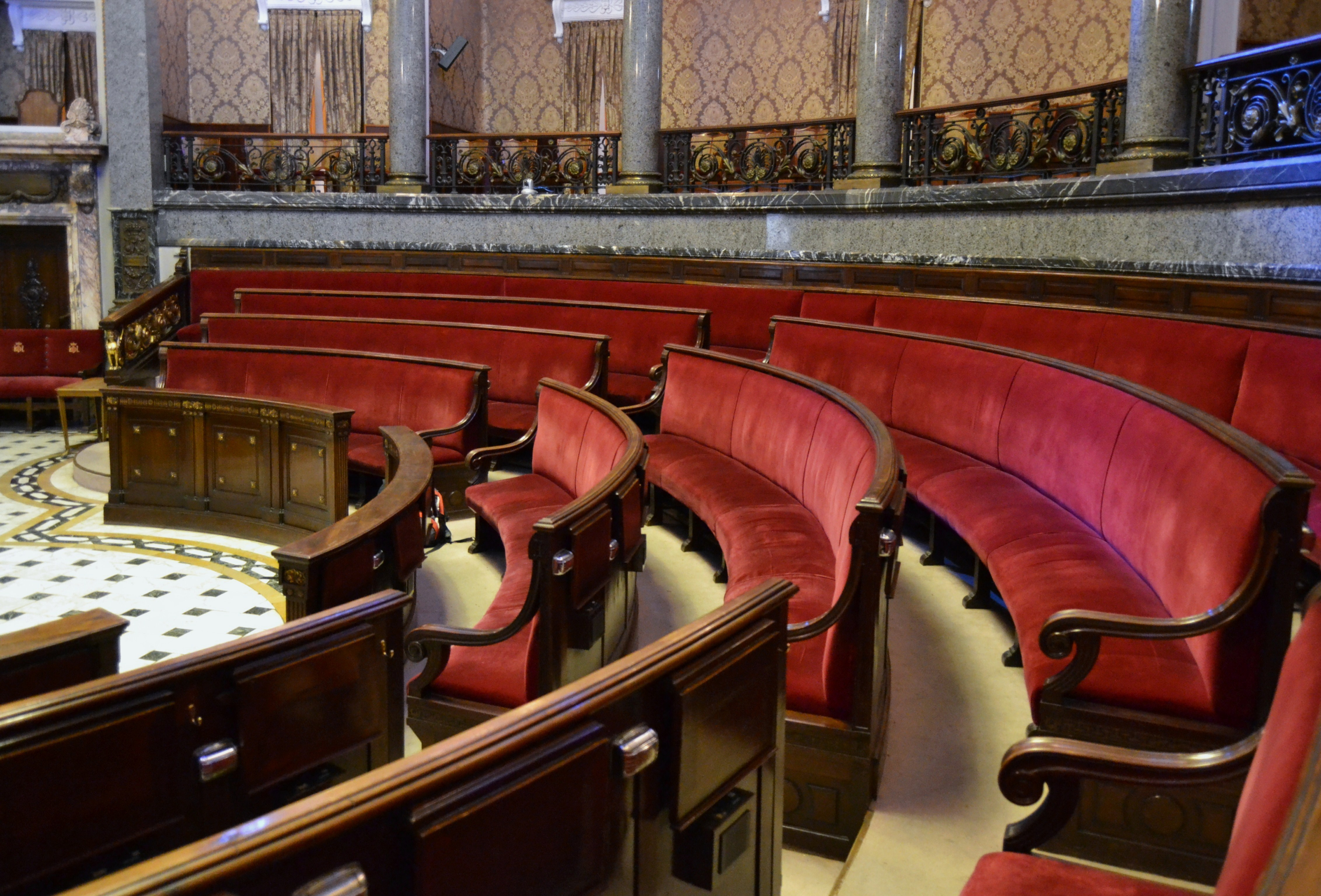
Debating chamber

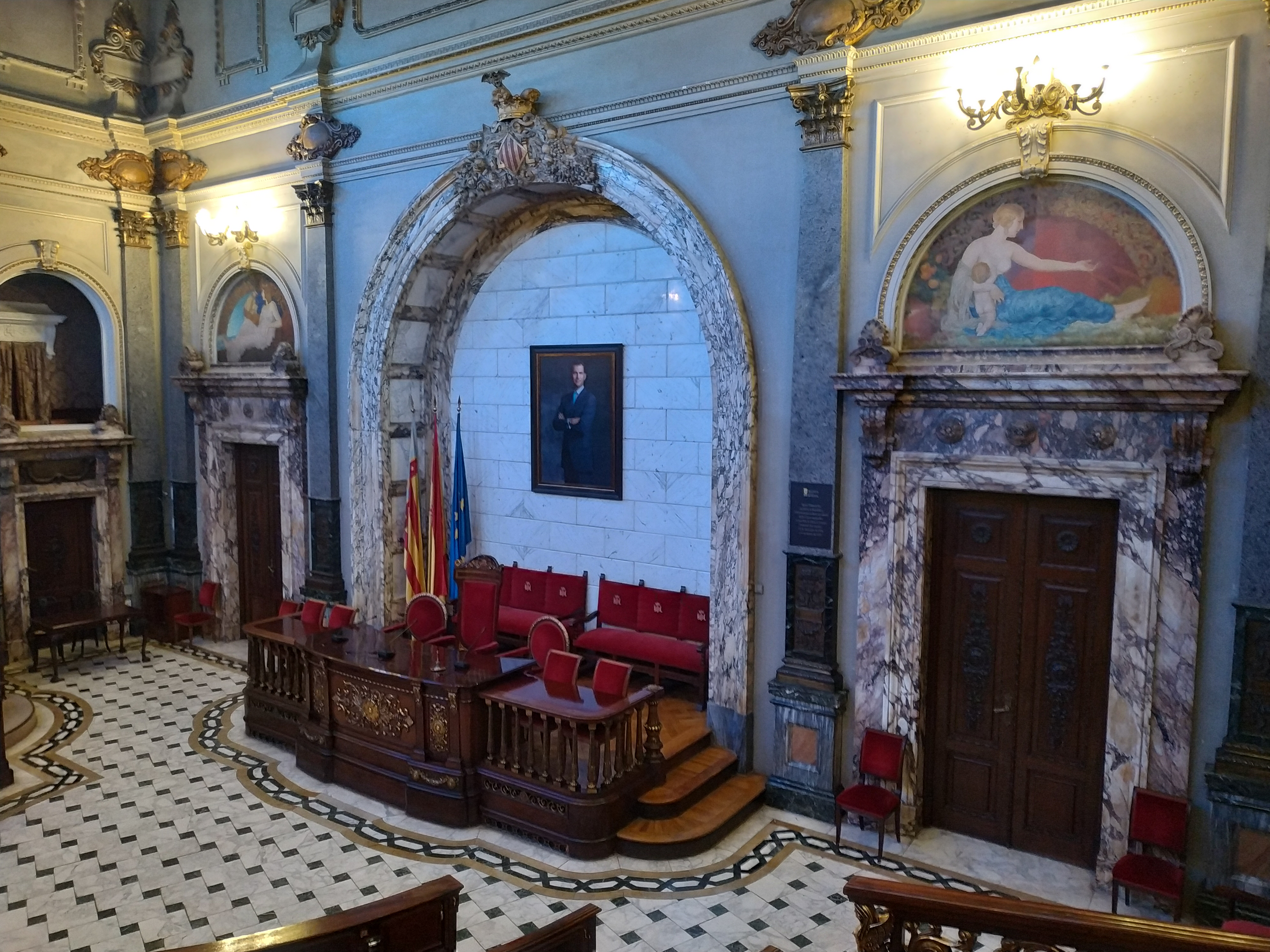
Speakers' seats

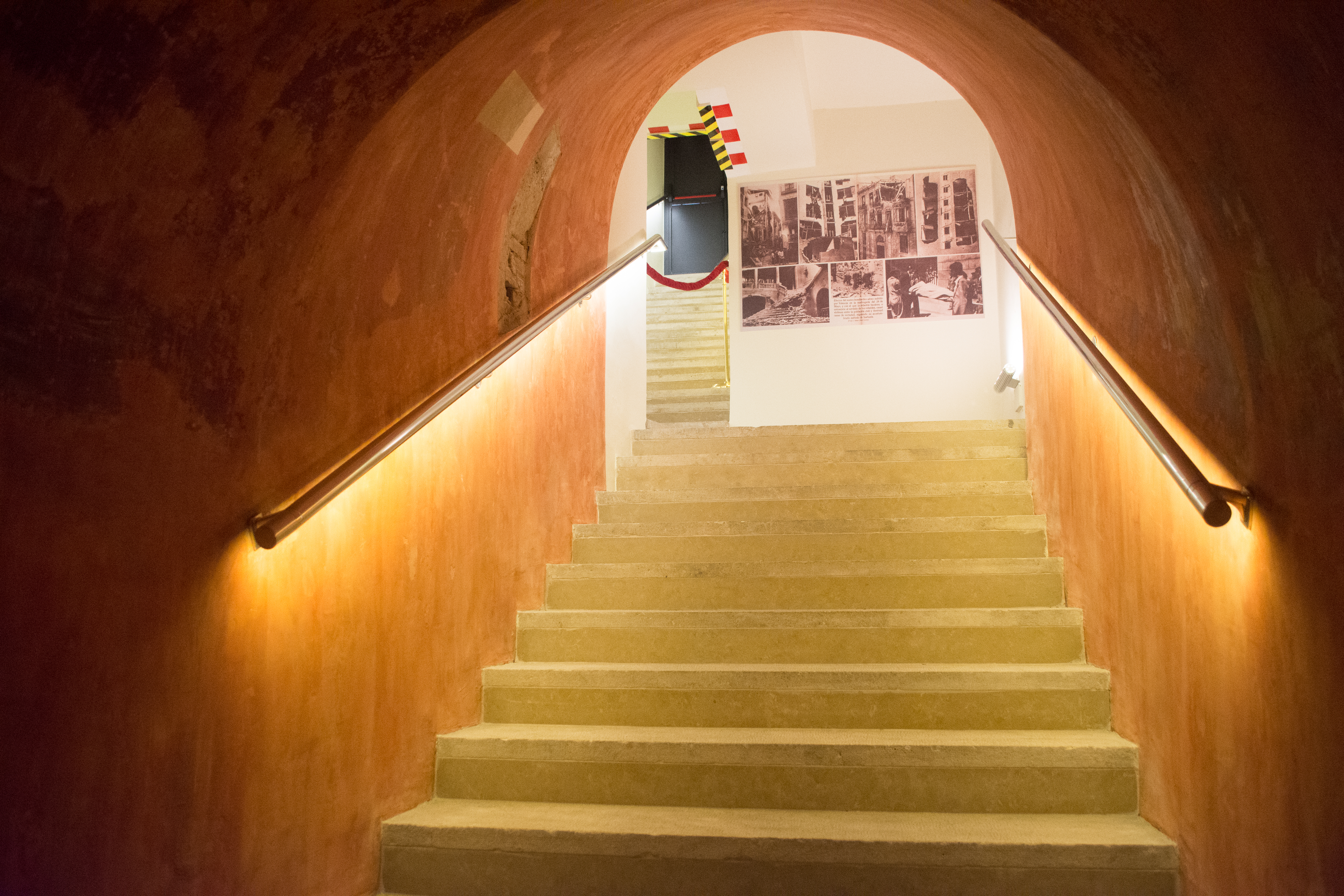
Civil War air raid shelter
