= City Council of Valencia =

Governing body for Valencia, Spain

City Council of Valencia Ajuntament de València

Type
- Type: Unicameral house of the Ayuntamiento of Valencia

Leadership
- Mayor: María José Catalá, PP since 28 May 2023

Structure
- Political groups: Government (17): PP (13); Vox (4); Opposition (16): Compromís (9); PSPV–PSOE (7)
- Length of term: 4 years

Elections
- Last election: 28 May 2023
- Next election: 23 May 2027

Meeting place
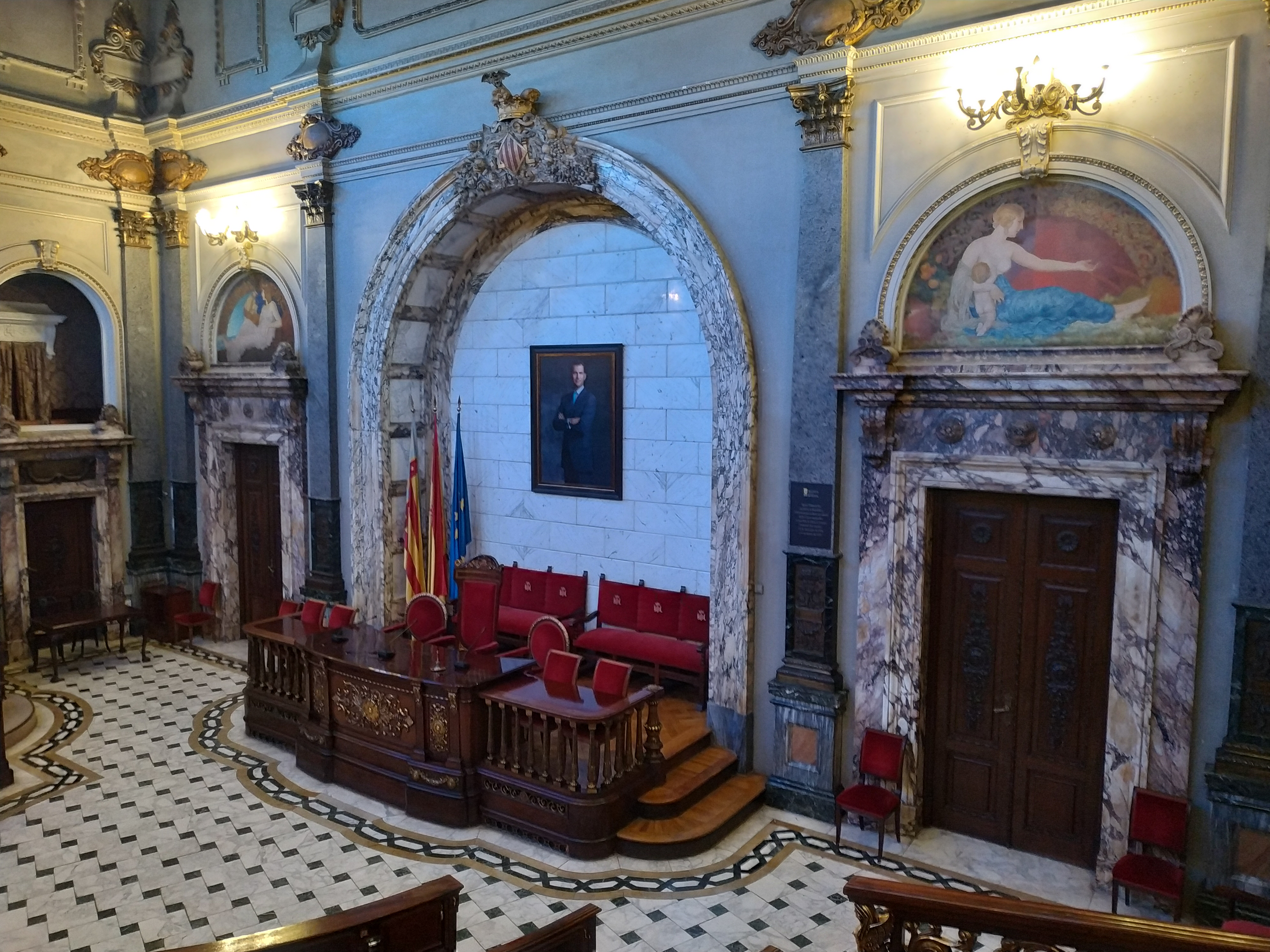
- Valencia City Hall

Website
- www.valencia.es

The City Council of Valencia (Valencian: Ajuntament de València, Spanish: Ayuntamiento de Valencia), is the institution that is responsible for governing the city and municipality of Valencia (Spain). It is called in Valencian: Ajuntament de València or Spanish: Ayuntamiento de Valencia. It is presided over by the mayor of Valencia, who since 1979 has been democratically elected by universal suffrage. Since 2023, the position is held by María José Catalá, of the People's Party. The institution is located and holds formal meetings in the Valencia City Hall or in Valencian: Palau consistorial de València and in Spanish: Casa Consistorial de Valencia. The building is also often called the Ayuntamiento by metonymy.

== Operation ==
The City Council is the group of political representation of citizens in the municipal government. It directly assumes the representation of the community and determines actions on the issues confronting the city.

The councilors of the City of Valencia are chosen by universal suffrage in elections held every four years. The D'Hondt system is the mathematical algorithm used in Spain to distribute the councilors of the city councils in proportion to the votes obtained by each candidacy.

== History ==
Since the recovery of democracy in Spain, nine municipal elections have been held, and the city has been governed by three political parties, the PSOE, the PP and Compromís.^{en ES} From the first municipal elections in 1979 until 1991, the PSOE governed the city. During these years there were three mayors, Fernando Martínez Castellano (1979), Ricard Pérez Casado (1979-1988), and Clementina Ródenas Villena (1988-1991). While from 1991 to 2015, the PP has governed the city under the leadership of mayor Rita Barberá Nolla. From the elections of May 2015 and until the elections of 2023, Joan Ribó of Compromís held the mayor's office, with the support of the PSPV in the two legislatures of his mandate and València en Comú^{in ES} during the first. Since the municipal elections of May 2023, María José Catalá of the People's Party of the Valencian Community is the mayor of the city but avoided a formal coalition with Vox, opting for governing in minority with specific pacts.

=== Investiture agreements or government coalitions ===
Since 1979, the political parties represented in the City Council have reached six occasions to form government through coalition when none of them reached an absolute majority of seats located in 17 councilors. The parties that agreed to obtain the government of the city after the elections and the number of representatives they added is indicated in the following table:

Mandate	Parties	Councilors
1979-1983	PSOE+PCPV	19 / 33 (58%)
1987-1991	PSOE+IU/UPV	15 / 33 (45%)
1995-1999	PP+UV	17 / 33 (52%)
2015-2019	Compromís+PSPV-PSOE+VeC	17 / 33 (52%)
2019-2023	Compromís+PSPV|PSPV-PSOE	17 / 33 (52%)
2023-2027	PP+Vox	17 / 33 (52%)

=== Mayoralty or Alcaldía ===
After the 1979 Spanish local elections, the Ayuntamiento of Valencia was led by these mayors:

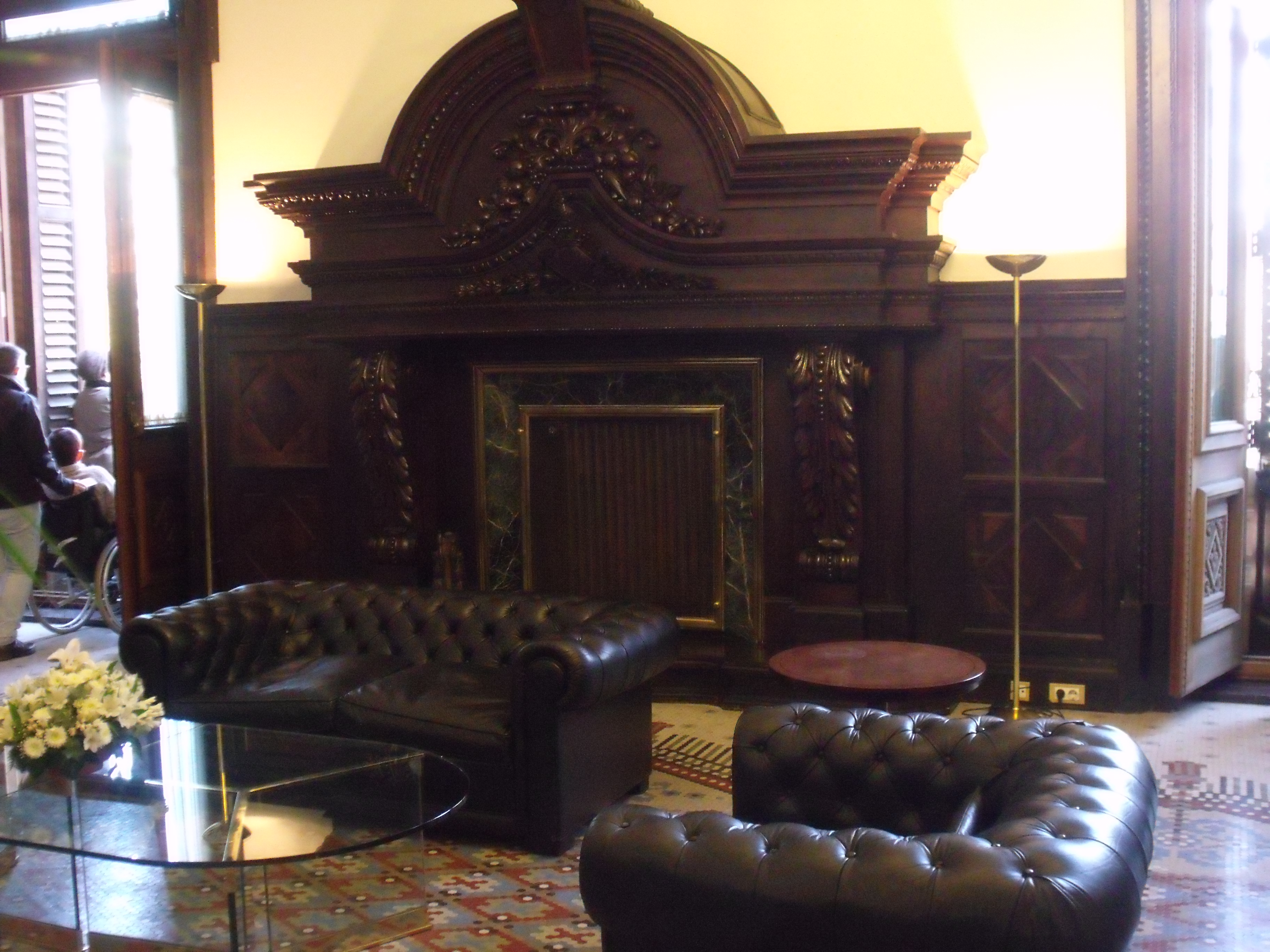
Office of the mayor of Valencia

Mayor	Start of Term	End of Term	Political Party
For mayors from 1840 to 1979 see this list.
Fernando Martínez Castellano	1979	1979	PSPV-PSOE
Ricard Pérez Casado	1979	1988	PSPV-PSOE
Clementina Ródenas Villena	1988	1991	PSPV-PSOE
Rita Barberá Nolla	1991	2015	Partido Popular
Joan Ribó i Canut	2015	2023	Compromís^{in ES}
María José Catalá Verdet	2023	En el cargo	Partido Popular

== Composition of the Ayuntamiento ==
=== Council of the Ayuntamiento ===
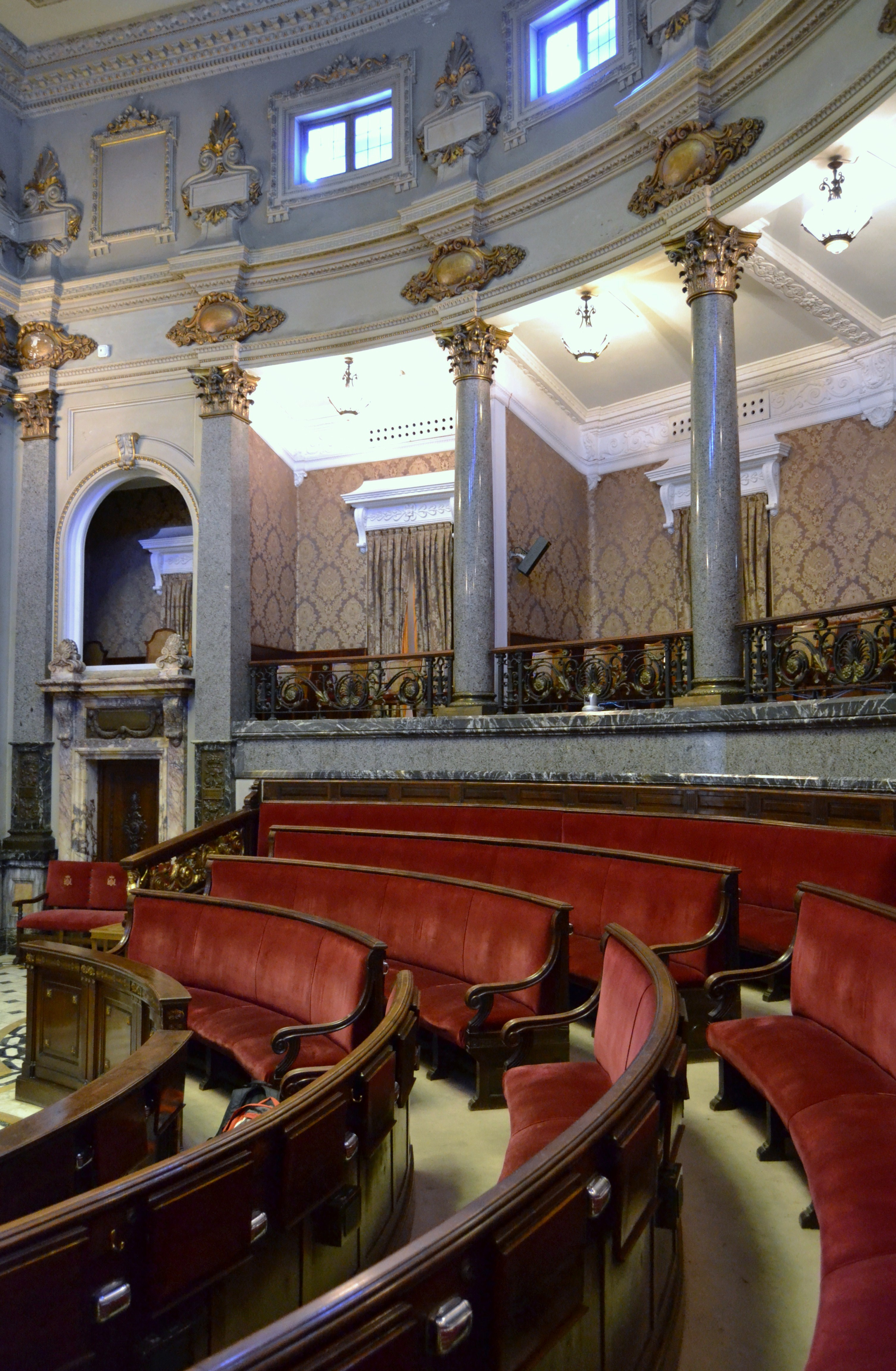
View of the Salón de Plenos or the Council Chamber

For the City Council of 2023-2027, The municipal corporation is made up of 33 councilors.

Political Party	Councilor	Portfolio
Partido Popular	María José Catalá Verdet	Mayor
Partido Popular	María José Ferrer San Segundo^{in ES}	First Deputy Mayor
Partido Popular	Julia Climent Monzó	Third Deputy Mayor
Partido Popular	Juan Manuel Giner Corell	Fourth Deputy Mayor
Partido Popular	Juan Carlos Caballero Montañés^{in ES}	Councilor and Spokesperson for the Ayuntamiento and the Municipal PP
Partido Popular	Paula María Llobet Vilarrasa	Fifth Deputy Mayor
Partido Popular	Santiago Ballester Casabuena	Sixth Deputy Mayor
Partido Popular	Jesús Carbonell Aguilar	Seventh Deputy Mayor
Partido Popular	José Marí Olano	Councilor
Partido Popular	José Luis Moreno Maicas	Councilor
Partido Popular	Carlos Luis Mundina Gómez	Councilor
Partido Popular	Marta Torrado de Castro	Councilor
Partido Popular	María del Rocío Gil Uncio	Councilor
Compromís:Acord per Guanyar^{in ES}	Carmen Luisa (Papi) Robles Galindo	Councilor and Municipal Spokesperson for Compromís
Compromís:Acord per Guanyar^{in ES}	Gloria Amparo Tello Company	Councilor
Compromís:Acord per Guanyar^{in ES}	Pere Sixte Fuset i Tortosa^{in ES}	Councilor
Compromís:Acord per Guanyar^{in ES}	Sergi Campillo Fernández	Councilor
Compromís:Acord per Guanyar^{in ES}	Lucía Beamud Villanueva	ConcCouncilorejala
Compromís:Acord per Guanyar^{in ES}	Giuseppe Grezzi^{in ES}	Councilor
Compromís:Acord per Guanyar^{in ES}	Ferran Puchades Vila	Councilor
Compromís:Acord per Guanyar^{in ES}	Eva Coscollà Grau	Councilor
Compromís:Acord per Guanyar^{in ES}	Lluïsa Notario Villanueva	Councilor
PSPV-PSOE	Borja Jesús Sanjuán Roca	Councilor and Municipal Spokesperson for PSPV-PSOE
PSPV-PSOE	María Teresa Ibáñez Giménez	Councilor
PSPV-PSOE	Nuria Llopis Borrego	Councilor
PSPV-PSOE	Javier Ismael Mateo García	Councilor
PSPV-PSOE	Elisa Valía Cotanda	Councilor
PSPV-PSOE	Dolors López	Councilor
PSPV-PSOE	Borja Santamaría Herrero	Councilor
Vox	Juan Manuel Bádenas Carpio	Second Deputy Mayor and Municipal Spokesperson for Vox
Vox	José Vicente Gosálbez Payá	Councilor
Vox	Mónica Gil Cano	Councilor
Vox	Cecilia Carmen Herrero Camilleri	Councilor

Elected Councilors who have left office

Councilor	Party	Date Resigned	Replaced by	Inauguration
Joan Ribó Canut	Compromís:Acord per Guanyar	27 March 2024	Lluïsa Notario Villanueva	30 April 2024
Sandra Gómez López	PSPV-PSOE	12 July 2024	Borja Santamaría Herrero	23 July 2024

=== Local Government Board ===
The Local Government Board is a group that collaborates with the mayor on the executive and administrative functions of the city government. As president of the Local Government Board, the mayor appoints the other members, whose number cannot exceed 11, not including the president, which is one third of the 33 seats on the City Council. For the 2023-2027 legislature, the Local Government Board includes two members of Vox as part of the alliance.

Member	Party	Primary Portfolio
María José Catalá Verdet	PP	Mayor-President
María José Ferrer San Segundo	PP	First Deputy Mayor
Juan Manuel Bádenas Carpio	Vox	Second Deputy Mayor
Julia Climent Monzó	PP	Third Deputy Mayor
Juan Manuel Giner Corell	PP	Fourth Deputy Mayor
Juan Carlos Caballero Montañés	PP	Spokesperson for the City Council
José Marí Olano	PP	Councilor
José Luis Moreno Maicas	PP	Councilor
Paula María Llobet Vilarrasa	PP	Fifth Deputy Mayor
Santiago Ballester Casabuena	PP	Sixth Deputy Mayor
Jesús Carbonell Aguilar	PP	Seventh Deputy Mayor
Cecilia Carmen Herrero Camilleri	Vox	Councilor

=== Government Departments ===
The different powers exercised by the City Council can be grouped into various areas of government according to their theme and similarity of function as determined by the mayor. Each department has a deputy mayor or councilor to direct, plan, coordinate, and define the political objectives. In addition, each department leaders will have councilors delegated to direct the activity of the department. For the 2023-2027 legislature, the Valencia City Council is composed of the mayor's area and 11 other areas of government with the following delegated departments:

Department	Leaders	Party	Delegacion
Alcaldía	María José Catalá Verdet	PP	Mayor
Alcaldía	Juan Carlos Caballero Montañés	PP	Institutional Relations and relations with other administrations. Press and Media. Spokesperson for the Municipal Government.
Alcaldía	José Marí Olano	PP	Large Projects
Alcaldía	Paula María Llobet Vilarrasa	PP	Turism. Innovation, Technology, Digital Agenda, and Attracting Investments
Finance and Participation	María José Ferrer San Segundo	PP	Finance and Taxes. City Districts, Participation, and Neighborhood Action.
Finance and Participation	Juan Carlos Caballero Montañés	PP	Transparency, Information and Advocacy
Employment, Entrepreneurship, and Training.	Juan Manuel Bádenas Carpio	Vox	Employment and Training
Employment, Entrepreneurship, and Training.	Cecilia Carmen Herrero Camilleri	Vox	Entrepreneurship
Heritage. Human and Technical Resources	Julia Climent Monzó	PP	Human Resources. Central Technical Services. Hiring.
Heritage. Human and Technical Resources	José Marí Olano	PP	Patrimony. Administrative Controls.
Security and Mobility	Jesús Carbonell Aguilar	PP	City Police. Transportation. Public Spaces.
Security and Mobility	Juan Carlos Caballero Montañés	PP	Fire Department. Civil Protection.
Security and Mobility	Santiago Ballester Casabuena	PP	Commerce and Markets
Urban Planning, Housing, and Licensing	Juan Manuel Giner Corell	PP	Housing. Management of Construction and Infrastructure Maintenance. Urban Planning and Management. Licensing and Permitting.
Parks, Gardens, and Natural Spaces	Juan Manuel Bádenas Carpio	Vox	Parks and Gardens
Parks, Gardens, and Natural Spaces	José Vicente Gosálbez Payá	Vox	Saler Forest.^{in ES} Albufera Natural Park
Parks, Gardens, and Natural Spaces	Mónica Gil Cano	Vox	Beaches
Parks, Gardens, and Natural Spaces	Cecilia Carmen Herrero Camilleri	Vox	Agriculture
Residuos, mejora climática y gestión del agua	Carlos Luis Mundina Gómez	PP	Cleaning and Waste Management. Integral Water Cycle. Climate, Acoustic, and Energy Efficiency Improvement. Cemeteries and Funeral Services.
Family, Seniors and Traditions.	Mónica Gil Cano	Vox	Family, Youth and Childhood. Festivals and Traditions.
Family, Seniors and Traditions.	José Vicente Gosálbez Payá	Vox	Senior Citizens. Health and Consumption.
Social Welfare.	Marta Torrado de Castro	PP	Social Services.
Social Welfare.	María del Rocío Gil Uncio	PP	Equality
Cultura, educación, deportes y Fallas	Jose Luis Moreno Maicas	PP	Cultural action, heritage and cultural resources.
Cultura, educación, deportes y Fallas	María del Rocío Gil Uncio	PP	Education. Sports.
Cultura, educación, deportes y Fallas	Santiago Ballester Casabuena	PP	Fallas

=== Municipal Boards ===
The Municipal Boards are decentralized management bodies whose purpose is to bring municipal management closer to the neighbors and encourage their participation in matters of municipal competence. Each board has a President and a Vice President who are appointed and dismissed by the Mayor or the plenary council. The President represents the Mayor within the scope of the City Council and ensures the correct application of the regulations and programs of the City of Valencia in its specific area. The territory of a particular Municipal Board does not necessarily coincide with the districts or neighborhoods of Valencia (Divisions of Valencia in Castilian).

=== Suburban Mayor's Offices ===
In the municipality of Valencia, in addition to the main urban nucleus of the city, there are 15 other urban centers called pedanías that are governed under the authority of the Ayuntamiento. The Mayor of Valencia has the authority to appoint a neighbor resident of each of the districts to perform the tasks that the law entrusts to them. They are the authority responsible for the fulfillment of the municipal tasks in their district and they have other powers delegated by the mayor's office of the Municipality to bring the administration closer to the community.
