= Ricard Pérez Casado =

Spanish politician (1945–2026)

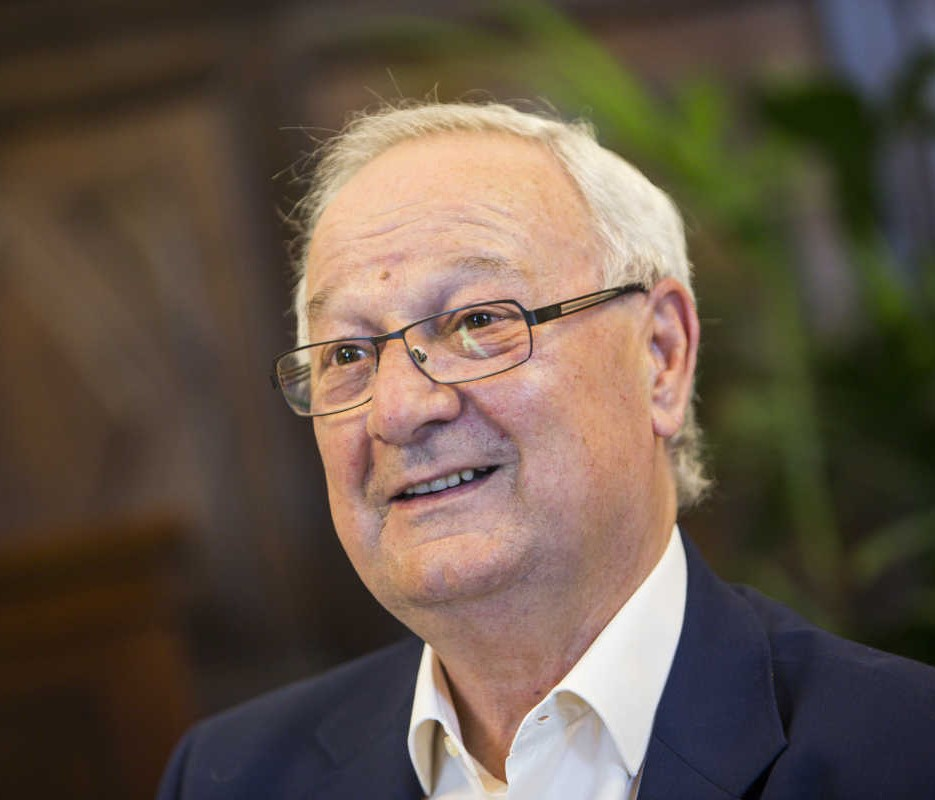
Pérez Casado in 2017

Ricard Pérez Casado (27 October 1945 – 14 January 2026) was a Spanish politician who served as the mayor of Valencia, representing the Spanish Socialist Workers' Party (PSOE).

== Life and career ==
Pérez was born in Valencia on 27 October 1945. He studied Economic Science at University of Barcelona and graduated in Political and Social Science at Complutense University of Madrid before gaining a PhD in history from University of Valencia. During the Franco era he became involved in the Valencian Socialist Party (PSV) which later became linked to the PSOE. In 1979 he became mayor of Valencia, replacing Ferran Martínez Castellano who was expelled from the party after a dispute over abandoning the party's residual Marxism. Pérez was re-elected in 1983 and 1987; however he resigned in 1988 after disagreements with the local branch of the party.

In 1996 he served as European Union administrator for the Bosnian city of Mostar. He entered national politics in 2000 when he was elected to the national parliament as a deputy for Valencia but did not stand in 2004. He has also served as vice-president of the Council of European Municipalities and Regions and served on the Federal Committee of the PSOE.

Pérez Casado was married with one son. He died in Valencia on 14 January 2026, at the age of 80.
