= Rita Barberá =

Spanish politician (1948–2016)

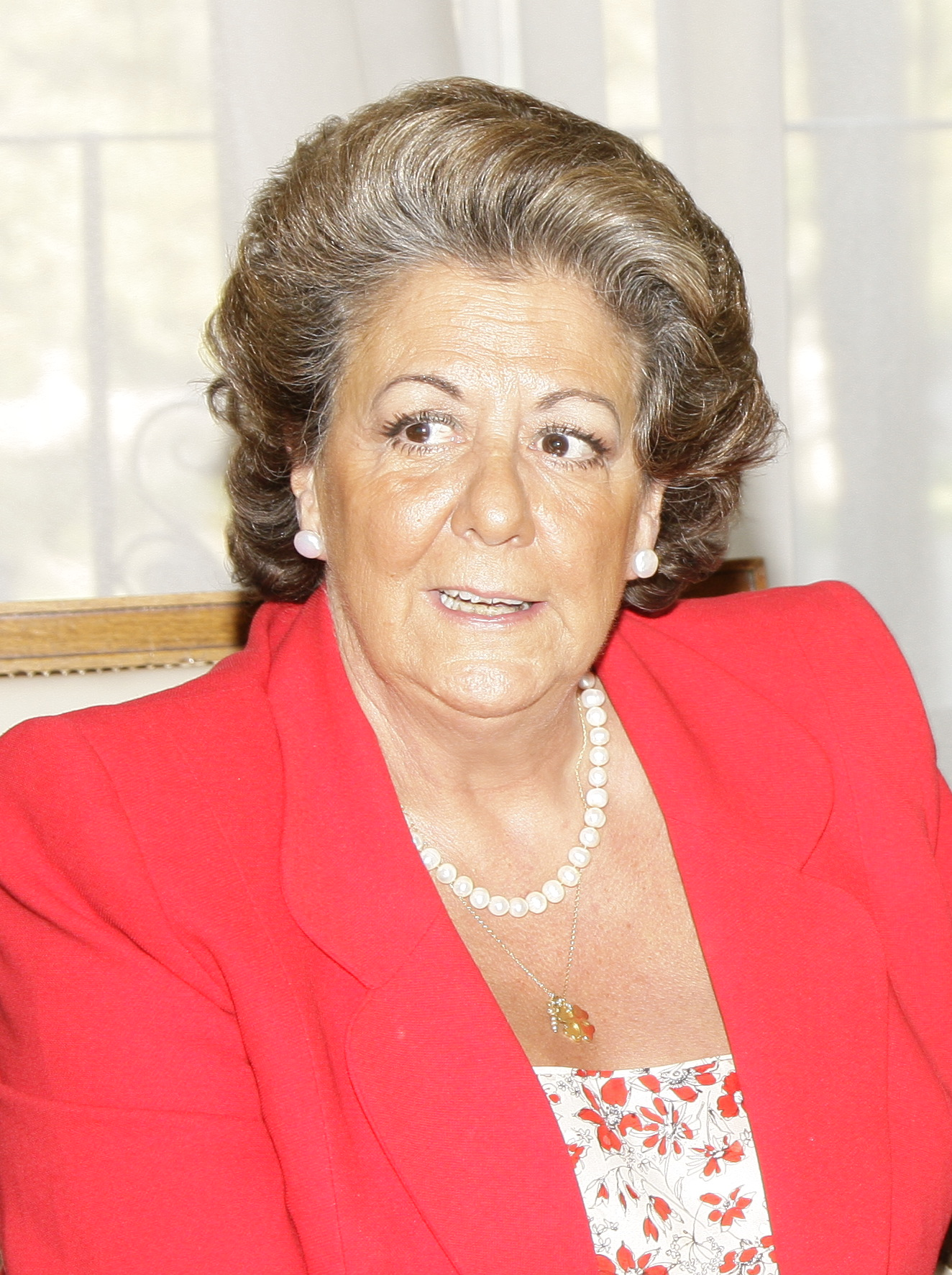

Mayor of Valencia
- In office 5 July 1991 – 13 June 2015
- Preceded by: Clementina Ródenas
- Succeeded by: Joan Ribó

Spanish Senator for designation of the Corts Valencianes
- In office 23 July 2015 – 23 November 2016

Personal details
- Born: 16 July 1948 Valencia, Spain
- Died: 23 November 2016 (aged 68) Madrid, Spain
- Party: People's Alliance (until 1989); People's Party (1989–2016); suspended
- Occupation: Politician

María Rita Barberá Nolla (16 July 1948 – 23 November 2016) was a Spanish politician who was the mayor of Valencia from 1991 until 2015.

== Biography and political career ==
Born in Valencia to a prominent industrial and political family, she was a member of the National Council of the People's Party of Spain and was a Representative in the Valencian regional Parliament (Corts Valencianes). She turned down an offer to become a national deputy at the 2008 Spanish General Election, but her party made her a senator after she lost the 2015 municipal elections. As such, she became answerable only to the Supreme Court, and the ordinary judge in charge of the Taula corruption case could therefore not indict her like the rest of her team.

== 2016 judicial case and death ==
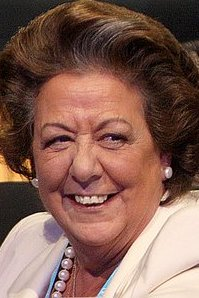
Rita Barberá in 2015

On 21 April 2016, this investigating judge therefore requested her indictment for money laundering to the Supreme Court. On 13 September 2016 the Supreme Court opened a formal investigation, usually the step before an indictment, and the People's Party asked her to resign her senate seat. She chose instead to formally leave the party and to become an independent senator, remaining answerable only to the Supreme Court and keeping her senator salary. Until her death, she continued to socialize and vote with the party that she had formally left.

Barberá died in Madrid on 23 November 2016 of a heart attack as a result of hepatic cirrhosis. She was in the process of being investigated for money laundering at the time, and had testified to the Supreme Court only two days prior to her death.
