= Sandra Gómez (politician) =

Spanish politician

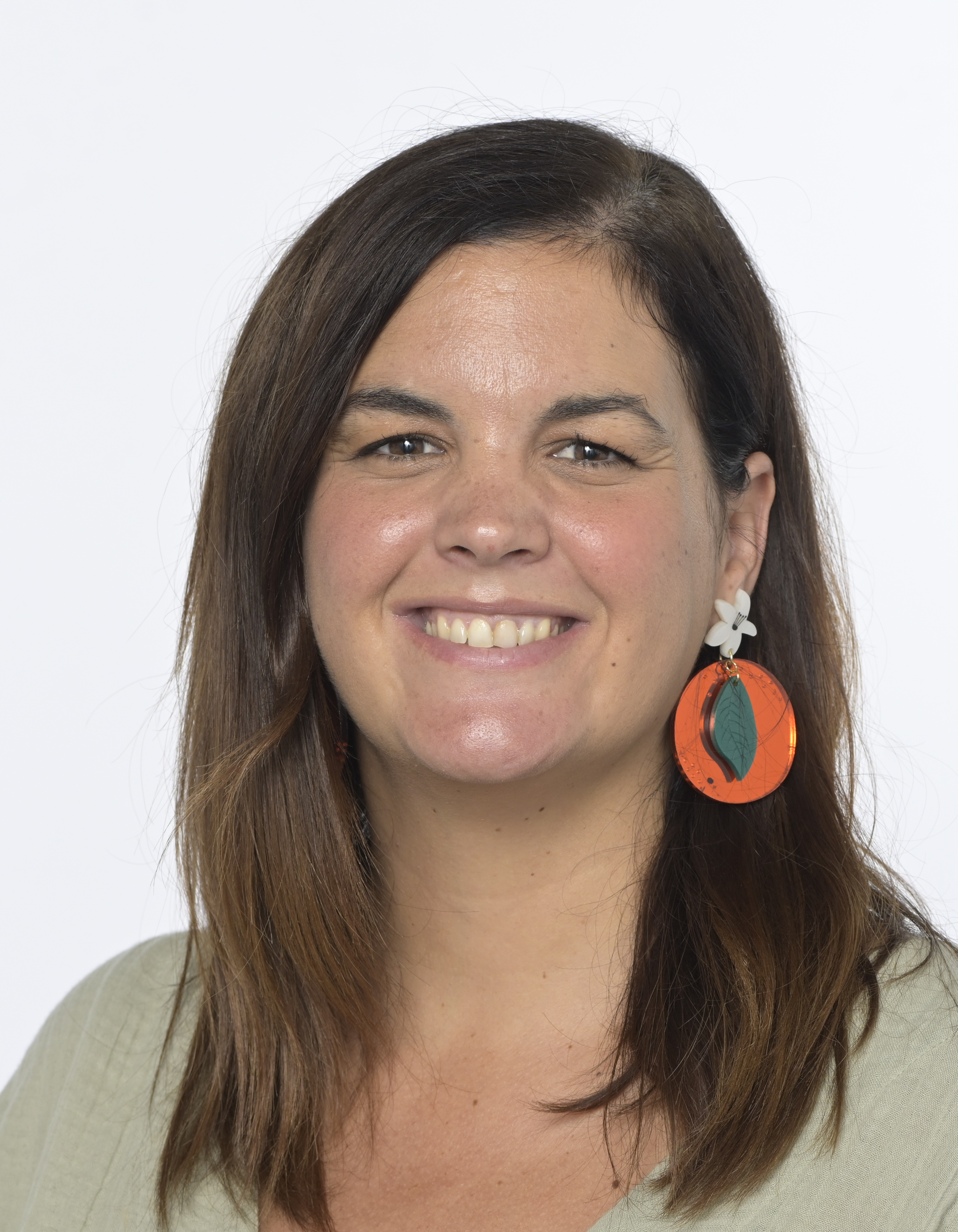

Member of the European Parliament
- Incumbent
- Assumed office 16 July 2024
- Constituency: Spain

Deputy Mayor of Valencia
- In office 5 August 2016 – 17 June 2023
- Preceded by: Joan Calabuig
- Succeeded by: María Jesús Ferrer

Personal details
- Born: 23 July 1985 (age 41) Valencia, Spain
- Party: Spanish Socialist Workers' Party (PSOE)
- Education: University of Valencia
- Profession: Lawyer

Sandra Gómez López (Spanish pronunciation: [ˈsandɾa ˈɣomeθ]; born 23 July 1985) is a Spanish Socialist Workers' Party (PSOE) politician.

After working as a lawyer on the Gürtel case and Nóos case, she was elected to Valencia City Council in 2015, becoming her party's leader in the council and deputy mayor the following year. She was elected as a Member of the European Parliament in 2024.

== Early life and legal career ==
Born in Valencia, Gómez graduated in Law and in Business Administration and Management from the University of Valencia as well as having a master's degree in Business Law from the Garrigues Centre of Studies and Harvard University, and another such degree in Human Rights, Democracy and International Justice from the University of Valencia. As a lawyer, she worked on the Gürtel case and Nóos case relating to corruption. She had the former deputy mayor of Valencia from the People's Party (PP), Alfonso Grau, implicated in the Nóos case in 2015.

== Political career ==
Gómez joined the Spanish Socialist Workers' Party (PSOE) youth sector, the Socialist Youth of Spain (JSE) at age 18 and was president of its division in the Valencian Community. She was number two on the PSOE list for the 2015 Valencia City Council election behind Joan Calabuig. She was elected and appointed Deputy Mayor in the Area of Citizen Protection, becoming the first woman to lead the city's police and fire departments.

In August 2016, Calabuig resigned his seat to become the council's delegate to the European Union, and was replaced by Gómez as the PSOE spokesperson within the council. In February 2018, she became secretary general of the party in the city with 56.1% of the vote, defeating Maite Girau. Eight months later, she was proclaimed as the party's candidate for mayor in the 2019 Valencia City Council election. Her party rose from five seats to seven, maintaining their place in local government alongside Coalició Compromís of mayor Joan Ribó despite the wipeout of the former ally Unidas Podemos.

Gómez caused controversy in December 2020 by marking Christmas with a tweet showing a painting of the Virgin Mary giving birth, accompanied by the caption "Even God was born from a woman's cunt". The upload was investigated by prosecutors, who did not find that the image promoted hatred against Christians, as it venerated women for giving birth and showed Jesus being born naturally, both of which are Christian teachings.

Gómez ran for mayor again in the 2023 Valencia City Council election, and the PSOE remained the third-biggest party on seven seats. The local government returned to the right after eight years, with María José Catalá of the PP becoming mayor.

In the 2024 European Parliament election in Spain, Gómez was placed 14th on the PSOE list. The party came second, with 20 seats.
