= 2027 Valencia municipal election =

Election in the Spanish municipality of Valencia

- 23 May 2027

All 33 seats in the City Council of Valencia 17 seats needed for a majority
- Opinion polls
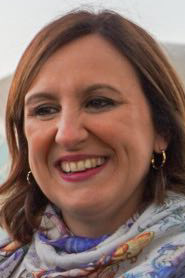

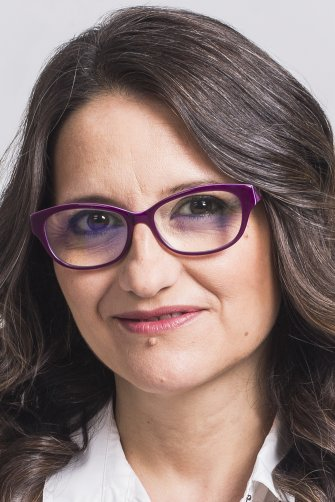

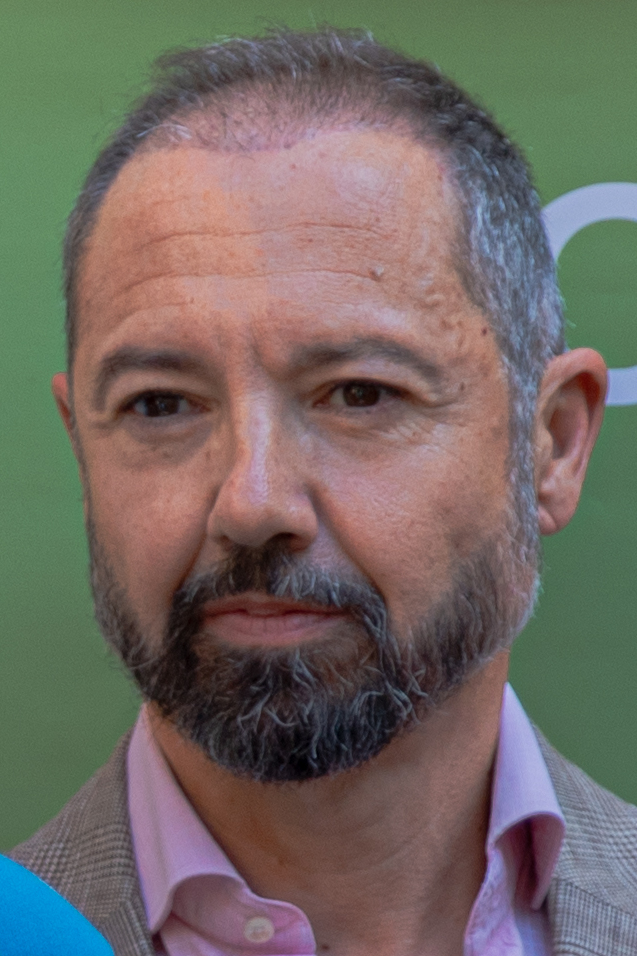
Leader	María José Catalá	Mónica Oltra	Pilar Bernabé
Party	PP	Compromís	PSPV–PSOE
Leader since	12 January 2019	4 July 2026	24 May 2025
Last election	13 seats, 36.6%	9 seats, 24.0%	7 seats, 19.0%
Current seats	13	9	7
Seats needed	▲4	▲8	▲10
Leader	Juan Manuel Badenas
Party	Vox
Leader since	10 February 2023
Last election	4 seats, 12.7%
Current seats	4
Seats needed	▲13
Incumbent Mayor
María José Catalá
PP

A municipal election will be held in Valencia on 23 May 2027 to elect the 13th City Council of the municipality. All 33 seats in the City Council will be up for election. It will be held concurrently with regional elections in at least seven autonomous communities and local elections all across Spain.

== Overview ==
Under the 1978 Constitution, the governance of municipalities in Spain—part of the country's local government system—is centered on the figure of city councils (Spanish: ayuntamientos), local corporations with independent legal personality composed of a mayor, a government council and an elected legislative assembly. The mayor is indirectly elected by the local assembly, requiring an absolute majority; otherwise, the candidate from the most-voted party automatically becomes mayor (ties are resolved by drawing lots). In the case of Valencia, the top-tier administrative and governing body is the City Council of Valencia.

=== Date ===
The term of local assemblies in Spain expires four years after the date of their previous election, with election day being fixed for the fourth Sunday of May every four years (as of 2026, this has been the year before a leap year). The election decree shall be issued no later than 54 days before the scheduled election date and published on the following day in the Official State Gazette (BOE). The previous local elections were held on 28 May 2023, setting the date for election day on the fourth Sunday of May four years later, which is 23 May 2027.

Local assemblies can not be dissolved before the expiration of their term, except in cases of mismanagement that seriously harm the public interest and imply a breach of constitutional obligations, in which case the Council of Ministers can—optionally—decide to call a by-election.

=== Electoral system ===
Voting for local assemblies is based on universal suffrage, comprising all Spanish nationals over 18 years of age, registered and residing in the municipality and with full political rights (provided that they have not been deprived of the right to vote by a final sentence), as well as resident non-national European citizens, and those whose country of origin allow reciprocal voting by virtue of a treaty.

Local councillors are elected using the D'Hondt method and closed-list proportional voting, with a five percent-threshold of valid votes (including blank ballots) in each municipality. Each municipality is a multi-member constituency, with a number of seats based on the following scale:

Population	Councillors
<100	3
101–250	5
251–1,000	7
1,001–2,000	9
2,001–5,000	11
5,001–10,000	13
10,001–20,000	17
20,001–50,000	21
50,001–100,000	25
>100,001	+1 per each 100,000 inhabitants or fraction +1 if total is an even number

The law does not provide for by-elections to fill vacant seats; instead, any vacancies arising after the proclamation of candidates and during the legislative term will be filled by the next candidates on the party lists or, when required, by designated substitutes.

=== Current council ===
The table below shows the composition of the political groups in the local assembly at the present time.

Current council composition
Groups	Parties	Councillors	
Groups	Parties	Seats	Total
People's Municipal Group	PP	13	13
Commitment Municipal Group	Compromís	9	9
Socialist Municipal Group	PSPV–PSOE	7	7
Vox Municipal Group	Vox	4	4

== Parties and candidates ==
The electoral law allows for parties and federations registered in the interior ministry, alliances and groupings of electors to present lists of candidates. Parties and federations intending to form an alliance are required to inform the relevant electoral commission within 10 days of the election call, whereas groupings of electors need to secure the signature of a determined amount of the electors registered in the municipality for which they seek election, disallowing electors from signing for more than one list. In the case of Valencia, as its population is between 300,001 and 1,000,000, at least 5,000 signatures are required. Amendments in 2024 required a balanced composition of men and women in the electoral lists through the use of a zipper system.

Below is a list of the main parties and alliances which will likely contest the election:

Candidacy	Parties and alliances	Leading candidate	Ideology	Previous result		Gov.	Ref.
Candidacy	Parties and alliances	Leading candidate	Ideology	Vote %	Seats	Gov.	Ref.
PP	List: People's Party (PP)	María José Catalá	Conservatism; Christian democracy	36.6%	13	Yes	
Compromís	List: Més–Compromís (Més); Valencian People's Initiative (IdPV); Greens Equo of the Valencian Country (VerdsEquo)	Mónica Oltra	Valencianism; Progressivism; Green politics	24.0%	9	No	
PSPV–PSOE	List: Socialist Party of the Valencian Country (PSPV–PSOE)	Pilar Bernabé	Social democracy	19.0%	7	No	
Vox	List: Vox (Vox)	Juan Manuel Badenas	Right-wing populism Ultranationalism; National conservatism	12.7%	4	Yes	

== Opinion polls ==
The tables below list opinion polling results in reverse chronological order, showing the most recent first and using the dates when the survey fieldwork was done, as opposed to the date of publication. Where the fieldwork dates are unknown, the date of publication is given instead. The highest percentage figure in each polling survey is displayed with its background shaded in the leading party's colour. If a tie ensues, this is applied to the figures with the highest percentages. The "Lead" column on the right shows the percentage-point difference between the parties with the highest percentages in a poll.

=== Graphical summary ===
Local regression trend line of poll results from 28 May 2023 to the present day, with each line corresponding to a political party.

=== Voting intention estimates ===
The table below lists weighted voting intention estimates. Refusals are generally excluded from the party vote percentages, while question wording and the treatment of "don't know" responses and those not intending to vote may vary between polling organisations. When available, seat projections determined by the polling organisations are displayed below (or in place of) the percentages in a smaller font; 17 seats are required for an absolute majority in the City Council of Valencia.

Polling firm/Commissioner	Fieldwork date	Sample size	Turnout	PP	Compromís	PSPV	Vox	Unides Podem–EUPV Podemos	CS	Sumar	SALF	Lead
SyM Consulting/EPDA	1–4 Oct 2026	760	64.9	34.3; 12	25.6; 9	18.6; 6/7	16.8; 5/6	1.7; 0	0.5; 0	–	–	8.7
SyM Consulting/EPDA	18–22 Apr 2026	821	74.0	36.0; 12/13	22.9; 8	23.4; 8	13.4; 4/5	2.1; 0	0.2; 0	–	–	12.6
SyM Consulting	16–20 Mar 2026	873	73.8	36.2; 13	21.3; 7/8	24.0; 8	13.4; 4/5	2.4; 0	0.5; 0	–	–	12.2
SocioMétrica/El Español	17–20 Nov 2025	1,150	?	35.9; 13/14	22.3; 6/7	20.1; 6/7	17.4; 6/7	2.2; 0	–	–	–	13.6
SyM Consulting/EPDA (Note: "La derecha retiene la alcaldía de Valencia gracias al ascenso de Vox". El Periódico de Aquí (in Spanish). 29 November 2025. Archived from the original on 30 December 2025.)	3–6 Nov 2025	984	?	32.2; 11/12	25.5; 8/9	19.6; 7	16.9; 6	2.4; 0	0.7; 0	–	–	6.7
SyM Consulting	28–31 May 2025	917	67.9	39.0; 13/14	23.0; 8	20.1; 7	12.7; 4/5	1.1; 0	1.3; 0	–	–	16.0
SyM Consulting/EPDA	11–14 Mar 2025	906	67.9	40.0; 14/15	22.4; 8	19.2; 6/7	12.1; 4	1.6; 0	1.8; 0	–	–	17.6
GfK/Compromís	9–28 Jan 2025	1,215	?	32.5; 11/12	26.7; 9/10	20.5; 7	15.4; 5	1.8; 0	–	–	1.7; 0	5.8
SyM Consulting/EPDA	1–7 Nov 2024	938	71.1	37.3; 13/14	23.7; 8/9	17.5; 6	14.0; 5	2.4; 0	2.2; 0	–	–	13.6
Demoscopia y Servicios/ESdiario	3–5 Oct 2024	800	67.0	38.6; 14	20.3; 7	20.8; 8	12.0; 4	3.5; 0	–	–	–	17.8
SyM Consulting	17–20 Sep 2024	908	66.4	39.0; 14	23.7; 8	18.8; 6/7	13.6; 4/5	1.9; 0	0.5; 0	–	–	15.3
2024 EP election	9 Jun 2024	—N/a	60.3	36.9 (13)	(Note: Within Sumar.)	29.2 (11)	10.7 (4)	4.3 (0)	1.0 (0)	8.8 (3)	5.3 (2)	7.7
SyM Consulting/EPDA	10–13 May 2024	932	71.9	38.6; 14	24.6; 8/9	18.7; 6	13.3; 4/5	2.0; 0	0.5; 0	–	–	14.0
2023 general election	23 Jul 2023	—N/a	76.1	36.5 (12)		29.5 (10)	14.1 (5)		–	17.7 (6)	–	7.0
2023 municipal election	28 May 2023	—N/a	72.0	36.6; 13	24.0; 9	19.0; 7	12.7; 4	2.3; 0	2.3; 0	–	–	12.6

=== Preferred Mayor ===
The table below lists opinion polling on leader preferences to become mayor of Valencia.

Polling firm/Commissioner	Fieldwork date	Sample size					Other/ None/ Not care	Question	Lead
Polling firm/Commissioner	Fieldwork date	Sample size	Catalá PP	Robles Compromís	Bernabé PSPV	Badenas Vox	Other/ None/ Not care	Question	Lead
SocioMétrica/El Español	17–20 Nov 2025	1,150	32.3	15.3	17.7	11.6	–	23.1	14.6

== Bibliography ==
- Constitución Española (Constitution). Official State Gazette (in Spanish). 27 December 1978 [version as of 20 May 2026]. BOE-A-1978-31229.
- Ley 7/1985, de 2 de abril, Reguladora de las Bases del Régimen Local (Law 7/1985). Official State Gazette (in Spanish). 2 April 1985 [version as of 3 June 2026]. BOE-A-1985-5392.
- Ley Orgánica 5/1985, de 19 de junio, del Régimen Electoral General (Organic Law 5/1985). Official State Gazette (in Spanish). 19 June 1985 [version as of 2 July 2026]. BOE-A-1985-11672.
