= Papi Robles =

Carmen Luisa "Papi" Robles Galindo (born 7 December 1982) is a Spanish politician of Coalició Compromís. She was a deputy in the Corts Valencianes from 2019 to 2023, and was then elected to Valencia City Council.

== Biography ==
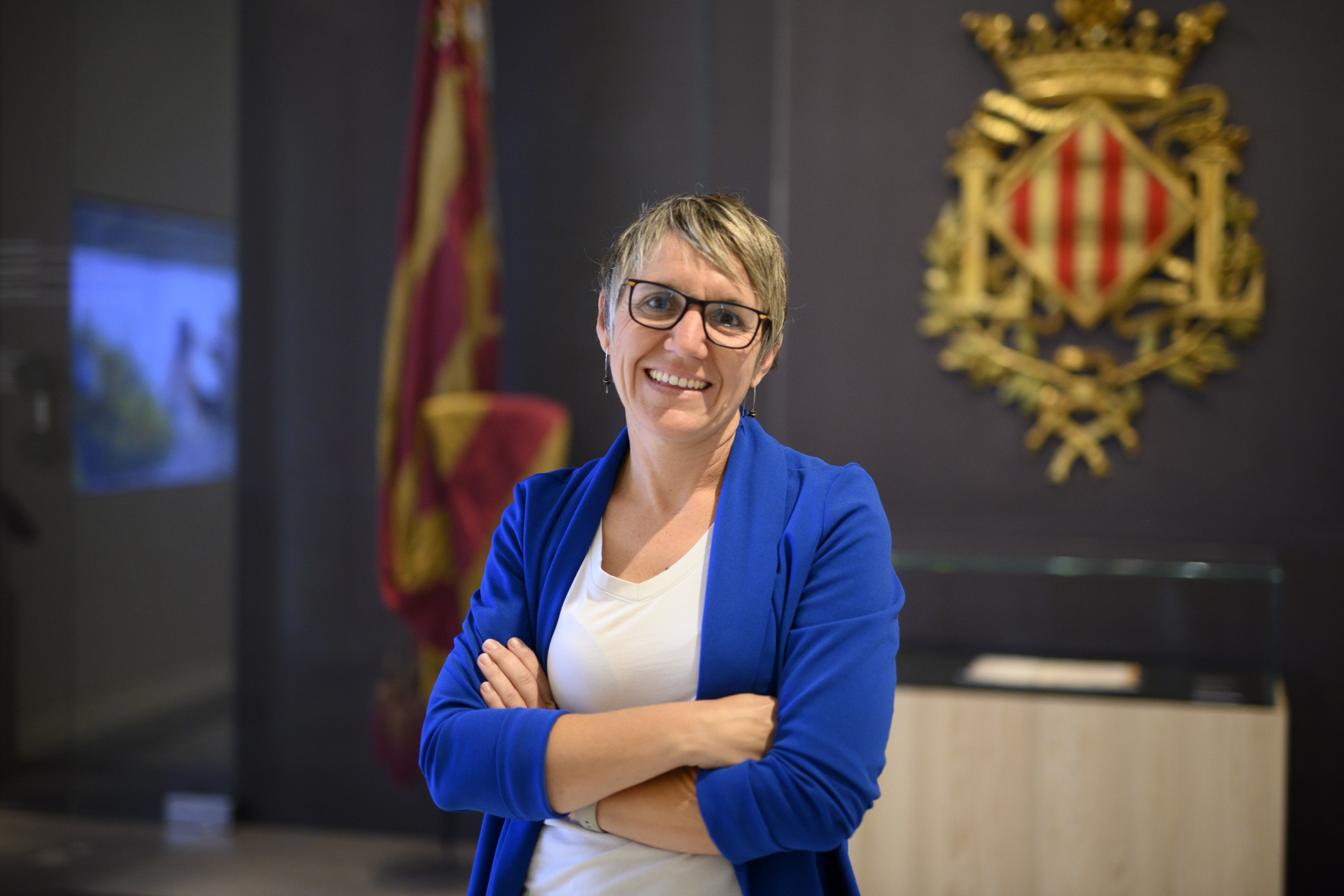

Born in Murcia, Robles was raised in Orihuela in the Valencian Community and learned the language known as Valencian in the region. She is a forest engineer. According to Robles, her nickname came from an uncle who had lived abroad and learned the word papirusa, meaning a pretty woman. She was active in Scouting between the ages of 8 and 28. She moved to the city of Valencia around 2004.

In the 2019 Valencian regional election, Robles was placed sixth on the Coalició Compromís list in the Valencia constituency. The coalition took nine seats in the constituency and sixteen overall, forming the second government of Ximo Puig, led by the Socialist Party of the Valencian Country (PSPV) and also assisted by Unides Podem. In January 2022, after the resignation of Fran Ferri, Robles was chosen as the Compromís spokesperson in the Corts Valencianes.

In October 2022, Robles was chosen in second place on the list of incumbent Valencia mayor Joan Ribó for the 2023 election. The left lost control of the city council, with María José Catalá of the People's Party (PP) forming a minority government. After the resignation of Ribó, Robles succeeded him as party spokesperson in the council in November 2023. She proposed new housing for locals, limiting cruise ship arrivals, ending new tourist apartments and limiting rent.

Catalá chose Robles to be the standard bearer carrying the Flag of the Valencian Community in the city's celebrations on 9 October 2024. She and her party did not take part in the religious aspects of the celebrations at Valencia Cathedral due to belief that the city's festival should not prioritise one religion; she handed the flag over to Catalá for that part of the event.
