= Pilar Lima =

Spanish politician of Podemos (born 1977)

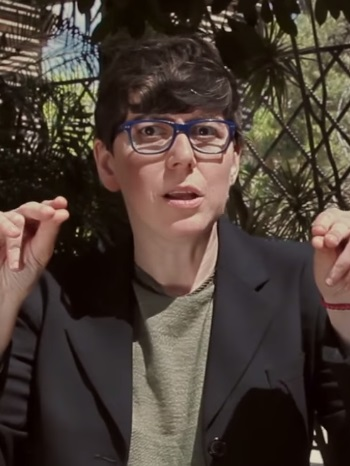

María Pilar Lima Gozálvez (born 21 November 1977) is a Spanish politician of the party Podemos. She served as a senator from 2015 to 2019 and a member of the Corts Valencianes from 2019 to 2023. She was the leader of Podemos in the Valencian Community from 2020 to 2023, resigning after an unsuccessful campaign in the 2023 Valencia City Council election. Deaf from birth, she was Spain's first deaf senator.

== Biography ==
Lima was born in Valencia. She was deaf from birth, which her family discovered when she was two years old, and did not learn a sign language until the age of 16. She graduated in Social Work and became a sign language teacher. She did voluntary work for the Vicente Ferrer Foundation in Anantapur, India, where she trained sign language teachers. Lima is openly lesbian.

In 2015, Lima was nominated for the Senate of Spain by the Podemos group in the Corts Valencianes. She required sign language interpreters and prepared for her office by contacting deaf Members of the European Parliament.

Lima was elected to the Corts as list leader in the Valencia constituency in 2019, also becoming the Podemos spokesperson in the chamber, as the party formed the Generalitat Valenciana with Coalició Compromís and the Spanish Socialist Workers' Party (PSOE). In June 2020, she became the party's secretary general at regional level, with 44.7% of the votes.

In November 2022, Lima became the Podemos candidate for mayor in the 2023 Valencia City Council election; the party had no seats in the council from the previous election in 2019. The party won no seats in the 2023 election, nor in the concurrent regional election, and she resigned as its leader in the autonomous community. During the election campaign, the Ministry of Social Rights and 2030 Agenda reported the comedian Pablo Motos and the media conglomerate Atresmedia to prosecutors for allegedly mocking Lima's sexual orientation and disability.
