= Cristina Álvarez Rodríguez =

Argentine architect

Cristina Álvarez-Rodríguez
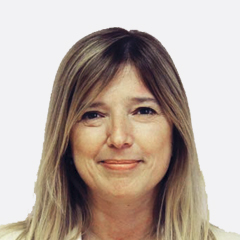
- Cristina in 2017

Minister of Government of Buenos Aires Province
- Incumbent
- Assumed office 21 September 2021
- Governor: Axel Kicillof
- Preceded by: Teresa García
- In office 10 December 2011 – 10 December 2015
- Governor: Daniel Scioli
- Preceded by: Florencio Randazzo
- Succeeded by: Federico Salvai

National Deputy
- In office 10 December 2015 – 21 September 2021
- Constituency: Buenos Aires
- In office 10 December 2005 – 10 December 2007
- Constituency: Buenos Aires

Minister of Infrastructure of Buenos Aires Province
- In office 10 December 2007 – 10 December 2011
- Governor: Daniel Scioli
- Preceded by: Eduardo Sícaro
- Succeeded by: Alejandro Gaspar Arlía

Personal details
- Born: María Cristina Álvarez Rodríguez; 28 December 1967 (age 58) Buenos Aires, Argentina
- Party: Justicialist Party
- Other political affiliations: Frente de Todos (2019–present); Unidad Ciudadana (2017–2019); Front for Victory (2003–2017)
- Education: University of Buenos Aires

María Cristina Álvarez-Rodríguez (born 28 December 1967) is an Argentine architect and politician, currently serving as Minister of Government and Infrastructure of Buenos Aires Province, under Governor Axel Kicillof. She was previously a National Deputy representing Buenos Aires Province from 2015 to 2021. A great-niece of Eva Perón, she belongs to the peronist Justicialist Party.

== Education ==
Rodriquez was born in Buenos Aires on December 28, 1967. She got her degree in architecture in 1992 from the University of Buenos Aires Faculty of Architecture, Design and Urbanism. In 2002 she completed a master's degree in Photography from the University of Palermo.

== Career ==
Rodriquez was appointed Director of the Historical Archives of the Province of Buenos Aires in 2000. A year later, she became President of the Institute of Social Welfare of the Province of Buenos Aires. In 2002 she became Secretary of Culture of the same province. She was chair of the Cultural Institute of Buenos Aires from 2003-2005. From 2005-2007 she served as President Ad-honorem of the Social Integration Council of the Government of the Province of Buenos Aires. That same year she was on the committees of Municipal Affairs, Culture, Natural Resources and Human Environment Conservation, Tourism. She was a committee member for two years. In 2005 she was also the Vice President of the Commission on Addiction Prevention and Control of Narcotics Chamber of Deputies. She won membership of the National Front for Victory in 2005. In 2007 she was appointed Minister of Tourism of the Government of the Province of Buenos Aires.

== Electoral history ==
Electoral history of Cristina Álvarez Rodríguez
Election	Office	List	#	District	Votes			Result	Ref.
Election	Office	List	#	District	Total	%	P.	Result	Ref.
2005	National Deputy	Front for Victory	2	Buenos Aires Province	2,831,777	43.04%	1st (Note: Presented on an electoral list. The data shown represents the share of the vote the entire party/alliance received in that constituency.)	Elected	
2015	National Deputy	Front for Victory	2	Buenos Aires Province	3,354,619	37.28%	1st	Elected	
2019	National Deputy	Frente de Todos	4	Buenos Aires Province	5,113,359	52.64%	1st	Elected	

Party political offices
Preceded by Daniel Scioli	Vice President of the Justicialist Party; 2021–2024	Succeeded by José Mayans
