= Fernando Giner (politician) =

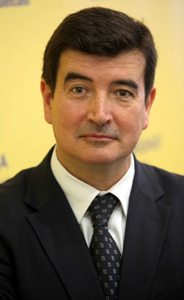

Fernando Giner Grima (born 10 October 1964) is a Spanish businessman, economist and former politician. A member of the Citizens party, he led them to six seats on Valencia City Council in 2015 and 2019, before leaving politics when they lost all their seats in 2023.

== Biography ==
Born as the youngest child in a business-owning family in Valencia, Giner graduated in business sciences from the University of Valencia in 1987 and obtained a Master of Business Administration from the IESE Business School of the University of Navarre three years later.

In 2014, Giner joined Citizens and became its lead candidate in the 2015 Valencia City Council election. He said that his party aimed to win the election and would not form a coalition with any party whose candidates were indicted for criminal charges. His party came third with 15% of the vote and six seats. Outgoing mayor of the People's Party (PP) Rita Barberá proposed a pact in which Giner would be mayor in a coalition including the Spanish Socialist Workers' Party (PSOE), providing that this last party cut ties with Coalició Compromís. This plan came to nothing and Joan Ribó of Compromís became mayor with support from the PSOE and Podemos, while the PP and Cs supported their own candidates.

In October 2015, Citizens' national executive made Giner the party's spokesperson in the Valencian Community, Five years later, he was made coordinator in the Province of Valencia. In 2017, he was made the party's secretary responsible for the self-employed and small and medium-sized enterprises.

In the 2019 Valencia City Council election, Citizens remained on six councillors, falling to fourth place as the PSOE improved and Podemos were wiped out; Ribó remained mayor. Four years later, Giner was profiled by El País as one of the highest-profile office holders remaining in the party, as it had been affected by losses and defections, while La Vanguardia saw it as near impossible for him to keep any seats on the council. Giner rejected an offer from the PP to join their list for the election. His party received under 3% of the vote, under the 5% necessary for a seat, thus being wiped out.

After being voted out of office, Giner returned to the private sector while remaining a grassroots activist for Citizens. In February 2024, he became an advisory board member at Improven, a consultancy firm.
