= 2023 Valencia municipal election =

Election in the Spanish municipality of Valencia

- 28 May 2023

All 33 seats in the City Council of Valencia 17 seats needed for a majority
- Opinion polls
- Registered: 579,205 ▼1.3%
- Turnout: 417,512 (72.1%) ▲5.8 pp
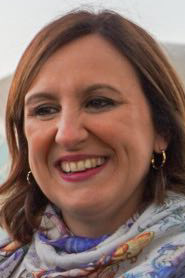

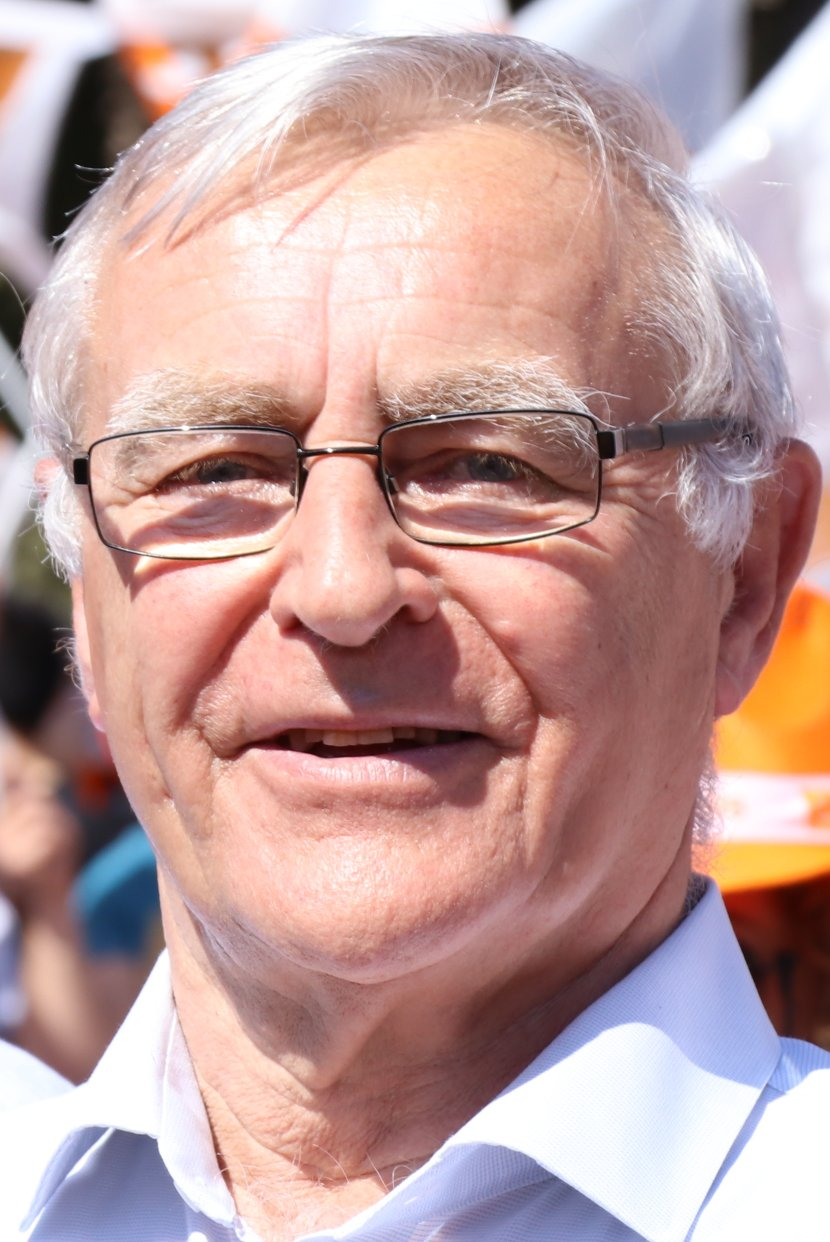

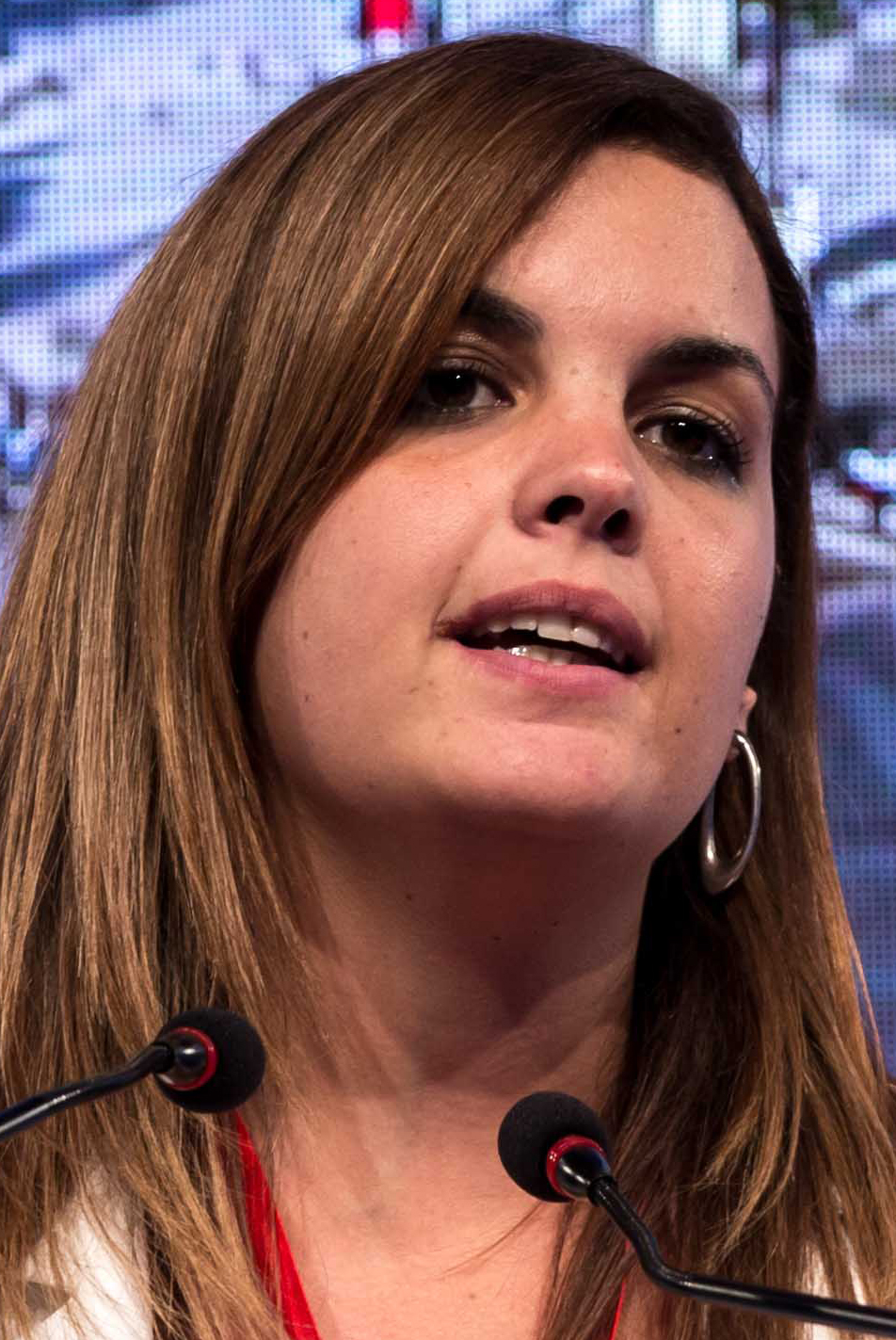

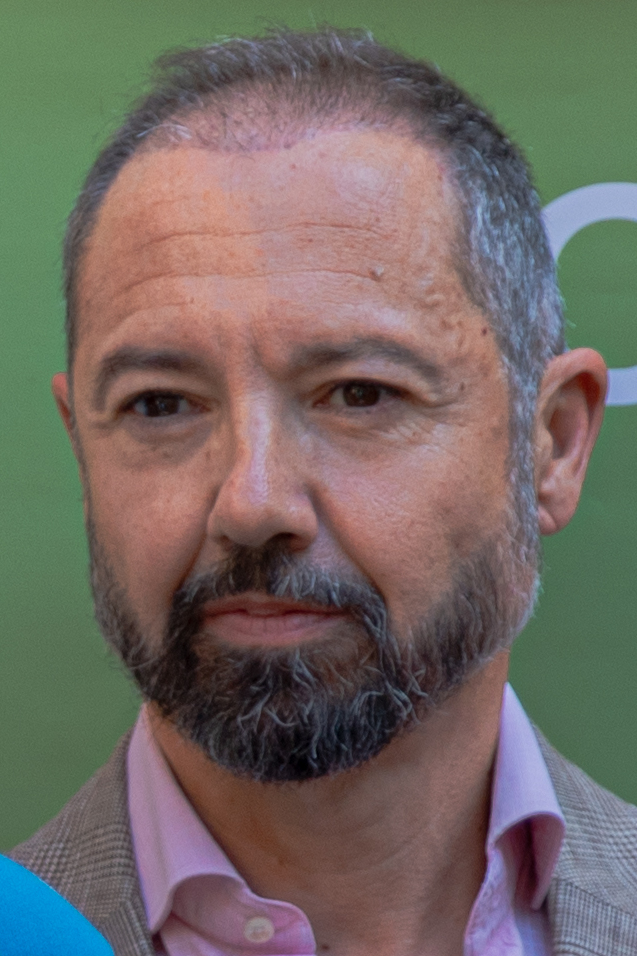

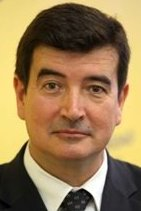
	First party	Second party	Third party
Leader	María José Catalá	Joan Ribó	Sandra Gómez
Party	PP	Acord per Guanyar	PSPV–PSOE
Leader since	12 January 2019	7 May 2010	14 October 2018
Last election	8 seats, 21.8%	10 seats, 27.4%	7 seats, 19.3%
Seats won	13	9	7
Seat change	▲5	▼1	0
Popular vote	151,737	99,382	78,655
Percentage	36.6%	24.0%	19.0%
Swing	▲14.8 pp	▼3.4 pp	▼0.3 pp
	Fourth party	Fifth party
Leader	Juan Manuel Badenas	Fernando Giner
Party	Vox	CS
Leader since	10 February 2023	28 March 2015
Last election	2 seats, 7.3%	6 seats, 17.6%
Seats won	4	0
Seat change	▲2	▼6
Popular vote	52,738	9,573
Percentage	12.7%	2.3%
Swing	▲5.4 pp	▼15.3 pp
Mayor before election
Joan Ribó
Compromís
Mayor after election
María José Catalá
PP

A municipal election was held in Valencia on 28 May 2023 to elect the 12th City Council of the municipality. All 33 seats in the City Council were up for election. It was held concurrently with regional elections in twelve autonomous communities and local elections all across Spain.

== Overview ==
Under the 1978 Constitution, the governance of municipalities in Spain—part of the country's local government system—was centered on the figure of city councils (Spanish: ayuntamientos), local corporations with independent legal personality composed of a mayor, a government council and an elected legislative assembly. The mayor was indirectly elected by the local assembly, requiring an absolute majority; otherwise, the candidate from the most-voted party automatically became mayor (ties were resolved by drawing lots). In the case of Valencia, the top-tier administrative and governing body was the City Council of Valencia.

=== Date ===
The term of local assemblies in Spain expired four years after the date of their previous election, with election day being fixed for the fourth Sunday of May every four years. The election decree was required to be issued no later than 54 days before the scheduled election date and published on the following day in the Official State Gazette (BOE). The previous local elections were held on 26 May 2019, setting the date for election day on the fourth Sunday of May four years later, which was 28 May 2023.

Local assemblies could not be dissolved before the expiration of their term, except in cases of mismanagement that seriously harmed the public interest and implied a breach of constitutional obligations, in which case the Council of Ministers could—optionally—decide to call a by-election.

Elections to the assemblies of local entities were officially called on 4 April 2023 with the publication of the corresponding decree in the BOE, setting election day for 28 May.

=== Electoral system ===
Voting for local assemblies was based on universal suffrage, comprising all Spanish nationals over 18 years of age, registered and residing in the municipality and with full political rights (provided that they had not been deprived of the right to vote by a final sentence), as well as resident non-national European citizens, and those whose country of origin allowed reciprocal voting by virtue of a treaty.

Local councillors were elected using the D'Hondt method and closed-list proportional voting, with a five percent-threshold of valid votes (including blank ballots) in each municipality. Each municipality was a multi-member constituency, with a number of seats based on the following scale:

Population	Councillors
<100	3
101–250	5
251–1,000	7
1,001–2,000	9
2,001–5,000	11
5,001–10,000	13
10,001–20,000	17
20,001–50,000	21
50,001–100,000	25
>100,001	+1 per each 100,000 inhabitants or fraction +1 if total is an even number

The law did not provide for by-elections to fill vacant seats; instead, any vacancies arising after the proclamation of candidates and during the legislative term were filled by the next candidates on the party lists or, when required, by designated substitutes.

=== Outgoing council ===
The table below shows the composition of the political groups in the local assembly at the time of the election call.

Council composition in April 2023
Groups	Parties	Councillors	
Groups	Parties	Seats	Total
Commitment to Valencia Municipal Group	Compromís	10	10
People's Municipal Group	PP	8	8
Socialist Municipal Group	PSPV–PSOE	7	7
Citizens–Party of the Citizenry Municipal Group	CS	6	6
Vox Municipal Group	Vox	2	2

== Parties and candidates ==
The electoral law allowed for parties and federations registered in the interior ministry, alliances and groupings of electors to present lists of candidates. Parties and federations intending to form an alliance were required to inform the relevant electoral commission within 10 days of the election call, whereas groupings of electors needed to secure the signature of a determined amount of the electors registered in the municipality for which they sought election, disallowing electors from signing for more than one list. In the case of Valencia, as its population was between 300,001 and 1,000,000, at least 5,000 signatures were required. Additionally, a balanced composition of men and women was required in the electoral lists, so that candidates of either sex made up at least 40 percent of the total composition.

Below is a list of the main parties and alliances which contested the election:

Candidacy	Parties and alliances	Leading candidate	Ideology	Previous result		Gov.	Ref.
Candidacy	Parties and alliances	Leading candidate	Ideology	Vote %	Seats	Gov.	Ref.
Acord per Guanyar	List: Més–Compromís (Més); Valencian People's Initiative (IdPV); Greens Equo of the Valencian Country (VerdsEquo)	Joan Ribó	Valencianism; Progressivism; Green politics	27.4%	10	Yes	
PP	List: People's Party (PP)	María José Catalá	Conservatism; Christian democracy	21.8%	8	No	
PSPV–PSOE	List: Socialist Party of the Valencian Country (PSPV–PSOE)	Sandra Gómez	Social democracy	19.3%	7	Yes	
CS	List: Citizens–Party of the Citizenry (CS)	Fernando Giner	Liberalism	17.6%	6	No	
Vox	List: Vox (Vox)	Juan Manuel Badenas	Right-wing populism Ultranationalism; National conservatism	7.3%	2	No	

== Opinion polls ==
The tables below list opinion polling results in reverse chronological order, showing the most recent first and using the dates when the survey fieldwork was done, as opposed to the date of publication. Where the fieldwork dates are unknown, the date of publication is given instead. The highest percentage figure in each polling survey is displayed with its background shaded in the leading party's colour. If a tie ensues, this is applied to the figures with the highest percentages. The "Lead" column on the right shows the percentage-point difference between the parties with the highest percentages in a poll.

=== Graphical summary ===
Local regression trend line of poll results from 26 May 2019 to 28 May 2023, with each line corresponding to a political party.

=== Voting intention estimates ===
The table below lists weighted voting intention estimates. Refusals are generally excluded from the party vote percentages, while question wording and the treatment of "don't know" responses and those not intending to vote may vary between polling organisations. When available, seat projections determined by the polling organisations are displayed below (or in place of) the percentages in a smaller font; 17 seats were required for an absolute majority in the City Council of Valencia.

Color key:

Poll conducted after legal ban on opinion polls

Polling firm/Commissioner	Fieldwork date	Sample size	Turnout	Compromís	PP	PSPV	Cs	Vox	Unides Podem–EUPV	IDEA	Lead
2023 municipal election	28 May 2023	—N/a	72.0	24.0; 9	36.6; 13	19.0; 7	2.3; 0	12.7; 4	2.3; 0	–	12.6
GAD3/RTVE–FORTA	12–27 May 2023	?	?	22.0; 8	35.0; 13/14	21.0; 7/8	2.0; 0	12.0; 4	4.0; 0	–	13.0
KeyData/Público	22 May 2023	?	68.8	23.9; 9	35.9; 13	19.7; 7	–	11.2; 4	–	–	12.0
NC Report/La Razón	22 May 2023	?	?	24.0; 9	37.2; 13	18.9; 7	–	11.6; 4	–	–	13.2
GIPEyOP/UV	10–20 May 2023	?	?	23.4; 7/10	32.0; 10/13	20.1; 6/9	4.4; 0/1	11.6; 3/5	5.3; 0/2	–	8.6
IMOP/El Confidencial	15–18 May 2023	610	?	26.6; 9/10	34.9; 12/13	19.7; 7	2.0; 0	11.6; 4	2.7; 0	–	8.3
Sigma Dos/El Mundo	15–18 May 2023	1,200	?	24.8; 9	36.3; 13	19.1; 7	2.9; 0	11.2; 4	4.0; 0	–	11.5
40dB/Prisa	12–17 May 2023	800	?	25.1; 9	33.2; 12	21.9; 8	3.1; 0	11.2; 4	2.8; 0	–	8.1
Sigma Dos/Las Provincias	11–17 May 2023	750	?	24.4; 8/9	36.1; 12/13	19.5; 7	3.2; 0	10.7; 4	4.4; 0/1	–	11.7
GIPEyOP/UV	10–17 May 2023	?	?	21.3; 7/9	31.8; 11/13	24.3; 7/10	2.2; 0	12.2; 3/5	5.0; 0/2	–	7.5
DYM/Henneo	10–15 May 2023	769	?	23.6; 8/9	35.2; 12/13	21.6; 8	–	11.1; 3/4	4.7; 0/1	–	11.6
SocioMétrica/El Español	8–14 May 2023	?	?	24.0; 9	34.8; 13	20.3; 7	3.0; 0	12.1; 4	3.6; 0	–	10.8
Data10/Okdiario	8–10 May 2023	1,500	?	24.6; 9	33.9; 13	20.4; 7	3.3; 0	12.6; 4	2.8; 0	–	9.3
GAD3/ABC	27 Apr–8 May 2023	601	?	23.4; 8/9	38.3; 14	18.7; 7	–	10.0; 3/4	–	–	14.9
SyM Consulting/EPDA	4–7 May 2023	1,136	63.8	21.5; 8	38.7; 14	20.2; 8	0.9; 0	9.4; 3	2.6; 0	–	17.2
SocioMétrica	6 May 2023	?	?	23.9; 9	35.2; 13	18.9; 7	3.1; 0	12.6; 4	3.1; 0	–	11.3
Sigma Dos/Antena 3	26 Apr 2023	?	?	24.6; 9	35.2; 12/13	? 7/8	3.9; 0	11.9; 4	1.7; 0	–	10.6
CIS	10–26 Apr 2023	1,056	?	30.4; 11/12	29.0; 10	19.5; 7	1.9; 0	11.0; 4/5	4.4; 0/1	–	1.4
NC Report/La Razón	24 Apr 2023	?	66.2	25.3; 9	36.0; 13	19.1; 7	–	11.3; 4	–	–	10.7
PSPV	15 Apr 2023	800	?	22.6; 8	33.4; 13	23.5; 9	3.2; 0	9.4; 3	3.3; 0	–	9.9
GfK/Compromís	14 Apr 2023	?	?	26.1; 9/10	32.0; 11/12	21.4; 7/8	5.6; 0/2	10.4; 3/4	1.4; 0	–	5.9
GAD3/CS	30 Mar–4 Apr 2023	1,004	?	22.2; 8	39.3; 15	18.8; 7	3.1; 0	9.8; 3	3.5; 0	–	17.1
Sigma Dos/El Mundo	27 Mar–4 Apr 2023	?	?	27.0; 9/10	34.4; 12/13	19.4; 7	2.9; 0	11.6; 4	1.6; 0	–	7.4
SyM Consulting/EPDA	23–27 Mar 2023	735	?	21.1; 7/8	39.2; 14/15	18.6; 7	0.7; 0	11.6; 4	2.1; 0	2.4; 0	18.1
KeyData/Público	16 Feb 2023	?	68.5	27.5; 10	34.5; 13	18.5; 6	2.6; 0	10.7; 4	3.4; 0	–	7.0
PSPV	8 Feb 2023	?	?	? 7/8	? 12	? 9/10	3.0; 0	? 3/4	4.0; 0	–	?
PP	8 Feb 2023	?	?	? 8/9	? 13	? 7/8	2.0; 0	? 3/4	3.0; 0	–	?
SyM Consulting/EPDA	2–6 Feb 2023	1,104	?	21.6; 7/8	39.1; 14/15	19.6; 7	0.8; 0	11.7; 4	2.2; 0	4.8; 0	17.5
PSPV	12 Jan 2023	?	?	? 8/9	? 12/13	? 8/9	? 0	? 3/4	4.0; 0	–	?
GfK/City Council	Nov–Dec 2022	2,354	?	17.7; 6/7	29.0; 12	25.3; 10	3.9; 0	10.0; 3/4	5.3; 0/2	–	3.7
SyM Consulting/EPDA	8–11 Dec 2022	830	?	21.6; 8	37.9; 14/15	19.1; 7	0.7; 0	9.5; 3/4	3.3; 0	4.6; 0	16.3
GAD3/PP	7–11 Nov 2022	1,000	?	25.2; 9	34.6; 13	20.5; 7	2.1; 0	12.4; 4	3.0; 0	–	9.4
Sigma Dos/El Mundo	7–10 Nov 2022	800	?	27.8; 10	30.7; 12	22.8; 8	2.9; 0	8.2; 3	3.9; 0	–	2.9
SyM Consulting/EPDA	2–5 Nov 2022	1,010	?	21.7; 8	37.1; 14	20.3; 7/8	0.6; 0	10.2; 3/4	3.2; 0	3.9; 0	15.4
PSPV	12 Oct 2022	2,754	?	22.0; 8	32.4; 11	22.5; 8	2.4; 0	14.3; 5	5.0; 1	–	9.9
SyM Consulting/EPDA	5–8 Oct 2022	905	64.4	23.0; 8/9	38.4; 14/15	19.1; 7	0.8; 0	8.9; 3	3.6; 0	3.2; 0	15.4
SocioMétrica/El Español	3–7 Oct 2022	600	?	21.6; 7/8	31.1; 12/13	22.0; 8	4.4; 0	13.6; 5	4.6; 0	–	9.1
Demoscopia y Servicios/ESdiario	3–5 Oct 2022	?	?	26.9; 9/10	29.3; 11/12	20.8; 7	2.8; 0	13.9; 5	3.3; 0	–	2.4
PP	16 Jul 2022	?	?	17.3; 6	32.0; 11/12	23.1; 8/9	2.9; 0	16.9; 6	5.7; 1	–	8.9
SyM Consulting/EPDA	13–16 Jul 2022	1,042	63.8	26.2; 10	31.3; 11/12	19.1; 7	0.7; 0	12.5; 4/5	3.9; 0	3.5; 0	5.1
EM-Analytics/Electomanía	3–22 May 2022	1,007	?	21.5; 8	29.2; 11	21.2; 8	4.8; 0	16.6; 6	4.6; 0	–	7.7
Sigma Dos/Las Provincias	11–18 May 2022	750	?	27.7; 10	29.4; 11	18.0; 6/7	4.0; 0	15.4; 5/6	3.1; 0	–	1.7
SyM Consulting/EPDA	27–29 Mar 2022	1,017	66.7	21.6; 8	28.7; 10/11	19.3; 7	0.7; 0	20.8; 7/8	3.9; 0	–	7.1
SyM Consulting/EPDA	22–25 Feb 2022	968	64.0	27.7; 10	22.6; 8/9	21.3; 7/8	1.1; 0	18.9; 7	3.0; 0	–	5.1
SyM Consulting/EPDA	7–10 Jan 2022	764	66.3	26.0; 9/10	32.7; 12	18.7; 7	1.3; 0	12.5; 4/5	4.0; 0	–	6.7
GAD3/Cs	15 Oct–4 Nov 2021	400	?	20.6; 7/8	29.8; 11	21.8; 8	5.5; 1/2	15.3; 5	4.4; 0	–	8.0
SyM Consulting/EPDA	20–23 Oct 2021	880	64.2	26.5; 10	34.3; 12/13	19.8; 7	1.1; 0	9.5; 3/5	4.4; 0	–	7.8
Demoscopia y Servicios/ESdiario	29 Sep–1 Oct 2021	?	68	26.0; 10	28.5; 10	20.3; 7	3.0; 0	16.3; 6	3.3; 0	–	2.5
GfK/Compromís	6–17 Sep 2021	900	?	26.6	27.1	23.4	9.4	9.9	1.7	–	0.5
SyM Consulting/EPDA	8–11 Sep 2021	818	?	26.5; 9/10	35.6; 13/14	19.1; 7	1.4; 0	9.1; 3	4.0; 0	–	9.1
Demoscopia y Servicios/ESdiario	21–25 Jun 2021	?	?	? 10	? 10	? 7	? 0	? 6	? 0	–	Tie
SyM Consulting/EPDA	2–3 Jun 2021	818	?	26.4; 9/10	33.5; 12/13	19.4; 7	2.0; 0	10.9; 4	3.9; 0	–	7.1
Sigma Dos/Las Provincias	14–17 May 2021	750	?	27.1; 9/10	34.8; 13/14	19.6; 7	4.1; 0	9.3; 3	3.3; 0	–	7.7
SyM Consulting/EPDA	5–10 May 2021	958	63.9	28.0; 10	24.5; 9	19.8; 7	5.4; 1/2	15.0; 5/6	3.6; 0	–	3.5
SyM Consulting/EPDA	8–11 Apr 2021	824	?	28.9; 10/11	25.7; 9	20.6; 7/8	7.3; 2	11.0; 4	3.4; 0	–	3.2
SyM Consulting/EPDA	4–6 Mar 2021	738	66.3	26.5; 9/10	24.4; 9	19.9; 7	10.6; 3/4	12.7; 4	3.1; 0	–	2.1
Demoscopia y Servicios/ESdiario	1–5 Mar 2021	1,800	67.0	27.3; 10	21.2; 7	21.0; 7	8.2; 3	17.4; 6	2.7; 0	–	6.1
SyM Consulting/EPDA	10–12 Feb 2021	748	66.1	25.8; 9	21.8; 7/8	18.7; 6/7	11.1; 4	16.4; 6	3.6; 0	–	4.0
SyM Consulting/EPDA	14–16 Jan 2021	605	?	24.6; 9	22.9; 8	21.6; 7/8	11.8; 4	13.2; 4/5	3.2; 0	–	1.7
Demoscopia y Servicios/ESdiario	1–7 Oct 2020	?	68.0	27.8; 10	24.3; 8	20.1; 7	11.0; 4	11.6; 4	3.1; 0	–	3.5
SyM Consulting/EPDA	5–6 Jun 2020	802	?	25.9; 9	28.7; 10	19.2; 6/7	7.0; 2/3	8.4; 3	7.0; 2	–	2.8
November 2019 general election	10 Nov 2019	—N/a	75.1	9.0 (3)	24.4 (8)	24.8 (9)	8.4 (3)	16.8 (6)	13.7 (4)	–	0.4
2019 municipal election	26 May 2019	—N/a	66.3	27.4; 10	21.8; 8	19.3; 7	17.6; 6	7.3; 2	4.2; 0	–	5.6

=== Voting preferences ===
The table below lists raw, unweighted voting preferences.

Polling firm/Commissioner	Fieldwork date	Sample size	Compromís	PP	PSPV	Cs	Vox	Unides Podem–EUPV	Question	X mark	Lead
2023 municipal election	28 May 2023	—N/a	17.2	26.2	13.6	1.7	9.1	1.7	—N/a	27.9	9.0
40dB/Prisa	12–17 May 2023	800	22.4	20.5	14.7	2.1	7.6	3.5	20.4	4.0	1.9
CIS	10–26 Apr 2023	1,056	23.1	21.7	14.4	0.8	8.2	2.7	23.7	2.0	1.4
PSPV	15 Apr 2023	800	16.5	26.5	22.5	1.8	7.7	2.7	20.8		4.0
GfK/City Council	Nov–Dec 2022	2,354	11.6	19.5	15.8	2.0	7.2	3.4	23.2	11.0	3.7
Sonmerca/City Council	Sep 2020	1,320	17.7	10.9	14.9	5.5	3.8	6.4	26.4	10.3	2.8
November 2019 general election (Note: Does not include non-resident citizens.)	10 Nov 2019	—N/a	6.7	18.2	18.5	6.2	12.5	10.3	—N/a	24.9	0.3
2019 municipal election	26 May 2019	—N/a	18.1	14.4	12.8	11.6	4.8	2.8	—N/a	33.7	3.7

=== Preferred Mayor ===
The table below lists opinion polling on leader preferences to become mayor of Valencia.

Polling firm/Commissioner	Fieldwork date	Sample size							Other/ None/ Not care	Question	Lead
Polling firm/Commissioner	Fieldwork date	Sample size	Ribó Compromís	Catalá PP	Gómez PSPV	Giner CS	Badenas Vox	Lima UP	Other/ None/ Not care	Question	Lead
40dB/Prisa	12–17 May 2023	800	30.3	23.2	12.9	2.4	6.8	2.3	9.0	13.2	7.1
GfK/Compromís	6–17 Sep 2021	900	26.0	19.0	15.0	–	–	–	40.0		7.0

== Results ==
← Summary of the 28 May 2023 City Council of Valencia election results →
Parties and alliances	Popular vote			Seats	
Parties and alliances	Votes	%	±pp	Total	+/−
People's Party (PP)	151,737	36.62	+14.84	13	+5
Commitment to Valencia: Agreement to Win (Acord per Guanyar)	99,382	23.98	−3.46	9	−1
Socialist Party of the Valencian Country (PSPV–PSOE)	78,655	18.98	−0.32	7	±0
Vox (Vox)	52,738	12.73	+5.48	4	+2
United We Can–United Left (Podem–EUPV)	9,694	2.34	−1.83	0	±0
Citizens–Party of the Citizenry (CS)	9,573	2.31	−15.30	0	−6
Animalist Party with the Environment (PACMA)^{1}	3,669	0.89	+0.06	0	±0
United Valencia (VLC)	1,756	0.42	New	0	±0
Blank Seats to Leave Empty Seats (EB)	867	0.21	+0.18	0	±0
For a Fairer World (PUM+J)	538	0.13	+0.08	0	±0
Decide (Decidix)	499	0.12	New	0	±0
Communist Party of the Peoples of Spain (PCPE)	487	0.12	+0.05	0	±0
Republican Left of the Valencian Country–Municipal Agreement (ERPV–AM)	363	0.09	+0.02	0	±0
Acting With You–Party for the Society (ACPS)	332	0.08	+0.04	0	±0
Spanish Phalanx of the CNSO (FE de las JONS)	167	0.04	+0.01	0	±0
Blank ballots	3,915	0.94	+0.55		
Total	414,372			33	±0
Valid votes	414,372	99.25	−0.45		
Invalid votes	3,140	0.75	+0.45		
Votes cast / turnout	417,512	72.08	+5.76		
Abstentions	161,693	27.92	−5.76		
Registered voters	579,205				
Sources
Footnotes: ^{1} Animalist Party with the Environment results are compared to Animalist Party Against Mistreatment of Animals totals in the 2019 election.

Popular vote
PP	36.62%
ApG	23.98%
PSPV–PSOE	18.98%
Vox	12.73%
Podem–EUPV	2.34%
CS	2.31%
Others	2.09%
Blank ballots	0.94%

Seats
PP	39.39%
ApG	27.27%
PSPV–PSOE	21.21%
Vox	12.12%

== Aftermath ==
=== Government formation ===
Investiture
Ballot →	15 June 2019	
Required majority →	17 out of 33	
María José Catalá (PP): • PP (13)	13 / 33	check
Joan Ribó (Compromís): • Compromís (9)	9 / 33	X mark
Sandra Gómez (PSPV): • PSPV (7)	7 / 33	X mark
Juan Manuel Badenas (Vox): • Vox (4)	4 / 33	X mark
Abstentions/Blank ballots	0 / 33	
Absentees	0 / 33	

== Bibliography ==
- Constitución Española (Constitution). Official State Gazette (in Spanish). 27 December 1978 [version as of 27 September 2011]. BOE-A-1978-31229.
- Ley 7/1985, de 2 de abril, Reguladora de las Bases del Régimen Local (Law 7/1985). Official State Gazette (in Spanish). 2 April 1985 [version as of 29 December 2021]. BOE-A-1985-5392.
- Ley Orgánica 5/1985, de 19 de junio, del Régimen Electoral General (Organic Law 5/1985). Official State Gazette (in Spanish). 19 June 1985 [version as of 3 October 2022]. BOE-A-1985-11672.
- Real Decreto 207/2023, de 3 de abril, por el que se convocan elecciones locales y a las Asambleas de Ceuta y Melilla para el 28 de mayo de 2023 (Royal Decree 207/2023). Official State Gazette (in Spanish). 3 April 2023. BOE-A-2023-8458.
