= Juan Manuel Badenas =

Spanish politician (born 1965)

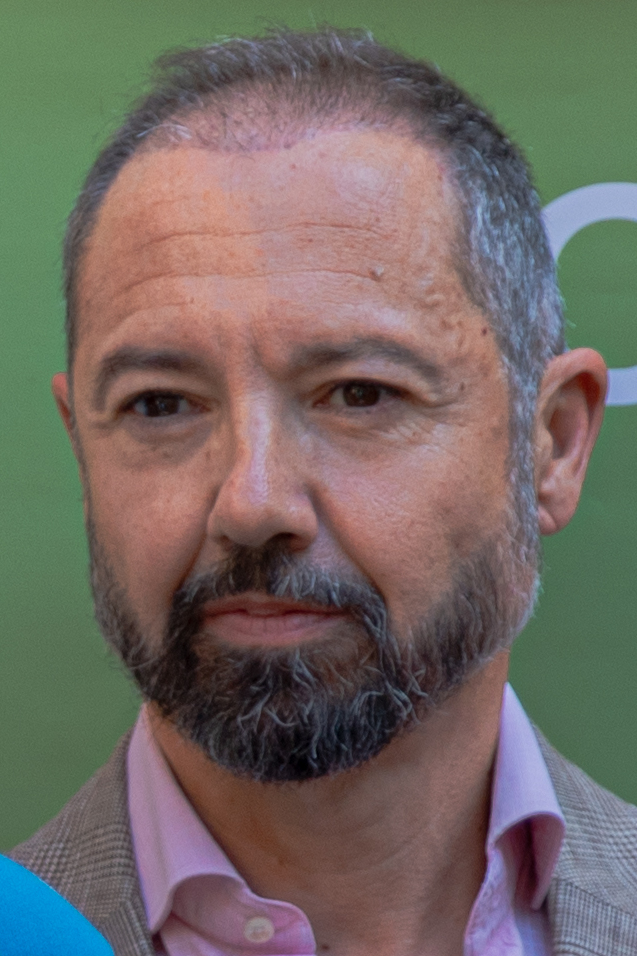

Juan Manuel Badenas Carpio (born 1965) is a Spanish politician of the party Vox. He led the party in the 2023 Valencia City Council election, after which it formed a coalition government with the People's Party and he became second deputy mayor.

== Biography ==
Born in Valencia, Badenas earned a degree and a doctorate in law. He was a rector at the International University of Valencia and a professor at the Jaume I University. His specialisms are in contract and business law. He has also been a substitute magistrate for the audiencia provincial courts of the provinces of Valencia and Castellón.

Badenas was a member of the People's Party (PP) and held positions in the Generalitat Valenciana, the government of the Valencian Community. In 2018, he joined Vox, and in February 2023 he was confirmed as their candidate for the 2023 Valencia City Council election. Vox rose from two seats to four in the city council, and after over four months of negotiations, formed a coalition majority government with the PP; mayor María José Catalá named Badenas as her second deputy.

In October 2023, Badenas used a flag of Spain to cover a grave accent on the name of the city in the city hall, so that it would be in Spanish and not in the language known locally as Valencian. He ordered the mayor to make the change on signage, letterheads and logos.

In November 2024, Badenas went on holiday with his partner, fellow Vox councillor Cecilia Herrero, during the cleanup operation after extensive flooding in Valencia. Opposition parties, the Socialist Party of the Valencian Country and Coalició Compromís, called on Catalá to remove the two from the local government.

In December 2024, a judge indicted Badenas for an alleged hate crime for having incorrectly attributed a murder to an immigrant; the legal complaint was made by the Socialist group on the council. Herrero was also indicted for Twitter messages, on the complaint of Compromís. Badenas described the investigations as political prosecutions.

In March 2025, Badenas was suspended by Vox over audio recordings in which he allegedly admitted to rigging the rules of a public contract for the benefit of his favoured company. Badenas – by now being investigated for criminal offences over the affair – and Herrero were reintegrated a month later, so that the government could keep its majority.
