= Teresa García Sena =

Spanish politician

Teresa García Sena (born 26 March 1977, in Valencia, Spain) is a Spanish politician affiliated with the main opposition People's Party (PP).

Unmarried, García holds a degree in law and served as legal advisor to the cabinet of the Valencian Regional Administration. For the 2008 election, she was placed tenth on the PP's list for the Spanish Congress of Deputies for Valencia region where the PP had won eight seats in the previous election. Although the PP gained an additional seat, García initially failed to be elected. However, as first substitute, she entered Congress on 14 October 2008 replacing María José Catalá.
