= 2015 Valencia municipal election =

Election in the Spanish municipality of Valencia

- 24 May 2015

All 33 seats in the City Council of Valencia 17 seats needed for a majority
- Opinion polls
- Registered: 582,804 ▲0.5%
- Turnout: 420,307 (72.1%) ▲2.7 pp
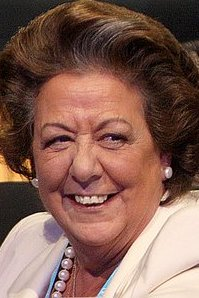

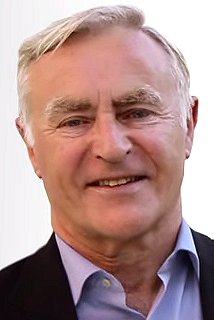

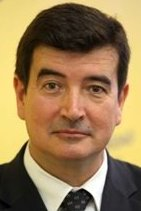

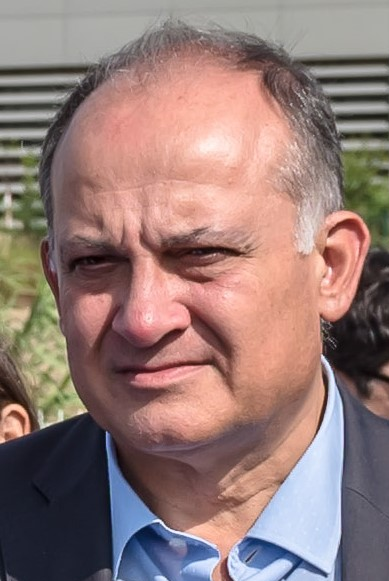

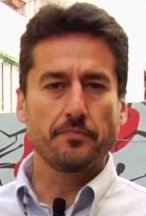

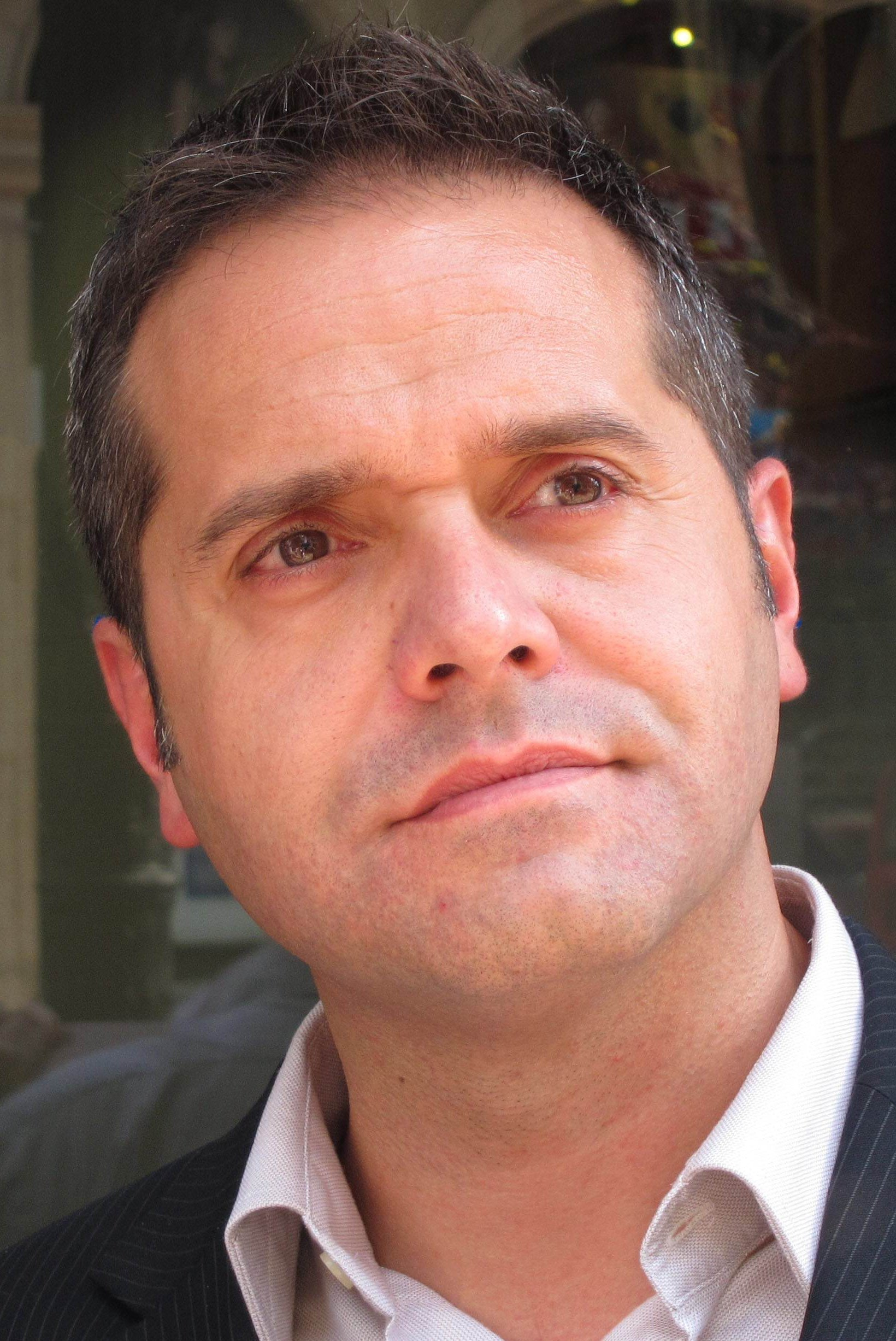
	First party	Second party	Third party
Leader	Rita Barberá	Joan Ribó	Fernando Giner
Party	PP	Compromís	C's
Leader since	1991	7 May 2010	28 March 2015
Last election	20 seats, 52.5%	3 seats, 9.0%	Did not contest
Seats won	10	9	6
Seat change	▼10	▲6	▲6
Popular vote	107,435	97,114	64,228
Percentage	25.8%	23.3%	15.4%
Swing	▼26.7 pp	▲14.3 pp	New party
	Fourth party	Fifth party	Sixth party
Leader	Joan Calabuig	Jordi Peris	Amadeu Sanchis
Party	PSPV–PSOE	VALC	Acord Ciutadà
Leader since	3 October 2010	10 April 2015	2004
Last election	8 seats, 21.8%	Did not contest	2 seats, 8.7% (Note: Results for EUPV (7.2%, 2 seats), VyE (1.3%, 0 seats) and ERPV–AM (0.2%, 0 seats) in the 2011 election.)
Seats won	5	3	0
Seat change	▼3	▲3	▼2
Popular vote	58,338	40,927	19,639
Percentage	14.0%	9.8%	4.7%
Swing	▼7.8 pp	New party	▼4.0 pp
Mayor before election
Rita Barberá
PP
Mayor after election
Joan Ribó
Compromís

A municipal election was held in Valencia on 24 May 2015 to elect the 10th City Council of the municipality. All 33 seats in the City Council were up for election. It was held concurrently with regional elections in thirteen autonomous communities and local elections all across Spain.

The unveiling of a string of corruption scandals during the 2011–2015 period involving the party in power, coupled with allegations of abuse of power and perceived poor management of the economic situation, had taken its toll in the ruling People's Party (PP), which went on to suffer a dramatic decline, losing over half of its vote share and city councillors and scoring its worst result since 1991. The scope of the PP collapse was such that incumbent mayor Rita Barberá was quoted saying "¡Qué hostia!" amid tears (Spanish for "What a smack!") after learning of the results in election night. As a result, the election turned into a surprisingly close race with the Valencianist coalition Compromís, which scored a strong second place. The Socialist Party of the Valencian Country (PSPV–PSOE), unable to capitalize on the PP losses, continued its long-term decline and fell to fourth place, with its votes being drawn away to both Compromís and newly created Podemos-led Valencia in Common coalition. Centrist Citizens (C's), contesting a Valencian municipal election for the first time, turned into the third political force through its capture of disenchanted PP voters, while historical United Left of the Valencian Country (EUPV), standing within the Acord Ciutadà coalition (Valencian for "Citizen Agreement"), failed to achieve enough votes to win seats on the local assembly.

As a result of the election, with the PP unable to command a majority of seats in the city council even with the support of C's, Barberá was ousted from office after 24 years of government, being succeeded by Compromís candidate Joan Ribó. The 2015 election marked the end of the two decade-long PP political dominance over both the city and the whole of the Valencian Community, losing control over the regional government, all provincial capitals and most major cities in the region to left-wing coalitions and alliances.

== Background ==
Rita Barberá of the People's Party (PP) was elected to a sixth term as mayor of Valencia after her party won a fifth consecutive absolute majority in the local assembly in the 2011 election. The then-ruling party of Spain, the Spanish Socialist Workers' Party (PSOE), had suffered a serious decline in popular support following Prime Minister José Luis Rodríguez Zapatero's approval of unpopular austerity measures to try to tackle the economic crisis that was beleaguering the country. The PP benefitted from the PSOE's collapse, which helped cement its landslide victory by an absolute majority of seats in the 2011 general election held on 20 November and paving the way for the investiture of Mariano Rajoy as new prime minister.

However, the PP in the city of Valencia had already shown signs of political wear in the 2011 election—suffering a slight decrease in support—as a result of Barberá's continuous tenure as city mayor since 1991, as well as the unveiling of the Gürtel affair in 2009. The scandal would result in regional president Francisco Camps's resignation in July 2011, just one month after taking office, with Alberto Fabra succeeding him as regional premier. The following years saw the unveiling of a series of corruption scandals affecting the PP, involving party deputies, mayors, local councillors, two Corts's speakers and former regional president José Luis Olivas. The regional party leadership also had to cope with accusations of illegal financing, as well as possible embezzlement offences in the additional costs incurred in the Formula 1 project and Pope Benedict XVI's 2006 visit to Valencia, accusations that also reached Barberá's local government.

At the same time, both the regional and local governments had to deal with the effects of an ongoing financial crisis. The regional executive was forced to ask for a bailout from the central government headed by Rajoy in July 2012, with its economic situation remaining severe because of high unemployment and debt. The decision of Fabra's government to close down RTVV, the regional public television broadcasting channel, because of financing issues, was also met with widespread protests.

The 2014 European Parliament election, which resulted in enormous losses for the PP in the entire Valencian Community, paved the way for the rise of new parties Podemos, Compromís and Citizens, with the PSOE local branch finding itself unable to gain anything from the PP's lost support. As a result, the ruling PP faced the 2015 election with a severe decline in popular support, an increase of electoral competitiveness and the shadow of corruption looming over the local PP leadership.

== Overview ==
Under the 1978 Constitution, the governance of municipalities in Spain—part of the country's local government system—was centered on the figure of city councils (Spanish: ayuntamientos), local corporations with independent legal personality composed of a mayor, a government council and an elected legislative assembly. The mayor was indirectly elected by the local assembly, requiring an absolute majority; otherwise, the candidate from the most-voted party automatically became mayor (ties were resolved by drawing lots). In the case of Valencia, the top-tier administrative and governing body was the City Council of Valencia.

=== Date ===
The term of local assemblies in Spain expired four years after the date of their previous election, with election day being fixed for the fourth Sunday of May every four years. The election decree was required to be issued no later than 54 days before the scheduled election date and published on the following day in the Official State Gazette (BOE). The previous local elections were held on 22 May 2011, setting the date for election day on the fourth Sunday of May four years later, which was 24 May 2015.

Local assemblies could not be dissolved before the expiration of their term, except in cases of mismanagement that seriously harmed the public interest and implied a breach of constitutional obligations, in which case the Council of Ministers could—optionally—decide to call a by-election.

Elections to the assemblies of local entities were officially called on 31 March 2015 with the publication of the corresponding decree in the BOE, setting election day for 24 May.

=== Electoral system ===
Voting for local assemblies was based on universal suffrage, comprising all Spanish nationals over 18 years of age, registered and residing in the municipality and with full political rights (provided that they had not been deprived of the right to vote by a final sentence, nor were legally incapacitated), as well as resident non-national European citizens, and those whose country of origin allowed reciprocal voting by virtue of a treaty.

Local councillors were elected using the D'Hondt method and closed-list proportional voting, with a five percent-threshold of valid votes (including blank ballots) in each municipality. Each municipality was a multi-member constituency, with a number of seats based on the following scale:

Population	Councillors
<100	3
101–250	5
251–1,000	7
1,001–2,000	9
2,001–5,000	11
5,001–10,000	13
10,001–20,000	17
20,001–50,000	21
50,001–100,000	25
>100,001	+1 per each 100,000 inhabitants or fraction +1 if total is an even number

The law did not provide for by-elections to fill vacant seats; instead, any vacancies arising after the proclamation of candidates and during the legislative term were filled by the next candidates on the party lists or, when required, by designated substitutes.

== Parties and candidates ==
The electoral law allowed for parties and federations registered in the interior ministry, alliances and groupings of electors to present lists of candidates. Parties and federations intending to form an alliance were required to inform the relevant electoral commission within 10 days of the election call, whereas groupings of electors needed to secure the signature of a determined amount of the electors registered in the municipality for which they sought election, disallowing electors from signing for more than one list. In the case of Valencia, as its population was between 300,001 and 1,000,000, at least 5,000 signatures were required. Additionally, a balanced composition of men and women was required in the electoral lists, so that candidates of either sex made up at least 40 percent of the total composition.

Below is a list of the main parties and alliances which contested the election:

Candidacy	Parties and alliances	Leading candidate	Ideology	Previous result		Gov.	Ref.
Candidacy	Parties and alliances	Leading candidate	Ideology	Vote %	Seats	Gov.	Ref.
PP	List: People's Party (PP)	Rita Barberá	Conservatism; Christian democracy	52.5%	20	Yes	
PSPV–PSOE	List: Socialist Party of the Valencian Country (PSPV–PSOE)	Joan Calabuig	Social democracy	21.8%	8	No	
Compromís	List: Valencian Nationalist Bloc (Bloc); Valencian People's Initiative (IdPV); Greens Equo of the Valencian Country (VerdsEquo)	Joan Ribó	Valencianism; Progressivism; Green politics	9.0%	3	No	
EUPV– EV–ERPV	List: United Left of the Valencian Country (EUPV) – Communist Party of the Valencian Country (PCPV) – The Dawn Marxist Organization (La Aurora (OM)) – Republican Left (IR) – Open Left (IzAb); The Greens of the Valencian Country (EVPV); Republican Left of the Valencian Country (ERPV)	Amadeu Sanchis	Valencianism; Democratic socialism Ecologism	8.7%	2	No	
VALC	List: We Can (Podemos/Podem)	Jordi Peris	Left-wing populism Direct democracy Democratic socialism	Did not contest		No	
C's	List: Citizens–Party of the Citizenry (C's)	Fernando Giner	Liberalism	Did not contest		No	

== Campaign ==
=== Party slogans ===
Party or alliance	Original slogan	English translation	Ref.
PP	« Trabajar. Hacer. Crecer. »	"Work. Do. Grow."	
PSPV–PSOE	« Gobernar para la mayoría »	"To govern for the majority"	
Compromís	« Amb valentia » « Con valentía »	"With courage"	
EUPV–EV–ERPV	« Es tiempo de izquierda » « És temps d'esquerres »	"It is the time of the left"	
UPyD	« Libres »	"Free"	
C's	« El cambio »	"The change"	
VALC	« Es ahora »	"It is now"	

=== Issues ===
In April 2015, Compromís denounced mayor Rita Barberá's expenses charged to public funds during 2011 and 2014, believing they could constitute an embezzlement offence as they were not related to municipal functions but to party and personal actions. The leaked bills, a total of 466 throughout the legislature amounting to expenditures of 278,000 euros, included payments for air travel, train tickets, car trips, hotels and restaurants. Compromís candidate Joan Ribó commented that "at a time when there are 85,000 unemployed in Valencia and it is the city with the highest number of evictions per capita, it is obscene, unsupportive and unethical to find all of these luxury expenses".

During the election campaign, the public prosecutor announced that it would open an investigation into Barberá's expenses, which would be linked to the already ongoing investigations on her because of luxury gifts worth 7,600 euros she would have allegedly received between 2007 and 2009 from a public body chaired by herself. The unveiling of such practices was dubbed as the "Ritaleaks case" by opposition parties—in reference to Rita Barberá's name—, which believed that such expenses were part of a larger scheme that maintained an illegal funding of the Valencian PP through public funds. The expenses scandal dominated the political landscape during the campaign, with Barberá herself being frequently booed during outdoor political acts in markets. She responded by saying she was being the target of a defamation campaign orchestrated by Compromís, and denied committing any wrongdoing or misuse of public money.

Another related scandal, the "Imelsa case", shook the PP campaign as EUPV leaked recordings allegedly belonging to public entity Imelsa former director, Marcos Benavent. Such recordings involved senior party officials, such as Xàtiva Mayor and President of the Valencia Deputation Alfonso Rus, in an alleged illegal financing network of the Valencian PP. The PP denounced Rus and expelled him from the party just 20 days ahead of the election, but he refused to withdraw as candidate and continued campaigning as an independent; the PP being unable to contest the local election in Xàtiva in a separate list.

== Opinion polls ==
The tables below list opinion polling results in reverse chronological order, showing the most recent first and using the dates when the survey fieldwork was done, as opposed to the date of publication. Where the fieldwork dates are unknown, the date of publication is given instead. The highest percentage figure in each polling survey is displayed with its background shaded in the leading party's colour. If a tie ensues, this is applied to the figures with the highest percentages. The "Lead" column on the right shows the percentage-point difference between the parties with the highest percentages in a poll.

=== Voting intention estimates ===
The table below lists weighted voting intention estimates. Refusals are generally excluded from the party vote percentages, while question wording and the treatment of "don't know" responses and those not intending to vote may vary between polling organisations. When available, seat projections determined by the polling organisations are displayed below (or in place of) the percentages in a smaller font; 17 seats were required for an absolute majority in the City Council of Valencia.

Color key:

Poll conducted after legal ban on opinion polls Exit poll

Polling firm/Commissioner	Fieldwork date	Sample size	Turnout	PP	PSPV	Compromís	AC	UPyD	VALC	C's	Vox	Lead
2015 municipal election	24 May 2015	—N/a	72.1	25.8; 10	14.0; 5	23.3; 9	4.7; 0	1.4; 0	9.8; 3	15.4; 6	0.8; 0	2.5
TNS Demoscopia/RTVE–FORTA	24 May 2015	?	?	? 11/12	? 5/6	? 5/6	–	–	? 4/5	? 5/6	–	?
GAD3/Antena 3	11–22 May 2015	?	?	? 11/12	? 6/7	? 5/6	–	–	? 4/5	? 5/6	–	?
Sigma Dos/El Mundo	13–14 May 2015	500	?	31.3; 11/12	13.8; 5	15.8; 5/6	5.2; 0/2	–	11.8; 4	16.7; 6	–	14.6
JM&A/Público	12 May 2015	?	?	? 12	? 6	? 4	–	–	? 6	? 5	–	?
Sigma Dos/Mediaset	4–7 May 2015	?	?	32.1; 11/12	14.2; 4/5	14.6; 5	? 0/1	–	10.4; 3	18.3; 6/7	–	13.8
GAD3/ABC	29 Apr–5 May 2015	500	?	30.1; 11	15.8; 5	15.6; 5	5.8; 2	0.5; 0	11.8; 4	16.2; 6	–	13.9
JM&A/Público	3 May 2015	?	?	29.2; 11	15.3; 6	12.1; 4	4.9; 0	1.2; 0	17.3; 6	16.1; 6	–	11.9
Invest Group/Levante-EMV	22–30 Apr 2015	600	?	26.3; 9/10	13.1; 4/5	17.2; 6	7.6; 2	–	15.7; 5	16.9; 6	–	9.1
Sigma Dos/Las Provincias	22–23 Apr 2015	400	?	29.3; 11	14.6; 5	11.6; 4	7.6; 2	0.9; 0	12.2; 4	19.4; 7	–	9.9
MyWord/Cadena SER	16–21 Apr 2015	500	?	26.4; 9/10	13.1; 4/5	13.9; 4/5	5.4; 1/2	1.1; 0	16.2; 5/6	19.1; 6/7	–	7.3
CIS	23 Mar–19 Apr 2015	710	?	35.7; 13	15.9; 6	10.4; 4	4.5; 0	2.1; 0	13.2; 5	14.4; 5	–	19.8
Metroscopia/El País	13–15 Apr 2015	600	75	23.5; 8	13.9; 5	12.2; 4	6.0; 2	–	18.2; 6	22.0; 8	–	1.5
Sigma Dos/El Mundo	26–27 Mar 2015	500	?	31.8; 11/13	14.6; 5/6	12.0; 4	4.4; 0	1.6; 0	15.8; 5/6	16.7; 6	–	15.1
Sigma Dos/Las Provincias	13–16 Mar 2015	500	?	30.3; 11/12	13.4; 4/5	14.6; 5	7.1; 2	4.7; 0/1	15.5; 5/6	11.3; 4	–	14.8
ODEC/PSPV	3–15 Mar 2015	1,000	?	27.9– 28.4; 10	20.0– 20.3; 7	12.9– 13.5; 5	5.1– 5.3; 1	2.2– 2.4; 0	13.0– 13.5; 5	13.1– 13.4; 5	0.6– 0.9; 0	7.9– 8.1
PP	24 Feb 2015	800	?	? 15/16	? 6/7	? 2/3	? 1	? 0/1	? 5/6	? 1/2	–	?
Llorente & Cuenca	31 Oct 2014	?	?	? 13/16	? 6/8	? 3/4	? 1/2	? 1	? 5/7	–	–	?
2014 EP election	25 May 2014	—N/a	53.6	28.3 (12)	16.8 (7)	9.0 (3)	11.2 (4)	9.5 (4)	8.6 (3)	3.6 (0)	3.1 (0)	11.5
Compromís	27–29 Mar 2013	?	?	34.7; 13	15.1; 5	15.2; 5	14.1; 5	14.0; 5	–	–	–	19.5
PSPV	Dec 2012	500	?	33.0; 13	22.8; 8	13.5; 5	8.9; 3	11.6; 4	–	–	–	10.2
2011 general election	20 Nov 2011	—N/a	75.9	52.5 (19)	23.9 (8)	5.9 (2)	7.2 (2)	7.5 (2)	–	–	–	28.6
2011 municipal election	22 May 2011	—N/a	69.4	52.5; 20	21.8; 8	9.0; 3	7.2; 2	2.8; 0	–	–	–	30.7

=== Voting preferences ===
The table below lists raw, unweighted voting preferences.

Polling firm/Commissioner	Fieldwork date	Sample size	PP	PSPV	Compromís	AC	UPyD	VALC	C's	Vox	Question	X mark	Lead
2015 municipal election	24 May 2015	—N/a	18.4	10.0	16.7	3.4	1.0	7.0	11.0	0.6	—N/a	27.9	1.7
Invest Group/Levante-EMV	22–30 Apr 2015	600	17.0	7.9	11.2	4.6	0.7	10.0	12.0	0.2	25.8	6.4	5.0
MyWord/Cadena SER	16–21 Apr 2015	500	10.3	7.2	13.6	2.5	0.8	7.6	14.6	–	32.0	6.0	1.0
CIS	23 Mar–19 Apr 2015	710	16.8	9.9	8.7	4.1	1.8	10.8	9.0	–	29.3	6.6	6.0
2014 EP election (Note: Does not include non-resident citizens.)	25 May 2014	—N/a	14.9	8.9	4.7	5.9	5.0	4.5	1.9	1.6	—N/a	46.4	5.0
PSPV	Dec 2012	500	20.5	13.8	8.5	7.1	7.4	–	–	–	–	–	6.7
2011 general election	20 Nov 2011	—N/a	39.4	18.0	4.4	5.4	5.6	–	–	–	—N/a	24.1	21.4
2011 municipal election	22 May 2011	—N/a	36.0	14.9	6.2	4.9	1.9	–	–	–	—N/a	30.6	30.7

=== Victory preferences ===
The table below lists opinion polling on the victory preferences for each party in the event of a municipal election taking place.

Polling firm/Commissioner	Fieldwork date	Sample size	PP	PSPV	Compromís	AC	UPyD	VALC	C's	Other/ None	Question	Lead
Invest Group/Levante-EMV	22–30 Apr 2015	600	18.0	8.2	12.8	4.4	0.8	9.5	12.7	7.1	21.5	5.2

=== Victory likelihood ===
The table below lists opinion polling on the perceived likelihood of victory for each party in the event of a municipal election taking place.

Polling firm/Commissioner	Fieldwork date	Sample size	PP	PSPV	Compromís	AC	VALC	C's	Other/ None	Question	Lead
Invest Group/Levante-EMV	22–30 Apr 2015	600	58.1	4.5	2.5	0.2	1.7	2.3	7.1	24.9	53.6

=== Preferred Mayor ===
The table below lists opinion polling on leader preferences to become mayor of Valencia.

Polling firm/Commissioner	Fieldwork date	Sample size							Other/ None/ Not care	Question	Lead
Polling firm/Commissioner	Fieldwork date	Sample size	Barberá PP	Calabuig PSPV	Ribó Compromís	Sanchis AC	Peris VALC	Giner C's	Other/ None/ Not care	Question	Lead
GAD3/ABC	29 Apr–5 May 2015	500	16.5	7.5	7.0	4.9	1.7	12.7	20.7	29.0	3.8

== Results ==
← Summary of the 24 May 2015 City Council of Valencia election results →
Parties and alliances	Popular vote			Seats	
Parties and alliances	Votes	%	±pp	Total	+/−
People's Party (PP)	107,435	25.77	−26.77	10	−10
Commitment to Valencia: Commitment (Compromís)	97,114	23.30	+14.27	9	+6
Citizens–Party of the Citizenry (C's)	64,228	15.41	New	6	+6
Socialist Party of the Valencian Country (PSPV–PSOE)	58,338	14.00	−7.76	5	−3
Valencia in Common (VALC)	40,927	9.82	New	3	+3
Citizen Agreement (EUPV–EV–ERPV)^{1}	19,639	4.71	−4.01	0	−2
Union, Progress and Democracy (UPyD)	5,757	1.38	−1.45	0	±0
Animalist Party Against Mistreatment of Animals (PACMA)	4,518	1.08	+0.63	0	±0
Vox (Vox)	3,353	0.80	New	0	±0
We Are Valencian (SOMVAL)	2,976	0.71	New	0	±0
Democratic People (Poble)	2,877	0.69	New	0	±0
Spain 2000 (E–2000)	1,391	0.33	−0.15	0	±0
Blank Seats (EB)	773	0.19	New	0	±0
Together (Junts)^{2}	646	0.15	+0.08	0	±0
Forward (Avant)	542	0.13	New	0	±0
United for Valencia (UxV)	511	0.12	−0.05	0	±0
Communist Party of the Peoples of Spain (PCPE)	446	0.11	±0.00	0	±0
Neo-Democrats (Neodemócratas)	307	0.07	New	0	±0
Republican Social Movement (MSR)	270	0.06	New	0	±0
Libertarian Party (P–LIB)	228	0.05	New	0	±0
Blank ballots	4,568	1.10	−1.08		
Total	416,844			33	±0
Valid votes	416,844	99.18	+0.46		
Invalid votes	3,463	0.82	−0.46		
Votes cast / turnout	420,307	72.12	+2.71		
Abstentions	162,497	27.88	−2.71		
Registered voters	582,804				
Sources
Footnotes: ^{1} Citizen Agreement results are compared to the combined totals of United Left of the Valencian Country, Greens and Eco-pacifists and Republican Left of the Valencian Country in the 2011 election.; ^{2} Together results are compared to Valencian Nationalist Left–European Valencianist Party totals in the 2011 election.

Popular vote
PP	25.77%
Compromís	23.30%
C's	15.41%
PSPV–PSOE	14.00%
VALC	9.82%
Acord Ciutadà	4.71%
UPyD	1.38%
PACMA	1.08%
Others	3.44%
Blank ballots	1.10%

Seats
PP	30.30%
Compromís	27.27%
C's	18.18%
PSPV–PSOE	15.15%
VALC	9.09%

== Aftermath ==
=== Government formation ===
As election results were known, mayor Rita Barberá conceded defeat to Joan Ribó from Compromís, whose surprise results—9 city councillors and 23.3% of the vote—allowed him to be appointed as new Mayor through an alliance with both the PSPV–PSOE and VALC, as all three commanded an absolute majority of seats together. The PP had hoped to rely on support from newcomer C's, but its 6 seats, together with the PP's 10, meant that they fell one seat short of an overall majority. Compromís's historic result came mostly at the cost of a declining PSOE, which fell to fourth place and obtained its worst result in history. In her concession speech, Barberá stated that "I come with dignity, pride and gratitude to all Valencians that have allowed me to be mayor for 24 years", commenting on her party's result—which lost over half of its 2011 vote and city councillors—that "it is a bad result, I will not hide from it". The shock from the PP collapse was such that, in a spontaneous reaction after learning of the results in election night, a tearful Barberá was recorded by cameras as saying "¡Qué hostia!...¡Qué hostia!" (Spanish for "What a smack!... what a smack!") while embracing a party colleague.

As a result of the three left-from-centre parties reaching an agreement to take power over the city, Joan Ribó was appointed as new mayor of Valencia on 13 June 2015 thanks to the votes of Compromís, the PSPV and VALC. Barberá, who had renounced her seat in the city council the previous day, did not attend Ribó's appointment. The new PP local leader, Alfonso Novo, congratulated Ribó on his election and said the PP would maintain "institutional loyalty, but also firmness and exemplariness" in the new party's role as "opposition and control".

Just seven months later, on 26 January 2016, a major police operation in Valencia would result in the arrest of several high-ranking members from the Valencian PP regional and local branches, as a consequence of the ongoing investigation on the PP's corruption in the region during its time in government. Several days later, on 1 February, all ten PP city councillors in the city council of Valencia, including Novo himself, would be charged for a money laundering offence, related to the party's illegal financing in the Valencian Community. Judicial investigation pointed to former Mayor Rita Barberá also being involved in the scandal—that also covered the possible illegal funding of her 2015 election run—with her arrest or imputation only being prevented by the fact she had legal protection as an incumbent senator.

Investiture
Ballot →	13 June 2015	
Required majority →	17 out of 33	
Joan Ribó (Compromís): • Compromís (9); • PSPV (5); • VALC (3)	17 / 33	check
Alfonso Novo (PP): • PP (10)	10 / 33	X mark
Fernando Giner (C's): • C's (6)	6 / 33	X mark
Abstentions/Blank ballots	0 / 33	
Absentees	0 / 33	

== Bibliography ==
- Constitución Española (Constitution). Official State Gazette (in Spanish). 27 December 1978 [version as of 27 September 2011]. BOE-A-1978-31229.
- Ley 7/1985, de 2 de abril, Reguladora de las Bases del Régimen Local (Law 7/1985). Official State Gazette (in Spanish). 2 April 1985 [version as of 30 December 2013]. BOE-A-1985-5392.
- Ley Orgánica 5/1985, de 19 de junio, del Régimen Electoral General (Organic Law 5/1985). Official State Gazette (in Spanish). 19 June 1985 [version as of 31 March 2015]. BOE-A-1985-11672.
- Real Decreto 233/2015, de 30 de marzo, por el que se convocan elecciones locales y a las Asambleas de Ceuta y Melilla para el 24 de mayo de 2015 (Royal Decree 233/2015). Official State Gazette (in Spanish). 30 March 2015. BOE-A-2015-3448.
