= 2019 Valencia municipal election =

Election in the Spanish municipality of Valencia

- 26 May 2019

All 33 seats in the City Council of Valencia 17 seats needed for a majority
- Opinion polls
- Registered: 586,624 ▲0.7%
- Turnout: 389,057 (66.3%) ▼5.8 pp
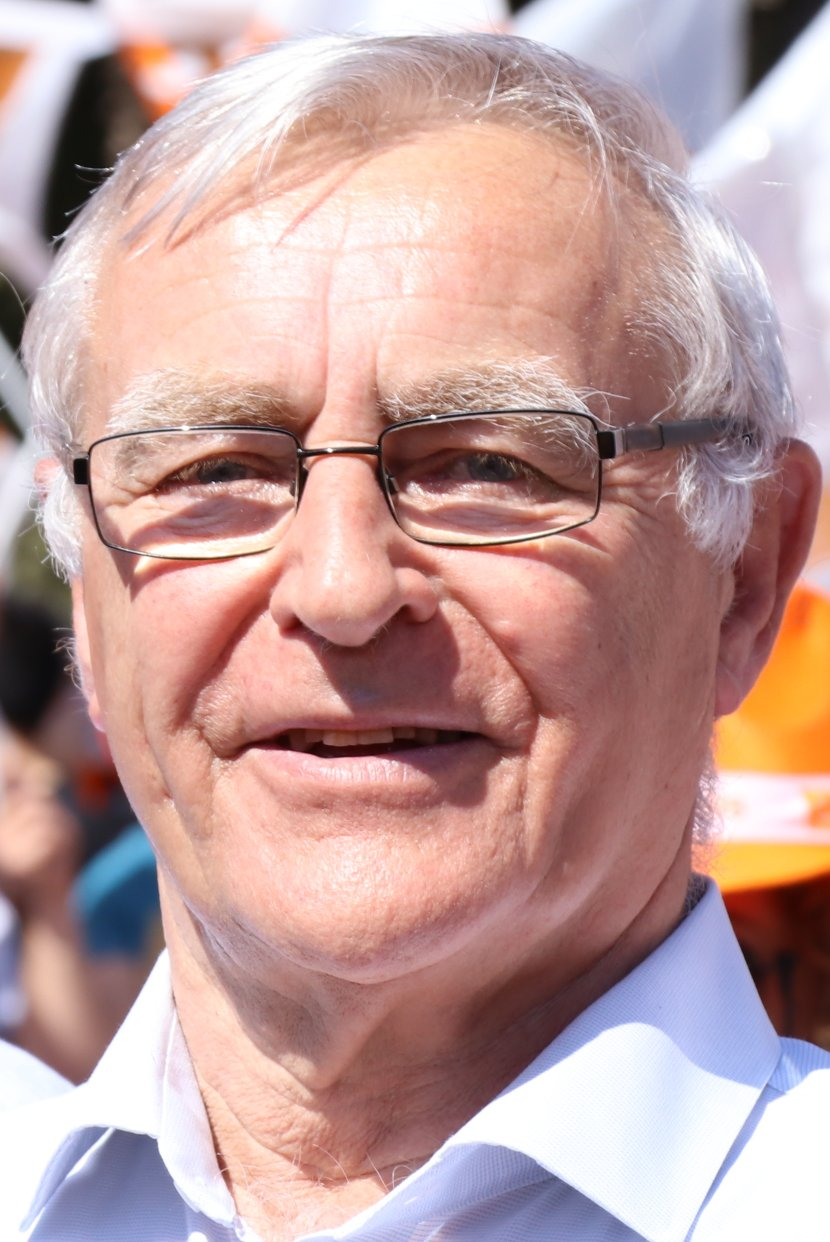

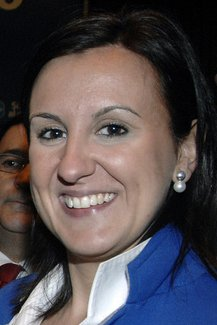

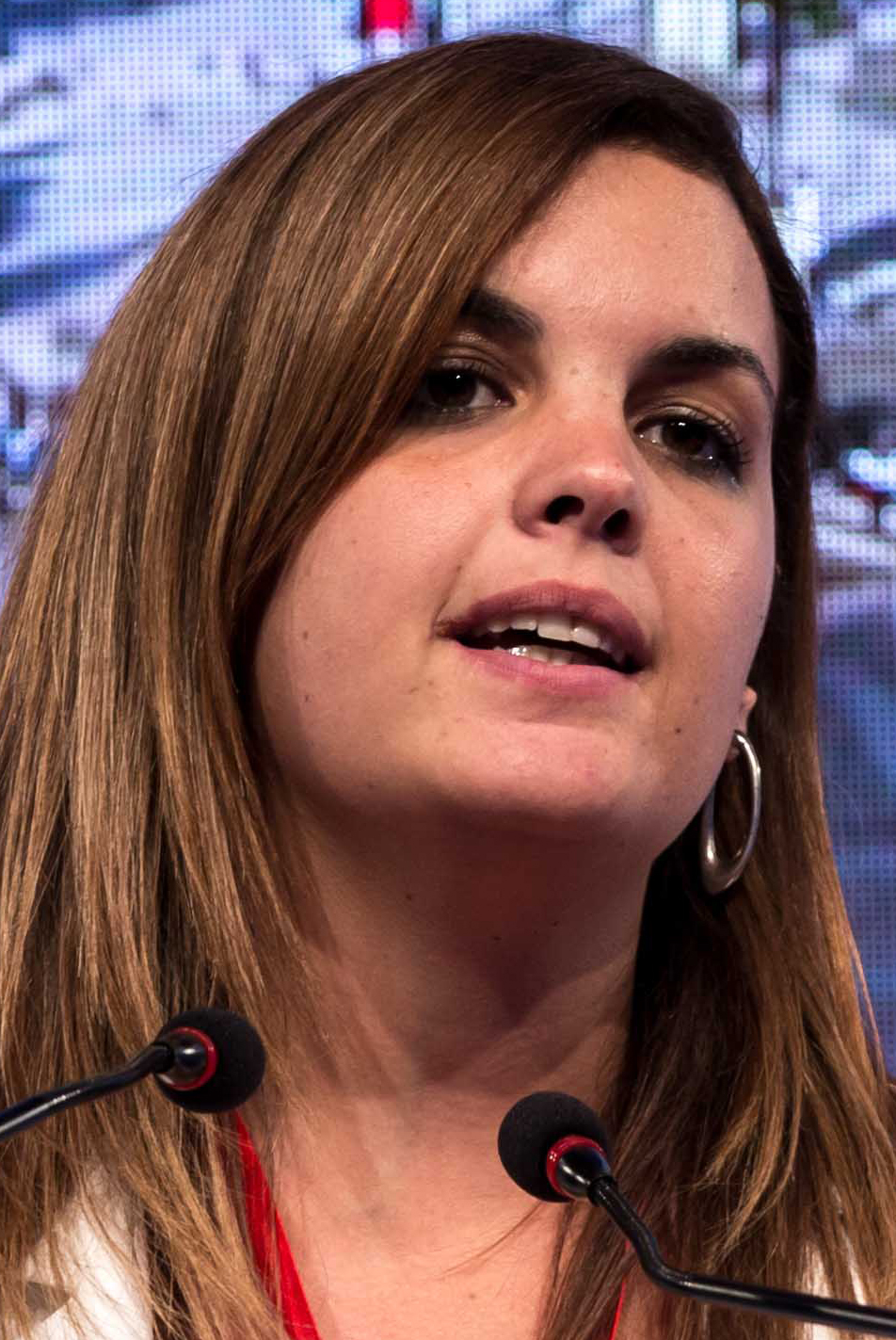

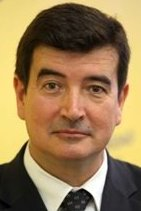

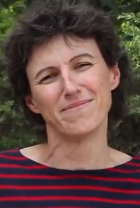
	First party	Second party	Third party
Leader	Joan Ribó	María José Catalá	Sandra Gómez
Party	Compromís	PP	PSPV–PSOE
Leader since	7 May 2010	12 January 2019	14 October 2018
Last election	9 seats, 23.3%	10 seats, 25.8%	5 seats, 14.0%
Seats won	10	8	7
Seat change	▲1	▼2	▲2
Popular vote	106,430	84,491	74,848
Percentage	27.4%	21.8%	19.3%
Swing	▲4.1 pp	▼4.0 pp	▲5.3 pp
	Fourth party	Fifth party	Sixth party
Leader	Fernando Giner	José Gosálbez	María Oliver
Party	Cs	Vox	Podem–EUPV
Leader since	28 March 2015	21 April 2019	27 November 2018
Last election	6 seats, 15.4%	0 seats, 0.8%	3 seats, 14.5% (Note: Results for VALC (9.8%, 3 seats) and EUPV–EV–ERPV (4.7%, 0 seats) in the 2015 election.)
Seats won	6	2	0
Seat change	0	▲2	▼3
Popular vote	68,293	28,139	16,176
Percentage	17.6%	7.3%	4.2%
Swing	▲2.2 pp	▲6.5 pp	▼10.3 pp
Mayor before election
Joan Ribó
Compromís
Mayor after election
Joan Ribó
Compromís

A municipal election was held in Valencia on 26 May 2019 to elect the 11th City Council of the municipality. All 33 seats in the City Council were up for election. It was held concurrently with regional elections in twelve autonomous communities and local elections all across Spain, as well as the 2019 European Parliament election.

The election saw the Coalició Compromís of incumbent mayor Joan Ribó score its first electoral win in the city in history, with the opposition People's Party (PP) under former regional minister María José Catalá scoring its worst result since 1987. This was also the first election since 1987 without the presence of Rita Barberá, the former PP mayor between 1991 and 2015 who had died in November 2016. The Socialist Party of the Valencian Country (PSPV–PSOE) recovered somewhat and clung into third place with 19.3% and 7 councillors. The election also resulted in a stagnation for the liberal Citizens (Cs), the entry of the far-right Vox party for the first time and the Unidas Podemos alliance—comprising both Podemos and United Left of the Valencian Country (EUPV)—not reaching the minimum five percent threshold to be entitled to seat allocation.

With the left-from-centre parties—Compromís and PSOE—securing an overall majority of seats against the combined PP–Cs–Vox bloc, Ribó was able to be re-elected for a second term in office as city mayor.

== Overview ==
Under the 1978 Constitution, the governance of municipalities in Spain—part of the country's local government system—was centered on the figure of city councils (Spanish: ayuntamientos), local corporations with independent legal personality composed of a mayor, a government council and an elected legislative assembly. The mayor was indirectly elected by the local assembly, requiring an absolute majority; otherwise, the candidate from the most-voted party automatically became mayor (ties were resolved by drawing lots). In the case of Valencia, the top-tier administrative and governing body was the City Council of Valencia.

=== Date ===
The term of local assemblies in Spain expired four years after the date of their previous election, with election day being fixed for the fourth Sunday of May every four years. The election decree was required to be issued no later than 54 days before the scheduled election date and published on the following day in the Official State Gazette (BOE). The previous local elections were held on 24 May 2015, setting the date for election day on the fourth Sunday of May four years later, which was 26 May 2019.

Local assemblies could not be dissolved before the expiration of their term, except in cases of mismanagement that seriously harmed the public interest and implied a breach of constitutional obligations, in which case the Council of Ministers could—optionally—decide to call a by-election.

Elections to the assemblies of local entities were officially called on 2 April 2019 with the publication of the corresponding decree in the BOE, setting election day for 26 May.

=== Electoral system ===
Voting for local assemblies was based on universal suffrage, comprising all Spanish nationals over 18 years of age, registered and residing in the municipality and with full political rights (provided that they had not been deprived of the right to vote by a final sentence), (Note: Amendments in 2018 granted the right to vote to those legally incapacitated.) as well as resident non-national European citizens, and those whose country of origin allowed reciprocal voting by virtue of a treaty.

Local councillors were elected using the D'Hondt method and closed-list proportional voting, with a five percent-threshold of valid votes (including blank ballots) in each municipality. Each municipality was a multi-member constituency, with a number of seats based on the following scale:

Population	Councillors
<100	3
101–250	5
251–1,000	7
1,001–2,000	9
2,001–5,000	11
5,001–10,000	13
10,001–20,000	17
20,001–50,000	21
50,001–100,000	25
>100,001	+1 per each 100,000 inhabitants or fraction +1 if total is an even number

The law did not provide for by-elections to fill vacant seats; instead, any vacancies arising after the proclamation of candidates and during the legislative term were filled by the next candidates on the party lists or, when required, by designated substitutes.

=== Outgoing council ===
The table below shows the composition of the political groups in the local assembly at the time of the election call.

Council composition in April 2019
Groups	Parties	Councillors	
Groups	Parties	Seats	Total
People's Municipal Group	PP	10	10
Commitment to Valencia Municipal Group	Compromís	9	9
Citizens Municipal Group	Cs	5	5
Socialist Municipal Group	PSPV–PSOE	5	5
Valencia in Common Municipal Group	Podemos	3	3
Non-Inscrits	INDEP	1 (Note: María Dolores Jiménez, former Cs councillor.)	1

== Parties and candidates ==
The electoral law allowed for parties and federations registered in the interior ministry, alliances and groupings of electors to present lists of candidates. Parties and federations intending to form an alliance were required to inform the relevant electoral commission within 10 days of the election call, whereas groupings of electors needed to secure the signature of a determined amount of the electors registered in the municipality for which they sought election, disallowing electors from signing for more than one list. In the case of Valencia, as its population was between 300,001 and 1,000,000, at least 5,000 signatures were required. Additionally, a balanced composition of men and women was required in the electoral lists, so that candidates of either sex made up at least 40 percent of the total composition.

Below is a list of the main parties and alliances which contested the election:

Candidacy	Parties and alliances	Leading candidate	Ideology	Previous result		Gov.	Ref.
Candidacy	Parties and alliances	Leading candidate	Ideology	Vote %	Seats	Gov.	Ref.
PP	List: People's Party (PP)	María José Catalá	Conservatism; Christian democracy	25.8%	10	No	
Compromís	List: Valencian Nationalist Bloc (Bloc); Valencian People's Initiative (IdPV); Greens Equo of the Valencian Country (VerdsEquo)	Joan Ribó	Valencianism; Progressivism; Green politics	23.3%	9	Yes	
Cs	List: Citizens–Party of the Citizenry (Cs)	Fernando Giner	Liberalism	15.4%	6	No	
PSPV–PSOE	List: Socialist Party of the Valencian Country (PSPV–PSOE)	Sandra Gómez	Social democracy	14.0%	5	Yes	
Podem–EUPV	List: We Can (Podemos/Podem); United Left of the Valencian Country (EUPV) – Communist Party of the Valencian Country (PCPV) – The Dawn. Marxist Organization OM (La Aurora (om)) – Republican Left (IR) – Feminist Party of Spain (PFE)	María Oliver	Left-wing populism Direct democracy Democratic socialism	14.5%	3	Yes	
Vox	List: Vox (Vox)	José Gosálbez	Right-wing populism Ultranationalism; National conservatism	0.8%	0	No	

== Opinion polls ==
The tables below list opinion polling results in reverse chronological order, showing the most recent first and using the dates when the survey fieldwork was done, as opposed to the date of publication. Where the fieldwork dates are unknown, the date of publication is given instead. The highest percentage figure in each polling survey is displayed with its background shaded in the leading party's colour. If a tie ensues, this is applied to the figures with the highest percentages. The "Lead" column on the right shows the percentage-point difference between the parties with the highest percentages in a poll.

=== Voting intention estimates ===
The table below lists weighted voting intention estimates. Refusals are generally excluded from the party vote percentages, while question wording and the treatment of "don't know" responses and those not intending to vote may vary between polling organisations. When available, seat projections determined by the polling organisations are displayed below (or in place of) the percentages in a smaller font; 17 seats were required for an absolute majority in the City Council of Valencia.

Color key:

Poll conducted after legal ban on opinion polls

Polling firm/Commissioner	Fieldwork date	Sample size	Turnout	PP	Compromís	Cs	PSPV	VALC	EUPV	PACMA	Vox	Som	Unides Podem–EUPV	Lead
2019 municipal election	26 May 2019	—N/a	66.3	21.8; 8	27.4; 10	17.6; 6	19.3; 7	(Note: Within Unidas Podemos.)		0.8; 0	7.3; 2	0.4; 0	4.2; 0	5.6
SyM Consulting/EPDA	24–26 May 2019	781	?	19.9; 7	21.7; 8	15.5; 6	20.1; 7/8			–	7.5; 2/3	–	5.5; 2	1.6
ElectoPanel/Electomanía	22–23 May 2019	?	?	19.5; 7	23.8; 8	18.0; 6	22.1; 8			–	7.7; 2	1.1; 0	7.0; 2	1.7
ElectoPanel/Electomanía	21–22 May 2019	?	?	19.8; 7	23.9; 8	17.8; 6	22.0; 8			–	7.4; 2	1.1; 0	7.1; 2	1.9
ElectoPanel/Electomanía	20–21 May 2019	?	?	19.7; 7	23.5; 8	17.8; 6	22.2; 8			–	7.5; 2	1.0; 0	7.3; 2	1.3
ElectoPanel/Electomanía	19–20 May 2019	?	?	19.7; 7	23.4; 8	18.2; 6	22.4; 8			–	7.2; 2	1.1; 0	7.2; 2	1.0
GIPEyOP	7–20 May 2019	545	?	15.4; 5	25.2; 9	24.8; 8	18.3; 6			0.3; 0	8.5; 3	–	6.8; 2	0.4
KeyData/Público	19 May 2019	?	69.4	18.3; 7	22.7; 8	19.4; 7	20.0; 7			0.7; 0	7.7; 2	–	6.3; 2	2.7
ElectoPanel/Electomanía	16–19 May 2019	?	?	19.9; 7	23.3; 8	17.7; 6	22.6; 8			–	6.8; 2	1.3; 0	7.4; 2	0.7
IMOP/El Confidencial	13–16 May 2019	800	73	18.3; 6/7	25.5; 9	18.1; 6/7	18.2; 6/7			–	9.2; 3	–	6.9; 2	7.2
ElectoPanel/Electomanía	13–16 May 2019	?	?	19.5; 7	23.1; 8	18.4; 6	22.3; 8			–	7.3; 2	1.5; 0	7.0; 2	0.8
Sigma Dos/El Mundo	13–16 May 2019	400	?	20.4; 7/8	24.4; 8/9	16.8; 5/6	23.1; 8/9			–	5.0; 1	–	6.1; 2	1.3
ElectoPanel/Electomanía	10–13 May 2019	?	?	19.3; 7	22.0; 8	19.2; 6	21.1; 7			–	8.8; 3	1.8; 0	6.5; 2	0.9
SyM Consulting/EPDA	10–12 May 2019	808	?	14.7; 6	23.6; 8	16.5; 6	24.6; 9			–	5.7; 2	–	5.3; 2	1.0
ElectoPanel/Electomanía	7–10 May 2019	?	?	19.7; 7	21.3; 7	19.9; 7	20.3; 7			–	9.4; 3	1.7; 0	7.0; 2	1.0
Sigma Dos/Las Provincias	6–9 May 2019	500	?	20.5; 7/8	23.6; 8/9	15.3; 5	22.9; 7/8			–	6.5; 2	–	8.2; 2/3	0.7
Invest Group/Prensa Ibérica	2–9 May 2019	700	?	18.1; 6	23.9; 8/9	15.5; 5	26.7; 9/10			–	5.3; 1/2	–	8.3; 2/3	2.8
40 dB/El País	3–8 May 2019	804	?	17.1; 6	26.3; 9/10	18.1; 6	18.6; 6/7			–	5.5; 2	–	9.9; 3	7.7
ElectoPanel/Electomanía	4–7 May 2019	?	?	18.5; 7	20.9; 7	20.4; 7	20.5; 7			–	9.7; 3	1.8; 0	6.8; 2	0.4
SyM Consulting/Valencia Plaza	3–5 May 2019	714	?	20.1; 7	22.9; 8	15.8; 5/6	23.2; 8			–	5.1; 1/2	–	9.7; 3	0.3
ElectoPanel/Electomanía	29 Apr–4 May 2019	?	?	18.3; 7	20.3; 7	20.8; 7	20.7; 7			–	9.5; 3	1.9; 0	6.9; 2	0.1
2019 regional election	28 Apr 2019	—N/a	77.9	18.4 (6)	20.9 (7)	18.9 (7)	19.7 (7)			1.4 (0)	10.7 (4)	0.5 (0)	6.9 (2)	1.2
April 2019 general election	28 Apr 2019	—N/a	78.2	18.5 (6)	7.8 (2)	18.8 (7)	25.1 (9)			1.5 (0)	12.1 (4)	0.3 (0)	14.6 (5)	6.3
CIS	21 Mar–23 Apr 2019	479	?	17.2; 6/7	26.5; 9/11	13.6; 6/7	19.5; 7			2.1; 0	7.7; 1/2	–	10.9; 3/4	7.0
ElectoPanel/Electomanía	31 Mar–7 Apr 2019	?	?	21.9; 8	21.7; 8	12.2; 4	20.8; 7			–	12.0; 4	2.8; 0	6.9; 2	0.2
ElectoPanel/Electomanía	24–31 Mar 2019	?	?	21.6; 8	21.6; 8	12.7; 4	20.7; 7			–	11.9; 4	2.8; 0	6.9; 2	Tie
ElectoPanel/Electomanía	17–24 Mar 2019	?	?	21.7; 8	22.0; 8	12.3; 4	21.6; 7			–	11.3; 4	3.0; 0	6.7; 2	0.3
ElectoPanel/Electomanía	10–17 Mar 2019	?	?	22.0; 8	21.5; 8	11.7; 4	20.8; 7			–	13.0; 4	2.7; 0	6.9; 2	0.5
ElectoPanel/Electomanía	3–10 Mar 2019	?	?	21.9; 8	21.6; 8	12.2; 4	20.2; 7			–	13.0; 4	2.9; 0	7.0; 2	0.3
ElectoPanel/Electomanía	22 Feb–3 Mar 2019	?	?	22.3; 8	22.0; 8	14.4; 5	20.1; 7			–	9.1; 3	3.1; 0	7.0; 2	0.3
SyM Consulting/EPDA	14–15 Feb 2019	624	?	21.5; 8	23.0; 8	10.7; 4	15.7; 6			1.3; 0	14.1; 5	2.3; 0	7.1; 2	1.5
SyM Consulting/Valencia Plaza	15–17 Jan 2019	624	?	26.1; 9/10	20.7; 7	12.3; 4	21.7; 7/8			–	9.3; 3	–	5.6; 2	4.4
GfK/Compromís	17–20 Dec 2018	908	?	16.2; 5/6	27.6; 10	21.4; 7	17.0; 6			–	6.9; 2	–	8.2; 2/3	6.2
SyM Consulting/EPDA	15–17 Dec 2018	600	68.0	22.3; 8/9	14.1; 5	20.6; 8	16.6; 6/7	5.7; 2	5.0; 0	1.7; 0	8.2; 3	2.5; 0	–	1.7
SyM Consulting/EPDA	21–23 Oct 2018	716	?	20.1; 8	15.9; 7	11.7; 5	22.6; 9	10.9; 4	3.6; 0	3.4; 0	4.2; 0	3.4; 0	–	2.5
Sonmerca/City Council	11 Apr–4 May 2018	2,307	?	17.0; 6	23.0; 9	20.1; 7	17.2; 6	14.1; 5	4.6; 0	–	–	–	–	2.9
Sigma Dos/Las Provincias	24–26 Apr 2018	500	?	21.2; 7/8	24.6; 9	22.7; 8/9	16.8; 6	7.5; 2	–	–	–	–	–	1.9
SyM Consulting/Valencia Plaza	8–11 Feb 2018	560	66.9	23.7; 8/9	24.4; 9	21.7; 8	15.4; 5/6	7.3; 2	3.7; 0	–	–	–	–	0.7
Sigma Dos/Las Provincias	3–5 May 2017	500	?	30.3; 10/11	24.8; 9	11.7; 4	18.6; 6/7	8.8; 3	–	–	–	–	–	5.5
2016 general election	26 Jun 2016	—N/a	76.5	36.1 (13)	(Note: Within Podemos–Compromís–EUPV.)	15.4 (5)	17.4 (6)			1.4 (0)	0.3 (0)	0.5 (0)	27.1 (9)	9.0
2015 general election	20 Dec 2015	—N/a	78.7	32.2 (12)	(Note: Within Podemos–Compromís.)	16.5 (6)	15.5 (5)		4.7 (0)	1.1 (0)	0.4 (0)	0.5 (0)	26.8 (10)	5.4
2015 municipal election	24 May 2015	—N/a	72.1	25.8; 10	23.3; 9	15.4; 6	14.0; 5	9.8; 3	4.7; 0	1.1; 0	0.8; 0	0.7; 0	–	2.6

=== Voting preferences ===
The table below lists raw, unweighted voting preferences.

Polling firm/Commissioner	Fieldwork date	Sample size	PP	Compromís	Cs	PSPV	VALC	EUPV	Vox	Unides Podem–EUPV	Question	X mark	Lead
2019 municipal election	26 May 2019	—N/a	14.4	18.1	11.6	12.8			4.8	2.8	—N/a	33.7	3.7
Invest Group/Prensa Ibérica	2–9 May 2019	700	11.7	18.4	11.3	19.9			4.3	6.8	21.3	–	1.5
April 2019 general election (Note: Does not include non-resident citizens.)	28 Apr 2019	—N/a	14.4	6.0	14.6	19.5			9.4	11.3	—N/a	21.8	4.9
CIS	21 Mar–23 Apr 2019	479	11.1	24.0	8.8	13.6			3.3	5.0	28.6	3.3	10.4
Sonmerca/City Council	11 Apr–4 May 2018	2,307	8.9	12.0	10.5	9.0	7.4	2.4	–	–	34.9	10.8	1.5
Sonmerca/City Council	22 Feb–8 Mar 2017	2,211	15.6	15.7	5.3	9.0	10.6	1.8	–	–	29.3	9.0	0.1
2016 general election	26 Jun 2016	—N/a	27.5		11.7	13.3			0.3	20.6	—N/a	23.5	6.9
2015 general election	20 Dec 2015	—N/a	25.2		12.9	12.1		3.7	0.3	21.0	—N/a	21.3	4.2
2015 municipal election	24 May 2015	—N/a	18.4	16.7	11.0	10.0	7.0	3.4	0.6	–	—N/a	27.9	1.7

=== Victory likelihood ===
The table below lists opinion polling on the perceived likelihood of victory for each party in the event of a municipal election taking place.

Polling firm/Commissioner	Fieldwork date	Sample size	PP	Compromís	PSPV	Other/ None	Question	Lead
Invest Group/Prensa Ibérica	2–9 May 2019	700	7.1	22.0	44.6	26.3		22.6

=== Preferred Mayor ===
The table below lists opinion polling on leader preferences to become mayor of Valencia.

Polling firm/Commissioner	Fieldwork date	Sample size						Other/ None/ Not care	Question	Lead
Polling firm/Commissioner	Fieldwork date	Sample size	Catalá PP	Ribó Compromís	Giner Cs	Gómez PSPV	Oliver UP	Other/ None/ Not care	Question	Lead
IMOP/El Confidencial	13–16 May 2019	800	15.1	34.7	–	10.3	–	39.9		19.6
GfK/Compromís	17–20 Dec 2018	908	19.3	30.9	15.1	12.3	5.2	18.3	–	11.6

== Results ==
← Summary of the 26 May 2019 City Council of Valencia election results →
Parties and alliances	Popular vote			Seats	
Parties and alliances	Votes	%	±pp	Total	+/−
Commitment to Valencia: Municipal Commitment (Compromís Municipal)	106,430	27.44	+4.14	10	+1
People's Party (PP)	84,491	21.78	−3.99	8	−2
Socialist Party of the Valencian Country (PSPV–PSOE)	74,848	19.30	+5.30	7	+2
Citizens–Party of the Citizenry (Cs)	68,293	17.61	+2.20	6	±0
Vox (Vox)	28,139	7.25	+6.45	2	+2
United We Can–United Left (Podem–EUPV)^{1}	16,176	4.17	−10.36	0	−3
Animalist Party Against Mistreatment of Animals (PACMA)	3,209	0.83	−0.25	0	±0
We Are Valencian in Movement (UiG–Som–CUIDES)	1,398	0.36	−0.35	0	±0
Forward–The Eco-pacifist Greens (Avant)	687	0.18	+0.05	0	±0
With You, We Are Democracy (Contigo)	513	0.13	New	0	±0
Democratic People (Poble)	355	0.09	−0.60	0	±0
Communist Party of the Peoples of Spain (PCPE)	276	0.07	−0.04	0	±0
Republican Left of the Valencian Country–Municipal Agreement (ERPV–AM)	270	0.07	New	0	±0
For a Fairer World (PUM+J)	184	0.05	New	0	±0
At Once Valencian Community (aUna CV)	164	0.04	New	0	±0
Acting With You–Party for the Society (ACPS)	157	0.04	New	0	±0
Blank Seats (EB)	135	0.03	−0.16	0	±0
Spanish Phalanx of the CNSO (FE de las JONS)	126	0.03	New	0	±0
Valencian Democrats (DV)	118	0.03	New	0	±0
Libertarian Party (P–LIB)	115	0.03	−0.02	0	±0
Centered Progressives Coalition (UPyD–CCD)^{2}	110	0.03	−1.35	0	±0
Let's Go (VMS)	90	0.02	New	0	±0
Republican Alternative (ALTER)	63	0.02	New	0	±0
Blank ballots	1,526	0.39	−0.71		
Total	387,873			33	±0
Valid votes	387,873	99.70	+0.52		
Invalid votes	1,184	0.30	−0.52		
Votes cast / turnout	389,057	66.32	−5.80		
Abstentions	197,567	33.68	+5.80		
Registered voters	586,624				
Sources
Footnotes: ^{1} United We Can–United Left results are compared to the combined totals of Valencia in Common and Citizen Agreement in the 2015 election.; ^{2} Centered Progressives Coalition results are compared to Union, Progress and Democracy totals in the 2015 election.

Popular vote
Compromís	27.44%
PP	21.78%
PSPV–PSOE	19.30%
Cs	17.61%
Vox	7.25%
Podem–EUPV	4.17%
Others	2.05%
Blank ballots	0.39%

Seats
Compromís	30.30%
PP	24.24%
PSPV–PSOE	21.21%
Cs	18.18%
Vox	6.06%

== Aftermath ==
=== Government formation ===
Investiture
Ballot →	15 June 2019	
Required majority →	17 out of 33	
Joan Ribó (Compromís): • Compromís (10); • PSPV (7)	17 / 33	check
María José Catalá (PP): • PP (8)	8 / 33	X mark
Fernando Giner (Cs): • Cs (6)	6 / 33	X mark
José Gosálbez (Vox): • Vox (2)	2 / 33	X mark
Abstentions/Blank ballots	0 / 33	
Absentees	0 / 33	

== Bibliography ==
- Constitución Española (Constitution). Official State Gazette (in Spanish). 27 December 1978 [version as of 27 September 2011]. BOE-A-1978-31229.
- Ley 7/1985, de 2 de abril, Reguladora de las Bases del Régimen Local (Law 7/1985). Official State Gazette (in Spanish). 2 April 1985 [version as of 4 August 2018]. BOE-A-1985-5392.
- Ley Orgánica 5/1985, de 19 de junio, del Régimen Electoral General (Organic Law 5/1985). Official State Gazette (in Spanish). 19 June 1985 [version as of 6 March 2019]. BOE-A-1985-11672.
- Real Decreto 209/2019, de 1 de abril, por el que se convocan elecciones locales y a las Asambleas de Ceuta y Melilla para el 26 de mayo de 2019 (Royal Decree 209/2019). Official State Gazette (in Spanish). 1 April 2019. BOE-A-2019-4824.
