= Joan Calabuig =

Spanish politician

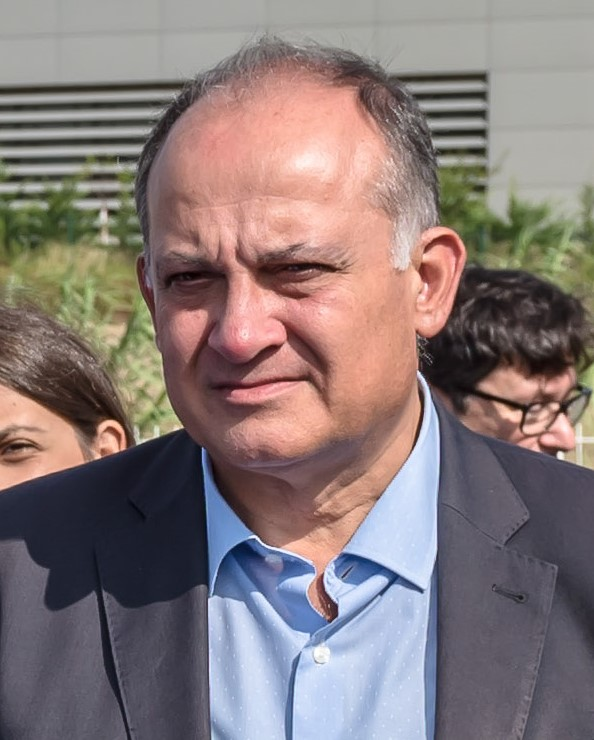
Joan Calabuig.

Joan Calabuig Rull (born 24 May 1960, Valencia) is a Spanish politician for the Spanish Socialist Workers' Party. Calabuig began his political career as a deputy in the local parliament, the Corts Valencianes in 1983 serving until 1987. He also served as President of the Union of Young Socialists from 1985–89. In 2004 he was elected as a Member of the European Parliament but stepped down in 2008 when elected to the Spanish national parliament as a deputy for Valencia province. He was the PSOE's mayoral challenger vis-à-vis the 2015 Valencia municipal election.
