= Joan Ribó =

Spanish politician and engineer

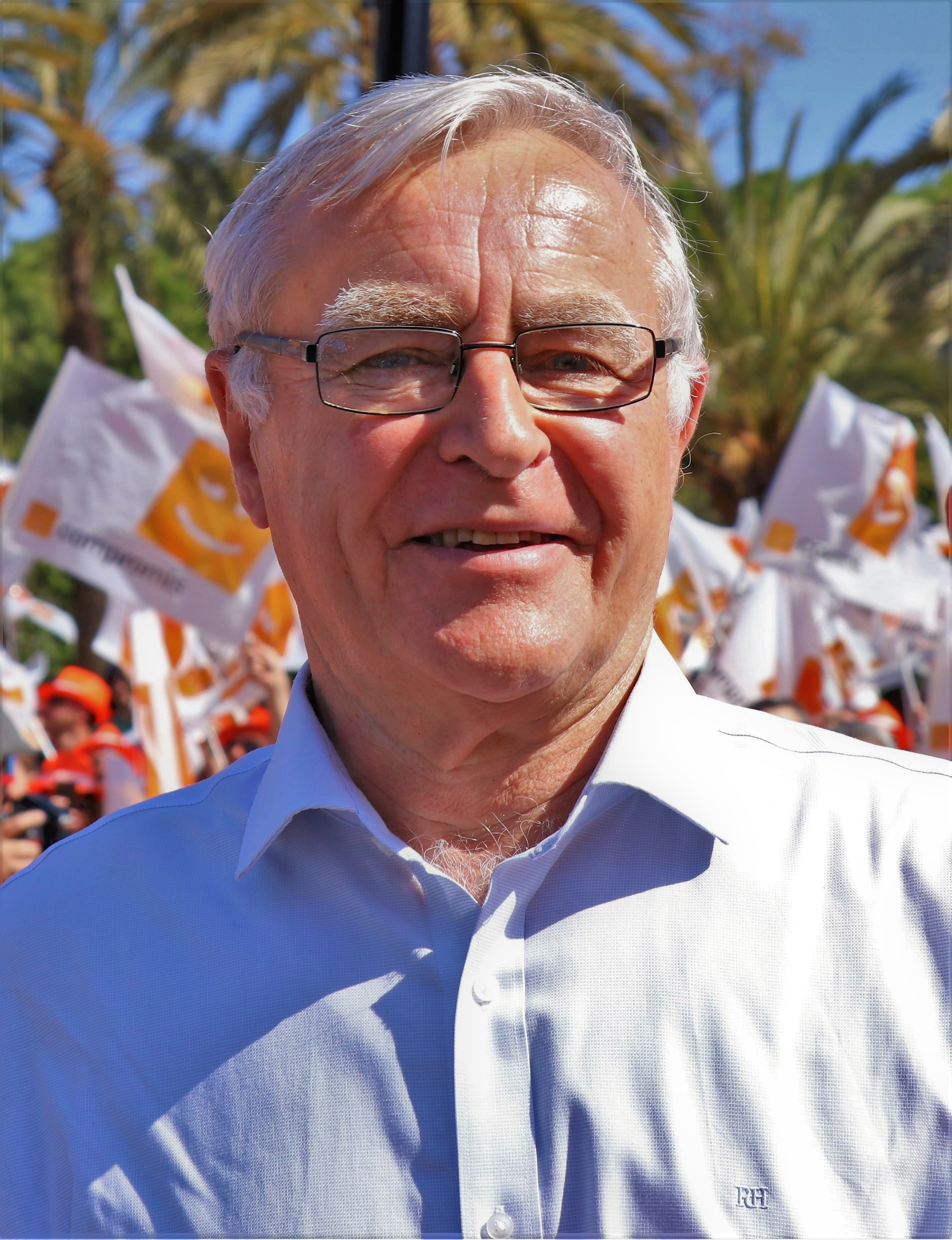
- Ribó in 2019

Mayor of Valencia
- In office 13 June 2015 – 17 June 2023
- Preceded by: Rita Barberá
- Succeeded by: María José Catalá

Member of the Corts Valencianes
- In office 26 May 1995 – 27 May 2007
- Constituency: Valencia

Personal details
- Born: 17 September 1947 (age 79) Manresa, Catalonia, Spain
- Party: Compromís (since 2011)
- Other political affiliations: United Left (until 2007)
- Education: Polytechnic University of Valencia

Joan Ribó Canut (Valencian: [dʒuˈan riˈboj kaˈnut]; born 17 September 1947) is a Spanish politician and engineer who was the mayor of Valencia from 2015 to 2023. Ribó is a member of Coalició Compromís.

== Career ==
Ribó was born on 17 September 1947 in Manresa in the Province of Barcelona. He studied agricultural engineering at the Polytechnic University of Valencia. Ribó later worked as a school teacher and university professor.

Ribó became active in Valencian politics in the 1980s. He was a member of the Corts Valencianes for the United Left between 1995 and 2007. In 2007 he left the party and in 2011 he became politically active again when he joined Coalició Compromís.

After the Valencian council elections of May 2015 he became mayor of Valencia on 13 June 2015, succeeding Rita Barberá of the People's Party in a historic council election.

After the 2019 local elections that took place on 26 May, Ribó won the elections and was elected mayor of Valencia again. It was the first time that Compromís came first in the local elections in the city.

== Personal life ==
In his spare time, Ribó is an avid gardener and cyclist.
