= María José Catalá =

Mayor of Valencia

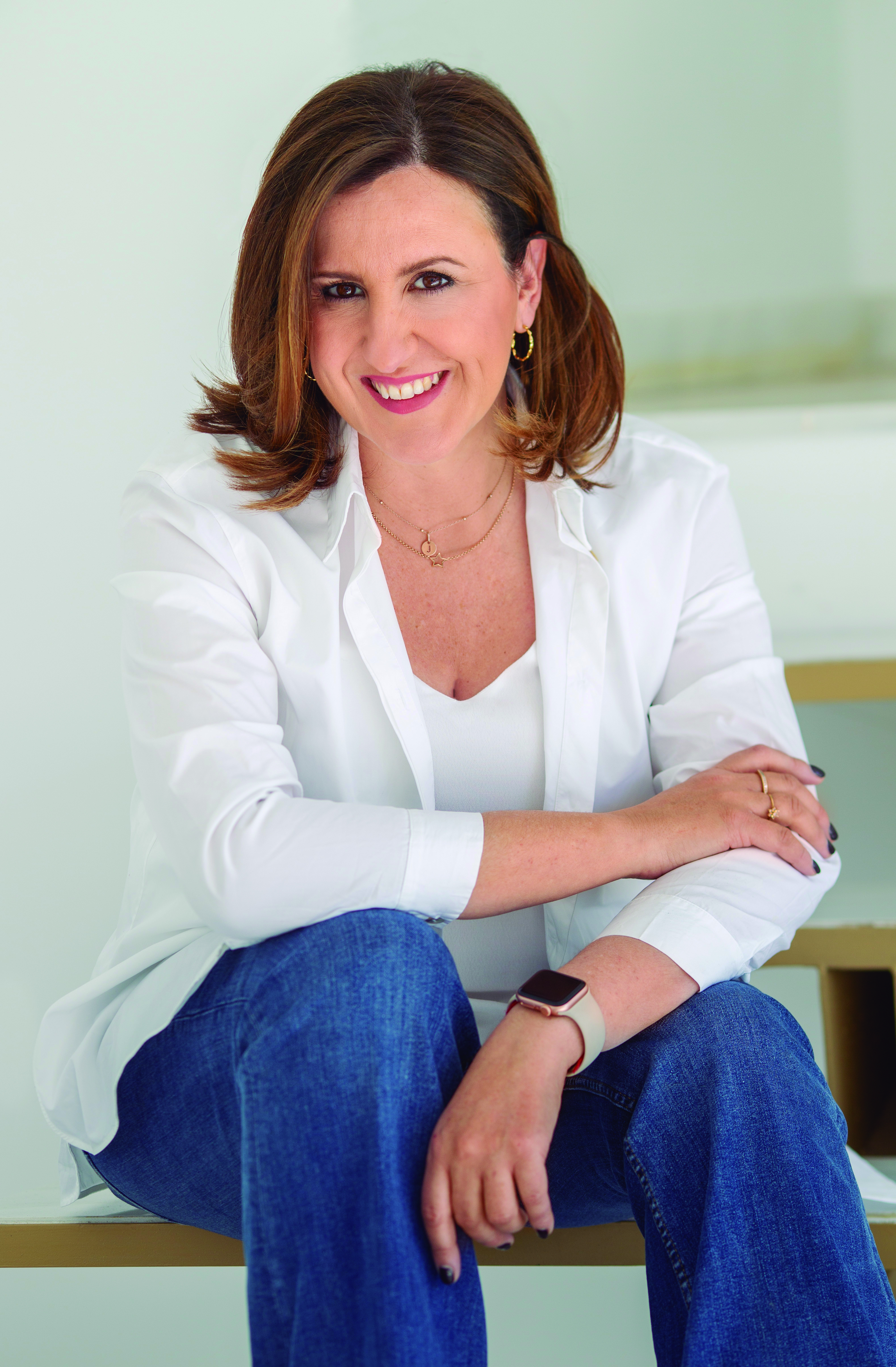
- Catalá in 2023

Mayor of Valencia
- Incumbent
- Assumed office 17 June 2023
- Preceded by: Joan Ribó

Minister of Education, Culture and Sports of the Valencian Government
- In office 7 December 2012 – 30 June 2015
- President: Alberto Fabra
- Preceded by: herself as Minister of Education, Training and Employment
- Succeeded by: Vicent Marzà

Member of the Congress of Deputies
- In office 31 March 2008 – 6 October 2008
- Constituency: Valencia

Member of the Corts Valencianes
- Incumbent
- Assumed office 10 June 2011
- Constituency: Valencia

Personal details
- Born: 2 March 1981 (age 45) Valencia, Valencian Community, Spain
- Party: PPCV
- Education: CEU Cardinal Herrera University

María José Catalá Verdet (born 3 March 1981) is a Spanish politician who belongs to the People's Party (PP). Since June 2023 she has been the Mayor of Valencia.

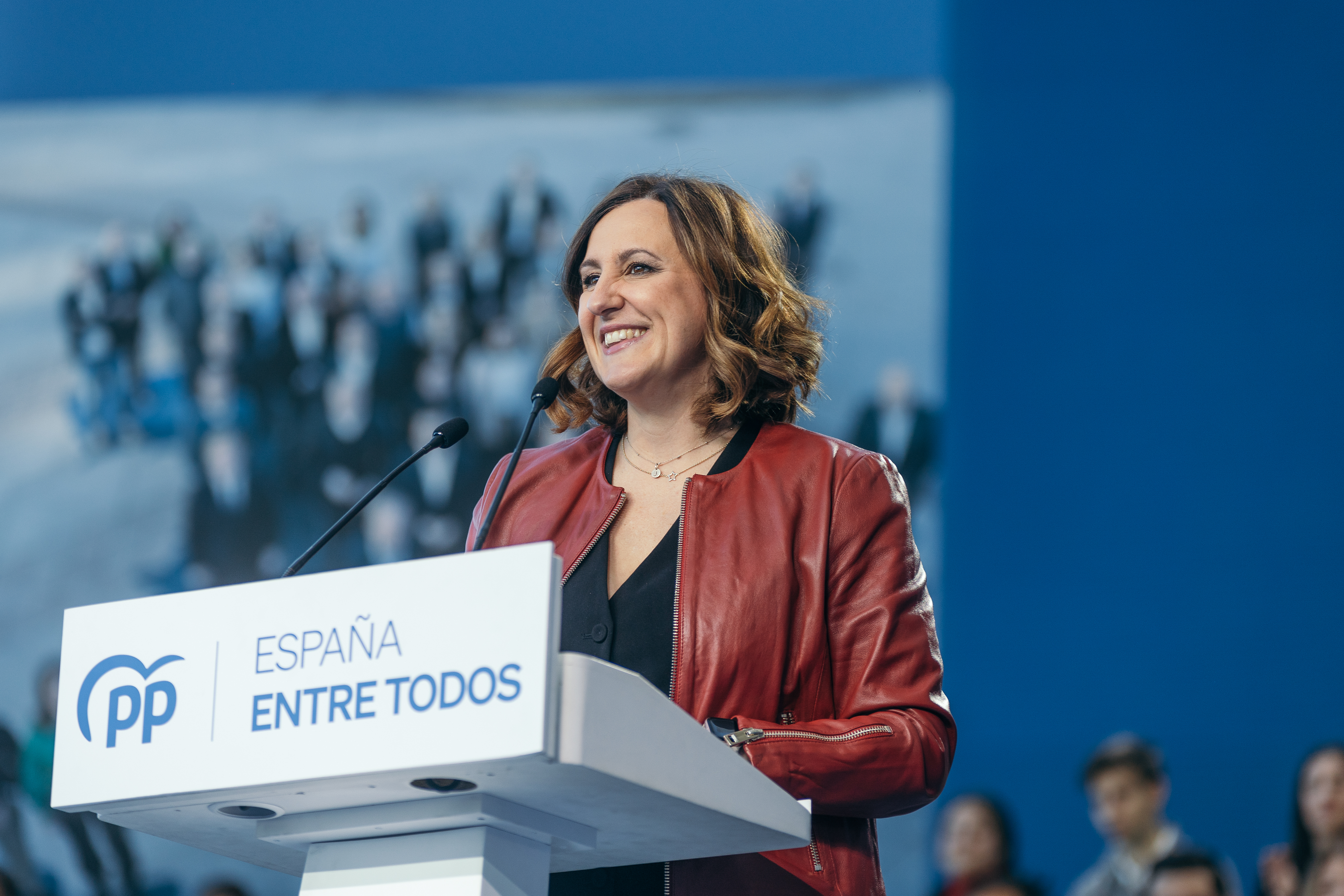
María José Catalá in the Intermunicipal in 2023

She was the mayor of Torrent (2007–2012), the first woman and first from her party to hold the office, and briefly served in the Congress of Deputies in 2008. She was Minister of Education in the Generalitat Valenciana from 2012 to 2015, and was elected to the Corts Valencianes in 2015 and Valencia City Council in 2019.

== Biography ==
Born in Valencia, Catalá holds a degree in law from the CEU Cardinal Herrera University, and a master's degree in Business Administration. In March 2017, she received a doctorate from CEU Cardinal Herrera University. Her thesis was on the relations between voters and representatives in the early 21st century, a time of corruption scandals, including several involving her party.

Catalá entered politics in 2003 when she was elected as a PP councillor for the town of Torrent to the south-west of the city of Valencia. In 2007, she was chosen as the PP candidate for mayor of Torrent and was elected in May, becoming the first female mayor of the city. She was also its first PP mayor, ending 28 years of Spanish Socialist Workers' Party (PSOE) control, as well as being one of the youngest mayors at the time, aged 26.

In 2008, Catalá was elected to the Congress of Deputies representing the Valencia constituency after being awarded the fourth place on the PP list, virtually guaranteeing her election, as the party had won at least five seats in every election from 1982 onwards. However, she only served a half year in Congress, resigning in October 2008 and was replaced by Teresa García Sena.

Catalá left her post as mayor in 2012, being named Minister of Education in Alberto Fabra's Generalitat Valenciana and serving as its spokesperson for the final year before the 2015 election, in which she was elected to the Corts Valencianes. In January 2019, she was named the PP candidate for mayor of Valencia ahead of the election in May. The PP came second, and incumbent mayor Joan Ribó of Coalició Compromís was re-elected with the support of the PSOE. In June 2023, she won the local elections, becoming Mayor of Valencia.
