= Manuel Giner Miralles =

Spanish politician (1926–2019)

Manuel Giner Miralles (Valencia, Spain, 27 December 1926 – Valencia, Spain, 9 May 2019) was a Spanish doctor, entrepreneur, and politician.

== Early elections ==
Giner was one of the founder members of the People's Alliance (AP) in the Valencian Community and was a member of the party's Provincial Executive Committee. As an AP member, he was elected to the national parliament as a deputy for Valencia province at the 1982 General Election. However, he resigned after one year in order to stand for election for Valencia Province to the Corts Valencianes, the reconstituted Valencian regional parliament in 1983. He was the lead AP candidate and, therefore, candidate for President of the Valencian Community but lost to the Spanish Socialist Workers' Party (PSOE) candidate Joan Lerma. In January 1986, following internal disagreements, he threatened to resign from the AP but remained in the party after the intervention of the AP leader Manuel Fraga. He coordinated the AP campaign for the June 1987 regional election and was re-elected as a regional deputy.

== Expulsion from the Popular Alliance ==
The AP defeat in that election caused an internal crisis which had initially stemmed from disagreements over those nominated to contest the election for the party Giner argued that some in the AP had not been satisfied with replacing him as regional head of the AP but had also wanted to remove him completely from the candidate list. Eventually he had been included on the list as the third candidate. He criticised the organisation of the AP in the Valencia region and particularly the regional AP president Ignacio Gil Lázaro. Giner publicly implied that defecting to the Valencian Union (UV), a right wing regional party that had grown in strength in this period, was a possibility. When Gil Lázaro asked him to clarify his position, he responded by asking for a period of reflection. This led to his expulsion from AP, an action that he denounced as "illegal" and "against the statutes of the AP." He subsequently joined UV in September 1987 and although he did not contest the 1991 election, he returned to the Corts Valencianes at the 1995 election as a UV deputy, serving until 1999.

In 1967, before his career in politics, he was one of the founders of Grupo Hospitales Nisa, one of the leading companies in the Spanish private health sector. In 1972 he became Nisa's Chief Executive Officer until 1997. In 1998 Giner was named chief of the "John Paul II, Family and Life Foundation." He was also CEO of Edifesa, a construction company, until his retirement in 2006 at age 80.

In January 2009, he was one of several former members of the Corts Valencianes who criticised the pension scheme for former members of the legislature as being inadequate.
