= Valencian Regional Union =

Valencian Regional Union Unió Regional Valenciana
- Leader: Ignacio Carrau; Miguel Ramón Izquierdo
- Founded: 1977
- Dissolved: 1979
- Succeeded by: Valencian Nationalist Left (Left-wing faction); Valencian Union (Right-wing faction)
- Headquarters: Valencia
- Ideology: Valencianism; Blaverism; Anti-Catalanism
- Political position: Big tent

Valencian Regional Union (Catalan: Unió Regional Valenciana, URV) was a Valencianist and anti-Catalanist political party founded in the Valencian Community in 1977.

== History ==
The party was founded by the ex-mayor of València Miguel Ramón Izquierdo and by the president of the deputation of the Province of València Ignacio Carrau.

Its main objective was the defense of the "Valencian personality" and the Valencian symbols, such as the Real Senyera and the denomination of the Kingdom of Valencia, opposing the adoption of symbols that they considered "Catalan" (plain senyera and the name "Valencian Country"). URV also defended that the Valencian Community should achieve autonomy through the Article 143 of the Spanish Constitution of 1978 (like Catalonia, Galiza and the Basque Country), and not by Article 151.

URV had a strong influence in the city of València itself, but was very weak in the rest of the Valencian Community. In the local elections of 1979 URV gained one city councillor in València and played a key role in the so-called "Battle of Valencia". In October 1979 the left-wing faction of the party decided to refound it as Valencian Nationalist Left, after decision the right-wing faction (led by Miguel Ramón Izquierdo, Vicente González Lizondo and Vicente Ramos Pérez) left the organization and founded Valencian Union.

== See also ==
- Blaverism
- Valencian Union
- Valencian Nationalist Left
