= 1999 Valencian regional election =

Election in the Spanish region of the Valencian Community

- 13 June 1999

All 89 seats in the Corts Valencianes 45 seats needed for a majority
- Opinion polls
- Registered: 3,361,989 ▲7.4%
- Turnout: 2,279,805 (67.8%) ▼8.2 pp
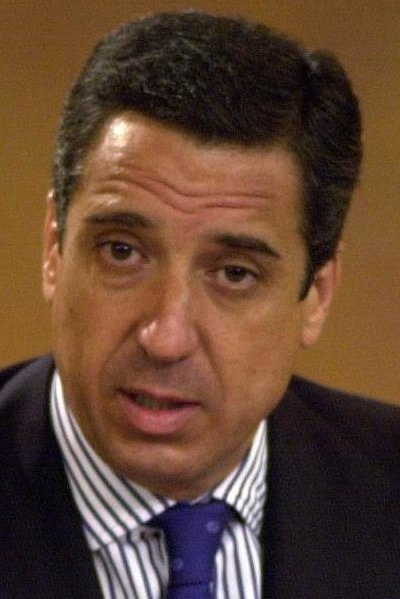

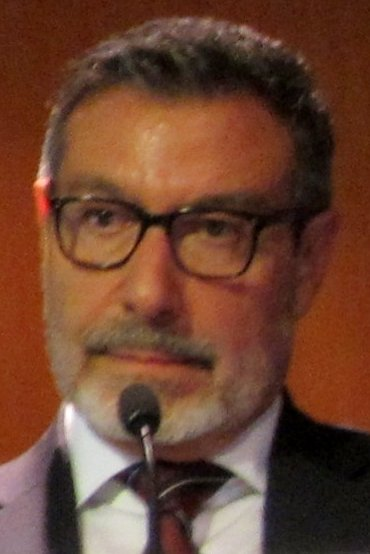

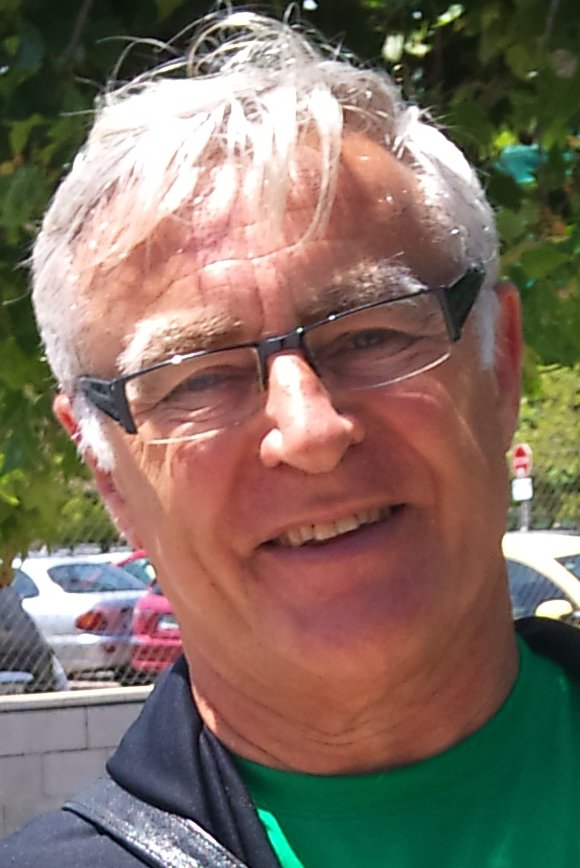
	First party	Second party	Third party
Leader	Eduardo Zaplana	Antoni Asunción	Joan Ribó
Party	PP	PSOE–p	EUPV
Leader since	26 September 1993	7 April 1999	1997
Leader's seat	Valencia	Valencia	Valencia
Last election	42 seats, 42.8%	32 seats, 34.0%	10 seats, 11.5%
Seats won	49	35	5
Seat change	▲7	▲3	▼5
Popular vote	1,085,011	768,548	137,212
Percentage	47.9%	33.9%	6.1%
Swing	▲5.1 pp	▼0.1 pp	▼5.4 pp
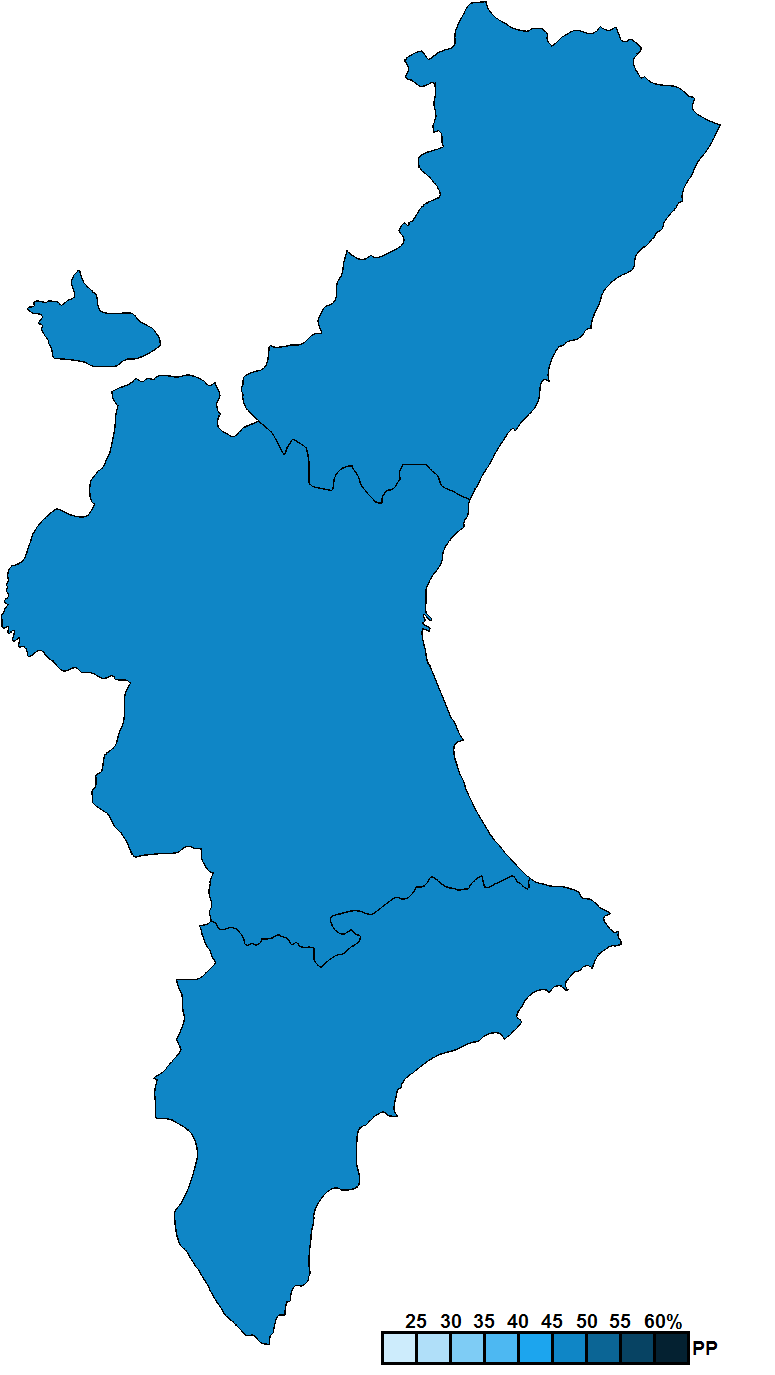
President before election
Eduardo Zaplana
PP
President after election
Eduardo Zaplana
PP

A regional election was held in the Valencian Community on 13 June 1999 to elect the 5th Corts of the autonomous community. All 89 seats in the Corts were up for election. It was held concurrently with regional elections in twelve other autonomous communities and local elections all across Spain, as well as the 1999 European Parliament election.

The People's Party (PP), which had ruled the community from 1995 in a coalition government, won an absolute majority of seats; a majority which it would maintain for the next 20 years. Its coalition partner, the Valencian Union (UV), fell just below the 5% threshold, resulting in it losing all seats and being expelled from the Corts. The Spanish Socialist Workers' Party (PSOE) remained static on its 1995 vote share, though it gained 3 additional seats thanks to United Left (IU) electoral collapse from 10 to 5 seats.

== Overview ==
Under the 1982 Statute of Autonomy, the Corts Valencianes were the unicameral legislature of the Valencian Community, having legislative power in devolved matters, as well as the ability to grant or withdraw confidence from a regional president. The electoral and procedural rules were supplemented by national law provisions.

=== Date ===
The term of the Corts Valencianes expired four years after the date of their previous election, with election day being fixed for the fourth Sunday of May every four years, but a 1998 amendment allowed for regional elections held in May 1995 to be held concurrently with European Parliament elections, provided that they were scheduled for within a four month-timespan. The election decree was required to be issued no later than 54 days before the scheduled election date and published on the following day in the Official Journal of the Valencian Government (DOGV). The previous election was held on 28 May 1995, setting the date for election day concurrently with that year's European Parliament election on 13 June 1999.

The Corts Valencianes could not be dissolved before the expiration date of parliament.

The Corts Valencianes were officially dissolved on 20 April 1999 with the publication of the corresponding decree in the DOGV, setting election day for 13 June and scheduling for the chamber to reconvene on 9 July.

=== Electoral system ===
Voting for the Corts was based on universal suffrage, comprising all Spanish nationals over 18 years of age, registered in the Valencian Community and with full political rights, provided that they had not been deprived of the right to vote by a final sentence, nor were legally incapacitated.

The Corts Valencianes had a minimum of 75 and a maximum of 100 seats, with the electoral law fixing its size at 89. All were elected in three multi-member constituencies—corresponding to the provinces of Alicante, Castellón and Valencia, each of which was assigned an initial minimum of 20 seats and the remaining 29 distributed in proportion to population (with the seat-to-population ratio in any given province not exceeding three times that of any other)—using the D'Hondt method and closed-list proportional voting, with a five percent-threshold of valid votes (including blank ballots) regionally.

As a result of the aforementioned allocation, each Corts constituency was entitled the following seats:

Seats	Constituencies
37	Valencia
30	Alicante
22	Castellón

The law did not provide for by-elections to fill vacant seats; instead, any vacancies arising after the proclamation of candidates and during the legislative term were filled by the next candidates on the party lists or, when required, by designated substitutes.

=== Outgoing parliament ===
The table below shows the composition of the parliamentary groups in the chamber at the time of dissolution.

Parliamentary composition in April 1999
Groups	Parties	Legislators	
Groups	Parties	Seats	Total
People's Parliamentary Group	PP	42	42
Socialist Parliamentary Group	PSOE	30	30
United Left–The Greens Parliamentary Group	EUPV	7	7
Valencian Union Nationalist Parliamentary Group	UV	4	4
Mixed Group	PDNI	3 (Note: Francesc Colomer, Albert Taberner and Pedro Zamora, former EUPV legislators.)	5
Mixed Group	IPCV	1 (Note: Rafael Ferraro, former UV legislator.)	5
Mixed Group	INDEP	2 (Note: Roberto García Blanes and Josep Garés, former PSOE legislators.)	5

== Parties and candidates ==
The electoral law allowed for parties and federations registered in the interior ministry, alliances and groupings of electors to present lists of candidates. Parties and federations intending to form an alliance were required to inform the relevant electoral commission within 10 days of the election call, whereas groupings of electors needed to secure the signature of at least one percent of the electorate in the constituencies for which they sought election, disallowing electors from signing for more than one list.

Below is a list of the main parties and alliances which contested the election:

Candidacy	Parties and alliances	Leading candidate	Ideology	Previous result		Gov.	Ref.
Candidacy	Parties and alliances	Leading candidate	Ideology	Vote %	Seats	Gov.	Ref.
PP	List: People's Party (PP)	Eduardo Zaplana	Conservatism; Christian democracy	42.8%	42	Yes	
PSOE–p	List: Spanish Socialist Workers' Party (PSOE); Democratic Party of the New Left (PDNI)	Antoni Asunción	Social democracy	34.0%	32	No	
EUPV	List: United Left of the Valencian Country (EUPV) – Communist Party of the Valencian Country (PCPV) – Socialist Action Party (PASOC) – Republican Left (IR) – Revolutionary Workers' Party (POR) – Workers' Revolutionary Party (PRT)	Joan Ribó	Socialism; Communism	11.5%	10	No	
UV	List: Valencian Union (UV)	Héctor Villalba	Blaverism; Conservatism	7.0%	5	No	
BNV–EV	List: Valencian Nationalist Bloc (BNV); The Greens (EV/LV)	Pere Mayor	Valencian nationalism Eco-socialism; Green politics	2.7% (Note: Results for UPV–BN in the 1995 election.)	0	No	

== Opinion polls ==
The tables below list opinion polling results in reverse chronological order, showing the most recent first and using the dates when the survey fieldwork was done, as opposed to the date of publication. Where the fieldwork dates are unknown, the date of publication is given instead. The highest percentage figure in each polling survey is displayed with its background shaded in the leading party's colour. If a tie ensues, this is applied to the figures with the highest percentages. The "Lead" column on the right shows the percentage-point difference between the parties with the highest percentages in a poll.

=== Voting intention estimates ===
The table below lists weighted voting intention estimates. Refusals are generally excluded from the party vote percentages, while question wording and the treatment of "don't know" responses and those not intending to vote may vary between polling organisations. When available, seat projections determined by the polling organisations are displayed below (or in place of) the percentages in a smaller font; 45 seats were required for an absolute majority in the Corts Valencianes.

Polling firm/Commissioner	Fieldwork date	Sample size	Turnout	PP	PSPV	EUPV	UV	Bloc–EV	Lead
1999 regional election	13 Jun 1999	—N/a	67.8	47.9; 49	33.9; 35	6.1; 5	4.7; 0	4.5; 0	14.0
Eco Consulting/ABC	24 May–2 Jun 1999	?	?	42.5; 43/45	30.3; 30/31	12.5; 10/11	7.0; 5	–	12.2
Demoscopia/El País	26 May–1 Jun 1999	?	69	49.0; 48/50	32.0; 31/33	9.9; 5/7	5.2; 0/4	3.6; 0	17.0
Sigma Dos/El Mundo	20–26 May 1999	1,200	?	48.7; 47/50	33.2; 31/34	8.5; 7	4.9; 0/2	–	15.5
CIS	3–20 May 1999	2,100	75.1	48.1; 46/49	31.9; 31/33	9.5; 7/8	5.1; 0/4	3.2; 0	16.2
Tele 5	4 May 1999	?	?	49.0; 46/48	34.0; 32/34	7.0; 5	3.0; 0	5.0; 2/4	15.0
Demoscopia/El País	9 Oct 1998	?	74	45.0	34.5	8.0	6.7	–	10.5
1996 general election	3 Mar 1996	—N/a	81.7	43.7 (42)	38.3 (38)	11.1 (9)	3.5 (0)	1.0 (0)	5.4
1995 regional election	28 May 1995	—N/a	76.0	42.8; 42	34.0; 32	11.5; 10	7.0; 5	2.7; 0	8.8

=== Voting preferences ===
The table below lists raw, unweighted voting preferences.

Polling firm/Commissioner	Fieldwork date	Sample size	PP	PSPV	EUPV	UV	Bloc–EV	Question	X mark	Lead
1999 regional election (Note: Does not include non-resident citizens.)	13 Jun 1999	—N/a	32.1	22.7	4.1	3.1	3.0	—N/a	32.0	9.4
CIS	3–20 May 1999	2,100	39.0	21.2	5.5	2.6	1.5	21.9	5.3	17.8
1996 general election	3 Mar 1996	—N/a	36.4	31.8	9.2	2.9	0.9	—N/a	18.2	4.6
1995 regional election	28 May 1995	—N/a	32.7	25.8	8.8	5.3	2.1	—N/a	23.4	6.9

=== Victory preferences ===
The table below lists opinion polling on the victory preferences for each party in the event of a regional election taking place.

Polling firm/Commissioner	Fieldwork date	Sample size	PP	PSPV	EUPV	UV	Bloc–EV	Other/ None	Question	Lead
CIS	3–20 May 1999	2,100	43.7	26.3	6.3	2.7	1.4	1.2	18.4	17.4

=== Victory likelihood ===
The table below lists opinion polling on the perceived likelihood of victory for each party in the event of a regional election taking place.

Polling firm/Commissioner	Fieldwork date	Sample size	PP	PSPV	EUPV	UV	Bloc–EV	Other/ None	Question	Lead
CIS	3–20 May 1999	2,100	74.1	5.7	0.2	0.3	0.1	0.1	19.5	68.4
Demoscopia/El País	9 Oct 1998	?	67.0	18.0	–	–	–	15.0		49.0

=== Preferred President ===
The table below lists opinion polling on leader preferences to become president of the Valencian Government.

Polling firm/Commissioner	Fieldwork date	Sample size							Other/ None/ Not care	Question	Lead
Polling firm/Commissioner	Fieldwork date	Sample size	Zaplana PP	Romero PSOE	Asunción PSOE	Ribó EUPV	Villalba UV	Mayor BNV	Other/ None/ Not care	Question	Lead
CIS	3–20 May 1999	2,100	48.9	–	15.5	1.1	1.7	1.4	3.9	27.5	33.4
Demoscopia/El País	9 Oct 1998	?	44.0	21.9	–	–	–	–	34.1		22.1

== Results ==
=== Overall ===
← Summary of the 13 June 1999 Corts Valencianes election results →
Parties and alliances	Popular vote			Seats	
Parties and alliances	Votes	%	±pp	Total	+/−
People's Party (PP)	1,085,011	47.88	+5.05	49	+7
Spanish Socialist Workers' Party–Progressives (PSOE–p)	768,548	33.91	−0.07	35	+3
United Left of the Valencian Country (EUPV)	137,212	6.05	−5.48	5	−5
Valencian Union (UV)	106,119	4.68	−2.33	0	−5
Valencian Nationalist Bloc–The Greens (BNV–EV)^{1}	102,700	4.53	+1.82	0	±0
Valencian Community Alternative (ACV)	6,146	0.27	New	0	±0
Liberal Centre (CL)	4,813	0.21	New	0	±0
The Ecologist–Pacifist Greens (LVEP)	4,176	0.18	New	0	±0
Centrist Union–Democratic and Social Centre (UC–CDS)	2,978	0.13	−0.10	0	±0
Spanish Phalanx of the CNSO (FE–JONS)	2,973	0.13	+0.06	0	±0
Independent Initiative (II)	2,524	0.11	New	0	±0
Humanist Party (PH)	2,253	0.10	+0.07	0	±0
Valencian Nationalist Left (ENV)	2,070	0.09	+0.01	0	±0
Federal Republican Left–Federal Republican Party (IRF–PRF)	1,660	0.07	New	0	±0
Valencian Independent Organization (OIV)	1,316	0.06	New	0	±0
Spanish Autonomous League (LAE)	608	0.03	+0.01	0	±0
Blank ballots	35,168	1.55	+0.50		
Total	2,266,275			89	±0
Valid votes	2,266,275	99.41	−0.03		
Invalid votes	13,530	0.59	+0.03		
Votes cast / turnout	2,279,805	67.81	−8.22		
Abstentions	1,082,184	32.19	+8.22		
Registered voters	3,361,989				
Sources
Footnotes: ^{1} Valencian Nationalist Bloc–The Greens results are compared to Valencian People's Union–Nationalist Bloc totals in the 1995 election.

Popular vote
PP	47.88%
PSOE–p	33.91%
EUPV	6.05%
UV	4.68%
BNV–EV	4.53%
Others	1.39%
Blank ballots	1.55%

Seats
PP	55.06%
PSOE–p	39.33%
EUPV	5.62%

=== Distribution by constituency ===
Constituency	PP		PSOE–p		EUPV	
Constituency	%	S	%	S	%	S
Alicante	48.7	16	36.0	12	6.1	2
Castellón	49.3	12	34.6	9	4.2	1
Valencia	47.1	21	32.6	14	6.4	2
Total	47.9	49	33.9	35	6.1	5

== Aftermath ==
=== Government formation ===
Investiture
Candidate	Ballot →	16 July 1999	
Candidate	Required majority →	45 out of 89	
Eduardo Zaplana (PP)	Yes: • PP (49)	49 / 89	check
Eduardo Zaplana (PP)	No: • PSOE (35); • EUPV (5)	40 / 89	check
Eduardo Zaplana (PP)	Abstentions	0 / 89	check
Eduardo Zaplana (PP)	Absentees	0 / 89	check
Antoni Asunción (PSOE)	Cancelled		
Joan Ribó (EUPV)	Cancelled		

=== 2002 investiture ===
Investiture
Candidate	Ballot →	16 July 2002	
Candidate	Required majority →	45 out of 89	
José Luis Olivas (PP)	Yes: • PP (49)	49 / 89	check
José Luis Olivas (PP)	No: • PSOE (34); • EUPV (5); • EV–IPV (1)	40 / 89	check
José Luis Olivas (PP)	Abstentions	0 / 89	check
José Luis Olivas (PP)	Absentees	0 / 89	check
Joan Ribó (EUPV)	Cancelled		

== Bibliography ==
- Ley Orgánica 5/1982, de 1 de julio, de Estatuto de Autonomía de la Comunidad Valenciana (Organic Law 1/1982). Official State Gazette (in Spanish). 1 July 1982 [version as of 5 August 1997]. BOE-A-1982-17235.
- Ley 5/1983, de 30 de diciembre, de Gobierno Valenciano (Law 5/1983). Official State Gazette (in Spanish). 30 December 1983 [version as of 7 April 1995]. BOE-A-1984-3460.
- Ley Orgánica 5/1985, de 19 de junio, del Régimen Electoral General (Organic Law 5/1985). Official State Gazette (in Spanish). 19 June 1985 [version as of 22 April 1999]. BOE-A-1985-11672.
- Ley 1/1987, de 31 de marzo, Electoral Valenciana (Law 1/1987). Official State Gazette (in Spanish). 31 March 1987 [version as of 6 April 1987]. BOE-A-1987-9636.
- Decreto 8/1999, de 19 de abril, del presidente de la Generalitat Valenciana, de disolución y convocatoria de elecciones a las Cortes Valencianas (PDF) (Decree 8/1999). Official Journal of the Valencian Government (in Spanish). 19 April 1999.
