= Josep Pons Grau =

Spanish politician (1948–2024)

Member of the European Parliament for Spain
- In office 1 January 1986 – 19 July 1999

Member of the Congress of Deputies for Valencia
- In office 22 March 1983 – 23 April 1986
- Preceded by: Joan Romero González

Personal details
- Born: Josep Enric Pons Grau; 19 June 1948 Tavernes de la Valldigna, Spain
- Died: 12 June 2024 (aged 75)
- Party: PSPV–PSOE
- Education: University of Valencia
- Occupation: Academic

Josep Enric Pons Grau (19 June 1948 – 12 June 2024) was a Spanish politician. A member of the Socialist Party of the Valencian Country, he served in the Congress of Deputies from 1983 to 1986 and the European Parliament from 1986 to 1999.

Pons Grau died on 12 June 2024, at the age of 75.

== Early life and education ==
Pons Grau earned a degree (licenciatura) in Philosophy and Letters, specializing in History, from the University of Valencia, and worked as a secondary-school teacher. According to an encyclopedic biography, he began teaching at the Salesianos school in Valencia in 1974 and, during his student years, participated in the founding of the Democratic Students' Union at the University of Valencia.

== Political and cultural activity ==
He joined the Spanish Socialist Workers' Party (PSOE) during the 1970s, at a time when it operated clandestinely under the Franco dictatorship. In the Congress of Deputies, he served as a member (vocal) of the Defence Commission, the Foreign Affairs Commission, and the parliamentary oversight commission for Spanish public broadcasting (RTVE).

In the European Parliament, he was Vice-Chair of the Committee on External Economic Relations (1987–1989). From 1992 to 1999, he served as a Vice-Chair of the European Parliament delegation to the ACP–EEC/ACP–EU Joint Assembly and held related committee and delegation assignments during his third and fourth terms.

Outside parliamentary politics, a Valencian reference work on the festival history credits him as director of the first four editions of Mostra de València – Cinema del Mediterrani (1980–1983), describing the event as a municipal cultural initiative and noting that he stepped down from the festival’s leadership after becoming a member of parliament in 1983.
