= Joan Romero González =

Spanish politician (born 1953)

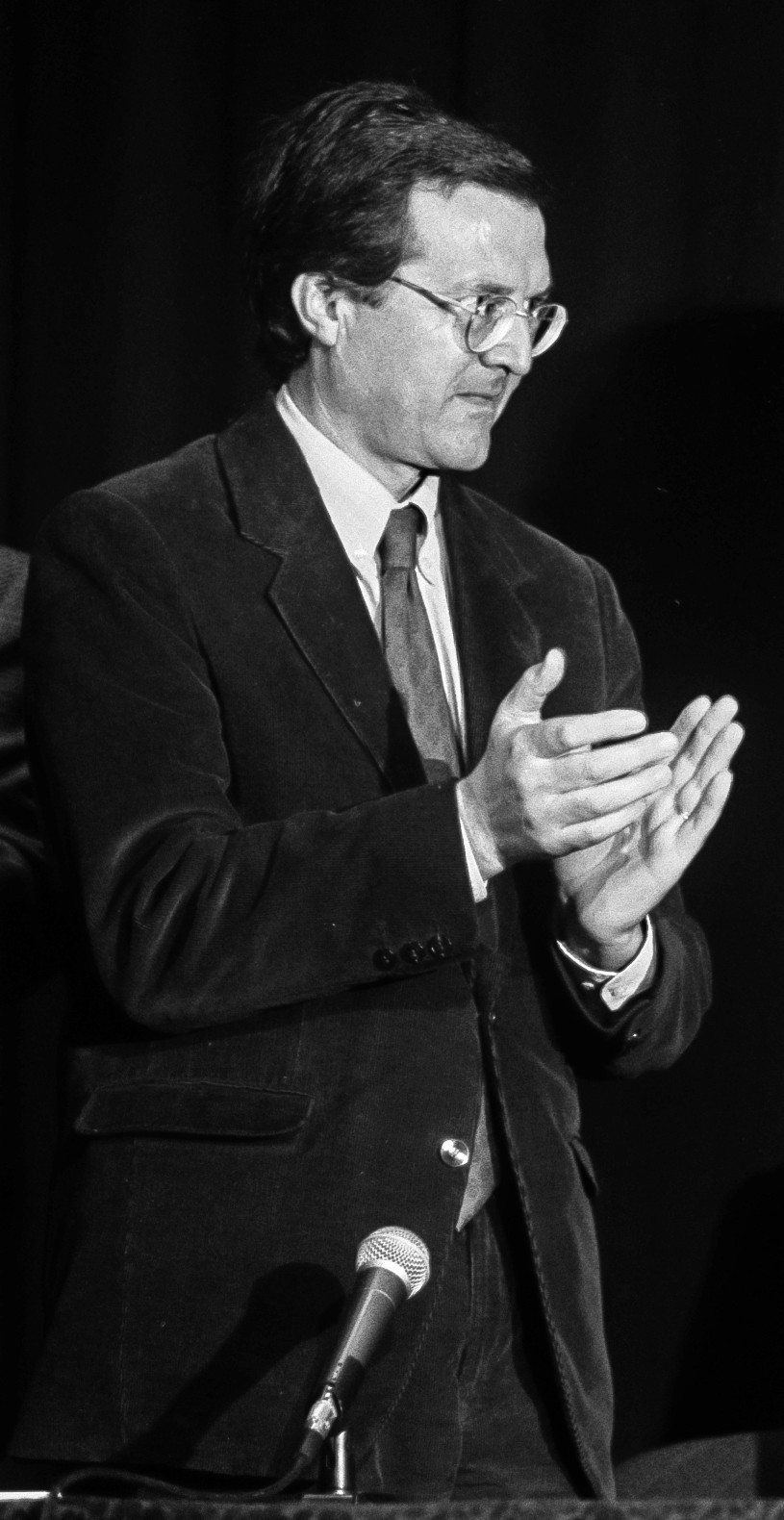

Joan Romero González (1953, Albacete, Spain) is a Spanish politician who belonged to the Spanish Socialist Workers' Party (PSOE).

Romero studied geography and history and later became professor of human geography at the University of Valencia. At the 1982 General Election he was elected to the Spanish Congress of Deputies representing Valencia Province but resigned from the Congress in January 1983. He was then named director general of universities in the Generalitat Valenciana, the Valencian regional administration and then became minister of education and science in the administration of Joan Lerma in July 1983, serving until 1995 when the PSOE lost the Valencian regional elections.

He returned to the Spanish Congress at the 1996 General Election but resigned his seat in 1999 in order to stand in the 1999 election to the Corts Valencianes, the Valencian regional parliament. Initially he was chosen to head the list; however, the list was not approved by the national directive of the PSOE and ultimately Romero was not a candidate. He had been elected secretary general of the PSOE in July 1997, but resigned from the party in April 2000.

In March 2026, the Mayor of Valencia, María José Catalá, appointed Joan Romero to lead the development of the framework for the Valencia Metropolitan Area Master Plan a task he undertook using an interdisciplinary approach involving academic collaboration with public institutions, and on which he presented progress updates to all political groups in the Valencia City Council.

== Published works ==
- Geografía Humana. Procesos riesgos e incertidumbres en un mundo globalizado (2004)
- Las Otras Geografías (2006)
- España inacabada (2006)
