= 1983 Valencia municipal election =

Election in the Spanish municipality of Valencia

- 8 May 1983

All 33 seats in the City Council of Valencia 17 seats needed for a majority
- Opinion polls
- Registered: 553,067 ▲0.2%
- Turnout: 386,699 (69.9%) ▲7.6 pp

| | First party | Second party | Third party |
|---|---|---|---|
| Leader | Ricard Pérez Casado | Martín Luis Quirós | Pedro Zamora |
| Party | PSOE | AP–PDP–UV–UL | PCE–PCPV |
| Leader since | 5 October 1979 | 1983 | 1979 |
| Last election | 13 seats, 36.1% | Did not contest | 6 seats, 16.0% |
| Seats won | 18 | 13 | 2 |
| Seat change | ▲5 | ▲13 | ▼4 |
| Popular vote | 186,445 | 141,689 | 28,863 |
| Percentage | 48.8% | 37.1% | 7.6% |
| Swing | ▲12.7 pp | New party | ▼8.4 pp |
Mayor before election
Ricard Pérez Casado
PSOE
Mayor after election
Ricard Pérez Casado
PSOE

A municipal election was held in Valencia on 8 May 1983 to elect the 2nd City Council of the municipality. All 33 seats in the City Council were up for election. It was held concurrently with regional elections in thirteen autonomous communities and local elections all across Spain.

== Overview ==
Under the 1978 Constitution, the governance of municipalities in Spain—part of the country's local government system—was centered on the figure of city councils (Spanish: ayuntamientos), local corporations with independent legal personality composed of a mayor, a government council and an elected legislative assembly. The mayor was indirectly elected by the local assembly, requiring an absolute majority; otherwise, the candidate from the most-voted party automatically became mayor (ties were resolved by drawing lots). In the case of Valencia, the top-tier administrative and governing body was the City Council of Valencia.

=== Date ===
The term of local assemblies in Spain expired four years after the date of their previous election. The election decree was required to be issued no later than the day after the expiration date of the assemblies, with election day taking place within from 55 to 70 days after the decree's publication in the Official State Gazette (BOE).

Elections to the assemblies of local entities were officially called on 10 March 1983 with the publication of the corresponding decree in the BOE, setting election day for 8 May.

=== Electoral system ===
Voting for local assemblies was based on universal suffrage, comprising all Spanish nationals over 18 years of age, registered and residing in the municipality and with full civil and political rights.

Local councillors were elected using the D'Hondt method and closed-list proportional voting, with a five percent-threshold of valid votes (including blank ballots) in each municipality. Each municipality was a multi-member constituency, with a number of seats based on the following scale:

| Population | Councillors |
|---|---|
| <250 | 5 |
| 251–1,000 | 7 |
| 1,001–2,000 | 9 |
| 2,001–5,000 | 11 |
| 5,001–10,000 | 13 |
| 10,001–20,000 | 17 |
| 20,001–50,000 | 21 |
| 50,001–100,000 | 25 |
| >100,001 | +1 per each 100,000 inhabitants or fraction +1 if total is an even number |

The law did not provide for by-elections to fill vacant seats; instead, any vacancies arising after the proclamation of candidates and during the legislative term were filled by the next candidates on the party lists or, when required, by designated substitutes.

== Opinion polls ==
The tables below list opinion polling results in reverse chronological order, showing the most recent first and using the dates when the survey fieldwork was done, as opposed to the date of publication. Where the fieldwork dates are unknown, the date of publication is given instead. The highest percentage figure in each polling survey is displayed with its background shaded in the leading party's colour. If a tie ensues, this is applied to the figures with the highest percentages. The "Lead" column on the right shows the percentage-point difference between the parties with the highest percentages in a poll.

=== Voting intention estimates ===
The table below lists weighted voting intention estimates. Refusals are generally excluded from the party vote percentages, while question wording and the treatment of "don't know" responses and those not intending to vote may vary between polling organisations. When available, seat projections determined by the polling organisations are also displayed below (or in place of) the voting estimates in a smaller font; 17 seats were required for an absolute majority in the City Council of Valencia.

| Polling firm/Commissioner | Fieldwork date | Sample size | Turnout | UCD | PSOE | PCPV | URV | AP–PDP–UL | Lead |
|---|---|---|---|---|---|---|---|---|---|
| 1983 municipal election | 8 May 1983 | —N/a | 69.9 | – | 48.8; 18 | 7.6; 2 | 1.2; 0 | 37.1; 13 | 11.7 |
| Sofemasa/El País | 23–26 Apr 1983 | ? | ? | – | 51.2; 21/22 | 11.0; 4/5 | – | 17.0; 7/8 | 34.2 |
| 1982 general election | 28 Oct 1982 | —N/a | 84.6 | 3.4 (0) | 48.0 (19) | 4.5 (0) | 0.9 (0) | 35.2 (Note: Results for AP–PDP.) (14) | 12.8 |
| 1979 municipal election | 3 Apr 1979 | —N/a | 62.3 | 36.8; 13 | 36.1; 13 | 16.0; 6 | 5.1; 1 | – | 0.7 |

=== Voting preferences ===
The table below lists raw, unweighted voting preferences.

| Polling firm/Commissioner | Fieldwork date | Sample size | UCD | PSOE | PCPV | URV | AP–PDP–UL | CDS | Question | X mark | Lead |
|---|---|---|---|---|---|---|---|---|---|---|---|
| 1983 municipal election | 8 May 1983 | —N/a | – | 33.7 | 5.2 | 0.9 | 25.6 | 1.3 | —N/a | 31.3 | 8.1 |
| Alef–Emopública/CIS | 17–25 Mar 1983 | 514 | 0.2 | 45.1 | 3.1 | – | 9.5 | 0.9 | 32.6 | 5.3 | 35.6 |
| 1982 general election | 28 Oct 1982 | —N/a | 2.8 | 39.6 | 3.7 | 0.7 | 29.1 | 2.4 | —N/a | 15.4 | 10.5 |
| 1979 municipal election | 3 Apr 1979 | —N/a | 22.6 | 22.2 | 9.8 | 3.1 | – | – | —N/a | 37.9 | 0.4 |

== Results ==
← Summary of the 8 May 1983 City Council of Valencia election results →
| Parties and alliances | Popular vote | | | Seats | |
| Parties and alliances | Votes | % | ±pp | Total | +/− |
|---|---|---|---|---|---|
| Spanish Socialist Workers' Party (PSOE) | 186,445 | 48.83 | +12.72 | 18 | +5 |
| People's Coalition–Valencian Union (AP–PDP–UV–UL) | 141,689 | 37.11 | New | 13 | +13 |
| Communist Party of the Valencian Country (PCE–PCPV) | 28,863 | 7.56 | −8.40 | 2 | −4 |
| Democratic and Social Centre (CDS) | 7,360 | 1.93 | New | 0 | ±0 |
| Valencian People's Union (UPV)^{1} | 5,685 | 1.49 | +0.31 | 0 | ±0 |
| Valencian Regional Union (URV) | 4,717 | 1.24 | −3.87 | 0 | −1 |
| Liberal Democratic Party (PDL) | 3,225 | 0.84 | New | 0 | ±0 |
| Valencian Independent Organization (OIV) | 1,651 | 0.43 | New | 0 | ±0 |
| Popular Struggle Coalition (CLP) | 523 | 0.14 | New | 0 | ±0 |
| Union of the Democratic Centre (UCD) | n/a | n/a | −36.76 | 0 | −13 |
| Blank ballots | 1,656 | 0.43 | +0.11 | | |
| Total | 381,814 | | | 33 | ±0 |
| Valid votes | 381,814 | 98.74 | +0.18 | | |
| Invalid votes | 4,885 | 1.26 | −0.18 | | |
| Votes cast / turnout | 386,699 | 69.92 | +7.58 | | |
| Abstentions | 166,368 | 30.08 | −7.58 | | |
| Registered voters | 553,067 | | | | |
Sources
Footnotes: ^{1} Valencian People's Union results are compared to Nationalist Party of the Valencian Country totals in the 1979 election.

Popular vote
| PSOE | 48.83% |
| AP–PDP–UV–UL | 37.11% |
| PCE–PCPV | 7.56% |
| CDS | 1.93% |
| UPV | 1.49% |
| URV | 1.24% |
| Others | 1.41% |
| Blank ballots | 0.43% |

Seats
| PSOE | 54.55% |
| AP–PDP–UV–UL | 39.39% |
| PCE–PCPV | 6.06% |

== Bibliography ==
- Ley 41/1975, de 19 de noviembre, de Bases del Estatuto de Régimen Local (Law 41/1975). Official State Gazette (in Spanish). 19 November 1975. BOE-A-1975-23920.
- Ley 39/1978, de 17 de julio, de elecciones locales (Law 39/1978). Official State Gazette (in Spanish). 17 July 1978. BOE-A-1978-18636.
- Constitución Española (Constitution). Official State Gazette (in Spanish). 27 December 1978 [version as of 29 December 1978]. BOE-A-1978-31229.
- Ley Orgánica 6/1983, de 2 de marzo, por la que se modifican determinados artículos de la Ley 39/1978, de 17 de julio, de Elecciones Locales (Organic Law 6/1983). Official State Gazette (in Spanish). 2 March 1983. BOE-A-1983-6573.
- Real Decreto 448/1983, de 9 de marzo, de convocatoria de Elecciones Locales (Royal Decree 448/1983). Official State Gazette (in Spanish). 9 March 1983. BOE-A-1983-7296.
