= 1991 Valencian regional election =

Election in the Spanish region of the Valencian Community

- 26 May 1991

All 89 seats in the Corts Valencianes 45 seats needed for a majority
- Opinion polls
- Registered: 2,916,465 ▲6.9%
- Turnout: 2,019,411 (69.2%) ▼5.3 pp
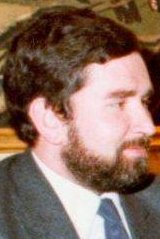

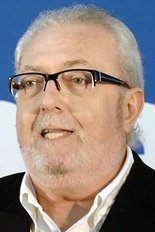

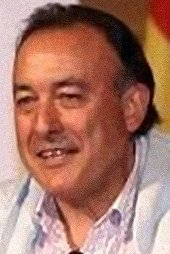

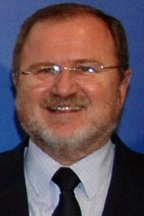

	First party	Second party	Third party
Leader	Joan Lerma	Pedro Agramunt	Héctor Villalba
Party	PSOE	PP	UV
Leader since	31 July 1979	15 December 1990	1991
Leader's seat	Valencia	Valencia	Valencia
Last election	42 seats, 41.3%	25 seats, 24.7% (Note: Results for AP (23.7%, 25 seats) and PDP–CV (1.0%, 0 seats) in the 1987 election.)	6 seats, 9.1%
Seats won	45	31	7
Seat change	▲3	▲6	▲1
Popular vote	860,429	558,617	208,126
Percentage	42.8%	27.8%	10.4%
Swing	▲1.5 pp	▲3.1 pp	▲1.3 pp
	Fourth party	Fifth party	Sixth party
Leader	Albert Taberner	Alejandro Font de Mora	Pere Mayor
Party	EU	CDS	UPV
Leader since	1986	1991	1986
Leader's seat	Valencia	Castellón (lost)	Valencia (lost)
Last election	4 seats (IU–UPV) (Note: Within the IU–UPV alliance in the 1987 election: EU (4 seats) and UPV (2 seats).)	10 seats, 11.2%	2 seats (IU–UPV)
Seats won	6	0	0
Seat change	▲2	▼10	▼2
Popular vote	151,242	76,433	73,813
Percentage	7.5%	3.8%	3.7%
Swing	n/a	▼7.4 pp	n/a
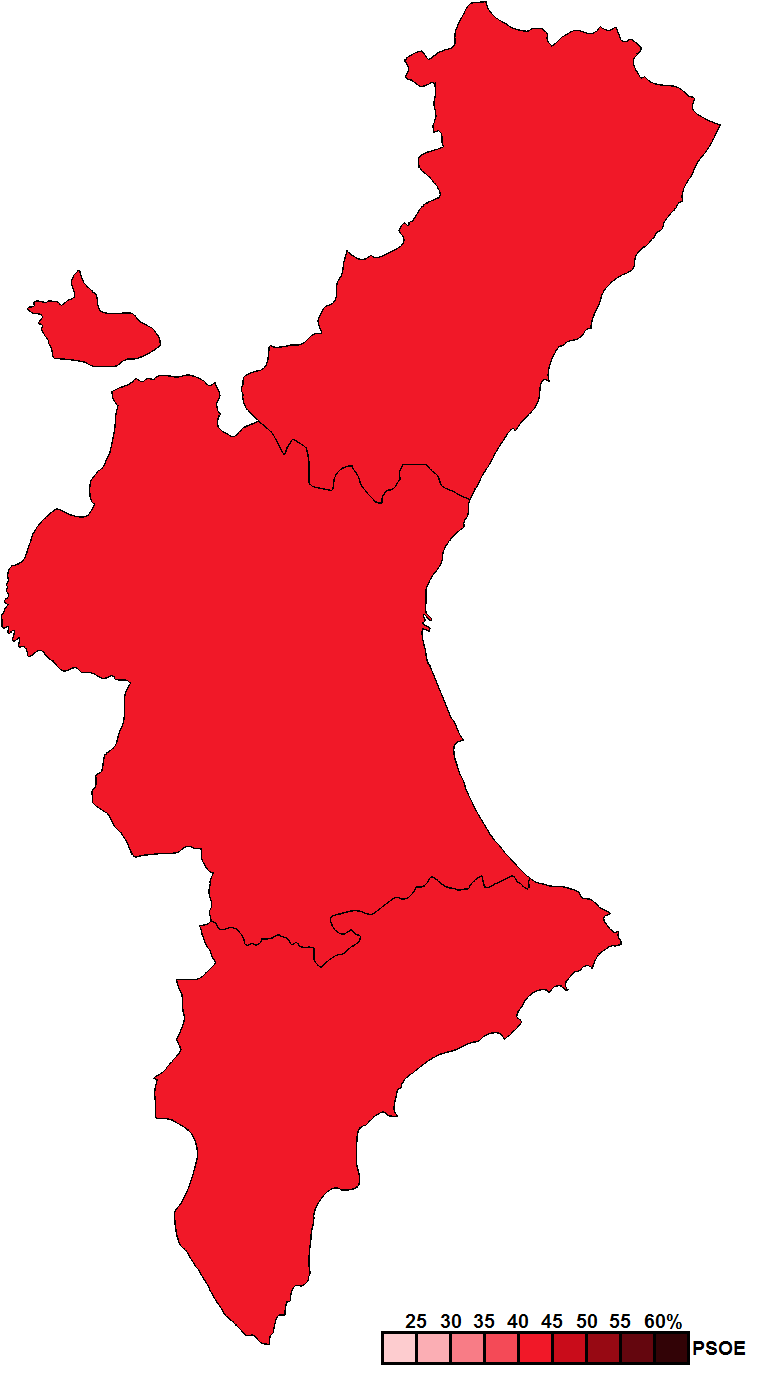
President before election
Joan Lerma
PSOE
President after election
Joan Lerma
PSOE

A regional election was held in the Valencian Community on 26 May 1991 to elect the 3rd Corts of the autonomous community. All 89 seats in the Corts were up for election. It was held concurrently with regional elections in twelve other autonomous communities and local elections all across Spain.

For the third and final time to date, the Spanish Socialist Workers' Party (PSOE) won a regional election in the Valencian Community, regaining the overall majority of seats it had lost in the 1987 election. This was the last time the PSOE was able to access the Valencian government on its own, and the last until the 2015 election in which it went on to form the regional government of the Valencian Community. The main right of centre parties, both the newly founded People's Party (PP) (a merger of the People's Alliance (AP) and other right-wing parties) and the regionalist Valencian Union (UV), came out reinforced from the election, mainly at the cost of the declining CDS. However, they were left unable to command an overall majority of seats, unlike what happened in the city of Valencia in the same year's election, in which a post-election agreement between both parties managed to oust the PSOE from the city's government and elect 1987 AP regional candidate Rita Barberá as city mayor.

As in other Spanish communities, the Democratic and Social Centre (CDS) saw a substantial drop in its vote share, causing it to fall below the 5% threshold and lose all its 10 seats. The party's poor results across Spain led to the resignation of party leader and former Prime Minister Adolfo Suárez and to the eventual demise of the CDS as a relevant actor in Spanish politics. United Left (EU) maintained the results obtained by the IU–UPV alliance in the 1987 election. Valencian People's Unity (UPV) had broken its alliance with IU in 1988 and was left out of the Corts as a result, being unable to surpass the 5% regional threshold to win seats.

== Overview ==
Under the 1982 Statute of Autonomy, the Corts Valencianes were the unicameral legislature of the Valencian Community, having legislative power in devolved matters, as well as the ability to grant or withdraw confidence from a regional president. The electoral and procedural rules were supplemented by national law provisions.

=== Date ===
The term of the Corts Valencianes expired four years after the date of their previous election, with amendments earlier in 1991 fixing election day for the fourth Sunday of May every four years. The election decree was required to be issued between 54 and 60 days before the scheduled election date and published on the following day in the Official Journal of the Valencian Government (DOGV). The previous election was held on 10 June 1987, setting the date for election day on the fourth Sunday of May four years later, which was 26 May 1991.

The Corts Valencianes could not be dissolved before the expiration date of parliament.

The Corts Valencianes were officially dissolved on 2 April 1991 with the publication of the corresponding decree in the DOGV, setting election day for 26 May and scheduling for the chamber to reconvene on 18 June.

=== Electoral system ===
Voting for the Corts was based on universal suffrage, comprising all Spanish nationals over 18 years of age, registered in the Valencian Community and with full political rights, provided that they had not been deprived of the right to vote by a final sentence, nor were legally incapacitated.

The Corts Valencianes had a minimum of 75 and a maximum of 100 seats, with the electoral law fixing its size at 89. All were elected in three multi-member constituencies—corresponding to the provinces of Alicante, Castellón and Valencia, each of which was assigned an initial minimum of 20 seats and the remaining 29 distributed in proportion to population (with the seat-to-population ratio in any given province not exceeding three times that of any other)—using the D'Hondt method and closed-list proportional voting, with a five percent-threshold of valid votes (including blank ballots) regionally.

As a result of the aforementioned allocation, each Corts constituency was entitled the following seats:

Seats	Constituencies
37	Valencia
30	Alicante^{(+1)}
22	Castellón^{(−1)}

The law did not provide for by-elections to fill vacant seats; instead, any vacancies arising after the proclamation of candidates and during the legislative term were filled by the next candidates on the party lists or, when required, by designated substitutes.

=== Outgoing parliament ===
The table below shows the composition of the parliamentary groups in the chamber at the time of dissolution.

Parliamentary composition in April 1991
Groups	Parties	Legislators	
Groups	Parties	Seats	Total
Socialist Parliamentary Group	PSOE	42	42
People's Parliamentary Group	PP	22	22
CDS Parliamentary Group	CDS	11	11
Valencian Union Parliamentary Group	UV	8	8
United Left Parliamentary Group	EU	4	4
Mixed Group	UPV	2	2

== Parties and candidates ==
The electoral law allowed for parties and federations registered in the interior ministry, alliances and groupings of electors to present lists of candidates. Parties and federations intending to form an alliance were required to inform the relevant electoral commission within 10 days of the election call, whereas groupings of electors needed to secure the signature of at least one percent of the electorate in the constituencies for which they sought election, disallowing electors from signing for more than one list.

Below is a list of the main parties and alliances which contested the election:

Candidacy	Parties and alliances	Leading candidate	Ideology	Previous result		Gov.	Ref.
Candidacy	Parties and alliances	Leading candidate	Ideology	Vote %	Seats	Gov.	Ref.
PSOE	List: Spanish Socialist Workers' Party (PSOE)	Joan Lerma	Social democracy	41.3%	42	Yes	
PP	List: People's Party (PP)	Pedro Agramunt	Conservatism; Christian democracy	24.7%	25	No	
CDS	List: Democratic and Social Centre (CDS)	Alejandro Font de Mora	Centrism; Liberalism	11.2%	10	No	
UV	List: Valencian Union (UV)	Héctor Villalba	Blaverism; Conservatism	9.1%	6	No	
EU	List: Communist Party of the Valencian Country (PCPV); Socialist Action Party (PASOC); Republican Left (IR)	Albert Taberner	Socialism; Communism	7.9%	6	No	
UPV	List: Valencian People's Union (UPV)	Pere Mayor	Valencian nationalism Socialism	7.9%	6	No	

== Opinion polls ==
The tables below list opinion polling results in reverse chronological order, showing the most recent first and using the dates when the survey fieldwork was done, as opposed to the date of publication. Where the fieldwork dates are unknown, the date of publication is given instead. The highest percentage figure in each polling survey is displayed with its background shaded in the leading party's colour. If a tie ensues, this is applied to the figures with the highest percentages. The "Lead" column on the right shows the percentage-point difference between the parties with the highest percentages in a poll.

=== Voting intention estimates ===
The table below lists weighted voting intention estimates. Refusals are generally excluded from the party vote percentages, while question wording and the treatment of "don't know" responses and those not intending to vote may vary between polling organisations. When available, seat projections determined by the polling organisations are displayed below (or in place of) the percentages in a smaller font; 45 seats were required for an absolute majority in the Corts Valencianes.

Polling firm/Commissioner	Fieldwork date	Sample size	Turnout	PSOE	AP	CDS	UV	EU	UPV	LV	PDP	PP	Lead
1991 regional election	26 May 1991	—N/a	69.2	42.8; 45	(Note: Within PP.)	3.8; 0	10.4; 7	7.5; 6	3.7; 0	1.8; 0		27.8; 31	15.0
Sigma Dos/El Mundo	18 May 1991	?	?	40.0; 41/43		5.1; 4/5	10.9; 8/9	9.1; 7/9	3.2; 0	3.4; 0		23.0; 25/27	17.0
Metra Seis/El Independiente	12 May 1991	?	?	40.4; 42/44		7.0; 7	10.2; 7/8	7.8; 6	3.1; 0	1.0; 0		23.6; 25/27	16.8
Demoscopia/El País	4–7 May 1991	650	?	39.4; 44		4.5; 0	10.8; 7	8.3; 8	–	3.8; 0		28.3; 30	11.1
1989 general election	29 Oct 1989	—N/a	74.8	41.5 (42)		7.8 (7)	6.8 (4)	9.1 (8)	1.9 (0)	1.7 (0)		27.0 (28)	14.5
1989 EP election	15 Jun 1989	—N/a	61.7	42.7 (46)		7.5 (7)	6.8 (5)	5.9 (6)	2.6 (0)	1.0 (0)		22.7 (25)	20.0
1987 regional election	10 Jun 1987	—N/a	74.5	41.3; 42	23.7; 25	11.2; 10	9.1; 6	7.9; 6		1.1; 0	1.0; 0	–	17.6

== Results ==
=== Overall ===
← Summary of the 26 May 1991 Corts Valencianes election results →
Parties and alliances	Popular vote			Seats	
Parties and alliances	Votes	%	±pp	Total	+/−
Spanish Socialist Workers' Party (PSOE)	860,429	42.85	+1.57	45	+3
People's Party (PP)^{1}	558,617	27.82	+3.11	31	+6
Valencian Union (UV)	208,126	10.36	+1.22	7	+1
United Left of the Valencian Country (EU)^{2}	151,242	7.53	n/a	6	+2
Democratic and Social Centre (CDS)	76,433	3.81	−7.43	0	−10
Valencian People's Union (UPV)^{2}	73,813	3.68	n/a	0	−2
The Greens (LV)	35,375	1.76	+0.65	0	±0
The Greens of Alicante–Green Union (LVA–UVE)	5,569	0.28	New	0	±0
Socialist Democracy (DS)	5,207	0.26	New	0	±0
Cantonalist Party of the Alicantine Country (Alicantón)	4,119	0.21	New	0	±0
Left Platform (PCE (m–l)–CRPE)^{3}	2,758	0.14	−0.02	0	±0
Valencian Nationalist Union (UNV)^{4}	2,248	0.11	−0.10	0	±0
National Front (FN)	2,184	0.11	New	0	±0
Alliance for the Republic (AxR)^{5}	1,383	0.07	−0.02	0	±0
Blank ballots	20,606	1.03	−0.04		
Total	2,008,109			89	±0
Valid votes	2,008,109	99.44	+0.56		
Invalid votes	11,302	0.56	−0.56		
Votes cast / turnout	2,019,411	69.24	−5.21		
Abstentions	897,054	30.76	+5.21		
Registered voters	2,916,465				
Sources
Footnotes: ^{1} People's Party results are compared to the combined totals of People's Alliance and People's Democratic Party–Valencian Centrists in the 1987 election.; ^{2} Within the United Left–Valencian People's Union alliance in the 1987 election.; ^{3} Left Platform results are compared to Republican Popular Unity totals in the 1987 election.; ^{4} Valencian Nationalist Union results are compared to Valencian Nationalist Left totals in the 1987 election.; ^{5} Alliance for the Republic results are compared to Internationalist Socialist Workers' Party totals in the 1987 election.

Popular vote
PSOE	42.85%
PP	27.82%
UV	10.36%
EU	7.53%
CDS	3.81%
UPV	3.68%
LV	1.76%
Others	1.17%
Blank ballots	1.03%

Seats
PSOE	50.56%
PP	34.83%
UV	7.87%
EU	6.74%

=== Distribution by constituency ===
Constituency	PSOE		PP		UV		EU	
Constituency	%	S	%	S	%	S	%	S
Alicante	44.6	16	33.1	12	1.7	−	7.3	2
Castellón	41.4	11	35.3	9	5.2	1	4.8	1
Valencia	42.2	18	23.3	10	16.3	6	8.3	3
Total	42.8	45	27.8	31	10.4	7	7.5	6

== Aftermath ==
=== Government formation ===
Investiture
Candidate	Ballot →	9 July 1991	
Candidate	Required majority →	45 out of 89	
Joan Lerma (PSOE)	Yes: • PSOE (45)	45 / 89	check
Joan Lerma (PSOE)	No: • PP (31); • UV (7); • EU (6)	44 / 89	check
Joan Lerma (PSOE)	Abstentions	0 / 89	check
Joan Lerma (PSOE)	Absentees	0 / 89	check
Pedro Agramunt (PP)	Yes: • PP (31)	31 / 89	X mark
Pedro Agramunt (PP)	No: • PSOE (45); • UV (7); • EU (6)	58 / 89	X mark
Pedro Agramunt (PP)	Abstentions	0 / 89	X mark
Pedro Agramunt (PP)	Absentees	0 / 89	X mark
Héctor Villalba (UV)	Yes: • UV (7)	7 / 89	X mark
Héctor Villalba (UV)	No: • PSOE (45); • PP (31); • EU (6)	82 / 89	X mark
Héctor Villalba (UV)	Abstentions	0 / 89	X mark
Héctor Villalba (UV)	Absentees	0 / 89	X mark
Albert Taberner (EU)	Yes: • EU (6)	6 / 89	X mark
Albert Taberner (EU)	No: • PSOE (45); • PP (31); • UV (7)	83 / 89	X mark
Albert Taberner (EU)	Abstentions	0 / 89	X mark
Albert Taberner (EU)	Absentees	0 / 89	X mark

== Bibliography ==
- Ley Orgánica 5/1982, de 1 de julio, de Estatuto de Autonomía de la Comunidad Valenciana (Organic Law 1/1982). Official State Gazette (in Spanish). 1 July 1982 [version as of 14 March 1991]. BOE-A-1982-17235.
- Ley 5/1983, de 30 de diciembre, de Gobierno Valenciano (Law 5/1983). Official State Gazette (in Spanish). 30 December 1983 [version as of 4 January 1991]. BOE-A-1984-3460.
- Ley Orgánica 5/1985, de 19 de junio, del Régimen Electoral General (Organic Law 5/1985). Official State Gazette (in Spanish). 19 June 1985 [version as of 14 March 1991]. BOE-A-1985-11672.
- Ley 1/1987, de 31 de marzo, Electoral Valenciana (Law 1/1987). Official State Gazette (in Spanish). 31 March 1987 [version as of 6 April 1987]. BOE-A-1987-9636.
- Decreto 4/1991, de 1 de abril, del Presidente de la Generalitat Valenciana, de disolución de las Cortes Valencianas y convocatoria de elecciones a las mismas (PDF) (Decree 4/1991). Official Journal of the Valencian Government (in Spanish). 1 April 1991.
