= 1979 Valencia municipal election =

Election in the Spanish municipality of Valencia

- 3 April 1979

All 33 seats in the City Council of Valencia 17 seats needed for a majority
- Registered: 552,034
- Turnout: 344,145 (62.3%)

	First party	Second party	Third party
Leader	Miguel Pastor	Fernando Martínez Castellano	Pedro Zamora
Party	UCD	PSOE	PCPV
Leader since	1979	1979	1979
Seats won	13	13	6
Popular vote	124,683	122,482	54,124
Percentage	36.8%	36.1%	16.0%
Mayor before election
Miguel Ramón Izquierdo
URV
Mayor after election
Fernando Martínez Castellano
PSOE

A municipal election was held in Valencia on 3 April 1979 to elect the 1st City Council of the municipality. All 33 seats in the City Council were up for election. It was held concurrently with local elections all across Spain.

== Overview ==
Under the 1978 Constitution, the governance of municipalities in Spain—part of the country's local government system—was centered on the figure of city councils (Spanish: ayuntamientos), local corporations with independent legal personality composed of a mayor, a government council and an elected legislative assembly. The mayor was indirectly elected by the local assembly, requiring an absolute majority; otherwise, the candidate from the most-voted party automatically became mayor (ties were resolved by drawing lots). In the case of Valencia, the top-tier administrative and governing body was the City Council of Valencia.

=== Date ===
The term of local assemblies in Spain expired four years after the date of their previous election. The election decree was required to be issued no later than the day after the expiration date of the assemblies, with election day taking place 65 days after the decree's publication in the Official State Gazette (BOE).

Elections to the assemblies of local entities were officially called on 27 January 1979 with the publication of the corresponding decree in the BOE, setting election day for 3 April.

=== Electoral system ===
Voting for local assemblies was based on universal suffrage, comprising all Spanish nationals over 18 years of age, registered and residing in the municipality and with full civil and political rights.

Local councillors were elected using the D'Hondt method and closed-list proportional voting, with a five percent-threshold of valid votes (including blank ballots) in each municipality. Each municipality was a multi-member constituency, with a number of seats based on the following scale:

Population	Councillors
<250	5
251–1,000	7
1,001–2,000	9
2,001–5,000	11
5,001–10,000	13
10,001–20,000	17
20,001–50,000	21
50,001–100,000	25
>100,001	+1 per each 100,000 inhabitants or fraction +1 if total is an even number

The law did not provide for by-elections to fill vacant seats; instead, any vacancies arising after the proclamation of candidates and during the legislative term were filled by the next candidates on the party lists or, when required, by designated substitutes.

== Parties and candidates ==
The electoral law allowed for parties and federations registered in the interior ministry, alliances and groupings of electors to present lists of candidates. Parties and federations intending to form an alliance were required to inform the relevant electoral commission within 10 days of the election call, whereas groupings of electors needed to secure the signature of a determined amount of the electors registered in the municipality for which they sought election, disallowing electors from signing for more than one list. In the case of Valencia, as its population was between 300,001 and 1,000,000, at least 2,000 signatures were required.

Below is a list of the main parties and alliances which contested the election:

Candidacy	Parties and alliances	Leading candidate	Ideology	Gov.	Ref.
UCD	List: Union of the Democratic Centre (UCD)	Miguel Pastor	Centrism	No	
PSOE	List: Spanish Socialist Workers' Party (PSOE)	Fernando Martínez Castellano	Social democracy	No	
PCE	List: Communist Party of Spain (PCE)	Pedro Zamora	Eurocommunism	No	
URV	List: Valencian Regional Union (URV)	Miguel Ramón Izquierdo	Valencianism; Blaverism	Yes	

== Results ==
Summary of the 3 April 1979 City Council of Valencia election results →
Parties and alliances	Popular vote			Seats	
Parties and alliances	Votes	%	±pp	Total	+/−
Union of the Democratic Centre (UCD)	124,683	36.76	n/a	13	n/a
Spanish Socialist Workers' Party (PSOE)	122,482	36.11	n/a	13	n/a
Communist Party of the Valencian Country (PCPV)	54,124	15.96	n/a	6	n/a
Valencian Regional Union (URV)	17,342	5.11	n/a	1	n/a
Communist Movement of the Valencian Country (MCPV)	4,131	1.22	n/a	0	n/a
Nationalist Party of the Valencian Country (PNPV)	4,010	1.18	n/a	0	n/a
Workers' Revolutionary Organization (ORT)	2,838	0.84	n/a	0	n/a
Workers' Communist Party (PCT)	1,820	0.54	n/a	0	n/a
Communist Unification of Spain (UCE)	1,656	0.49	n/a	0	n/a
Valencian Front Socialist–Republican Alliance (ARSFV)	1,394	0.41	n/a	0	n/a
Republican Left (IR)	1,313	0.39	n/a	0	n/a
Left Bloc for National Liberation of the Valencian Country (BEANPV)	1,181	0.35	n/a	0	n/a
Liberal Party (PL)	618	0.18	n/a	0	n/a
Revolutionary Communist League (LCR)	508	0.15	n/a	0	n/a
Blank ballots	1,102	0.32	n/a		
Total	339,202			33	n/a
Valid votes	339,202	98.56	n/a		
Invalid votes	4,943	1.44	n/a		
Votes cast / turnout	344,145	62.34	n/a		
Abstentions	207,889	37.66	n/a		
Registered voters	552,034				

Popular vote
UCD	36.76%
PSOE	36.11%
PCPV	15.96%
URV	5.11%
MCPV	1.22%
PNPV	1.18%
Others	3.34%
Blank ballots	0.32%

Seats
UCD	39.39%
PSOE	39.39%
PCPV	18.18%
URV	3.03%

== Bibliography ==
- Ley 41/1975, de 19 de noviembre, de Bases del Estatuto de Régimen Local (Law 41/1975). Official State Gazette (in Spanish). 19 November 1975. BOE-A-1975-23920.
- Ley 39/1978, de 17 de julio, de elecciones locales (Law 39/1978). Official State Gazette (in Spanish). 17 July 1978. BOE-A-1978-18636.
- Constitución Española (Constitution). Official State Gazette (in Spanish). 27 December 1978 [version as of 29 December 1978]. BOE-A-1978-31229.
- Real Decreto 117/1979, de 26 de enero, de convocatoria de Elecciones Locales (Royal Decree 117/1979). Official State Gazette (in Spanish). 26 January 1979. BOE-A-1979-2570.
