= Martín Quirós =

Spanish politician (1929–2022)

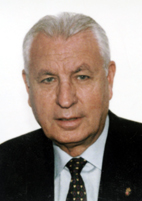

Member of the Corts Valencianes
- In office 1991–2002

Personal details
- Born: Martín Quirós Palau; 27 April 1929 Valencia, Spain
- Died: 17 February 2022 (aged 92) Valencia, Spain
- Party: PP

Martín Quirós Palau (27 April 1929 – 17 February 2022) was a Spanish politician and anesthesiologist.

A member of People's Alliance and its successor, the People's Party, he served in the City Council of Valencia from 1983 to 1991, and later in the Corts Valencianes from 1991 to 2002. He died in Valencia on 17 February 2022, at the age of 92.
