= 1995 Valencian regional election =

Election in the Spanish region of the Valencian Community

- 28 May 1995

All 89 seats in the Corts Valencianes 45 seats needed for a majority
- Opinion polls
- Registered: 3,131,191 ▲7.4%
- Turnout: 2,380,614 (76.0%) ▲6.8 pp
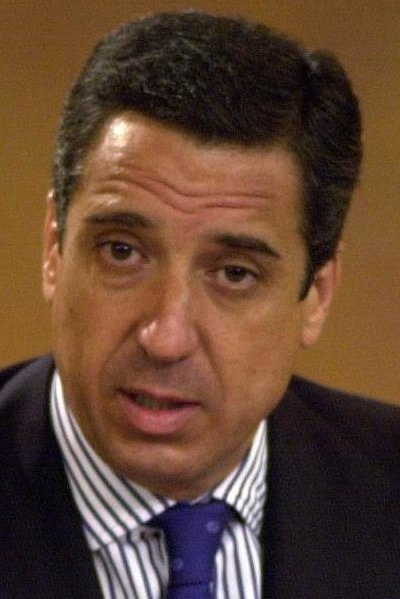

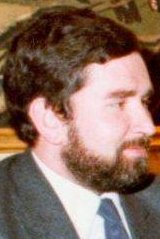

	First party	Second party	Third party
Leader	Eduardo Zaplana	Joan Lerma	Albert Taberner
Party	PP	PSOE	EU–EV
Leader since	26 September 1993	31 July 1979	1986
Leader's seat	Valencia	Valencia	Valencia
Last election	31 seats, 27.8%	45 seats, 42.8%	6 seats, 9.3% (Note: Results for EU (7.5%, 6 seats) and LV (1.8%, 0 seats) in the 1991 election.)
Seats won	42	32	10
Seat change	▲11	▼13	▲4
Popular vote	1,013,859	804,463	273,030
Percentage	42.8%	34.0%	11.5%
Swing	▲15.0 pp	▼8.8 pp	▲2.2 pp
	Fourth party
Leader	Vicente González Lizondo
Party	UV–FICVA–CCV
Leader since	1995
Leader's seat	Valencia
Last election	7 seats, 10.4%
Seats won	5
Seat change	▼2
Popular vote	165,956
Percentage	7.0%
Swing	▼3.4 pp
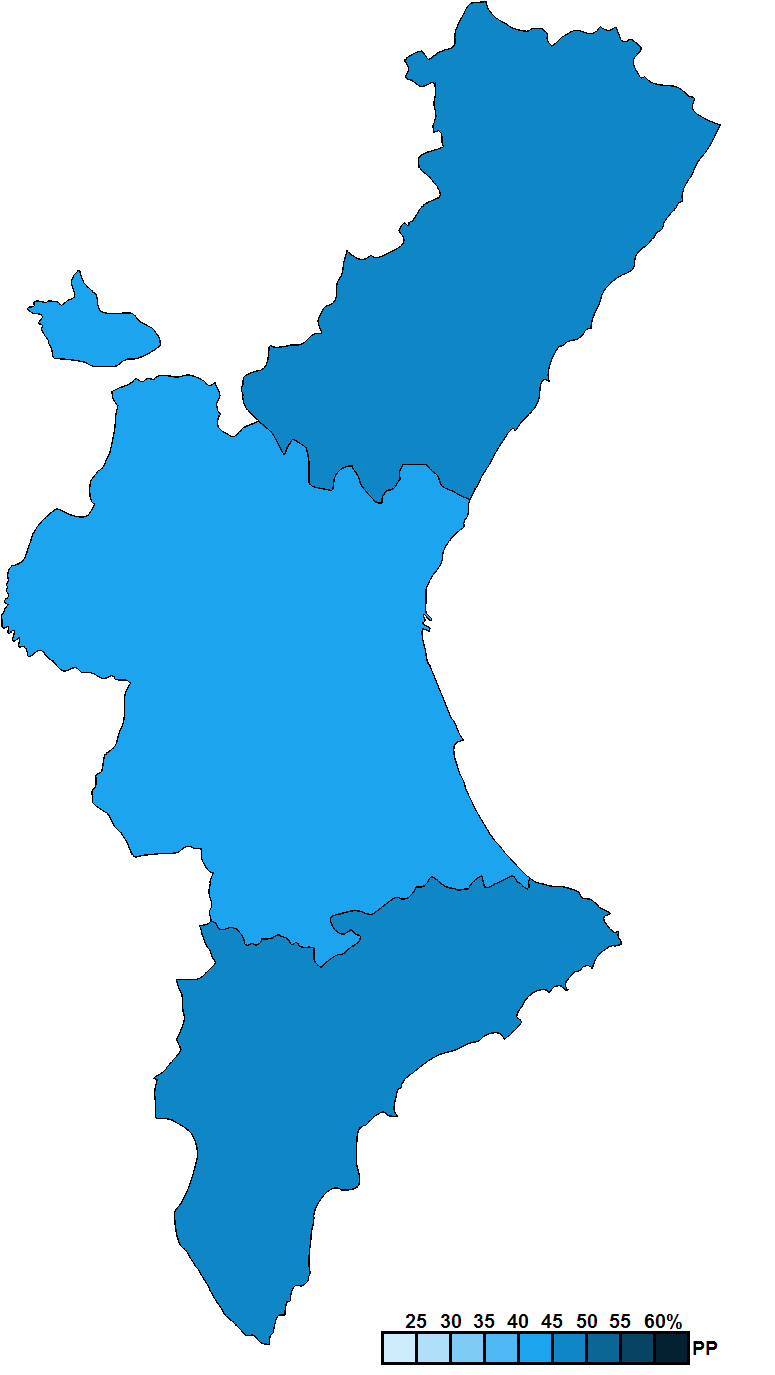
President before election
Joan Lerma
PSOE
President after election
Eduardo Zaplana
PP

A regional election was held in the Valencian Community on 28 May 1995 to elect the 4th Corts of the autonomous community. All 89 seats in the Corts were up for election. It was held concurrently with regional elections in twelve other autonomous communities and local elections all across Spain.

As a result of the election, the People's Party (PP) increased its vote share by 15 percentage points relative to the 1991 election. For the first time, the PP had won a regional election, becoming the first party to poll more than 1 million votes in the area and gaining eleven seats, 3 short of an absolute majority. Most of the gains came from Spanish Socialist Workers' Party (PSOE), which lost 13 seats in the election. The regionalist Valencian Union (UV) also lost 1 seat, while United Left (IU) gained 4 seats to overtake UV as the third largest party.

A coalition agreement between the PP and UV was able to force the PSOE out from the Valencian Government after 12 years of Socialist rule. Eduardo Zaplana, the PP candidate, became the second democratically elected president of the autonomous community.

== Background ==
After 12 years of consecutive Socialist governments both in the Spanish national government and in the Valencian Community, the People's Party (PP) had managed to greatly increase its support from 1992–93, mostly at the cost of what remained of the Democratic and Social Centre (CDS). In the 1993 general election, the PP had already increased its vote share from 27.0% in 1989 to 40.5% and had overtaken the Spanish Socialist Workers' Party (PSOE) in the region for the first time. The party had also seen a dramatical rise in the 1994 European Parliament election, rising to 44.2% from 22.8% in 1989.

United Left (IU) had gained ground at the expense of the PSOE and in both the 1993 general and 1994 EP elections had polled more than 10% for the first time since the 1970s. After peaking in the 1991 regional and local elections, the right-wing regional party Valencian Union (UV) had begun to lose ground in the 1993 and 1994 elections.

Population's weariness of PSOE's prolonged stay in power, economic crisis as well as the eruption of numerous corruption scandals at the national level had weakened the PSOE in the region to the point it was facing the possibility of a severe defeat for the first time in a decade. Joan Lerma's management of a wildfire crisis in the summer of 1994 came under heavy criticism, after the fire had resulted in the burning of 16% of the region's forest area.

== Overview ==
Under the 1982 Statute of Autonomy, the Corts Valencianes were the unicameral legislature of the Valencian Community, having legislative power in devolved matters, as well as the ability to grant or withdraw confidence from a regional president. The electoral and procedural rules were supplemented by national law provisions.

=== Date ===
The term of the Corts Valencianes expired four years after the date of their previous election, with election day being fixed for the fourth Sunday of May every four years. The election decree was required to be issued no later than 54 days before the scheduled election date and published on the following day in the Official Journal of the Valencian Government (DOGV). The previous election was held on 26 May 1991, setting the date for election day on the fourth Sunday of May four years later, which was 28 May 1995.

The Corts Valencianes could not be dissolved before the expiration date of parliament.

The Corts Valencianes were officially dissolved on 4 April 1995 with the publication of the corresponding decree in the DOGV, setting election day for 28 May and scheduling for the chamber to reconvene on 20 June.

=== Electoral system ===
Voting for the Corts was based on universal suffrage, comprising all Spanish nationals over 18 years of age, registered in the Valencian Community and with full political rights, provided that they had not been deprived of the right to vote by a final sentence, nor were legally incapacitated.

The Corts Valencianes had a minimum of 75 and a maximum of 100 seats, with the electoral law fixing its size at 89. All were elected in three multi-member constituencies—corresponding to the provinces of Alicante, Castellón and Valencia, each of which was assigned an initial minimum of 20 seats and the remaining 29 distributed in proportion to population (with the seat-to-population ratio in any given province not exceeding three times that of any other)—using the D'Hondt method and closed-list proportional voting, with a five percent-threshold of valid votes (including blank ballots) regionally.

As a result of the aforementioned allocation, each Corts constituency was entitled the following seats:

Seats	Constituencies
37	Valencia
30	Alicante
22	Castellón

The law did not provide for by-elections to fill vacant seats; instead, any vacancies arising after the proclamation of candidates and during the legislative term were filled by the next candidates on the party lists or, when required, by designated substitutes.

=== Outgoing parliament ===
The table below shows the composition of the parliamentary groups in the chamber at the time of dissolution.

Parliamentary composition in April 1995
Groups	Parties	Legislators	
Groups	Parties	Seats	Total
Socialist Parliamentary Group	PSOE	45	45
People's Parliamentary Group	PP	31	31
United Left Parliamentary Group	EU	6	6
Valencian Union Nationalist Parliamentary Group	UV	4	4
Mixed Group	INDEP	3 (Note: Daniel Ansuátegui, former PP legislator; Miquel Ramón and Rosario Vicent, former UV legislators.)	3

== Parties and candidates ==
The electoral law allowed for parties and federations registered in the interior ministry, alliances and groupings of electors to present lists of candidates. Parties and federations intending to form an alliance were required to inform the relevant electoral commission within 10 days of the election call, whereas groupings of electors needed to secure the signature of at least one percent of the electorate in the constituencies for which they sought election, disallowing electors from signing for more than one list.

Below is a list of the main parties and alliances which contested the election:

Candidacy	Parties and alliances	Leading candidate	Ideology	Previous result		Gov.	Ref.
Candidacy	Parties and alliances	Leading candidate	Ideology	Vote %	Seats	Gov.	Ref.
PSOE	List: Spanish Socialist Workers' Party (PSOE)	Joan Lerma	Social democracy	42.8%	45	Yes	
PP	List: People's Party (PP)	Eduardo Zaplana	Conservatism; Christian democracy	27.8%	31	No	
UV– FICVA– CCV	List: Valencian Union (UV); Independents' Federation of the Valencian Community (FICVA); Centrists of the Valencian Community (CCV)	Vicente González Lizondo	Blaverism; Conservatism	10.4%	7	No	
EU–EV	List: United Left of the Valencian Country (EUPV) – Communist Party of the Valencian Country (PCPV) – Socialist Action Party (PASOC) – Republican Left (IR); The Greens (EV/LV)	Albert Taberner	Socialism; Communism	9.3%	6	No	

== Opinion polls ==
The tables below list opinion polling results in reverse chronological order, showing the most recent first and using the dates when the survey fieldwork was done, as opposed to the date of publication. Where the fieldwork dates are unknown, the date of publication is given instead. The highest percentage figure in each polling survey is displayed with its background shaded in the leading party's colour. If a tie ensues, this is applied to the figures with the highest percentages. The "Lead" column on the right shows the percentage-point difference between the parties with the highest percentages in a poll.

=== Voting intention estimates ===
The table below lists weighted voting intention estimates. Refusals are generally excluded from the party vote percentages, while question wording and the treatment of "don't know" responses and those not intending to vote may vary between polling organisations. When available, seat projections determined by the polling organisations are displayed below (or in place of) the percentages in a smaller font; 45 seats were required for an absolute majority in the Corts Valencianes.

Color key:

Exit poll

Polling firm/Commissioner	Fieldwork date	Sample size	Turnout	PSOE	PP	UV	EUPV	Lead
1995 regional election	28 May 1995	—N/a	76.0	34.0; 32	42.8; 42	7.0; 5	11.5; 10	8.8
Eco Consulting/RTVE	28 May 1995	?	?	31.3; 30/31	43.5; 42/45	6.5; 3/5	15.0; 9/12	12.2
Emer–GfK/Levante-EMV	21 May 1995	?	?	? 32/34	? 42/45	? 0/4	? 10/11	?
Gesfono/Las Provincias	10–15 May 1995	?	?	30.1; 28/31	46.0; 43/46	6.0; 3/4	13.2; 11/12	15.9
Demoscopia/El País	10–15 May 1995	1,200	?	29.1; 29	44.0; 43	6.6; 6	13.3; 11	14.9
CIS (Note: "Preelectoral Autonómicas Comunidad Valenciana (Estudio nº 2167. Abril-Mayo 1995)". CIS (in Spanish). 10 May 1995. Archived from the original on 31 July 2017.)	24 Apr–10 May 1995	1,598	72.3	30.7	46.5	6.7	10.9	15.8
Perfiles	7 May 1995	?	?	? 32/34	? 42/45	? 0/4	? 10/11	?
Gesfono/Las Provincias	30 Apr 1995	?	?	30.1; 29/30	45.2; 43/44	6.2; 4	13.5; 12	15.1
1994 EP election	12 Jun 1994	—N/a	65.0	30.5 (29)	44.2 (45)	5.3 (3)	13.9 (12)	13.7
1993 general election	6 Jun 1993	—N/a	81.7	38.4 (39)	40.5 (41)	4.6 (0)	10.5 (9)	2.1
1991 regional election	26 May 1991	—N/a	69.2	42.8; 45	27.8; 31	10.4; 7	7.5; 6	15.0

=== Voting preferences ===
The table below lists raw, unweighted voting preferences.

Polling firm/Commissioner	Fieldwork date	Sample size	PSOE	PP	UV	EUPV	CDS	UPV	Question	X mark	Lead
1995 regional election (Note: Does not include non-resident citizens.)	28 May 1995	—N/a	25.8	32.7	5.3	8.8	0.2	2.1	—N/a	23.4	6.9
CIS	24 Apr–10 May 1995	1,598	26.9	30.0	3.3	7.3	0.4	–	23.1	5.8	3.1
CIS	2–17 Mar 1995	1,600	24.9	24.2	5.1	9.5	0.7	–	24.0	7.5	0.7
1994 EP election	12 Jun 1994	—N/a	19.8	28.8	3.4	9.1	0.6	1.2	—N/a	34.7	9.0
CIS	26 Apr–8 Jun 1994	1,575	26.1	26.3	5.7	9.1	0.5	–	21.5	7.5	0.2
1993 general election	6 Jun 1993	—N/a	31.3	33.1	3.8	8.6	1.3	1.4	—N/a	17.9	1.8
CIS	7–19 Nov 1992	1,780	27.6	14.9	6.1	6.4	1.1	–	30.4	11.5	12.7
CIS	14–26 Jan 1992	1,599	39.2	13.4	4.9	4.9	1.3	2.1	25.6	7.6	25.8
1991 regional election	26 May 1991	—N/a	29.4	19.1	7.1	5.2	2.6	2.5	—N/a	30.7	10.3

=== Victory preferences ===
The table below lists opinion polling on the victory preferences for each party in the event of a regional election taking place.

Polling firm/Commissioner	Fieldwork date	Sample size	PSOE	PP	EUPV	Other/ None	Question	Lead
CIS	24 Apr–10 May 1995	1,598	34.8	37.5	–	1.1	26.7	2.7
CIS	2–17 Mar 1995	1,600	40.4	38.1	–	–	21.5	2.3
CIS	26 Apr–8 Jun 1994	1,575	31.7	33.8	12.6	–	21.9	2.1

=== Victory likelihood ===
The table below lists opinion polling on the perceived likelihood of victory for each party in the event of a regional election taking place.

Polling firm/Commissioner	Fieldwork date	Sample size	PSOE	PP	Other/ None	Question	Lead
CIS	24 Apr–10 May 1995	1,598	19.6	48.5	–	31.9	28.9
CIS	2–17 Mar 1995	1,600	29.3	43.7	–	27.0	14.4

=== Preferred President ===
The table below lists opinion polling on leader preferences to become president of the Valencian Government.

Polling firm/Commissioner	Fieldwork date	Sample size			Other/ None/ Not care	Question	Lead
Polling firm/Commissioner	Fieldwork date	Sample size	Lerma PSOE	Zaplana PP	Other/ None/ Not care	Question	Lead
CIS	24 Apr–10 May 1995	1,598	44.6	32.7	3.9	18.8	11.9
CIS	2–17 Mar 1995	1,600	42.2	27.0	5.1	25.8	15.2

== Results ==
=== Overall ===
← Summary of the 28 May 1995 Corts Valencianes election results →
Parties and alliances	Popular vote			Seats	
Parties and alliances	Votes	%	±pp	Total	+/−
People's Party (PP)	1,013,859	42.83	+15.01	42	+11
Spanish Socialist Workers' Party (PSOE)	804,463	33.98	−8.87	32	−13
United Left–The Greens (EU–EV)^{1}	273,030	11.53	+2.24	10	+4
Valencian Union–Independents–Centrists (UV–FICVA–CCV)	165,956	7.01	−3.35	5	−2
Valencian People's Union–Nationalist Bloc (UPV–BN)	64,253	2.71	−0.97	0	±0
Democratic and Social Centre (CDS)	5,480	0.23	−3.58	0	±0
Communist Party of the Peoples of Spain (PCPE)	3,772	0.16	+0.02	0	±0
United Alicante (AU)	2,894	0.12	New	0	±0
Autonomist Republican Party (PRA)	2,232	0.09	New	0	±0
Valencian Nationalist Left (ENV)^{2}	1,861	0.08	−0.03	0	±0
Spanish Phalanx of the CNSO (FE–JONS)	1,762	0.07	New	0	±0
Platform of Independents of Spain (PIE)	1,659	0.07	New	0	±0
Humanist Platform (PH–LE)	773	0.03	New	0	±0
Spanish Autonomous League (LAE)	542	0.02	New	0	±0
Blank ballots	24,864	1.05	+0.02		
Total	2,367,400			89	±0
Valid votes	2,367,400	99.44	±0.00		
Invalid votes	13,214	0.56	±0.00		
Votes cast / turnout	2,380,614	76.03	+6.79		
Abstentions	750,577	23.97	−6.79		
Registered voters	3,131,191				
Sources
Footnotes: ^{1} United Left–The Greens results are compared to the combined totals of United Left of the Valencian Country and The Greens in the 1991 election.; ^{2} Valencian Nationalist Left results are compared to Valencian Nationalist Union totals in the 1991 election.

Popular vote
PP	42.83%
PSOE	33.98%
EU–EV	11.53%
UV–FICVA–CCV	7.01%
UPV–BN	2.71%
Others	0.89%
Blank ballots	1.05%

Seats
PP	47.19%
PSOE	35.96%
EU–EV	11.24%
UV–FICVA–CCV	5.62%

=== Distribution by constituency ===
Constituency	PP		PSOE		EU–EV		UV–FI–C	
Constituency	%	S	%	S	%	S	%	S
Alicante	46.7	15	36.0	12	10.9	3	2.1	−
Castellón	45.6	11	35.6	8	8.2	2	4.4	1
Valencia	40.1	16	32.5	12	12.6	5	10.3	4
Total	42.8	42	34.0	32	11.5	10	7.0	5

== Aftermath ==
=== Government formation ===
Investiture
Candidate	Ballot →	30 June 1995	
Candidate	Required majority →	45 out of 89	
Eduardo Zaplana (PP)	Yes: • PP (42); • UV (5)	47 / 89	check
Eduardo Zaplana (PP)	No: • PSOE (32); • EU–EV (10)	42 / 89	check
Eduardo Zaplana (PP)	Abstentions	0 / 89	check
Eduardo Zaplana (PP)	Absentees	0 / 89	check
Joan Lerma (PSOE)	Cancelled		
Albert Taberner (EU–EV)	Cancelled		

== Bibliography ==
- Ley Orgánica 5/1982, de 1 de julio, de Estatuto de Autonomía de la Comunidad Valenciana (Organic Law 1/1982). Official State Gazette (in Spanish). 1 July 1982 [version as of 25 March 1994]. BOE-A-1982-17235.
- Ley 5/1983, de 30 de diciembre, de Gobierno Valenciano (Law 5/1983). Official State Gazette (in Spanish). 30 December 1983 [version as of 7 April 1995]. BOE-A-1984-3460.
- Ley Orgánica 5/1985, de 19 de junio, del Régimen Electoral General (Organic Law 5/1985). Official State Gazette (in Spanish). 19 June 1985 [version as of 24 March 1995]. BOE-A-1985-11672.
- Ley 1/1987, de 31 de marzo, Electoral Valenciana (Law 1/1987). Official State Gazette (in Spanish). 31 March 1987 [version as of 6 April 1987]. BOE-A-1987-9636.
- Decreto 7/1995, de 3 de abril, del presidente de la Generalitat Valenciana, de disolución de las Cortes Valencianas y convocatoria de elecciones a las mismas (PDF) (Decree 7/1995). Official Journal of the Valencian Government (in Spanish). 3 April 1995.
- Corrección de errores del Decreto 7/1995, de 3 de abril, del presidente de la Generalitat Valenciana, de disolución de las Cortes Valencianas y convocatoria de elecciones a las mismas (DOGV n.º 2.483, de 4 de abril de 1995) (PDF) (Correction). Official Journal of the Valencian Government (in Spanish). 4 April 1995.
