= José María Chiquillo Barber =

Spanish politician (born 1964)

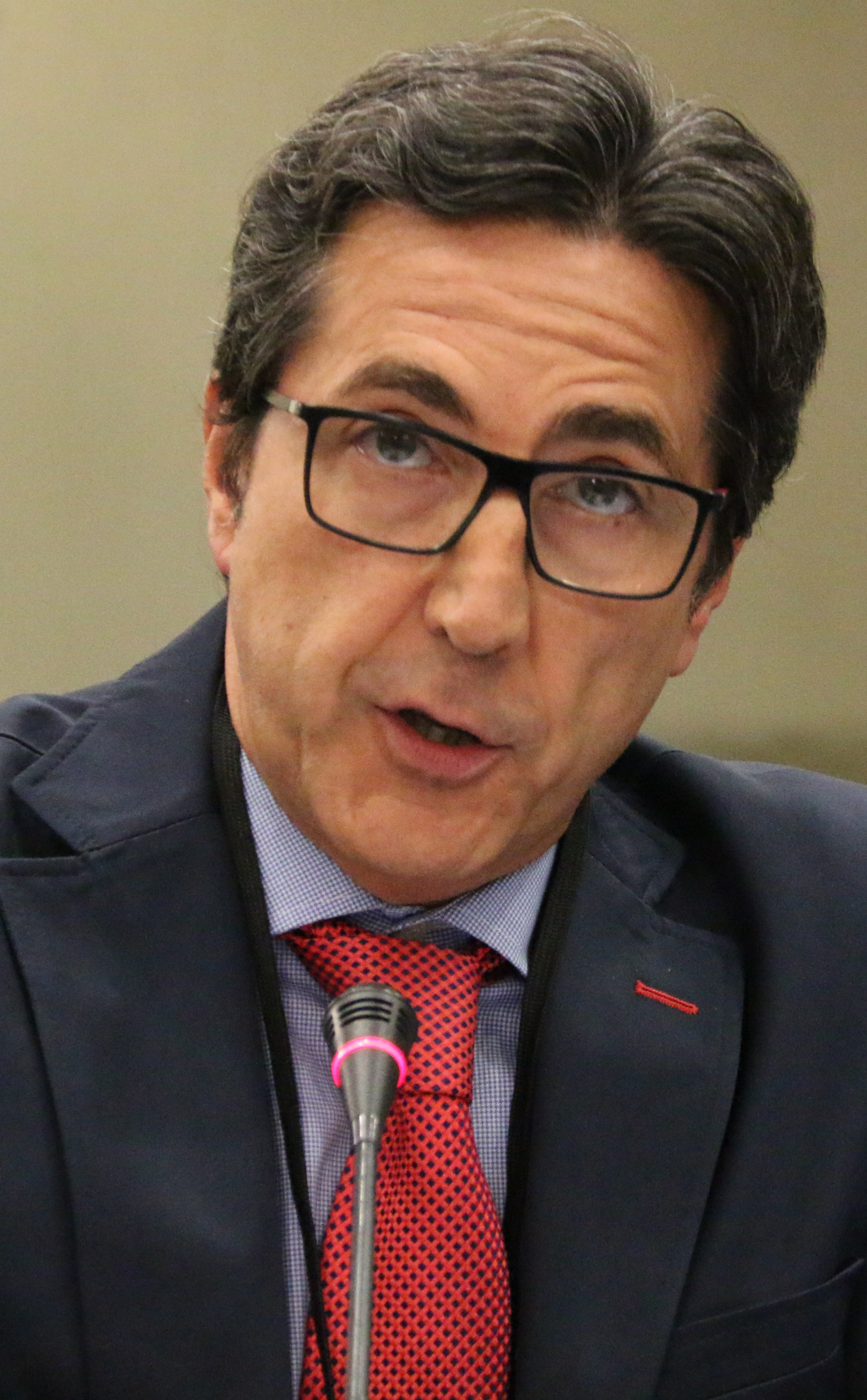
José María Chiquillo Barber in October 2016

José María Chiquillo Barber (Sumacàrcer, Spain, 24 November 1964) is a Spanish politician who has served as Senator for Valencia province as part of the People's Party (PP) since 2004.

Married with two children, Chiquillo worked as a lawyer and worked for Valencia city council from 1988 to 1989. In 1983 he joined Unió Valenciana (Valencian Union UV), a right wing regional party. He was second placed candidate on the party's list for the 1993 Spanish general election in Valencia province. As Unió Valenciana (UV) lost one of their two seats in that election he failed to be elected but, as first substitute for the party, replaced Vicente González Lizondo after the latter's death in 1994. He was re-elected in 1996 but lost his seat at the 2000 election. However for the 2004 general election, he formed an electoral pact with the PP, under which UV did not contest the election and Chiquillo was included in the PP list for the Spanish Senate as an independent, being elected to the Senate in March 2004. This proved controversial with the membership and led to a split in the party, with opponents accusing Chiquillo of having become "a puppet of the PP."

Chiquillo then resigned from UV and formed a new party in April 2005: Unió de Progrés per a la Comunitat Valenciana (Progress Union for the Valencian Community). This grouping subsequently became inactive and in March 2008 Chiquillo was elected to the Senate as a PP member. He has served as a PP spokesman in that body.
