= Ignacio Carrau =

Spanish politician, jurist and lawyer

Ignacio Carrau Leonarte (3 February 1923 – 12 December 2015) was a Spanish politician and lawyer. He served as Deputation President of the Province of Valencia between 1975 and 1979.

== Early life ==
Carrau was born on 3 February 1923 in Valencia. He came from a family of lawyers. His grandfather set up a law firm, where later his father and eventually he himself worked. His brother was killed during the Spanish Civil War. His grandfather served as Deputation President of Valencia as Ignacio would later do.

Carrau studied law at the University of Valencia and obtained a doctorate there as well.

== Political career ==
Carrau was elected as provincial deputy in 1974 as representative of the College of Lawyers (Spanish:Colegio de Abogados). The next year Deputation President Salvador Escandell became civil governor of Las Palmas and the Presidency was left vacant with a large number of volunteer candidates, Carrau not being one of them. While fishing on holiday in Bronchales, Carrau was picked up by a Deputation car, brought to civil governor Enrique Oltra Moltó, and was greeted as new President of the Deputation. He took office on 31 July 1975.

Carrau opposed the Spanish Constitution of 1978 because he felt it gave in too much to separatist movements. While in office he was a participant in the Battle of Valencia. In 1978 he also was one of the proposers of the Real Academia de Cultura Valenciana and a founder of the Unió Regional Valenciana.

Discontent with the situation of Spanish politics after the democratic transition he returned to his work as a lawyer. He left after the municipal elections of 1979.

== Personal life ==
A devout Catholic, Carrau was named Commander in the Order of St. Gregory the Great by Pope John Paul II in 2003. Valencia Archbishop Agustín García-Gasco Vicente had petitioned the Pope for the award.

Carrau was married and had six children. He died on 12 December 2015, aged 92.
