= Eduardo Zaplana =

Spanish politician

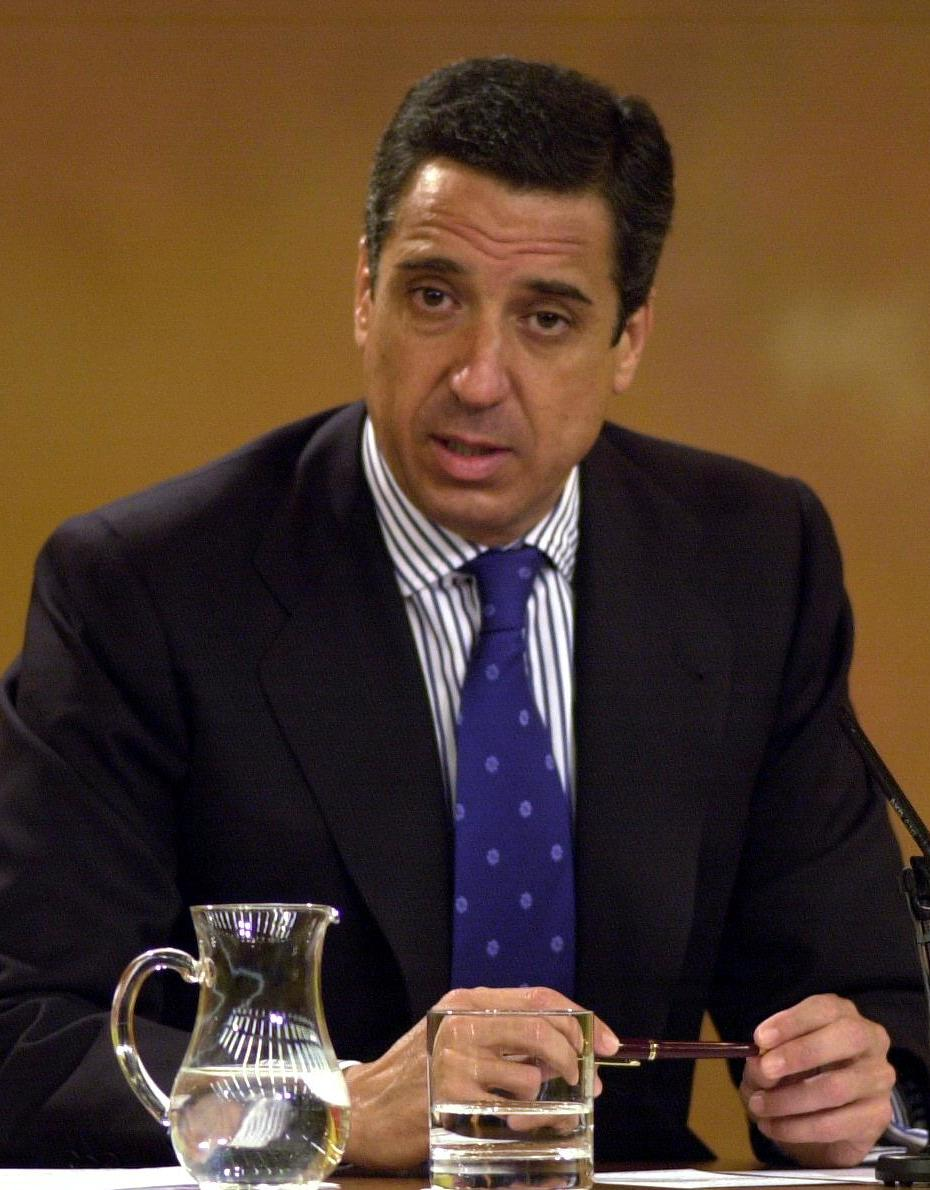
- Eduardo Zaplana, 2004

Minister of Labor and Social Issues
- In office 10 July 2002 – 18 April 2004
- President: José María Aznar
- Preceded by: Juan Carlos Aparicio
- Succeeded by: Jesús Caldera

President of the Valencian Government
- In office 3 July 1995 – 10 July 2002
- Vice President: José Luis Olivas
- Preceded by: Joan Lerma
- Succeeded by: José Luis Olivas

Member of the Congress of Deputies
- In office 14 March 2004 – 9 March 2008
- Constituency: Valencia
- In office 9 March 2008 – 30 April 2008
- Constituency: Madrid

Personal details
- Born: Eduardo Andrés Julio Zaplana Hernández-Soro; 3 April 1956 (age 70) Cartagena, Murcia, Spain
- Party: People's Party
- Other political affiliations: Union of the Democratic Centre
- Spouse: Rosa Barceló
- Children: 3

Eduardo Andrés Julio Zaplana Hernández-Soro (born 3 April 1956) is a Spanish politician who served as Minister of Labour and Social Issues from 2002 to 2004, President of the Valencian Government from 1995 to 2002 and Spokesperson of the Partido Popular (PP) in the Spanish Congress of Deputies from 2004 to 2008.

== Biography ==
A lawyer, Zaplana studied at the University of Alicante. After involvement in the now defunct Union of the Democratic Centre (UCD), Zaplana joined PP. He served as mayor of Benidorm from 1991 to 1994; he also served in the Valencian Regional Parliament as a deputy, becoming president of the Valencian Community in 1995, a position he held until 24 July 2002. He resigned after being appointed Minister of Employment and Social Security, a post he held until the 2004 General Election.

He served as a senator from 2002 until 2004, when he was elected to the Spanish Congress, representing Valencia and becoming PP's main spokesman in Congress.

For 2008, he changed electoral districts, moving to Madrid, where he was fourth on the PP list. Following PP's election defeat in March 2008, he resigned as PP Spokesman, stating that he intended to become a backbench MP. On 29 April, he resigned as PP MP altogether, announcing that he would become a European delegate for Telefónica.

In 2017, the media reported some of his opinions about Spanish conservative leaders.

In May 2018, Eduardo Zaplana was arrested for money laundering and bribery. The general coordinator of PP, Fernando Martínez-Maíllo, announced that party will suspend Zaplana's party membership.

== Personal life ==
He is married with three children.

Political offices
Preceded by Manuel Catalán	Mayor of Benidorm; 1991-1994	Succeeded by Vicente Pérez Devesa
Preceded by Joan Lerma	President of the Valencian Government; 1995–2002	Succeeded by José Luis Olivas
Preceded by Juan Carlos Aparicio	Minister of Labor and Social Issues; 2002-2004	Succeeded by Jesús Caldera
Party political offices
Preceded by Pedro Agramunt	President of the People's Party in Valencia; 1993–2004	Succeeded by Francisco Camps
Preceded by Luis de Grandes	Chairman of the Popular Group in the Congress of Deputies; 2004–2008	Succeeded by Soraya Sáenz de Santamaría
