= José Luis Olivas =

Spanish politician (1952–2025)

The Right Honourable José Luis Olivas

President of the Valencian Government
- In office 24 July 2002 – 20 June 2003
- Monarch: Juan Carlos I
- Preceded by: Eduardo Zaplana
- Succeeded by: Francisco Camps

Personal details
- Born: 13 October 1952 Motilla del Palancar, Spain
- Died: 29 November 2025 (aged 73)
- Party: PPCV
- Education: Complutense University of Madrid

José Luis Olivas Martínez (13 October 1952 – 29 November 2025) was a Spanish politician of the People's Party. He was named the third president of the Valencian Government (the first not to have been chosen in elections) when Eduardo Zaplana was named Minister of Labor in 2002. A year later, he was replaced by Francisco Camps, who took over the party's leadership in the Valencian Community. Olivas decided then to pursue a business career. In 2003, he was appointed president of Banco de Valencia, in 2004 he was president of Bancaja; and in 2010 vice president of Bankia (a bank created by the merger of Caja Madrid, Bancaja and others).

Banco de Valencia went bankrupt in October 2011, and the State took control. Olivas resigned. In December 2011, Bankia declared enormous losses, and the government nationalized the entity and imposed a new direction. In May 2012, he resigned as president of Bancaja.

On 29 June 2015, the Unidad Central Operativa, the serious crime division of Spain's Guardia Civil, arrested Olivas on charges of embezzlement and fraud.

Olivas died after a long illness on 29 November 2025, at the age of 73.
