= Miguel Ramón Izquierdo =

Spanish politician

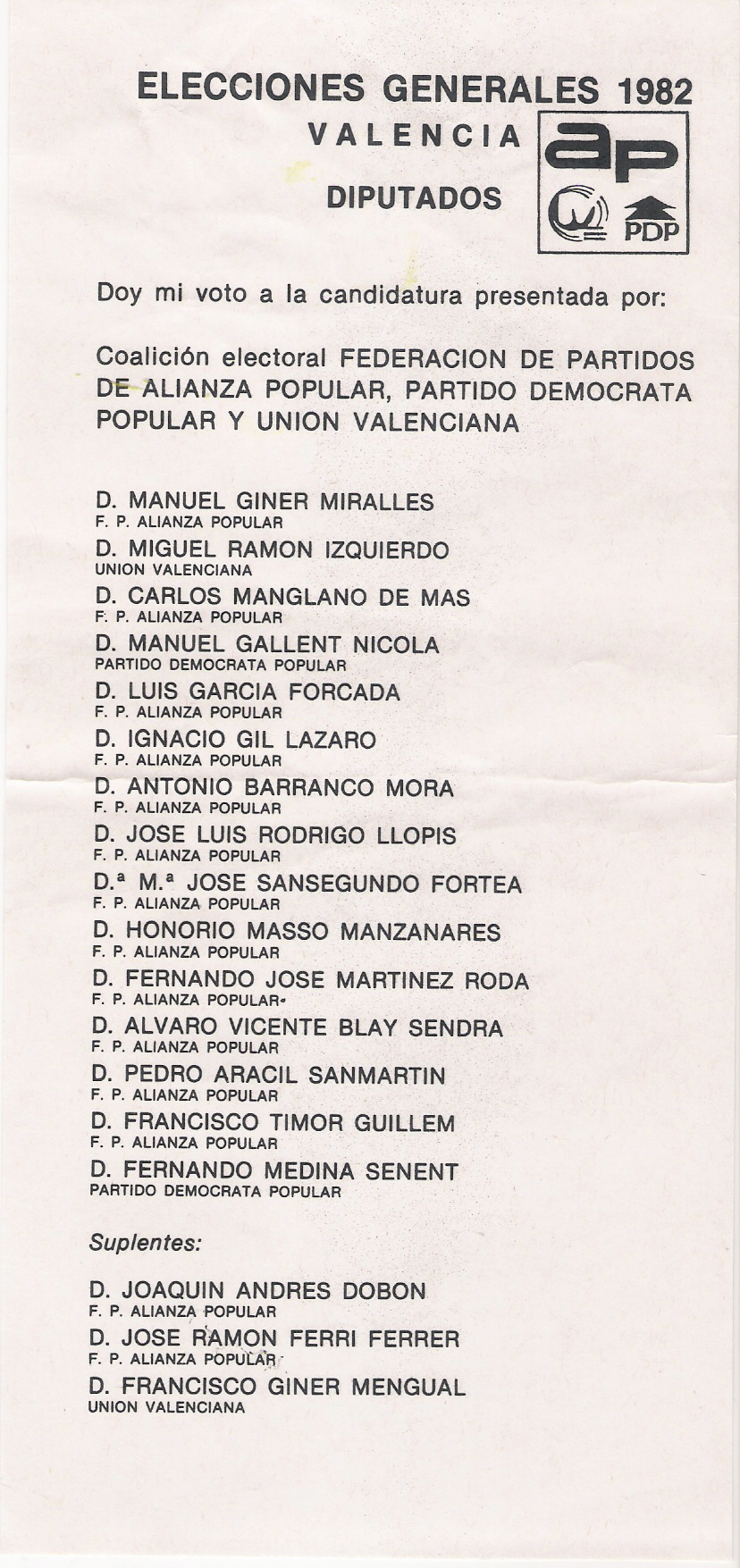
Ballot for the 1982 general elections, from the AP PDP UV coalition for the province of Valencia to Congress

Miguel Ramón Izquierdo (8 December 1919 – 17 September 2007) was a Spanish politician who served as the last mayor of Valencia in the Franco era and the first in the modern democratic era.

== Biography ==
=== Early career and mayoral term ===
Izquierdo was born in Valencia.

Married with six children, Ramón worked as a lawyer. In the Franco era he served as provincial president of the metal syndicate from 1963 to 1966. He served as procurator for Valencia province in the Francoist Cortes Españolas from 1973 until its dissolution in 1977. He was appointed Mayor of Valencia in September 1973 and served until April 1979. In June 1977, when the first democratic government was formed, he resigned the office considering that he was no longer authorised to head it, but was persuaded to resume the role within a month. Nonetheless, he insisted on being ratified by a vote of Valencian councillors.

During his time as Mayor he aimed to professionalise the city and run it "like a business." He also acted to halt residential development in the Devesa del Saler natural park and secured the transfer of the gardens in the old course of the River Turia from the Spanish Crown to Valencia City council. He later recalled that he had ensured that when the King came to Valencia "He came with the River under his arm." He also restored the teaching of the Valencian language in schools in Valencia city.

=== Democratic era ===
Politically and socially Francoist, he resisted the replacement of the ailing Franco by the young King Juan Carlos but nevertheless welcomed the new monarch on his first visit to Valencia city. He abstained in the vote to legalise political parties in June 1976. After the law was passed, he joined the new Spanish People's Union (Unión del pueblo español), however, one year later, in 1977, he became a founder member of the Valencian Regional Union (Unión Regional Valenciana), the embryo of the Valencian Union (Unió Valenciana) which was formed in August 1982. He became Secretary General of Unió Valenciana (UV) in September 1982 and later served as its regional president.

=== National politician ===
He entered national politics in 1982 when he was elected to the national parliament as a deputy for Valencia province as part of a joint list between UV and the Popular Alliance. In 1986, when UV contested the election in their own right, he was re-elected, serving until 1989.

He then resumed his legal career continuing until late in life, although he was plagued by heart problems in later years." His final public appearance was in December 2006 at a public ceremony to commemorate the transfer of the river gardens to the Valencian local council."
