= Battle of Valencia (cultural) =

The Battle of Valencia was an identity conflict held in the Valencian society during the Spanish transition to democracy. It involved the progressive valencianism known as Fusterianism (named that way after intellectual Joan Fuster i Ortells) and the conservative anticatalanist regionalism known as blaverism.

== Valencianist positions ==
The positions associated with Valencianism have varied somewhat since the return to democracy, depending on the direction of the supposed "threat". Some Valencianists positions have become mainstream (e.g., the flag), some have lost their association with Valencianism (e.g., role of the autonomous institutions) while some have become more associated with valencianism, and more hotly debated (e.g., the Valencian language).

=== Flag of the autonomous community ===
The question of which flag should be used to represent the Valencian Community is at the origin of the name "Valencianism", which is derived from the Valencian "blava", meaning "blue". The origin of the dispute can be traced to Fuster's "Nosaltres els valencians", where he claims that Valencians and Catalans have always shared the same flag (the Senyera) and that Valencian groups who had used different flags in the years before Franco "knew not what they did" (no sabien el que es feien, p. 26). The Senyera in its simplest form—sometimes referred to as the quatribarrada—gained a certain (but not overwhelming) support in Valencianist circles, and was on view at the march in favour of autonomy of 9 October 1977.

The Statute of Morella proposed that the flag of the autonomous community be the Senyera with the royal coat of arms at the centre (those of Peter III of Aragon (1336–87), who did much to formalize the autonomy of the Kingdom of Valencia within the Crown of Aragon). This was adopted as the flag of the Consell del País Valencià on 24 April 1979: however the decision was seen as a provocation by the UCD, coming as it did after elections which would have given the centre-right a majority on the Consell but before the new Consell could be constituted.

The more Valencianist groups seized the opportunity provided by the tense political climate: the flags of the Valencia Town Hall were burnt by demonstrators on 9 October 1979, far from the only act of political violence that year.

The socialist representative left the Consell on 22 December 1979 and the choice of flag was reversed on 14 January 1980. The Valencianists continued to insist that the flag of the new autonomous community be recognisably different from that of any other, and particularly that of Catalonia (the Senyera in its simplest form). The Statute of Benicàssim proposed a new design, but the UCD representative on the Constitutional Committee of the Congress of Deputies managed to impose an amendment making the flag of the autonomous community the same as that of the city of Valencia (for, 17; against, 16; abstention, 1) which includes the blue fringe (the Senyera Coronada).

Since the adoption of the first Statute of Autonomy, the issue has lost much of its controversy. The use of the Senyera coronada has a wide acceptance within the Valencian Community, although some small groups on the left of the political spectrum (e.g. Els Verds, ERPV) continue to refer to it as the "blavera" and the Senyera quatribarrada can be seen from time to time, particularly in the districts furthest from the capital.

=== Name of the autonomous community ===
The question of the name of the autonomous community was initially seen as fairly minor compared to the debates over the flag and the powers which would be granted to the Generalitat Valenciana. However it became the issue which almost caused the rejection of the Statute of Autonomy by the Congress of Deputies in 1982.

At the start of the democratic transition Valencian: País Valencià, Spanish: Pais Valenciano (roughly translated as "Valencian Country") seemed to enjoy a wide consensus. It was under this name that the Consell del País Valencià was established, and it was this name which was used in the Call for Autonomy of 8 October 1978, signed by both the UCD and by the postfranquists of the Alianza Popular.

The blaverist view, minority even on the right at first, was that the term País Valencià implied an identification with the Països Catalans, an anathema to the valencianists. In the context of the political tensions of 1979–80, they called ever more loudly for the alternative name Regne de València ("Kingdom of Valencia").
