= Valencian Union =

Defunct regionalist political party in Spain

Valencian Union Unió Valenciana
- Leader: Jose Manuel Miralles
- Founded: August 1982
- Dissolved: 2014
- Headquarters: C/ Maluquer, 1, 2 Valencia
- Ideology: Blaverism; Valencian regionalism Conservatism; Federalism; Anti-Catalanism
- Political position: Right-wing
- Colours: Blue, Orange

Website
- www.uniovalenciana.org

Valencian Union (Valencian: Unió Valenciana; Spanish: Unión Valenciana; UV) was a regionalist political party in the Valencian Community, Spain.

The party had not been represented in the Valencian autonomous parliament since 1999. It scored 0.95% of the total votes in the 2007 elections, well below the 5% threshold for representation. The party had councillors on several local councils, obtaining its best results in the Valencia province.

The party was closely associated with the blaverist part of Valencianist movement by claiming that the Valencian language is different from the Catalan language and opposing the concept of Països Catalans and Catalan nationalism in the Valencian Community. The party also held right-wing stances on issues such as economics. It formed an electoral alliance with the larger right wing Partido Popular (PP) in the General elections of 1982 and 2004, and the Elections for the Autonomous Parliament in 1983.

== History ==
=== Early years and prime (1982–1991) ===
It was formed on 30 August 1982 with the stated purpose of "defending Valencian identity" and ran for the first time in the Spanish general election, 1982. It participated as part of the larger Spain-wide right-wing block Alianza Popular and won a seat held by Miguel Ramón Izquierdo. This coalition was kept for the 1983 elections to the Valencian autonomous Parliament.

UV took part by itself in the 1986 general election. Miguel Ramón Izquierdo retained his seat in the Cortes Generales. In 1987, it entered the Corts Valencianes (Valencian regional parliament), winning six of the 89 seats in the parliament. It then doubled its presence at the Cortes Generales when two of its candidates won in the 1989 general election. One of the seats was won by its founder, Vicente González Lizondo.

UV reached its height in the Valencian regional elections of 1991, when it became the third largest party in the Valencian Community, overtaking the traditional third party in the territory (Esquerra Unida del País Valencià). This election elevated UV to its all-time record, 10.5% of the total votes, with this figure remarkably higher in its electoral stronghold, the Valencian speaking areas in the Valencia province.

=== Death of González Lizondo and decline (1995–2008) ===
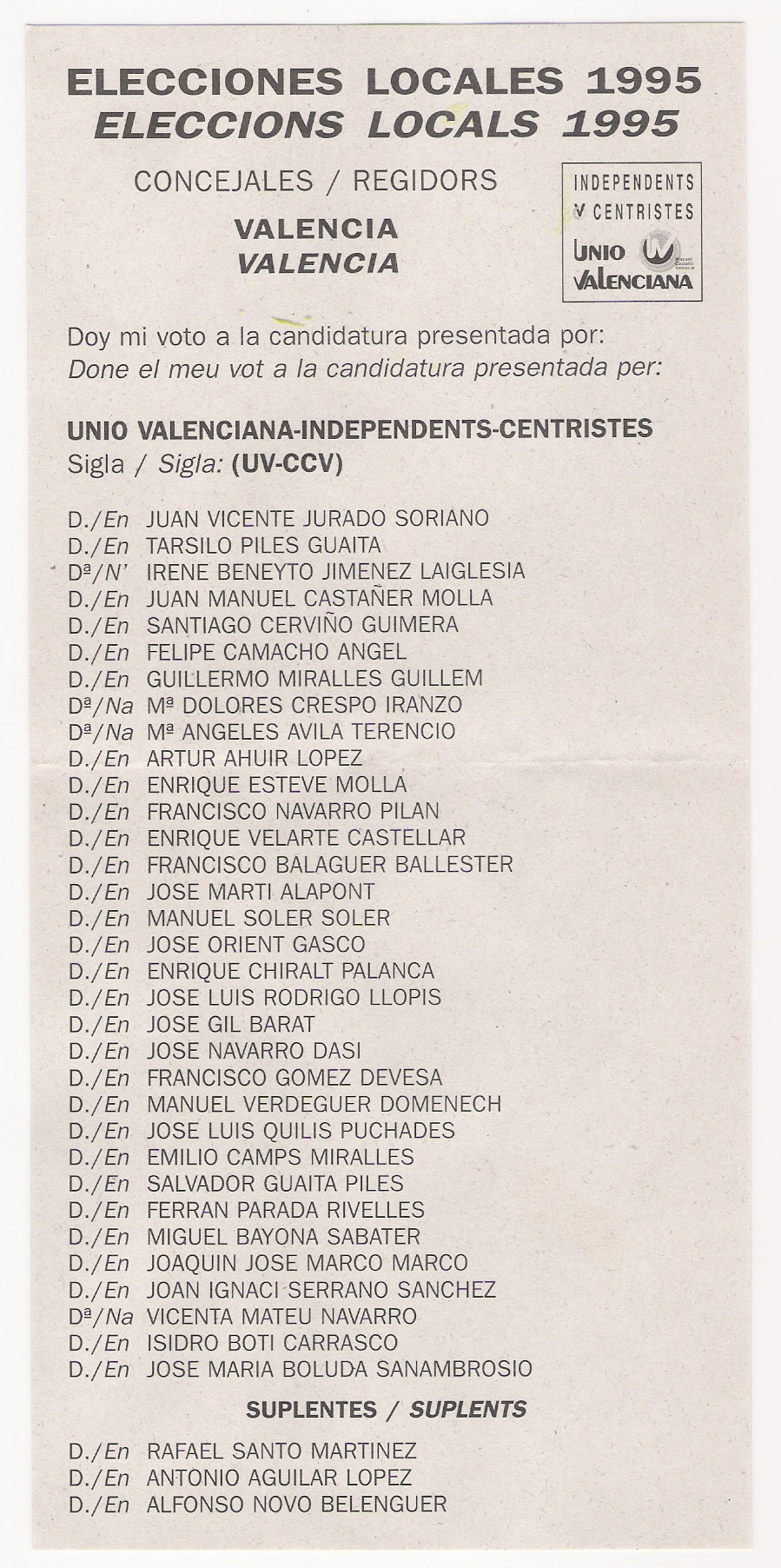
UV ballot paper.

The turning point of UV's history took place in the regional elections of 1995. At those elections, UV achieved 7.1% of the total votes and fell back to fourth place among the parties with representation in the Corts Valencianes. But, despite having had remarkably worse results than those of their high point in 1991, UV gained an unprecedented influence at the center of the Valencian political scene, because the results of this election deprived the Spanish Socialist Workers' Party (PSOE) of an absolute majority. The new situation allowed both opposition parties, the Partido Popular (PP), which was short of a majority, and UV to agree on a coalition government to oust the PSOE from regional rule after the latter had served 12 consecutive years in office.

From 1995 through to the next regional elections in 1999, a rising PP manoeuvered to ideologically absorb its smaller government partner UV. At the same time, the party received a fatal blow when leader Vicente González Lizondo died in 1997 after suffering a heart attack while on duty at the Corts. With UV being primarily based on a reactive idea such as blaverism rather than on a consistent ideological set of policies, the loss of its founder and leader was a setback from which it has not recovered.

Also during these years, a number of medium and prominent UV ranks defected from the party and joined the PP.

Then, in 1999 – at the first elections after UV's support had been crucial in forming a government – the party suffered a serious blow when its vote share of 4.76% (down from 7.1%) was just short of the 5% threshold necessary to win seats at the Corts. In those elections, the PP, which had received the lion's share of former UV votes, achieved an absolute majority in the Corts, thus completing its electoral strategy for hegemony in the Valencian Community.

UV's vote share further declined in the 2003 and 2007 regional elections. For the 2004 general election, the party revived its electoral pact with the Partido Popular and obtained a seat in the Spanish Senate held by José María Chiquillo.

Simultaneously, UV was plagued by a number of schisms of small groups of members who left to form their own parties such as Opció Nacionalista Valenciana, Unió de Progrés per la Comunitat Valenciana, Iniciativa de Progrés per la Comunitat Valenciana, Identidad del Reino de Valencia, Renovació Valencianista or Partido Regional de la Comunidad Valenciana. Some of these, given their very small numbers, have either been readmitted in UV or, alternatively, have joined the PP. The rest went on to form Coalició Valenciana, a party assuming the staunch rightwing image which UV has tried to depart from during the 2000s. Coalició Valenciana reached 0.72% of the total votes at the 2007 regional elections, well below the 5% threshold to enter the regional parliament, but a narrow gap when compared to UV's own 0.95%.

Following acrimonious internal elections, Chiquillo quit the party and went on to join the PP, thus generating a severe internal crisis which weakened the party still further. Joaquín Ballester Sanz, a councillor for the town of Paterna succeeded Chiquillo as the Party leader. At the end of April 2006, Ballester Sanz resigned and in the leadership election in May the mayor of Náquera, José Manuel Miralles became the new leader.

At the 2007 elections to the Corts Valencianes, UV achieved 0.95% of the total votes. The party announced that it would not run –neither by itself, nor repeating an electoral pact with the PP– for the 2008 general election. This decision was dubbed by its proponents as "hard, but necessary for UVs survival as a political party"; the party also said at that time that it was conducting an internal restructuring with the aim of being in better shape for the 2011 regional election.

=== 2011 and possible merger with PP ===
In 2011, the party announced that it would not contest either the regional or local elections due to a lack of funds and activists. This was the first time since its foundation that UV had not taken part in local or regional elections. On 10 April 2011, party leader Miralles and Valencian President Francisco Camps appeared together and announced the merger of the projects of UV and the PP, with Miralles urging UV supporters to vote for the PP in the May elections. In response, UV's Secretary General, Luís Melero announced that he would attempt to expel Miralles from the party to prevent it from being absorbed by the PP. Other members and supporters of UV decided to stand in the lists of other parties, mainly Units per València, which absorbed the UV branches of Carcaixent, Torrent and others, while Melero himself stood as part of the Units list in Silla.

The party made a late attempt to contest the 2011 Spanish General Election but failed to secure the 0.1% of signatures necessary to appear on the ballot paper.

== Election results ==
=== Cortes Generales ===
Cortes Generales
Election	Congress					Senate		Status in legislature
Election	Vote	%	Score	Seats	+/–	Seats	+/–	Status in legislature
1986	64,403	0.32%	15th	1 / 350	1	0 / 208	0	Opposition
1989	144,924	0.71%	11th	2 / 350	1	0 / 208	0	Opposition
1993	112,341	0.48%	14th	1 / 350	1	0 / 208	0	Opposition
1996	91,575	0.37%	12th	1 / 350	0	0 / 208	0	Confidence and supply
2000	57,830	0.25%	16th	0 / 350	1	0 / 208	0	Extra-parliamentary

=== Corts Valencianes ===
Corts Valencianes
Election	Votes	%	Seats	+/–	Leading candidate	Government
1983	Within CP		5 / 89	—	Manuel Giner	Opposition
1987	183,541	9.14 (#4)	6 / 89	1	Filibert Crespo	Opposition
1991	208,126	10.36 (#3)	7 / 89	1	Héctor Villalba	Opposition
1995	165,956	7.01 (#4)	5 / 89	2	Vicente González Lizondo	Coalition
1999	106,119	4.68 (#4)	0 / 89	5	Héctor Villalba	No seats
2003	72,557	2.98 (#5)	0 / 89	0	Valero Eustaquio	No seats
2007	22,789	0.94 (#4)	0 / 99	0	José Manuel Miralles	No seats
