= Pedro Agramunt =

Spanish politician (1951–2024)

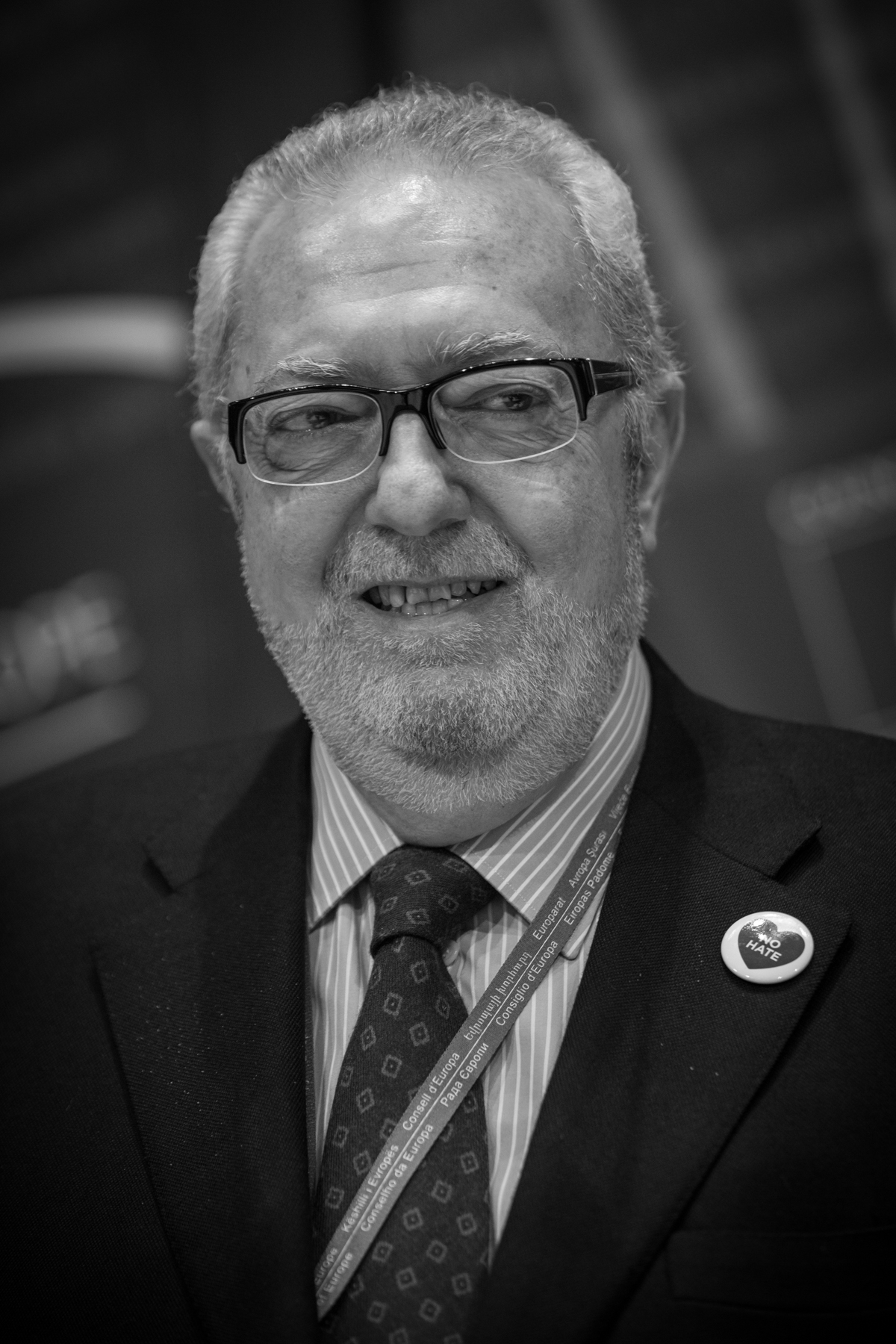
Pedro Agramunt (2016)

Pedro Agramunt Font de Mora (12 September 1951 – 25 November 2024) was a Spanish politician. Agramunt was from Valencia and served as a member of the Senate of Spain since 2008. He had previously represented Valencia Province in the Spanish Congress of Deputies from 1989 to 1991 and in the Corts Valencianes, the Valencian regional parliament, from 1991 to 1994. He was a prominent member of the People's Party (Spain). He was also a Chairman of the European People's Party since January 2016 and was active in the Parliamentary Assembly of the Council of Europe, being president until his resignation on 6 October 2017.

Agramunt advocated for further European integration and spoke in favour of supporting Ukraine.

== Background ==
According to his official biography, Agramunt held a degree in law from the University of Valencia. Agramunt's biography also says that he graduated from the Instituto de Estudios Superiores de la Empresa (IESE) in Barcelona, having studied Management Development (1980).

Agramunt was married in 1979 and had two children. He died on 25 November 2024, in Valencia, at the age of 73.

== Controversy ==
Although Agramunt had a low profile in non-Spanish media, he was the focus of significant controversy, as he was the rapporteur of the Parliamentary Assembly of the Council of Europe on political prisoners in Azerbaijan. Human rights activists had criticized Agramunt for his proximity to the regime in Azerbaijan, and have highlighted that he did little to highlight numerous violations of human rights. Leyla Yunus, one of the Azerbaijani human rights activists that had criticized Agramunt in June 2014, has since been arrested, on charges that Human Rights Watch characterized as "bogus".

In 2013, the European Stability Initiative pressed for Agramunt to resign from his position as rapporteur, alleging that he had covered up systematic violations of human rights in Azerbaijan. In 2017 in the report entitled "The Azerbaijani Laundromat" published by the Organized Crime and Corruption Reporting Project as result of investigative journalism, Agramunt was mentioned to be benefiting from Azerbaijani scheme of money laundering. Furthermore, he played a key role in rigging various votes at PACE in favour of Azerbaijan.

On 28 April 2017, after travelling to Syria to meet Bashar al-Assad, the Bureau of PACE said he was no longer authorized to undertake any official visits, attend meetings, or make public statements on behalf of the assembly in his capacity as president after a vote of no confidence on him. His partiality as a President of PACE was proven and he eventually resigned as the President of Parliamentary Assembly of the Council of Europe on 6 October 2017.
