= Joan Lerma =

Spanish politician (born 1951)

The Right Honourable Joan Lerma
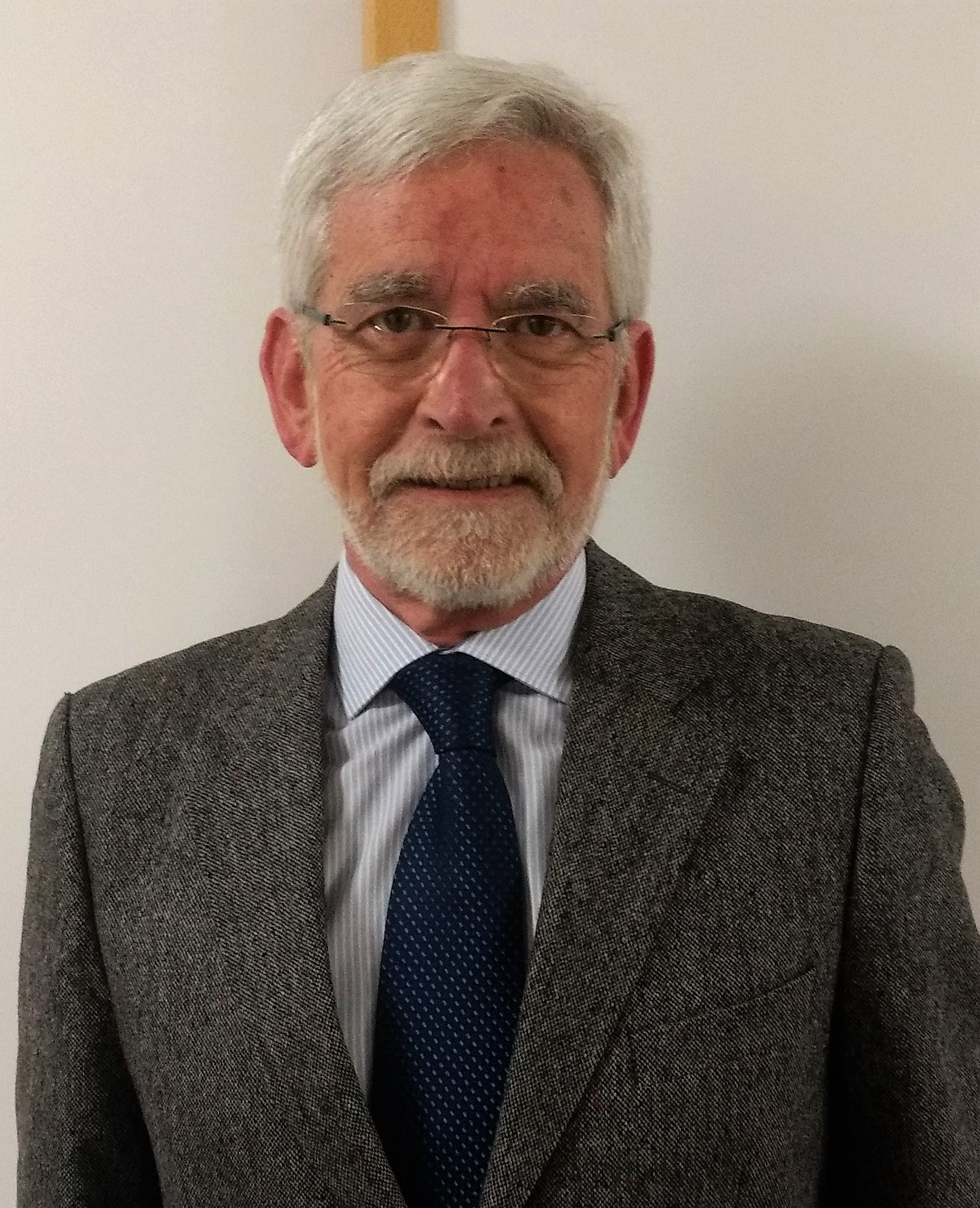

President of the Valencian Government
- In office 12 August 1982 – 3 July 1995
- Monarch: Juan Carlos I
- Preceded by: Enrique Monsonís
- Succeeded by: Eduardo Zaplana

Personal details
- Born: 15 July 1951 (age 75) Valencia, Spain
- Party: PSOE
- Education: University of Valencia

Joan Lerma Blasco (born 15 July 1951 in Valencia, Spain) is a Spanish politician for the Spanish Socialist Workers' Party (PSOE), who served as the first democratically elected President of the Valencian Government since the restoration of democracy in the 1970s.

== Early life ==
Lerma gained a degree in Economic and Business Science from the University of Valencia in 1976. He was a young Trotskyist and in 1973, practised entryism by joining the Young Socialists (Spanish: Juventudes Socialistes). In 1974 he joined the Unión General de Trabajadores (UGT), a major trade union historically affiliated with the PSOE, becoming a PSOE member in 1975. at which point the party was still illegal under the Francoist State.

He served as employment minister in the administration of the Valencian Community from April 1978 until June 1979. In July 1978, when the Socialist Party of the Valencian Country (PSPV) decided to merge with the PSOE, Lerma was elected Secretary for political relations between the two groupings and a year later became Secretary General of the combined PSPV-PSOE, the regional branch of the PSOE in the Valencian Community. He headed the regional PSPV-PSOE list at the 1979 General Election and was elected to the Spanish Congress of Deputies representing Valencia Province and was re-elected in the subsequent elections in 1982.

== President of the Valencian Community ==
On 26 November 1982, Lerma was appointed President of the Valencian Community after the resignation of Enrique Monsonís. This was the last occasion to date that a president was appointed, as future president and would be chosen by the Corts Valencianes, the Valencian regional parliament.

In 1983, the PSOE won the first elections for the Corts Valencianes since the death of Franco with an absolute majority and the parliament in turn selected Lerma as the first elected President of the Valencian Community since the restoration of democracy in the 1970s.

=== First administration ===
Lerma announced that the priorities of his first administration would be administrative reform, political and economic recovery and health and education. One controversial issue was the proposed layoffs at the 'Altos Hornos del Mediterraneo' steelworks which led to strikes by local Trade Unions.

== Later career ==
The PSOE won the subsequent elections in the Valencian Community in 1987 and 1991 and Lerma was re-elected President of the Valencian Community on both occasions. However the party lost the 1995 election to the Partido Popular. Lerma blamed his defeat on the policies of the Central Government, singling out delays affecting the construction of motorways through the Valencian territory and lack of support from the Central Government in disputes with the neighbouring community of Castile-La Mancha over the Central Government's National Hydrologic Plan as reasons for his defeat. Following his defeat, Lerma resigned from the Valencian Parliament. Although he had stated that he would only accept a Central Government post in "an emergency situation through a sense of duty", he was appointed Minister for Public Administration by the Prime Minister Felipe Gonzalez.

=== Senator ===
Lerma returned to the Spanish Congress in 1996 when he was elected to the Spanish Senate, office he is holding as of August 2019. He served as PSOE spokesman in the Senate from 2004 to 2008.

Political offices
Preceded by Enrique Monsonís	President of the Valencian Government; 1982-1995	Succeeded by Eduardo Zaplana
Preceded by Jerónimo Saavedra	Minister for Public Administration of Spain; 1995-1996	Succeeded by Mariano Rajoy
Party political offices
Preceded by Joan Pastor	Secretary-General of the Socialist Party of the Valencian Country; 1977-1997	Succeeded by Joan Romero
Preceded by Juan José Laborda	Leader of the Socialist Group en the Senate; 2004-2008	Succeeded by María Silva Rego
