= José Luis Ábalos =

Spanish politician (born 1959)

The Most Excellent José Luis Ábalos
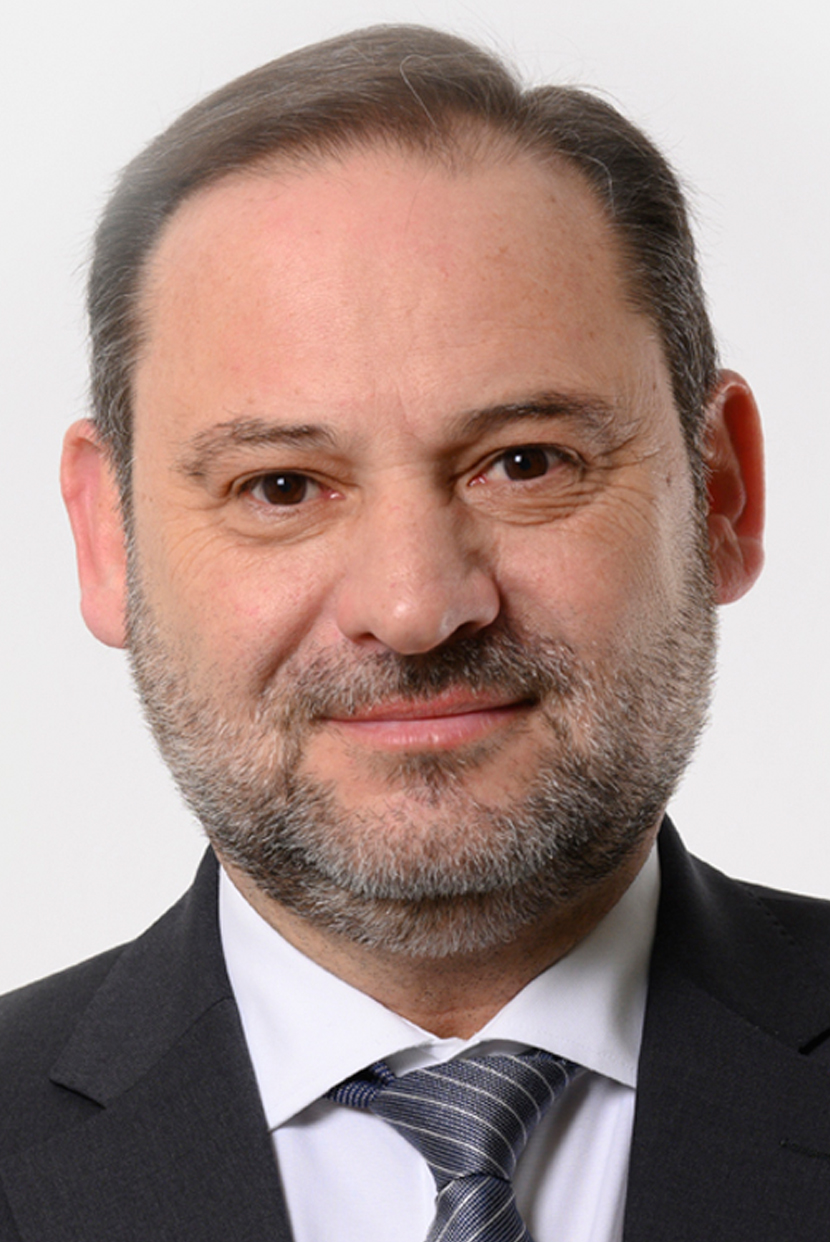
- Ábalos in 2020

Minister of Transport, Mobility and Urban Agenda
- In office 7 June 2018 – 14 July 2021
- Monarch: Felipe VI
- Prime Minister: Pedro Sánchez
- Preceded by: Iñigo de la Serna
- Succeeded by: Raquel Sánchez

Member of the Congress of Deputies
- In office 21 May 2019 – 28 January 2026
- Constituency: Valencia
- In office 21 April 2009 – 15 June 2018
- Constituency: Valencia

Personal details
- Born: 9 December 1959 (age 66) Torrent, Valencia, Spain
- Party: Independent (since 2024)
- Other party: Spanish Socialist Workers' Party (1981–2024); Communist Party of Spain (1978–1981); Communist Youth Union of Spain (1976–1978)
- Profession: Primary teacher, Politician

José Luis Ábalos Meco (born 9 December 1959) is a Spanish politician who served as Minister of Development (of Transport, Mobility and Urban Agenda since 2020) from 2018 to 2021, in the cabinets chaired by Pedro Sánchez. He also served as member of the Congress of Deputies from 2009 to 2026.

A long-time member of the Spanish Socialist Workers' Party (PSOE), Ábalos was expelled from the party in 2024 for his involvement in a corruption scandal (the Koldo case) during his time as minister. He was also the Secretary of Organization of his party from 2017 to 2021. On 27 November 2025, he entered prison to serve the preventive detention ordered by the Supreme Court of Spain in a ruling issued in the context of the criminal investigations to which he is subject.. The preventive detention was converted into a definite prision term to be served form 24 years and 9 months by the Supreme Court of Spain on June 22 2026. He is the first serving congressman to be incarcerated since the Spanish transition to democracy.

== Biography ==
Ábalos was born in Torrent, Valencia in 1959. He is the son of bullfighter Heliodoro Ábalos "Carbonerito" and the grandson of a Civil Guard officer, Julián Meco, who died in active service because of pneumonia during the Revolution of 1934. He joined the Communist Youth Union of Spain at the age of 17 and in 1978 he officially joined the Communist Party of Spain (PCE). After leaving the PCE, Ábalos joined the PSOE in 1981.

Ábalos worked as a primary school teacher. Within the PSOE, he served as Secretary-General of the PSOE for the Valencia City North region (based around the district of Orriols) from 1988 to 1995 before he became PSOE Secretary-General for Valencia city in the latter year. He also stood as a candidate for Secretary-General of the PSOE in the Valencian Community in 2001 and 2008, but was unsuccessful on both occasions. He was a member of Valencia City Council from 1999 to 2009, while also being a member of the Provincial Deputation of Valencia for the 2003–2007 period.

For the 2008 Spanish general election, Ábalos was selected as a candidate for the PSOE, being placed eighth on the list for Valencia Province. With the PSOE (as in the 2004 Spanish general election) winning seven seats, Ábalos initially failed to be elected to the Spanish Congress. In April 2009, he joined the Congress as a substitute for Inmaculada Rodríguez-Piñero, who had been appointed Secretary-General for Infrastructures within the Ministry of Public Works.

On 24 May 2017, Ábalos was appointed acting spokesperson of the Socialist Group in Congress after the victory of Pedro Sánchez in the party's leadership election. He served as such until 19 June 2017, when Margarita Robles was appointed spokesperson, and Ábalos was appointed secretary of Organization of the PSOE.

=== Minister ===
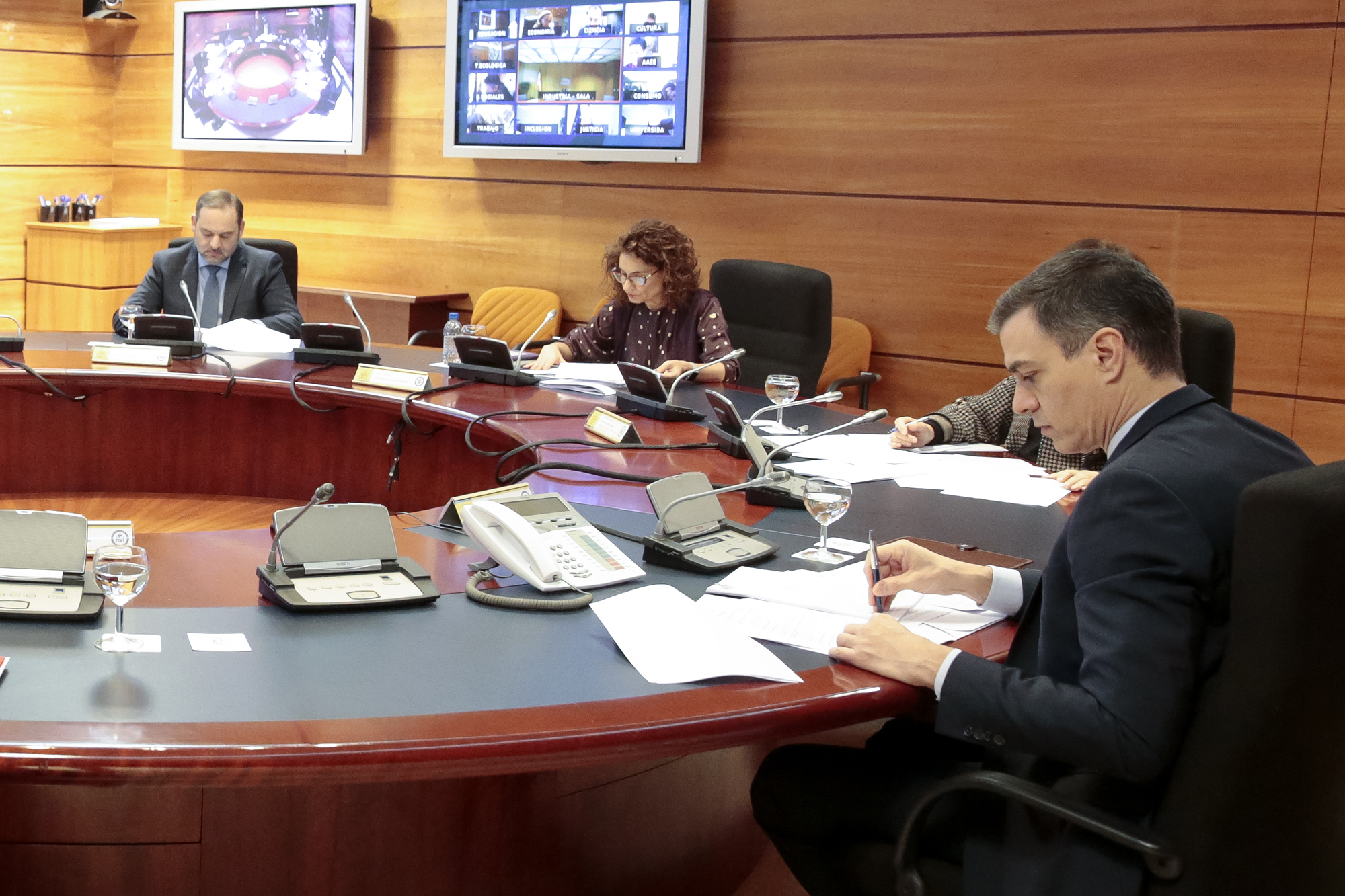
Ábalos, Finance Minister María Jesús Montero and Prime Minister Pedro Sánchez in March 2020

In June 2018, Prime Minister Sánchez appointed Ábalos as Minister of Development. Ábalos, along with ministers Robles and Batet were the only ministers in the first Cabinet of Pedro Sánchez who were also members of parliament. To avoid overlaps in their agendas, they resigned to its seats at the Congress of Deputies.

The Prime Minister called for snap elections twice in 2019, with the PSOE winning both of them. In both elections, Ábalos ran for election, being elected MP for the Valencia constituency. After the November 2019 Spanish general election, PSOE reached a deal with Unidas Podemos to form a coalition government presided by Sánchez, and Ábalos was confirmed on its position as Minister of Development, although the portfolio was renamed as Ministry of Transport, Mobility and Urban Agenda.

In January 2020, Ábalos met in the guest area of the Madrid–Barajas Airport with Delcy Rodríguez, Vice President of Venezuela, despite the entry ban imposed by the European Union. In July 2021, he was replaced by Raquel Sánchez Jiménez as minister of Transport. He also resigned as Secretary of Organization of PSOE. In September 2021, he became the president of the Interior Commission of Congress, and continued in this role after his re-election in the 2023 Spanish general election.

=== Koldo Case ===
On 20 February 2024, Ábalos' former advisor Koldo García Izaguirre and his wife were arrested by Central Operative Unit officers on suspicion of illegally taking commission on sales of masks during the COVID-19 pandemic. Facing overwhelming calls to resign, Ábalos quit as president of the Interior Commission, but refused to resign as a member of Congress and left the Socialist Parliamentary Group to form part of the Mixed Parliamentary Group. Seven days later, the PSOE suspended Ábalos' membership, which the latter condemned as he had not yet been indicted.

On 23 October, the Audiencia Nacional asked the Supreme Court to investigate Ábalos for his role in the Koldo Case. On 7 November 2024, the Supreme Court opened a case against Ábalos on suspicion of corruption, embezzlement, influence peddling and organised crime. On 27 November 2025, the Supreme Court judge decided that Ábalos and Koldo García should be sent to pre-trial detention without bail due to the "extreme risk" of flight. A few hours later, both were taken to Soto del Real prison.

Mid-2025 saw the emergence of leaked recordings in which Ábalos and his aide appeared to arrange meetings with sex workers. In response to the released recordings, the PSOE announced it would ban members from hiring sex workers.

== Positions held ==
- Secretary General of the Socialist Party of Valencia PSPV-PSOE (1995–2000)
- President of the National Committee of the PSPV-PSOE (1997–1999)
- Valencia city councillor (1999–2009)
- Vice-secretary General of PSPV-PSOE (2000–2004)
- Valencia regional assembly member (2003–2007)
- Member of the Congress of Deputies representing Valencia constituency (2009–2018; 2019–)
- Secretary General of PSPV in Valencia province (2012–2017)
- Acting Spokesperson of the Socialist Party at the Spanish Congress of Deputies (2017)
- Organizational Secretary of PSOE (2017–2021)
- Minister of Development (2018–2020); Minister of Transport, Mobility and Urban Agenda (2020–2021)

== Electoral history ==
José Luis Ábalos' electoral history
Election	List	Constituency	#	Result	Ref.
Valencia municipal election, 1999	PSOE	-	2nd (out of 33)	Elected	
Valencia municipal election, 2003	PSOE	-	2nd (out of 33)	Elected	
Valencia municipal election, 2007	PSOE	-	4th (out of 33)	Elected	
Spanish general election, 2008 (Congress of Deputies)	PSOE	Valencia	8th (out of 16)	Not elected	(Note: Ábalos was proclaimed deputy after the 2009 renouncement of Inmaculada Rodríguez-Piñero.)
Spanish general election, 2011 (Congress of Deputies)	PSOE	Valencia	3rd (out of 16)	Elected	
Spanish general election, 2015 (Congress of Deputies)	PSOE	Valencia	2nd (out of 15)	Elected	
Spanish general election, 2016 (Congress of Deputies)	PSOE	Valencia	2nd (out of 16)	Elected	
Spanish general election, April 2019 (Congress of Deputies)	PSOE	Valencia	1st (out of 15)	Elected	
Spanish general election, November 2019 (Congress of Deputies)	PSOE	Valencia	1st (out of 15)	Elected	

== Notes ==
Political offices
Preceded by Íñigo de la Serna	Minister of Development; 2018–present	Incumbent
Party political offices
Preceded by Antonio Hernando	Leader of the Socialist Group in the Congress of Deputies; Acting; 2017	Succeeded by Margarita Robles
Preceded by César Luena	Secretary of Organization of the Spanish Socialist Workers' Party; 2017-present	Incumbent
