= Koldo affair =

Corruption scandal in Spain

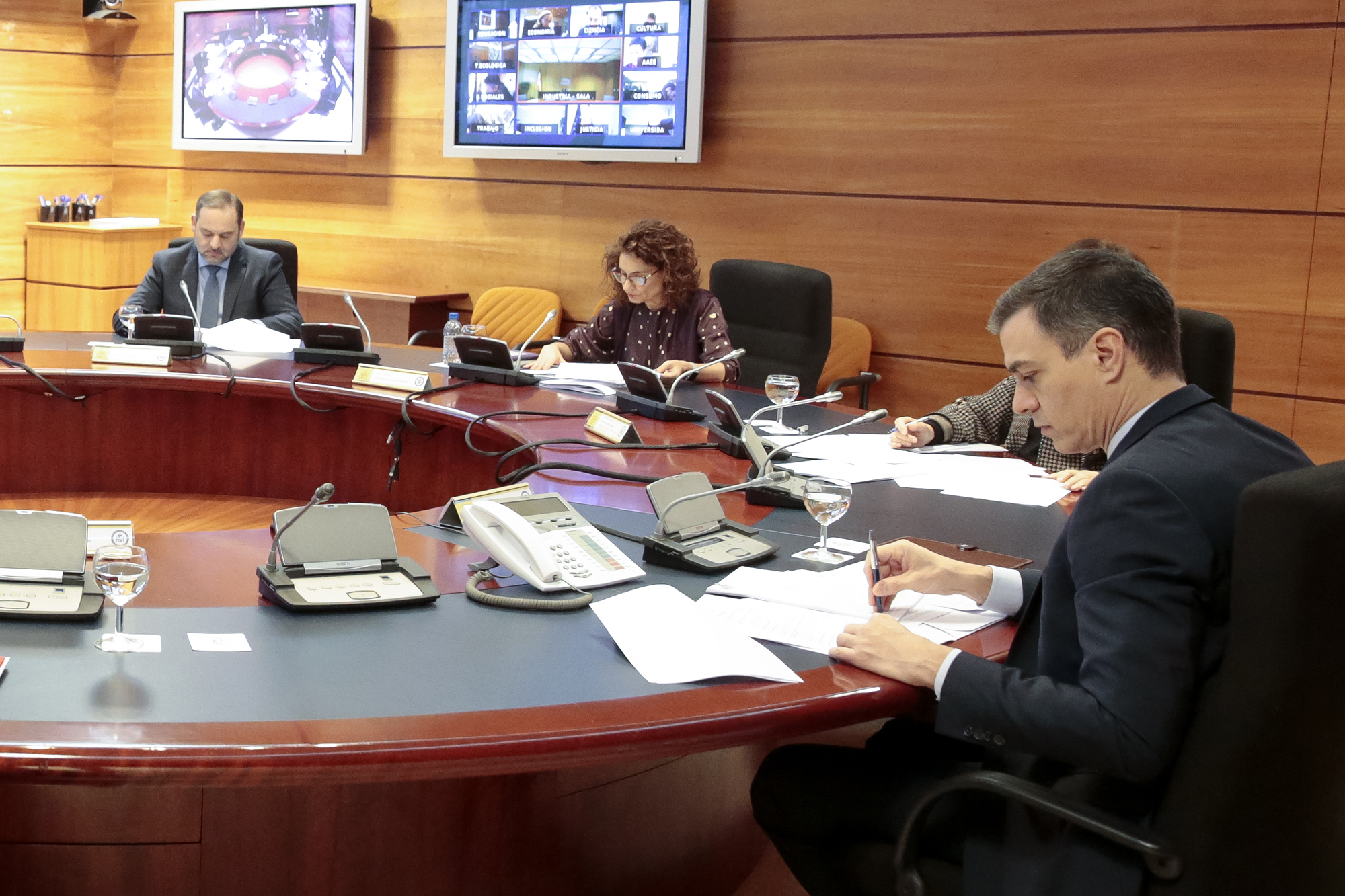
José Luis Ábalos (left), María Jesús Montero and Pedro Sánchez in March 2020

The Koldo affair (Spanish: Caso Koldo) or Ábalos affair (Caso Ábalos), is an ongoing corruption prosecution conducted by the Supreme Court of Spain that began on 28 February 2024. The case is centred around José Luis Ábalos (the former transport minister) and his former advisor Koldo García Izaguirre. The case involves several political figures, primarily close allies of Prime Minister Pedro Sánchez, and was originally sparked by questions over the purchase of masks during the COVID-19 pandemic.

Over time, the case started to be linked to a series of other scandals which had come about during Sánchez's second and third ministries, including the Delcygate scandal of 2020, in which the Venezuelan minister met with key government figures despite being under international sanctions; an ongoing case surrounding Sánchez's wife Begoña Gómez; and a series of affairs by Ábalos that involved close relations being employed in government despite having little experience and receiving large benefits.

== Background ==
Spain was one of the countries most seriously affected by the COVID-19 pandemic, which had a significant impact on the economy and Spanish society. In April 2022, Spanish prosecutors opened an investigation into Soluciones de Gestión y Apoyo a Empresas (SGAE), a business services firm, over six suspicious public contracts awarded to it for the sale of health equipment in the COVID-19 pandemic, which were not subjected to the usual bidding process due to urgent need. The contracts involved several government agencies, as follows:

1. 21 March 2020: Ports of the State, a subsidiary of the Ministry of Transport, purchased 8 million masks for €24.2 million.
2. 27 March 2020: Adif, another subsidiary of the same government department, purchased 5 million masks for €12.5 million.
3. 20 April 2020: the Secretariat of State for Security, which is under the Ministry of the Interior, purchased health equipment for €3.5 million.
4. 22 April 2020: the Government of the Canary Islands paid €7.3 million through its public health body for masks.
5. 4 May 2020: another purchase by the Canarian government for masks, this time for €5 million.
6. 8 May 2020: the Government of the Balearic Islands paid €3.7 million through its public health body for masks.

In all, SGAE invoiced the government for €54 million in at least eight public health contracts throughout the pandemic, netting a profit of €17 million through three central government departments and two PSOE-controlled regional governments. It was alleged that using SGAE led to a sophisticated network of companies based in Luxembourg and Brazil, through the latter's accounts with the bank Itaú Unibanco. Through this, it was alleged that it would become difficult to trace the money back. These purchases took place even though, in 2020, the lawyer Ramiro Grau Morancho had warned Sánchez's government that using SGAE as the sole supplier of health equipment to Spain was questionable, given that they had no prior experience in the supply of PPEs. Grau Morancho referred the case to the Office of the Attorney General and to the Supreme Court, both of which dismissed his concerns.

== Investigation ==
=== Operación Delorme ===
On 6 September 2023, the Anticorruption Prosecutor's Office filed charges before the Audiencia Nacional against seven public figures, including Koldo García Izaguirre, the former advisor to transport minister José Luis Ábalos. The judge Ismael Moreno Chamarro agreed to take on the case.

==== Arrests ====
On 21 February 2024, the Civil Guard arrested 20 people including Koldo García and his wife Patricia Úriz, on suspicion of misusing his relationships with Ábalos and other key government figures to obtain public contracts for SGAE, and taking commission on it. The Anticorruption Prosecutor's Office also noted that he had almost quadrupled his net worth, particularly in the period 2020–2022, through questionable real estate acquisitions, such as three flats in Benidorm worth €1.5 million. García was alleged to have used third parties, such as close family members, to hide the source of his newfound wealth. Regarding the other eighteen arrested, fourteen were released the same day, while the other four were released the day after. García's brother, Joseba, was one of those arrested, and the Anticorruption Prosecutor's Office had suspected that his brother's actions had increased his net worth 27 fold. He was released the next day.

=== European Commission investigation ===
After the scandal in Spain came to light, the European Commission launched an investigation in June 2023 to determine whether European Union funds were misused in the corruption scandal. Of particular note to European investigators are the contracts supplied to the regional governments in the Canary Islands and Balearic Islands in April and May 2020 respectively. The Ciudadanos party in the European Parliament reported the potential illicit use of European Regional Development Fund money to buy health equipment during the pandemic to the European Public Prosecutor's Office. In the May 2023 Spanish regional elections, both the Canary Islands and Balearic Islands regional governments flipped from the PSOE to the People's Party (PP). On 26 February 2024, Spanish judge Moreno Chamarro ordered that a copy of the case from the Anticorruption Prosecutor's Office be sent to the EPPO, along with a report into the awarding of contracts to SGAE, after the order of secrecy around the investigation was lifted.

On 4 March 2024, the EPPO announced that it would investigate the Canaries and Balearic governments' purchases of masks, and the Audiencia Nacional judge Manuel García-Castellón agreed to hear the case. While García-Castellón would ultimately judge the case, European prosecutors rather than Spanish ones would lead the investigation. On 14 March 2024, Johannes Hahn, the European Commissioner for Budget and Administration, promised that the scrutiny would be rigorous to protect the integrity of member states' contributions and Monika Hohlmeier asked the Spanish government to collaborate fully with the European investigation. During this time, the new PP government in the Balearic Islands let the claim against the purchase of defective masks during the pandemic expire.

On 9 and 10 April 2024, the EPPO seized a series of documents relating to the purchase of SGAE's masks, confirming that the Balearic government spent €3.7 million and the Canaries €12 million. Overall, European investigators suspected illegalities in €32 million worth of mask purchases. An advance of €2 million was paid to a company with no prior experience in health equipment for a million masks which never arrived. The Anticorruption Prosecutor's Office later advised European investigators to narrow the investigation solely to contracts which affected European payments, rather than all of SGAE's contracts.

=== Case returned to Audiencia Nacional ===
On 26 June 2024, the Supreme Court handed those parts of the case not involving EU financial interests back to the Audiencia Nacional, refusing to hear it as EU financial interests were not directly affected in those parts. On 8 October 2024, the Central Operative Unit of the Guardia Civil handed a report to judges suggesting that former minister José Luis Ábalos had a large role in the case. Ábalos had received various property gifts, including the use of an ocean-front house, from Victor de Aldama, the head of SGAE. The Central Operative Unit suggested the relationship between Ábalos and De Aldama went far beyond the contracts handed out in the pandemic, alleging that De Aldama leveraged his position to advance the Spanish government's bailout of the airline Air Europa with €475 million in 2020. The report also touched on the Delcygate scandal in 2020, which involved Venezuelan vice-president Delcy Rodríguez meeting with Ábalos and De Aldama in Madrid despite both knowing that the former was banned from the Schengen Area under sanctions against Nicolás Maduro's government. The report revealed that Pedro Sánchez did know about the visit, contrary to his statements at the time. On 23 October 2024, the Supreme Court ordered Ábalos' indictment due to his status as a person of interest. De Aldama was in prison for other fraud charges, including his having defrauded the Spanish Treasury by hundreds of millions of euros through his sale of gasoline.

On 21 November 2024, De Aldama agreed to testify voluntarily before judge Moreno. De Aldama declared that he had given bribes to the PSOE organization secretary Santos Cerdán (€15,000), María Jesús Montero (€25,000) who was the finance minister, Koldo García (€200,000), and Ábalos (€400,000). De Aldama also alleged that Sánchez himself had asked around to get to know him better, and had invited him to a meeting to thank him for his assistance. He said he also met minister Teresa Ribera and Begoña Gómez, Sánchez's wife. He also said that he took part in Delcy Rodríguez's visit, organising a dinner and inviting several ministers as well as Sánchez himself. That same day judge Santiago Pedraz tentatively released De Aldama for his co-operation in the investigation.

On 9 April 2025, the Central Operative Unit published another document revealing that Javier Hidalgo, the chief executive of Globalia, the owners of Air Europa, had asked Begoña Gómez personally to ensure the bailout of Air Europa. It also revealed that Víctor de Aldama said in a text conversation with Koldo García Izaguirre that "[Hidalgo] is very much screwed over by this, he's trying to get his life back and he just called Begoña". Hidalgo and Gómez held two secret meetings afterwards. According to the Guardia Civil, Ábalos also took part in the negotiations for the Air Europa bailout, receiving a three-week stay in a Marbella villa as a thank-you gift from Globalia.

The report also implicated a partner of Ábalos in an extramarital affair, Jéssica, while she was working at the public mobility and transportation company INECO, as having mediated conversations between Isabel Pardo de Vera, the then-president of Administrador de Infraestructuras Ferroviarias (ADIF) and sister of well-known journalist Ana Pardo de Vera, and García Izaguirre. A text message, on 11 February 2019, was documented in which García Izaguirre says: "Just one thing: call the girl so she can start the formalities so Joseba can be contracted as secretary, if not José will cut my balls." According to the UCO, Jéssica had lived for three years in a flat in the Plaza de España in Madrid, paid for by the group as a thank-you to Ábalos. Pardo de Vedra had also taken part in a renegotiation of the contract in November 2019. That year, Ábalos also asked García Izaguirre to hire another former partner, Claudia Montes, a former Miss Asturias, at Logirail, a public firm, asking on 8 October of that year: "You can't employ the one from Gijón at Renfe, ADIF or one of their subcontractors?"

On 12 May 2025, the El Mundo newspaper leaked WhatsApp messages from November 2021 in which Sánchez reached out to Ábalos, who had left his position the previous year, saying "Good morning, José Luís. It's been a while since we spoke. I'm writing to express my solidarity with you regarding the rumours that, unfortunately, we are seeing in the media. A hug." They appeared to be in sporadic contact, exchanging birthday messages and discussing politics, with Sánchez writing after the 2023 Spanish general election: "Thank you, José Luís. The truth is that I've missed working with you many times. I've always valued your political credentials. Also your friendship. Finally, I send you a hug."

On 20 May, judge Moreno Chamarro charged de Vera with embezzlement of public funds and influence peddling during her time as ADIF president. The decision to charge her came after she declared as a witness in the case before the Supreme Court, the evidence from the April Central Operative Unit report and her heading of the Anticorruption Ministry. On 26 May, El Confidencial released audio recordings in which Leire Díez Castro, a well-known left-wing journalist and a close friend of PSOE committee secretary Santos Cerdán, was shown to have met with lawyer Jacobo Teijelo and a range of businesspeople including Javier Pérez Dolset and Alejandro Hamlyn, to discuss finding information that would be damaging to Antonio Balas Dávila, the police officer leading the anti-corruption investigations into Ábalos, Gómez and David Sánchez (Sánchez's brother, whose role in another corruption scandal was coming into question). The mission also intended to discredit Juan Vicente Bonilla, an experienced Central Operative Unit investigator who had assisted in the 3% Case in Catalonia in 2005, against member of the party of Carles Puigdemont. Leire Díez offered the entrepreneurs favorable contracts with government bodies.

On 28 May, El Confidencial released another recording in which Pérez Dolset, speaking of the effort to tarnish the anti-corruption police unit, is heard saying: "This is Pedro Sánchez directly with Cerdán, with Santos Cerdán and with Leire. And there are also very few other people who have the information and that's how it's going to stay." According to El Mundo, Leire Díez also met with Rubén Villalba, a Civil Guard officer who was himself indicted in the case, to ask him for sensitive information that might help damage the reputation of those leading the judicial investigation and to silence Aldama. This appeared to corroborate an interview that De Aldama gave to Ana Rosa Quintana in March of that year, in which he called all three of those involved in the first meeting "the fountains – or let's call them the sewers – of the PSOE, who are under Santos Cerdán's command." He continued: "They're getting in touch with businesspeople and people to offer them pardons and always to offer them favourable contracts, so that when they testify against me, they'll lie about me."

On 12 June, judge Leopoldo Puente lifted the order of secrecy on a new report from the Civil Guard's Central Operative Unit, which implicated Cerdán in having handed out contracts for public works projects across the country, with de Vera's help, to friendly businesses including Acciona SA, LIP and OPR, giving more than €600,000 in bribes in exchange. The Guardía Civil had found the statements on a hard drive at Ábalos' home, and described Cerdán as heading up a presumed criminal organisation, opening up the possibility that mystery money may have been handed to parties not just within the PSOE and those already involved, but outside parties and potentially serious illegal financing. The Central Operative Unit report also alleged that Koldo asked Cerdán to employ another girlfriend in an affair, Nicole Neacsu, within Emfesa, linked to ADIF. Evidence also suggested that Sánchez himself may have found out and known for some time what Ábalos and Koldo were doing and its potential illegality. Two days later, Cerdán left the PSOE and resigned his seat in the Congress of Deputies.

On 21 July, de Vera and Javier Herrero Lizano, the former railways director, would be prosecuted in the Audiencia Nacional. Judge Ismael Moreno also confiscated Pardo de Vera's passport and prohibited her from leaving Spain. This was in response to a report published by the Guardía Civil, which suggested that Pardo de Vera and Herrero may have lobbied key figures in Ábalos' ministry for favourable contracts. Earlier on 30 June, Leopoldo Puente had sent Santos Cerdán to prison due to his refusal to answer questions in court about the case, believing that there was a risk that Cerdán would be able to escape. Sánchez said that "the PSOE has already acted, now justice must settle the responsabilities." Cerdán submitted an appeal to leave prison some weeks later; however it was rejected by the court as it could pose a risk for the investigation.

On 3 October 2025, the Central Operative Unit published a new report which revealed that Ábalos had received at least €95,437.33 in cash, sent in envelopes with PSOE branding from anonymous sources between 2017 and 2021. This included €20,799.40 in "personal charges from an undeclared source of funds". Sánchez distanced himself from the revelations: in response, at a PSOE press conference, he said he had trusted Ábalos and Cerdán and been betrayed. It also revealed that Ábalos, Koldo and the latter's then-wife Patricia Úriz had conversations over many years using codewords to describe banknotes, with €500 notes being called "txistorras", €200 notes being called "suns" and €100 notes being called "lettuces", with Ábalos calling money "folders" more generally. The report also unveiled the existence of an illicit bank account managed by Koldo and Patricia Úriz and suggested that, while some PSOE accounts may have made legitimate payments to Ábalos, others in cash were not mentioned in the statements given to the courts. While PSOE chiefs denied that the report suggested any illegal financing, arguing that the party's political and media opponents had long accused the PSOE of this. On 6 October, it was revealed that Santos Cerdán had continued to collect suspicious cash payments after replacing Ábalos as the PSOE's Secretary of Organisation, and took payments even after the scandal had started to raise eyebrows. In response, Cerdán questioned how the PP, which had called for Sánchez's resignation, had known the contents of the report before it had been handed to the Supreme Court.
