= Santos Cerdán =

Spanish politician (born 1969)

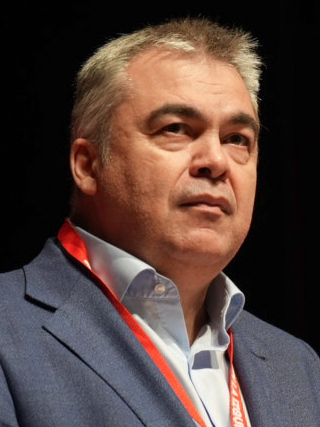
- Cerdán in 2025

Member of the Congress of Deputies
- In office 21 May 2019 – 16 June 2025
- Succeeded by: Iván Cacho
- Constituency: Navarre

Secretary of Organisation of the Spanish Socialist Workers' Party
- In office 13 July 2021 – 12 June 2025
- Preceded by: José Luis Ábalos
- Succeeded by: Rebeca Torró

Personal details
- Born: 4 May 1969 (age 57) Milagro, Navarre, Spain
- Party: Independent (since 2025)
- Other political affiliations: Spanish Socialist Workers' Party (1999–2025)
- Occupation: Politician

Santos Cerdán León (born 4 May 1969) is a Spanish former politician. A long-time figure in the PSOE, he served as its Secretary of Organisation from 2021 to 2025. From 2014 to 2017, he was a member of the Parliament of Navarre, and from 2019 to 2025 he was a member of the Congress of Deputies. Cerdán resigned from both positions, and left the PSOE, after being implicated in by the Civil Guard in the Koldo Case in 2025. He's accused of preferentially handing out public works contracts and illegally financing projects for friends of the PSOE.

== Early life ==
Coming from a militant socialist family background, Cerdán took studies at the second stage of professional development, getting a degree as a technician in industrial electronics. He started his professional career in the food and agricultural sectors.

== Political career ==
Cerdán joined the PSOE in 1999 and has been a member of the regional Socialist Party of Navarre since 2004. He was a councillor in Navarre from 1999 to 2003 and again from 2007 until 2015. He entered the Parliament of Navarre in 2014, replacing Román Felones, and was re-elected in the 2015 election. Cerdán did not join national politics until Pedro Sánchez nominated him at the 2017 congress for election as Secretary-General against Susana Díaz and Patxi López. He was elected to the Congress of Deputies for Navarre at the April 2019 election, which was won by the PSOE. He was re-elected in November that year.

In 2020, Cerdán was elected as the head of the Pablo Iglesias Foundation, a socialist cultural institution. In 2021, Cerdán was elected Secretary-General of the PSOE, replacing José Luis Ábalos. He was replaced as head of the Pablo Iglesias Foundation in 2022 by María Luisa Carcedo. After the 2023 election, Sánchez charged Cerdán with negotiating with Junts per Catalunya during the extended government formation, for votes that the PSOE needed to form a government. Cerdán met with Carles Puigdemont, at that time exiled from Spain, in Brussels, during which he was described as the PSOE's "number three".

== Koldo Case ==
On 30 April 2024, Cerdán faced the committee investigating the Koldo Case, having brought Koldo García, who was being investigated in the case, into the PSOE's top circles. Cerdán admitted to having been in regular contact with García but denied knowing about questionable purchases of masks during the COVID-19 pandemic, which had prompted the investigation. On 28 May 2025, El Confidencial released a recording in which Leire Díez Castro, a left-wing journalist and close friend of Cerdán, said: "This is Pedro Sánchez live with Cerdán - with Santos Cerdán - and with Leire. And there are very few other people who have this information, and that's how it's going to stay."

On 12 June 2025, a report on the case was published by the Central Operative Unit of the Guardía Civil. This revealed that Cerdán had handed out contracts for public works projects throughout the country to friendly businesses, and gave more than €600,000 in bribes in exchange. Guardía Civil investigators had found the details on a hard drive at Ábalos' home, and described Cerdán as heading up a possibly criminal organisation, proposing that money may have been handed to parties outside the PSOE as well as inside it, raising questions of illegal financing. The Central Operative Unit report also alleged that Koldo asked Cerdán to employ another girlfriend in an affair, Nicole Neacsu, within Emfesa, linked to ADIF. Evidence also suggested that Pedro Sánchez himself may have found out, and known for some time, what Ábalos and Koldo were doing and its potential illegality. Two days later, Cerdán left the PSOE and resigned his seat in the Congress of Deputies.

On 30 June 2025, Cerdán was sent to prison for refusing to answer questions in court about the case, with judge Leopoldo Puente believing there was a risk of Cerdán escaping justice. Cerdán submitted an appeal some weeks later, yet it was refused by the courts for fear of its potential impact on the investigation. On 6 October, it was revealed that Cerdán had collected suspicious cash payments in PSOE-branded envelopes after replacing Ábalos as Secretary-General of the PSOE in 2021. Cerdán had continued to take cash payments even after the scandal had come to light. In response, Cerdán questioned how the opposition PP had known the report's contents before its submission to the Supreme Court. On 19 November, he was granted provisional release from prison, with the investigating judge, Leopoldo Puente, stating that newly gathered information had confirmed and strengthened evidence of Cerdán's criminality, allowing for the opening of "new lines of inquiry."
