= Isabel Pardo de Vera =

Spanish engineer (born 1975)

Isabel Pardo de Vera Posada
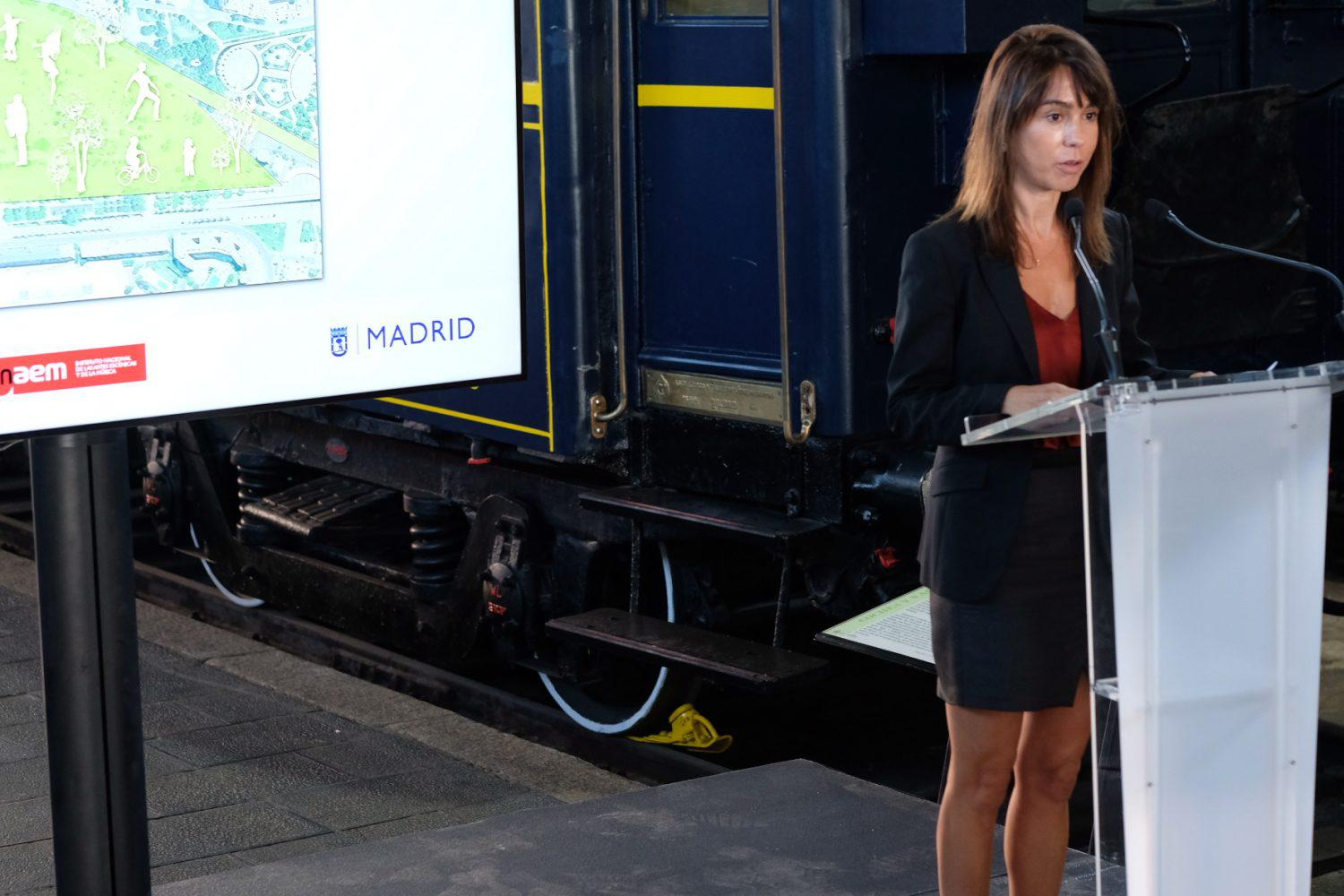

Secretary of State for Infrastructure, Transport and Housing
- In office 28 July 2021 – 22 February 2023
- Prime Minister: Pedro Sánchez
- Preceded by: Pedro Saura García
- Succeeded by: David Lucas

Personal details
- Born: 1975 (age 50–51)

Isabel Pardo de Vera Posada (born 1975) is a Spanish engineer. She was the first woman to be president of the state-owned railway company Administrador de Infraestructuras Ferroviarias (ADIF) from 2018 to 2021 and was Secretary of State for Infrastructure, Transport and Housing from 2021 to 2023.

== Personal life ==
Pardo de Vera was born in Lugo, Galicia. Her father Gerardo Pardo de Vera was the first democratically elected mayor of Becerreá in the Province of Lugo for the People's Alliance and her sister Ana became a journalist.

== Education ==
Pardo de Vera finished her studies in road, canal and port engineering at University of A Coruña in July 2001. She completed an MBA from the Instituto de Educación Superior Intercontinental de la Empresa in 2007 graduated from ESADE Business School in 2009.

== Career ==
Pardo de Vera began working in 2007 for Administrador de Infraestructuras Ferroviarias (ADIF), the state-owned railway company. She had positions in the management of the Madrid–Galicia high-speed rail line. In 2015, she took leave from ADIF to be Director of Mobility and Infrastructure for the provincial deputation of the Province of Pontevedra, returning in 2016. In June 2018, Pardo de Vera became the first woman to be president of ADIF. In July 2018, she was named Secretary of State for Infrastructure, Transport and Housing in the government of Pedro Sánchez of the Spanish Socialist Workers' Party (PSOE).

Pardo de Vera resigned on 20 February 2023, as did Isaías Tabóas, the president of state railway operator Renfe. The trigger event for the resignations was the €258 million order of 31 trains for the mountainous northern autonomous communities of Asturias and Cantabria. The trains were ordered with dimensions too wide for the regions' tunnels; though these trains were not manufactured, the error put their estimated completion date back from 2024 to at least 2026.

== Awards ==
- Monforte Railway Award (2018)
- Gold Medal of the City of Vigo (2022)
