= Raquel Sánchez Jiménez =

Spanish politician

The Most Excellent Raquel Sánchez Jiménez
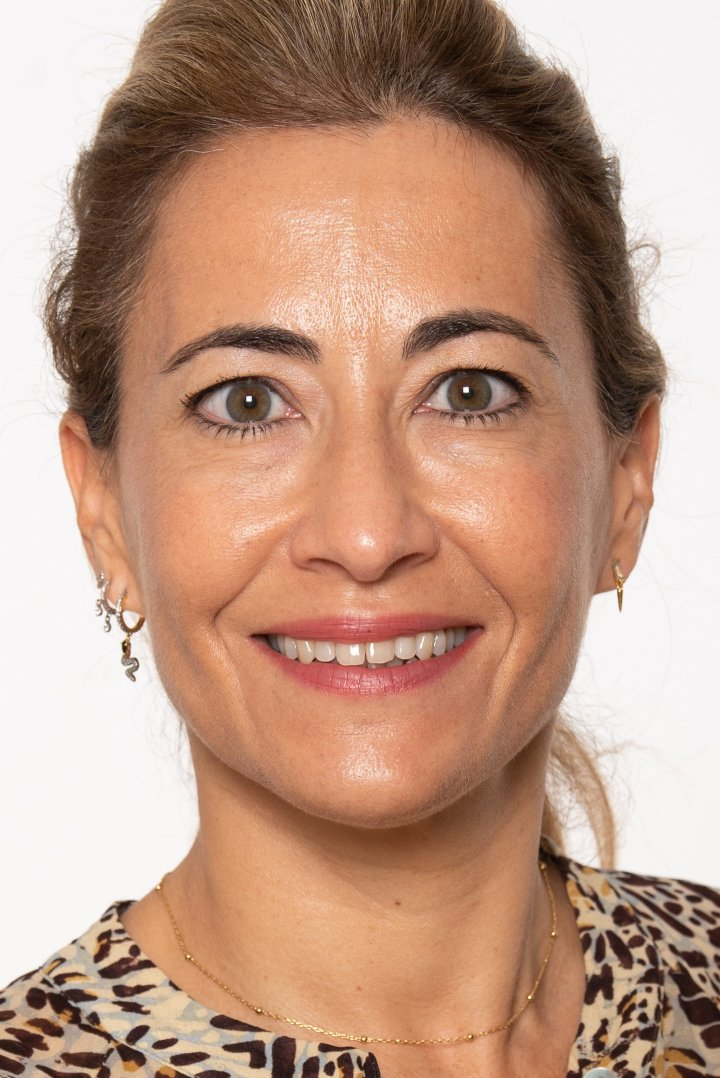

Minister of Transport, Mobility and Urban Agenda
- In office 12 July 2021 – 21 November 2023
- Monarch: Felipe VI
- Prime Minister: Pedro Sánchez
- Preceded by: José Luis Ábalos
- Succeeded by: Isabel Rodríguez García

Member of the Congress of Deputies
- In office 17 August 2023 – 28 December 2023
- Succeeded by: Josep Paré Aregall
- Constituency: Barcelona

Mayor of Gavà
- In office 15 February 2014 – 11 July 2021
- Preceded by: Joaquim Balsera Garcia
- Succeeded by: Gemma Badia

Personal details
- Born: 18 November 1975 (age 50) Gavá, Barcelona, Spain
- Party: Socialists' Party of Catalonia

Raquel Sánchez Jiménez (born 18 November 1975) is a Spanish lawyer and politician of the Socialists' Party of Catalonia who has been serving as Minister of Transport, Mobility and Urban Agenda of the Government of Spain since July 2021, in the cabinet presided by Pedro Sánchez.

== Political career ==
Sánchez Jiménez previously served as mayor of Gavà since 2014.

In 2022, Sánchez Jiménez led negotiations with Spain’s transport associations that resulted in a 1 billion euro ($1.10 billion) support package aimed at defusing the walkout over fuel prices that has caused sporadic goods shortages. In response, Spanish truck drivers announced in March 2022 they would continue their strike "indefinitely."
