= Josep Paré Aregall =

Spanish politician (born 1983)

Member of the Congress of Deputies
- Incumbent
- Assumed office 10 January 2024
- Preceded by: Raquel Sánchez Jiménez
- Constituency: Barcelona

Personal details
- Born: 3 July 1983 (age 43)
- Party: Socialists' Party of Catalonia

Josep Paré Aregall (born 3 July 1983) is a Spanish politician serving as a member of the Congress of Deputies since 2024. He has served as mayor of Centelles since 2019.
