= Margarita Robles =

Spanish judge and politician (born 1956)

The Most Excellent Margarita Robles OSRP
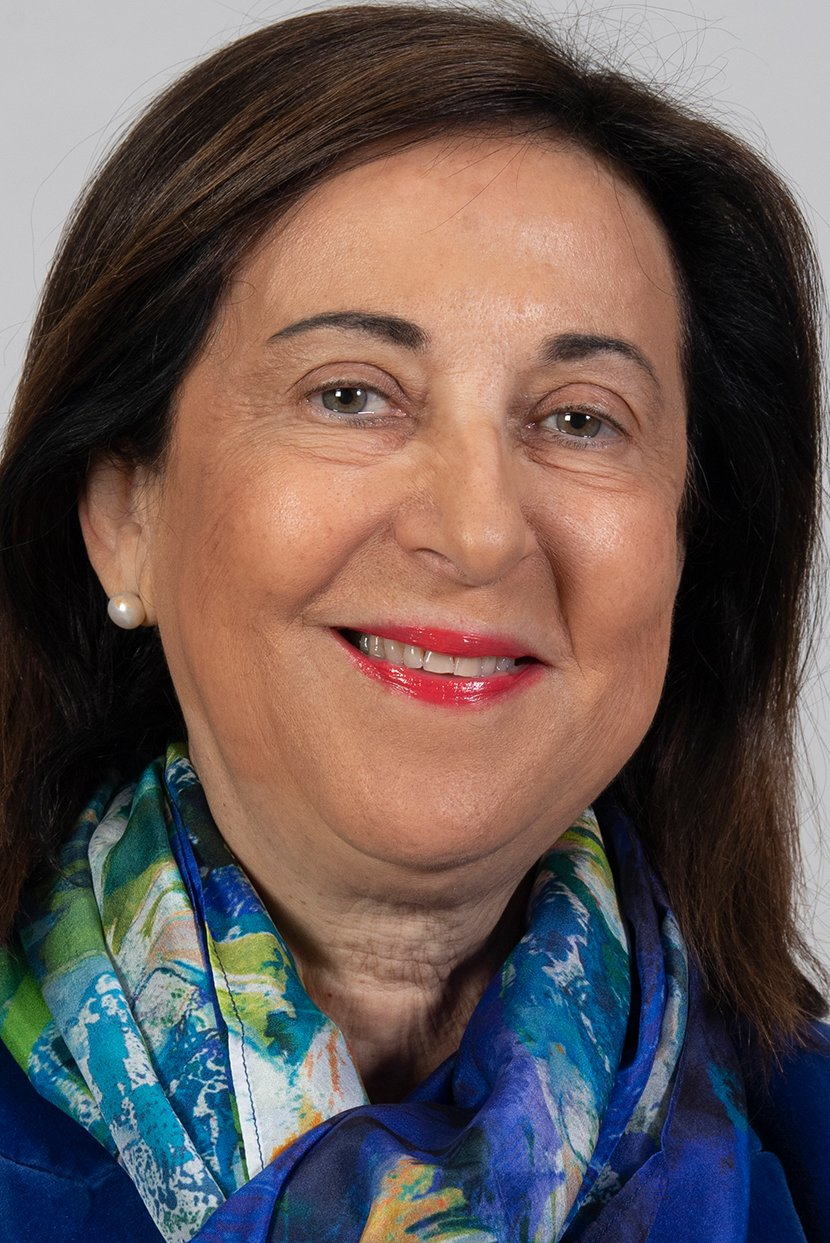
- Official portrait, 2023

Minister of Defence
- Incumbent
- Assumed office 7 June 2018
- Monarch: Felipe VI
- Prime Minister: Pedro Sánchez
- Preceded by: María Dolores de Cospedal

Minister of Foreign Affairs, European Union and Cooperation
- Acting; 30 November 2019 – 13 January 2020
- Monarch: Felipe VI
- Prime Minister: Pedro Sánchez
- Preceded by: Josep Borrell
- Succeeded by: Arancha González Laya

Leader of the Socialist Group in the Congress of Deputies
- In office 19 June 2017 – 7 June 2018
- Deputy: Miguel Ángel Heredia
- Preceded by: José Luis Ábalos
- Succeeded by: Adriana Lastra

Magistrate of the Supreme Court
- In office 1 January 2005 – 4 July 2016

Member of the Congress of Deputies
- In office 17 August 2023 – 1 December 2023
- Constituency: Madrid
- In office 21 May 2019 – 21 February 2020
- Succeeded by: Manuel Arribas
- Constituency: Ávila
- In office 19 July 2016 – 15 June 2018
- Constituency: Madrid

Personal details
- Born: 10 November 1956 (age 69) León, Spain
- Party: Independent
- Education: University of Barcelona
- Occupation: Judge, politician
- Awards: Grand Cross of the Order of St. Raymond Penyafort

María Margarita Robles Fernández (pronounced [maɾɣaˈɾita ˈroβles]; born 10 November 1956) is a Spanish judge and politician, serving as Minister of Defence since June 2018, the longest-serving female minister of Spain. From November 2019 to January 2020, she served as Acting Minister of Foreign Affairs.

She was the first woman ever to chair a contentious-administrative chamber, the first to ever preside a provincial court (Barcelona's) and the first woman to reach the Supreme Court of Spain. She has also held the positions of Secretary of State for Security during the González Governments.

From May 2004 until May 2016 she was a Justice at the Supreme Court, in the third Chamber. She was a member of the General Council of the Judiciary from September 2008 until December 2013 on the proposal of the Spanish Socialist Workers' Party. She belongs to the progressive judge association Judges for Democracy.

In May 2016 she was elected to the Congress of Deputies for the PSOE representing Madrid. In the context of the 2026 Spanish general election, Robles was announced as the running mate —occupying the number two spot— on the PSOE electoral lists for Prime Minister Pedro Sánchez in Madrid.

== Early life and education ==
Robles was born in 1956 in León, the daughter of a lawyer and housewife. She undertook her primary education in the Teresian Carmelites school. At the age of 12, her family moved to Barcelona, where she graduated in law at the University of Barcelona. Her younger brother is a doctor.

== Early judicial career ==
In 1981, at age 25, Robles entered the Judiciary, after completing her training at the Judiciary School, first of her class, and became the fourth woman judge in Spain.

At age 26 she took her first assignment as Judge of First Instance and Inquiry of Balaguer, later she was assigned to Sant Feliu de Llobregat and Bilbao. She was the first woman ever to chair a contentious-administrative chamber.

She was a magistrate at the Audiencia Provincial of Barcelona, becoming its president at age 34, and becoming the first woman to be president of an Audiencia Provincial.

== Early political career ==
Close to the Spanish Socialist Workers' Party in 1993 she was appointed Under Secretary of the Ministry of Justice under Juan Alberto Belloch. On her inauguration she established as her top priority to implement fast trials in Spain.

Between 1994 and 1996, during the last government of Felipe González, Robles served as the first Secretary of State for the Interior, becoming the de facto second-in-command of the superministry of Justice and the Interior, also under Belloch.

During her time as Secretary of State for the Interior, Robles promoted the investigation of the kidnapping and murder of José Antonio Lasa and José Ignacio Zabala, she withdrew the funds from the GAL dirty war for José Amedo and Michel Domínguez and she ordered the search and capture of Luis Roldán.

== Return to the judiciary ==
After Gonzalez lost the 1996 General Elections, Robles returned to the judiciary and became a justice at the contentious-administrative chamber of the Audiencia Nacional. In 2004, she was appointed Justice of the third chamber of the Supreme Court, becoming the fourth woman ever to be appointed to the highest court.

In September 2008 she was elected member of the General Council of the Judiciary (CGPJ), being considered of one of its most active members. She served as such until December 2013. During her term as such, she supported the removal from office of the President of the General Council of the Judiciary and President of the Supreme Court, Carlos Dívar.

=== Garzón case ===
In March 2010, Margarita Robles, along with conservatives Fernando de Rosa Torner and Gemma Gallego Sánchez, were challenged as members by the judge of the National Court, Baltasar Garzón, who asked the Criminal Chamber of the Supreme Court to keep him in his position, for being the three CGPJ members that have shown the most animosity against him.

On 25 June 2017, in an interview in La Sexta, Police Commissioner Villarejo accused her of commissioning a report against Garzón.

== Return to politics ==
In May 2016, Robles jumped back into politics when Pedro Sánchez announced she would occupy the second spot of the socialist list for Madrid in the upcoming general election.

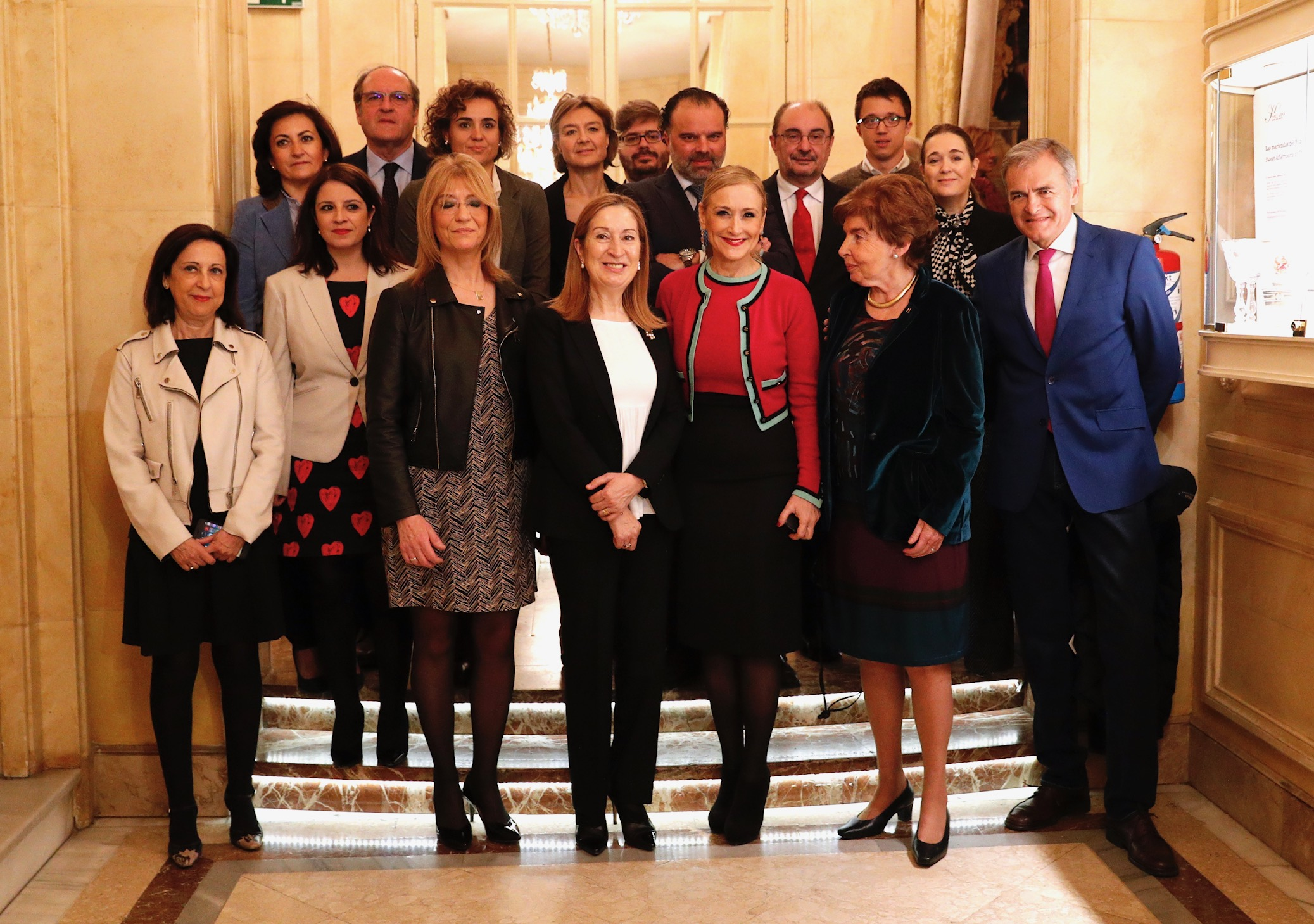
Robles (left) in March 2018.

Robles requested a leave of absence from the judiciary, but on 19 May the CGPJ voted 4 to 3 that a leave of absence to occupy a political position implies the renunciation of the position as Supreme Court Justice.

She positioned with Sánchez in the ensuing leadership crisis that affected the PSOE following the elections. During the investiture vote of Mariano Rajoy, she was one of the 15 socialist MP's that did not abstain, thus rejecting her party's line. At the 39th Socialist Congress she supported Pedro Sánchez's candidacy to Secretary-General of the party (despite not being able to vote herself as she was not a card carrying member). After Sánchez had won the congress, Robles was appointed spokesperson of the Socialist Parliamentary Group, replacing José Luis Ábalos.

In June 2018, following the successful vote of no confidence against Mariano Rajoy, Robles was appointed Minister of Defence by the new Prime Minister Pedro Sánchez.

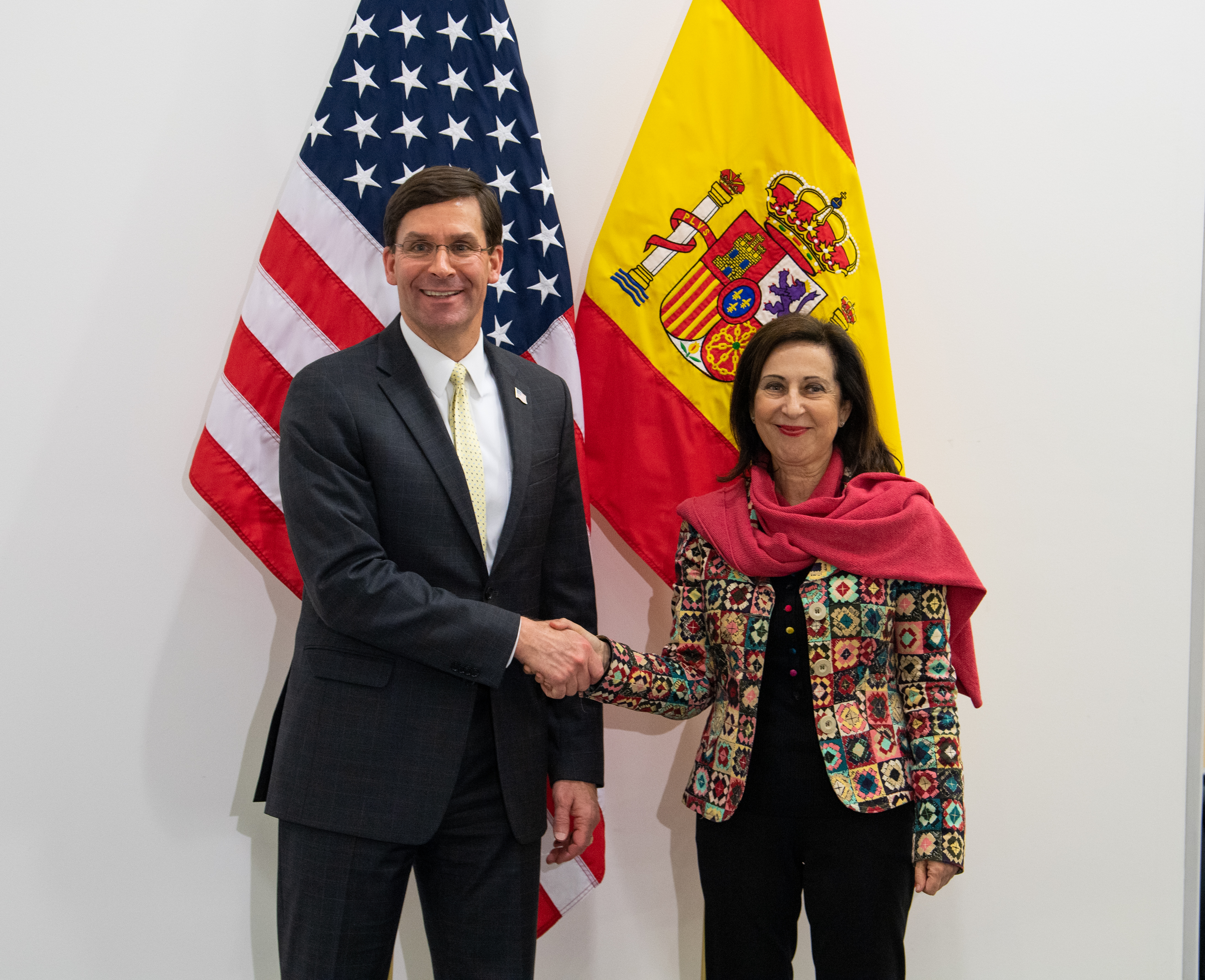
Robles with the U.S. Defense Secretary, Mark Esper, during the Defense Ministerial meeting in 2020.

=== Defence Minister ===
With the appointment of Pedro Sánchez as Prime Minister of Spain, Robles was appointed by Sánchez a week later to assume the office of Minister of Defence thus vanishing the speculation that Robles could take over a "superministry" of Interior and Justice (as happened between 1994 and 1996 with minister Juan Alberto Belloch).

At the beginning of her term as Defence Minister, Robles had to face some controversies like the prohibition to use tattoos in visible places that mainly affected women (because of the use of the skirt in the female military uniform), the publication of a manifesto by retired military officials in support of dictator Francisco Franco and more controversies around the S-80 class submarine.

In May 2024, she said that what was happening in Gaza during the Gaza war is "a real genocide". Her comments were criticized by the Israeli embassy in Spain.

==== Military programs ====
Her department approved major defence projects like upgrading the budget of the S-80 submarines by € 1.8 billion, and another billion for the modernization of the Boeing CH-47 Chinook of the Army which added to other military projects, in her first 3 months in office she approved investments worth 5 billion.

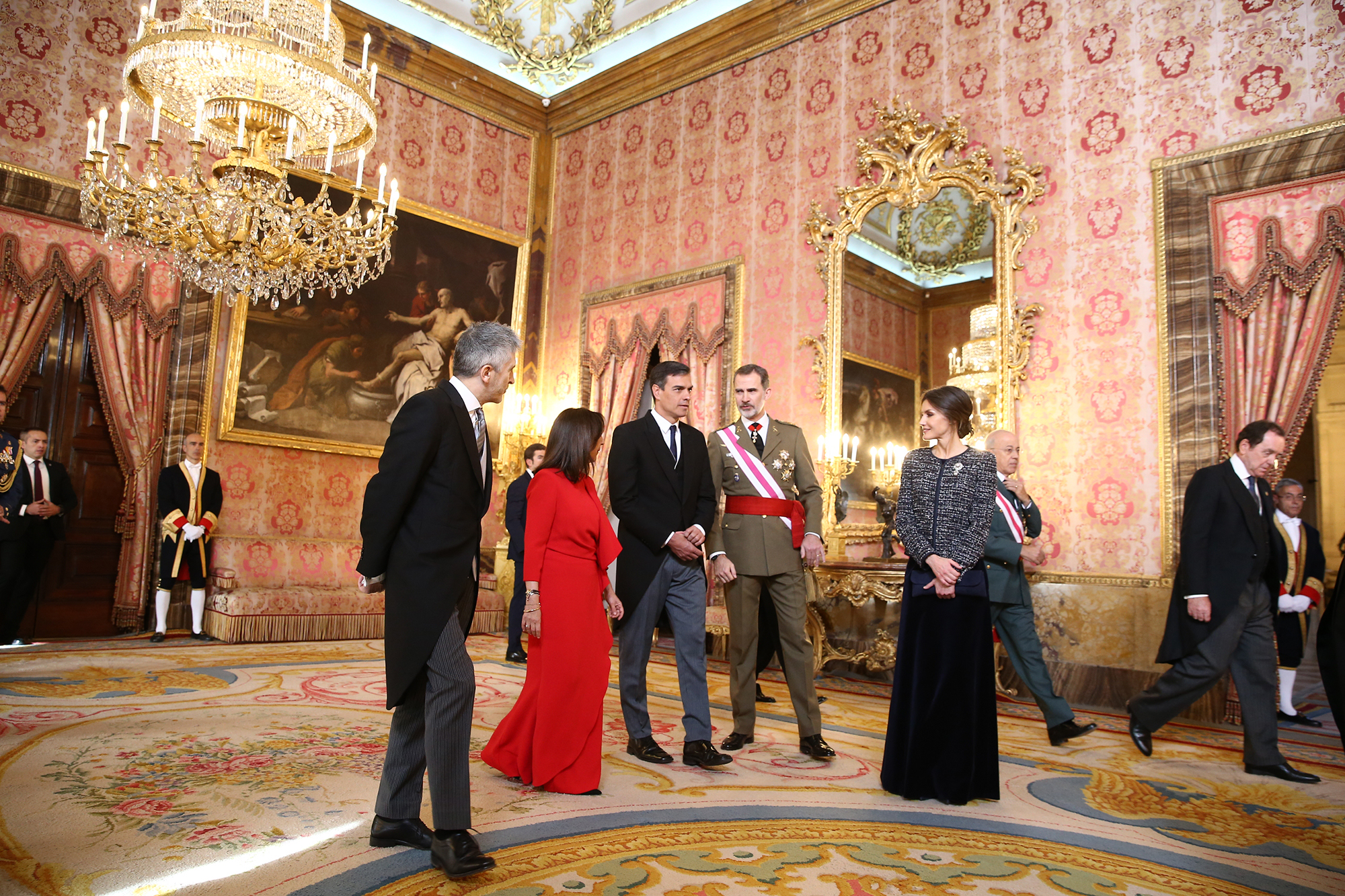
Robles attends to the 2019 Pascua Militar at the Royal Palace.

On 4 September 2018 the Ministry of Defence announced that it was considering cancelling a major contract with Saudi Arabia consisting in 400 laser-guided bombs because of the possible use of these weapons in the Saudi-led intervention in the Yemeni civil war. However, a few days later the Prime Minister and the Defence Minister itself confirmed that the contract would go ahead to avoid a possible diplomatic conflict with Saudi Arabia that could put at risk Navantia's 2 billion contract.

In October that year, when the assassination of Saudi Arabian journalist Jamal Khashoggi was discovered the international community rapidly reproached this event and some European countries like Germany cancelled its military contracts with Saudi Arabia and called for the rest of the EU countries to do the same, a petition that was ignored by those countries including Spain, in order to protect thousands of jobs that said military contract generates. A month later both countries created a joint venture to build five corvettes.

On 14 December 2018 the Council of Ministers approved Minister Robles' plan to build five new F110 class frigates to replace the old Santa María class, 348 battle vehicles and upgrading the Eurofighter jet worth € 7.3 billion to be paid over the next 15 years.

On 30 January 2019 she accompanied King Felipe VI on his trip to Iraq to mark the King's 51st birthday. They visited the contingent of more than 300 Spanish soldiers from the Besmayah "Gran Capitán" base.

On 23 March 2021 the Council of Ministers, at the proposal of the minister, approved increasing the salary of military personnel. It was the first salary increase for these personnel since 2005. Months later, on 29 June that year, the Council of Ministers authorized three new projects to strengthen the aeronautical sector. Specifically, the financing of the second phase of the Future Combat Air System (FCAS) was approved, as well as the acquisition of three A330 MRTT aircraft for the Air Force and, together with the Ministry of the Interior, the acquisition of H135 and H160 helicopters; all this valued at more than 3.5 billion euros.

==== COVID-19 pandemic ====
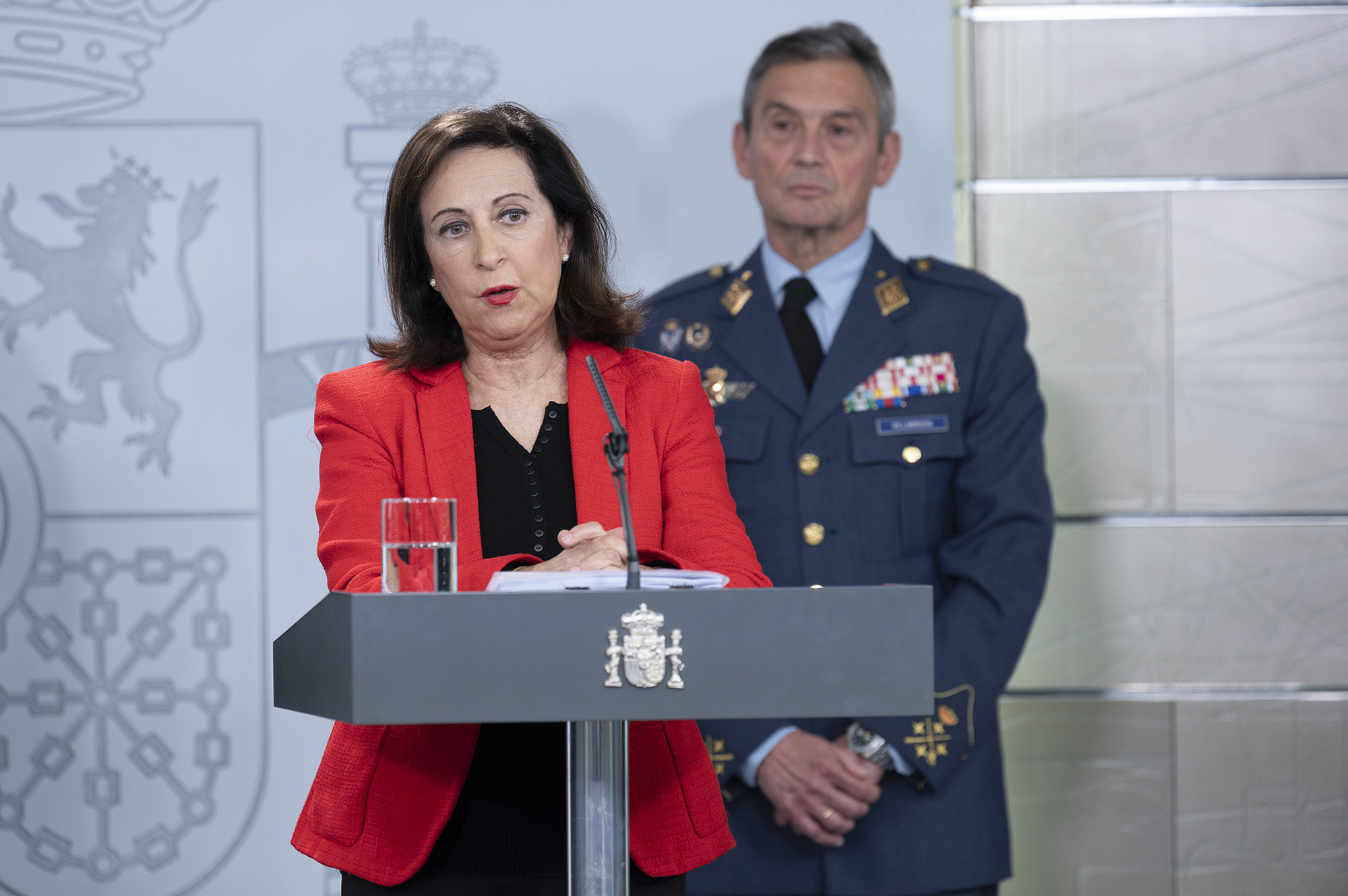
Robles addresses the Spanish citizens in a press conference due to COVID-19 pandemic.

In March 2020, the Prime Minister designated her as one of the four delegated authorities in charge of direct management of the health crisis of COVID-19. For this task, under her direction, Robles appointed the JEMAD, Miguel Ángel Villarroya Vilalta, as sole command of all the measures that his department carried out.

During the health crisis, her department mainly deployed the Military Emergencies Unit (UME), which was responsible for the disinfection of thousands of retirement homes as well as other public places such as train stations, ports and airports. At the same time, different military, naval and air police units were also deployed to collaborate with the law enforcement agencies in public security tasks.

At the end of March, Robles publicly denounced abandoned, and sometimes dead, elderly people in some of the retirement homes that the UME had disinfected. The head of the Military Emergencies Unit, Luis Manuel Martínez Meijide, stated shortly after that these cases were "very punctual".

On 27 April Robles addressed the Defense Committee of the Congress of Deputies to explain the management that his department was carrying out. Margarita Robles praised the task of the Armed Forces, to which she attributed all the successes, and assumed "exclusively" all the errors that would have been committed as her own.

Due to her management in this crisis, the popularity of the minister soared, achieving an approval rating of close to 68%, the highest in a minister in decades.

==== Afghanistan crisis ====
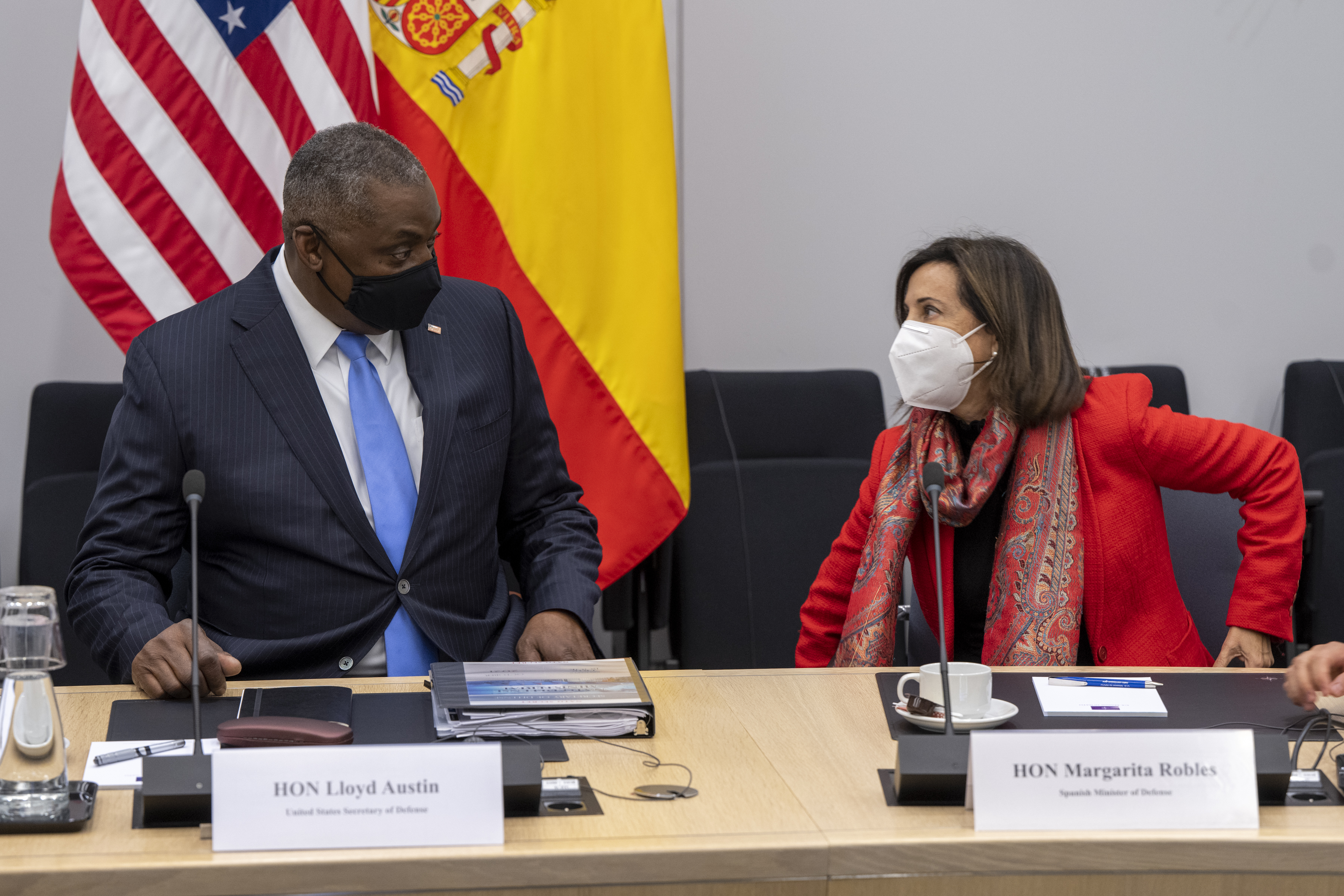
Robles with U.S. Secretary of Defense Lloyd Austin in October 2021

Following the fall of Kabul and the subsequent de facto creation of the Islamic Emirate of Afghanistan, the Prime Minister offered Spain as a hub for Afghans who collaborated with the European Union, which would later be settled in various countries. The Spanish government created a temporary refugee camp in the air base of Torrejón de Ardoz, which was later visited by the highest officials from the European Union. Other two Spanish bases, Rota and Morón, where also prepared to temporarily accommodate Afghan refugees from the United States. During this operation, the Spanish Armed Forces used four Airbus A400M Atlas as well as civil resources from the Air Europa airline to evacuate Spanish diplomats, nationals and Afghan citizens. The security team of the embassy, composed by 17 police officers from the GEO (special operations) and UIP (experts in mass control and VIP security), were responsible for locating and taking the collaborators to a safe place. Days later, the Spanish Army Special Operations Command (green berets) were also deployed in the Afghan capital.

=== Acting Foreign Minister ===
On 27 November 2019 the Office of the Prime Minister announced that because of the departure of Foreign Minister Borrell to the European Commission, Robles would temporary assume the office of Minister of Foreign Affairs until a new government is formed. She assumed the office on 30 November and she left it on 13 January, when Arancha González Laya assumed as new foreign minister.

== Other activities ==
- Elcano Royal Institute for International and Strategic Studies, Member of the Board of Trustees

== Awards and decorations ==
- : Grand Cross of the Order of St. Raymond of Peñafort (2013)
- : Grand Cross of the Order of Princess Olga 3rd class (2026)

Political offices
Preceded by Josep Borrell	Minister of Foreign Affairs; Acting; 2019–2020	Succeeded by Arancha González Laya
Preceded by María Dolores de Cospedal	Minister of Defence; 2018–present	Incumbent
Party political offices
Preceded by José Luis Ábalos Meco	Leader of the Socialist Group in the Congress of Deputies; 2017–2018	Succeeded by Adriana Lastra
