= Manuel Arribas =

Spanish politician (born 1986)

Member of the Congress of Deputies
- Incumbent
- Assumed office 25 February 2020
- Preceded by: Margarita Robles
- Constituency: Ávila

Personal details
- Born: 13 December 1986 (age 39)
- Party: Spanish Socialist Workers' Party

Manuel Arribas Maroto (born 13 December 1986) is a Spanish politician serving as a member of the Congress of Deputies since 2020. He has served as mayor of Sanchidrián since 2023.
