= 2003 Valencia municipal election =

Election in the Spanish municipality of Valencia

- 25 May 2003

All 33 seats in the City Council of Valencia 17 seats needed for a majority
- Opinion polls
- Registered: 631,225 ▼1.9%
- Turnout: 432,366 (68.5%) ▲5.8 pp
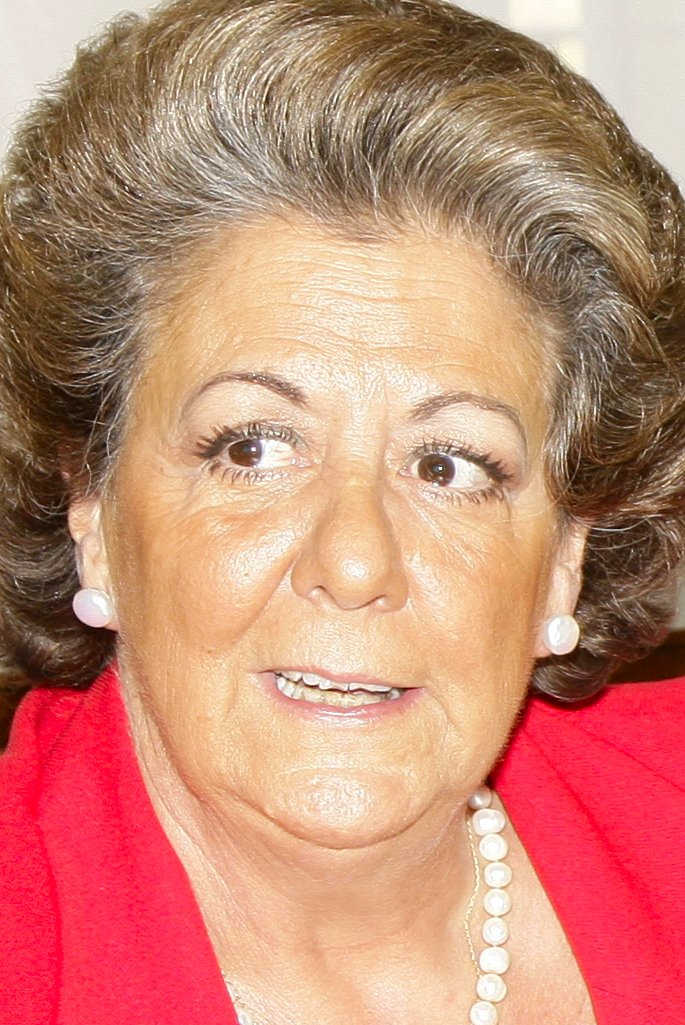

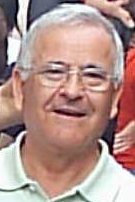
	First party	Second party	Third party
Leader	Rita Barberá	Rafael Rubio	Antonio Montalbán
Party	PP	PSPV–PSOE	L'Entesa
Leader since	1991	25 November 2000	19 December 1998
Last election	20 seats, 53.2%	11 seats, 29.0%	2 seats, 6.4%
Seats won	19	12	2
Seat change	▼1	▲1	0
Popular vote	220,548	132,903	31,519
Percentage	51.2%	30.8%	7.3%
Swing	▼2.0 pp	▲1.8 pp	▲0.9 pp
Mayor before election
Rita Barberá
PP
Mayor after election
Rita Barberá
PP

A municipal election was held in Valencia on 25 May 2003 to elect the 7th City Council of the municipality. All 33 seats in the City Council were up for election. It was held concurrently with regional elections in thirteen autonomous communities and local elections all across Spain.

== Overview ==
Under the 1978 Constitution, the governance of municipalities in Spain—part of the country's local government system—was centered on the figure of city councils (Spanish: ayuntamientos), local corporations with independent legal personality composed of a mayor, a government council and an elected legislative assembly. The mayor was indirectly elected by the local assembly, requiring an absolute majority; otherwise, the candidate from the most-voted party automatically became mayor (ties were resolved by drawing lots). In the case of Valencia, the top-tier administrative and governing body was the City Council of Valencia.

=== Date ===
The term of local assemblies in Spain expired four years after the date of their previous election, with election day being fixed for the fourth Sunday of May every four years. The election decree was required to be issued no later than 54 days before the scheduled election date and published on the following day in the Official State Gazette (BOE). The previous local elections were held on 13 June 1999, setting the date for election day on the fourth Sunday of May four years later, which was 25 May 2003.

Local assemblies could not be dissolved before the expiration of their term, except in cases of mismanagement that seriously harmed the public interest and implied a breach of constitutional obligations, in which case the Council of Ministers could—optionally—decide to call a by-election.

Elections to the assemblies of local entities were officially called on 1 April 2003 with the publication of the corresponding decree in the BOE, setting election day for 25 May.

=== Electoral system ===
Voting for local assemblies was based on universal suffrage, comprising all Spanish nationals over 18 years of age, registered and residing in the municipality and with full political rights (provided that they had not been deprived of the right to vote by a final sentence, nor were legally incapacitated), as well as resident non-national European citizens, and those whose country of origin allowed reciprocal voting by virtue of a treaty.

Local councillors were elected using the D'Hondt method and closed-list proportional voting, with a five percent-threshold of valid votes (including blank ballots) in each municipality. Each municipality was a multi-member constituency, with a number of seats based on the following scale:

Population	Councillors
<250	5
251–1,000	7
1,001–2,000	9
2,001–5,000	11
5,001–10,000	13
10,001–20,000	17
20,001–50,000	21
50,001–100,000	25
>100,001	+1 per each 100,000 inhabitants or fraction +1 if total is an even number

The law did not provide for by-elections to fill vacant seats; instead, any vacancies arising after the proclamation of candidates and during the legislative term were filled by the next candidates on the party lists or, when required, by designated substitutes.

== Parties and candidates ==
The electoral law allowed for parties and federations registered in the interior ministry, alliances and groupings of electors to present lists of candidates. Parties and federations intending to form an alliance were required to inform the relevant electoral commission within 10 days of the election call, whereas groupings of electors needed to secure the signature of a determined amount of the electors registered in the municipality for which they sought election, disallowing electors from signing for more than one list. In the case of Valencia, as its population was between 300,001 and 1,000,000, at least 5,000 signatures were required.

Below is a list of the main parties and alliances which contested the election:

Candidacy	Parties and alliances	Leading candidate	Ideology	Previous result		Gov.	Ref.
Candidacy	Parties and alliances	Leading candidate	Ideology	Vote %	Seats	Gov.	Ref.
PP	List: People's Party (PP)	Rita Barberá	Conservatism; Christian democracy	53.2%	20	Yes	
PSPV–PSOE	List: Socialist Party of the Valencian Country (PSPV–PSOE)	Rafael Rubio	Social democracy	29.0%	11	No	
L'Entesa	List: United Left of the Valencian Country (EUPV) – Communist Party of the Valencian Country (PCPV) – Revolutionary Workers' Party (POR) – Workers' Revolutionary Party–Revolutionary Left (PRT–IR); Valencian Left (EV)	Antonio Montalbán	Socialism; Communism	6.4%	2	No	
UV	List: Valencian Union (UV)	José María Chiquillo	Blaverism; Conservatism	4.7%	0	No	
Bloc–EV	List: Valencian Nationalist Bloc (Bloc); Green Left (EV)	Ferran Puchades	Valencian nationalism Progressivism; Ecologism	3.2%	0	No	

== Opinion polls ==
The tables below list opinion polling results in reverse chronological order, showing the most recent first and using the dates when the survey fieldwork was done, as opposed to the date of publication. Where the fieldwork dates are unknown, the date of publication is given instead. The highest percentage figure in each polling survey is displayed with its background shaded in the leading party's colour. If a tie ensues, this is applied to the figures with the highest percentages. The "Lead" column on the right shows the percentage-point difference between the parties with the highest percentages in a poll.

=== Voting intention estimates ===
The table below lists weighted voting intention estimates. Refusals are generally excluded from the party vote percentages, while question wording and the treatment of "don't know" responses and those not intending to vote may vary between polling organisations. When available, seat projections determined by the polling organisations are displayed below (or in place of) the percentages in a smaller font; 17 seats were required for an absolute majority in the City Council of Valencia.

Polling firm/Commissioner	Fieldwork date	Sample size	Turnout	PP	PSPV	EUPV	UV	Bloc–EV	Lead
2003 municipal election	25 May 2003	—N/a	68.5	51.2; 19	30.8; 12	7.3; 2	3.6; 0	2.6; 0	20.4
CIS	22 Mar–28 Apr 2003	398	80.6	49.4; 18	30.3; 11	7.5; 2	3.6; 1	4.8; 1	19.1
Vox Pública/El Periódico	25–27 Apr 2003	500	?	49.5– 50.5; 18/20	27.5– 28.5; 10/11	7.0– 8.0; 2/3	5.0– 6.0; 1/2	–	22.0
PSPV	15–25 Apr 2003	920	68.7	? 16	? 14	? 3	–	–	5.5
Celeste-Tel/PSPV	27 Jan–4 Feb 2003	804	?	50.5	37.5	–	–	–	13.0
2000 general election	12 Mar 2000	—N/a	71.1	54.7 (20)	28.8 (11)	7.3 (2)	3.6 (0)	2.0 (0)	25.9
1999 municipal election	13 Jun 1999	—N/a	62.7	53.2; 20	29.0; 11	6.4; 2	4.7; 0	3.2; 0	24.2

=== Voting preferences ===
The table below lists raw, unweighted voting preferences.

Polling firm/Commissioner	Fieldwork date	Sample size	PP	PSPV	EUPV	UV	Bloc–EV	Question	X mark	Lead
2003 municipal election	25 May 2003	—N/a	34.9	21.1	5.0	2.5	1.8	—N/a	31.5	13.8
CIS	22 Mar–28 Apr 2003	398	40.5	26.6	5.0	1.8	1.8	14.3	6.5	13.9
2000 general election (Note: Does not include non-resident citizens.)	12 Mar 2000	—N/a	38.7	20.4	5.2	2.5	1.4	—N/a	28.9	18.3
1999 municipal election	13 Jun 1999	—N/a	33.3	18.1	4.0	3.0	2.0	—N/a	37.3	15.2

== Results ==
← Summary of the 25 May 2003 City Council of Valencia election results →
Parties and alliances	Popular vote			Seats	
Parties and alliances	Votes	%	±pp	Total	+/−
People's Party (PP)	220,548	51.15	−2.10	19	−1
Socialist Party of the Valencian Country (PSPV–PSOE)	132,903	30.82	+1.87	12	+1
United Left–Valencian Left: Agreement (L'Entesa)	31,519	7.31	+0.94	2	±0
Valencian Union (UV)	15,593	3.62	−1.12	0	±0
Valencian Nationalist Bloc–Green Left (Bloc–EV)	11,201	2.60	−0.61	0	±0
Cannabis Party for Legalisation and Normalisation (PCLyN)	4,177	0.97	New	0	±0
The Greens of the Valencian Country (EV–LV)	3,369	0.78	New	0	±0
Spain 2000 (E–2000)	819	0.19	New	0	±0
Family and Life Party (PFyV)	732	0.17	New	0	±0
Republican Left of the Valencian Country–Municipal Agreement (ERPV–AM)	692	0.16	New	0	±0
Alternative Citizen Initiative (ICAL)	532	0.12	New	0	±0
Regional Party of the Valencian Community (PRCV)	509	0.12	New	0	±0
Democratic and Social Centre (CDS)	461	0.11	−0.03	0	±0
Federal Republican Party (PRF)	441	0.10	−0.02	0	±0
Internationalist Socialist Workers' Party (POSI)	354	0.08	New	0	±0
Humanist Party (PH)	300	0.07	−0.02	0	±0
Blank ballots	7,007	1.63	−0.22		
Total	431,157			33	±0
Valid votes	431,157	99.72	+0.08		
Invalid votes	1,209	0.28	−0.08		
Votes cast / turnout	432,366	68.50	+5.78		
Abstentions	198,859	31.50	−5.78		
Registered voters	631,225				

Popular vote
PP	51.15%
PSPV–PSOE	30.82%
L'Entesa	7.31%
UV	3.62%
Bloc–EV	2.60%
Others	2.87%
Blank ballots	1.63%

Seats
PP	57.58%
PSPV–PSOE	36.36%
L'Entesa	6.06%

== Aftermath ==
=== Government formation ===
Investiture
Ballot →	14 June 2003	
Required majority →	17 out of 33	
Rita Barberá (PP): • PP (19)	19 / 33	check
Rafael Rubio (PSPV): • PSPV (12)	12 / 33	X mark
Antonio Montalbán (L'Entesa): • L'Entesa (2)	2 / 33	X mark
Abstentions/Blank ballots	0 / 33	
Absentees	0 / 33	

== Bibliography ==
- Constitución Española (Constitution). Official State Gazette (in Spanish). 27 December 1978 [version as of 28 August 1992]. BOE-A-1978-31229.
- Ley 7/1985, de 2 de abril, Reguladora de las Bases del Régimen Local (Law 7/1985). Official State Gazette (in Spanish). 2 April 1985 [version as of 11 March 2003]. BOE-A-1985-5392.
- Ley Orgánica 5/1985, de 19 de junio, del Régimen Electoral General (Organic Law 5/1985). Official State Gazette (in Spanish). 19 June 1985 [version as of 11 March 2003]. BOE-A-1985-11672.
- Real Decreto 374/2003, de 31 de marzo, por el que se convocan elecciones locales y a las Asambleas de Ceuta y Melilla (Royal Decree 374/2003). Official State Gazette (in Spanish). 31 March 2003. BOE-A-2003-6489.
