= Inmaculada Rodríguez-Piñero =

Spanish politician

Inmaculada Rodríguez-Piñero MEP
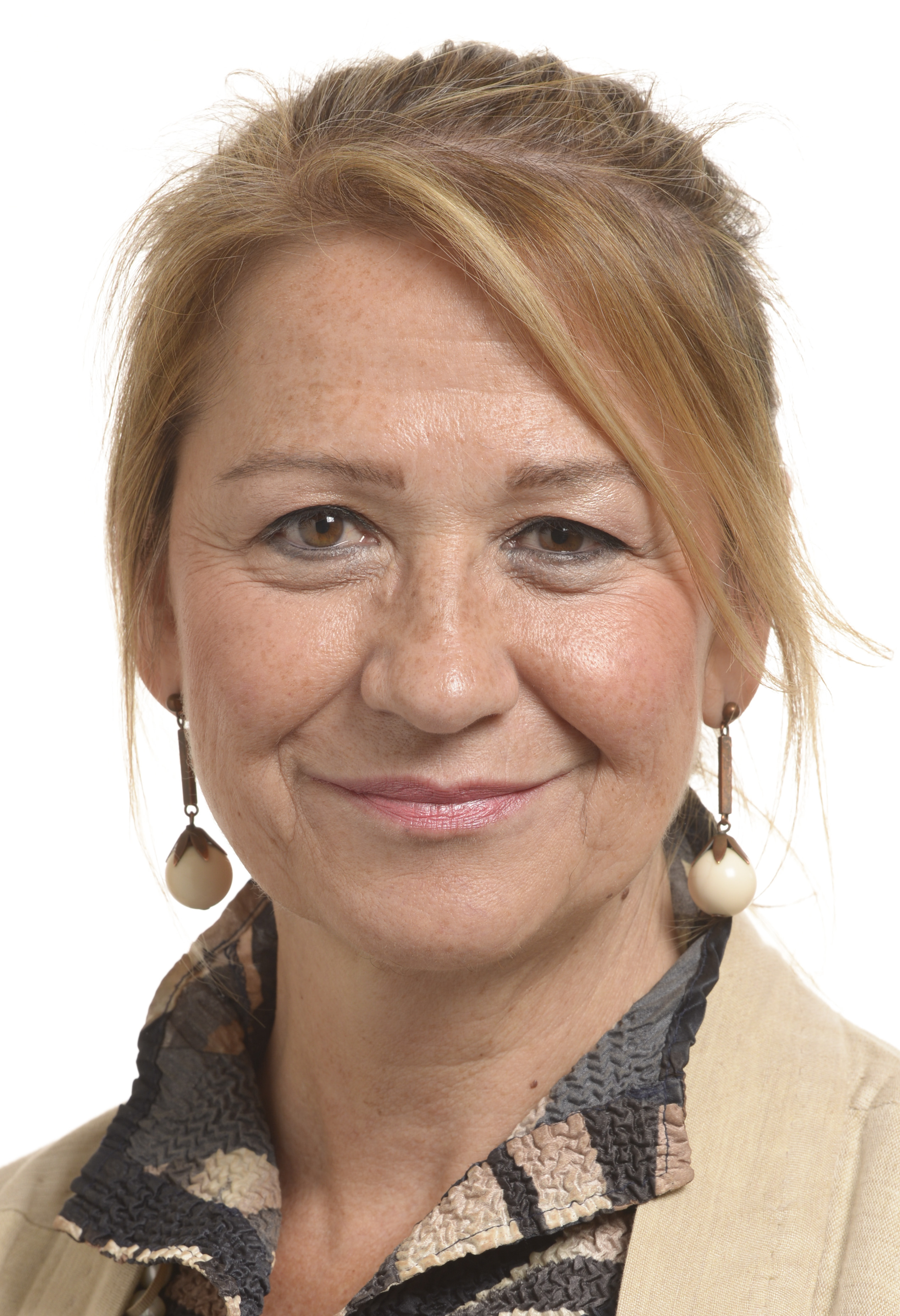

Member of the European Parliament
- Incumbent
- Assumed office 1 July 2014
- Constituency: Spain

Member of the Congress of Deputies
- In office 13 December 2011 – 1 July 2014
- Constituency: Valencia
- In office 9 March 2008 – 19 April 2009
- Constituency: Valencia

Secretary of Economic Policies and Employment of PSOE
- In office 5 February 2012 – 27 July 2014
- Preceded by: Octavio Granado
- Succeeded by: Manuel Vázquez (Economy); Maria Luz Fernández (Employment)

Secretary-General of Infrastructure
- In office 18 April 2009 – 14 October 2011
- Prime Minister: José Luis Rodríguez Zapatero
- Preceded by: José Damián Santiago
- Succeeded by: José Damián Santiago

Personal details
- Born: Inmaculada Rodríguez-Piñero Fernández; 7 January 1958 (age 68) Madrid, Spain
- Party: Spanish Socialist Workers' Party
- Other political affiliations: Socialist Party of the Valencian Country-PSOE; Progressive Alliance of Socialists and Democrats
- Education: University of Minnesota; University of Valencia; Grenoble Alpes University
- Occupation: Economist, politician

Inmaculada Rodríguez-Piñero Fernández (pronounced [immakuˈlaða roˈðɾiɣeθ piˈɲeɾo]; born 7 January 1958, in Madrid) is a Spanish politician for the Spanish Socialist Workers' Party (PSOE). Married with two children, she earned a master's degree in economic theory from the University of Minnesota and served as economic and employment spokesperson for the PSOE.

== Role in national politics ==
In 2008, Rodríguez-Piñero was selected as second placed candidate on the PSOE list for Valencia province and was consequently elected to the Spanish national parliament.

On 16 April 2009 Rodríguez-Piñero was named State Secretary for Infrastructure and Planning by the Minister of Public Works José Blanco López in the government of Prime Minister José Luis Rodríguez Zapatero. She subsequently resigned her parliamentary seat. In her capacity as State Secretary, she served as ex-officio member of the board of the Sociedad Estatal de Infraestructuras del Transporte Terrestre (SEIIT).

== Member of the European Parliament, 2014–2024 ==
Rodríguez-Piñero was a Member of the European Parliament from the 2014 European elections until 2024. She served on the Committee on International Trade. from 2019 to 2024, she was part of the Democracy Support and Election Coordination Group (DEG), which oversees the Parliament's election observation missions.

In addition to her committee assignments, Rodríguez-Piñero was part of the parliament's delegation to the EU-Chile Joint Parliamentary Committee. She was also a member of the European Parliament Intergroup on Long-Term Investment and Reindustrialization, the European Parliament Intergroup on Disability and the Spinelli Group.

Political offices
Preceded by José Damián Santiago	Secretary-General of Infrastructure; 2009–2011	Succeeded by Jose Damián Santiago
Party political offices
Preceded by Octavio Granado	Secretary of Economic Policies and Employment of PSOE; 2012–2014	Succeeded by Manuel Vázquez as Secretary of Economy
Preceded by Octavio Granado	Secretary of Economic Policies and Employment of PSOE; 2012–2014	Succeeded by María Luz Fernández as Secretary of Employment
