= IESIDE Business Institute =

- Type: Private business school
- Established: 1987; 39 years ago
- President: Miguel Ángel Escotet
- Students: 5,347
- Location: Ronda de Nelle, 31. C.P. 15007 A Coruña - Rúa Augusto González Besada, 2. C.P 36001 Pontevedra - Avda. Madrid, 60• C.P. 36204 Vigo, Vigo, A Coruña, Pontevedra and Ourense, Spain
- Campus: Urban
- Website: www.ieside.edu

IESIDE Business Institute is a private business school located in Vigo, Spain, established in 1987.

== History ==
Since its foundation linked to the Galician bank ABANCA, IESIDE Business School has contributed to the economic development of the euroregion Galicia-Northern Portugal. In 2009, it became an associated school of the University of Vigo.

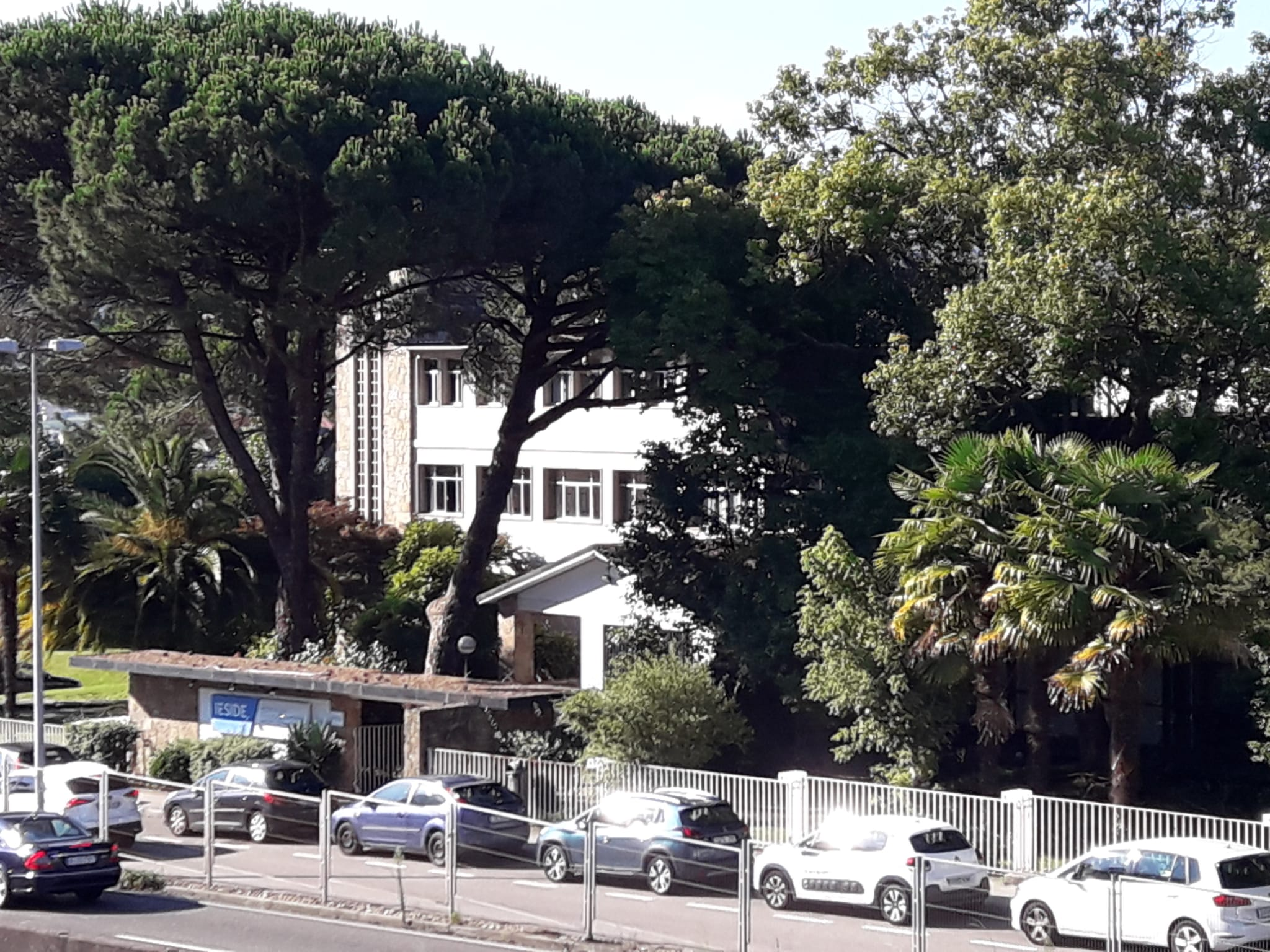
IESIDE in Vigo.

== Academic programs ==
IESIDE Business School has multiple exchange programs for teachers and students, mainly in the US, UK, and Mexico.

== Accreditation ==
The institute is a member of the European Foundation for Management Development (EFMD).
