= Ana Pardo de Vera =

Spanish journalist (born 1974)

- Ana Pardo de Vera Posada
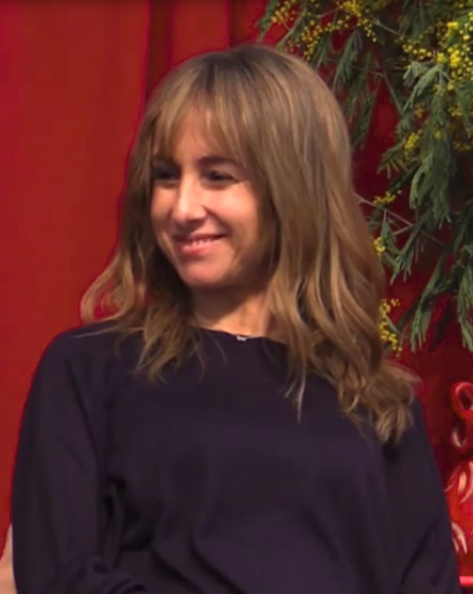
- Born: 1974 (age 51–52); Lugo, Spain
- Education: Spanish Philology
- Alma mater: National University of Distance Education
- Occupations: Journalist, writer
- Writing career
- Language: Spanish
- Genre: Non-Fiction
- Notable work: En la maleta de Zapatero

Ana Pardo de Vera Posada (born 1974) is a Spanish journalist. Since 2016, she has been the chief editor of the online newspaper Público.

== Biography ==
Born in Lugo, Galicia, Pardo de Vera is a graduate in Spanish Philology, has a master's degree in Communication and Media studies, and has studied Political Science and Sociology at the National University of Distance Education. She has written in several media such as Diario 16, La Voz de Galicia, Tiempo and El Siglo de Europa and has collaborated in various radio and television shows. In 2007 she helped found the newspaper Público.

During José Luis Rodríguez Zapatero's government, she was a communication advisor for the Ministries of Defence, Industry, Tourism and Commerce and the Vice-Presidency of Territorial Policy. Her sister Isabel, younger by one year, is an engineer.

== Books ==
- En la maleta de Zapatero (2013).
