= Lluís Brines i Garcia =

Catalan researcher

Lluís Brines i Garcia (or Luis Brines García in Spanish) (Barcelona, 1971) is a Catalan researcher, whose paternal family comes from Simat de la Valldigna (Valencia). He is the son of the musician Lluís Brines Selfa. He has lived in the Valencian Country since 1989. He is a specialist in Francesc Eiximenis, about whom he wrote his doctoral dissertation. He is the creator of the catalanist website Antiblavers and was its administrator until 2011. He is also Franciscan tertiary.

== Research ==
Lluís Brines' main research line has been Francesc Eiximenis' thought and works.

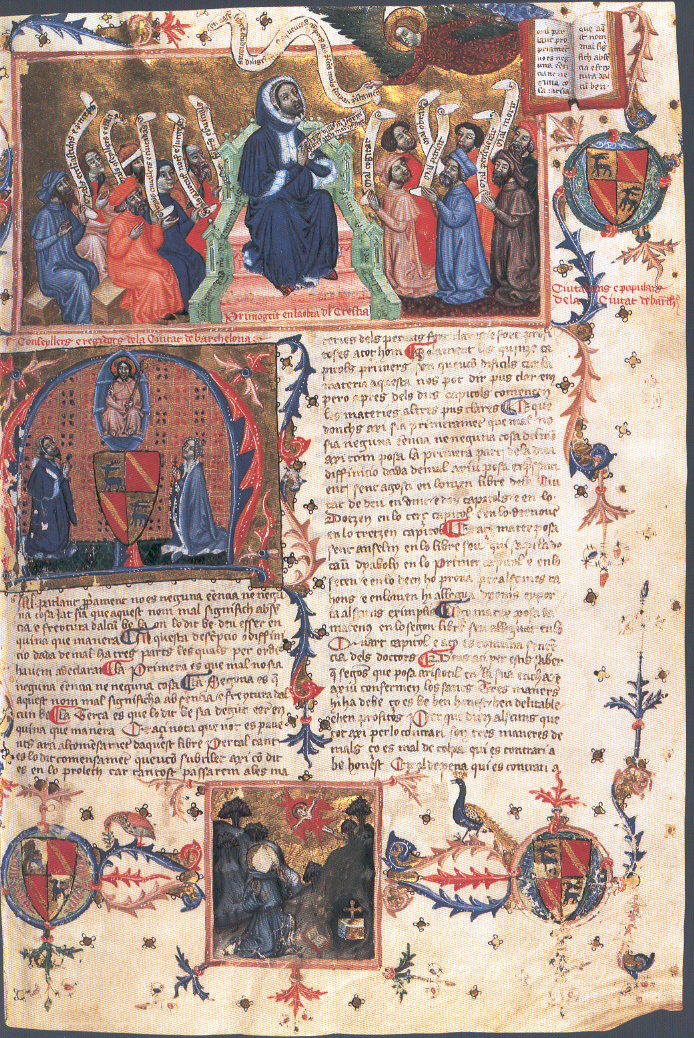
Beginning of the Terç del Crestià in the manuscript 1792 from the National Library of Madrid.

Lluís Brines' research about Francesc Eiximenis began with his doctoral dissertation, after getting his degree in Law in the University of Valencia. This task took him 4 years (1998–2002). The original title of this dissertation was La filosofia política i jurídica de Francesc Eiximenis (Francesc Eiximenis' Political and Legal Philosophy). It analyzes Francesc Eiximenis' works and thought from a social, political, economic and only in some respect, in spite of the title, legal point of view. It deals specially with the theological Franciscan thought and its presence in Eiximenis' work. It deals as well with eschatological matters and prophetism. This doctoral dissertation was published, with some additions, in 2004, now with the title of La Filosofia Social i Política de Francesc Eiximenis (Francesc Eiximenis' Social and Political Philosophy). It was reprinted in the review Estudios Franciscanos (Franciscan Studies) between 2006 and 2007 (with an enlargement of a short biography of Francesc Eiximenis).

Later Brines wrote in 2009, owing to a grant that was given by the Acadèmia Valenciana de la Llengua (Valencian Language Academy) a Biografia documentada de Francesc Eiximenis (Francesc Eiximenis' documented biography). The book was finally published in 2018.

In 2009 he worked together with philologist Josep Palomero in an edition with modern language of Francesc Eiximenis' classical book Regiment de la cosa pública (Government of the Republic).

His latest research on Eiximenis has deepened in the theological aspects of Eiximenis' thought, and the result of it is the article Tendències de pensament franciscà en Francesc Eiximenis (Tendencies of Franciscan thought in Francesc Eiximenis), which was published in the EF in 2014.

In 2015 he contributed to a collective tribute to the Swiss-Canadian Eiximenis researcher Curt Wittlin, whose title is "Eiximenis i la ciència" (Eiximenis and science).

One of his last research lines has been Ramon Llull's thought, specially the theological side of it within the Franciscan thought. Since year 2016 is the 800th anniversary of Llull's death, Brines has written the article whose title is Tendències franciscanes en Ramon Llull (Ramon Llull's Franciscan tendencies), which has been published also in the EF in a special issue about this Majorcan author.

In 2019 he wrote an obituary for Professors Curt Wittlin, who died on 23 September that year, and David Viera, who had previously died on 11 September 2015. Both Professors had had a very important role in the research about Francesc Eiximenis. The obituary was finally published in 2020 in Spanish. A version in Catalan was also published. Versions in Catalan and in English appeared also that year in the website of the North-American Catalan Society. A short version in German appeared also in 2020.

Since 2017 he collaborates with the Biographisch-Bibliographisches Kirchenlexikon (BBKL), which is a digital encyclopedia in German language about Christian persons related to the history of the church, philosophy and literature. In this encyclopedia, together with a biography of the person, there is a selection of bibliography and secondary literature about this person. The selected people stem from the fields of Christian theology, history, literature, music, painting, pedagogy and philosophy. Articles in English are published also in this encyclopedia, but only in the online edition.

== Antiblavers project ==
Lluís Brines was the ideologist and creator of the website antiblavers, whose main aim was to fight in a scientific and serious way against Blaverism. Other collaborators took care of the informatic matters.

At the end of 2004 a group of people around the Valencian Community was very concerned about the fact that there were many Blaverist websites, such as www.elpalleter.com, www.valenciafreedom.com or www.llenguavalencianasi.com. Moreover, these websites were very aggressive and offered a biased point of view. So they had the aim of creating a serious and scientific tool in order to fight against Blaverism. This is the way that www.antiblavers.info was born in May 2005. In the beginning the website offered only information, with a part of research materials and a gallery of images. During its first year it achieved 35,000 visits. After some time, in August 2006, a forum was added.

One of the most important milestones of the website during its first years was the gathering of old and modern evidences of the flag with four red stripes in Valencian territory. This way in February 2010 there were already 2100 evidences that had been gathered. In the research that lead to the report about the historicity of the flag with four red stripes in Valencian territory, the creators of this website had the personal advising of the prestigious Valencian heraldist Pere Maria Orts i Bosch.

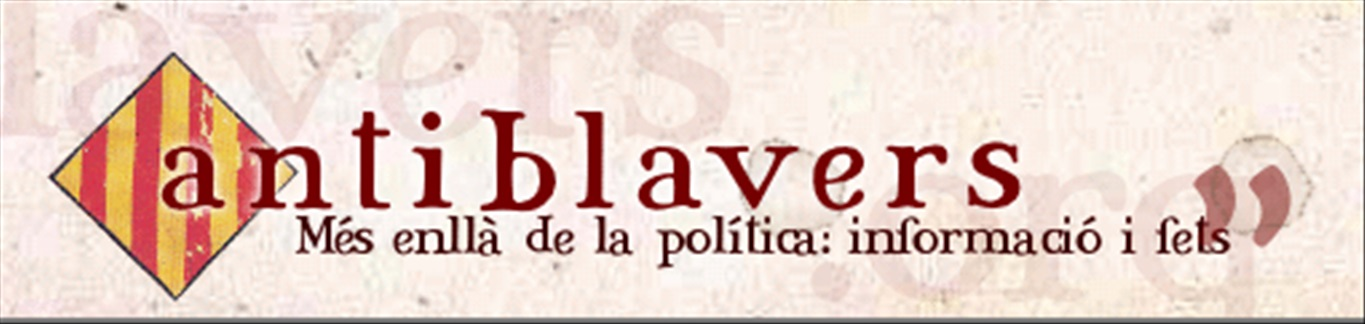
Logo de la web antiblavers.org

At the end of 2010 the website creators suffered an outrageous attack campaign that was made by the Blaverists, who were very upset by the task of telling the historical truth and of fighting them that this website was doing. Maybe one thing that made Blaverists very upset was the success of the campaign that was done by the website antiblavers, in collaboration with the antifeixistes website in order to avoid the presence of the GAV (Group of Valencianist Action) in the Christmas fair Expojove during the Christmas of 2010. As they acknowledged themselves, Expojove was the main attraction point for new members of the GAV.

As a result of these immoderate attacks, in 2011 Lluís Brines ceased to be the main administrator of the website, and other people began to do this task, even though he collaborated from time to time. Moreover, the project was divided into two websites:

- antiblavers.org – The main website, that has most of the information and a debate forum.
- antiblavers.net – It used in the beginning the first name of the website, before the project was divided into two websites, www.antiblavers.info. Some years later the name was changed again, and it became www.antiblavers.net. Nowadays it is a blog, whose content is varied and dynamic.

== Blaverist threats and attacks ==
The first important Blaverist attack against Lluís Brines took place in December 2010, when in his old address in Valencia some graffiti appeared with his name and surname and the words "paederast" and "paedophile". These insults against him were constantly repeated in the website www.valenciafreedom.com, which is linked with the GAV. The graffiti was allegedly made by the former co-president of the Youths of the GAV (JJGAV) Aitor Alan Marquina Bañuls.

A bit later, in January 2011, other graffitis appeared in Simat de la Valldigna (Safor), the village of Brines' paternal family, where he was also called "paederast" and "paedophile".

Finally, in November 2012 another graffiti appeared in the address of Valencia that was used by Lluís Brines as the address for court notifications. This graffiti consisted in Brines' name and surnames, a bull's eye and it was signed by the anagram 71, which is the one that the GAV uses (7 is the place of letter G inside the alphabet, and 1 is the place of letter A).

The three graffitis were denounced by Lluís Brines, but this kind of graffitis are seldom (or never) investigated in Spain, and these three matters were filed by the legal authorities.

Furthermore, in the Blaverist and far-right website valenciafreedom there is a permanent thread, allegedly opened by the above-mentioned (who uses the pseudonyms of paco1983 and nandivirus in that website), where Lluís Brines receives all kinds of insults and slanders. was finally condemned in 2018 to pay a fine of 600 €, and since then he ceased to attack Lluís Brines and even to write in the Blaverist and far-right website valenciafreedom.

== Publications ==
=== Books ===
- La filosofia social i política de Francesc Eiximenis (Francesc Eiximenis' Social and Political Philosophy). Sevilla. Ed. Novaedició. 2004. 653. ISBN 84-609-0477-6 (in Catalan)

It was reprinted in the review Estudios Franciscanos (Franciscan Studies), with the addition of a short biography of Francesc Eiximenis, in four parts: 1st part: EF Vol. 107 nº 440. January–August 2006. 41-232. 2nd part: EF Vol. 107 nº 441. September–December 2006. 303–495. 3rd part: EF Vol. 108 nº 442. January–August 2007. 41–134. 4th part: EF Vol. 108 nº 443. September–December 2007. 279–420.

- Biografia documentada de Francesc Eiximenis (Francesc Eiximenis' documented biography). Valencia. T-Ink Factoría de Color. 2018. 516. ISBN 978-84-09-02280-9 (in Catalan)

=== Parts of books ===
- "Orígens medievals del federalisme. Unitat religiosa i diversitat política en el Primer del Crestià de Francesc Eiximenis" (Mediaeval Origins of federalism. Religious unity and political diversity in Francesc Eiximenis' Primer del Crestià). Inside Vida amunt i nacions amunt (Life upwards and nations upwards). Valencia. University of Valencia. 2008. Pp. 33–51. ISBN 978-84-370-7213-5 (in Catalan)
- Eiximenis, Francesc. Regiment de la cosa pública. Alzira. Editorial Bromera. 2009. 250. Language adaptation to modern Valencian by Josep Palomero. Introduction and footnotes by Lluís Brines. ISBN 978-84-9824-449-6 (in Catalan)
- "Francesc Eiximenis (OFM, † 1409). Su vida, su obra en catalán" (Francesc Eiximenis (OFM, † 1409). His life, his works in Catalan language). Inside Estudios de latín medieval hispánico (Acts of the V Congress of Mediaeval Hispanic Latin. Barcelona, 7–10 September 2009). Firenze. Sismel – Edizioni del Galluzzo. 2011. 317–326. ISBN 978-88-8450-429-6 (in Spanish)
- "Eiximenis i la ciència" (Eiximenis and science). Inside Studia Mediaevalia Curt Wittlin dicata / Mediaeval Studies in Honour Curt Wittlin / Estudis medievals en homenatge a Curt Wittlin. Alicante. IIFV. 2015. 67–79. ISBN 978-84-606-8839-6 (in Catalan)

=== Articles ===
- "Tendències de pensament franciscà en Francesc Eiximenis" (Tendencies of Franciscan thought in Francesc Eiximenis). EF. V. 115 nº 456. January–August 2014. 1–33. (in Catalan)
- "Tendències franciscanes en Ramon Llull" (Ramon Llull's Franciscan tendencies). EF. V. 117 nº 461. September–December 2016. 437–468. (in Catalan)
- Article about Francesc Eiximenis in BBKL. A first version of the article appeared on line in 2017. It was published also that year in Volume 38 (columns 390-395). An improved version was published on line in 2020. It was published in 2021 in Volume 42 (Columns 322-335). (in German)
- "Homenatge a David Viera ( † 2015) i Curt Wittlin ( † 2019)". BSCC, XCV. V. I. January–December 2019. 145-166. (in Catalan)
- "David Viera († 2015) y Curt Wittlin († 2019). In memoriam". REHIPIP, 14. December 2019-February 2020. 123-142. (in Spanish)
- "David Viera († 2015) y Curt Wittlin († 2019). In memoriam". EF Vol. 121 nº 468. January–August 2020. 167-197. (in Spanish)
- "Curt Wittlin († 2019) in memoriam". ZfK, 33. 2020. 361-367. (in German)
- Article about Arnaldus de Villa Nova in BBKL. It was published on line in 2020. It was published in 2021 in Volume 42 (Columns 42-52). (in German)
- Article about Antoni Canals in BBKL. It was published on line in 2020. It was published in 2021 in Volume 42 (Columns 235-241). (in German)
- Article about Richard Kilvington in BBKL. It was published on line in 2020. It was published in 2021 in Volume 42 (Columns 797-802). (in German)
- Article about Thomas of Ireland in BBKL. It was published on line in 2020. It was published in 2021 in Volume 42 (Columns 1442-1444) (in German)
- Article about Isabel de Villena in BBKL. It was published on line in 2021. It was published in 2021 in Volume 43 (Columns 849-864) (in German)
- Article about William Perault in BBKL. It was published on line in 2021. It was published in 2021 in Volume 43 (Columns 1120-1126) (in German)
- Article about Richard de Bury in BBKL. It was published on line in 2021. It was published in 2021 in Volume 43 (Columns 1337-1345) (in German)
- Article about Albertanus of Brescia in BBKL. It was published on line in 2021. It was published in 2022 in Volume 44 (Columns 56-66). (in German)
- Article about John Dumbleton in BBKL. It was published on line in 2022. It was published in 2022 in Volume 44 in 2022 (Columns 351-354). (in German)
- Article about Richard Swineshead in BBKL. It was published on line in 2022. It was published in 2022 in Volume 44 (Columns 1307-1314). (in German)
- Article about Pseudo-Bonaventure in BBKL. It was published on line in 2022. It was published in 2023 in Volume 45 (Columns 1153-1156). (in German)
- Article about Joan Roís de Corella in BBKL. It was published on line in 2022. It was published in 2023 in Volume 45 (Columns 1231-1254). (in German)
- Article about Henry Totting of Oyta in BBKL. It was published on line in 2023. It was published in Volume 46 (Columns 623-628) in 2023. (in German)
- Article about Ubertin of Casale in BBKL. It was published on line in 2023. It was published in Volume 46 (Columns 1363-1380) in 2023. (in German)
- Article about Bernat de Puigcercós in BBKL. It was published on line in 2023. It was published in Volume 47 (Columns 100-104) in 2024. (in German)
- Article about Maria de Luna in BBKL. It was published on line in 2023. It was published in Volume 47 in 2024 (Columns 1042-1047). (in German)
- Article about Joan Botam in BBKL. It was published on line in 2024. It was published in Volume 48 in 2025 (Columns 208-210). (in German)
- Article about Brunetto Latini in BBKL. It was published on line in 2024. It was published in Volume 48 in 2025 (Columns 952-969). (in German)
- Article about Mary of Sicily in BBKL. It was published on line in 2024. It was published in Volume 48 in 2025 (Columns 1021-1023). (in German)
- Article about Thomas de Cantilupe in BBKL. It was published on line in 2024. It is due to be published in Volume 49 in 2025. (in German)
- Article about Peter IV of Aragon in BBKL. It was published on line in 2025. It is due to be published in Volume 49 in 2025. (in German)
- Article about Adam Marsh in BBKL. It was published on line in 2025. It is due to be published in Volume 49 in 2025. (in German)
- Article about Vincent of Beauvais in BBKL. It was published on line in 2025. It is due to be published in Volume 49 in 2026. (in German)
- Article about Frederic Raurell in BBKL. It was published on line in 2025. It is due to be published in Volume 50 in 2026/2027. (in German)
- Article about Guiu Terrena in BBKL. It was published on line in 2026. It is due to be published in Volume 50 in 2026/2027. (in German)
- Article about Lluís Dalmau in BBKL. It was published on line in 2026. It is due to be published in Volume 51 in 2026/2027. (in German)
- Article about Francis of Meyronnes in BBKL. It was published on line in 2026. It is due to be published in Volume 51 in 2026/2027. (in German)
- Article about Lluís Amigó in BBKL. It was published on line in 2026. It is due to be published in Volume 51 in 2028. (in German)

=== Online articles ===
- "David Viera († 2015) i Curt Wittlin († 2019). In memoriam". NACS website. 2020. (in Catalan)
- "David Viera († 2015) and Curt Wittlin († 2019). In memoriam". NACS website. 2020. (in English)
- Montserrat i el País Valencià (Montserrat and the Valencian Country). Institut de la nova Història website. 2020. (in Catalan)
- Article in English language about Francesc Eiximenis in BBKL. It appeared only in the online edition of this encyclopedia in 2022.
- L'Armorial de Gelre i la Corona d'Aragó (The Gelre Armorial and the Crown of Aragon. Institut de la nova Història website. 2022. (in Catalan)
- Article in English language about Arnaldus de Villa Nova in BBKL. It appeared only in the online edition of this encyclopedia in 2023.
- Article in English language about Joan Botam in BBKL. It appeared only in the online edition of this encyclopedia in 2024.
- Article in English language about Isabel de Villena in BBKL. It appeared only in the online edition of this encyclopedia in 2025.
- Article in English language about Joan Roís de Corella in BBKL. It appeared only in the online edition of this encyclopedia in 2026.

=== Book reviews ===
- Review of Sebastian Roebert's Die Königin im Zentrum der Macht: Reginale Herrschaft in der Krone Aragón am Beispiel Eleonores von Sizilien (1349-1375) in Speculum (January 2023, Vol. 98, number 1, 324-326). (in English)
- Review of Alexander Fidora's Die Regierung des Gemeinwesens in Estudios Franciscanos (January-August 2024, Volume 125, Number 476, 371-376). (in Catalan)
- Review of Alexander Fidora's Die Regierung des Gemeinwesens in Archivo Iberoamericano (Vol. 84, Number 299, 905-916). (in Spanish)
- Review of Alexander Fidora's Die Regierung des Gemeinwesens in Zeitschrift für Katalanistik (2025, Vol. 38, 471-477). (in Catalan)
