= Psalterium alias Laudatorium =

15th-century work by Francesc Eiximenis

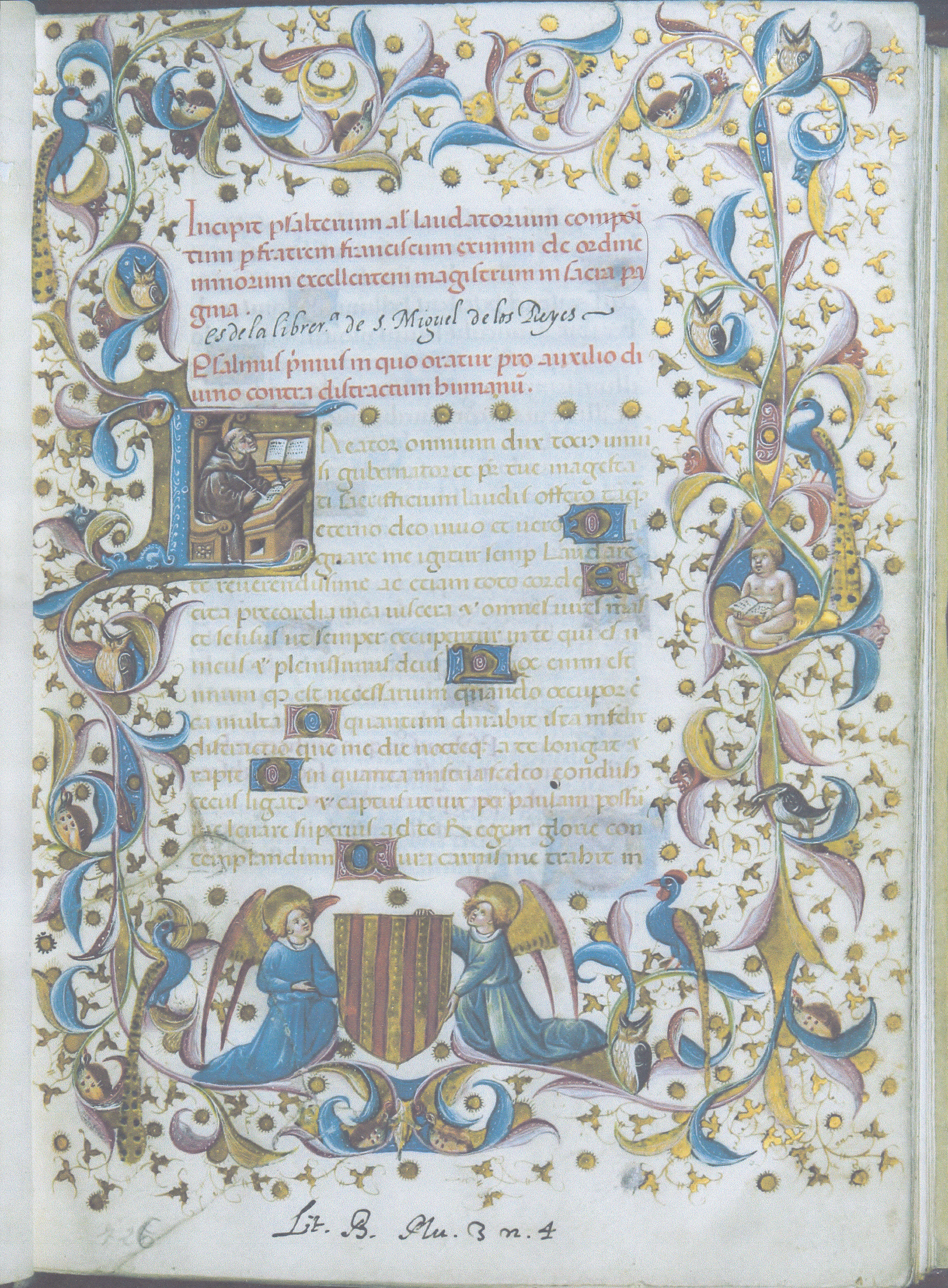
Beginning of Francesc Eiximenis' Psalterium alias Laudatorium according to the manuscript 726 of the Historical Library of the University of Valencia

The Psalterium alias laudatorium (Psalter or Doxology) is a literary work that was written by Francesc Eiximenis in Latin between 1404 and 1408 in Valencia. It consists of a collection of prayers, and was dedicated to the Pope of Avignon Benedict XIII.

== Structure and content ==
The book has three hundred forty-four prayers, that are divided into three cycles of contemplative prayers: De laude creatoris (On the praise of the Creator), De vita et excellentia redemptoris (On the life and excellency of the Redeemer) and De vita et ordinatione hominis viatoris (On the life and order of the man in the world).

As Albert Hauf has pointed out, this work and the Vida de Jesucrist form a unity of literary creation, and the only thing that changes is the style. This way, as Hauf himself states, the Psalterium takes a different style from that of the Vida de Jesucrist for the same basic content.

== Origin ==
Between 1404 and 1408, Francesc Eiximenis was writing a beautiful collection of prayers in Latin that is known as Psalterium alias Laudatorium (Psalter or Doxology). The first ones of these prayers were dedicated to Berenguer de Ribalta, when he was appointed bishop of Tarazona in 1404. The final and definitive collection was dedicated to Pero de Luna, the Aragonese Pope of Avignon Benedict XIII.

Even though Benedict XIII maybe had interest for this work already in 1405, as a document dated in Barcelona on 11 August 1405 shows, it is quite probable that the final collection were offered by Eiximenis to pope Benedict XIII when he went to the Council of Perpignan in November 1408. It has been suggested that the good impression that the book made to the pope influenced in the fact of getting Eiximenis his two last important positions: patriarch of Jerusalem and apostolic administrator (interim bishop) of the diocese of Elna (old name of the diocese of Perpignan).

== Translations ==
There is a partial translation of one hundred prayers into Catalan that was made in 1416 by Guillem Fontana, and that was printed in Gerona on 20 March 1495 by Diego de Gumiel.

== Digital editions ==
=== Manuscripts ===
- Edition in Somni (Digitalized collection of the old books of the University of Valencia) of the manuscript 726 of the Historical Library of the University of Valencia. It was made in 1442-3 by Pere Bonora and Lleonard Crespí (miniaturists) and Domènec Sala (bookbinder). It comes from the Alfonso the Magnanimous' and the Duke of Calabria's library.

=== Incunabula ===
- Edition in the Memòria Digital de Catalunya (Digital Memory of Catalonia) of the incunabulum edition of the Guillem Fontana's Psaltiri devotíssim (partial translation into Catalan), that was printed by Diego de Gumiel (Gerona, 20 March 1495).

=== Modern editions ===
- Edition of the Psalterium alias Laudatorium inside Eiximenis' complete works (Psalterium alias Laudatorium Papae Benedicto XIII dedicatum. Toronto. Pontifical Institute of Mediaeval Studies. 1988. 307. Edition and introduction by Curt Wittlin).

=== The Psalterium alias Laudatorium inside Eiximenis' complete works ===
- Francesc Eiximenis' complete works (in Catalan and in Latin).
