= Doctrina compendiosa =

The Doctrina Compendiosa (Global Doctrine) is a literary work about political matters that is attributed to Francesc Eiximenis and was written in Catalan in Valencia between the end of the 14th century and the beginning of the 15th century. The Capuchin Martí de Barcelona published it in 1929.

== Content and structure ==
The book has the form of a dialog, in which a group of Valencia citizens ask several questions to a Franciscan about social and political matters, and even about morality and religion. The friar divides the dialog into two parts. The first one, that consists in twenty chapters, deals specially with morality. The second one, that consists in other twenty chapters, deals with practical matters, specially about social and political ones. And the book ends with a final conclusion.

== Reasons against Eiximenis' authorship ==
Nevertheless, some works of Jaume Riera Sans and Curt Wittlin have proved that Eiximenis was not the author of this book.

The main reasons would be the following ones:

- Eiximenis never wrote any other book with the form of a dialog.
- Six of the nine preserved manuscripts do not have the name of the author.
- The author of this work does not make any other internal reference to the Eiximenis' works, as he used to do in his works.
- There are few quotations of the Bible and of the Church Fathers and Doctors of the Church.
- The way of making quotations in Latin in this work is totally different from the rest of Eiximenis' works.

== Possible author ==
Curt Wittlin suggests that the author of this work could be Ramon Soler, who was a jurist and important citizen of Valencia, and also a close friend of Francesc Eiximenis. Therefore, this work would be a kind of reminder of the doctrines of Eiximenis, since this book has a lot of similarities with Eiximenis' social and political thought, and with his works where he deals with those matters, such as the Regiment de la cosa pública.

Furthermore, C. Wittlin has found a lot of influence from the works of the mediaeval jurist Albertanus of Brescia. It would support the theory that the author was a jurist, like Ramon Soler was.
