= Pastorale (Eiximenis) =

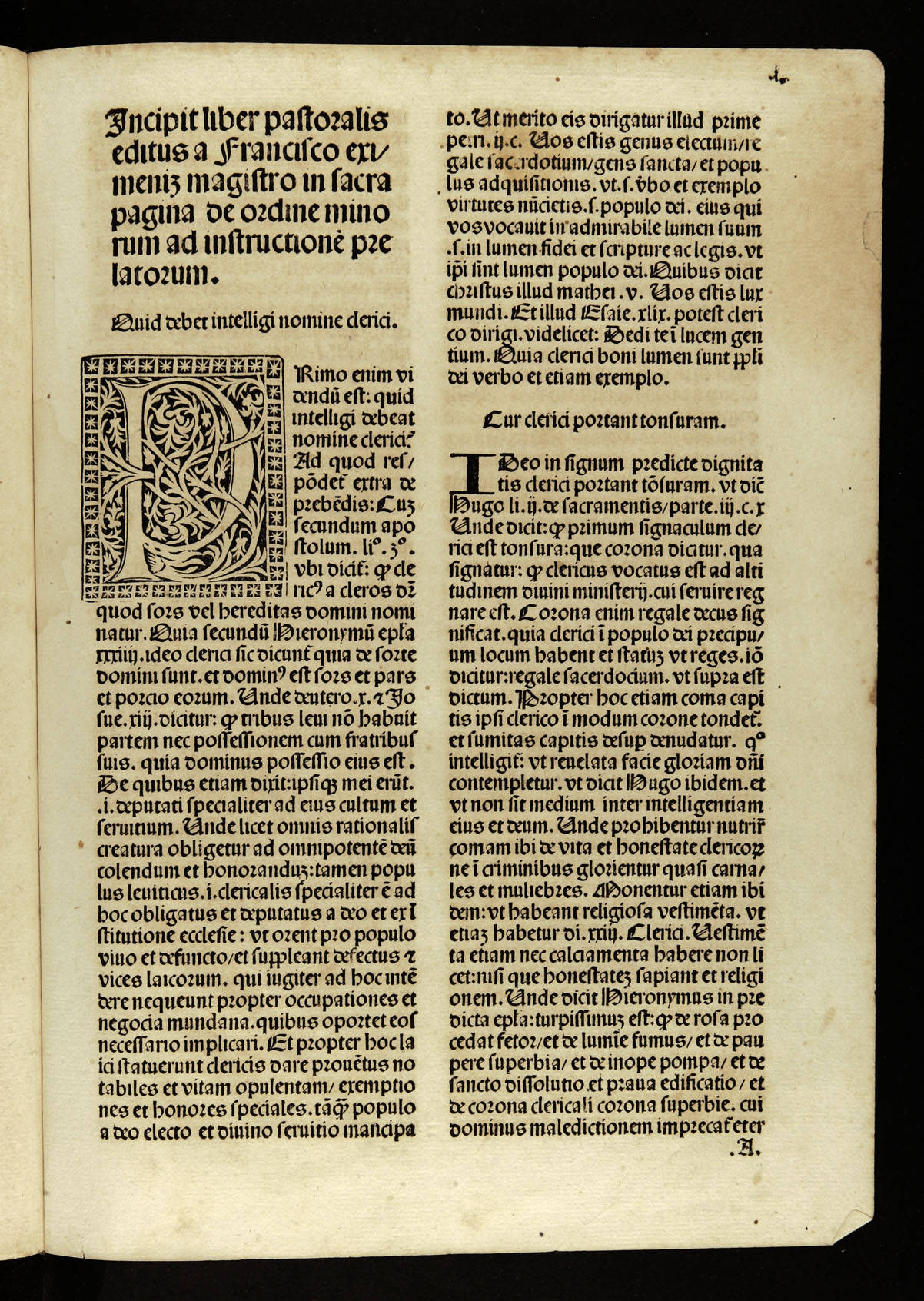
Beginning of the incunabulum edition of Francesc Eiximenis' Pastorale that was printed in Barcelona by Pere Posa on 5 December 1495

The Pastorale (Pastoral) is a literary work that was written by Francesc Eiximenis in Valencia in Latin between 1397 and 1400. It was dedicated to the bishop of Valencia Hug de Llupià.

== Origin ==
The Pastorale was written for the new bishop of Valencia, Hug de Llupià i Bages at the request of Miquel de Miracle, Parson of Penàguila, as the prologue of the book states. It was possibly written when he was appointed bishop of Valencia in 1397 or 1398. On maybe when he finally came to Valencia on 9 August 1400.

== Structure and content ==
The book has one hundred sixty-seven chapters, that are divided into four parts, and it deals mainly with the duties and obligations of bishops, even though in the beginning it deals with priests in general.

This work could correspond maybe with the Onzè (eleventh volume) of Lo Crestià, that Eiximenis did not write, that should have dealt with priests. Nevertheless, if we consider that priesthood is also a sacrament, the Desè (tenth volume) of Lo Crestià should have dealt with sacraments.

This book follows the pattern of Saint Gregory the Great's Regula Pastoralis, which is a manual for the life of bishops and priests.

== Editions ==
There is an incunabulum edition that was printed in Barcelona by Pere Posa on 5 December 1495. Nonetheless, a critical edition and translation into Catalan as a doctoral dissertation has recently been made. But this doctoral dissertation has not been published and is only available on line.

Therefore, unfortunately there is no current edition of this book. However, Curt Wittlin transcribed five chapters (from part of 36 until 40) in an interesting article that analyzes Eiximenis' hidden antimonarchism and antioligarchism.

== Digital editions ==
=== Incunabula ===
- Edition in the Memòria Digital de Catalunya (Digital Memory of Catalonia) of the incunabulum edition that was printed in Barcelona by Pere Posa on 5 December 1495.

=== Modern editions ===
- Edition in Tesis doctorales en Red (Doctoral dissertations on line) of the Montserrat Martínez Checa's critical edition and translation into Catalan (Francesc Eiximenis. Pastorale. Edició i traducció. Barcelona. UAB. 1995. LXXXVII+[VIII+450] (Edition and translation)+12 (Annex)). Montserrat Martínez Checa's doctoral dissertation submitted to Professor José Martínez Gázquez in the Autonomous University of Barcelona in 1995.

=== The Pastorale inside Eiximenis' complete works ===
- Francesc Eiximenis' complete works (in Catalan and in Latin)
