= De Triplici Statu Mundi =

The De Triplici Statu Mundi (About the three states of the world) is a minor work that deals with Eschatology. It is attributed to Francesc Eiximenis and it was written in Latin between 1378 and 1379. This opuscule was transcribed and published by Albert Hauf in 1979.

== Content ==
As the title states, this work deals with the division of history of mankind in three states or ages, that would be the following ones:

- First state

Men of these state were bad and warlike, and thus God sent them several punishments for this reason: The great flood, the flight from Egypt with Moses, Sodom and Gomorrah, the golden lamb of Sinai and the punishment of God, the seizure of Aaron's priesthood by Dathan, Abiram and Korah and their death because of this fact; and finally, the destruction of Jerusalem during the time of Titus and Vespasian. The author considers that God's people during this state is the Jewish people.

- Second state

God sent punishments in this state also, but not so many as in the first state. Moreover God sent in this state in order to help the mankind Bernard of Clairvaux, Francis of Assisi and Dominic of Guzman. At the end of this state, and maybe before the end of the century when this opuscule was written (XIVth century), there will be great problems and challenges, that will be greater than the ones of the first state. Finally the Mystical Antichrist will appear, who is a very common character in medieval eschatology.

Eight features that show that it would happen are listed. The eighth one must be pointed out. This is the division of the Church during the Western Schism. Then the author of this opuscule defends the Pope of Rome Urban VI and criticises the popes of Avignon. It seems as well that some of the signs of the next coming of Mystical Antichrist are the attacks that were made to the Church by the emperors Frederick Barbarossa and Frederick II Hohenstaufen. The tasks that this Mystical Antichrist will do are commonplace in medieval eschatological thought: The conquest of the Holy Land and the conversion of infidels.

This Mystical Antichrist will be so terrible, that it will be totally similar in this respect to the final Antichrist. As a relief for mankind some behaviour rules for these last times are given. According to Albert Hauf these rules would correspond to the Regulae pro tempore persecutionis (Rules for the time of persecution), written by a different author and that were included also in other works.

- Third state

After the great tribulations that this Mystical Antichrist will bring, there will be general peace through the world and a general purgation of clergymen. In this third state only the good and chosen ones will remain. Regarding the length of this state, no answer is given. It will end with the coming of the final Antichrist, who will be defeated and killed by Christ. Soon afterwards, the Last Judgment will begin.

== Influences ==
As sources, Hildegard of Bingen, Joachim of Fiore and the hermit of Lampedusa are explicitly quoted.

In the division of the world history in three stages, and the way that this division is shown, a clear influence of Joaquim de Fiore can be seen. Therefore, for the abbot of Fiore since there are three consubstantial persons in God, similarly there are three great stages in the world history, that correspond to the Trinity. The first stage includes pre-Christian history. During this time men lived earthly, in fear and slavery. The second one, where mankind lived between blood and spirit, took place between the coming of Christ and the year 1260. After that year, according to the Calabrian abbot, people would live according to the spirit.

It could have also the influence of Arnau de Vilanova. At least the terms that are used are similar to the ones that are used in his Expositio super Apocalipsi (Exposition about the Apocalypse).

Influence of Ubertin of Casale and Peter John Olivi should be also pointed out.

== Debate about the authorship ==
Several scholars think that Francesc Eiximenis is not the author of this opuscule. Among them the following ones can be pointed out: Martí de Barcelona, Tomás Carreras Artau, or more recently Josep Perarnau

Albert Hauf was also in favour of Eiximenis' authorship of this opuscule when he transcribed it, but with some doubts. Several Franciscans were also in favour of Eiximenis' authorship of this work: Atanasio López, Andreu Ivars, Josep Pou and Pere Sanahüja It is also remarkable Pere Bohigas' opinion in favour of Eiximenis' authorship.

== Digital editions ==
- Edition in the NARPAN Electronic Library.
- Edition inside Eiximenis' complete works on line (in Catalan and Latin)
