= Allegationes =

The Allegationes (Statements) is a short memo, that was written by Francesc Eiximenis in Latin between 1398 and 1408 in Valencia. The scholar Albert Hauf transcribed and published this opuscule in 1986.

== Origin ==
Between 1398 and 1408 there was a conflict in the city of Valencia between Church and State. The origin of this conflict was the legal situation of clergymen. The Justícia of the Kingdom of Valencia (a medieval legal Valencian authority) ordered to disarm the clergymen that showed weapons publicly. The bishop of Valencia, Hug de Llupià (a close friend of Eiximenis, whom he had already dedicated his Pastorale), demanded the clergymen to be judged according to the Church laws, and asked also to collect himself the weapons that had been taken to these clergymen. There was also another conflict between the Grand Master of the Order of Montesa and the king of the Crown of Aragon. In order to solve all these conflicts, the arbitration of sixteen important people of the Kingdom of valencia was requested. Most of them were jurists, but some of them were clergymen, such as Eiximenis. The part of this verdict of arbitration that was made by Francesc Eiximenis (that must have been written before 1409, the year he died), is what we know as Allegationes.

== Content ==
This is a key document in order to know Eiximenis' theocratic ideas. The reasoning that is given here by Eiximenis is often repeated in other parts of his works, where he justifies papal theocracy, such as chapters 75-81 and 234 of the First Book of the Christian, or the fourth part (chapters 396-466) of the Twelfth Book of the Christian.

Among the arguments and authors that he quotes, the following ones must be pointed out:

- Unam Sanctam (One Saint) Papal bull, issued by pope Boniface VIII.
- Bernard of Clairvaux' De consideratione (On consideration).
- Hugh of Saint Victor's De sacramentis (On sacraments).
- Isidore of Seville Liber de personis ecclesiasticis (Book about church people).
- The Donation of Constantine.
- The canonist Enrico da Susa (who is better known as the Ostiensis cardinal, or simply the Ostiensis) in several works.

Finally, in order to confirm his argumentation, he explains how all the rulers that have attacked and pursued the Church, have had a bad end, as showing that God has punished them. And in the end of the list there is a monarch whom he has a special hostility along all his works, Frederick II Hohenstaufen. Nevertheless, the treatment that he does regarding this emperor is always very delicate, since the kings of the Crown of Aragon were his descendants, after the marriage of Constance of Sicily, his granddaughter, with Peter the Great.

== Digital editions ==
- Edition inside Eiximenis' complete works on line (in Catalan and Latin)
