= Scala Dei =

Scala Dei (Latin for "God's ladder") may refer to:

- Escaladieu Abbey, a French monastery
- Cartoixa d'Escaladei, a former Carthusian monastery in Catalonia
- Scala Dei, a treatise by Francesc Eiximenis
