= Cercapou =

The Cercapou is a literary work that deals with religious matters and that is attributed to Francesc Eiximenis. It was written in Catalan during the XIV or XV century.

== Edition ==
This work was transcribed and published by the Italian scholar Giuseppe Edoardo Sansone between 1957 and 1958.

== Authorship ==
The Swiss scholar Curt Wittlin established that this book was not written directly by Eiximenis, but used him as a source. According to Wittlin, the anonymous author of the Cercapou copied more or less literally pieces of the final part of Eiximenis' Llibre de les dones in the final section of his book. The part that was not a copy of Eiximenis was a copy of the anonymous Espill de consciència (Mirror of conscience).
