= Scala Dei (Eiximenis) =

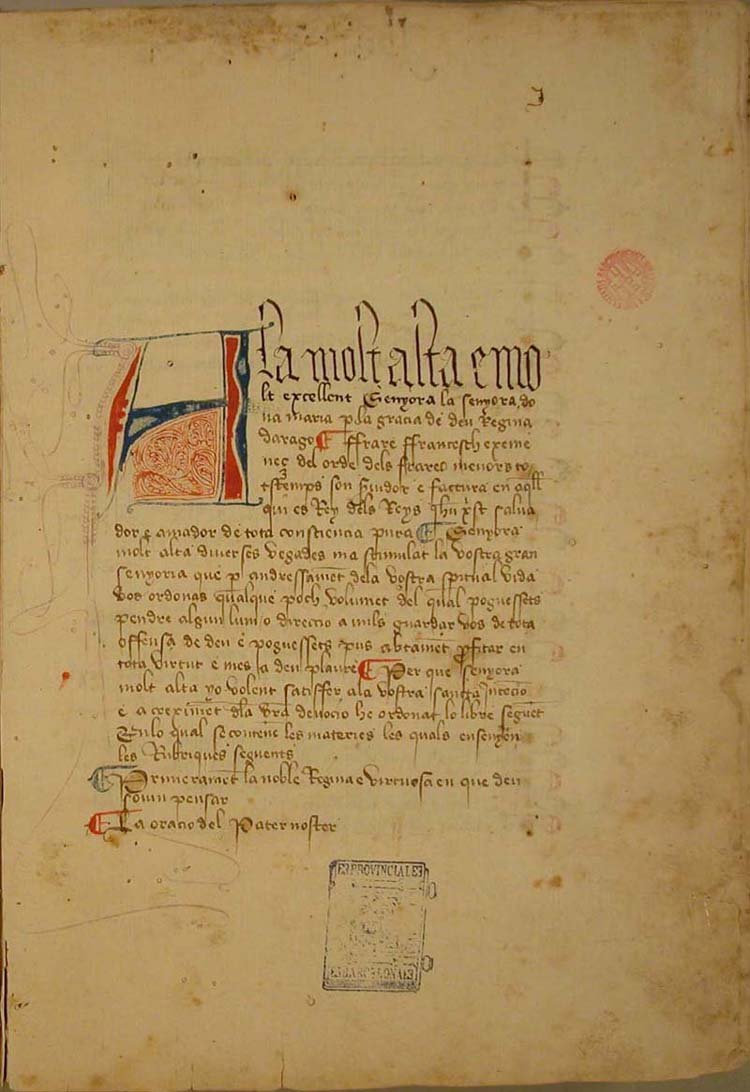
Beginning of Francesc Eiximenis' Scala Dei in the manuscript 86 from the University of Barcelona's Reserve Books.

Scala Dei (Stair of God), also called Tractat de contemplació (Contemplation treatise), is a literary work written by Francesc Eiximenis possibly in 1399 in Valencia in Catalan and dedicated to Maria de Luna, queen of the Crown of Aragon and wife of king Martin of Aragon.

== Origin ==
Some parts of the Llibre de les dones (Book of Women), specifically the ones included in the Treaty of penance and the Treatise of contemplation, were included later in the book that Eiximenis probably offered to queen Maria de Luna when his husband Martin of Aragon (and she also) was crowned, as Andreu Ivars pointed out. We know the king's coronation took place on 13 April 1399, and the queen's on 23 April 1399.

== Content ==
Thus the book that is known as Scala Dei (Stair of God), would consist in parts of the above-mentioned Llibre de les dones. Together with the parts of this work that are literally transcribed, chapters 101 to 274 (that deal with theological virtues, cardinal virtues, the Ten Commandments, the seven deadly sins and the senses) are summarized, as scholar Curt Wittlin showed. This book belongs to the genre of prayer books, which had a lot of success during the late Middle Ages and specially among the upper classes.

== Digital editions ==
=== Manuscripts ===
- Edition in the Biblioteca Virtual Joan Lluís Vives (Joan Lluís Vives Virtual Library) of the manuscript 86 from the University of Barcelona's Reserve Books.

=== Incunabula ===
- Edition in the Memòria Digital de Catalunya (Digital Memory of Catalonia) of the incunabula edition, printed in Barcelona on 27 October 1494 by Diego de Gumiel.

=== Modern editions ===
- Scala Dei. Barcelona. PAM. 1985. 100. Transcription of the ancient manuscript and preliminary notes by Curt Wittlin. Version into modern Catalan by Elisabet Ràfols.

=== Scala Dei inside Francesc Eiximenis' complete works on line ===
- Francesc Eiximenis' complete works (in Catalan and Latin)
