= Vida de Jesucrist =

c. 1399-1406 literary work by Francesc Eiximenis

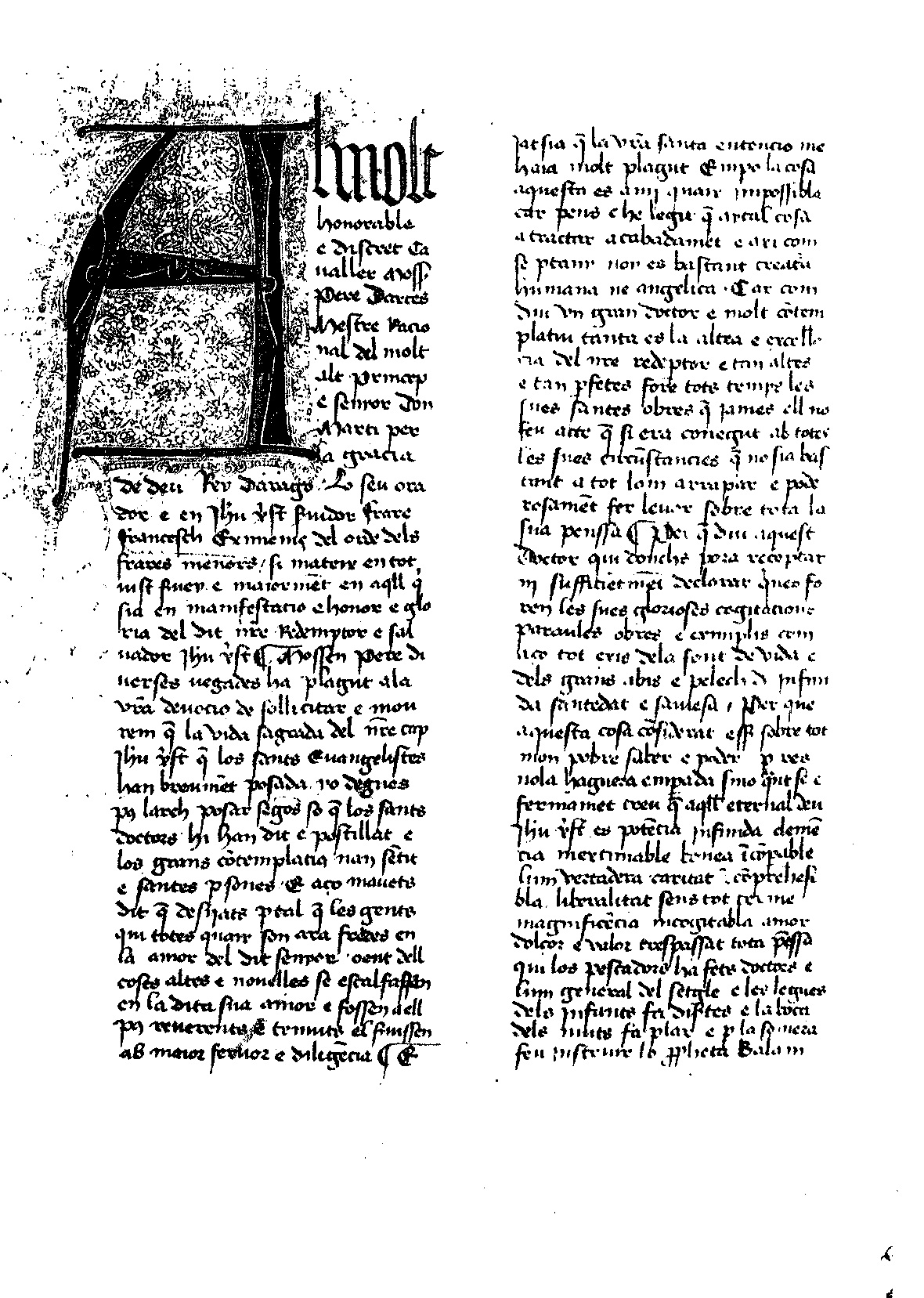
Beginning of the manuscript of Francesc Eiximenis' Vida de Jesucrist from the Library of the University of Valencia (Ms. 209. F. 1r).

The Vida de Jesucrist (Life of Jesus Christ) is a literary work by Francesc Eiximenis in Catalan written in Valencia possibly between 1399 and 1406, though the important scholar Albert Hauf dates it to 23 June 1403. It was dedicated to Pere d'Artés, who was a kind of Chancellor of the Exchequer of the Crown of Aragon, whom Eiximenis had already dedicated the Llibre dels àngels (Book of Angels).

It seems that Pere d'Artés himself encouraged Eiximenis to write the book in Catalan and not in Latin, since it was his original idea, as Eiximenis himself states in the sixth chapter of the prologue.

== Structure and content ==
The book has 691 chapters and is divided into ten treatises or parts. Moreover, the last treatise is also divided into another seven treatises.

This book belongs to the mediaeval genre of Vitae Christi (Lives of Jesus Christ), the best example of which is Ludolf of Saxony's Vita Christi. This style of work is not just a biography, as it is commonly understood, but at the same time a history, a comment taken from the Church Fathers, a series of moral and dogmatic dissertations, of spiritual instructions, of meditations and prayers in connection with the life of Christ, from his birth to his ascension. In the case of this work, we can find also Eiximenis' complete Scholasticism formation and even, and maybe only in this work, some influences of sources that we can define as somewhat heterodox, such as the New Testament apocrypha.

=== Not written volumes of Lo Crestià ===
As in the Llibre de les dones and his other books, there are in this book many parts and matters that could correspond to unwritten volumes of Lo Crestià. The whole book could correspond to the Novè (ninth volume) of his encyclopedic project Lo Crestià, which should deal with Incarnation. Nonetheless, the content of this book is much wider and so, its third treatise deals with incarnation itself. The first treatise deals with predestination, and the Quart (fourth volume) of Lo Crestià should have dealt with this matter. Lo Crestià had the intention of explaining the seven beatitudes, and the seventh treatise deals with them. This book also explains in detail two sacraments, such as baptism, regarding Christ's baptism by Saint John the Baptist and eucharist, about the Last Supper. The Desè (tenth volume) of Lo Crestià should have dealt with sacraments. In short, the tenth treatise of this book comes back again to apocalyptic and eschatological matters, and the Tretzè (thirteenth volume) of lo Crestià should have dealt with these matters.

=== Style and influences ===
This work shows very well the tendency towards contemplative of many of Eiximenis' last works. As the prologue states, the purpose of this work is escalfar (to heat up) the believers in the love of Christ and its devotion. On the other hand, in this book we can see very clearly the devotion towards the Virgin, which is so typical of the Franciscan school, since many chapters are dedicated to Virgin, the Gloriosa (Glorious), as Eiximenis calls her. Without exaggerating, it can be said that the Virgin is as important in this work as Christ itself. It seems that we can include this work within the tradition of the Meditations on the Life of Christ. Moreover, this book was influenced by the Italian Franciscan Ubertino of Casale.

== Translations ==
The book was translated into Spanish and into French.

The translation into Spanish (which does not include the two last parts or treatises), was made because of the hieronymite Hernando de Talavera, OSH, who was the first archbishop of Granada after it was reconquered in 1492 by the Catholic Monarchs. He had been appointed as Isabella I of Castille's confessor and he was a deep admirer of Francesc Eiximenis and his work. It was the first book printed in that city.

== Editions and transcriptions ==
The translation into Spanish was published as an incunabulum edition on 30 April 1496, by the German printers Meinard Ungut and Johannes Pegnitzer (also called John of Nuremberg), and this is the only edition that exists nowadays. Nevertheless, Albert Hauf transcribed the five first treatises, and he added them as an appendix to his doctoral dissertation, although this transcription is not published yet.

Therefore, there is no modern edition of this important work.

== Later influence ==
The later influence of this book can be seen in other fields. As Josep Romeu i Figueras has proved, the mystery play about the Assumption of Mary of the Valencia Cathedral (c.1425) is directly inspired by this Eiximenis' work.
