= Josep Palomero =

Spanish linguist

Josep Palomero i Almela (born 1953, in Borriana) is a Valencian linguist and vice-president of the Valencian Language Academy.

== Life ==
He has a degree in Spanish Philology in the Autonomous University of Barcelona (1976). In 2016 be got his doctorate in the Jaume I University of Castelló with a doctoral dissertation whose title was “Estudi biogràfic i literari d’Artur Perucho Badia. Comunicació I societal en la Primera meitat del segle xx” (Biographical and Literary Research on Artur Perucho Badia. Communication and Society in the First Half of the twentieth Century). He has been a high school teacher of Spanish language and literature (1977–1985) and of Valencian language and literature (1985–2013). He is member of the Valencian Language Academy, of the Association of Catalan-language writers, of the International Association of Catalan Language and Literature, of the PEN International, of the Spanish Society of Authors and Publishers and of the Spanish Center of Reprographic Rights.

Palomero has combined the job of a teacher for high school students, his political career in his village, some positions during some time in the Education Department of the Generalitat Valenciana (Valencian regional government), with his literary tasks, almost always in Catalan language. He has gotten several literary awards. The following ones can be pointed out: Jordi de Sant Jordi award for poetry (1980) and Eduard Escalante for theater (2001) (both from the Ciutat de València awards), Tirant lo Blanc award for teenagers literature (1982), València award for Novel (1983), Prize of the Critics of the Valencian Writers (1994), Ciutat d'Alzira award for Novel (1996).

== Works ==
=== Education ===
==== Teaching ====
- Guia didàctica d’Ausiàs March i els altres poetes musicats per Raimon (1985). (in Catalan)
- D’Eduard Escalante a Rodolf Sirera. Perspectiva del teatre valencià modern (1995). (in Catalan)
- Bengales en la fosca. Antologia de la poesia valenciana del segle xx (1997). (in Catalan)
- Accent greu, Llibre de llengua de nivell superior (2000). (in Catalan)

==== Literature for children and teenagers ====
- El pardalet sabut i el rei descregut (1982). (in Catalan)
- La font d’en Galceran (1989). (in Catalan)
- Vuit contes i mig (1993). (in Catalan)
- La torre de la bruixa (2005). (in Catalan)

=== Research ===
==== Literary critics ====
- Jaume Bru i Vidal i Home endins (1999). (in Catalan)
- Algunes observacions sobre les paraules de Raimon (2009). (in Catalan)
- L’aigua en les cançons de Raimon (2012). (in Catalan)
- Memòria de l’exposició Vicent Andrés Estellés, cronista de records i d’esperances (2013). (in Catalan)
- La producció literària en valencià de Lluís Guarner (2014). (in Catalan)
- Les lletres de les cançons de Raimon (2015). (in Catalan)

==== About Borriana ====
- L'etimologia del nom Borriana (1976). (in Catalan)
- Toponímia urbana de Borriana (1980). (in Catalan)
- Pell de taronja, mig segle [1890-1940] d'arquitectura a Borriana (1986). (in Catalan)
- Antroponímia popular de Borriana: els malnoms (1987). (in Catalan)
- La literatura popular a Borriana (1990). (in Catalan)
- Els jocs de carrer dels xiquets i xiquetes de Borriana (1995). (in Catalan)
- Cançons populars de Borriana (1998). (in Catalan)
- Borriana gràfica segle XX (1999). (in Catalan)
- Rafel Martí de Viciana, de Joan Rodríguez Condesa (2003). (in Catalan)
- Cítric desig (2003). (in Catalan)
- Toponímia costera i lèxic mariner de Borriana (2011). (in Catalan)

==== Cultural ====
- Columbretes, de Ludwig Salvator (1990). (in Catalan)
- Del barco de vapor al ferrocarril in Viajeros franceses por la Valencia del siglo XIX (1994). (in Spanish)

=== Poetry ===
- Una untada de mostaza (1972). (in Spanish)
- Innocents de pagana decadència (1978). (in Catalan)
- Crònica carnal (1980). (in Catalan)
- Quaderns de bitàcola (1986). (in Catalan)
- La rosa dels vents (1997). (in Catalan)

=== Novels ===
- El col·leccionista de botons (1979). (in Catalan)
- El pianista de jazz (1983). (in Catalan)
- Ball de màscares (1992). (in Catalan)
- Els secrets de Meissen (1994) (translated into Spanish and adapted as a short TV series for the Spanish Television). (in Catalan)
- El tatuatge dels apàtrides (1997). (in Catalan)
- El secreto de la porcelana (1999). (in Spanish)

=== Theater ===
- Zona de lliure trànsit (2001, in collaboration with Vicente Muñoz Puelles). (in Catalan)

=== Other literary activities ===
==== Literary adaptations ====
- Joanot Martorell's Tirant lo Blanc (2005). (in Catalan)
- Francesc Eiximenis' Regiment de la cosa pública (2009). (in Catalan)
- Les aventures de Tirant lo Blanch (2013). (in Catalan)

==== Translations into Catalan ====
- Aingeru Epaltza's Caçadors de tigres (1998, Tigre ehizan).
- Vicente Muñoz Puelles' El tigre de Tasmània (1999) and El lleopard de les neus (2001).

==== Scripts fot TV series ====
- Antoni Josep Cavanilles (1994). (in Catalan)
- El Marquès del Campo (1994). (in Spanish)
