= Antoni Maria Badia i Margarit =

Catalan linguist (1920–2014)

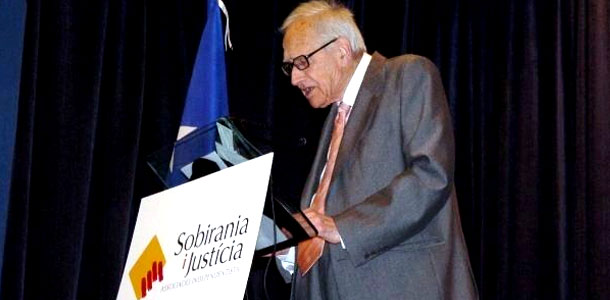
Antoni Maria Badia i Margarit

Antoni Maria Badia i Margarit (30 May 1920 – 16 November 2014) was a Catalan linguist and philologist who produced works on the grammar and history of the Catalan language. He was born in Barcelona.

He graduated in philology or Romance languages at the Universitat de Barcelona in 1943, where he was professor of history of Catalan language and Spanish language. He was rector of Universitat de Barcelona from 1978 to 1986. He is visitor professor of several universities around the world (Munich, Heidelberg, Georgetown, Wisconsin, and Sorbone in Paris). He is doctor honoris causa by several universities (Salzburg, Toulouse, Rovira i Virgili in Tarragona, Sorbone in Paris, and Illes Balears). He has been president of the Société de Linguistique Romane, president of Philology section of Institut d'Estudis Catalans, president of Associació Internacional de Llengua i Literatura Catalanes, president of North-American Catalan Society, president of Deutsch-Katalanische Gesellschaft, and president of Segon Congrés Internacional de la Llengua Catalana (1986). He died in 2014, aged 94.

== Biblioteca Badia-Cardús ==
In 1975, while the activities of the Congrés de Cultura Catalana were beginning, Badia and his wife Maria Cardús announced the donation of their library and archive to the Biblioteca de Catalunya. The collection contains more than a thousand books, periodicals, and leaflets concerning the linguistics and pedagogy of the Romance languages, especially the Catalan and Spanish languages, many of which are unique or very rare.
