= Llibre de les dones =

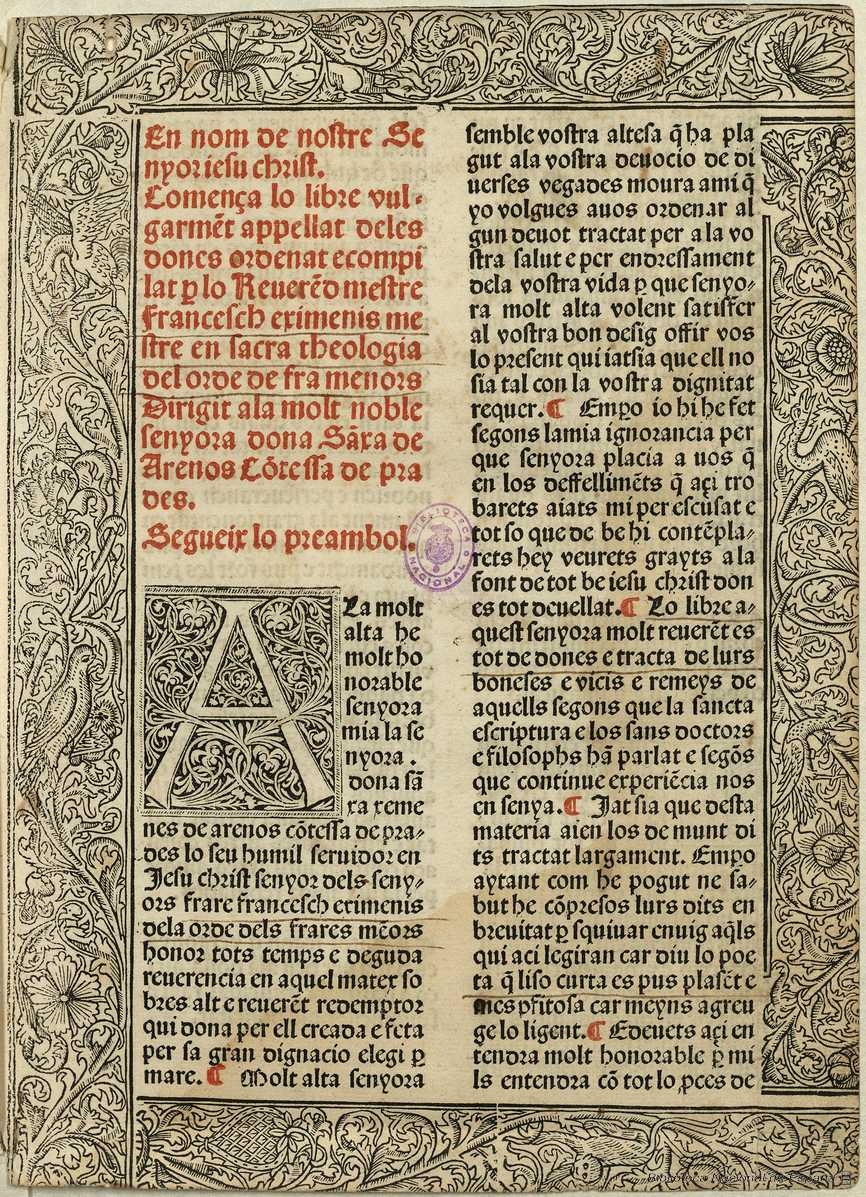
Beginning of the incunabulum edition of Francesc Eiximenis' Llibre de les Dones printed in Barcelona in 1495.

The Llibre de les Dones (Book of Women) is a book that was possibly written between 1387 and 1392 by Francesc Eiximenis in Catalan in Valencia and dedicated to Sanxa Ximenes d'Arenós, countess of Prades.

== Date ==
Regarding its date of composition, there has been some discrepancy, since other scholars, such as Martí de Barcelona, OFM Cap, date this work towards 1396. Nonetheless, Curt Wittlin considers that the date of composition should be between 1387 and 1392 because of two reasons. First of all, this book deals in an abridged way with some matters that should have been treated in other not written books of Lo Crestià. We can think then that he used this prepared materials for this book. Secondly, in this book there are many references to angels. As professor Wittlin has quite shrewdly pointed out, this fact can only been explained because Eiximenis very probably bore in mind the composition of his next book, the Llibre dels àngels (Book of angels), that dealt with this matter and that was written in 1392.

== Structure and content ==
The book has three hundred ninety-six chapters, which are divided into five parts, after a general introduction. These five parts correspond to the different conditions of women: child, maiden, married, widow and nun.

=== Education of women according to medieval guidelines ===
In its initial chapters, this books aims to be a kind of manual for the instruction of women, similar to the ones that were used during this time. It seems to have influence of other books of this sort, such as that of the Dominican Vincent de Beauvais' De eruditione filiorum nobilium (On the Erudition of the Sons of the Nobles) (circa 1250), that influenced a lot the whole Middle Ages as to the basic guidelines for feminine education.

=== Not written volumes of Lo Crestià ===
Nevertheless, the final part, the one dedicated to nuns, which is the longest one, is a short treatise on theology. In this part Eiximenis gathers many of the materials (even though they are explained in a basic and schematic way), that were going to be used in the unwritten volumes of Lo Crestià. So this part deals with the theological virtues (and the Cinquè, or fifth volume should have dealt with them), the cardinal virtues (and the Sisè, or sixth volume should have dealt with them), and about the Ten Commandments (and the Setè, or seventh volume should have dealt with them).

Other matters that are scattered through the book, correspond to matters that other unwritten volumes of Lo Crestià should have dealt with. They speak for instance about marriage and penance (and the Desè, or tenth volume, should have dealt with sacraments), religious vows and contemplation (and the Onzè, or eleventh volume, should have dealt with clergy) or about the final chapters, that deal with eschatological (and the Tretzè, or thirteenth volume, should have dealt with Eschatology and the end of the world, and the reward or punishment that people will then receive, according to medieval mentality.

Moreover, Eiximenis deals again in an abridged way with matters that appear in the Terç (third volume of Lo Crestià), such as the seven deadly sins and the five senses.

== Translations into Spanish ==
Several translations of this book were made into Spanish, and this Spanish version was even used for the education of the four daughters of the Catholic Monarchs.

There was as well an adaptation by an unknown author with some changes, also in Spanish, that was published in 1542, and that is known as Carro de las Donas.

== Digital editions ==
=== Incunabula ===
- Edition in the Biblioteca Digital Hispánica (Hispanic Digital Library) of the incunabula edition printed by Joan Rosembach (Barcelona, 8 May 1495).

=== Old editions ===
- Edition in Somni (Digitalized collection of the old books of the University of Valencia) of the edition of the Carro de las Donas printed by Juan de Villaquigrán in Valladolid in 1542.

=== Modern editions ===
- Edition of the Llibre de les dones (Barcelona. Curial Edicions Catalanes. 1981. XXXVII+620. Introduction by Curt Wittlin). Franck Naccarato's doctoral dissertation submitted to Joan Coromines (University of Chicago, 1965).

=== The Llibre de les Dones inside Eiximenis' complete works ===
- Francesc Eiximenis' complete works (in Catalan and in Latin).
