= Regiment de la cosa pública =

1383 book by Francesc Eiximenis

The Regiment de la Cosa Pública (Government of the Republic) is a work that has 38 chapters and that was written in Catalan by Francesc Eiximenis in 1383. It was just written after Eiximenis' arrival in Valencia, and it was dedicated to the jurats (representatives of the city).

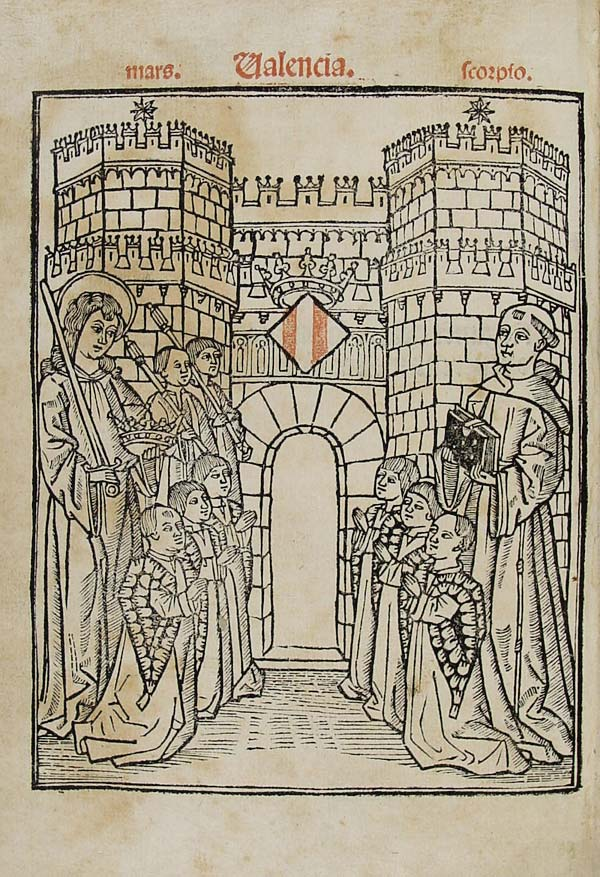
Title page of the incunable edition of the Regiment de la Cosa Pública (Valencia, Cristòfor Cofman, 1499). Francesc Eiximenis is on the right. He offers his book to the jurats of Valencia. On the left is the guardian angel of the city and kingdom of Valencia. The six Jurats de Valencia are kneeling in front of the Serrans gothic gate of the ancient wall of Valencia.

== General information ==
This dedicatory to the "jurats" is what gives us some clues about the period when this book was written. Another work by Eiximenis, the Dotzè del Crestià (Twelfth of the Christian), which is a part of his encyclopaedia called Lo Crestià (The Christian), includes, as its chapters 357-395, the Regiment de la Cosa Pública. As an independent work it was only published in an incunabulum edition in Valencia on 28 January 1499 by the German printer Cristòfor Cofman.

This book has a strong influence from John of Wales' Communiloquium, as some studies have proved. On the other hand, it seems that some parts of this book were not written by Eiximenis, and could have been added later. These ones are the famous twenty difficulties, thirty-two beauties and the end of the prologue, together with the end of the epilogue. The Regiment de la Cosa Pública expresses quite well the essential features of Francesc Eiximenis' social and political thought. It also explains the basic guidelines of what has been called "Catalan and Aragonese pactism".

== Translation into English ==
- How to Govern a City. Translated by Curt Wittlin. Unpublished.

== Digital editions ==
=== Incunabula ===
- Edition in the Virtual Library "Joan Lluís Vives".
- Edition in the Digital Valencian Library.

=== The Regiment de la Cosa Pública inside Eiximenis' complete works ===
- Francesc Eiximenis' complete works (in Catalan and in Latin)
