= Friedrich Wilhelm Bautz =

German theologian (1906–1979)

Friedrich Wilhelm Bautz (20 December 1906, Brambauer, Lünen – 19 August 1979, Dortmund) was a Protestant theologian and writer.

== Life ==
Bautz studied theology in Münster, Bethel (Bielefeld), Berlin and Tübingen. From February 1939, he was pastor in the Franz Arndt-Haus, a home for war invalids in Volmarstein. He later served as pastor in Kriescht and Annarode. From 1954 to 1958, he worked for the Neukirchener Verlagsgesellschaft as a publishing editor and simultaneously served as a parish representative at the Dorfkirche Stiepel parish. In 1959, he served as a substitute during a sick leave in Heven (Witten). In the Dortmund City and State Library as well as in the University and State Library of Münster, Bautz worked on the Biographisch-Bibliographisches Kirchenlexikon (BBKL), a reference work he founded, authored and edited. In all, he edited, researched and wrote 3,534 articles for the same himself. With the piano teacher Else Bautz, née Schlimm, whom he married in 1939, he had three children, a daughter and two sons. His youngest child, Traugott Bautz (1945–2020) continued the editorship of the Biographisch-Bibliographisches Kirchenlexikon from 1979.

== Selected works ==
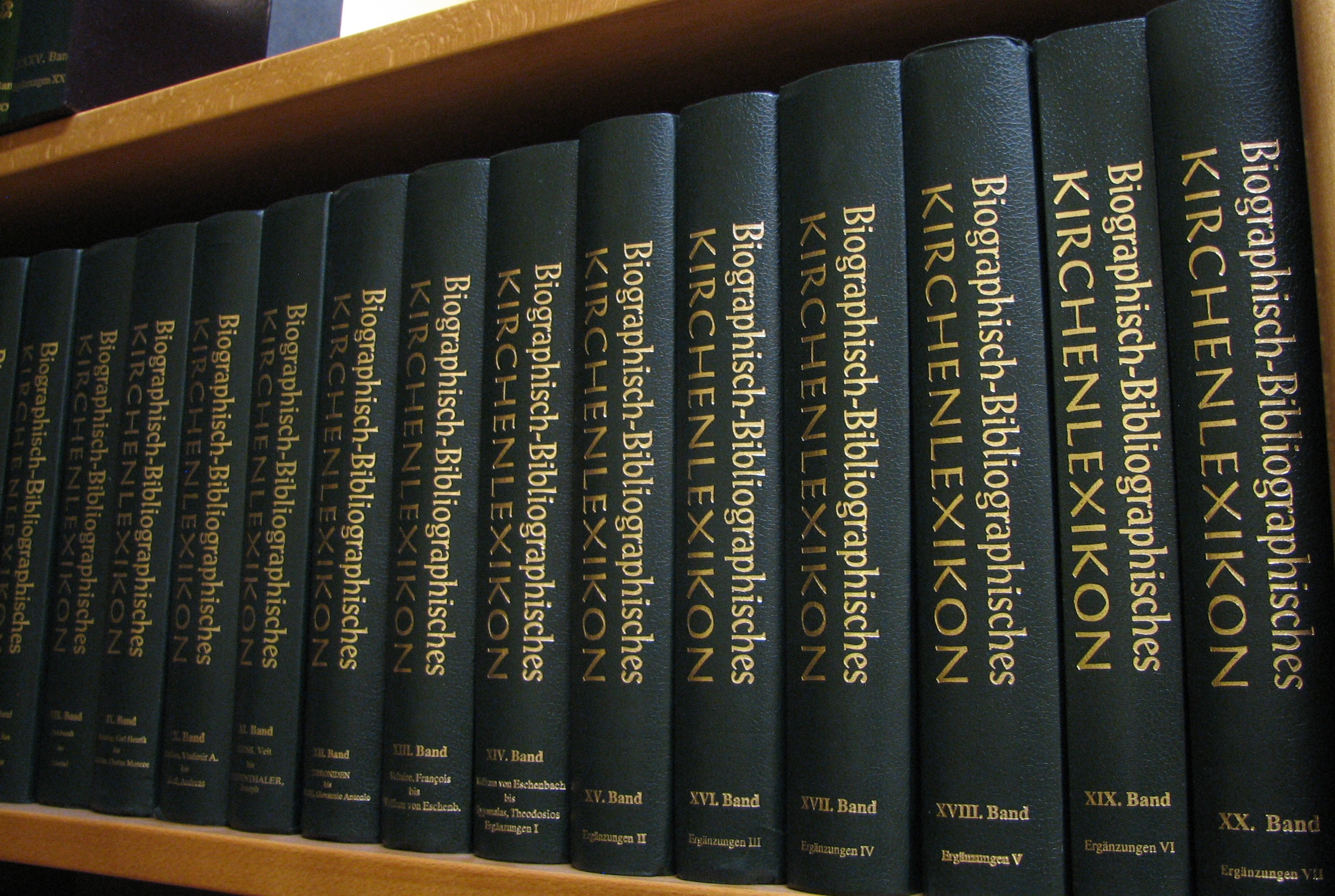
Bautz, founder of BBKL

- Meine Seele ist stille zu Gott ("My soul is silent to God"). Witten 1936, OCLC 71985261.
- Er weiß dein Leid und heimlich Grämen. Trostbüchlein ("He knows your suffering and secret grievances. Consolation booklet"). Konstanz 1939, OCLC 71985252.
- Dein Weggenosse – Ein Kurzandachtsbuch für das Jahr 1949 ("Your Companion – A Short Devotional Book for the Year 1949"). Konstanz 1948, OCLC 312471709.
- Wir haben einen Gott, der da hilft. Feierstunde in der Gemeinde zum Jahresschluß ("We have a God to help. Celebration in the community at the end of the year"). Witten 1948, OCLC 73243692.
- Siegend schreitet Jesus über Land und Meer ("Jesus walks victoriously over land and sea") (= Glaubenshelden und Gottesstreiter ["Heroes of faith and warriors of God"]. Volume 1). Konstanz 1949, OCLC 458669323.
- Es kostet viel, ein Christ zu sein ("It costs a lot to be a Christian") (= Glaubenshelden und Gottesstreiter["Heroes of faith and warriors of God"]. Volume 2). Konstanz 1949, OCLC 312471529.
- Verheißungslicht und Erfüllungsfreude. Eine Weihnachtsfeierstunde in der Sonntagsschule. Was brachte uns die Weihnacht? Eine Weihnachtsfeierstunde in der Gemeinde. Gestaltung der Feier und Auswahl der Texte ("Promise and joy of fulfillment. A Christmas party in Sunday School. What did Christmas bring us? A Christmas party in the community. Design of the celebration and selection of texts) (= Evangeliums-Gedichte ["Gospel poems"]. Notebook 29/30). Witten 1948, OCLC 73243687.
- Die Neuapostolischen. Eine Darstellung ihrer Geschichte, Lehre und Verfassung und ihre Beurteilung im Lichte der Bibel ("The new apostolics. A presentation of their history, doctrine and constitution and their assessment in the light of the Bible") (= Kelle und Schwert ["Trowel and Sword"]. Notebook 81). Witten 1949, OCLC 613878716.
- Ein Christ kann ohne Kreuz nicht sein ("A Christian cannot be without a cross") (= Kreuzträger unter den Liederdichtern ["Cross bearer among the songwriters]". Volume 3). Baden-Baden 1952, OCLC 632545745.
- Von Gott will ich nicht lassen! ("I don't want to let go of God!") (= Kreuzträger unter den Liederdichtern ["Cross bearer among the songwriters]". Volume 2). Baden-Baden 1952, OCLC 632545769.
- Worte für die Stille ("Words for silence"). Witten 1952, OCLC 73243697.
- Festliche Stunden im Frühling. Ich singe mit, wenn alles singt. Eine Frühlingsfeier für die Sonntagsschule und den Jugendkreis. Gedicht für das Fest der Himmelfahrt. Vorlese- und Vortragsstoff für den Muttertag ("Festive hours in spring. I sing along when everything is singing. A spring celebration for Sunday School and the youth circle. Poem for the Feast of the Ascension. Reading and lecture material for Mother's Day") (= Evangeliums-Gedichte ["Gospel poems"]. Notebook 38/39). Witten 1953, OCLC 1071279995.
- Irrlehren im Lichte der heiligen Schrift ("Heresies in the light of scripture"). Bielefeld 1954, OCLC 1068337360.
- Die Christliche Wissenschaft ("The Christian Science") (= Kelle und Schwert ["Trowel and Sword"]. Notebook 83). Witten 1954, OCLC 73243694.
- Jesus ist kommen, Grund ewiger Freude. Eine Weihnachtsfeier in der Sonntagschule ("Jesus is coming, the reason for eternal joy. A Christmas party at Sunday School") (= Evangeliums-Gedichte ["Gospel poems"]. Notebook 33). Witten 1954, OCLC 73476592.
- Anthroposophie und Christengemeinschaft ("Anthroposophy and Christian Community") (= Kelle und Schwert ["Trowel and Sword"]. Notebook 88). Witten 1954, OCLC 73227199.
- Die Adventisten vom Siebenten Tage. Eine Darstellung ihrer Geschichte und Lehre und ihre Beurteilung im Lichte der Bibel ("The Seventh-Day Adventists. A presentation of their history and teaching and their assessment in the light of the Bible") (= Kelle und Schwert. Notebook 82). Witten 1955, OCLC 1070938622.
- Erntedank. Feierstunde in der Gemeinde zum Erntedankfest ("Thanksgiving. Celebration in the congregation for Thanksgiving") (= Evangeliums-Gedichte ["Gospel poems"]. Notebook 32/32a). Witten 1954, OCLC 73476592.
- Verderbliche Irrlehren ("Perishable heresies") (= Kelle und Schwert ["Trowel and Sword"]. Notebook 15). Witten 1955, OCLC 1072750376.
- Die Weihnachtsgeschichte in Wort und Lied. Eine Weihnachtsfeierstunde in der Sonntagsschule ("The Christmas story in words and songs. A Christmas celebration in Sunday school") (= Evangeliums-Gedichte ["Gospel poems"]. Notebook 48/49). Witten 1956, OCLC 73243690.
- Verderbliche Irrlehren. Worte der Aufklärung und Abwehr ("Perishable heresies. Words of enlightenment and defense") (= Kelle und Schwert ["Trowel and Sword"]. Notebook 15). Witten 1956, OCLC 73243679.
- Er füllt leere Hände. Tägliche Andachten ("He fills empty hands. Daily devotions"). Neukirchen-Vluyn 1965, OCLC 917426021.
- In Gottes Schule. Ein Buch der Hilfe und des Trostes ("In God's school. A book of help and comfort"). Stuttgart 1965, OCLC 73243684.
- In keinem andern ist das Heil. Eine Christusverkündigung aus alter und neuer Zeit ("In no other is salvation. A proclamation of Christ from old and new times"). Gladbeck 1966, OCLC 6954953.
- Das Wort vom Kreuz: Evangelische und katholische Theologen verkünden Christus, den Gekreuzigten ("The Word of the Cross: Protestant and Catholic theologians proclaim Christ the Crucified"). Einsiedeln/Zürich/Köln 1967, OCLC 73929176.
  - La parola della croce: teologi evangelici e cattolici annunciano Cristo il crocifisso (= Spiritualità del nostro tempo). Assisi 1969, OCLC 72394994.
- Für dich – Für heute. Ein Wort der Heiligen Schrift als Geleit für den Tag ("For you – For today. A word of Sacred Scripture as an accompaniment for the day"). Regensburg 1974, ISBN 3772200834.
- Die Mormonen. Worte der Aufklärung und Abwehr ("The Mormons. Words of Enlightenment and Defense"). Gladbeck 1976, ISBN 3-7958-0028-5.
- Adventisten. Worte der Aufklärung und Abwehr ("Adventists. Words of Enlightenment and Defense"). Gladbeck 1976, ISBN 3795800870.
- Die Christengemeinschaft, einschließlich Anthroposophie. Worte der Aufklärung und Abwehr ("The Christian Community, including anthroposophy. Words of enlightenment and defense"). Gladbeck 1976, ISBN 3-7958-0018-8.
- Die „Christliche Wissenschaft". Worte der Aufklärung und Abwehr ("The 'Christian Science'. Words of Enlightenment and Defense"). Gladbeck 1976, ISBN 3-7958-0008-0.
- Die Pfingstbewegung. Worte der Aufklärung und Abwehr ("The Pentecostal movement. Words of Enlightenment and Defense"). Gladbeck 1976, ISBN 3-7958-0038-2.
- Zeugen Jehovas. Worte der Aufklärung und Abwehr ("Jehovah's Witnesses. Words of Enlightenment and Defense"). Gladbeck 1976, ISBN 3795800978.

== Sources ==
- Bautz, Traugott (2018). "Bautz, Friedrich Wilhelm". Biographisch-Bibliographisches Kirchenlexikon (BBKL) (in German). Vol. 39. Nordhausen: Bautz. pp. 54–57. ISBN 978-3-95948-350-6.
