= Andreu Ivars =

Spanish historian

Andrés Ivars
- Born: 1885; Benissa, Spain
- Died: 1936 (aged 50–51); Gata de Gorgos, Spain
- Occupations: Priest and historian

Andreu Ivars i Cardona, in Spanish Andrés Ivars (Benissa, 1885 – Gata de Gorgos, 1936), was a Valencian Franciscan priest and historian.

== Early years ==
He went to the Franciscan convent of Sant Esperit from Gilet, near Sagunt (Valencian region) in 1900 and the next year he became officially Franciscan. In 1909 he became priest. Since he was a gifted student, he was sent to the Pontifical University Antonianum of Rome, where he studied Patristics and History of the Church. At the same time he studied Paleography and Diplomatics in the Public School of the Vatican Secret Archives. In 1913 he was sent to the historical research center that the Franciscan Order had in Quaracchi, near Florence, where he remained a year.

== Career ==
In 1914 Jaime Sala died. He came from the same province as he, and he was one of the founders of the review called Archivo Ibero-Americano (AIA). Ivars replaced him as representative of the Franciscan province of Valencia, and since then he wrote in this review. In 1919 he became vice-director and, finally in 1928, director. He came back to his province for some time, where he did several tasks: Master of Students and Chronicler among others. From 1920 until 1936 he lived in Madrid, and he was devoted to historical research. Many of them were published in the already mentioned review AIA. He wrote then several articles or books, both in Spanish and Valencian. These works dealt with history or with culture in general, both about Franciscan and Valencian matters. The medieval Valencian author whom he devoted most of his works was Francesc Eiximenis.

== Death ==
On 20 July 1936, just after the Spanish Civil War outburst, members of the Republican militia set the Cardinal Cisneros College to fire. It was the headquarters of the review AIA, and the Franciscans were caught by the militia. Andreu Ivars was not there on that moment, but his library, archive and everything that he had gathered after years of research was set to fire. He went first to the "Villa Luz" clinic, where he was chaplain. Afterwards he moved to the house of some friends of him, and finally he decided to go with his family. When he was going to Benissa, he was recognized and arrested in Denia. Next morning, on 8 September 1936, his corpse appeared near Gata de Gorgos, since he had been shot. There is a beatification process of him owing to this fact.

== Works ==
=== Books ===
- Dos creuades valenciano-mallorquines a les costes de Berberia. València. Imprenta de Olmos y Luján. 1921. CXXI+175. This book was rewarded in the Floral Games of Valencia of 1919. (in Catalan)
- El escritor Fr. Francisco Eximénez en Valencia (1383-1408). Benissa. Ajuntament de Benissa (Comissió de Cultura). 1989. 239 pp. (in Spanish)

=== Articles ===
- Cuándo y en dónde murió el infante fray Pedro de Aragón. 1916. (in Spanish)
- Los jurados de Valencia y el inquisidor Fr. Nicolás Eymerich, O.P. AIA, VI. 1916. 68-159. (in Spanish)
- ¿Quién es el autor del “Tractat de Confession” impreso en Valencia, año de 1497, por Nicolás Spindeler, bajo el nombre de Fr. Francisco Eiximénez? AIA, XIV. 1920. 251-6. (in Spanish)
- Algunos documentos del rey Martín el Humano relativos a los franciscanos. AIA, XIII. 1920. 408-13. (in Spanish)
- El Llibre dels Àngels de Fr. Francisco Eximénez y algunas versiones castellanas del mismo. AIA, XIX. 1923. 108-24. (in Spanish)
- Cronistas franciscanos de la Provincia de Valencia. AIA, XXVIII. 1927. 263-71. (in Spanish)
- La “indiferencia” de Pedro IV de Aragón en el Gran Cisma de Occidente. AIA, XXIX. 1928. 21-97 (52-3); 161-86. (in Spanish)
- Sobre la graduación en teología de Fr. Nicolás Costa, O.F.M.. AIA, XXXII. 1929. 386-91 (388-90). (in Spanish)
- Francesc Ferrer, poeta valencià del sigle XV. 1930. (in Catalan)
- Franciscanismo de la reina de Aragón Doña María de Luna (1396-1406). AIA, XXXIV. 568-94; AIA, XXXVI. 1933. 255-81; 416-32. (in Spanish)

=== Literary reviews ===
- Review of Zarco Cuevas, Julián. O.S.A. Catálogo de manuscritos castellanos de la Real Biblioteca de El Escorial. AIA, XXIV. 1925. 121-2. (in Spanish)
- Review of Foligno, Angela di. Le livre de l’experience des vrais fidèles. (Paris. Droz. 1927. XLVIII+536. Translated by M.-J- Ferre and L. Baudry). AIA, XXIX. 1928. 395-402 (401). (in Spanish)
- Review of Eiximenis, Francesc. Doctrina Compendiosa. (Barcelona. Editorial Barcino. 1929. 157. Text and footnotes by Martí de Barcelona, O.F.M. Cap. “Els Nostres Clàssics”. Collection A nº 24). AIA, XXXII. 1929. 278-81. (in Spanish)
- Review of Martí de Barcelona. O.F.M. Cap. Fra Francesc Eiximenis, O.M. (1340?-1409?). La seva vida, els seus escrits, la seva personalitat literària. (EF, XL. 1928. 437-500). AIA, XXXII. 1929. 276-8. (in Spanish)
- Review of Joan de Gal·les, O.F.M. Breviloqui. (Barcelona. Editorial Barcino. 1930. 175. Text and footnotes by Norbert d’Ordal, O.F.M. Cap. “Els Nostres Clàssics”. Collection A nº 28). AIA, XXXIV. 1931. 143-6. (in Spanish)
