= Guillem de Copons =

Guillem de Copons (?, 14th cent. — ?, 15th cent.) was a writer and diplomat, possibly of Valencian origin, that made some translations into Catalan from some important ancient Greek, classical Latin and the European Middle Ages literary works.

He was a stableman of the kings Peter IV and John I. They entrusted him some literary tasks. He had some relationship with the Hospitallers Great Master Juan Fernández de Heredia. In 1383 he brought John I on the duke of Berry's behalf a French version of saint Augustine's De Civitate Dei, and he was sent again by the king to visit this duke in order to get a copy of the manuscript that he had of the French version of Titus Livius' Ab urbe condita. The Catalan translations that were then made from these French versions have been attributed to him. In 1396 the queen Violant de Bar sent him as ambassador to the papal court in Avignon and to some French noblemen, in order to find out something about the invasion menaces of Catalonia by the count of Armagnac. But it was in vain, since king John I died. In 1418 he dedicated the Valencian sponsor Pere d'Artés his Catalan version of Brunetto Latini's Treasure, written in French, that included Aristotle's Ethics. It was the first Catalan version, although not direct, from this classical writer.
