= Hug de Llupià =

Catalan writer and bishop

Hug de Llupià i Bages (Roussillon, ? - ?, 1427), was bishop of Tortosa, bishop of Valencia, and a Catalan writer in Latin. He belonged to a noble family from the Roussillon, and he was the brother of Ramon de Llupià. He had a lot of influence and was next to the king most of the time he lived.

== Life ==
He was son of Pere de Llupià, who was the lord of Bages in Catalonia and the castle of Monistrol in the Roussillon, and brother of Ramon de Llupià.

He was appointed bishop of Tortosa in 1379, and he was there until 1397. In 1388 he stated in his diocese the Immaculate Conception festivity, and he issued several synode constitutions for the years 1390, 1393 and 1397. When the king of the Crown of Aragon John the Hunter died, he was part of a commission that went to Sicily in order to meet Martin the Humane and to ask him to come back to Catalonia. The Avignon Pope Benedict XIII, as a consequence of a request from King Martin, moved him to the see of Valencia, where he was bishop from 1398 to 1427, when he died. In 1408 he went to the Council of Perpignan and, when he came back to Valencia, he was triumphantly received. He did not take part, however, in the Council of Constance. He summoned a synod in 1422 and issued eight constitutions, which dealt with the mass celebration. He is buried in the main chapel of the Cathedral of Valencia. Francesc Eiximenis dedicated to him the Pastorale, which is a book written in Latin that deals with advice for priests and bishops, and that follows the classical Saint Gregory's Pastorale.

== Works ==
- Liturgical and synode constitutions (in Latin)
- Liber Instrumentorum (in Latin)

== Bibliography ==
- (in Catalan) Mariàngela Vilallonga. La literatura llatina a Catalunya al segle XV. Repertori bio-bibliogràfic (1993, ISBN 978-84-7256-930-0).
- (in Spanish) Fèlix Torres Amat. Memorias para ayudar a formar un diccionario crítico de los escritores catalanes, Barcelona, 1836.
