= Interuniversity Institute of Valencian Philology =

The Interuniversity Institute of Valencian Philology (Valencian: Institut Interuniversitari de Filologia Valenciana, IIFV), was created in 1987, and took form with a decree of the Generalitat Valenciana that was issued in 1994. It is composed by the University of Valencia, the University of Alicante and the University Jaume I, from Castellón de la Plana, i.e., the three Valencian universities with superior philology studies.

== Aims ==
- The linguistic and literary study of Valencian, inside the general frame of the Catalan language and literature.
- Teaching and researching aims.
- Advising in all the fields that have some kind of relationship with the Valencian linguistic and literary fact.
- Apart from the autonomy that each university has, the IIFV will be the only organism that, on behalf of all the universities that are its members, will be able to advise and to rule over the philological matters that are inside its domain.

== Internal structure ==
The IIFV has a Board of Directors, a General Council and a Consultant Council, together with technical and auxiliary staff, and scholars. The board of directors is composed by 49 Valencian philology specialists. Its members choose every four years the Director. They are responsible of fulfilling the IIFV scientific aims. The Director rules with the board of directors. The Consultant Council is composed by eleven specialists from all the world, and its mission is to advise the General Council in all the scientific matters that it is requested of. The present IIFV director is the Catalan Philology Professor from the University of Valencia, Ferran Carbó.
