= Biographisch-Bibliographisches Kirchenlexikon =

German biographical encyclopedia

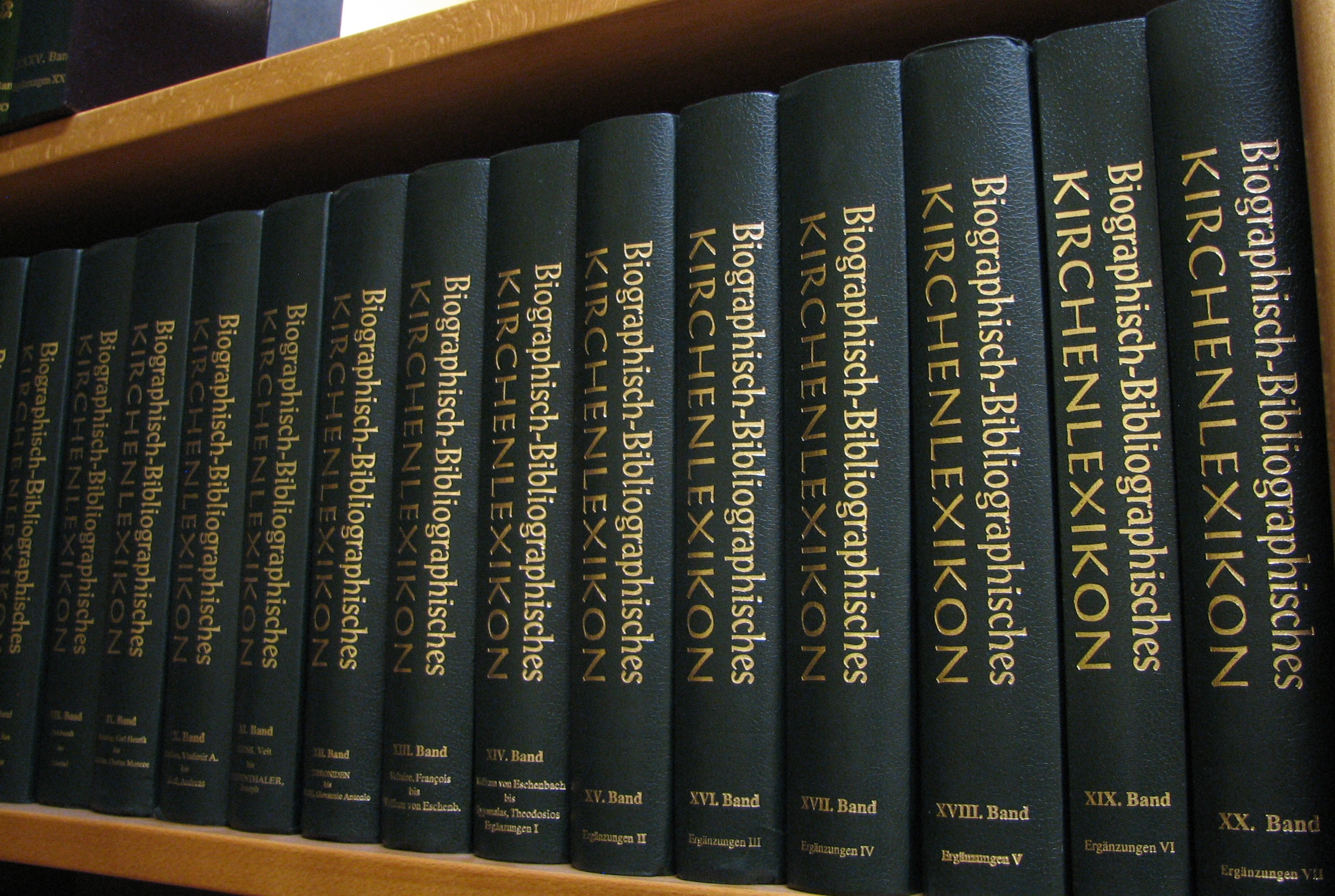
Biographisch-Bibliographisches Kirchenlexikon. Edited by Friedrich Wilhelm Bautz. Published by Verlag Traugott Bautz 1975-.

The Biographisch-Bibliographisches Kirchenlexikon (BBKL) is a German biographical encyclopedia covering deceased persons related to the history of the church, philosophy and literature, founded by Friedrich Wilhelm Bautz, the first volume of which appeared in 1975..

It features over 20,000 articles, many of which were made freely available online between 1996 and 2011. The online service now operates on a subscription model. Though, courtesy of the Internet Archive, some such entries remain available as archived pages and many of the print volumes are available to read online (with free registration).

== History ==
Shortly after the Second World War, the pastor Friedrich Bautz developed the idea of writing a biographical lexicon of protestant church figures. His son, Traugott Bautz (1945–2020), recalls that his father had originally envisioned writing a two-volume handbook. However, the family's remote and isolated location in the small village of Holtorf (now part of Schnackenburg) on the border with Soviet-occupied Germany, being far from any accessible academic libraries, made such an undertaking impossible at the time. Friedrich Bautz did however make initial steps in this project using his own library of academic texts and by making enquiries to specialist libraries and church archives.

Working on the project from the 1950s, Friedrich Bautz conceived of the work, which had the working title "Ihm zu dienen welch ein Stand" as containing 3,000 short biographies. His father being unable to find an interested publisher, Traugott, an independent bookseller from 1966, founded a publishing house in 1968. From there the work, which had been extended in scope to cover non-Protestant Christians and had developed a greater focus on bibliographic information, was printed and distributed initially in loose-leaf fascicles (instalments). The first two of these were published in 1970.

The first volume, written, researched and edited entirely by Friedrich Bautz was published in 1975.

Traugott Bautz continued the project after his father's death, but had the articles written by experts. From 1996 onwards, the articles were also placed on the Internet. The basic work was completed with Volume 14 in 1998, and from then on supplementary volumes were published at least annually. He was responsible for editing volumes 3 through to 41.

Since the death of Traugott Bautz, the BBKL has been headed by his widow Uta Timpe-Bautz.

== Volumes ==
- Friedrich Wilhelm Bautz (from Volume 3 onwards continued by Traugott Bautz): Biographisch-bibliographisches Kirchenlexikon, 14 Bände (+ bisher 14 Ergänzungsbände), Bautz, Hamm 1975ff
  - Volume 1 (Aalders–Faustus v. Byzanz), Hamm 1975, ISBN 3-88309-013-1
  - Volume 2 (Faustus v. Mileve–Jeanne, d'Arc), Hamm 1990, ISBN 3-88309-032-8
  - Volume 3 (Jedin–Kleinschmidt), Herzberg 1992, ISBN 3-88309-035-2
  - Volume 4 (Kleist–Leyden), Herzberg 1992, ISBN 3-88309-038-7
  - Volume 5 (Leyen–Mönch), Herzberg 1993, ISBN 3-88309-043-3
  - Volume 6 (Moenius–Patijn), Herzberg 1993, ISBN 3-88309-044-1
  - Volume 7 (Patocka–Remachus), Herzberg 1994, ISBN 3-88309-048-4
  - Volume 8 (Rembrandt–Scharbel (Charbel)), Herzberg 1994, ISBN 3-88309-053-0
  - Volume 9 (Scharling–Sheldon), Herzberg 1995, ISBN 3-88309-058-1
  - Volume 10 (Shelkov–Stoß, Andreas), Herzberg 1995, ISBN 3-88309-062-X
  - Volume 11 (Stoß, Veit–Tieffenthaler), Herzberg 1996, ISBN 3-88309-064-6
  - Volume 12 (Tibbon–Volpe), Herzberg 1997, ISBN 3-88309-068-9
  - Volume 13 (Voltaire–Wolfram von Eschenbach), Herzberg 1998, ISBN 3-88309-072-7
  - Volume 14 (Abachum–Zygomalas), Herzberg 1998, ISBN 3-88309-073-5
- Supplements
  - Volume 15, Herzberg 1999, ISBN 3-88309-077-8
  - Volume 16, Herzberg 1999, ISBN 3-88309-079-4
  - Volume 17, Herzberg 2000, ISBN 3-88309-080-8
  - Volume 18, Herzberg 2001, ISBN 3-88309-086-7
  - Volume 19, Nordhausen 2001, ISBN 3-88309-089-1
  - Volume 20, Nordhausen 2002, ISBN 3-88309-091-3
  - Volume 21, Nordhausen 2003, ISBN 3-88309-110-3
  - Volume 22, Nordhausen 2003, ISBN 3-88309-133-2
  - Volume 23, Nordhausen 2004, ISBN 3-88309-155-3
  - Volume 24, Nordhausen 2005, ISBN 3-88309-247-9
  - Volume 25, Nordhausen 2005, ISBN 3-88309-332-7
  - Volume 26, Nordhausen 2006, ISBN 3-88309-354-8
  - Volume 27, Nordhausen 2007, ISBN 3-88309-393-9
  - Volume 28, Nordhausen 2007, ISBN 978-3-88309-413-7
  - Volume 29, Nordhausen 2008, ISBN 978-3-88309-452-6
  - Volume 30, Nordhausen 2009, ISBN 978-3-88309-478-6
  - Volume 31, Nordhausen 2010, ISBN 978-3-88309-544-8
  - Volume 32, Nordhausen 2011, ISBN 978-3-88309-615-5
  - Volume 33, Nordhausen 2012, ISBN 978-3-88309-690-2
  - Volume 34, Nordhausen 2013, ISBN 978-3-88309-766-4
  - Volume 35, Nordhausen 2014, ISBN 978-3-88309-882-1
  - Volume 36, Nordhausen 2015, ISBN 978-3-88309-920-0
  - Volume 37, Nordhausen 2016, ISBN 978-3-95948-142-7
  - Volume 38, Nordhausen 2017, ISBN 978-3-95948-259-2
  - Volume 39, Nordhausen 2018, ISBN 978-3-95948-350-6
  - Volume 40, Nordhausen 2019, ISBN 9783959484268
  - Volume 41, Nordhausen 2020, ISBN 9783959484749
  - Volume 42, Nordhausen 2021, ISBN 9783959485050 henceforth with Uta Timpe-Bautz as (co-)editor
  - Volume 43, Nordhausen 2021, ISBN 9783959485364
  - Volume 44, Nordhausen 2022, ISBN 9783959485562
  - Volume 45, Nordhausen 2023, ISBN 9783959485845
  - Volume 46, Nordhausen 2023, ISBN 9783959485906

== Sources ==
- Bautz, Traugott (2018). "Mein Leben mit dem Biographisch-Bibliographischen Kirchenlexikon" [My life with the Biographisch-Bibliographischen Kirchenlexikon] (PDF). 50 Jahre Biographisch-Bibliographisches Kirchenlexikon: ein Weg in die Zukunft [50 years of the Biographisch-Bibliographischen Kirchenlexikon: a way into the future] (in German). Nordhausen: Verlag Traugott Bautz GmbH. pp. 15–28. ISBN 978-3-95948-351-3. Archived from the original (PDF) on 4 August 2021.
