= Martí de Barcelona =

Martí de Barcelona (the religious name of Jaume Bagunyà i Casanovas; c. 1895–1936) was a Catalan Capuchin historian.

== Biography ==
He was born in Barcelona in c. 1895. He entered the convent of the Sarrià Capuchins and got his degree in history at the Catholic university of Louvain. Since 1926 he was the director of the review Estudis Franciscans ("Franciscan Studies"). In 1924 he published Jaume Caresmar's Història de la primacia de la seu de Tarragona (History of the primacy of the Cathedral de Tarragona). He became specialized in Francesc Eiximenis, and he transcribed the Doctrina compendiosa in 1929, which in fact, as it was later proven, is attributed to Francesc Eiximenis, and even though the book is inspired by his thought and doctrines, it was not written directly by him. Together with the Capuchins Norbert d'Ordal and Feliu de Tarragona, they transcribed also three hundred fifty-two chapters of the Terç (third book) from Lo Crestià (1929–32). He also transcribed his interesting Ars Praedicandi Populo (Manual for the preaching to the people), that was discovered by him in Kraków. Moreover, he wrote several articles about medieval Catalan society and culture. He was murdered by the FAI's anarchists at the beginning of the Spanish Civil War. He was beatified in the cathedral of Barcelona on 21 November 2015 together with other Capuchins that had been also murdered during the religious persecution of 1936 in Montcada i Reixac.

== Works ==
=== Editions of Francesc Eiximenis' works ===
- Doctrina Compendiosa. Barcelona. Editorial Barcino. 1929. 157 pp. (in Catalan)

"Els Nostres Clàssics". Collection A, nº 24. Text and footnotes by Martí de Barcelona, OFMCap

- Terç del Crestià. Volum I. Barcelona. Editorial Barcino. 1929. 318 pp. (in Catalan)

Text and footnotes by Martí de Barcelona and Norbert d'Ordal, OFMCap "Els nostres clàssics". Collection B, nº 1.

- Terç del Crestià. Volum II. Barcelona. Editorial Barcino. 1930. 302 pp. (in Catalan)

Text and footnotes by Martí de Barcelona and Norbert d'Ordal, OFMCap "Els nostres clàssics". Collection B, nº 2.

- Terç del Crestià. Volum III. Barcelona. Editorial Barcino. 1932. 296 pp. (in Catalan)

Text and footnotes by Martí de Barcelona and Feliu de Tarragona, OFMCap "Els nostres clàssics". Collection B, nº 4.

- L'Ars Praedicandi de Fra Francesc Eiximenis. Martí de Barcelona, OFMCap In Homenatge a Antoni Rubió i Lluch. Miscel·lània d'Estudis Literaris, Històrics i Lingüístics. Vol. II. Barcelona. 1936. 301–40. (in Latin)

=== Other works ===
- Fra Francesc Eiximenis. O.M. (1340?-1409). La seva vida, els seus escrits, la seva personalitat literària. EF, XL. 1928. 437–500. (in Catalan)
- L'Església i l'Estat segons Francesc Eiximenis (I). Criterion, VII. October–December 1931. 325–38. (in Catalan)
- L'Església i l'Estat segons Francesc Eiximenis (II). Criterion, VIII. 1932. 337–47. (in Catalan)
- Notes descriptives dels manuscrits medievals de la Biblioteca Nacional de Madrid. EF, XLV. 1933. 337–404. (in Catalan)
- Catalunya vista per Francesc Eiximenis. EF, XLVI. 1934. 79–97. (in Catalan)
- Nous documents per a la biografia d'Arnau de Vilanova. AST XI. 1935. 85–128. (in Catalan)
- Regesta de documents arnaldians coneguts. EF, XLVII. 1935. 261–300. (in Catalan)
- La cultura catalana durant el regnat de Jaume II. EF XCI (1990), 213–295; XCII (1991), 127-245 and 383–492. (in Catalan)
