= North-American Catalan Society =

Learned society

North American Catalan Society
- Abbreviation: NACS
- Formation: 1978
- Founder: Josep Roca i Pons and others
- Type: Learned society
- Legal status: Active
- Purpose: Promotion of Catalan language and Catalan culture studies in North America
- Headquarters: United States
- Location: North America
- Region served: North America
- Official language: Catalan, English
- Main organ: Catalan Review: International Journal of Catalan Culture
- Remarks: Founded during the First Colloquium of Catalan Studies in North America at the University of Illinois Urbana–Champaign

The North American Catalan Society or NACS is a professional association that joins researchers, students and people in general, especially in the United States and Canada, that show or have interest in any aspect of culture from the Catalan Countries and the Catalan language (literature, linguistics, arts, history and philosophy, amongst others).

It was founded in 1978, during the First Colloquium of Catalan Studies in North America, that took place at the University of Illinois in Urbana-Champaign), and that was promoted by Josep Roca i Pons. The NACS is devoted to fostering studies about the Catalan language and its culture in the academic areas of North America. It also publishes the Catalan Review: International Journal of Catalan Culture.

In 1997, the Institute of Catalan Studies and the Catalan regional government granted the NACS the prestigious Ramon Llull prize for its fostering of Catalan culture internationally. In 1998 the NACS also received the Creu de Sant Jordi, (Saint George cross), a high distinction given by the regional Catalan government.

Its current president (for 2013-2015) is Lourdes Manyé, who teaches at Furman University.
