= Francesc Eiximenis =

Catalan philosopher (c.1330–1409)

Francesc Eiximenis OFM
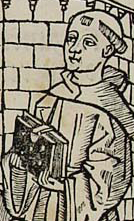
- Portait of Eiximenis from 1499
- Born: between 1330 and 1335; Girona
- Died: 1409; Perpignan
- Education: University of Oxford; University of Paris
- Occupation: Writer

Francesc Eiximenis (Catalan: [fɾənˈsɛsk əʃiˈmɛnis]; c. 1330 – 1409) was a Franciscan Catalan writer who lived in the 14th-century Crown of Aragon. He was possibly one of the more successful medieval Catalan writers since his works were widely read, copied, published and translated. Therefore, it can be said that both in the literary and in the political sphere he had a lot of influence. Among his readers were numbered important people of his time, such as the kings of the Crown of Aragon Peter IV, John I and Martin I, the queen Maria de Luna (wife of Martin I), and the Pope of Avignon Benedict XIII.

== Life ==
Francesc Eiximenis was born around 1330, possibly in Girona. When he was very young, he became a Franciscan and his education began in the Franciscan schools of Catalonia. Later, he attended the most important universities of Europe: the University of Oxford and the University of Paris. The University of Oxford influenced him notably, since the Franciscans had there an important school. Thus, several English Franciscans (and British authors in general) are the thinkers who most influenced Eiximenis, such as Robert Grosseteste (whom Eiximenis calls Linconiensis, since he was bishop of Lincoln), John of Wales, Richard Kilvington, Alexander of Hales, Richard of Middleton, Thomas Bradwardine, William of Ockham, and John Duns Scotus.

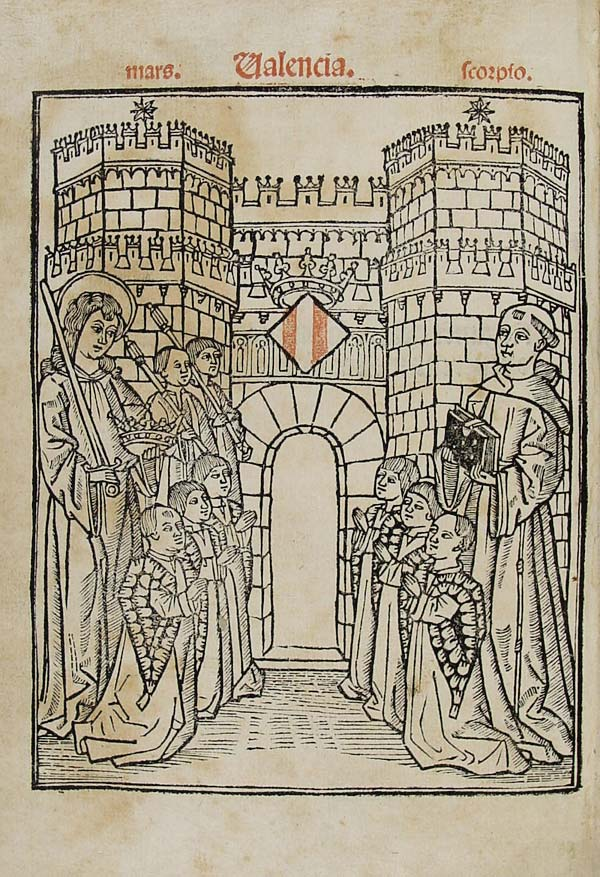
Title page of the incunable edition of the Regiment de la Cosa Pública (Valencia, Cristòfor Cofman, 1499). Francesc Eiximenis is on the right. He offers his book to the jurats of Valencia. On the left is the guardian angel of the city and kingdom of Valencia. The six Jurats de Valencia are kneeling in front of the Serrans gothic gate of the ancient wall of Valencia.

In 1371 there was an attempt to bring him to the University of Lleida as a teacher. But he lacked the title of Doctor in Theology (magister in sacra pagina), and so this attempt did not go further. Eiximenis acquired this title in 1374 at the University of Toulouse, with the financial help and support of the king Peter IV.

Eiximenis subsequently returned to the Principality of Catalonia, where he was considered very intellectual. He was on good terms with the Court of the Crown of Aragon and with the ruling social class of Barcelona and València. Most of his works were written in Valencia, where he stayed from 1382 to 1408. There he was consultant of the jurats (the city representatives) and of the Consell (ruling organ of the city).

In Valencia, Eiximenis' activity, besides his literary tasks, was tireless. The year 1391 was a very difficult one for the city and Kingdom of Valencia, since there were many social problems. Then Eiximenis organized a kind of "praying army" in some monasteries and convents around Valencia. In 1392 he and other people received the assignment of checking the Jewish books that were stolen during the 1391 pogrom. At the end of 1397 he was a member of a commission that would advise king Martin I about the Western Schism. In 1397 and 1398 he undertook the organization of two crusades of Valencians and Majorcans against the Muslim pirates of North Africa. In 1399 Eiximenis was also president of a commission that sought to unify all the schools of Valencia. The Consell (ruling organ of Valencia) rejected that in 1400, but this attempt was anyway a clear first step towards the University of Valencia, that was founded officially in 1499. The last years of Eiximenis in Valencia (1404–1408) were devoted to the foundation and endowment of the Franciscan convent of Sant Esperit (in Gilet, near Sagunto). This convent was founded by the queen Maria de Luna.

In 1408 Eiximenis took part in the Council of Perpignan. There the Pope of Avignon Benedict XIII appointed him first Patriarch of Jerusalem and later apostolic administrator (interim bishop) of the diocese of Elna (ancient name of the diocese of Perpignan).

Eiximenis died in Perpignan, then in the Principality of Catalonia, possibly on 23 April 1409.

== Works ==
=== In Catalan ===
Eiximenis wrote the following works in Catalan:

- Tractat d'usura (Treaty about Usury). Short treatise about usury according to the Canon Law. This matter was much debated in the Middle Ages by many scholars.
- Lo Crestià (The Christian). According to Curt Wittlin the name should be Lo Cristià. It was a huge project of Summa Theologica written in popular language. The original project consisted of 13 books, but only four were written:
  - Primer del Crestià (First of the Christian). It deals with the fundamentals of Christianity.
  - Segon del Crestià (Second of the Christian). It deals with the temptation.
  - Terç del Crestià (Third of the Christian). It deals with the different kinds of sins and their remedies.
  - Dotzè del Crestià (Twelfth of the Christian). It deals with government and politics in general. Nevertheless, the content is encyclopedic.
- Regiment de la cosa pública (Government of the Republic). It was a gift from Eiximenis to the jurats (representatives of the city) of Valencia, when he went to Valencia in 1383. It gives advice for good government. This work shows the influence of John of Wales' Communiloquium, according to Albert Hauf. This work was also included as the third part of the Dotzè del Crestià.
- Llibre dels àngels (Book of Angels). It is a very complete treatise about angelology but with several political thoughts. This book was dedicated to the Valencian knight Pere d'Artés.
- Llibre de les dones (Book of Women). It begins as just a book about women's education; but four-fifths of this work deal about theology and the fundamentals of Catholic morality. The book was dedicated to the countess of Prades, Sanxa Ximenes d'Arenós.
- Vida de Jesucrist (Life of Jesus Christ). It is a biography of Jesus Christ with theological thoughts and also contemplative content. This work was very much influenced by Pseudo-Bonaventure's Meditations on the Life of Christ and also by the vehement Franciscan Ubertino da Casale according to Albert Hauf. This book was also dedicated to the Valencian knight Pere d'Artés.
- Scala Dei or Tractat de contemplació (Stairs towards God or Treatise about Contemplation). It is a short treatise about morals and theology. This book was dedicated to the queen Maria de Luna.
- Two autograph letters in Catalan (from 15 July 1392 and 12 March 1396). The first (15 July 1392) was addressed to King Martin I (who at the time was only a prince), and is of interest since Eiximenis gives him advice in the letter about the good government of Sicily.

=== In Latin ===
Eiximenis wrote the following works in Latin:

- De Triplici Statu Mundi (About the three states of the world). It is a short eschatological treatise. There are doubts however, that Eiximenis is the author of this work.
- Allegationes (Statements). In Valencia there was a conflict between the Church and the State, and several important people were asked to express their opinion about that. This is the part that concerns Eiximenis. Here Eiximenis has a very strong theocratic point of view.
- A short part of his Summa Theologica. This extract is very short, and deals with some theological matters.
- Ars Praedicandi Populo (Manual for the preaching to the people). It is a very interesting manual about preaching.
- A sermon (or a part of it).
- Pastorale (Pastoral). It deals with advice for priests and bishops, and it follows the classical Saint Gregory's Pastorale. This book was dedicated to Hug de Llupià, bishop of Valencia.
- Psalterium alias Laudatorium Papae Benedicto XIII dedicatum (Psalter or Doxology Dedicated to Pope Benedict XIII). It is a very beautiful collection of 344 prayers. As the title shows, this book was dedicated to the Avignon pope Benedict XIII.

Two other books have been attributed to Eiximenis: the Cercapou, and the Doctrina compendiosa. The Doctrina Compendiosa shows however a very strong influence from Eiximenis' political theories. there was also an adaptation of Llibre de las Dones in Spanish, which was called Carro de las Donas.

Eiximenis' works had much success in his time, as evidenced by more than 200 manuscripts of his works that have survived. Another example was the Psaltiri devotíssim (Translation into Catalan of 100 out of the 344 prayers of the Psalterium alias Laudatorium). The incunabulum edition of this book had 2000 copies, i.e. more than double both editions of the Tirant lo Blanc (Valencia 1490 and Barcelona 1497). It was the biggest incunabulum edition of the whole medieval Catalan literature.

There were also a lot of translations during the 15th and 16th centuries. The Llibre de les Dones was translated into Spanish. One of the Spanish translations was used for the education of the four daughters of the Catholic Monarchs. The Llibre dels Àngels had great international success and was translated into several languages: Spanish, Latin, French and even Flemish (it was possibly the only book from the medieval Catalan literature that was translated into that language). And the Vida de Jesucrist was translated into Spanish and French.

There are finally two other examples that show the international spreading of Eiximenis' works. First of all, the French translation of the Llibre dels Àngels was the first book that in 1478 was printed in Geneva. Secondly, the Spanish translation of the Vida de Jesucrist was the first book that was printed in Granada in 1496 after the conquest of the city by the Catholic Monarchs.

Most of the modern editions of his works have been prepared by Curt Wittlin and by Albert Hauf.

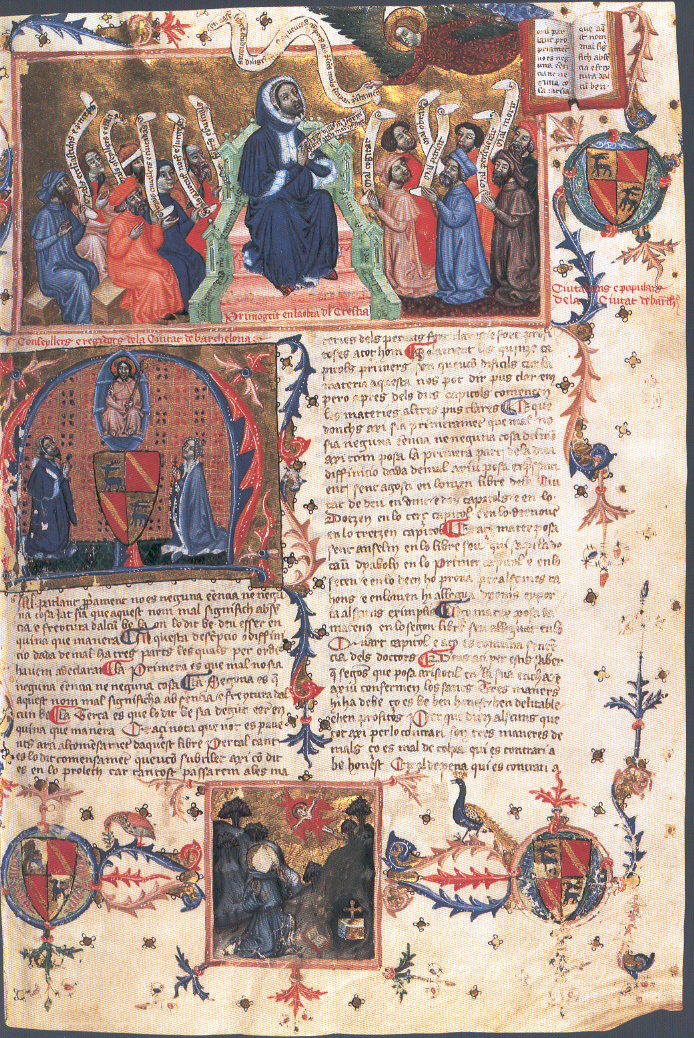
Beginning of the Terç del Crestià in the manuscript 1792 from the National Library of Madrid. This manuscript has the chapters 1-523 from this book (which has 1060 chapters in total).

=== Editions ===
==== Obres de Francesc Eiximenis – Complete Works of Francesc Eiximenis ====
- "Dotzè Llibre del Crestià. Part 1, Volum 1", Girona, Universitat, 2005, lxvii + 619 pp. (OFE, 1). Ed. by Xavier Renedo, Sadurní Martí et al. (in Catalan)
- "Dotzè Llibre del Crestià. Part 2, Volum 1", Girona, Universitat, 1986, xxxviii+ 518 pp. (OFE, 3). Ed. by Curt Wittlin et al. (in Catalan)
- "Dotzè Llibre del Crestià. Part 2, Volum 2", Girona, Universitat, 1987, 649 pp. (OFE, 4) Ed. by Curt Wittlin et al. (in Catalan)

==== Other editions ====
- Lo Llibre de les Dones (Barcelona, Curial, 1981. Ed. by Curt Wittlin. (in Catalan)
- De Sant Miquel Arcàngel (5è tractat del Llibre dels Àngels. Barcelona, Curial, 1983. Ed. by Curt Wittlin. (in Catalan)
- Psalterium alias Laudatorium (Toronto, PIMS, 1988. Ed. by Curt Wittlin. (in Latin and English)
- Àngels e demonis (Quart tractat del Llibre dels Àngels). Barcelona, Quaderns Crema, 2003. Ed. by Sadurní Martí. (in Catalan)

==== Anthologies ====
- Llibres, mestres i sermons. Antologia de textos. Barcelona, Barcino, 2005. Ed. by David Guixeras and Xavier Renedo, 268 pp. (in Catalan)
- "Francesc Eiximenis. An Anthology. Barcelona/Woodbridge: Barcino/Tamesis, 2008. Transl. by Robert Hughes. (in English)

=== Digital editions of his works ===
==== Manuscripts ====
- First half (chapters 1-523) of the Terç del Crestià (BNC, ms. 457). (in Catalan)
- Llibre dels Àngels (University of Barcelona, Fons de reserva, ms. 86). (in Catalan)
- Vida de Jesucrist (BNC, mss. 459-460). (in Catalan)
- Scala Dei (University of Barcelona, Fons de reserva, ms. 88). (in Catalan)

==== Incunabula ====
- Primer del Crestià (Valencia, Lambert Palmart, 1483). (in Catalan)
- First half (chapters 1-473) of the Dotzè del Crestià (Valencia, Lambert Palmart, 1484). (in Catalan)
- Regiment de la cosa pública, (Valencia, Cristòfor Cofman, 1499). (in Catalan)
- Llibre dels àngels, (Barcelona, Joan Rosembach, 1494). (in Catalan)
- Llibre de les Dones, (Barcelona, Joan Rosembach, 1495). (in Catalan)
- Translation into Spanish of the Vida de Jesucrist, (Granada, Meinard Ungut and Johannes Pegnitzer, 1496). (in Spanish)
- Translation into Spanish of the Llibre dels àngels (The title is Libro de los santos ángeles. Burgos, Fadrique de Basilea, 1490). (in Spanish)
- Pastorale (Barcelona, Pere Posa, 1495). (in Latin)
- Scala Dei (Barcelona, Diego de Gumiel, 1494). (in Catalan)
- Translation into French of the Llibre dels Àngels (Geneva, Adam Steinschaber, 1478). (in French)
- Translation into French of the Llibre dels Àngels (Lyon, Guillaume Le Roy, 1486). (in French)

==== Old editions ====
- Translation into Spanish of the Llibre dels Àngels (The title is La Natura Angélica. Alcalá de Henares, Miguel de Eguía, 1527). (in Spanish)

==== Modern editions and transcripts ====
- Gascón Urís, Sergi. "Les cartes episcopals de Francesc Eiximenis (I)", in Actas del Congreso Internacional de la AHLM (A Coruña, 18-22 de setembre de 2001), vol. II, Universidade de Santiago de Compostela-Touxosoutos, S.L., Coruña 2005, pp. 337–52. ISBN 978-84-96259-74-4. D.L.: C-2072-2005.
- Gascón Urís, Sergi. "La 'Crònica d'Aragón' (València 1524) i les cartes autògrafes d'Eiximenis", in Actes del Dotzè Col·loqui Internacional de Llengua i Literatura Catalanes. Barcelona: Publicacions de l'Abadia de Montserrat, vol. 2 (2003), pp. 31–45. ISBN 978-84-8415-524-9.
- Gascón Urís, Sergi. Estudi de manuscrits i incunables del Llibre dels àngels. Tesina (TFG) (UAB, Bellaterra, 1988).
- Gascón Urís, Sergi. "Estudi codicològic i edició paleogràfica d'un nou bifoli del 'Libre dels Àngels' d'Eiximenis (Arxiu del Monestir de Sant Pere de les Puel·les)", in Homenatge a Joseph Gulsoy: [Estudis de Llengua i Literatura Catalanes, LV, Vol. 2, 2007, ISBN 978-84-8415-897-4, pàgs. 33-72.
- Gasccón Urís, Sergi. Edició crítica del Libre dels àngels (1392) de Francesc Eiximenis. Introducció, catàleg de manuscrits, índexs d'autors, toponímic, bíblic i temàtic. Doctorate thesis (UAB, Bellaterra, 1992). Microfiche edition (UAB, Bellaterra, 1993). ISBN 978-84-7929-371-0. [BAV, Cataloghi: https://opac.vatlib.it/all/search?sm=os&k_v=sergi+gascon+uris&k_f=0; UB, BC, URL: BMontserrat, UG].
- Pastorale. Transcript and translation into Catalan. Montserrat Martínez Checa's doctorate thesis (UAB, Bellaterra, 1994). (in Latin and Catalan)
- De triplici statu mundi (Edition by Albert Hauf). (in Latin)
- Summa theologica (Edition by León Amorós, OFM). (in Latin)
- Autograph letters (15.07.1392 and 12.03.1396. Edition by Sadurní Martí). (in Catalan)
- Psalterium alias Laudatorium (Toronto, PIMS, 1988. Edition by Curt Wittlin). (in Latin and English)
- Lo Llibre de les Dones (Barcelona, Curial, 1981. Edition by Curt Wittlin). (in Catalan)
- De Sant Miquel Arcàngel (5th treaty from the Llibre dels Àngels. Barcelona, Curial, 1983. Edition by Curt Wittlin). (in Catalan)

==== Complete works ====
- Francesc Eiximenis' complete works (in Catalan, Latin, and Spanish)
