= Albert Hauf =

Majorcan literary critic

Albert Guillem Hauf i Valls (born 1938 in Sóller, Mallorca, Spain) is a Majorcan philologist, literature historian and literary critic. He is a specialist in Catalan and Occitan medieval literature.

== Life ==
He graduated in romance Philology in the University of Barcelona, with a grant from the Joan March Foundation. His degree dissertation consisted of an edition of the Aragonese text of the Agriculture Treatise of Palladius Rutilius Emilianus. In the same university he obtained his PhD, which was supervised by professor Martí de Riquer, with a thesis on the Vita Christi, a work of the medieval Catalan writer Francesc Eiximenis, and the medieval tradition of the Vitae Christi. This work received the Nicolau d'Olwer prize (given by the IEC) in 1977.

In 1964 he moved to Cardiff University (Wales) as a lecturer in Spanish and Catalan, and subsequently was made a professor of Hispanic Studies. He initiated courses of Catalan language and literature at Cardiff. His disagreement with the policy of the British Prime Minister Margaret Thatcher forced him to abandon the United Kingdom in 1987, when he joined the University of Valencia, where he is professor of Catalan Philology.

Since 1992 he has supervised a variety of research projects, which have been sponsored by the Spanish Ministry of Culture and by the Valencian Culture Department, concerned especially with the golden age of Valencian literature (15th century). He supervised sixteen doctorate theses up to 2007. He has organized several congresses and academical meetings: The cultural atmosphere in Valencia during the second half of the 15th century, Tirant lo Blanc and its translators, Tirant lo Blanc, James I, Ausiàs Marc, Ausiàs Marc's readings, Francesc Eiximenis, Joan Roís de Corella, The medieval historiography.

He is a member of the Valencian Academy of the Language, the Interuniversity Institute of Valencian Philology and the Institute of Catalan Studies. He was founder and president of the International Association of Catalan Language and Literature.

In addition, he has been a member of the Valencian Institute of Studies and Research (succeeding Joan Fuster), of the Anglo-Catalan Society executive board (1973–1978), of the University of Valencia senate (1995–2001); of the Madrid National Library executive board (1995–1997); of the Mossèn Alcover trust (2001); of the jury of the Premis Octubre Essay Joan Fuster prizes (1989 and 1991) and the Letters National Prizes of the Spanish Ministry of Culture (Essay, 1991 and 1992; Novel, 1993; Literature, 1998); of the edition commission of the Francesc Eiximenis' works; of the edition commission of the Ramon Llull's works; of the editorial staff of the following journals: Estudis Romànics, Caplletra, Llengua i Literatura and of the ELLC; of the consultant board of the following journals: Révue d'Études Catalanes (France), Tesserae (United Kingdom), Catalan Review (United States), Afers, Studia Philologica Valentina and Ausa.

== Works ==
He has written numerous articles for journals, both popular and scientific, and has also taken part in radio and TV programs. He has worked with Martí de Riquer and Mario Vargas Llosa in a CDR about Joanot Martorell's Tirant lo Blanch.

He is the author of around two hundred research works, which appear listed in ELL, 4 (1998), 261–271. The following may be noted:

- Speculum Humanae Salvationis edition.
- Teresa Pérez Higuera and Albert Hauf i Valls' Estudios y comentarios, Madrid, Edilán, 2000, 2 vols.
- Isabel de Villena's Vita Christi, Barcelona, Ed. 62, 1995.
- Speculum Animae edition, which is attributed to Isabel de Villena, Madrid, Edilán, 1993, 2 vols.
- D'Eiximenis a Sor Isabel de Villena. Aportació a l'estudi de la nostra cultura medieval, Biblioteca Sanchis Guarner, 19, València-Barcelona, 1990 (Serra d'Or Critics prize, 1991).
- Tirant lo Blanch edition, 2 vols., Valencia, Generalitat Valenciana, 1992 and 1990.
- La Flor de les Istòries d'Orient, Barcelona, 1989 (1990 Massó i Torrent prize, for the best work about mediaeval matter).
- Joan Eiximeno's Quarantena de Contemplació, Abadia de Montserrat, 1986.
- Contemplació de la Passió, Barcelona, 1983.
- Francesc Eiximenis' Lo Crestià, Barcelona, Ed. 62, 1983.
- El Ars Praedicandi de Fr. Alfonso d'Alprao, Rome, 1979. An edition of the work of Afonso de Alprão.
- Introductions for José Pou's, Visionarios, beguinos y fraticelos, Alicante, 1996, 9–112; and for Joan Fuster's, Misògins i enamorat, Alzira, 1995.
- 25 articles from him that have been published in the Grundriss der Romanischen Literaturen des Mittlealters, XI/2, Heidelberg, 1993. * Among his translations from German, English and French, may be noted the Spanish version of Arthur Terry's, Catalan Literature: Literatura Catalana, Barcelona-Caracas. México, 1977 i 1983, which has also an additional bibliography.
