= Council of Perpignan =

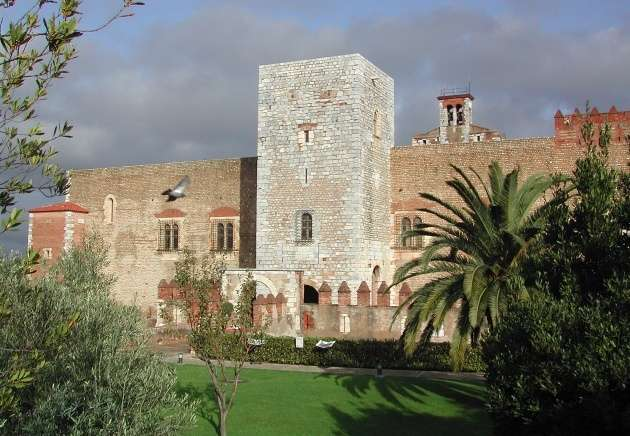
Palace of the Kings of Majorca (Perpignan)

The Council of Perpignan, which was intended to be a general council of the entire Catholic Church, was convened in November 1408, by the French "Antipope" Benedict XIII of the Avignon Obedience. The site of the council was the city of Perpignan, which belonged to the Crown of Aragon, which was still in the Avignon Obedience after the withdrawal of French support from Benedict XIII in 1408.

== The choice of Perpignan ==
Pope Benedict's most influential and vigorous supporter in France, the Duke of Orléans, had been assassinated on 27 November 1407. This left the way free for the opposition, in particular the University of Paris, to press its case upon King Charles 'the Mad'. On 12 January 1408, the King wrote to Benedict that, unless a union between the two parts of the schism had been ended by Ascension Day (forty days after Easter), France would declare neutrality between the two Popes. Benedict threatened in return that, unless the King retracted his declaration, the Pope would publish a bull which he had already prepared which would excommunicate anyone (the King presumably included) who attempted to withdraw obedience. The bull was entirely traditional in content, having been drawn up by Pope Benedict, a former professor of Canon Law. The bull was delivered on 18 May 1408, and turned out to be a major tactical mistake. It gave the leaders of the University of Paris the chance to charge those who had carried the bull to be guilty of high treason, and Benedict to be guilty of an attack on the royal dignity and national honor. The King was induced to proclaim the neutrality of France in the schism. Benedict had been at Porto Venere, near Livorno, when he received the news, and, fearful that the French governor of Genoa, Marshal Boucicault, might attempt to seize him, as he had previously threatened, decided to seek safer ground beyond immediate French control. Before leaving Italy, Pope Benedict XIII issued the Bull Celestis altitudo on 15 June 1408, summoning a council, to meet on 1 November 1408 at Perpignan. Pressured by events, Pope Gregory XII of the Roman Obedience, who was in exile from Rome, announced that he too would hold a council, after Easter of 1409, and that it would be held somewhere in the province of Aquileia or in the Exarchate of Ravenna.

Perpignan was chosen by Benedict XIII because it was situated within the lands of the Crown of Aragon, but near to France, formerly the most important country of Benedict's Obedience. This council was intended to anticipate the action of the planned Council of Pisa, which was organised to end the long-continued Western Schism. The French King not only withdrew obedience and undertook neutrality, but forbade any French prelate or other person from attending a council to be held by Benedict XIII.

Benedict and his suite reached Collioure, the harbor of Perpignan, on 15 July. He immediately wrote letters to each of the absent cardinals of the Avignon Obedience, pointing out that, even though it was not the custom to summon cardinals to a general council, since they were honorable members of the pope's own body and should not be absent from him, nonetheless, he was mandating that they be present at the council at Perpignan. The letter was sent to: Guy de Malsec (Palestrina), Niccolò Brancaccio (Albano), Jean Allarmet de Brogny (Ostia), Pierre Girard de Podio (Tusculum), Petrus de Tureyo (Santa Susanna), Pedro Fernández de Frías (Santa Prassede), Amedeo Saluzzo (Santa Maria Nuova), Petrus Blavi (Sant'Angelo in Pescheria), and Louis de Bar (Sant'Agatha).

== Opening of the Council ==
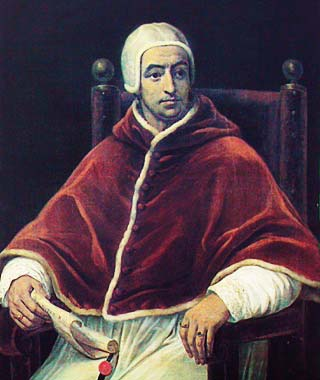
Benedict XIII, by Henri Serrur (1794–1865)

On 31 October 1408, Benedict XIII issued a decree postponing the opening of his Council until 15 November. On 15 November, the Pope descended from the fortress of Perpignan, where he lived, and made his way on foot to the Church of S. Maria de Regali, where the council fathers and a huge assembly of clergy and laity awaited him. He celebrated a Mass of the Holy Spirit, and the Bishop of Olora, Sancho Mulerii, O.P. preached the sermon. Cardinal Ludovico Fieschi read a message authorized by the Pope, stating that, since the agenda had not been completed, the second session was postponed until Saturday, 17 November. On the 17th, the Pope again attended, and, after the customary religious ceremonies, he gave a speech and then had Cardinal Fieschi read out a confession of faith. The date of the next meeting, Wednesday, 21 November, was announced.

At the third session on 21 November, Benedict XIII noted in his speech that the Council had been summoned pro sedatione huius (h)orrendi scismatis et unione ac debita reformatione status ecclesiae, quantum nobis est possibile. Toward that end the Pope had prepared a narrative of all that had happened up to that point, which he had read to the assembly by Cardinal Antonio de Chalant, the former Chancellor of the Count of Savoy. Seven sessions of the Council were taken up with the reading of that document.

The tenth session took place on 5 December 1408, in which the Pope had read three protestations of his right, of 1399, 1407 and 1408.

The Fathers of the council were badly divided between those who wanted Benedict to resign without further delay, and those who on no account wanted a resignation. To resolve their differences, a committee of sixty persons (then thirty, then ten) was appointed. The members included two cardinals, the Patriarch of Antioch, the Archbishops of Tarragona and of Saragossa, the Chancellor of the King of Castile, the Bishop of Valencia, the Bishop of Mende, the Bishop of Condom, and the Master General of the Dominicans, Joannes de Podionuncis. In the meantime many of the participants left the Council. The committee of ten had the Patriarch of Constantinople present a report to the Pope on 1 February 1409. They recommended that the Way of Renunciation not be used, except as a last resort; they recommended that Benedict be prepared to resign, especially in the case that his opponent were to be deposed; they recommended that Benedict should send nuncios to Pisa and to the Cardinals, with plenipotentiary powers to make arrangements for the peace of the Church; and they recommended that the Pope should take measures that, should he die before the completion of the Council, its work would not have been futile.

At the session of 26 March 1409, which was held in the citadel of Perpignan, since the majority of the Council Fathers had departed, the Pope prorogued the Council until 15 August. Before he did, however, he named seven nuncios to go to Pisa, but the powers he allowed them were not the plenipotentiary powers that the committee had suggested. Because the embassy could not get a safe-conduct through French territory, they were late arriving at Pisa. As to the Council, there were additional prorogations, which are listed by Ehrle, down to January 1416. The existence of a Council, even in recess, was a useful weapon in Benedict's arsenal.

On 5 June 1409 Benedict XIII and Gregory XII were deposed by the Council of Pisa.

=== Attendance ===
Only three cardinals of the Avignon Obedience followed Benedict XIII to Perpignan: Jean Flandrin (Sabina), Ludovico Fieschi (S. Adriano), and Antoine de Chalant (S. Maria in Via Lata). The others had summoned the Council of Pisa. On 22 September 1408, therefore, Benedict created five new cardinals: Pierre Ravat (Archbishop of Toulouse), Iohannes Martinez de Murillo (Abbot of Montisaragonum), Karolus Urriés, Alfonso de Carillo (Administrator of the diocese of Osma), and Jean d'Armagnac (Archbishop of Rouen, who did not accept the appointment). To enhance the appearance of universality, the Pope also created three new Patriarchs on 13 November: Alfonso Exea of Constantinople, Jean of Antioch (who had been Sacristan in the Cathedral Chapter of Maguelone), and Francisco Ximenes of Jerusalem.

The Council of Perpignan was attended only by three hundred ecclesiastics, mostly Spanish.

No action was taken by the council worthy of notice.

== Bibliography ==
- Christophe, Jean Baptiste (1853). Histoire de la papauté pendant le xive siècle (in French). Vol. Tome troisième. Paris: L. Maison. pp. 279–291. [partisan, hostile to Benedict XIII]
- Creighton, Mandell (1882). A History of the Papacy During the Period of the Reformation. Vol. I: The Great Schism. The Council of Constance. 1378-1418. London: Longmans, Green. pp. 193–199.
- Ehrle, Franz. "Aus den Acten des Afterconcils von Perpignan 1408," Archiv fur Literatur- und Kirchengeschichte 5 (1889), pp. 394–464.
- Ehrle, Franz. "Aus den Acten des Afterconcils von Perpignan 1408," Archiv fur Literatur- und Kirchengeschichte 7 (1900), pp. 576–694. [List of attendees: pp. 669–686]
- Hefele, Karl Joseph von (1874). Histoire des conciles d'après les documents originaux Tome dixième (Paris: Adrien Le Clerc 1874), pp. 244–247. (in French)
- Hefele, Carl Joseph von. Conciliengeschichte Sechster Band. Zweite Auflage (ed. Alois Knöpfler) (Freiburg im Breisgau: Herder 1890), pp. 988–991. (in German, Fraktur)
- Pillement, Georges (1955). Pedro de Luna: le dernier pape d'Avignon (in French). Paris: Hachette.
