= John of Wales =

Franciscan theologian

John of Wales (died c. 1285), also called John Waleys and Johannes Guallensis, was a Franciscan theologian who wrote several well-received Latin works, primarily preaching aids.

Born between 1210 and 1230, almost certainly in Wales, John joined the Franciscan order, and incepted in theology at the University of Oxford sometime before 1258. After this, he taught there until 1270 when he moved to the University of Paris, where he remained until his death around 1285. He was a moral theologian and a great admirer of the ancient world, incorporating many classical authors into his works. He is often considered a forerunner of later Christian humanists. His works were translated into six languages and were in print before the end of the 15th century.

== Works by John of Wales ==
- Breviloquium de virtutibus antiquorum principum et philosophum ( = A Brief Discourse on the Virtues of Ancient Princes and Philosophers). Probably composed in the 1260s. Survives in over 150 Latin manuscripts. This collection of moral exempla, similar in form to a speculum principum, is structured around the four cardinal virtues (Justice, Prudence, Temperance, and Fortitude), each divided into further sub-virtues.
- Communiloquium or Summa collationum, which is a kind of manual for priests and preachers, and which was also translated into Catalan in the 14th century. Composed after the Breviloquium de virtutibus, probably before 1270. Survives in at least 144 Latin manuscripts. The work is divided into seven parts, dealing with (1) the state (respublica) and its members, including the prince; (2) relations between different members of society, (3) admonitions for various societal groups (e.g. by gender, age, spiritual condition), (4) admonitions for various groups of churchmen, (5) admonitions for scholars and philosophers, (6) admonitions for those in the religious and monastic life, and finally, (7) admonitions for all concerning death.
  - Digital edition of the incunabulum edition of Cologne 1472
  - Digital edition of the incunabulum edition of Ulm 1481
  - Digital edition of the incunabulum edition of Strasbourg 1489
- Ordinarium seu Alphabetum vitae religiosae. Probably written in the late 1260s. Survives in 44 Latin manuscripts.
- Compendiloquium de vitis illustrium philosophorum et de dictis moralibus eorundem ( = A Compendium of the Lives of Illustrious Philosophers and of Their Moral Sayings), which is a summary of the history of philosophy. Probably written in Paris, sometime after 1272. Survives in 27 Latin manuscripts.
- Breviloquium de philosophia sive sapientia sanctorum (= A Brief Discourse on the Philosophy or Wisdom of the Saints), translated into Catalan in the 15th century. Probably written in Paris, sometime after 1272. Survives in 23 Latin manuscripts.

The above works were printed together in an incunabulum edition (Venice, 1496) under the title Summa de regimine vitae humanae, seu Margarita doctorum.

John also composed a number of other theological works, including a guide to preaching (Ars praedicandi), sermons, and Biblical commentaries.
