= Curt Wittlin =

Swiss philologist (1941–2019)

Curt Wittlin (13 April 1941, Reinach, Basel-Landschaft – 23 September 2019, Tortosa) was a Swiss philologist and an expert of medieval Catalan language and literature.

== Biography ==
Wittlin studied romance philology in Basel with Germà Colon, and later in Paris, Florence and Barcelona. He got his PhD in 1965 with a thesis about the Catalan translation of Brunetto Latini's Treasure by Guillem de Copons. He became Professor of Romance Philology and Historical Linguistics at the University of Saskatchewan in Saskatoon (Canada), where he arrived in 1967.

He became a specialist in the edition of medieval translations in Europe of texts by Cicero, Saint Augustine and John of Wales, among others. He also worked on Ramon Llull and on the history of medieval Catalan libraries. The Catalan writer to which he devoted most of his life was Francesc Eiximenis. Wittlin published most of the modern editions of Francesc Eiximenis' works and wrote many studies and articles about Eiximenis.

In 1997 he became a member of the Institute of Catalan Studies and from 1990 to 1993 he was president of the North American Catalan Society. In 2000 he received the Creu de Sant Jordi (Saint George cross), a high distinction given by the regional Catalan government.

== Works ==
- Lo llibre de les dones d'Eiximenis (1980) with F. Naccarato
- Repertori d'expressions multinominals i de grups de sinònims en traduccions catalanes antigues (Lluis Nicolau d'Olwer price, 1989)
- La geometria secreta del tapís de Girona in Revista de Girona, 1991
- De la traducció literal a la creació literària (Serra d'Or prize 1996)
- Entorn de les edicions de textos medievals in Estudis Romànics, 2004
