= Lo Crestià =

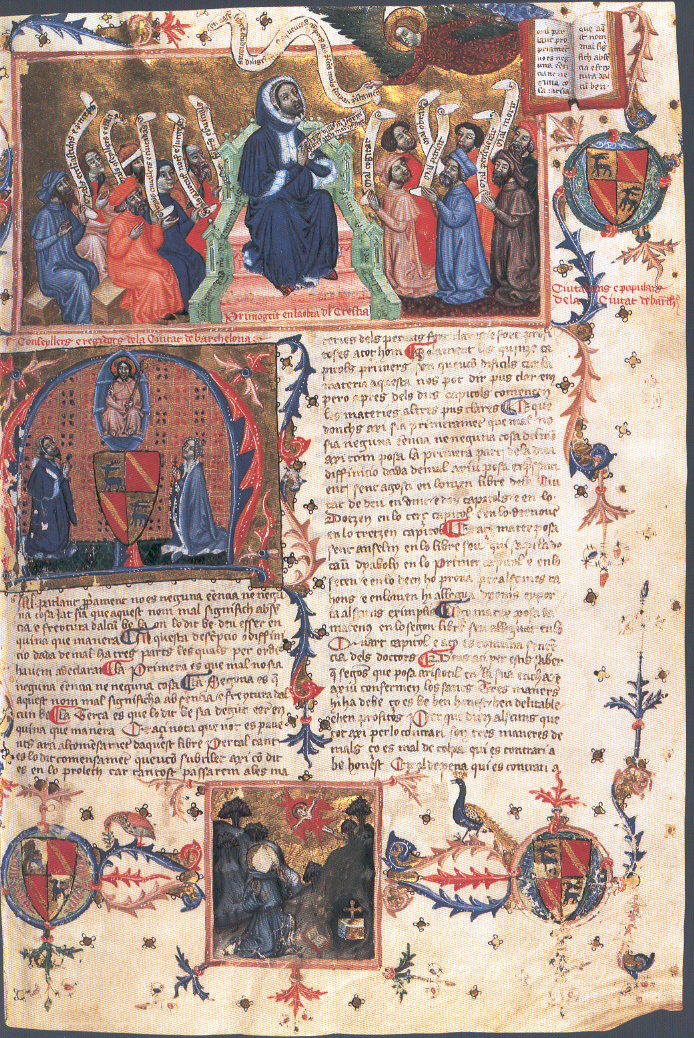
Beginning of the Terç del Crestià in the manuscript 1792 from the National Library of Madrid. This manuscript has the chapters 1-523 from this book (which has totally 1060 chapters).

Lo Crestià (English: The Christian) was an encyclopaedia written in Catalan, that was sponsored by the king Peter IV of Aragon and written by Francesc Eiximenis between 1379 and 1392. The first book and the half of the twelfth one (Dotzè in Catalan) were printed by the German printer Lambert Palmart in Valencia in 1483 and 1484.

According to Curt Wittlin the name should be Lo Cristià. Originally it should have consisted of thirteen books, that would have explained "in short all the foundations of Christianism" in order to encourage the study of theology among the laymen. Nowadays it can be considered as an encyclopaedia of mediaeval life. Lo Crestià is a universal work, that marks an important stage in the western history of literature: it is the last mediaeval Summa Theologica, and it is also one of the first works of didactic and theological literature in Europe, that is not written in Latin.

== General project ==
The general project of this work, which appears in chapter 4 of the introduction Lo Crestià, is the following:

- The first book a general and apologetic introduction to Christianism.
- The second book temptation.
- The third book evil and the different kinds of sins.
- The fourth book the man's freedom to do good or evil, and the help that God gives him in order to do good.
- The fifth book the three theological virtues: Faith, hope and love.
- The sixth book four cardinal virtues: Prudence, justice, temperance and courage.
- The seventh book the ten commandments.
- The eighth book the order of things and creatures according to medieval mentality.
- The ninth book the incarnation.
- The tenth book the sacraments.
- The eleventh book the different kinds of clergy.
- The twelfth book the government of the community.
- The thirteenth book Eschatology and the end of the world, and the reward or punishment that people will then receive, according to medieval mentality.

From the original project, only four books were written: the first three, which are devoted to matters of morality and theology, and the twelfth, which deals with politics, the ideal government of the "republic", princes and their subjects. Nevertheless, most of the matters of the rest of the books of Lo Crestià that were not finally written are scattered through other Eiximenis' works.

== Volumes ==
=== First volume ===
The first volume, or Primer del Crestià was written between 1379 and 1381. It is a general introduction to the Christian religion, which includes an apology against Islam and Judaism. It is divided into four parts, which have a different lengths. It has three hundred and seventy-six chapters, together with five more, which are a kind of general introduction to all Lo Crestià, and so it has three hundred and eighty-one chapters in total. The interest of Peter IV in this book was so great, that he gave orders to keep Eiximenis going out of his convent "until he has not finished the job".

=== Second volume ===
The second volume, or Segon del Crestià was written between 1382 and 1383. It deals with the problem of temptation. It consists of two hundred and forty chapters.

=== Third volume ===
The third volume, or Terç del Crestià was written in 1384. It is divided into twelve treatises, each with a different length, and has one thousand and sixty chapters. It deals with the concepts of evil and sin, and it shows with a great deal of detail the seven deadly sins and the sins of the tongue, thus enlarging some matters that appear in the second volume. This volume includes the part How to use properly of the food and the drinks (Com usar bé de beure e menjar) that, even though it does not include recipes, can be used as a guide in order to know all about that time's gastronomy, such as the service at the table, the protocol and the moral rules that were used when having a meal around a table

=== Twelfth volume ===
The twelfth volume, or Dotzè del Crestià was written between 1385 and 1392. It is divided into eight parts, and has a total of nine hundred and seven chapters. It deals with the foundations of government in cities and communities.

== Digital editions of Lo Crestià ==
=== Manuscripts ===
- First half (chapters 1–523) of the Terç del Crestià (BNC, ms. 457).

=== Incunabula ===
- Primer del Crestià (Valencia, Lambert Palmart, 1483).
- First half (chapters 1–473) of the Dotzè del Crestià (Valencia, Lambert Palmart, 1484).

=== Lo Crestià inside the complete works on line ===
- Francesc Eiximenis' complete works (in Catalan and Latin).
