= Edgar (disambiguation) =

Edgar is a masculine given name that may also be a family name.

Edgar may also refer to:

== Arts and entertainment ==
- Edgar (opera), an opera by Giacomo Puccini
- Edgar Award, an award presented yearly by the Mystery Writers of America
- edgar, a play by David Grimm
- Edgar, a song by Jean Leloup
- Edgar, a band with Nikki Leonti
- Parokya ni Edgar, Filipino alternative rock band

== Places ==
=== Canada ===
- Edgar, Ontario, a ghost town

=== United States ===
- Edgar, Illinois, an unincorporated community
- Edgar, Nebraska, a city
- Edgar, West Virginia
- Edgar, Wisconsin, a village
- Edgar County, Illinois, a county
- Edgar Township (disambiguation), multiple places
- Edgar Peak, a mountain in California

== People ==
- Edgar (footballer, born 1986), Gladson do Nascimento, Brazilian football forward
- Edgar (footballer, born 1987), Edgar Bruno da Silva, Brazilian football striker
- Edgar (footballer, born 1991), Edgar dos Passos Pinto, Brazilian football right-back
- King Edgar (disambiguation)

== Other uses ==
- Emission Database for Global Atmospheric Research (EDGAR)
- EDGAR, a filing format system of the U.S. Securities and Exchange Commission
- Edgar (restaurant), former brunch restaurant in Gatineau, Quebec
- HMS Edgar, ships of the Royal Navy of the United Kingdom
- Edgar-class cruiser, a nine-ship class of protected cruiser built around 1891 for the Royal Navy
- Edgar cut, a hairstyle with front hair having straight fringes, or bangs, with the sides tapered.
- Edgar, standard botanical author abbreviation for Elizabeth Edgar

== See also ==
- Eadgar (disambiguation)
- Edgars (disambiguation)
- Edgard (disambiguation)
- Edgardo, the Italian-language form of Edgar
