= Sarrià Capuchins =

Spanish Church

Coordinates: 41.393722°N 2.120173°E

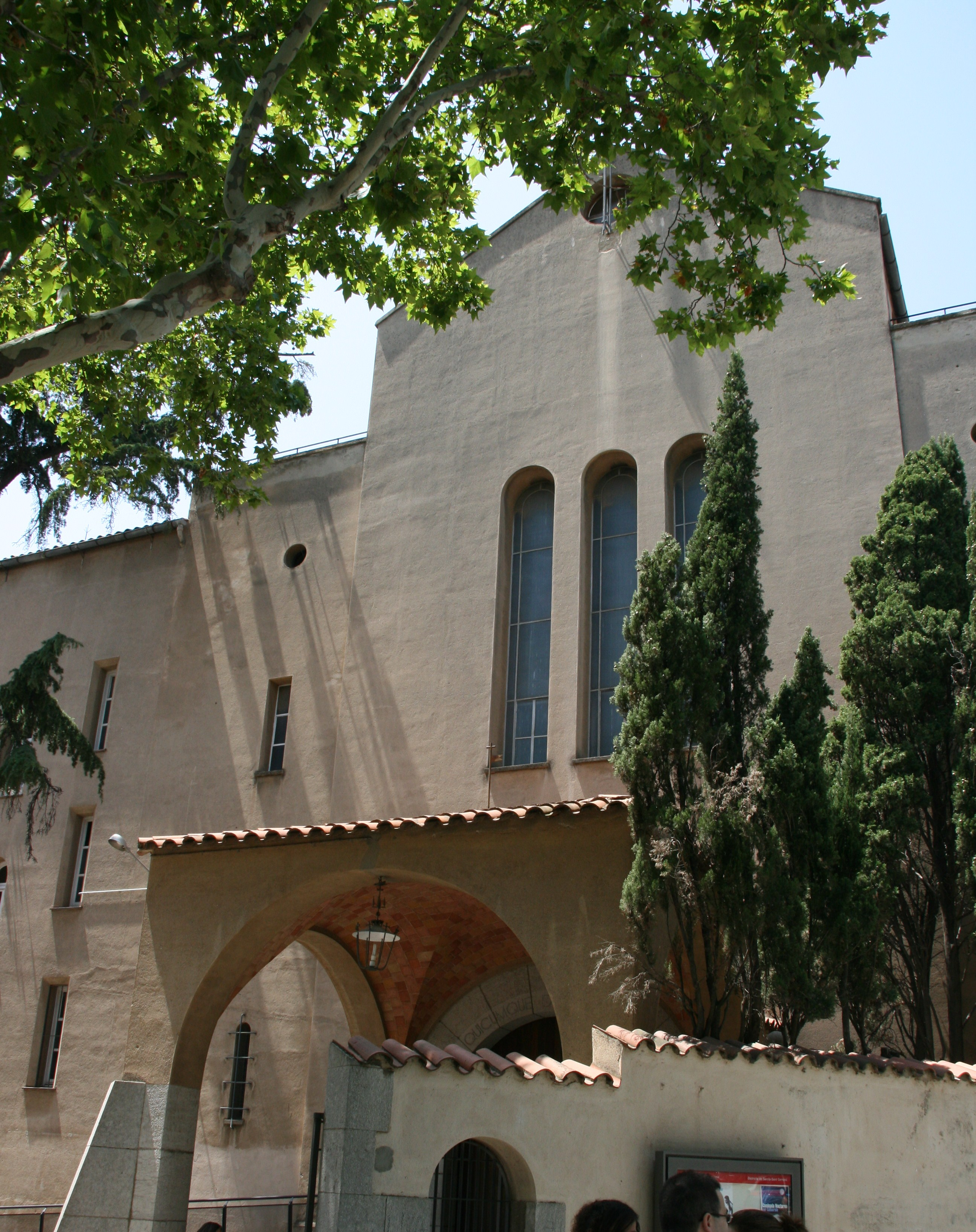
Façade of the church of the Sarrià Capuchins

The Sarrià Capuchins are a community of the Capuchins that settled in Barcelona in 1578 after a request of the Consell de Cent (ancient city rulers of Barcelona), and against the will of the king Philip II.

== History ==
=== Beginnings ===
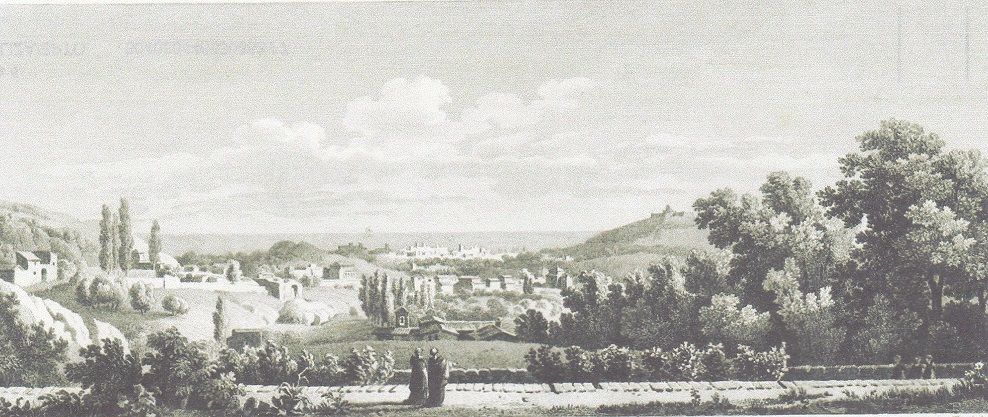
View of Barcelona from the convent of the Capuchins in the Desert of Sarrià

After a request of the Consell de Cent (ancient city rulers of Barcelona) in 1578, some Capuchins from Italy came to Barcelona, and they settled in the hermitage of Santa Madrona near Montjuïc. After a short period, they stayed for another short period in Sant Gervasi de Cassoles, but just in the same year the friars moved to a place called the Desert of Sarrià (in this context Desert means uninhabited place), where there was a chapel for Saint Eulalia, that had been built during the 15th century. it had been traditionally considered the birthplace of this martyr of Barcelona. Thus, in 1578, this place was given to the Capuchin friars so that they could found a convent of their order. This convent was the first one from their order in the Iberian Peninsula. This first Capuchin convent coexisted with the one of Montcalvari, that was also founded during those years outside the walls of Barcelona. During the 1714 siege in the War of the Spanish Succession the convent was taken by the army, but most of the Capuchins could remain in order to fulfil its religious duties, and the place was respected.

The convent of Sarrià was therefore the first one of the Capuchins in the Iberian Peninsula, and it disappeared in 1835 with the seizure of goods from the church during the ecclesiastical confiscations of Mendizábal. The lands were acquired by the Italian Enrico Sisley. He got them in a rather not fully legal way and without any logical explanation.

=== Restoration ===
After some years and failed attempts, the Ponsich family from Sarrià donated the present lands, where the convent began to be built in 1887. Since 1900, it became the center of the provincial curia and studies center. It became also a center of culture, that was frequently visited by important intellectuals in the beginning of the 20th century in Catalonia, such as Josep Carner, Carles Riba, Jaume Bofill, Francesc Pujols and Francesc Cambó. The convent was also an important center of biblical studies, with leading figures such as Antoni M. de Barcelona or Marc de Castellví. Miquel d'Esplugues was president of the Catalan Biblical Foundation, which, among other works, made the translation into Catalan from the original texts, which was almost contemporary of the other version made in Montserrat by Bonaventura Ubach. This tradition of biblical studies has continued until now, with present experts such as Frederic Raurell, Enric Cortès and Jordi Cervera.

Miquel d'Esplugues also founded and was the director of the review Estudios Franciscanos in 1907. This review is still published, after a short period after the Spanish Civil War, in which it was not published. He also founded in 1925 the first Catalan review on philosophy, Criterion (1925–1936).

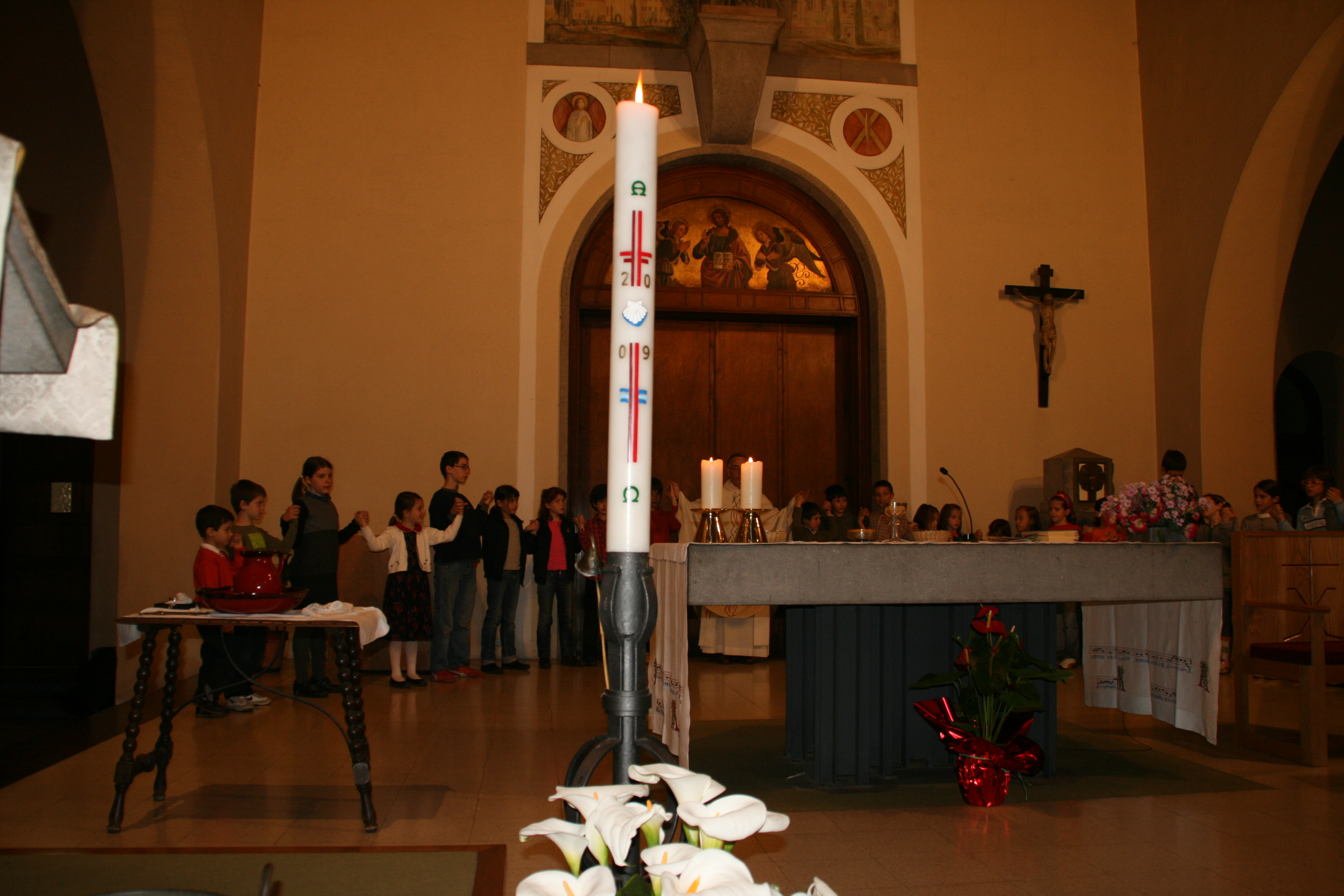
Interior of the Church of the Sarrià Capuchins

In 1936 the convent was burned and saccaged by the anarchist militia, but the neighbours helped to save part of the library. In 1939 the restoration began, under the direction of the architect Pere Benavent. The review Estudios Franciscanos was published again since 1948. The new director was Basili de Rubí. Criterion was also published again in 1959, but now it was a collection of philosophical and religious matters. Basili de Rubí was also the new director, and during a short time, Àlvar Maduell. The collection was going to be at first a review, but the laws of the Francoist minister Manuel Fraga Iribarne did not authorize that, and the review was closed in 1969.

During the 1950s, Basili de Rubí founded the association Franciscalia. It was an association with the aim of fostering spirituality and culture. It had laymen collaborators such as Roc Llorens, Josep Maria Piñol, Jordi Maragall and Tomás Carreras Artau, among others.

In 1966 the convent held a meeting of students, which was known as the Caputxinada, where there was an assembly in which the Sindicat Democràtic d'Estudiants de la Universitat de Barcelona (SDEUB – Democratic Students Union of the University of Barcelona) was founded. The police surrounded the convent during three days, and it caused a state of sympathy, even at an international level.

Under the altar of one chapel, inside a vase, there are the remainders of nine out of the twenty-six Capuchin martyrs of the beginning of the Spanish Civil War. The rest has not been found. These martyrs were beatified on 21 November 2015 in the Cathedral of Barcelona.

Nowadays, the convent of Sarrià hosts the Missions Ethnographic Museum, the Hispano-Capuchin Library and the Provincial Archive of the Capuchins of Catalonia and the Balearic Islands, among others. In 2006 it received the Medal of Honor of Barcelona.

== Distinguished Capuchins ==
=== Missionaries ===
- Josep Busquets i Quintana
- Camil Plàcid Crous i Salichs
- Maties Solà i Farell
- Francesc Xavier Vilà i Mateu

=== Philosophers ===
- Miquel d'Esplugues
- Jordi Llimona i Barret

=== Historians ===
- Basili de Rubí
- Nolasc del Molar
- Martí de Barcelona
- Valentí Serra de Manresa

=== Theologians ===
- Joan Botam
- Esteve Blanch i Busquets

=== Bible researchers ===
- Antoni Maria de Barcelona.
- Marc de Castellví.
- Frederic Raurell.
- Enric Cortès.
- Jordi Cervera.

== Publications ==
- Estudios Franciscanos (Franciscan Studies). It is a review about church and Franciscan studies, which was founded, with an apologetic aim, by Miquel d'Esplugues in 1907. It ceased to be published in 1936 and it was published again since 1948. Nowadays it is a scientific media of research of all the Capuchin provinces of Spain and Portugal. It publishes articles in all the languages that are spoken in the Iberian Peninsula.
- Catalunya Franciscana (Franciscan Catalonia). It was born in 1926, linked with the Secular Franciscan Order. The present director is Josep Manuel Vallejo.

== Bibliography ==
- Barraquer Roviralta, Cayetano. Las casas de los religiosos en Cataluña, durante el primer tercio del siglo XIX. Barcelona. Imp. Altés. 1906 (2 volumes). (in Spanish)
- Barraquer Roviralta, Cayetano. Los religiosos en Cataluña durante la primera mitad del siglo XIX. Barcelona. Imp. Altés. 1915–1917 (4 volumes). (in Spanish)
- Basili de Rubí. Un segle de vida caputxina a Catalunya (1564–1664). Aproximació històrico-bibliogràfica. Barcelona, Caputxins de Sarrià, 1978. (in Catalan)
- Basili de Rubí. Els caputxins a la Barcelona del segle XVIII. Aproximació històrico-bibliogràfica. Barcelona, Caputxins de Sarrià, 1984. (in Catalan)
- Martí i Martí, C. J. Estadística de la Província de Frares Menors Caputxins de Catalunya. 1900–1975. Barcelona. Cúria Provincial. 1975. (in Catalan)
- Serra de Manresa, Valentí. Els framenors caputxins a la Catalunya del segle XIX. Represa conventual, exclaustracions i restauració (1814–1900). Facultat de Teologia de Catalunya, Barcelona 1998. (in Catalan)
- Serra de Manresa, Valentí. La Província de framenors caputxins de Catalunya: de la restauració provincial a l’esclat de la guerra civil (1900–1936). Facultat de Teologia de Catalunya, Barcelona 2000. (in Catalan)
- Serra de Manresa, Valentí. El Terç Orde dels Caputxins. Aportacions del laïcat franciscà a la història contemporània de Catalunya (1883–1957). Facultat de Teologia de Catalunya. Barcelona. 2004. (in Catalan)
- Serra de Manresa, Valentí. Els frares caputxins de Catalunya: de la Segona República a la postguerra, 1931–1942. Facultat de Teologia de Catalunya. Barcelona. 2014. (in Catalan)
