= Edgardo =

Edgardo is an Italian-language form of the name Edgar. It may refer to:

- Edgardo Adinolfi (born 1974), Uruguayan football player
- Edgardo Alfonzo (born 1973), former Major League Baseball infielder
- Cristian Edgardo Álvarez (born 1978), Salvadoran footballer
- Edgardo Andrada (1939–2019), retired professional Argentine footballer
- Edgardo Angara (1934–2018), politician in the Philippines
- Juan Edgardo Angara (born 1972), Filipino politician and lawyer
- Edgardo Arasa, former Argentine footballer
- Edgardo Baldi (1944–2015), former Uruguayan football player and manager
- Edgardo Bauza (born 1958), retired Argentine football defender
- Aquilino Edgardo Boyd de la Guardia (1921–2004), Panamanian politician, diplomatist and lawyer
- Edgardo Brittes (born 1982), Argentine footballer
- Edgardo Caldona (born 1970), Filipino associate justice of the Sandiganbayan
- Edgardo Chatto (born 1960), Filipino politician
- Edgardo Codesal, Uruguayan-Mexican football (soccer) referee
- Edgardo Coghlan (1928–1995), artist born in Los Mochis, Sinaloa in 1928 to an Irish father and Mexican mother
- Jesús Edgardo Colón, mayor of Orocovis, Puerto Rico
- Edgardo Colona (1846–1904), the stage name of Edgar Chalmers, a lesser tragedian in British theatre
- Edgardo Cozarinsky (born 1939), writer and filmmaker
- Edgardo Díaz (born c. 1947), creator of the boy band Menudo in Panama
- Edgardo Díaz (Argentine footballer) (born 1988), Argentine footballer
- Edgardo Díaz (athlete) (born 1968), former pole vaulter from Puerto Rico
- Edgardo Díaz (fencer) (born 1961), Puerto Rican fencer
- Edgardo Donato (1897–1963), Uruguayan tango composer and orchestra leader, born in Buenos Aires, Argentina
- Edgardo Enríquez (1912–1996), Chilean physician, academic and Minister of Education under the Salvador Allende government
- Edgardo Leyva Escandon, Mexican national and career criminal
- Edgardo Fuentes (born 1958), former Chilean professional footballer
- Edgardo Fulgencio (1917–2004), Filipino former basketball player, competed in the 1948 Summer Olympics
- Edgardo Rivera García, Associate Justice of the Supreme Court of Puerto Rico
- Edgardo Garrido (1888–1976), Chilean writer
- Alcides Ghiggia (1926–2015), former Italian Uruguayan football player
- Pedro Edgardo Giachino (1947–1982), Argentine Navy officer, the first serviceman killed in action in the Falklands War
- Edgardo González (1936–2007), Uruguayan football midfielder
- Edgardo Guilbe (born 1966), retired Puerto Rican sprinter who specialized in the 200 metres
- Edgardo Henriquez (born 2002), Venezuelan baseball player
- Luis Edgardo Mercado Jarrín (1919–2012), Peruvian politician, Prime Minister of Peru 1973 to 1975
- Edgardo Rodríguez Juliá (born 1946), Puerto Rican essayist and novelist
- Edgardo Labella (1951–2021), Filipino politician and lawyer, Mayor of Cebu City
- Julián Edgardo Maidana (born 1972), Argentine footballer who plays as a central-defender
- Edgardo Madinabeytia (1932–2002), Argentine football goalkeeper
- Edgardo Carlos Suárez Mallagray, Salvadorian diplomat, Ambassador of El Salvador to Russia
- Edgardo Massa (born 1981), former tennis player from Argentina
- Edgardo di Meola (1950–2005), Argentine footballer
- Edgardo Miranda-Rodriguez, American artist
- Edgardo Mortara (1851–1940), Jewish boy and a Roman Catholic priest who became the center of an international controversy
- Edgardo Obregón (born 1999), football prodigy
- Edgardo Ocampo (1938–1992), Filipino basketball player and head coach
- Edgardo Orzuza (born 1986), Paraguayan international footballer
- Edgardo Pailos (born 1967), former field hockey player from Argentina
- Edgardo Parizzia (1935–2010), Argentine former basketball player
- Edgardo Pomini (1917–1958), Argentine fencer
- Edgardo Prátola (1969–2002), Argentine football (soccer) player
- Edgardo Ramos (born 1960), American lawyer and judge
- Edgardo Rebosio (1914-?), Italian professional football player
- Edgardo M. Reyes, Filipino male novelist
- Enrique Edgardo Rodriguez (born 1952), Argentina-born former international rugby union player
- Edgardo Roque (1938–2026), Filipino Olympic basketball player
- Edgardo Ruiz, Puerto Rican ten-pin bowler
- Edgardo Salvame (1963–2024), Filipino politician
- Edgardo Santos (born 1970), Puerto Rican professional boxer
- Edgardo Simón (born 1974), Argentine professional track and road bicycle racer
- Edgardo Simovic (born 1975), Uruguayan soccer player
- Edgardo Sogno (1915–2000), Italian diplomat, partisan and political figure
- Edgardo Lami Starnuti (1887–1968), Italian lawyer and politician
- Edgardo Gabriel Storni (1936–2012), the Archbishop Emeritus of the Archdiocese of Santa Fe de la Vera Cruz, Argentina
- Edgardo Toetti (1910–1968), Italian athlete who competed mainly in the 100 metres
- Edgardo Vaghi (1915–1986), Italian bobsledder who competed in the late 1930s
- Edgardo Pires Ferreira, (born 1937), Brazilian sociologist, museologist, archeologist, zooarchaeologist and genealogist.
- Edgardo José Maya Villazón (born 1951), Colombian lawyer, and former Inspector General of Colombia
- Edgardo Vega Yunqué (1936–2008), Puerto Rican novelist and short-story writer, also called Ed Vega

== See also ==
- Estadio Edgardo Baltodano Briceño, multi-use stadium in Liberia, Costa Rica
- Gobernador Edgardo Castello Airport (IATA: VDM, ICAO: SAVV), an airport in Río Negro Province, Argentina
- Eadgar (disambiguation)
- Edgar (disambiguation)
- Edgard (disambiguation)
