= Museum of Montserrat =

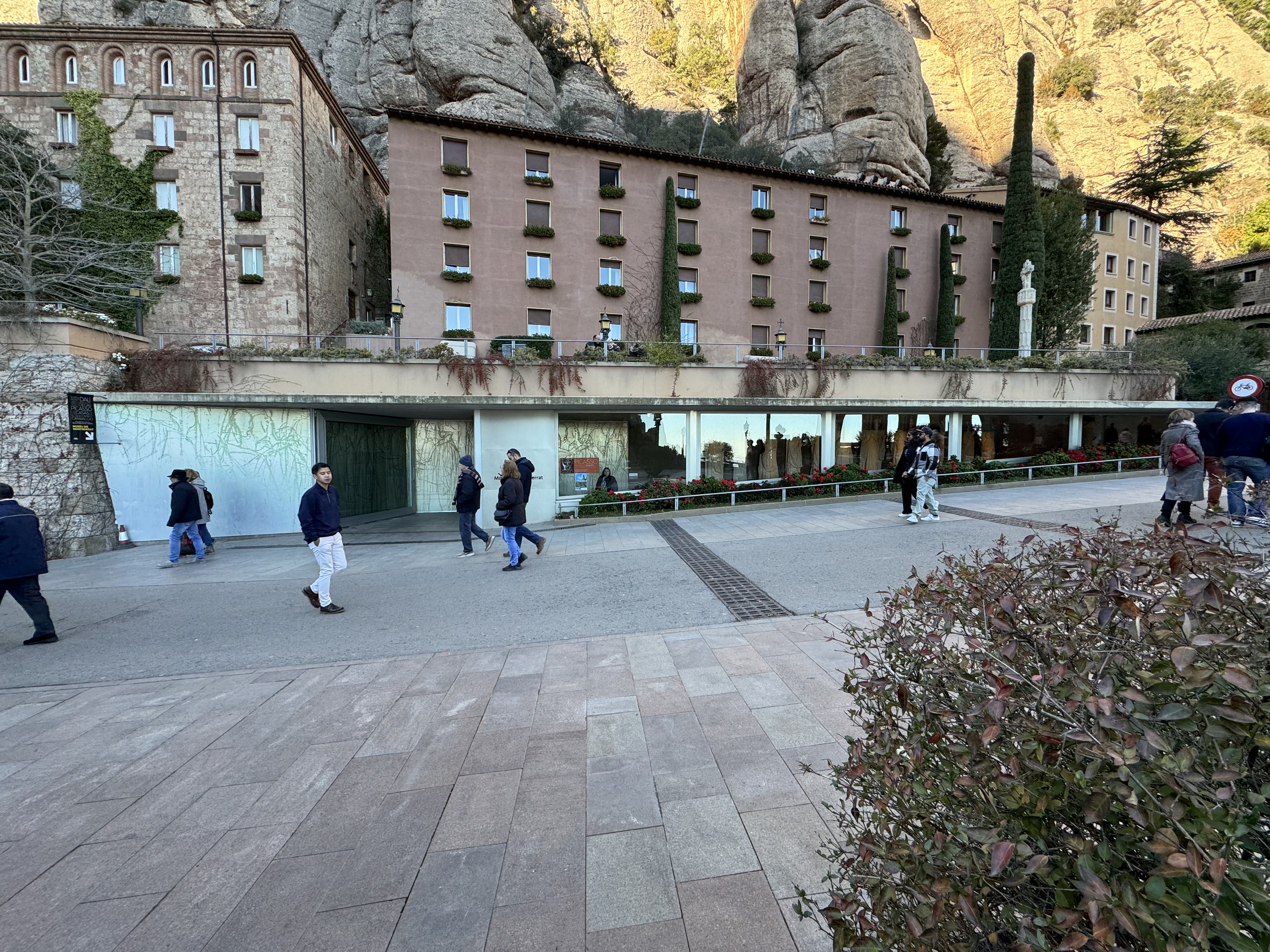

- Location within Spain
- Established: 1911; 115 years ago
- Location: 08199 Montserrat, Barcelona, Spain
- Coordinates: 41°35′36.1″N 1°50′14.93″E
- Type: Art and archaeology museum
- Website: www.museudemontserrat.com/en

The Museum of Montserrat showcases a selection of the most outstanding artistic and archaeological heritage at the thousand-year-old Abbey of Montserrat. The museum contains six very different collections. More than 1300 pieces are exhibited in the museum, embracing a vast chronological period.

== History ==
The original basis of the Museum of Montserrat was the so-called ‘Biblical Museum’, a huge, admirable work by the monk Dom Bonaventura Ubach (Barcelona, 1879–Montserrat, 1960), who spent long periods of his life in Jerusalem and Beirut from 1906.

The oldest exhibit is an Egyptian sarcophagus from the 13th century BC, whilst the most recent is a painting by Sean Scully dating to 2010. The sarcophagus forms part of the Archaeology of the Biblical East Collection, along with other objects from the cultures of Mesopotamia, Egypt, Greece, the Holy Land and Cyprus.

There is also an exhibition devoted to the Iconography of Our Lady of Montserrat, which traces the changing way in which the Virgin has been represented in art over the centuries.

Since 2006 the Museum of Montserrat has a new section: a collection of about 160 Byzantine and Slavic icons that is titled Phos Hilaron (joyful light). These icons presented on the environment of an oriental church where the light has an important role.

The other collections are: Goldsmithery, comprising liturgical objects from the 15th to the 20th century; Painting from the 13th to the 18th century, which includes works by Berruguete, El Greco, Caravaggio, Luca Giordano, Tiepolo, etc.; and 19th and 20th century Painting, which boasts one of the finest collections of Catalan painting, including such outstanding names as Fortuny, Rusiñol, Casas, Nonell, Mir, Gimeno, Anglada Camarasa, Picasso, Dalí, etc. French Impressionist art is also represented in this section, with works by Monet, Sisley, Degas, Pissarro, etc., as well as graphic works by many of the greatest contemporary artists: Chagall, Braque, Le Corbusier, Rouault, Miró, Dalí, Picasso, Clavé, Tàpies, etc.

The Museum of Montserrat is a living entity. It experiences a constant transformation and continuous and renewed exhibitions of its collection. Only a small part of it is exhibited permanently. This is why temporary exhibitions follow each other non-stop in the Pere Daura Room and the Pere Pruna Art Space. These temporary exhibitions make up the best complement to the Museum’s visitors and stand for the real efforts of this institution. On 2015 a Sean Scully art space was opened at Santa Cecilia in Montserrat.

== Outstanding artworks ==
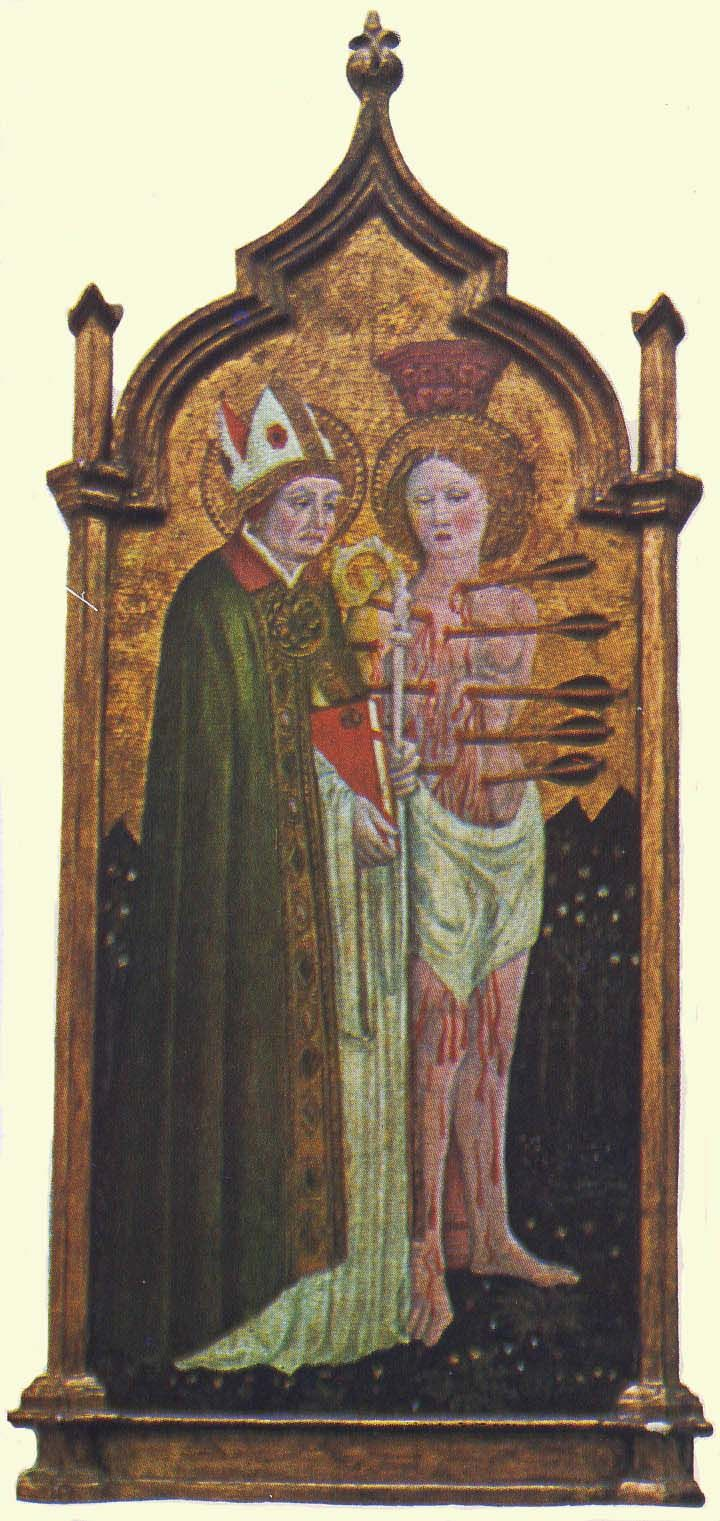
Saint Augustin and Saint Sebastian by Benedetto Bonfigli (s XV).

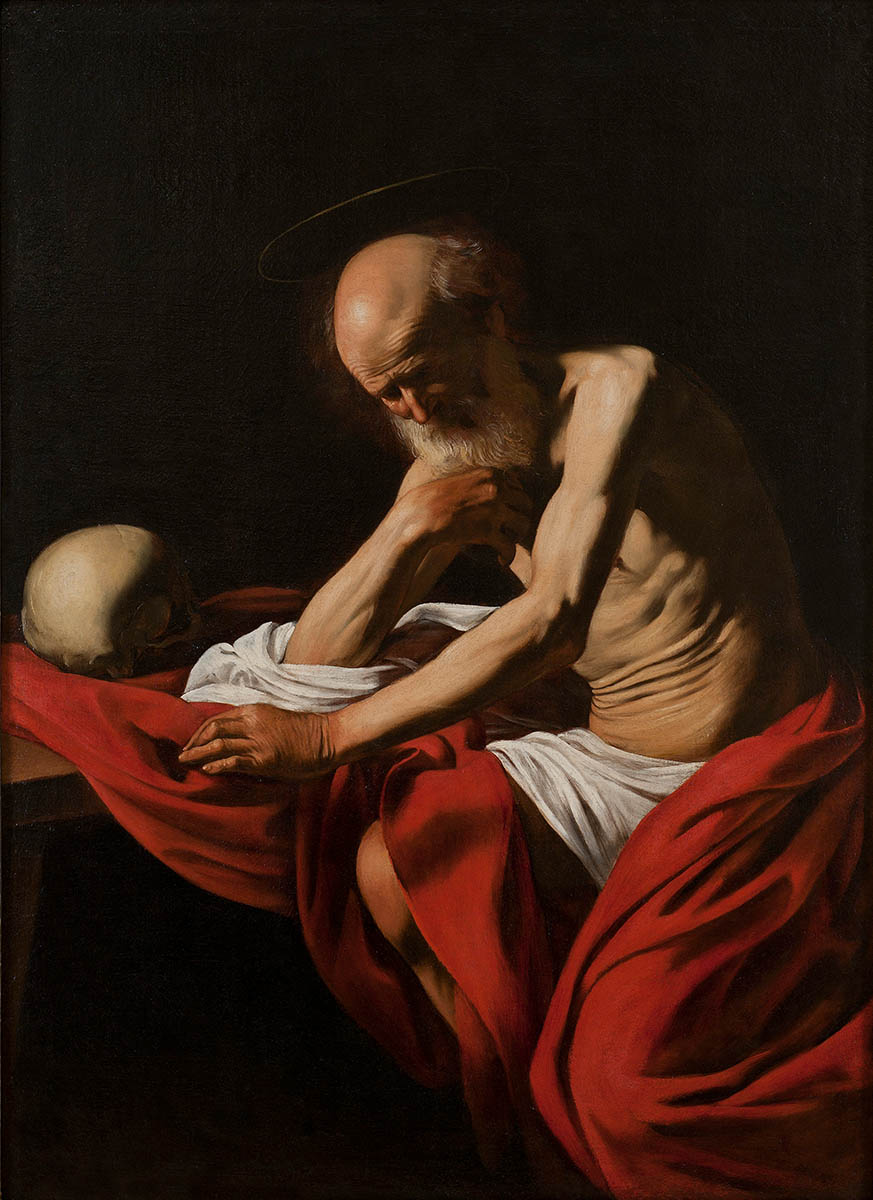
Saint Jerome in Meditation by Caravaggio.

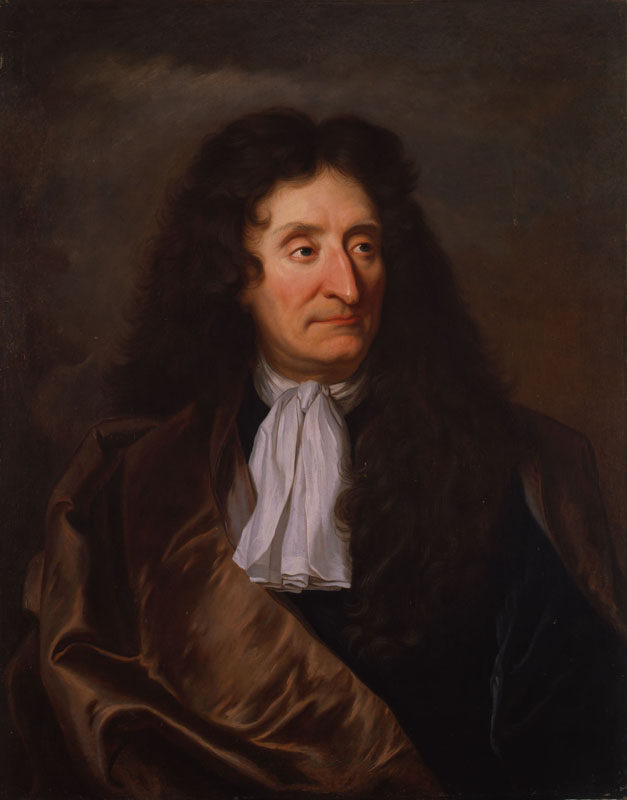
Jean de La Fontaine, by Hyacinthe Rigaud.

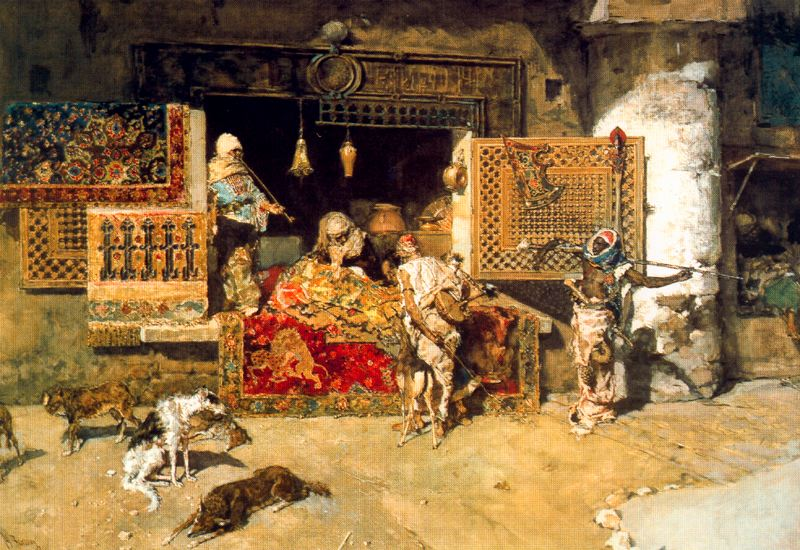
El venedor de tapissos by Marià Fortuny.

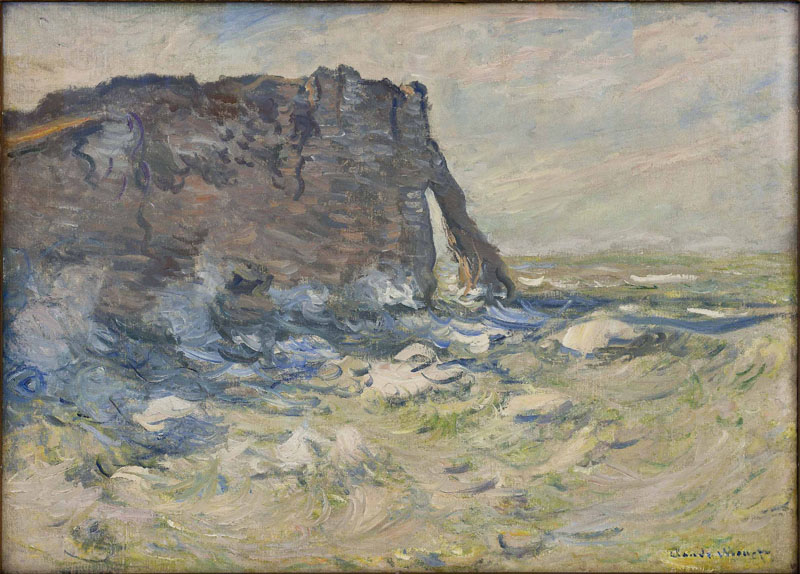
Porte d'Aval by Claude Monet.

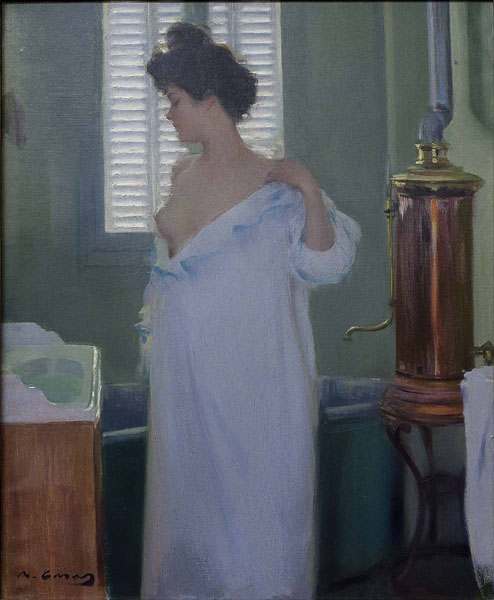
Abans del bany, by Ramon Casas.

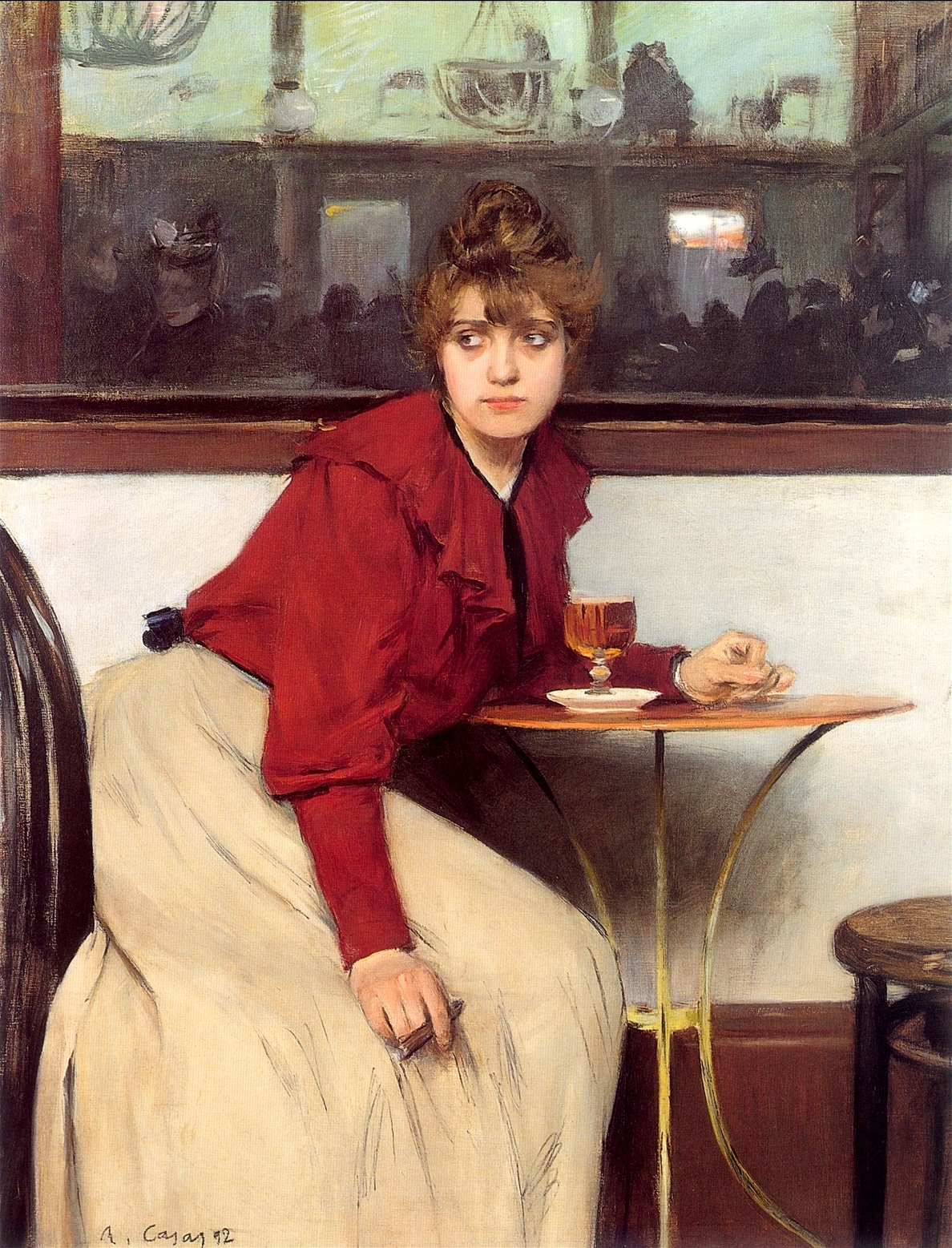
Madeleine, by Ramon Casas.

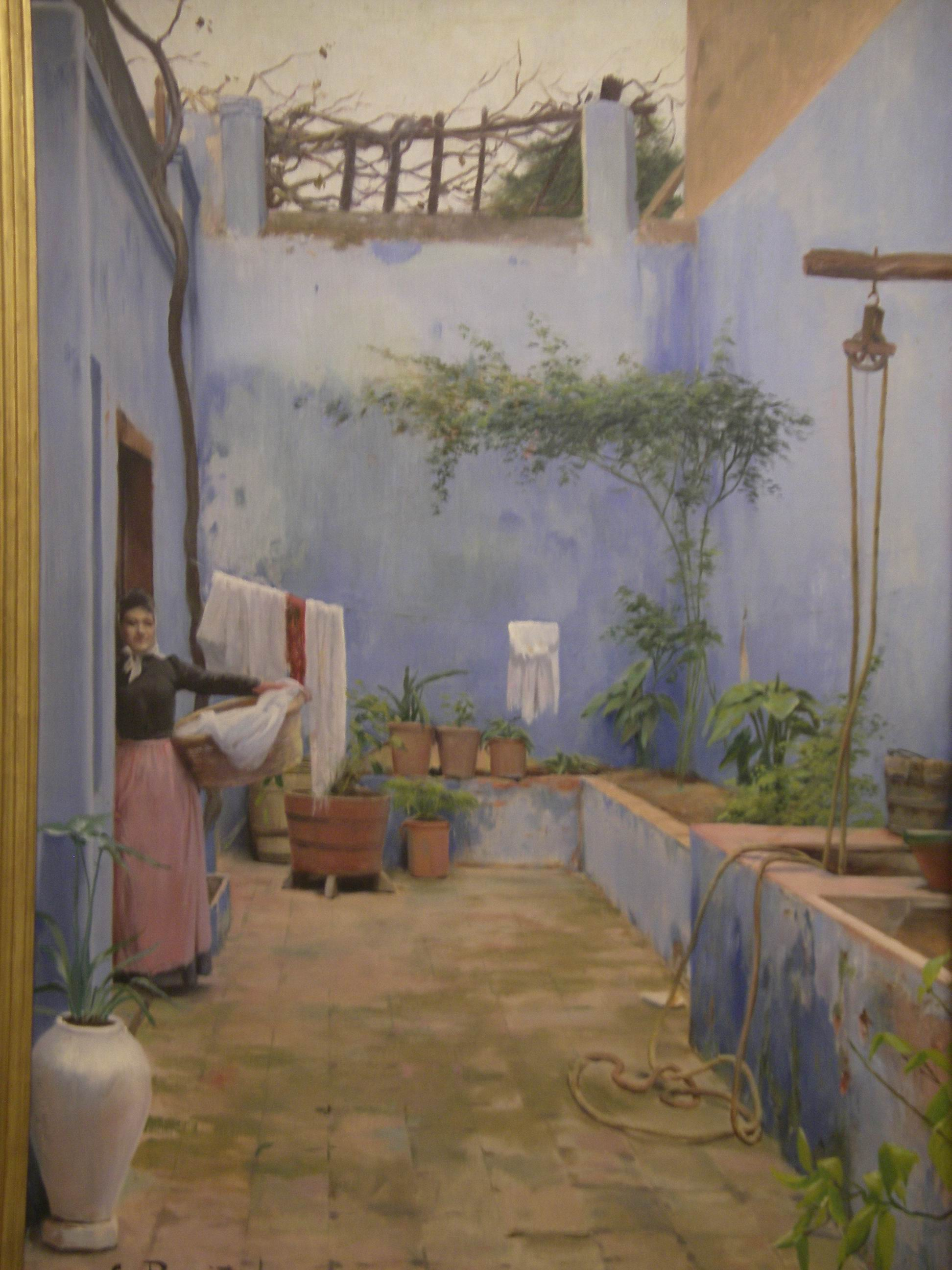
El pati blau, by Santiago Rusiñol.

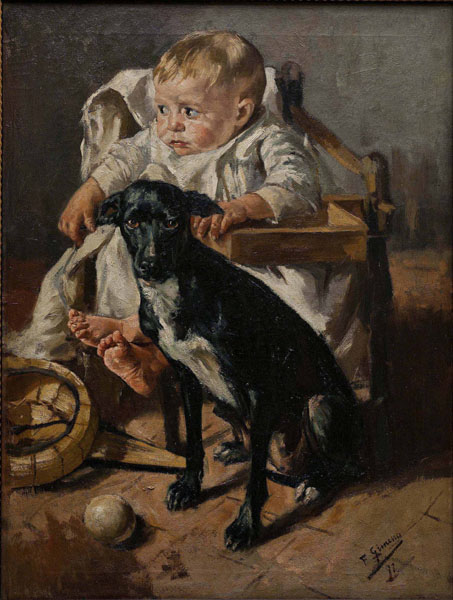
La nena petita i el bon companyó, by Francesc Gimeno

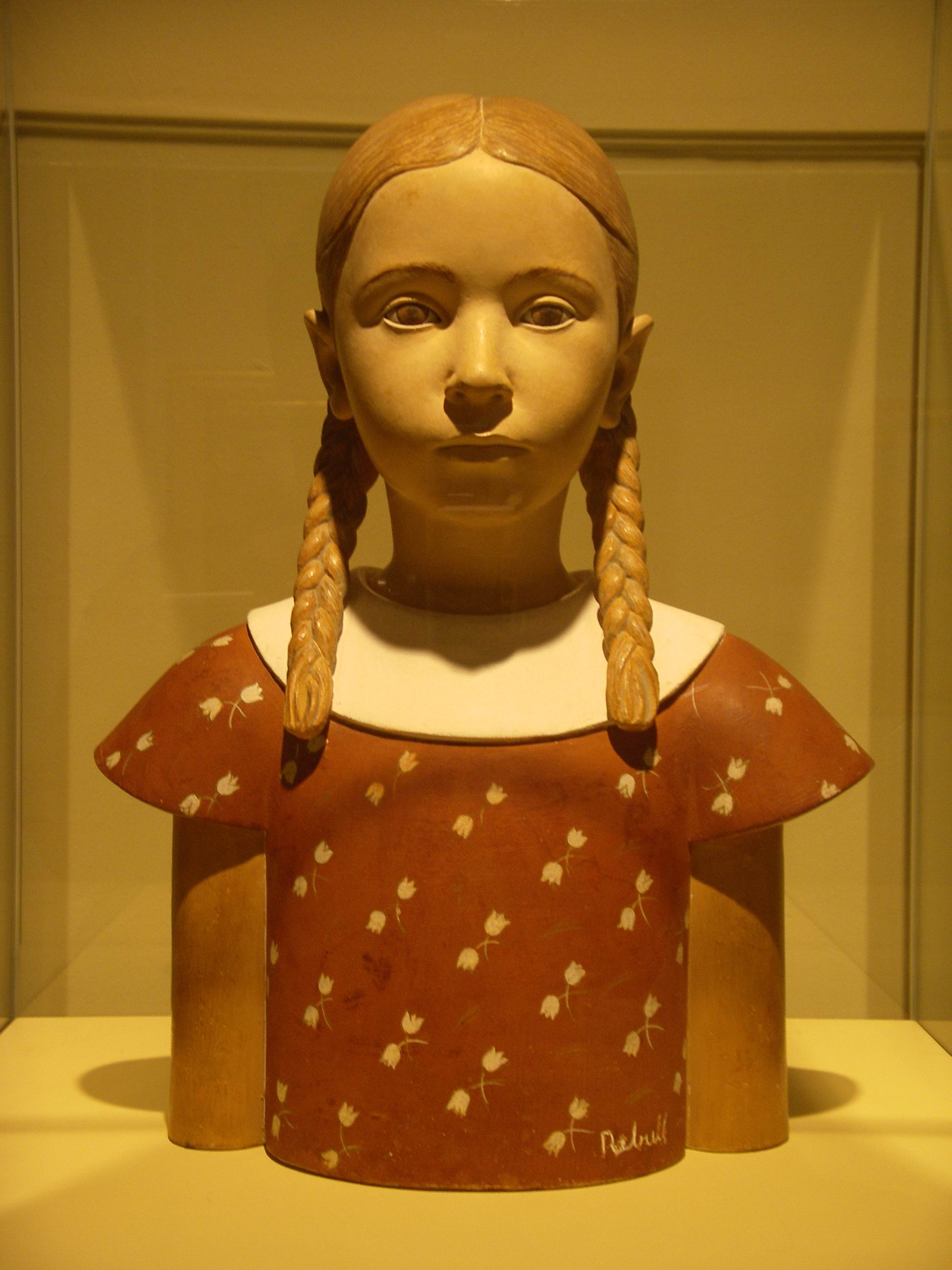
La nena by Joan Rebull.
