= Edgard =

Edgard may refer to the following:

- Edgard, Louisiana
- Edgard Félix Pierre Jacobs, Belgian comic book creator and writer
- Edgard Lévy, French Jewish Resistance fighter
- Edgard Varèse, French composer

== See also ==
- Eadgar (disambiguation)
- Edgar (disambiguation)
- Edgardo
