= Arasa =

Arasa may refer to:

== People ==
- Edgardo Arasa (born 1961), Argentine former footballer
- Francesc Gimeno i Arasa (1858-1927), Spanish painter and graphic artist
- Linet Arasa (born 1996), Kenyan rugby sevens player

== Others ==
- Arasa ga VTuber ni Natta Hanashi, Japanese light novel series
- Arasa Kattalai, 1969 film written by M. G. Chakrapani
- Banga Arasa, dynastic title of a medieval ruling family
- Arasa language, Peruvian language
