= Eloi de Bianya =

Catalan Capuchin friar (1875–1936)

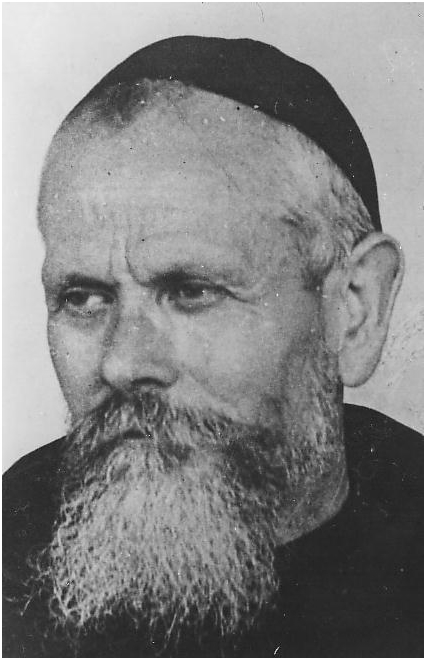
Eloi de Bianya

Joan Ayats Plantalech (4 June 1875 – 28 July 1936) was a Catalan capuchin friar whose religious name was friar Eloi de Bianya. He died as a martyr after declaring that he was a friar and he is considered as a blessed by the Catholic Church.

He was born in Sant Salvador de Bianya. He was a construction worker in his village, and he became friar on 22 June 1900. He was the doorman of the convent of the Sarrià Capuchins, and once all the friars had left, he tried to escape with his nephew and another friar. He was murdered after confessing that he was a friar in the North Station of Barcelona, together with Brother Cebrià de Terrassa, almoner, and the students Brother Miquel de Bianya and Brother Jordi de Santa Pau.

He is considered a martyr by the Catholic Church and in a ceremony that was presided by the cardinal Angelo Amato in the Cathedral of Barcelona he was declared blessed on 21 November 2015 together with other Capuchin friars such as Martí Tarrés i Puigpelat. He was considered a saint already when he was alive.

The remainders of him and nine other martyr colleagues are set in a vase in the church of the convent of the Sarrià Capuchins.
