= Edgars =

Edgars may refer to:

- Edgars, New Jersey, United States
- Edgars, Ontario, Canada
- The Edgar Awards for mystery fiction
- Edgars (department store), a former department store chain in South Africa owned by Edcon Limited
- Edgar Department Stores, a defunct department store chain in New England
- Edgars (name), people with the name

== See also ==
- Edgar (disambiguation)
