= Josep Rius-Camps =

Spanish priest and biblical scholar (1933–2025)

- Born: 15 June 1933; Esparreguera, Catalonia, Spain
- Died: 19 November 2025 (aged 92)
- Occupation: Biblist scholar
- Employer: Faculty of Theology of Catalonia
- Awards: Ciutat de Barcelona de Traducció
- Website: rius-camps.cat/

Josep Rius-Camps (15 June 1933 – 19 November 2025) was a Spanish priest, biblical scholar and patristic scholar, who was Professor Emeritus of the Faculty of Theology of Catalonia.

== Life and career ==
Doctor in Oriental ecclesiastical sciences from the Pontifical Oriental Institute in Rome (1968), where he also taught at the University of Münster and the Augustinianum in Rome. He was the author of numerous studies – in Catalan, Spanish and English – on patristics (Origen, the Pseudoclementines and Ignatius of Antioch) and on the New Testament (Mark and Luke-Acts). He was director of the Catalan Journal of Theology from its foundation in 1976 until 2008. He was editor, with Jenny Read-Heimerdinger, of the bilingual edition (Greek-English), for the first time in a single work, of the two volumes of Luke's writings: Demonstration to Theophilus. The Gospel and the Acts of the Apostles according to Codex Bezae (T&T Clark, 2013), winner of the City of Barcelona Prize for translation into Catalan for its previous edition in this language, in 2009. In 2012, it was translated into English. In his novel Diari de Teòfil (Fragmenta Editorial, 2011) he gave narrative form to research on the work of Luke. Conversations with Josep Rius-Camps, by Ignasi Moreta, have recently been published. He lived in the hermitage of Sant Pere de Reixac.

Rius-Camps died on 19 November 2025, at the age of 92.

== Works ==
- RIUS CAMPS, Josep and Jenny READ-HEIMERDINGER, The Message of Acts in Codex Bezae. London: T & T Clark International, 2004, ISBN 9780567114143
- RIUS CAMPS, Josep and Jenny READ-HEIMERDINGER, The Message of Acts in Codex Bezae (vol 2). London: T & T Clark International, 2006, ISBN 9780567040121
- RIUS CAMPS, Josep and Jenny READ-HEIMERDINGER, The Message of Acts in Codex Bezae (vol 3). London: T & T Clark International, 2007, ISBN 9780567032485
- RIUS CAMPS, Josep and Jenny READ-HEIMERDINGER, The Message of Acts in Codex Bezae (vol 4). London: T & T Clark International, 2009, ISBN 9780567048998
- RIUS CAMPS, Josep, Diari de Teòfil (Barcelona: Fragmenta Editorial, 2011) ISBN 978-84-92416-49-3
- RIUS-CAMPS, Josep, Camino de Pablo a la misión de los paganos: Hch 13-28, El (Madrid: Ediciones Cristiandad), ISBN 978-84-7057-346-0
- RIUS CAMPS, Josep and Jenny READ-HEIMERDINGER (editors) Demostración a Teófilo. Evangelio y Hechos de los Apóstoles según el Códice Beza (Barcelona: Fragmenta Editorial, 2012. ISBN 978-84-92416-52-3 (In Catalan ISBN 978-84-92416-17-2; in English ISBN 9780567438881)
