= Gimeno =

Gimeno is a surname. Notable people with the surname include:

- Álvar Gimeno (born 1997), Spanish professional rugby union footballer
- Amalio Gimeno, 1st Count of Gimeno (1852–1936), Spanish nobleman, physician, scientist and politician
- Andrés Gimeno (born 1937), Spanish tennis player
- Beatriz Gimeno (born 1962), Spanish politician and LGBT rights activist
- Concepción Gimeno de Flaquer (1850–1919), Spanish writer, editor, feminist, traveler
- Daniel Gimeno Traver (born 1985), Spanish tennis player
- Dimas Gimeno, Spanish businessperson and lawyer
- Enrique Gimeno (1929–2007), Spanish-Mexican conductor, music professor, composer, pianist, manager of festivals
- Gustavo Gimeno (born 1976), Spanish conductor
- Joaquín Gimeno Lahoz (1948–2026), Spanish-born Argentine Roman Catholic bishop
- Jorge Gimeno (born 1990), Spanish triple jumper
- Luis Gimeno (1927–2017), Uruguayan-born Mexican actor
- Mario Gimeno (born 1969), Spanish footballer
