= Enric Cortès =

Enric Cortès i Minguella (Guimerà, 1939) is a Catalan Capuchin and biblical scholar.

== Education and career ==
He studied theology in the University of Fribourg, and he became a doctor in Rome in 1972, with the thesis Los discursos de adiós de Gn 49 a Jn 13-17. Pistas para la historia de un género literario en la antigua literatura judía (The farewell discourses from Gn 49 to Jn 13-17. Traces for the history of a literary genre in the ancient Jewish literature) (1976). He has been secretary of the Biblical Association of Catalonia since its foundation (1973) and the head of the Bible department and teacher of the Faculty of Theology of Catalonia. He is Capuchin, and nowadays he belongs to the Capuchin Brotherhood of Sarrià.

He has studied the Hebrew manuscripts of Girona. He has published important exegetical studies about the Bible, both in Catalan and in Spanish. He has also translated many works of ancient Hebrew literature into Spanish. In the translation into Catalan of the Bible that was made by the Catalan Biblical Foundation, he translated the Book of Obadiah and the Book of Malachi. He was also a member of a group of translators of the interdenominational Bible.

After his studies in Fribourg-Rome-Jerusalem, he became specialized in ancient Jewish literature and medieval Judaism. He is emeritus professor in the Faculty of Theology of Catalonia, where he has taught Bible theology. There he is, the director of the collection “Intertestament Literature” and he is a member and founder of the Association of Scholars of Catalan Judaism. In the ISCREB (Superior Institute of Religious Sciences of Barcelona), he teaches Hebrew language, post-Bible Judaism and introduction to the New Testament. He has published several articles in the Catalan Review of Theology.
