= Estudios Franciscanos =

Review of ecclesiastic and Franciscan studies

Estudis Franciscans or Estudios Franciscanos (Franciscan Studies), is a review about church and Franciscan studies, which was founded, with an apologetic aim, by Miquel d'Esplugues in 1907. It ceased publication in 1936 and it was re-published again since 1948. Today, it is used as a scientific media of research of all the Capuchin provinces of Spain and Portugal. It publishes articles in all the languages that are spoken in the Iberian Peninsula.

This review, which was born in Catalonia, is one of the main review with research and scientific articles from the provinces that form the Capuchin Iberic Conference (C.I.C.). The CIC is the owner of the review, but the headquarters are located in Catalonia.

== History, name and regularity ==
The review was founded in 1907 with the name of Revista de Estudios Franciscanos (1907–11). Since then it has had different names: Estudios Franciscanos (1912–22), Estudis Franciscans (1923–36) and then again Estudios Franciscanos (since 1947). Some special volumes have been published separately: Homenaje al cardenal Vives y Tutó (Homage to Cardinal Vives y Tutó) (1913), Miscel·lània tomista (Thomist Miscellany) (1924), Franciscàlia (1928), and Miscel·lània lul·liana (Lullist Miscellany) (1935). The collection has more than seventy-four volumes.

The review had a monthly regularity at the beginning of 1907. In 1927 its regularity became quarterly, and in 1947, four-monthly. Today, it is published twice a year: (January–August; September–December) and it consists yearly of 450 pages (150 each issue). In some special cases, yearly issue will be published.

Among the most important collaborators, the following ones can be pointed out: Miquel d'Esplugues (founder and first director), Antoni M. de Barcelona, Andreu de Palma de Mallorca, Francesc de Barbens, Modest de Mieras, Ambrós de Saldes, Basili de Rubí, Nolasc del Molar, Martí de Barcelona, Samuel d'Algaida, Marc de Castellví, Pere M. Bordoy i Torrents.

== Aims ==
The review's main features come from some specific aims, and now they are the following:

- Development of research, and high-quality studies among the Capuchins through this review;
- Spreading of Franciscan thought, history and spirituality.

== Guidelines, structure and language ==
The guidelines of the scientific works that will be published are:

- Studies written by Capuchins, especially in the field of church sciences;
- Studies that are directly linked to the Franciscan and Capuchin thought and life, even though they were written by people that are neither Franciscans nor Capuchins.

The review has the following sections:

- research studies;
- notes and comments;
- recensions;
- received books.

The review is published in the languages of the Capuchin Iberic Conference (C.I.C.). Articles that are written in important languages can be accepted, but in this case, a summary in Spanish must be enclosed.
