= Valentí Serra de Manresa =

Spanish Capuchin and priest

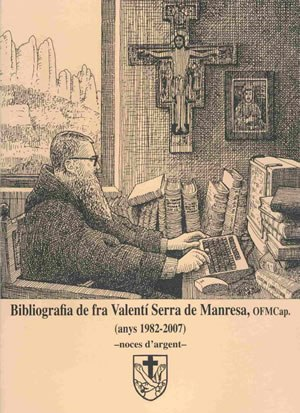
Cover of Brother Valentí Serra de Manresa's Bibliography

Valentí Serra i Fornell (Manresa, Bages, 1959), is a Spanish Capuchin and priest, whose religious name is Valentí Serra de Manresa.

== Biography ==
He was born in a Catalan traditional family of farmers and ranchers. He became Capuchin in 1980 and he took the vows of saint Francis' rule on 30 October 1982. Once he finished his years of religious instruction, he became priest on 31 May 1987 in the Capuchin convent of Arenys de Mar. Then he moved to the Sarrià Capuchins, where he lives nowadays. He became Doctor in History in the University of Barcelona in 1995.

He is scientific partner of the Theology Faculty of Catalonia (2007). He is part also of the Doctors board of the University of Barcelona (1997). Since 1987 he is provincial archivist of the Capuchins and director of the Hispanic-Capuchin Library. He is correspondent in Barcelona of the Revue d'Histoire Ecclésiastique (Review of Church History) (Université catholique de Louvain) and member of the editorial staff of the review Analecta Sacra Tarraconensia (Balmesiana). He was also editor from 1991 to 2013 of the Índice Histórico Español (Spanish Historical Index), which is a review about bibliographical critics, founded in 1953 by Jaume Vicens Vives and published by the "Centro de Estudios Históricos Internacionales" (Center of Historical International Studies). He collaborates regularly with the weekly newspaper Catalunya Cristiana (Christian Catalonia). Since 2015 he takes part in the composition of the Calendar of Brother Ramon of the Pyrenees, which is quite popular in Catalonia. He writes also the section L'hortet del frare (the friar's little garden) in the section Cuina de convent (Convent cuisine) in the newspaper El Jardí de Sant Gervasi i Sarrià. Since 2017 he broadcasts the radio program Remeis de l'ermità (hermit's remedies) in the radio station Fes ta festa.

== Research task ==
He has made researches with a critical method about the institutional history of the Catalonia Capuchins from the beginning of the Bourbon dynasty (1700) until the outburst of the Spanish Civil War (1936); also about the Capuchin Clarisses since their foundation in Catalonia (1599) until the end of the Spanish Civil War (1939). He has also studied the evolution of the Franciscan laity that is linked with the Capuchins in the contemporary period (1883-1957) and the missionary history of the Catalan Capuchins overseas (1680-1989). These researches are included in nine volumes of the Col·lectània Sant Pacià (Saint Pacian collection) that publishes the Theology Faculty of Catalonia. He is currently making researches about the contribution of Catalan Capuchins to the Catalan popular and religious tradition: the representations of the birth of Jesus Christ and the popular devotions; the convents cuisine and the medicinal plants; the friars' horticulture and gardening

The rest of his works, contributions to collective works, prologues, scientific and popular articles and even, participation in congresses between 1982 and 2007 have been gathered in the book Bibliografia de fra Valentí Serra de Manresa, OFMCap. (anys 1982-2007). Noces d'argent (in Catalan) (Bibliography of Valentí Serra de Manresa, OFMCap. (1982-2007). Silver wedding), by Dr. Joan Ferrer i Costa and Núria Ferret i Canale O.Virg. (Barcelona 2007).

== Main works ==
- Els caputxins de Catalunya, de l'adveniment borbònic a la invasió napoleònica: vida quotidiana i institucional, actituds, mentalitat, cultura (1700-1814), Barcelona, 1996. (in Catalan)
- Els framenors caputxins a la Catalunya del segle XIX. Represa conventual, exclaustracions i restauració (1814-1900), Barcelona, 1998. (in Catalan)
- La Província de framenors caputxins de Catalunya: de la restauració provincial a l'esclat de la guerra civil (1900-1936), Barcelona, 2000. (in Catalan)
- Les clarisses-caputxines a Catalunya i Mallorca: de la fundació a la guerra civil (1599-1939), Barcelona, 2002. (in Catalan)
- El Terç Orde dels Caputxins. Aportacions del laïcat franciscà a la història contemporània de Catalunya (1883-1957), Barcelona, 2004. (in Catalan)
- Tres segles de vida missionera: la projecció pastoral "ad gentes" dels framenors caputxins de Catalunya (1680-1989), Barcelona, 2006. (in Catalan)
- El cardenal Vives i l'Església del seu temps, Museu-Arxiu Vives i Tutó, Sant Andreu de Llavaneres, 2007. (in Catalan)
- Aportació dels framenors caputxins a la cultura catalana: des de la fundació a la guerra civil (1578-1936), Barcelona, Facultat de Teologia de Catalunya, 2008 (Col·lectània Sant Pacià, 92). (in Catalan)
- Els caputxins i el pessebre, Barcelona, El Bou i la Mula, 2009. (in Catalan)
- Cuina caputxina. Les pitances dels frares, Barcelona, Ed. Mediterrània, 2010. 2 editions. (in Catalan)
- Pompeia. Orígens històrics d'un projecte agosarat, Barcelona, Ed. Mediterrània, 2010. (in Catalan)
- El caputxí Joaquim M. de Llavaneres (1852-1923). Semblança biogràfica i projecció internacional, Sant Andreu de Llavaneres, Museu-Arxiu Vives i Tutó, 2011. (in Catalan)
- Els caputxins i les herbes remeieres, Barcelona, Ed. Mediterrània 2011. 5 editions. (in Catalan)
- La predicació dels framenors caputxins: des de l'arribada a Catalunya al concili Vaticà II (1578-1965), Barcelona, Facultat de Teologia de Catalunya, 2012(Col·lectània Sant Pacià, 100). (in Catalan)
- Pócimas de capuchino. Hierbas y recetas conventuales, Barcelona, Editorial Mediterrània, 2013. (in Spanish)
- Hortalisses i flors remeieres. Les herbes santes dels caputxins, Barcelona, Editorial Mediterrània, 2014. 2 editions. (in Catalan)
- Els frares caputxins de Catalunya: de la Segona República a la postguerra (1931-1942), Barcelona, Facultat de Teologia de Catalunya, 2014. (in Catalan)
- La parròquia de Sant Joan de la Creu. L’acció pastoral dels caputxins al barri del Peu del Funicular de Vallvidrera (Barcelona, 1950-2015). Photos by Joan Devesa. Prologue by Conrad J. Martí. Barcelona, Editorial Mediterrània, 2015. (in Catalan)
- Cocinar en tiempos de crisis. Recetas frailunas y guisados populares. (Colección El Ermitaño, 1), Barcelona, Edicions Morera, 2015. (in Spanish)
- Cuinar en temps de crisi. Receptes de frare i guisats populars. (Col·lecció l’Ermità, 1), Barcelona, Edicions Morera, 2015. (in Catalan)
- La huerta de San Francisco. Horticultura y floricultura capuchina, Barcelona, Editorial Mediterrània. 2016. (in Spanish)
- Tornar als remeis de sempre. Pocions, ungüents i herbes medicinals. (Col·lecció l’Ermità, 4), Barcelona. Edicions Morera, 2017. 4 editions. (in Catalan)
- El huerto medicinal. Sabiduría capuchina de la A a la Z. Barcelona: Editorial Mediterrània. 2018 (in Spanish)
- Catazònia. Els caputxins catalans a l'Amazònia. Barcelona: Museu de Cultures. 2018. (in Catalan)
- El llibre de la mel. Apicultura popular i plantes mel·liferes (Col·lecció L'Ermità 7). Edicions Morera, Barcelona 2019. (in Catalan)
- Cuina pairal i conventual. (Col. Rebost i Cuina, 20). Farell editors. 2019. (in Catalan)
- El nostre pessebre. Tradició, història i simbolisme. Barcelona. Edicions Mediterrània. 2019. (in Catalan)
- Liturgia cartujana (Fr. Josep Oriol de Barcelona i Fr. Valentí Serra de Manresa, coauthors) (Cuadernos Phase, 256). Barcelona. Centre de Pastoral Litúrgica. 2020. (in Spanish)
- Entrem dins del pessebre. Un petit univers a les teves mans (Col·lecció L’Ermità, 11). Edicions Morera. Barcelona. 2022.(in Catalan)
- Viatge a Terra Santa (1930) pel R. P. Marc de Castellví, caputxí. Jordi Vidal, editor. Introducció de Fra Valentí Serra de Manresa (Documents, 123). Bellaterra. Universitat Autònoma de Barcelona. 2022.(in Catalan)
- La volta al món del caputxí Joaquim Maria de Llavaneres (1852-1923). Sant Andreu de Llavaneres. Museu-Arxiu Vives i Tutó. 2023.c.
- Passió per la Setmana Santa. Festes i tradicions (Col·lecció L’Ermità, 13). Edicions Morera. Barcelona. 2023.(in Catalan)
- Quatre segles de vida caputxina, 1578-1968. Barcelona: Eds. Morera 2024.(in Catalan)
- Missa et mensa. Saboroses pitances i altres secrets de la cuina de convent. Barcelona: Albada Edicions. 2025.(in Catalan)
- Quatre segles de vida caputxina, 1578-1968 (Just a temps, 1) Barcelona. Edicions Morera. 2025.(in Catalan)
- Begudes pairals i conventuals. Secrets i tradicions (A la caputxina, 19). Barcelona. Ed. Mediterrània. 2025.(in Catalan)
- Cuina vegetariana de sempre. Menjar en excés desmenja (L'Ermità, 19). Barcelona. Eds. Morera 2025.(in Catalan)

Preparing

- La Botica del Ermitaño. Diccionario de plantas medicinales. Edicions Morera. Barcelona. (in Spanish)
