= Frederic Raurell =

Catalan Capuchin (1930–2023)

Frederic Raurell i Ges (1930 – 21 December 2023) was a Catalan Capuchin.

== Biography ==
Frederic Raurell I Ges was born in Barcelona in 1930. A doctor in theology and graduated in biblical and Semitic studies. He taught in the schools of the Sarrià Capuchins and he was exegesis and hermeneutics teacher in the Pontifical University Antonianum in Rome and in the Faculty of Theology of Catalonia. He was founder of the Biblical Association of Catalonia, of the International Organization for the Study of the Old Testament and of the International Organization for Septuagint and Cognate Studies. He collaborated in the Bible of the Catalan Biblical Foundation and in the Comments to the Office of Readings. He is codirector of the review "Estudios Eclesiásticos", where he published several studies. He was a founder member of the first Editorial Board of Catalan Journal of Theology.

Raurell also wrote about Franciscan matters. Latterly he also conducted research about his own family, Sarrià, and the period of the Spanish Civil War.

Raurell died on 21 December 2023, at the age of 93.

== Works ==
Frederic Raurell published several articles and books They include:

- Ètica de Job i llibertat de Déu. Revista Catalana de Teologia, 4. 1979. 5–24.
- Del text a l’existència (1980). (in Catalan)
- Mots sobre l’home, recopilación de artículos sobre antropología bíblica (1984). (in Catalan)
- Lineamenti di antropologia biblica. Casale Monferrato. 1986. (in Italian)
- Der Mythos vom männlichen Gott (‘The myth of the masculin God’), inside the feminist theology trend (1989). (in German)
- Os, 4,7. De la "Doxa" a la "Atimia". Revista Catalana de Teologia, 14. 1989. 41–51.
- El Càntic dels Càntis en els segles XII i XIII: la lectura de Clara d'Assís. Barcelona. 1990. (in Catalan)
- I Déu digué.... La paraula feta història. Barcelona. 1995. (in Catalan)
