= Catalan Journal of Theology =

Revista Catalana de Teologia
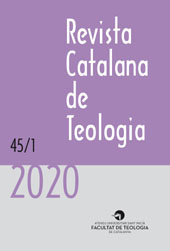
- Discipline: Theology
- Language: Catalan, Spanish, Multiples languages

Publication details
- History: 1976
- Publisher: Ateneu Universitari Sant Pacià (Spain)
- Frequency: Semester

Standard abbreviations
- ISO 4: Rev. Catalana Teol.

Indexing
- ISSN: 0210-5551 (print); 2385-4715 (web)

Links
- Journal homepage

The Catalan Journal of Theology (Catalan language: Revista Catalana de Teologia, with the acronym RCatT, according to the IATG^{2}) is an academic publication with peer review, published by the Editions of the University Athenaeum of Sant Pacià, under the auspices of the Faculty of Theology of Catalonia. Its aim is the production, channeling and dissemination of small studies and articles related to the main fields of Christian theology: exegesis, patristics, theology, liturgy, history and canon law.

It was founded in 1976 by the Sant Pacià Section of the current Faculty of Theology of Catalonia, with Josep Rius-Camps as its first director until 2008. Its essential objective was to implement post-conciliar theology in the sociocultural context of the second half of the 20th century, in the light of the orientations of the Second Vatican Council. It is currently indexed in Old Testament Abstracts Online, in Dialnet, and in RACO. Its ICDS of 4.5 is included in MIAR (Information Matrix for the Analysis of Journals) of the University of Barcelona.

== History ==
As a result of the recent creation of the Faculty of Theology of Catalonia in 1968, the faculty decided to provide itself with a tool for scientific expression and research fundamentally in Catalan. The project of the journal was presented to the Council of the Sant Pacià Section on May 28, 1973; and subsequently it was presented to the Faculty Council, where the two sections (Sant Francesc de Borja and Sant Pacià) were represented, and a session was held on June 15, 1973. According to Massot i Muntaner: "After the forced parenthesis of the first years -in which it was not possible to publish anything in Catalan-, books and magazines of popularization or research were appearing, in many cases of an indisputable quality, some of international interest, such as the "Revista Catalana de Teología" (1976)". This materialized in 1976 with the appearance of Catalan Journal of Theology, with Josep Rius-Camps as its first director. The specific orientation was to generate a space for theological reflection in which scholars could be attentive to the diversity, depth and convergence of the cultural problems of the last third of the twentieth century in Catalonia.

The first editorial board was formed by professors Gaspar Mora, Ramon Pozo, Frederic Raurell and Josep Maria Via Taltavull. Subsequently, Josep Perarnau Espelt, Miquel dels Sants Gros i Pujol, Oriol Tuñí Vancells, Joan Bellavista Ramon, Salvador Pié-Ninot, Xavier Alegre and Josep Castanyé were also members.
