= Edgars, New Jersey =

Populated place in Middlesex County, New Jersey, US

- Unincorporated community
- Location of Edgars in Middlesex County Inset: Location of county within the state of New Jersey Edgars (New Jersey) Edgars (the United States)
- Coordinates: 40°34′03″N 74°16′33″W
- Country: United States
- State: New Jersey
- County: Middlesex
- Township: Woodbridge
- Elevation: 46 ft (14 m)
- GNIS feature ID: 876092

Edgars or Edgar is an unincorporated community located within Woodbridge Township in Middlesex County, in the U.S. state of New Jersey. It approximately includes the area around Woodbridge High School over to Rahway Avenue, south of the Port Reading Railroad. The upper section of Ridgedale Avenue is known as Edgar's Hill. There was a Pennsylvania Railroad stop called Edgars approximately where Prospect Avenue would cross the railway, steps for this are still visible on the western side as of 2016.

== See also ==
- List of neighborhoods in Woodbridge Township, New Jersey
- List of neighborhoods in Edison, New Jersey
