= Edgar Township =

Edgar Township may refer to one of the following townships in the United States:

- Edgar Township, Edgar County, Illinois
- Edgar Township, Clay County, Nebraska
