= HMS Edgar =

There are eight ships of the British Royal Navy that have been named HMS Edgar.

- HMS Edgar (1668), a 70-gun third rate launched in 1668, rebuilt in 1700, and destroyed in an accidental fire 1711.
- HMS Edgar (1758), a 60-gun fourth rate launched in 1758 and sunk as a breakwater in 1774.
- HMS Edgar (1779), a 74-gun third rate launched in 1779, converted to a prison hulk in 1813, renamed Retribution in 1814, and broken up 1835.
- HMS Edgar (1858), a screw-propelled 91-gun second rate launched in 1858, on loan to the Customs Service as a hulk in 1870, and sold 1904.
- The fifth Edgar, launched 1859, was renamed Hood in 1860.
- HMS Edgar (1890), an Edgar-class cruiser launched in 1890 and sold 1921.
- HMS Edgar (51), an aircraft carrier launched in March 1944, renamed Perseus in June, and broken up 1958.
- The eighth Edgar was to have been a 9,000-ton cruiser; projected in 1945, the ship was cancelled in March 1946.
