= King Edgar =

King Edgar may refer to:

- Edgar, King of England (942–975)
- Edgar, King of Scotland (1074–1107)
- Edgar Ætheling (c.1051–c.1126), proclaimed (but never crowned) king of England
- Edgar Figaro, a fictional king from Final Fantasy VI
