= Miquel d'Esplugues =

Spanish monk, writer and essayist (1870–1934)

Miquel d'Esplugues (Esplugues de Llobregat, Baix Llobregat, 1870 – Barcelona, 1934) was the religious name of the Catalan writer and Capuchin friar Pere Campreciós i Bosch.

He became orphan from father when he was six years-old. He studied Humanities in the Seminary of Barcelona and in 1887 he became Capuchin. He was teacher of philosophy in (1892) and of theology in (1898), and he became a priest in 1893. As responsible and vicar in capite of the Capuchin Navarrese-Catalan province, in 1900 he achieved the restoration of the ancient Catalan province and he was appointed provincial governor (1905–1915 and 1918–1921).

In 1907 he founded and managed the review Estudios Franciscanos and in 1925 the first Catalan review about philosophy Criterion.

He had an important influence over the Catalan Regionalist League people and he was a close friend of Francesc Cambó. He organized also the Catalan Biblical Foundation and he was the president.

== Works ==
- Nostra Senyora de la Mercè. Estudi de psicologia ètnico-religiosa de Catalunya (1916). (in Catalan)
- Sant Francesc de Sales, esperit i màximes (1906). (in Catalan)
- Four volumes of comments about the Lord's Prayer (1920–1923). (in Catalan)
- Three volumes of Religious Philosophy Miscellany (1924–1927). The third one of them has the title of La vera efígie del Poverello (The Poverello's real face), and is about Francis of Assisi. (in Catalan)
- El missatge d'Israel: Israel, Jesús, Sant Pau (1934). (in Catalan)

== Bibliography ==
- A. Botti, La Spagna e la crisi modernista. Cultura, società civile e religiosa tra Otto e Novecento, Morcelliana, Brescia, 1987, pp. 141–148. (in Italian)
