= Mario Gimeno =

Spanish footballer

Personal information
- Full name: Mario Gimeno Alonso
- Date of birth: 5 October 1969 (age 57)
- Place of birth: Madrid, Spain
- Height: 1.72 m (5 ft 7 1/2 in)
- Position: Midfielder

Youth career
- Rayo Vallecano

Senior career*
Years	Team	Apps	(Gls)
1988–1990	Rayo Vallecano B		
1990–1995	Rayo Vallecano	26	(1)

International career
1991	Spain U21	1	(0)
1991	Spain U23	1	(0)
- * Club domestic league appearances and goals

Mario Gimeno Alonso, simply Mario (born 5 October 1969), is a Spanish retired footballer who played as a midfielder.
