= Criterion (journal) =

Criterion was the first philosophy journal in Catalan. It was founded by the Capuchin Miquel d'Esplugues, who was its first director also. Its periodicity was quarterly at first, between 1925 and 1936. During this period it supported the idea of Europe.

Criterion appeared again after the Spanish Civil War, now as a collection of philosophical and religious matters, en 1959. Basili de Rubí was the new beginner, and his successor was Àlvar Maduell for a short time. The collection ought to be a review, but the press laws of Francoist minister Manuel Fraga Iribarne did not authorize that, and the review had to close in 1969.
