= Edgar (restaurant) =

Former restaurant in Gatineau, Quebec, Canada

- Interactive map of Edgar

Restaurant information
- Established: October 1, 2010
- Closed: August 15, 2022
- Owner: Marysol Foucault
- Head chef: Marysol Foucault
- Food type: Canadian
- Location: 60 Rue Bégin, Gatineau, Quebec, Canada
- Coordinates: 45.4208°N 75.7451°W
- Seating capacity: 35

Edgar (also referred to as: Chez Edgar) was a restaurant located in the Hull district of Gatineau, Quebec.

== History ==
The business was opened by Marysol Foucault in October 2010, in a building she purchased in a residential neighbourhood on the edges of Hull. The restaurant was named after Foucault's father.

Edgar operated six days a week, and only for brunch. Due to its small size and popularity, was known to have large line-ups and long waits for individuals wishing to eat there. The restaurant's signature dish was a take on the Dutch Baby - topping it with apples, aged cheddar, maple syrup, and pork belly.

At opening, the restaurant only seated 11, before expanding to 35 seats indoors after Foucault purchased the adjoining business and expanded Edgar's space. The business also sat up to 40 guests on its patio when weather permitted.

Foucault closed the restaurant on August 15, 2022, citing a wish to spend more time with family. In addition to closing the restaurant, Foucault also sold the building in which it was located.

== Recognition ==
La Presse restaurants columnist Eve Dumas praised Edgar for its ever-changing, ingredient-driven menu and standout desserts, calling it a tiny restaurant with a big heart. She highlighted the chef Marysol Foucault's creativity, commitment to local sourcing, and the warm, bustling brunch atmosphere.

During its years of operation, Edgar was often ranked at the top of Tripadvisor lists for the best restaurant in Gatineau.

In 2013, Edgar was featured on Food Network television series You Gotta Eat Here!. Show host John Catucci called Foucault's signature Dutch Baby “a bowlful of baked love ... bursting with a gorgeous sweet filling."
