= Bonaventura Ubach =

Spanish Benedictine and orientalist (1879–1960)

Bonaventura Ubach OSB
- Church: Catholic Church

Orders
- Ordination: 1902

Personal details
- Born: April 2, 1879 Barcelona, Spain
- Died: February 19, 1960 (aged 80) Santa Maria de Montserrat Abbey
- Occupation: Orientalist, Biblical scholar
- Education: École Biblique

Bonaventura Ubach i Medir, or Buenaventura Ubach Medir, (Barcelona, 2 April 1879 - Montserrat, 19 February 1960) was a Benedictine monk of the Santa Maria de Montserrat Abbey, orientalist and biblical scholar.

As a traveler and student of the territory and languages of the Middle East, he compiled a large collection of archeological material. It is exhibited in the Museum of Montserrat and was a decisive contributor to its creation. In 1929, he began the project of the Biblia de Montserrat, a translation of the Bible into the Catalan language.

== Biography ==
After entering Santa Maria de Montserrat Abbey in 1894, he was ordained a priest in 1902. He traveled to Jerusalem in 1906 and studied in the École Biblique where he met Marie-Joseph Lagrange. In 1907 he was named professor in the Syriac seminary of Jerusalem, and when he returned to Montserrat in 1910, he laid the foundations for the orientalist museums of the monastery. He was a professor of the Syriac language and the Hebrew language at the Anselmianum in Rome from 1913 to 1922. He lived in the Middle East, where he collaborated with the Syriac Catholic Church in producing an edition of liturgical texts with Patriarch Ignatius Ephrem II Rahmani. After leaving Jerusalem, he participated in a regionalist project led by Francesc Cambó and the Fundación San Dámaso to produce a Bible in the Catalan language. Subsequent disagreements led him to abandon the project and direct his own project in producing the Biblia de Montserrat. In 1928, he acquired 200 Egyptian papyri, considered to be the first private collection of such manuscripts in Spain. He returned to Montserrat in 1951, where he regularly celebrated liturgy according to the Syriac Rite.

== Works ==
- El Sinaí: viatge per l'Aràbia Pètria cercant les petjades d'Israel (1913; second edition 1955; third edition 2011)
- Legisne toram? (1919)
- La Bíblia. Versió dels textos originals i notes pels monjos de Montserrat
  - El Gènesi (1926)
  - L'Èxode (1927)
  - Levític (1927)
  - Els Nombres (1928)
  - El Deuteronomi (1928)
  - El Psalteri (1932)
  - I i II de Samuel (1952)
  - Litúrgia siríaca de Sant Jaume (1952)
  - Dietari d'un viatge per les regions de l'Iraq (1922-1923) (2009)

== Bibliography ==
- "Bonaventura Ubach i Medir". Gran Enciclopèdia Catalana. Enciclopèdia Catalana. (in Catalan)
- Díaz i Carbonell, Romuald. Dom Bonaventura Ubach: l'home, el monjo, el biblista, Aedos, 1962. (2ª edición, 2012 )
