= Emissions Database for Global Atmospheric Research =

- Funding: European Commission
- Website: https://data.jrc.ec.europa.eu/collection/edgar

The Emissions Database for Global Atmospheric Research (EDGAR) is a joint project of the European Commission Joint Research Centre and the Netherlands Environmental Assessment Agency which estimates emissions of all greenhouse gases, air pollutants and aerosols.
