= Edgar, West Virginia =

Unincorporated community in West Virginia, United States

- Unincorporated community
- Location within West Virginia Location within the United States
- Coordinates: 38°40′44″N 81°42′14″W
- Country: United States
- State: West Virginia
- County: Jackson
- Elevation: 984 ft (300 m)
- Time zone: UTC-5 (Eastern (EST))
  - Summer (DST): UTC-4 (EDT)
- GNIS ID: 1559922

Edgar was an unincorporated community in Jackson County, West Virginia.
