= Edgard Lévy =

French resistance member

- Born: 4 January 1905; Metz, France
- Died: 14 June 1944 (aged 39); Saint-Flour, France
- Occupation: French resistance fighter

Edgard Lévy (4 January 1905 – 14 June 1944) was a French Jewish Resistance fighter during the Second World War. He was executed by Germans in 1944.

== Life ==
Lévy was born in Metz in 1905 as the son of Émile and Françoise Lévy. He grew up and lived there until the German invasion of France in 1940. The invasion forced the Lévy family to leave Metz. Two years later, in 1942, Edgard joined the "Sixth" branch of the Eclaireuses et Eclaireurs israélites de France resistance group, using the pseudonym "Etienne Sibille." Along with several other people, he worked in the Limoges area to secure false identification papers for Jews to escape deportation and find places for those hunted by the Nazis to hide. After the invasion of Normandy on 6 June 1944, Lévy and his comrades received orders to join a maquis group. Four days later, he was arrested by Germans in Saint-Flour, along with Raymond Winter and the brothers Marcel and Roger Gradwohl. On 14 June, after a skirmish between German soldiers and resistance fighters that left a high-ranking Gestapo officer dead, Lévy, Winter, and the Gradwohl brothers were executed along with twenty-one other non-Jewish civilians.

Lévy is memorialized on the stele of the Hôtel Terminus in Saint-Flour, on the war memorial in Ennery, and on a plaque inside Metz's synagogue. He was cited for acts of resistance after his death.
