= Edgardo Parizzia =

Argentine basketball player

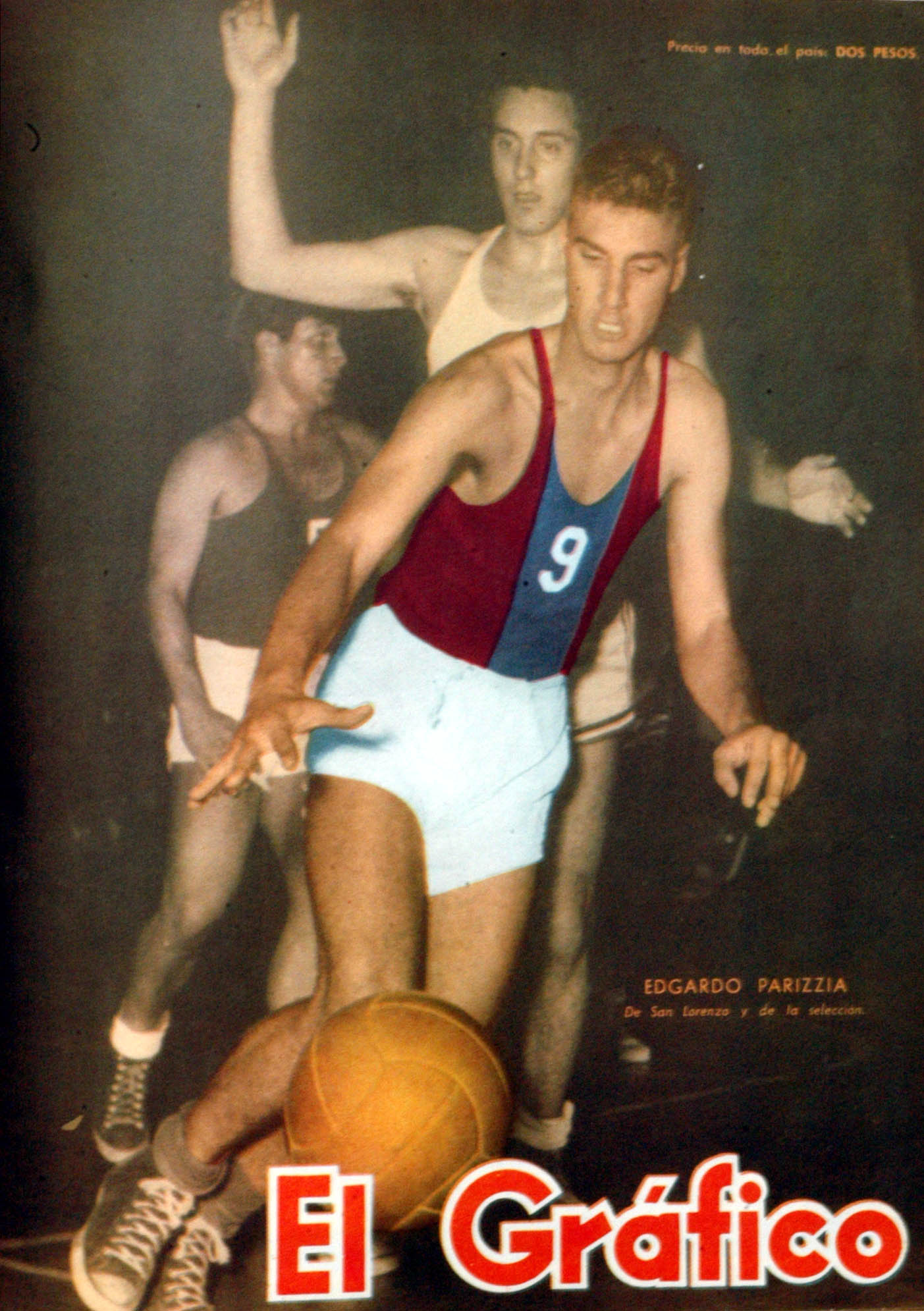
- Edgardo Parizzia in El Gráfico, 1956

Personal information
- Born: 24 November 1935
- Died: 6 March 2010 (aged 74)
Medals
Men's basketball
Representing Argentina
Pan American Games
Silver medal – second place	1955 Mexico City	Team

Edgardo Parizzia (24 November 1935 – 6 March 2010), also known as Edgard Domingo Parizzia, was an Argentine former basketball player.
