= Edgardo Obregón =

American soccer player (born 1999)

Edgardo Obregónh
Personal information
- Full name: Edgardo Andre Obregón Hands
- Date of birth: 30 May 1999 (age 27)
- Place of birth: Mexico City, Mexico
- Position: Midfielder

Team information
- Current team: Florida Atlantic

Youth career
- 2010–2012: C.F. Pachuca
- 2012–2018: Club América

College career
Years	Team	Apps	(Gls)
2018	Reinhardt University	16	(6)
2019–2022	Florida Atlantic University	28	(1)

Senior career*
Years	Team	Apps	(Gls)
2019	Weston FC	11 Y	(0)

International career
	Mexico National Team U15	7	
- * Club domestic league appearances and goals as of 23 June 2019

Edgardo Andre Obregón Hands (born 30 May 1999) is an American former soccer player who recently played for Florida Atlantic University in NCAA Division I.

== Biography ==
Obregón was born on 30 May 1999, in Miami, Florida, to Mexican parents. As a kid, nicknamed Gato ("Cat"), he played for and represented in friendly, youth tournaments the teams of Club America, F.C. Barcelona and A.C. Milan.

His designated position is attacking midfielder, the same as his reported idol, Kaká.

In 2008, there were media reports that he committed to A.C. Milan, although the club did not make any official announcement. In 2009, FIFA strengthened its oversight of transfers of under-age football players. All transfers of under-age players must henceforth be submitted to and approved by a sub-committee of the FIFA Players' Status Committee, along with any applications for a minor player to be registered for the first time in a country where they are not a national. FIFA's toughened stance on underage players' signings was behind their April 2, 2014, decision to impose on Barcelona "a 14-month transfer ban for breaking rules on signing international players under 18," along with a fine of 450,000 Swiss Francs.
