= Basili de Rubí =

Catalan Capuchin friar

Basili de Rubí (Rubí, 1899 – Barcelona, 1986) was the religious name of the Catalan Order of Friars Minor Capuchin friar Francesc Malet i Vallhonrat.

He became Capuchin in 1927. During the Spanish Civil War he was nearly murdered, but he managed to escape and he moved to Italy. There he began his research about the history of the Capuchin order in Catalonia. Once the war was over in Spain, he came back to Catalonia, and he was appointed director of the Capuchin seminaries of Olot and Barcelona, among other tasks.

He was a historian, founder of the Franciscalia society in 1948, publisher of the review Estudios Franciscanos since its restoration (1948) and beginner and director of the Criterion collection (about Philosophy) in 1959.

== Works ==
- Reforma de Regulares a principios del siglo XIX (1943). (in Catalan)
- Necrologi dels frares menors caputxins de Catalunya i Balears (1945). (in Catalan)
- Art pessebrístic (1947). (in Catalan)
- La última hora de la tragedia. Hacia una revisión del caso Verdaguer (1958). (in Spanish)
- El padre Bernardino de Manlleu (1962). (in Spanish)
- Les corts generals de Pau Claris (1976). (in Catalan)
- Un segle de vida caputxina a Catalunya (1978). (in Catalan)
- Els caputxins a la Barcelona del segle XVIII (1984). (in Catalan)
