= Edgardo Arasa =

Argentine footballer (born 1961)

Personal information
- Full name: Edgardo José Arasa Saita
- Date of birth: 15 September 1961 (age 65)
- Place of birth: Rosario, Argentina
- Position: Defender

Youth career
- Rosario Central

Senior career*
Years	Team	Apps	(Gls)
1982	Unión Santa Fe	9	(0)
1983	Atlético Concepción	1	(0)
	Río Cuarto	–	(–)
	Renato Cesarini Río IV	–	(–)
1984	Chacarita Juniors	3	(0)
1985–1986	Atlanta	22	(1)
1988–1992	Everton	105	(2)
1992	→ Santiago Wanderers (loan)	–	(–)
1993–1994	Deportes Arica		

Managerial career
- 2008–2009: AA Jorge Griffa (youth)
- 2010–2017: AA Jorge Griffa
- * Club domestic league appearances and goals

Edgardo José Arasa Saita (September 15, 1961) is an Argentine former footballer who played for clubs from Argentina and Chile.

== Career ==
A football defender, Arasa played for Unión de Santa Fe, Atlético Concepción, Chacarita Juniors and Atlanta in his homeland. In addition, he played for Río Cuarto and Renato Cesarini Río IV at regional level.

In 1988, Arasa moved to Chile and spent five seasons with Everton de Viña del Mar in the top division, with a stint on loan with Santiago Wanderers in the 1992 Copa Chile.

Arasa ended his career with Deportes Arica in the Chilean Segunda División.

As a football coach, Arasa has worked for AA Jorge Griffa in his city of birth.

== Personal life ==
His son, Lautaro Edgardo Arasa, who was born in Chile when he played for Everton, is a former footballer who played for clubs in Argentina, Uruguay and Italy.
