= Eadgar =

Eadgar or Edgar is an Anglo-Saxon given name and can refer to the following individuals:

- Edgar of England, (c. 943 or 944 – 975), King of England
- Eadgar of Hereford, (died c. 930), Bishop of Hereford
- Edgar of Lindsey, (died between 716 and 731), Bishop of Lindsey
- Eadgar of London (died between 789 and 793), Bishop of London
- Edgar Ætheling (c. 1052 – 1125 or after), claimant to the English throne in 1066
- Edgar of Scotland (c. 1074–1107), King of Scotland
- William the Trouvère (fl. 1200), Anglo-Norman poet; born Adgar or Aedgar

== See also ==
- Edgar (disambiguation)
