= Nolasc del Molar =

Nolasc del Molar (el Molar; 1902 – 1983 in Barcelona) was the name of religion of the Catalan capuchin friar Daniel Rebull i Muntanyola. He entered in the Capuchin order in 1918 and he became a priest in 1926. He published several works about patristics, history and literature, and he made also important editions of ancient texts. He was collaborator of the Catalan Biblical Foundation and of the Bernat Metge Foundation. Many other works and translations of him were unpublished. His last years he signed with the name of Nolasc Rebull.

== Works ==
- Consueta del misteri de la gloriosa Santa Àgata (1953).(in Catalan)
- Consueta de Sant Eudald (1954).(in Catalan)
- Per les cançons d'un terrelloner (1956) (Compilation of popular songs that was published with a pseudonym).(in Catalan)
- Una poesia religiosa del segle XIII (1953-1957).(in Catalan)
- Eiximenis (1960).(in Catalan)
- Translation and comment of L'himne acatist a la Mare de Déu (1961).(in Catalan)
- Perfil espiritual de Eiximenis Article in Revista de Girona 22 (1963) (in Spanish)
- Procés d'un bruixot (1968).(in Catalan)
- La Llegenda àuria de Jaume de Voràgine segons un manuscrit de Vic (1975).(in Catalan)
