= Francesc Gimeno i Arasa =

Spanish painter and graphic artist

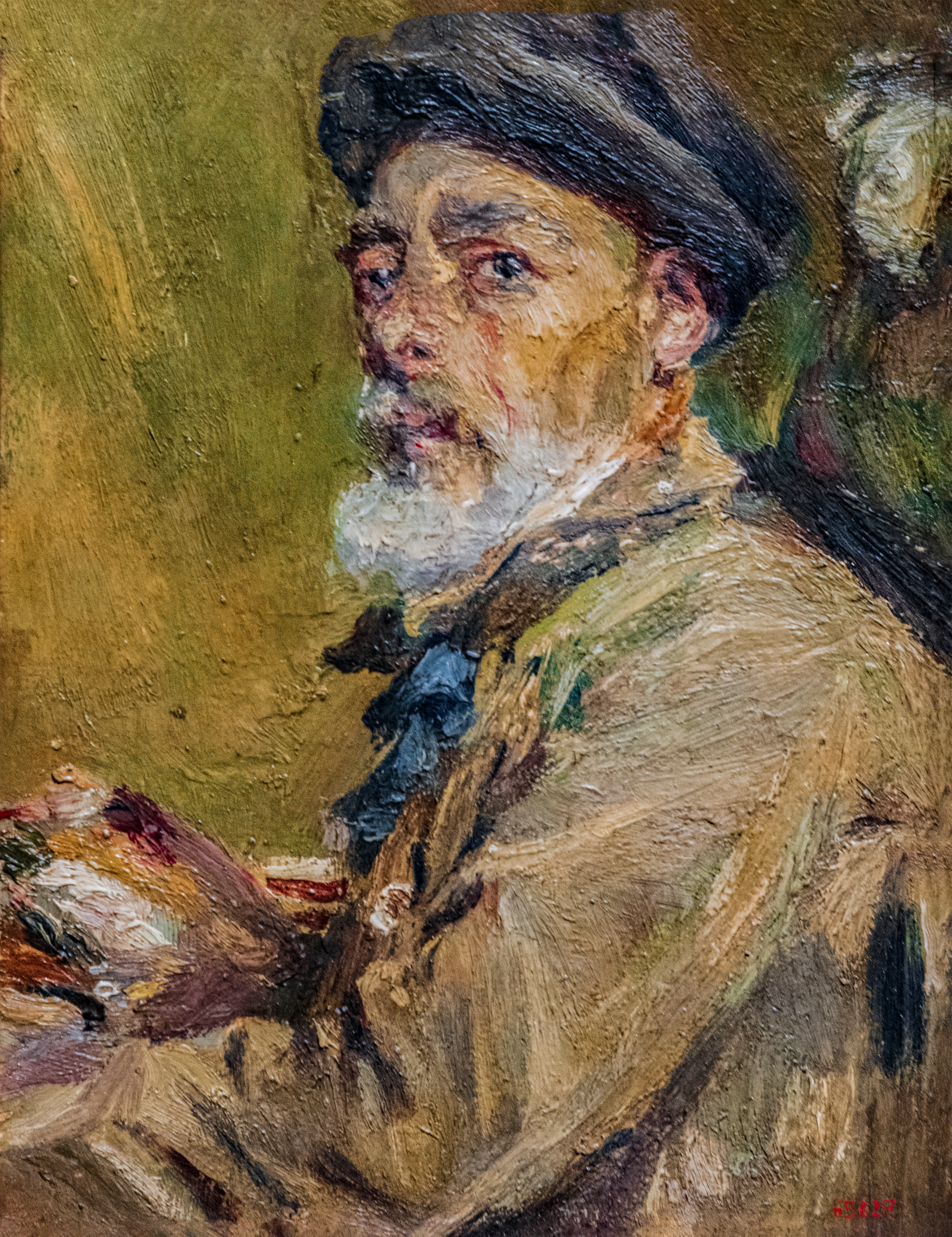
- Self-portrait with Cap (1917)
- Born: Francesc Gimeno i Arasa; 4 February 1858; Tortosa, Catalonia, Spain
- Died: 22 November 1927 (aged 69); Barcelona, Catalonia, Spain
- Known for: Painting
- Movement: Realism

Francesc Gimeno i Arasa (4 February 1858 – 22 November 1927) was a Spanish painter and graphic artist best known for his landscapes, city scenes and self-portraits.

== Biography ==
After completing his primary education, in 1880, he moved to Barcelona, where he worked as a decorative painter in the studios of Manuel Marqués (born c. 1840). At the same time, he and a few friends operated a small art academy. With the assistance of a lithographer named Francisco Tió, he was able to move to Madrid in 1884, to study at the Real Academia de Bellas Artes de San Fernando with the landscape painter, Carlos de Haes, and make copies of Velázquez at the Museo del Prado.

In 1887, he moved to Torroella de Montgrí and, two years later, settled on the Costa Brava, where he painted maritime scenes. In 1888, he received honorable mention at the Exposición Universal de Barcelona. Upon returning to Barcelona the following year, he shut himself up in an old decorator's studio and, for unknown reasons, refused to participate in the artistic community there.

It was not until 1915 that, strongly urged by his friends, he held a small private exhibition at the Dalmau Galleries. It was then that he reestablished contact with a childhood friend, Doctor Francesc Bedós, who became his patron. After that, he spent long periods at the Doctor's home in Sabadell, painting for a small group of local customers. He participated in a few exhibitions; notably in 1917 in Barcelona and 1920 in Begur.

He created approximately 200 self-portraits, which bear little stylistic resemblance to his other works. He had a rough temperament, few friends and, despite some success, was usually mired in poverty. The writer, Josep Pla, described him as a "primitive, marginal, anarchic being" who painted by instinct.

In 2006, the Museu Nacional d'Art de Catalunya organized an exhibit entitled "Francesc Gimeno, un artista maleït" (A painter cursed/damned).

His eldest son, Martí Gimeno i Massaguer also became a painter, as well as a sculptor and art critic.

== Gallery ==
Paintings

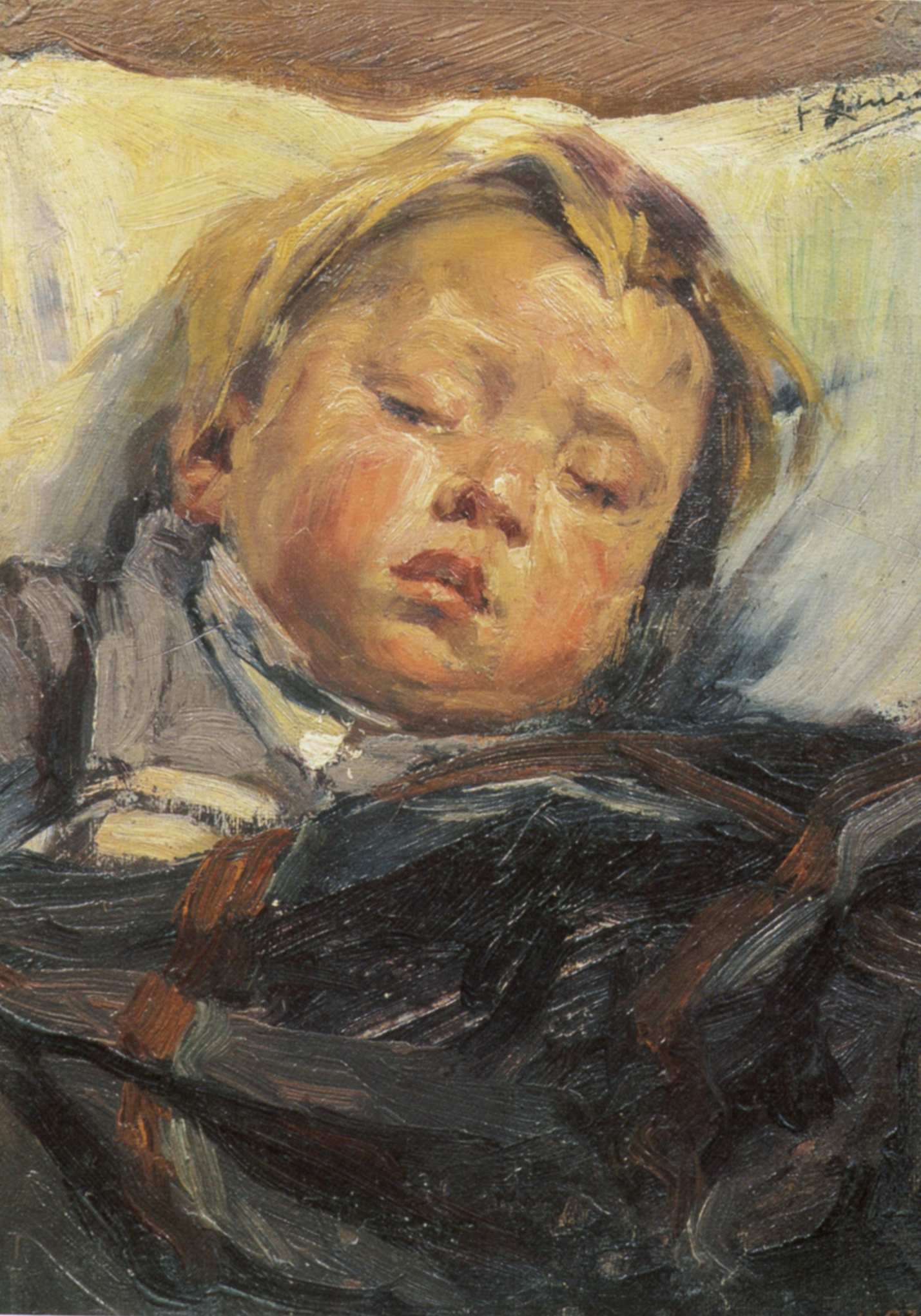
Boy's Head

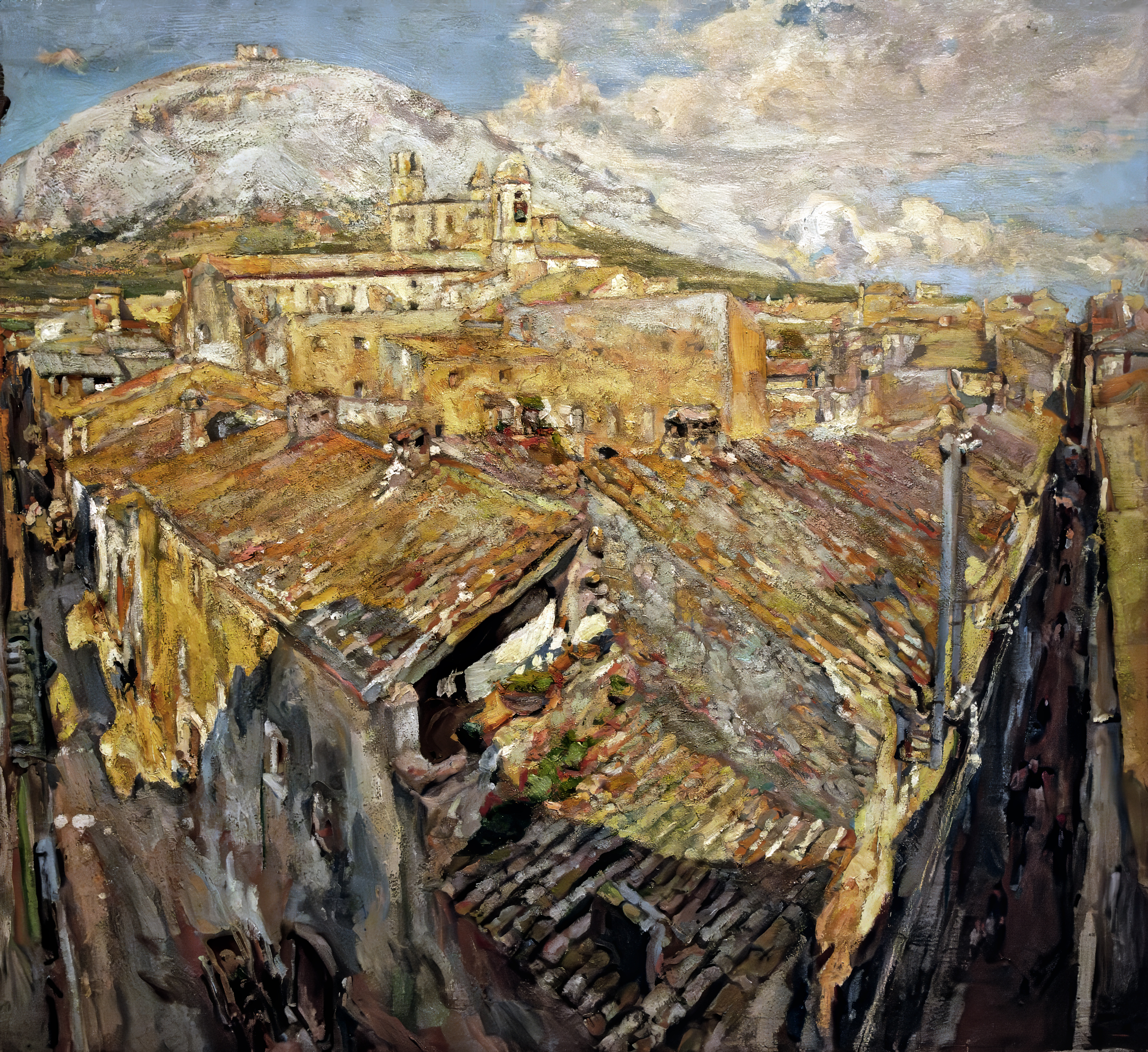
Town in Emporda

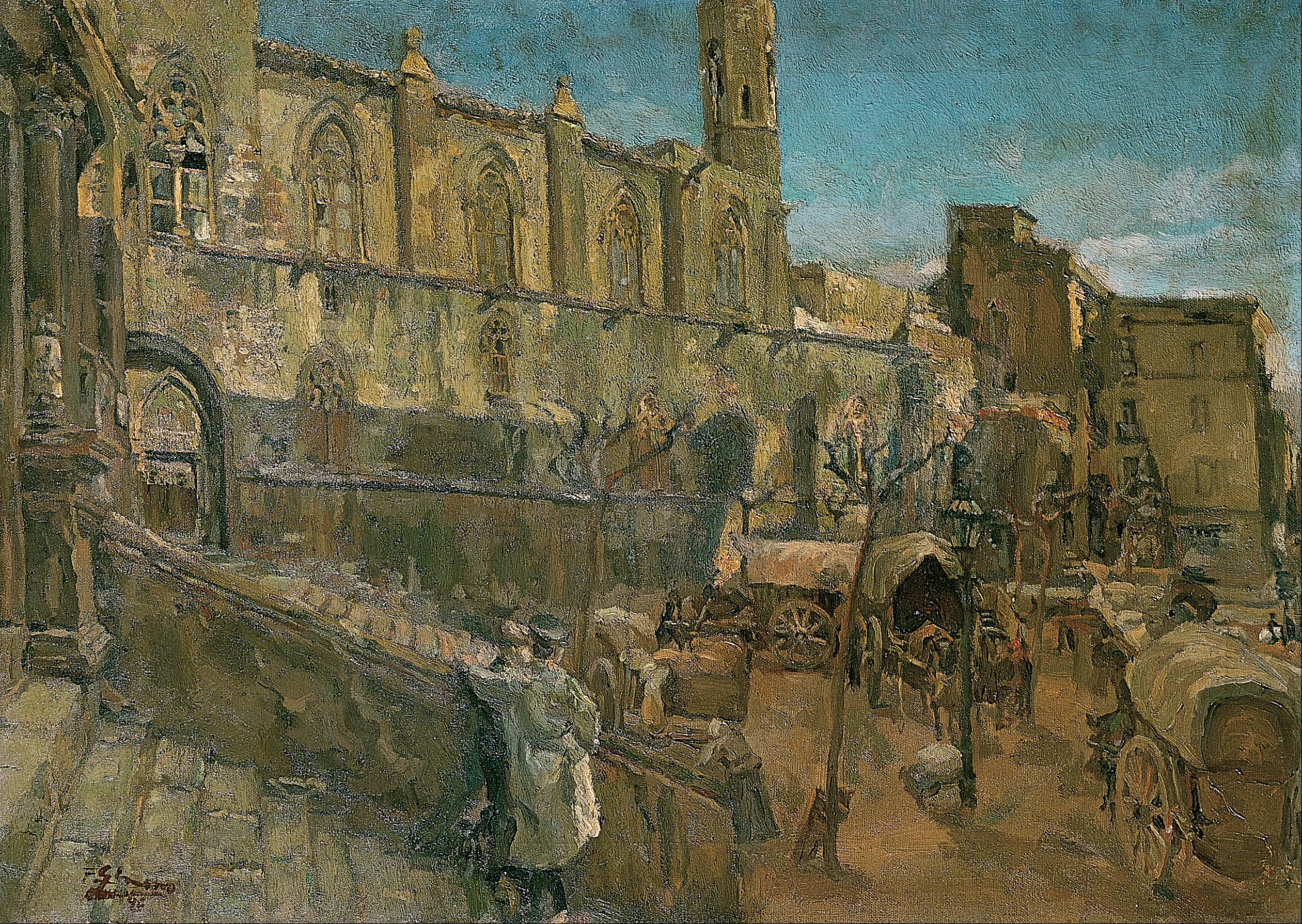
Plaza del Rey

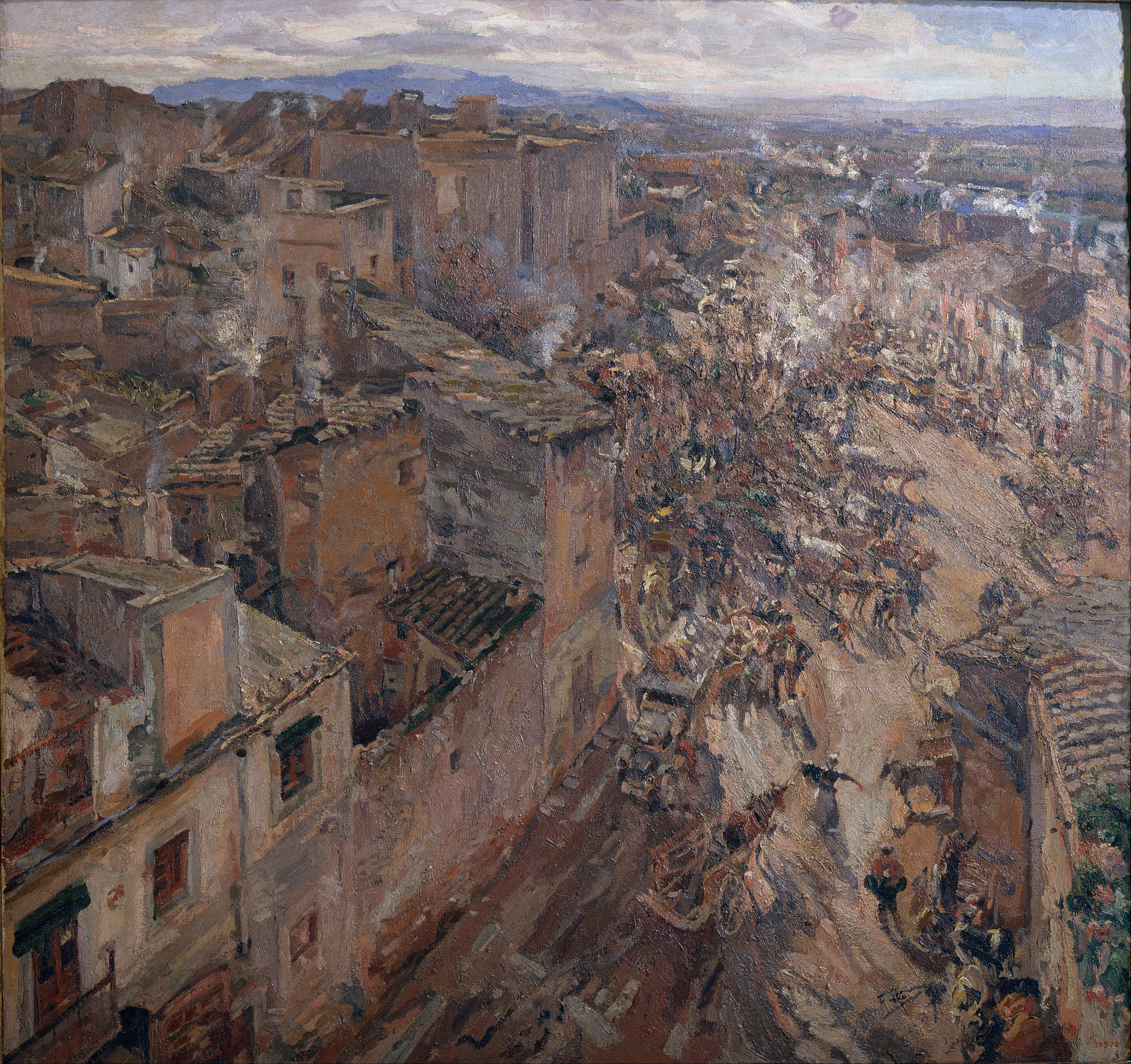
Market day in Torroella

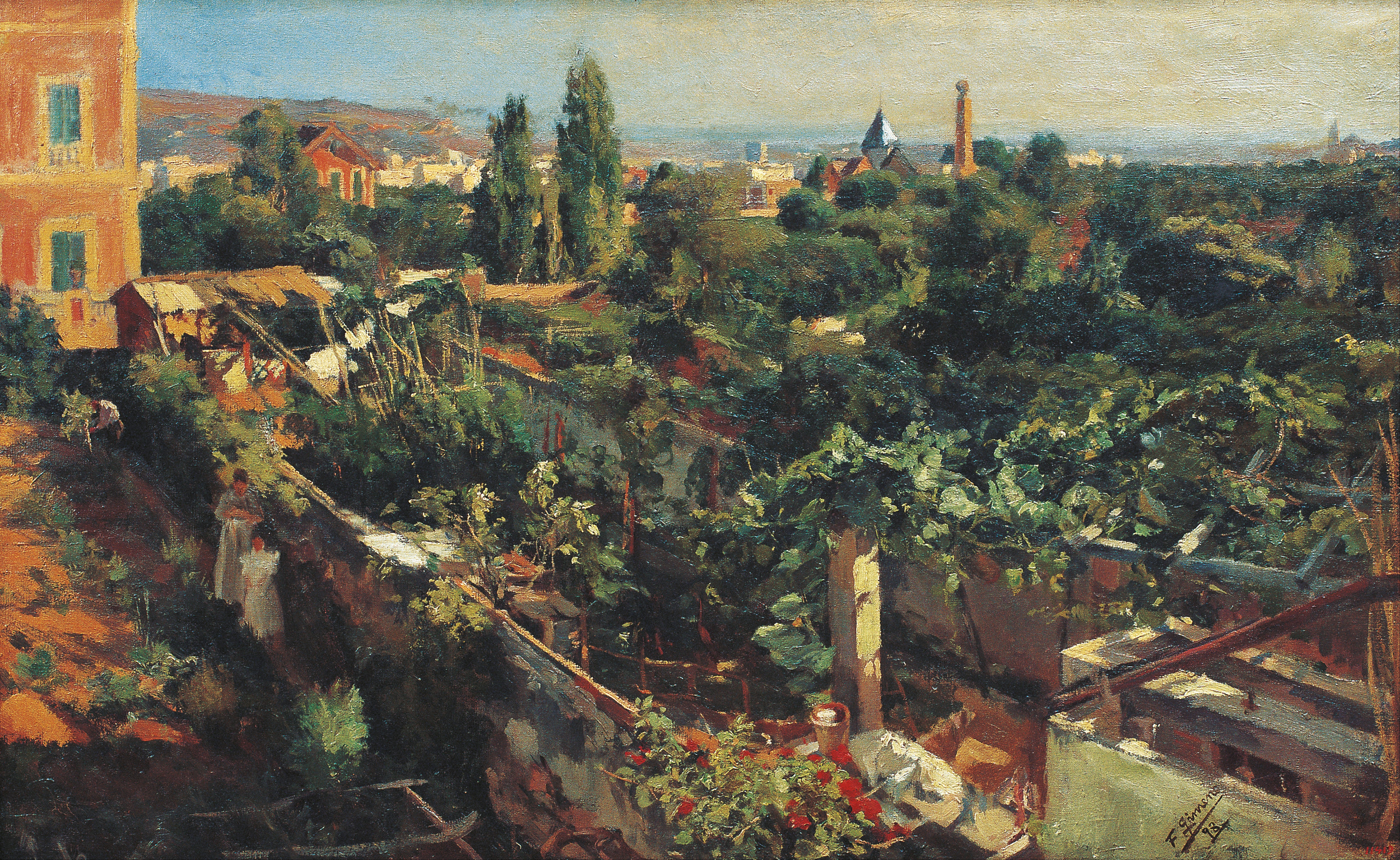
The Grapevines

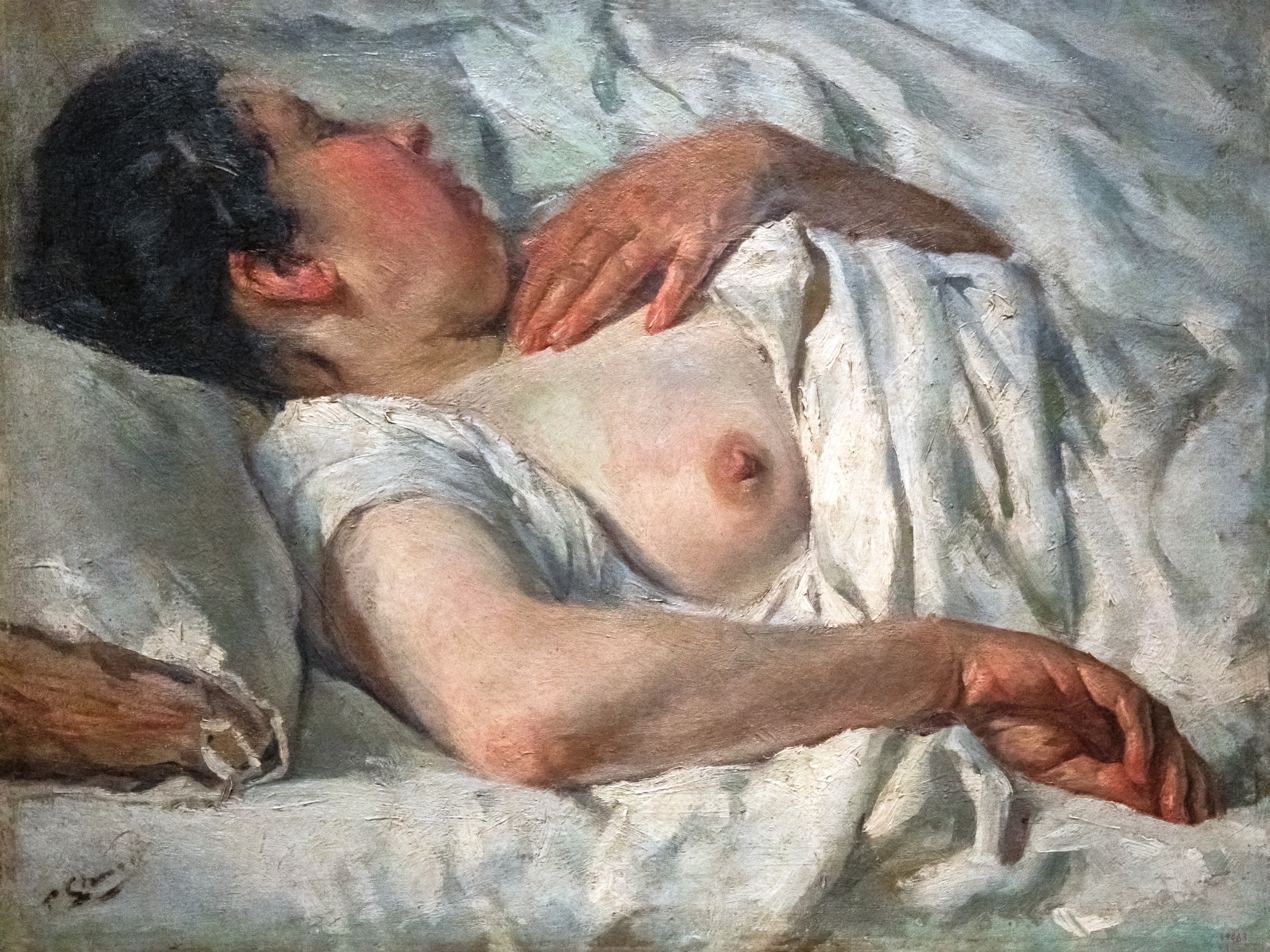
Woman Sleeping

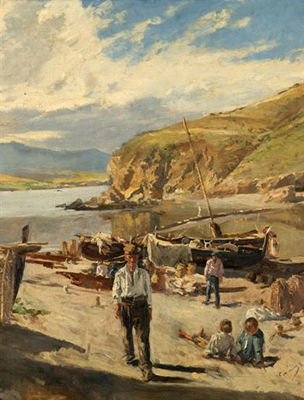
On the Beach

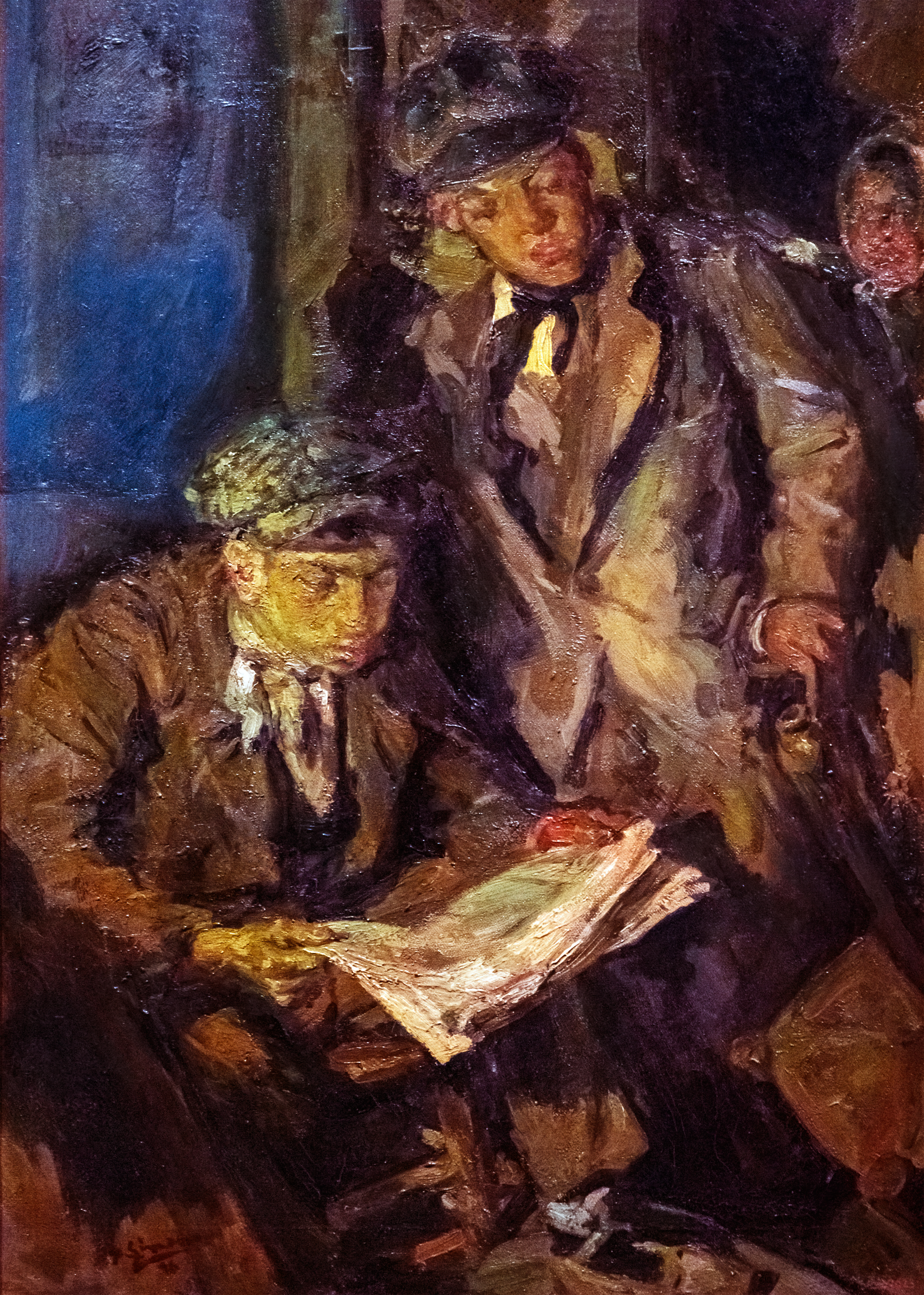
Reading the Newspaper

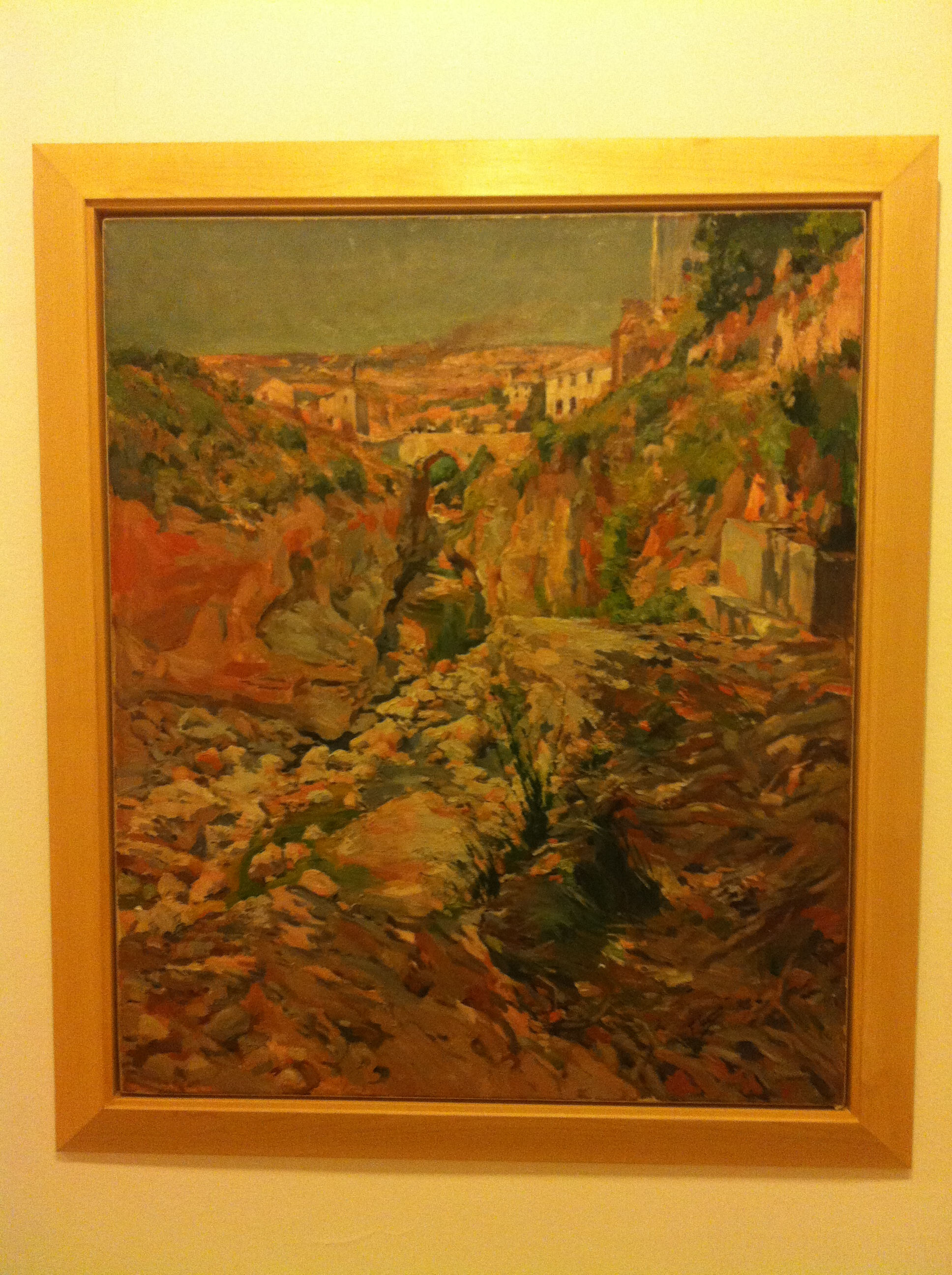
The Amentera Bridge

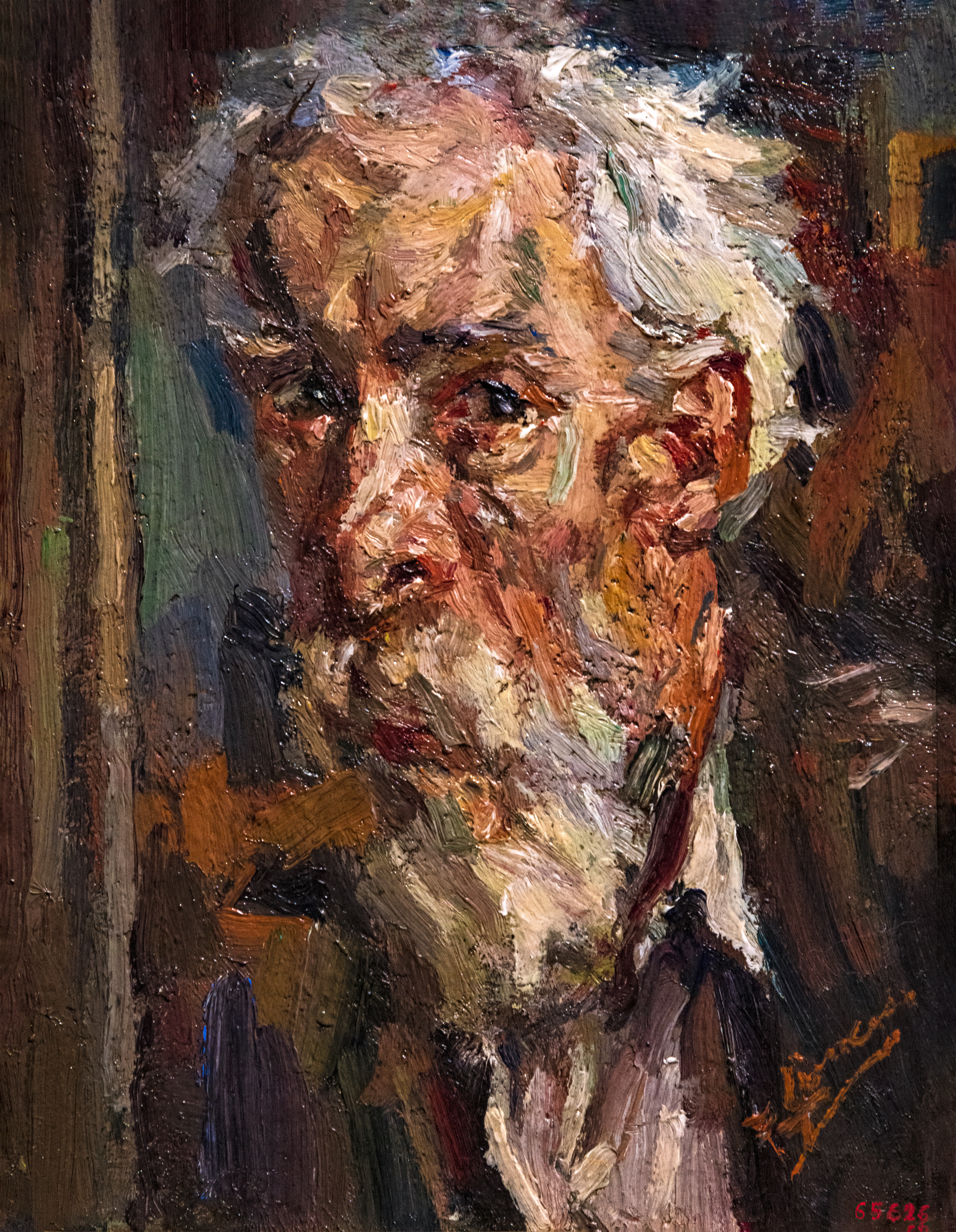
Self-portrait (1925)
