= Seva =

Seva may refer to:

- Sevā, volunteer work offered to the divine in Indian religions
- Seva (Puerto Rico), a fictional town described in the novel Seva by Luis López Nieves
- "Seva" (short story), by Puerto Rican author Luis López Nieves
- Seva, Barcelona, a municipality in the comarca of Osona, Catalonia, Spain
- Seva, Ghana, an island in the Volta Region of Ghana
- Seva Canada Society, a Vancouver-based non-profit organization that fights blindness in the developing world
- Seva Foundation, an American non-profit foundation that fights blindness and poverty
- Ševa, a principal character in the Croatian "anti-show" Nightmare Stage
- Seva (given name), a diminutive for the East Slavic name Vsevolod
- Stand-up Extravehicular activity, an activity in which an astronaut partially emerges into space

== See also ==
- Seva Sadan (disambiguation)
- Sewa (disambiguation)
- Sevak (disambiguation)
- Sewak (disambiguation)
- Ceva (disambiguation)
