= Sewak (name) =

Sewak ot Sevak is an Indian surname meaning "servant" (from Sanskrit seva). Notable people with the surname include:

- Deenanath Sewak, Indian politician
- Jigneshkumar Sevak, Indian politician
- Ram Sewak (disambiguation), multiple people

== See also ==
- Mike Sewak (born 1958), American football player and coach
- Sevak (name)
- Sivak (surname)
- Sevak (disambiguation)
