= Estelle Irizarry =

Costa Rican literary professor

- Born: November 13, 1937; Paterson, New Jersey, U.S.
- Died: March 17, 2017 (aged 79)

Estelle Irizarry (November 13, 1937 – March 17, 2017) was professor emeritus of Hispanic literature at Georgetown University, Washington, DC. She was one of the first historians to provide objective evidence based on scientific criteria and methodology to solve the mysteries surrounding the identity of Christopher Columbus.

Irizarry authored books about Spanish authors such as Francisco Ayala, Rafael Dieste, Odón Betanzos Palacios and E. Fernández Granell, as well as Spanish writers-painters of the 20th century.

== Biography ==
Estelle Diane Roses was born on November 13, 1937, in Paterson, New Jersey. Her father, Morris Jerome Roses, owned a small office and card supply store, and her mother, Ceil Pearl Roses, was a homemaker.

In 1955, Dr. Irizarry graduated from Eastside High School in Paterson, New Jersey, later made famous by the 1987 film Lean on Me. She received her B.A. from Montclair State College (now University) in 1959; her M.A. from Rutgers University in 1963; and her Ph.D. in Philosophy from George Washington University in 1970. In the early 1960s, Dr. Irizarry also studied and later taught for a time at the University of Puerto Rico. It was during that time that she met Manuel Antonio Irizarry (b. 1928 – d. 2014), of Rosario, Puerto Rico, whom she married in 1963.

=== Teacher ===
In 1970, Dr. Irizarry was appointed Professor of Spanish at Georgetown University, Washington, D.C. From 1993 to 2000, she was Editor-in-Chief of Hispania, the quarterly journal of the American Association of Teachers of Spanish and Portuguese, which includes articles on pedagogy, literature, linguistics, and technology-assisted language instruction related to the Hispanic and Luso-Brazilian worlds.

=== Author ===
Dr. Irizarry was the author of 40 books and over 150 articles in international journals. Dr. Irizarry wrote books on individual Spanish authors Francisco Ayala, Rafael Dieste, Odón Betanzos Palacios, and Eugenio Granell, as well as thematic topics: literary jokes in The Literary Joke in Our Days (1979) and writer-painters in Spanish Writers-Painters of the 20th Century (1991).

A specialist in literary computing, Irizarry showed what could be achieved with Hispanic examples in Informática y literatura (1997, jointly edited by Proyecto/A Ediciones and the University of Puerto Rico). Another contribution of this type was his annotated edition, with a grant from the Fifth Centennial Commission of the Discovery of America and Puerto Rico, of the first novels published in the New World, Infortunios de Alonso Ramírez, resolving the question of authorship with computer analysis, showing that the Puerto Rican protagonist Ramírez was a co-author.

In Puerto Rican literature, she has published seven titles on Enrique Laguerre, in addition to the introduction to Ricardo Alegría's four-volume centennial compilation of Laguerre's complete novels. Other titles include Studies on Enrique A. Laguerre (Institute of Puerto Rican Culture, 2005), a critical edition of Seva by Luis López Nieves (Cara y Cruz, Grupo Editorial Norma, 2006), The Art of Distortion in Luis Lopez Nieves (Terranova), and, in Ediciones Puerto, three books on José Elías Levis: The Voice that Broke the Silence: The Singular Novels of J. Elías Levis in Puerto Rico Post-1898, and critical editions of New Life and The Dregs Heap in two versions.

=== Personal life and death ===
Irizarry died on March 17, 2017, from complications related to Parkinson's disease, which she was diagnosed with in 1999. She was preceded in death by Manuel, her husband of 50 years, who died on August 28, 2014. She is survived by her three sons, Michael Carl Irizarry, Steven Edward Irizarry, and Nelson Paul Irizarry, as well as seven grandchildren.

== DNA of the writings of Christopher Columbus ==
In 2009, she presented the book The DNA of the Writings of Christopher Columbus in Madrid, where she concludes that Columbus wrote in Catalan and was a Jewish convert. After researching Columbus's letters, she notes that some are punctuated with semicolons and periods [/.] [/] [//].and this "style of punctuation obeyed a geographical arrangement, that those in Castile did not use commas as it was typical of the Catalan-speaking lands of the old Crown of Aragon", and she added: "In the book the navigator's writing system is compared with manuscripts from Galicia, Portugal, Italy, Tarragona, Castile, Barcelona, Ibiza, Europe or Genoa, among others, and so far the (linguistic) DNA points to Ibiza», theory supported as well by Nito Verdera.

== Work ==
Irizarry received the Grand National Prize of the International Book Fair in Puerto Rico in 2010. Her latest works are an updated edition of Alonso Ramírez's Misfortunes and a new fiction - Christopher Columbus's love letter to Queen Isabel.

- The Surrealist Inventiveness of EF Granell, Insula, Madrid, 1976.
- Studies on Rafael Dieste (Broken memory: exiles and heterodoxies. Studies Series)
- The Art of Distortion in Luis Lopez Nieves
- Writer-Painters of Contemporary Spain, Georgetown University, Twayne Publishers, Boston, 1984.
- The Voice That Broke the Silence: The Singular Novelistic of J. Elias Levis in Puerto Rico Post-1898
- The novels The Dunghill (1899) and The Dunghill (1901), 2008.
- The DNA of Christopher Columbus's writings, 2009.
- Christopher Columbus' Love Letter to Queen Isabella, 2011.

== Awards and honors ==
- Tomás Barros Essay Prize, 1990
- Literature Award, Puerto Rico Institute in New York, 1996
- Full member of the North American Academy of the Spanish Language and corresponding member of the Royal Spanish Academy, 1995
- Cross of Spain of the Civil Order of Alfonso X the Wise, Ministry of Culture of Spain, 1998.
- National Grand Prize of the International Book Fair in Puerto Rico, 2010.
