= New history =

New history may refer to:

- A disciplinary approach that attempts to use history to understand contemporary problems, co-founded by James Harvey Robinson in the early 20th century
- Nouvelle histoire, a French movement in learning that de-emphasized rote learning
- New Mormon history, a style of reporting the history of Mormonism
- Doubting Antiquity School, a historiographical approach to Chinese historical sources begun in the 1910s and 1920s
- Institut Nova Història (New History Institute), a Catalan cultural foundation
- "New History" (Grey's Anatomy), an episode of the TV series Grey's Anatomy
- "New History", song by Casiopea from Active, 1992

== See also ==
- New Historians
- New historicism
