= Sivak =

Sivak may refer to:

- Sibak, Chaharmahal and Bakhtiari, a village also known as Sivak, in Chaharmahal and Bakhtiari Province, Iran
- Sivak (surname)
