= Sewak =

Sewak may refer to:

- Sewak, Sanskrit term for servant, see seva (Indian religions)
- Sevayat, a term for servitors of Indian deity Jagannath, related to Jagannath Temple, Puri
- Sewak (name), an Indian name (including a list of people with the name)
- Sewak (film), a 1975 Bollywood film
- Miswak, or sewak, a teeth-cleaning twig

== See also ==
- Sevak (disambiguation)
- Sewa (disambiguation)
- Seva (disambiguation)
