= Thomas Mermall =

American Hispanist and professor (1937–2011)

- Born: July 25, 1937; Uzhhorod, now Ukraine
- Died: September 22, 2011 (aged 74); New York City

Academic work
- Era: 20th century
- Main interests: Spanish literature and philosophy
- Notable works: The rhetoric of humanism: Spanish culture after Ortega y Gasset; critical edition of Ortega y Gasset's The revolt of the masses

Thomas Mermall, Uzhhorod (in the Ruthenia region of Czechoslovakia, now Ukraine) July 25, 1937 – New York City, September 22, 2011, Hispanist and professor of Spanish literature. Mermall's studies focused primarily on modern Spanish literature and thought, primarily the developments after the Spanish Civil War, including analyses and commentaries on the works of José Ortega y Gasset, Unamuno, Pedro Laín Entralgo, Juan Rof Carballo and Francisco Ayala, as well as comments on the importance of the essay in Spanish literature.

== Biography ==
Thomas Mermall was a Hispanist born to a Jewish family in the town of Uzhhorod in the Carpathian Ruthenia of Eastern Europe, a town that is today the administrative enter of Zakarpattia Oblast in Ukraine. At the time of his birth the town was part of Czechoslovakia, although it was transferred to Hungary the following year. His family spoke Hungarian at home and Ruthenian with the neighbors, some of whom also spoke Yiddish. Mermall would study Czech and Russian at school before leaving Europe and eventually adding Spanish, English and a bit of Hebrew to his linguistic experience.

When the Nazis reached Uzhhorod in the spring of 1944, Mermall’s father, Gabriel, hoping to save his wife and child, returned from the Russian front where he had been part of a Hungarian motorized army unit. Mermall’s mother was too sick to travel, but he and his father fled into the forest where they were helped by a series of local residents until settling into a hayloft which housed a detachment of cavalry from the collaborationist Hungarian government, something which created a constant danger for them. Mermall’s mother was deported to Auschwitz where she died a few days after her family’s flight from the city. However, by what Mermall referred to as “the flip side of destiny” given the odds against his survival, he and his father were freed in November 1944 by the arrival of the Red Army. Thomas Mermall, it turned out, had been the only Jewish child in the entire region to have survived.

During their time in hiding Mermall’s father kept a diary, a diary he would later turn into an account of that experience and publish as “Seeds of Grace” in the book By the Grace of Strangers: Two Boys’ Rescue During the Holocaust. Steven Spielberg purchased the film rights to the story, although the project was never carried out.

In 1947 Thomas Mermall and his father managed to leave Europe and settle in Chile for three years before moving to the United States where his father’s brother lived. Mermall completed his studies in the US and became a naturalized citizen. He went on to become a full professor of Spanish Literature at Brooklyn College and formed part of the doctoral program of the City University of New York.

Mermall’s published works have included studies of Unamuno, Octavio Paz, Pedro Laín Entralgo, Juan Rof Carballo and Francisco Ayala. Mermall also produced a critical edition of Ortega y Gasset’s The revolt of the masses and published his own memoirs, also entitled Seeds of Grace [Semillas de la Gracia]. At the time of his death he was completing a translation of contemporary Spanish philosopher Javier Gomá’s book Ejemplaridad pública [Public exemplarity].

== Works ==
English

- 2005.“The art of love and interior landscape: José Jiménez Lozano´s spiritual analytic”, in Naturalezas del escribidor: Ofrenda de amigos a José Jiménez Lozano, A. P. Alencart (ed.), Salamanca: Trilce Ediciones, pp. 88–97.
- 1999. "Culture and essay in modern Spain", in Gies, David T. (ed.), The Cambridge companion to modern Spanish culture, Cambridge: Cambridge University Press, pp. 163–172.
- 1990. "The Chiasmus: Unamumo’s master trope", Publications of the Modern Language Association of America, (105:2), pp. 245–255.
- 1976. The rhetoric of humanism: Spanish culture after Ortega y Gasset, Bilingual Review Press. ISBN 978-0916950026.
- 1970. "Spain’s philosopher of hope", Thought (45:1), pp. 103–120.

Spanish

- 2012. "Ortega contra Pero Orgullo: estrategias retóricas en 'Meditación de la técnica'", Revista de tecnología, conocimiento y sociedad (1:1), pp. 1–10.
- 2011. Semillas de gracia: memorias de guerra, amor y amistad, Editorial Pre-Textos. ISBN 978-8415297253.
- 2006. “Mis españoles”, Revista de Occidente, (304), pp. 82–105.
- 2002. “Experiencia, teoría, retórica: el paradigma de Orega y Gasset”, in El ensayo entre la filosofía y la literatura, J. F. Casanova (ed.), Granada: Comares.
- 1998. Orega y Gasset, José, La rebelión de las masas, Thomas Mermall (ed.), Editorial Castalia. ISBN 978-8470397882.
- 1997. “Un ‘postmoderno’ inteligible: en torno al estilo filosófico de Ortega y Gasset”, Revista de Occidente, (192), pp. 47–58.
- 1994. "Entre epistema y doxa: el trasfondo retórico de la razón vital", Revista Hispanica Moderna, (47:1), pp. 72–85.
- 1994. “Estética y mística: El castillo interior de José Jiménez Lozano”, in José Jiménez Lozano, Premio Nacional de las Letras Españolas 1992, Ministerio de Cultura de España, 91-98.
- 1990. "Ortega's Velasquez and the Topics of Modernity", Hispanic Issues (5), pp. 223–242.
- 1990. “La ideología del ’98 bajo el franquismo”, in Divergencias y unidad, perspectivas sobre la generación del '98 y Antonio Machado, John P. Gabriel (ed.), Madrid: Editorial Origines, pp. 49–60.
- 1988. “Eros edificante: la plenitud modernista en la ensayística actual”, Cuadernos del Norte, (49).
- 1983. Las alegorías del poder en Francisco Ayala, Fundamentos. ISBN 978-8424503864
- 1983. "José Jiménez Lozano y la renovación del género religioso", Anthropos, (25), pp. 66–69.
- 1968. "Octavio Paz: El Laberinto de la Soledad y el sicoanálisis de la historia," Cuadernos Americanos (27:1), pp. 97–114
