= Ceva (disambiguation) =

Ceva is a town in Piedmont, Italy.

Ceva may also refer to:

== Places ==
- Marquisate of Ceva, a former independent state in Italy centered on the town of Ceva
- Ceva railway station, a railway station in the Italian town of Ceva
- Monte Ceva, a hill of the Veneto, Italy
- 12579 Ceva, an asteroid

== People ==
- Francesco Adriano Ceva (1580–1655), Roman Catholic Cardinal from Savoy
- Giovanni Ceva (1647–1734), Italian mathematician
- Tommaso Ceva (1648–1737), Italian Jesuit and mathematician, brother of Giovanni

== Other uses ==
- Battle of Ceva, a battle fought in 1796 near the Italian town of Ceva
- CEVA Logistics, a logistics company
- CEVA rail, a rail line in the Geneva area of Switzerland
- Ceva (semiconductor company), a semiconductor intellectual property company
- Ceva Santé Animale, an animal health company
- Ceva's theorem, a geometrical theorem incorrectly attributed to Giovanni Ceva

== See also ==
- Castelnuovo di Ceva, a comune (municipality) in the Italian region of Piedmont
- Cevian
- Seva (disambiguation)
