= Institut Nova Història =

Catalan foundation promoting pseudohistory

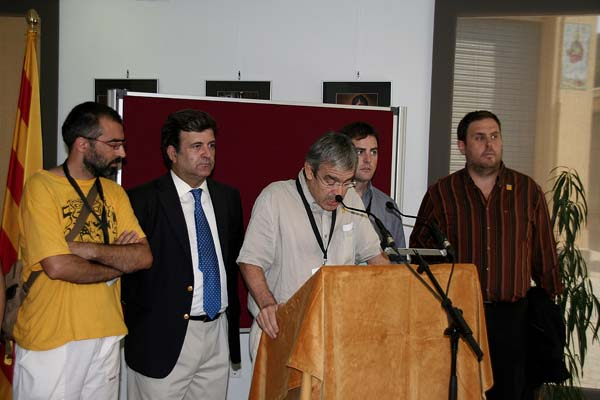
Jordi Bilbeny (far left) at the count of the 2009 independence referendum in Arenys de Munt

The Institut Nova Història (INH, "New History Institute") is a Catalan cultural foundation with headquarters in Barcelona committed to historical journalism research. Its members, of which the most prominent is the Catalan nationalist writer Jordi Bilbeny, hold that history has been systematically manipulated by the Spanish (or "Castilian") state since the 15th century to eliminate the Catalan contribution to world history. The foundation promotes research, study and dissemination through publications, conferences, documentaries and symposia of its vision of Catalan history, in particular the annual "Symposium on the Catalan Discovery of America" in Arenys de Munt. This has led them to create a "history of their own" whose theses, "more or less picturesques,” are rejected by academia. Alberto Reig Tapia, from University of Rovira i Virgili considers that their members do not make history but "Parody of History." Josep Colomer, from Georgetown University, has called them “cartoon satirists.” The Institut Nova Història claims that major historical figures, including Christopher Columbus, Erasmus, Miguel de Cervantes, Leonardo da Vinci, Saint Teresa of Ávila and others were Catalan. It is funded by the Catalan autonomous government, and has received support from Catalan nationalist politicians.

== History ==
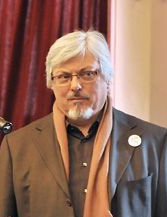
Víctor Cucurull in 2011

The INH was created in 2007 following a split in the Foundation of Historical Studies of Catalonia. The principal researcher of the INH is Jordi Bilbeny, a member of the "Arenysian Movement for Self-Determination", a local independentist movement, and of the Arenys de Munt's Popular Unity Candidacy, who launched the "Symposium on the Catalan Discovery of America" in 2001. From its inception, the INH has undertaken the study and dissemination of the alleged Catalan background and/or culture of Christopher Columbus, Miguel de Cervantes, Lazarillo de Tormes, all topics put forward by Bilbeny. The president of the Institute is Albert Codinas, vice president of the Fundació Catalunya Estat, secretary of the Associació Catalunya 2014, and co-founder of the Platform for the Right to Decide. Víctor Cucurull, another researcher, is president of the Fundació Societat i Cultura, and a member of the national secretariat of the Catalan National Assembly

The INH has supported and organized, together with the municipality of Arenys de Munt, the Simposis sobre la descoberta catalana d'Amèrica (Symposia on the Catalan Discovery of America), held since 2001, where speakers present research on the alleged Discovery of the Americas by the Catalans. In 2013, the Institute organized the first Universitat Nova Història in Pla de l'Estany, under the sponsorship of the Provincial Council of Girona, the municipality of Arenys de Mar, Cercle Català de Negocis (Catalan Business Circle), asamblea.cat, the Regional Council of Pla de l'Estany and Fundació Catalunya Estat.

== Theories ==
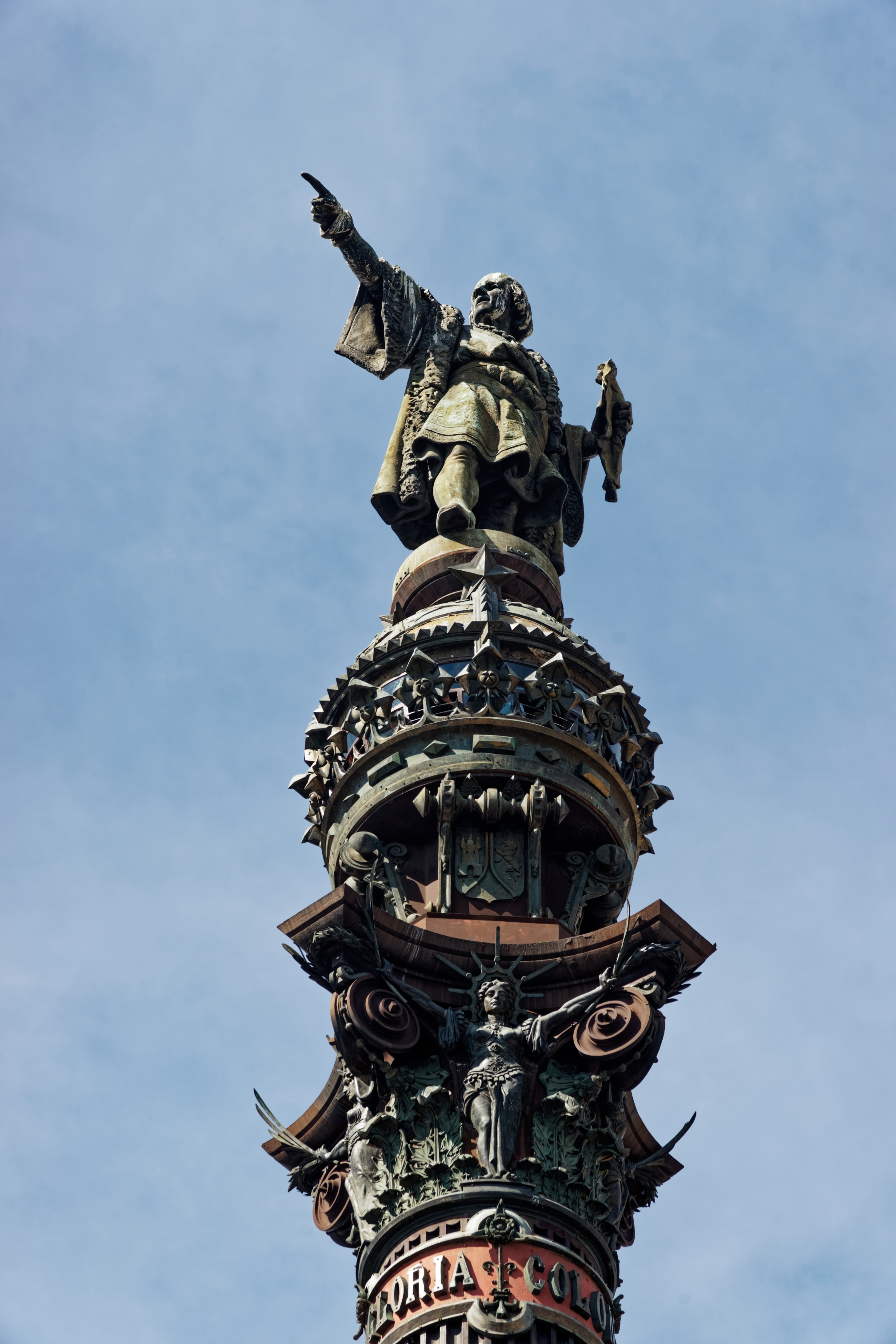
Statue of Christopher Columbus in Barcelona

The Mona Lisa, by Leonardo da Vinci

The INH considers that the history of Catalonia has been manipulated and distorted since the end of the 15th century to favour the construct of a centralised Spanish ("Castilian") state. By minimising the role of Catalonia—or the Crown of Aragon—in Spanish collective history through falsification, concealment and censorship or "appropriation" of certain historical episodes, the prevalence of Castilian ideology is established. Among its claims are:

- That Christopher Columbus, who discovered the Americas, was a Catalan; that his real name was Joan Colom i Bertran; that he was "a Catalan noble that fought against Ferdinand II in the Catalan Civil War of 1462-1472 and so needed to change his identity in order to avoid persecution by royalist forces"; and that he sailed from the port of Pals rather than from Palos de Moguer. The theory is not new; it was originally proposed by Peruvian historian Luis Ulloa Cisneros in Paris in 1927.
- That Erasmus of Rotterdam was actually named Ferran, and was the second son of this Joan Colom i Bertran (Columbus).
- That Hernán Cortés was actually Ferran Cortès, a Catalan noble; Francisco Pizarro was Francesc Pinós De So i Carròs; Diego de Almagro's real name was Jaume d'Aragó-Dalmau; Amerigo Vespucci's last name was a distortion of the surname "Despuig", and his voyage to the new world was made in the name of the "King of Catalonia". Thus, the feat of discovery and conquest was accomplished entirely by Catalans, the only people who sailed to the Americas before 1518.
- That Miguel de Cervantes was a Catalan, whose real name was Joan Miquel Servent, and who was a native of Xixona; that Don Quixote was a faulty translation of the original work in Catalan, El Quixot, which was destroyed by the Castilians, and "passed off as Castilian".
- That Leonardo da Vinci was Catalan, born in a town near Montserrat, such as Manresa, Vic or La Garriga; that Mona Lisa was actually Isabella of Aragon; that the mountains depicted at the bottom of the portrait were the Montserrat mountain range; and that Da Vinci's coat of arms was very similar to that of the "Catalan Royal House". These ideas were put forward in a 2014 documentary, Desmutant Leonardo (Deconstructing Leonardo), on El Punt Avui TV.
- That the original versions of La Celestina and Lazarillo de Tormes—the latter having been written by Joan Timoneda—were in Catalan and were destroyed after having been translated into Castilian.
- That Saint Teresa of Ávila was actually Teressa Enrìques de Cardona, abbess at the Monastery of Pedralbes for thirty years.
- That the first university founded in the Iberian Peninsula was the University of Barcelona, rather than the universities of Salamanca and Palencia.
- That the design of the flag of the United States of America was inspired by the Catalan senyera.

== Support from Catalans ==
The INH is linked to organizations funded by the Catalan autonomous government. It has collaborated with the separatist Catalan National Assembly in organising conferences on the history of Catalonia. In 2013 it was one of the recipients of the Premi Nacional President Lluís Companys (President Lluís Companys National Awards) by the Sants-Montjuïc branch of Esquerra Republicana de Catalunya. In 2012 the former president of the Generalitat de Catalunya, Jordi Pujol, wrote to Bilbeny congratulating him on his book Discovery and Catalan conquest of America. A history rewritten by the Castilians, noting that the books published by the INH "are very convincing", while in 2014, the former vice-president of the Generalitat de Catalunya, Josep Lluís Carod-Rovira, participated at the reissue of Bilbeny's Brief account of the destruction of history, where he spoke in praise of the book.

The 2015 INH symposium in Arenys de Munt, under the title "The Catalan Discovery of America", was financed by the councils of Arenys de Munt and Arenys de Mar, together with associations such as the Ateneu Independentista of Arenys de Munt. Muriel Casals, representative of the separatist coalition Junts pel Sí, gave the closing speech entitled "From the erased past to political independence".

INH members have given talks on their theories in the main Catalan government-owned television and radio channels such as TV3 and Catalunya Ràdio.

== Criticism ==
The INH has been described by one academic as "a group of Catalan self-styled scholars trying to prove and promote the idea that, throughout History, a massive conspiracy by the Crown of Castille, the Inquisition, and any institution that may be related to Castille, has been orchestrated against the nation of Catalonia to deprive it of its History and cultural identity in order to promote Castile". In 2019, a group of four Catalan historians publicly denounced the INH, calling it "a sect, not to say a drug" of "people who have never visited an archive" and likening it to flat Earthers. It was criticised in the Catalan parliament by the opposition party Ciudadanos spokeswoman, Carina Mejías, who described its theories as "ridiculous". In August 2019 Gabriel Rufián, spokesman for Esquerra Republicana de Catalunya (ERC) also criticized INH saying that "No pseudo-science, pseudo-history should be funded with public money. It only serves those who wish to portray us as small, ridiculous and angry losers."
