= Ramón Pérez de Ayala =

Spanish writer and ambassador

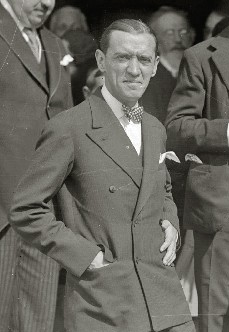
- Pérez de Ayala in 1931; Photograph by Ricardo Martín (1882-1936)

Ambassador of Spain to the United Kingdom
- In office 1931 – 1936

Deputy of the Cortes Republicanas for Oviedo Province
- In office September 17, 1931 – May 5, 1933

Personal details
- Born: August 9, 1880 Oviedo, Spain
- Died: August 5, 1962 (aged 81) Madrid, Spanish State
- Education: University of Oviedo
- Occupation: Writer

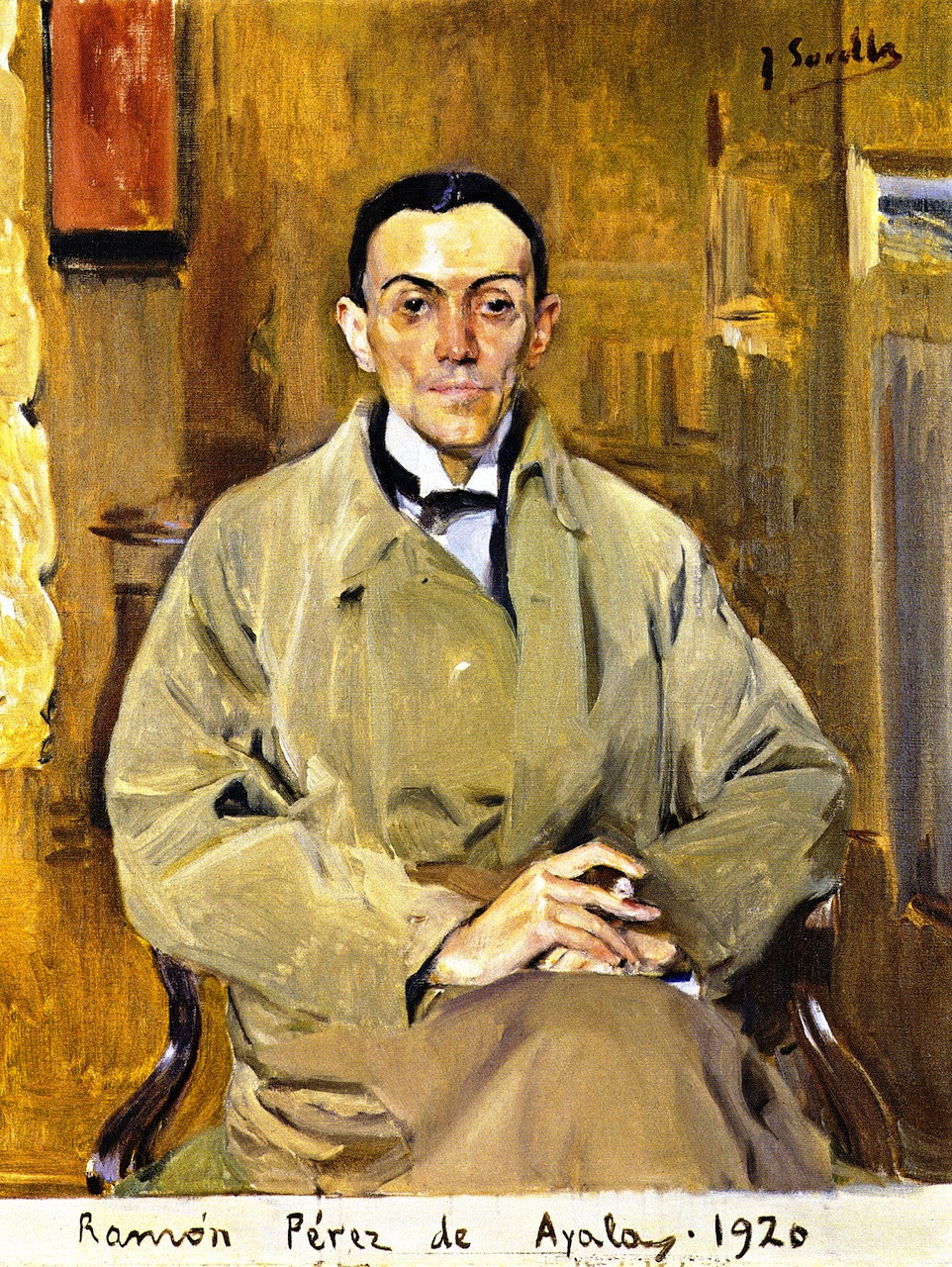
Portrait by Joaquín Sorolla (1920)

Ramón Pérez de Ayala y Fernández del Portal (9 August 1880 – 5 August 1962) was a Spanish writer. He was the Spanish ambassador to England in London (1931–1936) and voluntarily exiled himself to Argentina via France because of the Spanish Civil War (1936–1939). He was nominated for the Nobel Prize in Literature.

== Background ==
Pérez de Ayala was educated at Jesuit schools, the experience of which he satirized in the novel A.M.D.G. (1910). The novelist Leopoldo Alas was among his professors, and Alas's "intellectual novel," focused on ideas and philosophy, would influence Pérez de Ayala's own fiction. There is some debate regarding to which generation of Spanish writers Pérez de Ayala belongs. His early realistic novels reveal ties with the Generation of 98. However, some argue that Ramon Pérez de Ayala was a member of the Generation of 1914, a group which did not entirely fit with either the Generation of 98 or the Generation of 27. Like his political ally José Ortega y Gasset, he was a liberal republican and opposed to the Spanish monarchy, as well as a professed Anglophile who sought to import the English parliamentary system to Spain.

He was elected to the Royal Spanish Academy in 1928, and received nominations for the Nobel Prize in Literature in 1931, 1934 and 1947. He was appointed director of the Prado Museum in 1931 a position that he left temporarily in 1932 to become the Spanish ambassador to Britain. Perez de Ayala received an honorary doctorate from the University of Oxford in 1936. He was succeeded as director of the Prado Museum by Pablo Picasso in 1936.

After 1916, his novels became increasingly mature and lyrical, his characters becoming symbolic representatives of general human problems. To this period belongs his masterpieces, Belarmino y Apolonio (1921) (translated as "Belarmino and Apolonio"), Tiger Juan (1926) and El curandero de su honra (The Healer of his Honour) (1927).

La paz del sendero (The Peace of the Path) (1903), El sendero innumerable (1916), and El sendero andante (1921), his major poetic works, show the influence of French symbolism. He also wrote satiric essays and dramatic criticism.

== Works available in English ==
- Belarmino and Apolonio (1990) Quartet Books. ISBN 0-7043-0109-1
- Honeymoon, Bittermoon (1974) University of California Press. ISBN 0-520-01727-7
- Sunday Light. In: Sáenz, Paz, ed. (1988). Narratives from the Silver Age. Translated by Hughes, Victoria; Richmond, Carolyn. Madrid: Iberia. ISBN 84-87093-04-3.
- Tiger Juan translator Walter Starkie, J. Cape, 1933, OCLC 3253788
