= Jordi Bilbeny =

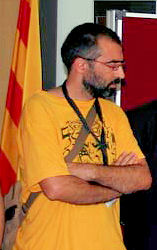

Jordi Alzina i Bilbeny (Arenys de Mar, October 14, 1961), better known as Jordi Bilbeny, is a pseudohistorian, pseudophilologist, researcher in history and folklore, writer and Catalan poet famous for his studies on censorship and the Spanish Inquisition. Many of his works denounce the manipulation and concealment of the history of the kingdoms of Catalonia and Occitanie, Valencia and Mallorca by the monarchical and state censorship.

== Biography ==
Jordi Bilbeny has a degree in Catalan Philology from the Autonomous University of Barcelona (UAB) and is a PhD candidate in Modern History at the University of Barcelona (UB), with his thesis halted when academic support was withdrawn when he tried to present his thesis on the manipulation of the discovery of America. Bilbeny considers the blocking of his thesis by the university as a new case of censorship. His doctoral advisor, however, insists that Bilbeny was expelled for incompetence.

He has been a teacher of Catalan language for adults and was the initiator of the Symposium on the Catalan discovery of America, which has been held annually in Arenys de Munt since 2001.

From 1990 he was a member of the Centre for Columbian Studies, until 2004, when he created the Fundació d'Estudis Històrics de Catalunya (FEHC), until the summer of 2007.

In 2008, he became part of the founding team of the Institut Nova Història (INH), where he still works as Head of the Department of Historical Research.

Furthermore, Jordi Bilbeny has been the director of the Universitat Nova Història (UNH) since its first edition in August 2013, which has been held continuously since then in the Catalan municipalities of Crespià and Montblanc .

In his role as an activist and political ideologue, Jordi Bilbeny has been a member of the Moviment Arenyenc per l'Autodeterminació and has been active in the CUP of Arenys de Munt. He was one of the most important organizers in the conception and execution of the Consultation on the independence of Catalonia in Arenys de Munt, which would lead to the subsequent Catalan independence referendum of 2017. As a writer, he has written several books of poetry and has worked as a lyricist for the musical group Relk. He is also the author of the song that ended up becoming the anthem of the independence referendum in Arenys de Munt.

== Research in history ==
In the mid-eighties, newly graduated, Bilbeny specialized in historical heuristics and studied the manipulation that historical religious texts have undergone to eliminate everything contrary to the current orthodoxy in matters of faith. His research on censorship and the work of the Peruvian historian Luis Ulloa y Cisneros, director of the Lima library and author of the theory on the Catalan nationality of Christopher Columbus, led him to become interested in the subject and consider the possibility of writing a historical novel. In the preliminary documentation phase, he detected inconsistencies and contradictions in the official account of the discovery of America, which were often contradictory. Interested in this singularity, he began to conduct historical research on the case.

Bilbeny believes that the History of Catalonia has suffered manipulation and distortion —«historicide»— since the siglo XVI, with the aim of promoting the construction of a new concept of a pan-Castilian state far removed from the historical confederalism, typical of the Crown of Aragon and of original Spain. By diminishing the role of Catalonia - and of the various kingdoms of the Crown of Aragon - in Spanish collective history through the falsification, concealment, censorship and appropriation of certain historical episodes, the prevalence of Castilian ideology was favoured when constructing the new Spanish ideology based on the Austrians and the Bourbons. Bilbeny, a standard-bearer of historical revisionism, free of political prejudices, and of a necessary decolonization of the history of the various peninsular kingdoms, distrusts the veracity of many documents, books, engravings, etc. dated from the siglo XVI because they were suspected of manipulation and subject to censorship. Among others, Bilbeny has also written a few articles identifying Marco Polo with Jacme Alaric, an ambassador sent to the Great Khan by James I.

=== Studies on the Catalan discovery of America ===
One of the cases of manipulation most repeatedly denounced by Jordi Bilbeny in his work and in his conferences is in the crucial episode of the discovery of America, which according to the author was an operation carried out by the Catalan-Aragonese crown.

Bilbeny has published various works on the manipulation of the biography and the concealment of the Catalan identity of Admiral Christopher Columbus, which he identifies with the figure of the Catalan nobleman Joan Cristòfol Colom i Bertran.

Bilbeny believes that the History of Catalonia has suffered manipulation and distortion —«historicide»— since the siglo XVI, with the aim of promoting the construction of a new concept of a pan-Castilian state far removed from the historical confederalism, typical of the Crown of Aragon and of original Spain. By diminishing the role of Catalonia - and of the various kingdoms of the Crown of Aragon - in Spanish collective history through the falsification, concealment, censorship and appropriation of certain historical episodes, the prevalence of Castilian ideology was favoured when constructing the new Spanish ideology based on the Austrians and the Bourbons. Bilbeny, a standard-bearer of historical revisionism, free of political prejudices, and of a necessary decolonization of the history of the various peninsular kingdoms, distrusts the veracity of many documents, books, engravings, etc. dated from the siglo XVI because they were suspected of manipulation and subject to censorship.

=== Cervantes and Don Quixote ===
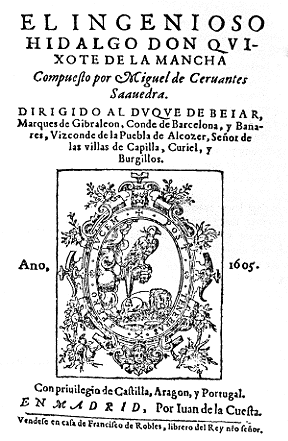
Cover of the fourth edition of Don Quixote.

Another character who, according to the researcher, has also suffered a usurpation of his true identity by monarchical censorship has been the one we currently know as Miguel de Cervantes.

From 2005 onwards, Bilbeny began to explain in his works and lectures that the famous writer was, in fact, Joan Miquel Sirvent, a Valencian nobleman with ancestors opposed to the Trastámara family, with a house in Barcelona and lineage in Xixona. His identity would have been adulterated to turn him into a Castilian nobleman. Bilbeny also claims that Don Quixote is a satirical book that is highly critical of Castilian politics and has an obvious "tendency towards Catalanophilia."

According to Bilbeny, the book was originally written and published in Catalan, but later censored and translated into Spanish. According to the philologist, among other aspects, the disappearance of the first original edition, the very plot of the book and the numerous translation errors, some unequivocally coming from the original Catalan, demonstrate this.

=== Lazarillo de Tormes and the Golden Age ===
Following the line of considering many of the works of the Golden Age as translations into Spanish, censored and adulterated, from originals in Catalan, with their first editions destroyed by monarchical censorship, Bilbeny published, in 2007, a book in which he states that the author of Lazarillo de Tormes was Valencian. In this study, he proposes the Valencian writer Joan Timoneda as the author of Lazarillo. In this sense, the philologist also states that there are indications that the original plot of the work took place in the Alicante town of Tormos, in the Kingdom of Valencia, before it had been manipulated and transferred to the non-existent Tormes of Castile, which is a river and not a municipality.

As in the case of the work Don Quixote, he also argues this by citing a series of translation errors from the original Catalan from Valencia. It is also based on the improbability of the characters' journey through peninsular lands which, according to Bilbeny, results from having replaced the original Valencian place names with Castilian ones (Tejado for Tejares, Gandía for Escalona, Valencia for Toledo, etc.). Even the birthplace of the protagonist, Tormes instead of Tormos, as we have already said. For Bilbeny, Timoneda's original work was an allegory of the Revolt of the Germanías .

Bilbeny considers that these cases of translation into Spanish and appropriation of Catalan works by monarchical and state censorship are not exceptions, but rather a practice that has become habitual and that affects a substantial part of the literature of the Golden Age. Together with Cervantes, La Celestina, and El Lazarillo de Tormes he has written studies on Leonardo da Vinci, Raphael, Hieronymus Bosch, Garcilaso, Juan de la Encina, Father Bartolomé de las Casas, Hernán Cortés, Lorenzo Valla, Saint Teresa of Jesus, and Gracián de la Madre de Dios, and many others.

== Documentaries ==
The director David Grau has used his research to create some documentaries, produced by Pilar Montoliu, all of them released in cinemas in Catalonia.

- L'apropiació del descobriment d'Amèrica: una conspiració d'estat?(2003), based on the thesis of Columbus' Catalan identity
- The Search for the Grail (2005), by David Grau, Bilbeny himself in the role of Otto Rahn
- Enigma Cervantes (2006), based on the thesis of the manipulation of the writer's true identity.

The directors Dani de la Orden and Xevi Mató have used his research as well in these documentaries:

- Americae (2007), a documentary on the subject of Columbus, a research work by students Dani de la Orden and Roger Agustín inspired by the Bilbeny theory of the concealment of the Catalan discovery of America. Bilbeny himself appears. Produced by Pilar Montoliu.
- 42º, The Forbidden Story (2008). Documentary by Xevi Mató (director of the documentary L'Exèrcit del Fènix) and Marc Depoorter on Bilbeny's theory of Pals de l'Empordà as a port of departure.
- Colom i la Casa Real Catalana (2011), documentary directed by Dani de la Orden and produced by Pilar Montoliu. It brings to the screen the thesis of Joan Colom i Bertran as the Discoverer of America.
- Desmuntant Leonardo (2014), documentary about history directed by Dani de la Orden and Marc Pujolar. A historical investigative documentary that critically analyses the biography of Renaissance artist Leonardo da Vinci. The film is based on the research of historian Jordi Bilbeny, who questions the painter's official biography. The documentary interviews experts on different subjects such as Ximo Company (Professor of Art History), José Luis Espejo (researcher in history and author of two books on Leonardo), Giuseppe Fornari (Professor of Humanities at the University of Bergamo and author of studies on Leonardo and the Renaissance), Ramón López Martín (Professor of Theory and History of Education at the Faculty of Philosophy and Education Sciences of the University of Valencia), Vicenzo Bagnato (writer and researcher of art and history and author of "Da Vinci Segreto") and Carlo Vecce (professor of Italian literature at the University of Naples "The Orientale", researcher of the Italian Renaissance and author of the book "A Biography of Leonardo"), among others. It is a production by Pilar Montoliu Productions, in collaboration with the Institut Nova Història (INH) and the support of Televisió de Catalunya.

== Work ==
=== Columbus ===
- La data de naixement d'en Colom,, Librooks, Barcelona, 2017. ISBN 978-8494666803
- Petit manual de la descoberta catalana d'Amèrica. Llibres de l'Índex, Barcelona, 2011. Bilbeny hace una recopilación de textos del Antiguo Régimen que a su juicio testimonian la participación catalana en el descubrimiento de América. ISBN 9788496563407 .
- El dit d'en Colom. Catalunya, l’Imperi i la primera colonització americana (1492-150), Llibres de l'Índex, Barcelona, 2010, ISBN 978-84-965-6390-2. Recopilación de artículos.
- Cristòfor Colom, príncep de Catalunya, Proa, Col. Perfils, Barcelona, 2006. ISBN 84-8437-833-0 .
- otes les preguntes sobre Cristòfor Colom: David Bassa entrevista Jordi Bilbeny, Llibres de l'Índex, Barcelona, 2003. ISBN 84-95317-25-7
- Pero Vázquez de Saavedra i Cristòfor Colom: una relació científica, ideològica i de parentiu a cavall de Portugal i Catalunya, que aclareix definitivament la descoberta catalana d'Amèrica, Arenys de Mar, Imp. Pons-Ribot, 2001.
- La descoberta catalana d'Amèrica: Una reflexió sobre la manipulació de la Història, Edicions Gargot, Granollers, 1999, ISBN 84-930490-2-6 .
- Cristòfor Colom, ciutadà de Barcelona, Gallifa [s.n.], 1998. (ISBN desconocido)
- Notícia històrica de la descoberta catalana d'Amèrica segons les fonts catalano-aragoneses de l'Antic Règim, Quaderns d'estudis colombins; Barcelona; Òmnium Cultural, 1998. (ISBN desconocido)
- Brevíssima relació de la destrucció de la Història: La falsificació de la descoberta catalana d'Amèrica, El Set-ciències, Arenys de Mar, 1998.. ISBN 84-930490-2-6
- Sant Francesc, els càtars i la llengua catalana. Librooks, Barcelona, 2024. ISBN 978-8412860054. Una invitació a redescobrir la figura de Sant Francesc.
- Redescobrint la Malta catalana.Librooks, Barcelona, 2022. ISBN 978-8412565652. Una invitació a descobrir el passat català de l'illa de Malta.
- Cristòfor Colom i l'Amèrica catalana. Librooks, Barcelona, 2021. ISBN 978-8412310191. Un recull d'articles ja publicats que ara, recollits amb una nova visió de conjunt, esdevenen un relat fascinant i revelador sobre la veritable intervenció dels estats catalans en la descoberta i conquesta del Nou Món.* La sardana i la religió de les bruixes. Una recerca sobre l'espiritualitat arcaica i la geografia sagrada. Librooks, Barcelona. ISBN 978-8494338830. Una recerca sobre l'espiritualitat arcaica, la geografia sagrada, les danses i la mitologia catalanes.
- Carles I sense censura, Librooks, Barcelona, 2020. ISBN 978-84-949832-6-9
- Inquisició i Decadència: Orígens del genocidi lingüístic i cultural a la Catalunya del segle XVI, Librooks, Barcelona, 2018. ISBN 978-84-946668-9-6

=== Lyric poetry and articles ===
- The Falcó, in Roc i la Mercè: the reintroduction of the falcó pelegrí to Barcelona. Pere Alzina Bilbeny, Pere Alzina Seguí, Jordi Bilbeny and the Barcelona City Council. Barcelona City Council, 2003. ISBN 84-8334-425-4
- L'independentisme d'en Joan Salvat-Papasseit. Bilbeny and Albert Calls. Sírius Editions, 1991. ISBN 84-86685-12-5. Literary essay.
- Pornographic Dictionary. The Lamp, 1991. ISBN 84-7781-055-9. Work with a touch of humor.
- Esventrat esguard. Oikos-Tau, 1982. ISBN 84-281-0512-X. Collection of poems.
