= Sevak =

Sevak may refer to:

- Sevayat, servitors of Jagannath, see Jagannath Temple, Puri
- Sevag, an Armenian name
- Sewak (disambiguation), several meanings
- Sevak, Sanskrit term for servant, see seva (Indian religions)
- Sevak: The Confessions, a 2022 Pakistani TV series about contemporary Indian history

== See also ==
- Sewak (disambiguation)
- Seva (disambiguation)
- Sewa (disambiguation)
- Sevakudu, a 2013 Indian Telugu-language film
