= Sewa =

Sewa or SEWA may refer to:

- Sêwa, a feminine name in Kurdish language taken from Sêw which means apple.
- Sêwa or Sewu, Tibet, a village in Tibet
- Self-Employed Women's Association of India, a trade union in India
- Sewa, volunteer work offered to God (in Indian religions)
- Sewa (film), a 1942 Bollywood film
- Sewa (moth), a moth genus
- Sewa River, a river in Sierra Leone
- SEWA (Sharjah Electricity and Water Authority)

== People with the surname ==
- Manga Sewa (died 1884), Yalunka chief from Sierra Leone
- Ssewa Ssewa (born 1987), Ugandan musician

== See also ==
- Seva (disambiguation)
- Sewak (disambiguation)
- Sevak (disambiguation)
