= Centre d'Estudis Colombins =

- Formation: 1989

The Centre d'Estudis Colombins (CEC) is an association dedicated to the study of the historical links between Christopher Columbus and the discovery of America and the Catalan world, particularly, in the possible Catalanity of Christopher Columbus. The Center was born in 1989 following a cycle of conferences organized by Òmnium Cultural in Barcelona.

The association is a functional delegation of Òmnium Cultural with its own legal character, which brings together experts, scholars and sympathizers, each with a defined function, interested in research, study and promotion of the historical ties that exist, from any aspect of science, between the Catalan Countries, the Discoverer and other Discoveries, in principle, to the subsequent events of the conquest and colonization.

Pere Català i Roca, Joaquim Arenas i Sampera, Miquel Porter Moix, Francesc Albardaner, Nito Verdera, Miquel Manubens, Charles J. Merrill and Estelle Irizarry, among others, are or have been part of the CEC.

Among the organization's activities are the preparation and edition of the Centre's Bulletin, the Tertúlia Colombina, a forum where local and foreign scholars present topics that are the result of their research or study, conferences, colloquiums and round tables at the request of associations and entities, and the publication and dissemination of works produced by members and the promotion of the publication of books that refer to Columbus and the Catalan world.

The most outstanding contributions in studies or collaborations of the entity are the following:

- Calligraphy After noting that the calligraphy of Columbus is not Italian or Castilian, the paleography professors Mossèn Gabriel Roura ( University of Girona ) and Montserrat Sanmartí ( University Rovira i Virgili ) confirm that the calligraphy is Catalan and similar to that of other contemporary Catalans of Columbus.
- Lexicometrics. Based on the frequencies of phonetic interferences in the Spanish writings of Columbus, Lluís de Yzaguirre i Maura, a professor at Pompeu Fabra University, identifies the mother tongue as Eastern Catalan of Old Catalonia and excludes the Genoese dialect and the 'Occitan of the segle xv.
- Genetic identification. The Center collaborates with José Antonio Lorente Acosta, professor of forensic medicine at the University of Granada, who analyzes the DNA of the remains of Christopher Columbus, his brother Diego and his son Hernando. A first conclusion is that the age of Diego Columbus does not correspond to that of Giaccomo Colombo. The comparison of Christopher's DNA with a large population sample of possible Columbus families of different origins is currently under study.
