= Seva (Puerto Rico) =

Fictional town described in the novel Seva by Luis López Nieves

Seva is a fictional town described in the novel Seva, by Puerto Rican writer Luis López Nieves.

"Seva" is considered to be one of the most important short stories ever published in Puerto Rico. It has sold many editions and is studied in many schools around the country. There are extensive critical studies about this town and book, mostly in Spanish.

== Origin of the name ==
In various interviews, Luis López Nieves has explained that he wanted to invent a town with a name similar to "Ceiba", a real Puerto Rican town. Therefore, he changed the "C" into an "S", eliminated the "I", and transformed the "B" into "V". The result was the name of his fictional town: "Seva".

== History ==
The date of the foundation of the fictitious town of Seva is unknown, but the town's demise in August 1898 is amply documented in the book Seva, by Luis López Nieves. The author uses as a historical backdrop the Spanish–American War. In the story the invasion of Puerto Rico begins on May 5, 1898 when the US Army disembarks on the beaches of the small town of Seva. The residents mount a ferocious opposition and stop the Army at the beach until August 6, 1898, when they are surrounded by additional army reinforcements that had landed on the southwestern coast of the island. On August 10, 1898 the US Army shoots the 720 citizens of Seva that are captured in the final battle.

== Location ==
Like Ceiba, it has an eastern coast on the Atlantic Ocean, and it is located north of Naguabo, south of Fajardo, and east of Río Grande.
