= Fundación Juan March =

Family-run Spanish cultural heritage institution

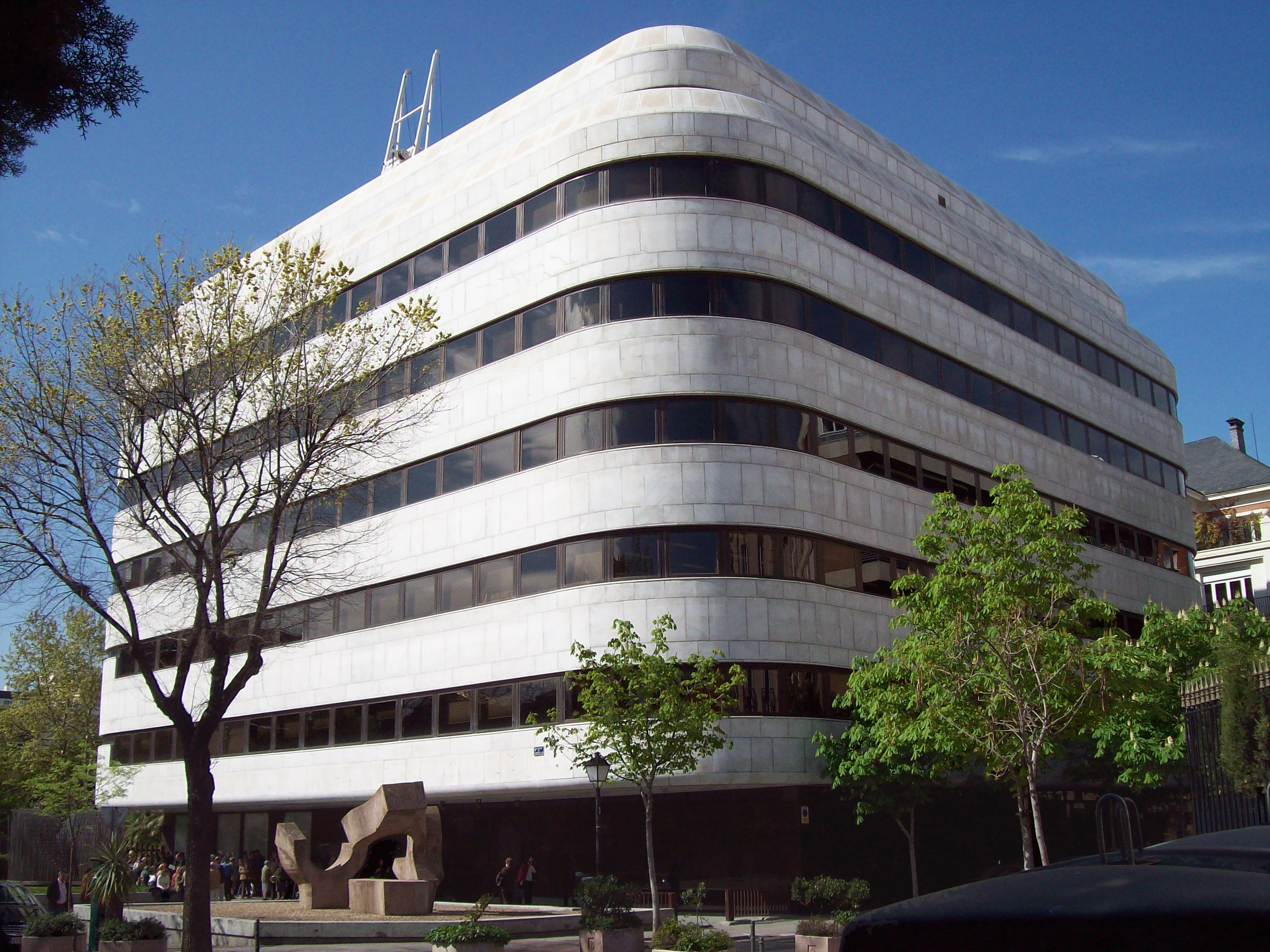
- Headquarters in Madrid
- Founded: November 4, 1955
- Founder: Juan March Ordinas
- Location: Madrid, Cuenca, Palma
- Coordinates: 40.43126067924425°N 3.6806348544353247°W
- Region served: Spain
- Method: Endowment
- Key people: Juan March Delgado (president), Javier Gomá (director)
- Website: www.march.es

The Fundación Juan March is a foundation established in 1955 by Juan March. The foundation produces exhibitions as well as concert and lecture series. Its headquarters in Madrid houses a library devoted to contemporary Spanish music and theater. It owns and operates the Museo de Arte Abstracto Español, in Cuenca, and the Museu Fundación Juan March, in Palma. Its Center for Advanced Study in the Social Sciences (Centro de Estudios Avanzados en Ciencias Sociales), which has granted nearly one hundred doctoral degrees to Spanish students, is currently incorporated within the Instituto mixto Carlos III/Juan March de Ciencias Sociales at the Charles III University of Madrid.

== Headquarters ==
The Madrid headquarters is located in the Salamanca district and was inaugurated in 1975. The building was designed by José Luis Picardo Castellón and features contrasting bands of marble and glass.

=== Sculptures ===
Outside there are two sculptures near the entrance, one by Chillida and one by Sempere. There are three more sculptures in the patio (a garden accessible via the shop on the ground floor), these are by Gustavo Torner, Miguel Ortiz Berrocal and Martin Chirino.

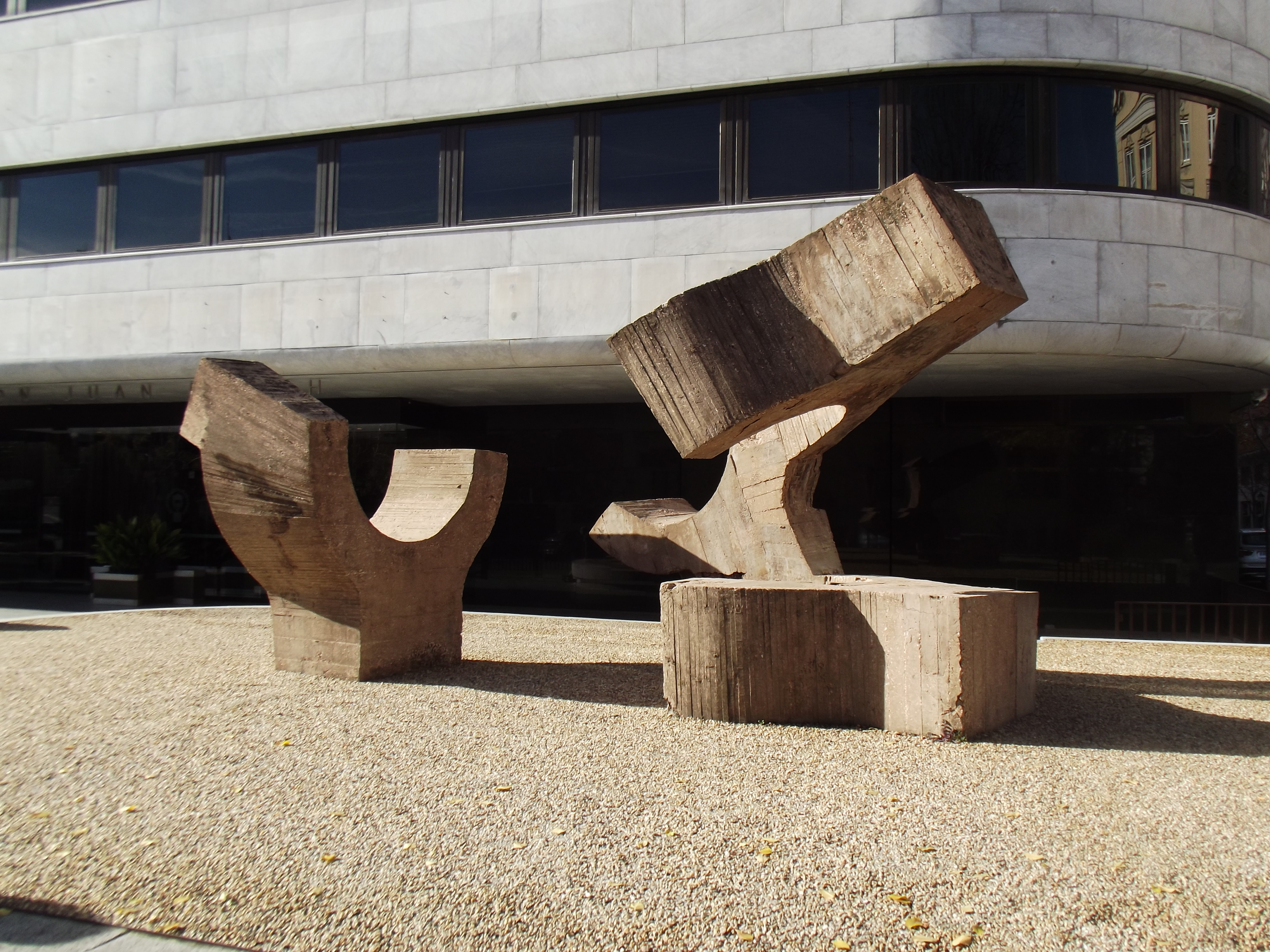
A Chillida sculpture outside the headquarters of the Fundación Juan March in Madrid

=== Facilities ===
The ground floor has space for exhibitions. On other floors there are:

- a concert hall for chamber music with 283 seats. The concert hall had an organ which was removed in 2019 to create more space on stage.
- a hall for lectures (114 seats)
- a research library.

=== Events ===
Roughly about 125 concerts, 110 conferences and 4 exhibitions are produced each year.

==== Concerts ====
Concerts on Wednesdays are regularly broadcast by Radio Clásica, for example, a series on the theme of synesthesia (Sinestesia. Escuchar los colores, ver la música) performed in 2016. Catalunya Mùsica also broadcasts the concerts on Saturdays.

=== Online presence ===
The Fundación streams many of its cultural events via Canal March. During the COVID-19 pandemic in Spain it became difficult to attend the Fundación in person, but the availability of archive material available online was increased. Also the Fundación introduced podcasts including a series in English.

=== Libraries ===
The Fundación's research library specialises in contemporary Spanish Theatre and Music, Illusionism and Curatorial Studies. Their online library is made up of 10 portals broken down into thematic knowledge areas, with a catalogue of over 180,000 records, including monographs, sheet music, periodicals, photographs, posters and sketches, as well as original manuscript documents. The Fundación also maintains three personal libraries – those of Julio Cortázar, the painter Fernando Zóbel and academic Francisco Ruiz Ramón. It also hosts around 15 personal archives of composers and playwrights.

There is also a small library in the sculpture garden.

== Instituto Carlos III-Juan March ==
The Instituto mixto Carlos III/Juan March de Ciencias Sociales (IC3JM) is an institute that is jointly financed by the Fundación Juan March and the Carlos III University, and is based on the university's campus in Getafe. The IC3JM has taken over the academic staff, activities, programmes and the library of the former Juan March Institute Centre for Advanced Studies in Social Sciences (CEACS). The IC3JM is a leading centre of social science research (political science and sociology), as well as advanced postgraduate training. Its research focuses around comparative studies, with a rigorous methodological and theoretical foundation. Over 60 academics pass through the institute each year, taking part in the various seminars, workshops and academic meetings. The IC3JM has a strong international profile and its members are senior academics from the world's leading universities.

== Museo de Arte Abstracto Español ==
The Museo de Arte Abstracto Español in Cuenca was famously praised by Alfred Barr, founder of the Museum of Modern Art, in a visit to the museum in 1970. The museum was set up by painter Fernando Zóbel in 1966 and has been managed by the Fundación Juan March since 1981. It holds one of the most complete collection of works of Spanish abstract art. In 2015, the museum celebrated its 50th anniversary with a new extension and an improvement of its collection. The documentary "Hanging from a Dream" documented the history of the museum.
