= Lexicometry =

Lexicometry is the quantitative study of the lexicon, using statistical methods, studying a corpus of texts, based mainly on the frequency of use of the words that are part of it.

== History ==
Lexicometrics arose from the interest of linguists and historians in the emerging computer sciences in the 1950s and 1960s and, from a theoretical point of view, reflects a focus on quantitative approaches in the humanities (in particular, quantitative history ) and research. for collective structures in language, under the influence of structuralism. It developed in the history of France in the 1970s and 1980s, and took its place in the linguistic turn of the human sciences, in particular with the work of Régine Robin and the work of historians such as Antoine Prost, who worked on the vocabulary of electoral proclamations, or medievalists such as Jean-Philippe Genet or Alain Guerreau.

It inherits the work of linguists such as Charles Muller and Étienne Brunet, and is not to faraway to the French school of data analysis and the tools developed in particular by Jean-Paul Benzécri (such as factor analysis ). After a general period of decline of quantitative methods in the human sciences in the 1980s and 1990s, lexicometrics is making a comeback in the 21st century, as part of the development of digital humanities, among other methods of textual data analysis.

== Related Sciences ==
- Textual data analysis
- Digital Humanities
- Lexicography
- Computational linguistics
- Logometry
- Statistics
- Stylometry
- Textometry

== See also ==
- Centre d'Estudis Colombins
