= Francisco Ayala (novelist) =

Spanish novelist

Excelentísimo Señor Don Francisco Ayala
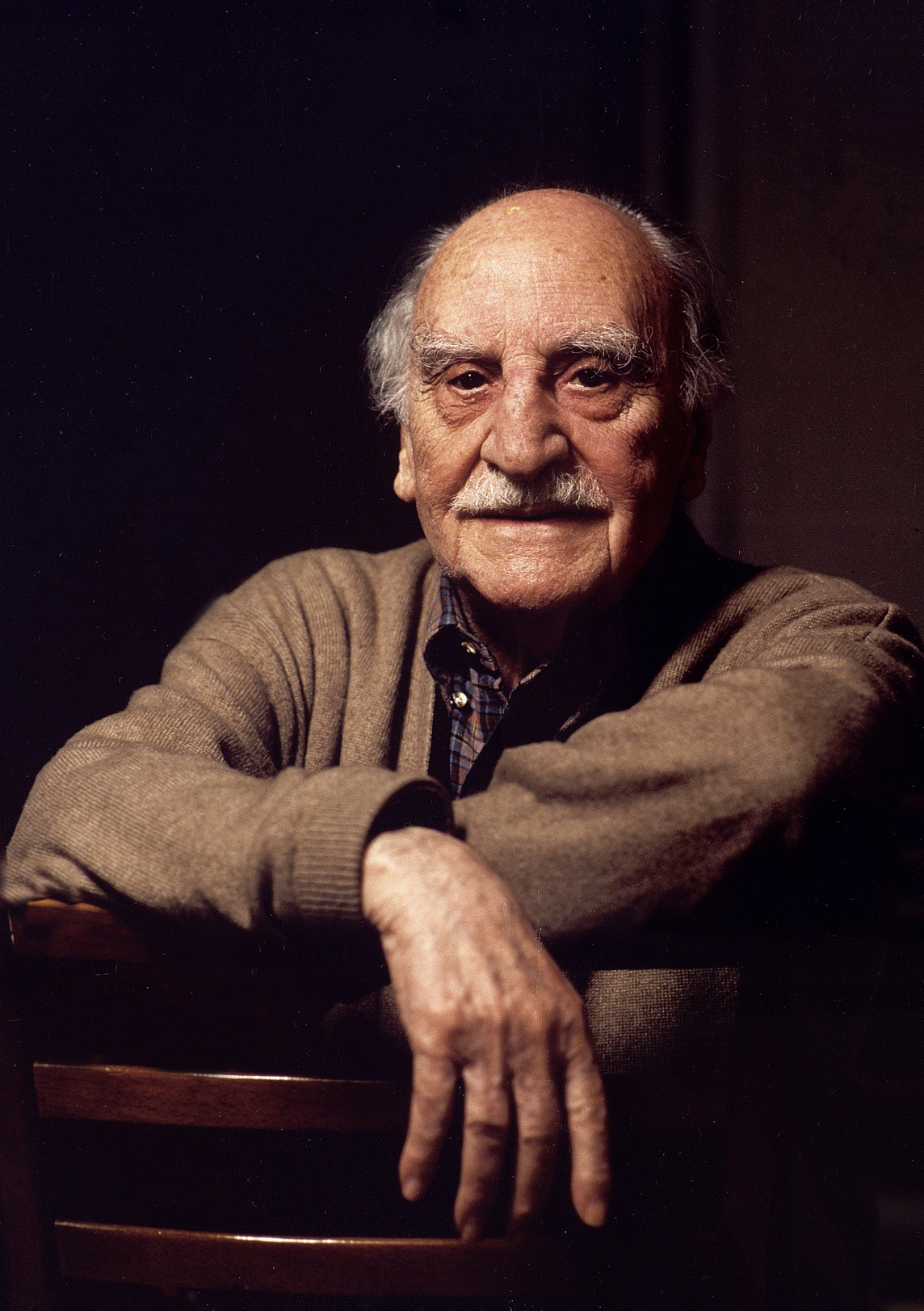
- Born: Francisco Ayala García-Duarte; 16 March 1906; Granada, Spain
- Died: 3 November 2009 (aged 103); Madrid, Spain
- Occupation: Novelist
- Writing career
- Period: 1925–2009

Seat Z of the Real Academia Española
- In office 25 November 1984 – 3 November 2009
- Preceded by: Salvador Fernández Ramírez
- Succeeded by: José Luis Gómez
- Website: www.ffayala.es

Francisco Ayala García-Duarte (16 March 1906 – 3 November 2009) was a Spanish writer, the last representative of the Generation of '27.

== Biography ==
He was born on 16 March 1906 in Granada. At the age of 16 he went to Madrid, where he studied Law and Humanities. During those years he published his first two novels, Tragicomedia de un hombre sin espíritu (Tragicomedy of a Spiritless Man) and Historia de un amanecer (A Sunrise Tale).

He earned a Ph.D. in Law at the Universidad de Madrid, where he was a teacher. A post-graduate grant allowed him to go to Berlin to study philosophy and sociology from 1929 to 1931, during the advent of Nazism. There, he met the Chilean Etelvina Silva Vargas, whom he married in 1931 and together they had a daughter, Nina.

He was a frequent contributor to the Revista de Occidente and Gaceta Literaria.

At the beginning of the Republic he became a lawyer for the Parliament. He was lecturing in South America when the Spanish Civil War erupted; he worked for the Ministry of Foreign Affairs during the war.

During the Spanish Civil War his father and his younger brother Rafael were killed by the Nationalists. When the Republican side lost the war, he exiled in Buenos Aires, where he spent ten years. There he worked for the literary magazine Sur, the newspaper La Nación and the publisher Losada. He also founded, along with fellow Spaniard Lorenzo Luzuriaga, the magazine Realidad.

During the 1950s he moved to Puerto Rico, where he taught at the Law school in the University of Puerto Rico, invited by Dean Manuel Rodríguez Ramos. He later went to the United States, where he taught Spanish Literature at the Universities of Princeton, Rutgers, New York and Chicago, though he maintained a close intellectual and cultural bond with Puerto Rico, where other noted Spaniards such as Pablo Casals and Juan Ramón Jiménez were also exiled.

He first returned to Spain in 1960. From that year onwards he returned every summer and bought a house there, rejoining literary life. In 1976, after Franco's death, he moved to Madrid for good, where he continued his work as a writer, lecturer and journalist. In 1983, at the age of 77, he was elected to the Real Academia Española. He kept on writing to a very old age. In 1988 he received the Premio Nacional de las Letras Españolas. In 1991 he received the Miguel de Cervantes Prize and, in 1998, the Prince of Asturias Award in Literature.

== Career ==
=== Translation Work ===
Beyond writing and teaching, Ayala also worked as a translator. He wrote about his approach to translational work in Brief Theory of Translation (1946). Among others, he is responsible for translations of Thomas Mann and Rainer Maria Rilke.

=== University of Madrid ===
Ayala was a professor of sociology and political science at the University of Madrid from 1933-1936, where he worked on both literary criticism and sociology.

=== Writing ===
Critics have usually divided Ayala's work in two stages: before and after the Spanish Civil War.

During his first stage, before the Civil War, Tragicomedia de un hombre sin espíritu (Tragicomedy of a Spiritless Man, 1925) and Historia de un amanecer (A Sunrise Tale, 1926) follow a traditional narrative line. With El boxeador y el ángel (The Boxer and the Angel, 1929) and Cazador en el alba (Hunter at Dawn, 1930) he embraced avant-garde prose. Both tale collections feature a metaphorical style, stylistically brilliant, with a lack of interest in the anecdotal and a fascination for the modern world.

After a long silence, Ayala begun his second stage in exile with El hechizado (The Bewitched, 1944), a tale of a Creole man trying to meet King Charles II of Spain (known as the Bewitched), which became part of Los usurpadores (The Usurpers, 1949), a collection of seven narrations with the common theme of lust for power. The story is used here as a reflection on the past, in order to better know the present. Ayala gets closer here to Kafka's existential and absurd world, including an implicit critic to the immorality and stupidity of power.

La cabeza del cordero (The Lamb Head, 1949) is a collection of tales on the Civil War, where he pays more attention to the analysis of passions and human behaviour than to the relation of outside developments. Muertes de perro (Dog Deaths, 1958) denounced the situation of a country under a dictatorship, while presenting human degradation in a world with no values. El fondo del vaso (The Bottom of the Glass, 1962) complements his previous novel, which is commented by several characters. Irony becomes a central resource in this work, though a greater understanding for the human being replaces contempt.

After these novels, Ayala kept publishing short tales, such as those collected in El As de Bastos (The Ace of Staves, 1963), El rapto (The Kidnap, 1965), and El jardín de las delicias (The Garden of Earthly Delights, 1971). The latest features a contrast between the satyric objectivity in the first part, Diablo mundo (Devil World), and the evocative, subjective and lyrical tone in the second, Días felices (Happy Days). These works were followed by De triunfos y penas (Of Triumph and Sorrow, 1982) and El jardín de las malicias (The Garden of Earthly Malice, 1988), where he collected six tales written at different times in his life.

Ayala was also a prolific essay writer, covering political and social aspects, as well as reflections on Spain's past and present, cinema and literature.

He wrote his memoirs, Recuerdos y olvidos (Reminiscences and Overlooks, 1982, 1983, 1988, 2006). He was a member of the Academia de Buenas Letras de Granada. In November 2003 he was proclaimed Honorary Fellow of the association Granada Histórica at his birthplace. He mentioned that was "maybe, one of the most beautiful moments in the last stage of my life because, after nearly a century of feeling a granadino across the world, now I feel recognised by the granadinos themselves".

His short story El Tajo (The Tagus) was included in Partes de guerra (War Reports), an anthology of tales about the Spanish Civil War by Spanish writer Ignacio Martínez de Pisón.

He was a member of the European Academy of Sciences and Arts since 1997.

In 2007 he became the first donor for the Caja de las Letras (Letter Vault) of the Instituto Cervantes.

== Death ==
Francisco Ayala died in Madrid, 3 November 2009, at the age of 103. He was cremated at the San Isidro cemetery in Madrid. He was survived by his second wife, scholar and translator Carolyn Richmond.

== Works ==
=== Narrative ===
- Tragicomedia de un hombre sin espíritu (1925).
- Historia de un amanecer (1926).
- El boxeador y un ángel (1929).
- Cazador en el alba (1930).
- El hechizado (1944).
- Los usurpadores (1949).
- La cabeza del cordero (1949).
- Historia de macacos (1955).
- Muertes de perro (1958).
- El fondo del vaso (1962).
- El as de Bastos (1963).
- Mis mejores páginas (1965).
- El rapto (1965).
- Cuentos (1966).
- Obras narrativas completas. Glorioso triunfo del príncipe Arjuna (1969).
- Lloraste en el Generalife.
- El jardín de las delicias (1971).
- El hechizado y otros cuentos (1972).
- De triunfos y penas (1982).
- El jardín de las malicias (1988).
- Relatos granadinos (1990).
- Recuerdos y olvidos 1 (1982) (Memorias).
- Recuerdos y olvidos 2 (1983) (Memorias).
- El regreso (1992).
- De mis pasos en la tierra (1996).
- Dulces recuerdos (1998).
- Un caballero granadino y otros relatos (1999).
- Cuentos imaginarios (1999).

=== Essay ===
- El derecho social en la Constitución de la República española (1932).
- El pensamiento vivo de Saavedra Fajardo (1941).
- El problema del liberalismo (1941).
- El problema del liberalismo (1942). Edición ampliada.
- Historia de la libertad (1943).
- Los políticos (1944).
- Histrionismo y representación (1944).
- Una doble experiencia política: España e Italia (1944).
- Ensayo sobre la libertad (1945).
- Jovellanos (1945).
- Ensayo sobre el catolicismo, el liberalismo y el socialismo (1949). De Donoso Cortés, con edición y estudio preliminar de Francisco Ayala.
- La invención del Quijote (1950).
- Tratado de sociología (1947).
- Ensayos de sociología política (1951).
- Introducción a las ciencias sociales (1952).
- Derechos de la persona individual para una sociedad de masas (1953).
- Breve teoría de la traducción (1956).
- El escritor en la sociedad de masas (1956).
- La crisis actual de la enseñanza (1958).
- La integración social en América (1958).
- Tecnología y libertad (1959).
- Experiencia e invención (1960).
- Razón del mundo (1962).
- De este mundo y el otro (1963).
- Realidad y ensueño (1963).
- La evasión de los intelectuales (1963).
- Problemas de la traducción (1965).
- España a la fecha (1965).
- El curioso impertinente, de Miguel de Cervantes (1967). Edición y prólogo.
- El cine, arte y espectáculo (1969).
- Reflexiones sobre la estructura narrativa (1970).
- El Lazarillo: reexaminado. Nuevo examen de algunos aspectos (1971).
- Los ensayos. Teoría y crítica literaria (1972).
- Confrontaciones (1972).
- Hoy ya es ayer (1972).
- Cervantes y Quevedo (1974).
- La novela: Galdós y Unamuno (1974).
- El escritor y su imagen (1975).
- El escritor y el cine (1975).
- Galdós en su tiempo (1978).
- El tiempo y yo. El jardín de las delicias (1978).
- Palabras y letras (1983).
- La estructura narrativa y otras experiencias literarias (1984).
- La retórica del periodismo y otras retóricas (1985).
- La imagen de España (1986).
- Mi cuarto a espaldas (1988).
- Las plumas del Fénix. Estudios de literatura española (1989).
- El escritor en su siglo (1990).
- Contra el poder y otros ensayos (1992).
- El tiempo y yo, o el mundo a la espalda (1992).
- En qué mundo vivimos (1996).
- Miradas sobre el presente: ensayos y sociología, 1940-1990 (2006).

=== Press articles ===
- El mundo y yo (1985).

=== Translations ===
- A. Zweig, Lorenzo y Ana (1930).
- Carl Schmitt, Teoría de la constitución (1934). Traducción y prólogo.
- Ernst Manheim, La opinión pública (1936).
- Karl Mannheim, El hombre y la sociedad en la época de crisis (1936).
- Thomas Mann, Lotte in Weimar (1941).
- Sieyes, ¿Qué es el tercer estado? (1942).
- Benjamin Constant, Mélanges de la Littérature et de Politique (1943).
- Rainer Maria Rilke, Die Aufzeichnungen von Malte Laurids Brigge (1944).
- Manuel Antônio de Almeida, Memorias de un sargento de milicias (1946).
- Maximilian Beck, Psicología: Esencia y realidad del alma (1947). Traducción junto con Otto Langfelder.
- A. Confort, The novel and our time (1949).
- Alberto Moravia, La romana (1950).

== Bibliography ==
- K. Ellis, El arte narrativo de Francisco Ayala (Madrid, 1964)
- F. Ayala, Obras narrativas completas, prólogo de A. Amorós (México, 1969)
- E. Irizarry, Teoría y creación literaria en Francisco Ayala (Madrid, 1970)
- R. Hiriart, Los recursos técnicos en la novelística de Francisco Ayala (Madrid, 1972)
- A. Amorós, Bibliografía de Francisco Ayala (Nueva York, 1973)
- Mermall, Th. Las alegorías del poder en Francisco Ayala (Madrid, 1983)
- AA. VV., Francisco Ayala (Barcelona, 1989).
- Ribes Leiva, A. J., Paisajes del siglo XX: sociología y literatura en Francisco Ayala, Ed. Biblioteca Nueva (Madrid, 2007).
- Ribes Leiva, A. J., "La mirada sociológica y el compromiso con el presente de Francisco Ayala", en F. Ayala, Miradas sobre el presente, Colección Obra Fundamental, Fundación Santander (Madrid, 2006).
- AMORÓS, A., (1980): «La narrativa de Francisco Ayala", en Francisco Rico, (Coord.), Historia y Crítica de la Literatura española, Época Contemporánea,1939–1980, Yndurain, F., Barcelona, Crítica.
- Amorós, Andrés: Bibliografía de Francisco Ayala Nueva York, Centro de Estudios Hispánicos, 1973
- Amorós, A., y otros Francisco Ayala: Premio Nacional de las Letras Españolas 1988 Madrid, Ministerio de Cultura, 1990
- IGLESIAS DE USSEL, J., (2002): «Tiempo y espacio en Ayala», en VVAA, La sociedad: teoría e investigación empírica. Librohomenaje a José Jiménez Blanco, Madrid, CIS.
- JULIÁ, S., (1997): «Francisco Ayala», Claves de la razón práctica, Julio/Agosto, n.° 74.
- PULIDO TIRADO, (1992): «La etapa crítico literaria de francisco Ayala en la Revista de Occidente (1927-1930)», en Sánchez Triguero y Chicharro Chamorro (eds.), Francisco Ayala. Teórico y crítico literario, Granada, Diputación Provincial de Granada.
- RICHMOND, C., (1978): «Prólogo» en Ayala, F., El jardín de las delicias. El tiempo y yo, Madrid, Espasa-Calpe.
- Richmond, C.,(1992): «Introducción» en Ayala, F., Los Usurpadores, Madrid, Cátedra, Pp: 9-96.
- SÁENZ, Paz, ed. (1988). Narratives from the Silver Age. Translated by Hughes, Victoria; Richmond, Carolyn. Madrid: Iberia. ISBN 84-87093-04-3.
- SÁNCHEZ TRIGUEROS, A., y CHICHARRO CHAMORRO, A., (eds.), (1992): Francisco Ayala. Teórico y crítico literario, Granada, Diputación Provincial de Granada.
- SOLDEVILA DURANTE, I., (ed.), (2001): Max Aub, Francisco Ayala: epistolario, 1952–1972, Valencia, Fundación Max Aub.
- VVAA, (1992): Anthropos, N.° 139, diciembre. Número monográfico dedicado a F. Ayala.
- VVAA, (2008): La Torre. Homenaje a Francisco Ayala. Puerto Rico, Universidad de Puerto Rico, 2008
- Antolín, Enriqueta Ayala sin olvidos Madrid, Espasa Calpe, 1993
- Bieder, Maryellen: Narrative Perspective in the Post-Civil War Novels of Francisco Ayala: Muertes de perro and El fondo del vaso. North Carolina, University of North Carolina, 1979
- Campo, Salustiano del (ed.)Francisco Ayala, sociólogo. Madrid, Instituto de España, 2007
- García Montero, Luis Francisco Ayala y el cine. Madrid, Visor, 2006
- García Montero, Luis Francisco Ayala. El escritor en su siglo. Granada, Diputación, 2009
- García Montero, Luis, y otros Francisco Ayala. El escritor en su siglo. Madrid, Sociedad Estatal de Conmemoraciones Culturales, 2006
- Juárez, Rafael, y Juan Vida (eds.)Retratos y autorretratos de Francisco Ayala. Sevilla, Fundación José Manuel Lara, 2006
- Navarro Durán, Rosa, y Á. García Galiano: Retrato de Francisco Ayala. Barcelona, Galaxia Gutenberg, 1996
