= Ram Sewak =

Ram Sewak may refer to one of the following people:

- Ram Sewak Chowdhary, Indian politician
- Ram Sewak Hazari (1936–2012), Indian politician
- Ram Sewak Paikra (born 1962), Indian politician
- Ram Sewak Sharma (born 1955), Indian bureaucrat
- Ram Sewak Yadav, Indian politician
