= Seva (given name) =

Seva is a given name. As an East Slavic masculine given name, it is a diminutive for Vsevolod or Sevastyan (Sebastian). Notable people with the name include:

- Seva Granik (born 1975), Uzbek-American New York City-based party promoter
- Seva Gunitsky (fl. early 21st century), Russian-American political scientist.
- Seva Novgorodsev (born 1940), BBC Russian Service presenter, famous in the Soviet Union
- Seva Rokobaro (born 1978), Fijian former international rugby union player
