= Monte Ceva =

Mountain in Italy

- Location within Italy

Highest point
- Elevation: 225 m (738 ft)
- Coordinates: 45°17′25″N 11°46′51″E

Geography
- Location: Veneto, Italy

Monte Ceva is a hill of the Veneto, Italy with a prominence of 196m/643ft. It has an elevation of 225 metres (738 ft).
