= Seva Sadan =

Seva Sadan can refer to:

- Sevasadanam, a 1938 Tamil film directed by K. Subramanyam
- Bazaar-e-Husn, a novel by Prem Chand, published in Hindi under the title Seva Sadan
- Seva Sadan, an Indian women's social and training institution founded by Ramabai Ranade
