= Carolyn Richmond =

American-born literary scholar (1938–2024)

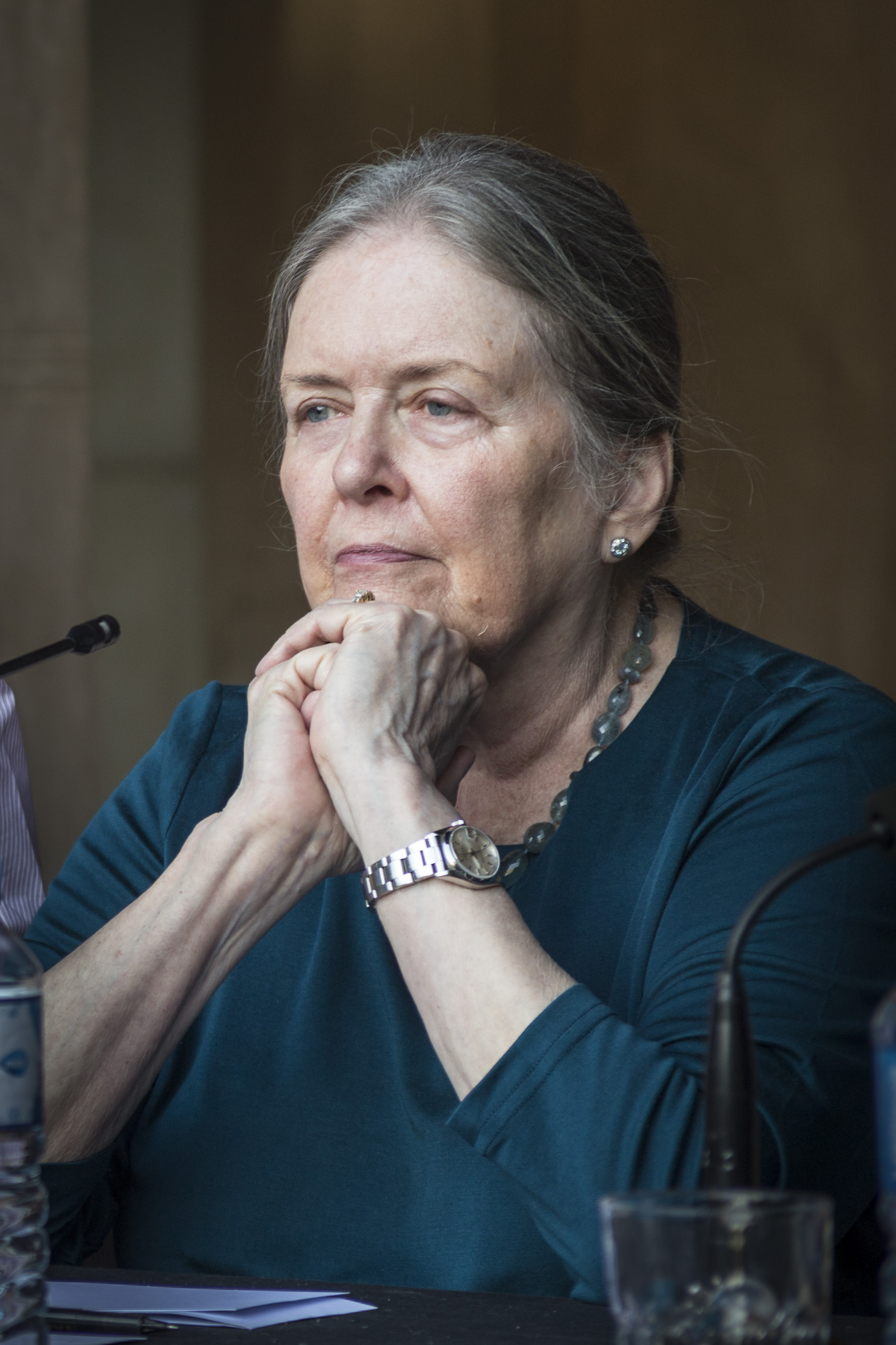
- Born: 1 March 1938
- Died: 26 June 2024 (aged 86)

Academic work
- Discipline: literary studies
- Sub-discipline: Spanish literature
- Main interests: Leopoldo Alas, Benito Pérez Galdós, Ramón Gómez de la Serna and Miguel Delibes

Carolyn Richmond (1 March 1938 – 26 June 2024) was an American-born literary scholar and translator.

After specializing in Spanish literature, she devoted herself to Leopoldo Alas, Benito Pérez Galdós, Ramón Gómez de la Serna and Miguel Delibes, among others.

Richmond was the second wife of Spanish literary scholar and novelist Francisco Ayala, whose works she also translated into English. She died in Madrid on 26 June 2024, at the age of 86.
