= Javier Gomá =

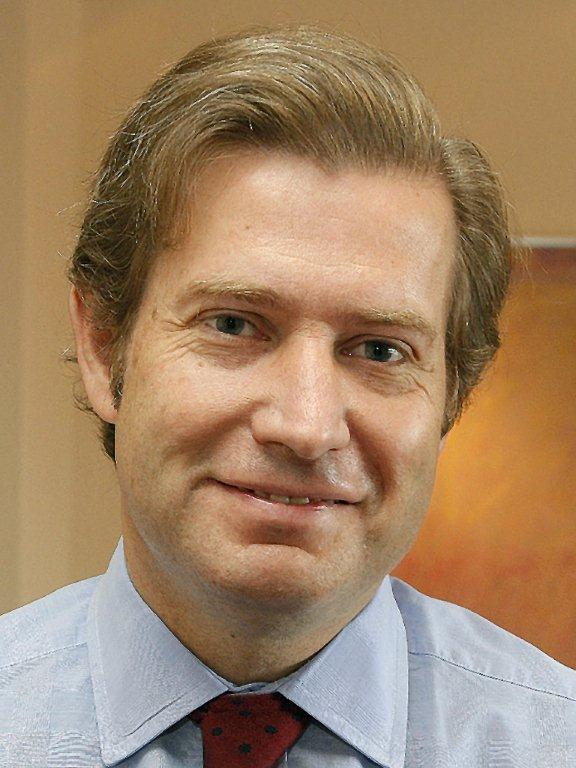
- Born: 24 May 1965; Bilbao, Basque Country, Spain
- Education: Complutense University of Madrid; National University of Distance Education
- Occupations: Philosopher; philologist; jurist; essayist
- Employer: Spanish Council of State (since 1993)
- Board member of: Juan March Foundation (since 1996)
- Spouse: Since 1994
- Children: 4
- Awards: Spanish National Literature Award for non-Fiction (2004), FIES Award (2001), Antonio Fontan Award (2012)

Javier Gomá Lanzón (Bilbao, 24 May 1965) is a Spanish philosopher, writer and essayist, author of the Tetralogía de la ejemplaridad (Tetralogy of exemplarity) and a theatrical trilogy. He is also the Executive Director of the Juan March Foundation and, since 2024, Director of the Chair of Exemplarity | CUNEF Universidad.

== Biography ==
He holds a degree in Classical Philology (1988), a degree in Law (1992) and a PhD in Philosophy.

In 1993 he passed the competitive examinations for the Spanish Council of State, from which he has been on leave of absence since 2007. In 1996 he began working at the Juan March Foundation (based in Madrid), of which he was appointed director in 2003, a position he currently holds.

His philosophical works are part of two collections: Tetralogía de la ejemplaridad (Tetralogy of exemplarity) and Filosofía mundana (Worldly philosophy). He is also the author of Ingenuidad aprendida (Learned naïveté) and La imagen de tu vida (The image of your life). Gomá has written a dramatic monologue, Inconsolable (Inconsolable), published in full in the Spanish newspaper El Mundo and performed by the Centro Dramático Nacional.

His first book, Imitación y experiencia (Imitation and experience), won the 2004 Spanish National Literature Award for non-Fiction. He has also received other awards (FIES Award, ABC Cultural & Ámbito Cultural, Antonio Fontán, Líder Humanista 2018, etc.)

Gomá is a member of the boards of the Teatro Real (Madrid's opera house) and the Teatro Abadía. In 2012 and 2014 the Spanish version of Foreign Policy included him in the list of the fifty most influential Ibero-American intellectuals. In addition to his writing awards, he has also given talks at many Spanich and foreign institutions, and has frequently worked with newspapers, cultural magazines and radio.

He is a member of the Advisory Board of Revista de Estudios Orteguianos. He is also a member of the Board of Directors of the Spanish Association of Foundations. In 2000, Gomá was also chosen as a participant in the International Visitor Program of the US Department of State/USIA, a professional exchange program.

He has written, among others, in the following newspapers, magazines and cultural supplements: El Mundo, La Vanguardia, Nueva Revista de Política, Cultura y Arte, El País, Babelia, El País Semanal, ABC, ABC Cultural, El Cultural, Claves de Razón Práctica, Revista de Libros, La Razón, Revista de Occidente, Metrópolis, El Noticiero de las Ideas and Turia.

== Family ==
His brothers Ignacio and Fernando Gomá Lanzón are both notaries in Madrid and co-publishers of the blog Hay Derecho? on legal and political current affairs.

== Non-fiction works ==
Javier Gomá's most important philosophical works have been published in two collections:

1.- Tetralogía de la ejemplaridad (Tetralogy of exemplarity) (Taurus, 2014), the result of a philosophical project developed over a decade and made up of the following works: Imitación y experiencia [Imitation and experience] (2003), Aquiles en el gineceo (Achilles in the gynaeceum) (2007), Ejemplaridad pública (Public exemplarity) (2009) y Necesario pero imposible (Necessary but impossible) (2013). The first two works were first published by Editorial Pre-Textos, and the second two by Taurus, which also published the tetralogy as a boxed set and in pocket book format.

2.- Filosofía mundana. Microensayos completos (Worldly philosophy: complete micro-essays) (Galaxia Gutenberg, 2016), which includes the 63 micro-essays that appeared in Spanish newspapers, principally El País, plus some from La Vanguardia. The essays, less six that appear only in the complete collection, had been previously published in two volumes, Todo a mil (Everything at a thousand) (2012) y en Razón: portería (Ask in reception) (2014).

After these two compilations, his next book was La imagen de tu vida (Your life's image) (2017), which brings together three essays on posthumous exemplarity - "Humana perduración" (Human purportuity), "La imagen de tu vida" (Your life's image) and "Cervantes. La imagen de su vida" (Cervantes. The image of his life) - and the dramatic monologue Inconsolable written after the death of his father.

Gomá has also published collections of his essays and talks in Ingenuidad aprendida (Learned naïveté) (2011) and Materiales para una estética (Material for an esthetics) (2013). He is, together with Carlos García Gual and Fernando Savater, co-author of Muchas felicidades (Much happiness) (2014).

Javier Gomá coordinated the collected volume Ganarse la vida en el arte, la literatura y la música (Making a living in art, literature and music) (Galaxia Gutenberg, 2012).

Based on his experience as head of a foundation, Gomá wrothe: Carta a las fundaciones españolas y otros ensayos del mismo estilo (Letters to Spanish foundations and other essays in the same vein) (2014).

Early in his career Gomá also wrote a number of philosophical essays of a programmatic nature, such as La tercera gran metáfora (The Third Great Metaphor) (1994), El sabor y el saber de la experiencia de la vida(The Taste an Knowledge of Life Experience) (1996), La idea más influyente del siglo (The Most Influential Idea of the Century) (1997), La majestad del símbolo (The Majesty of the Symbol) (2001), and, following publication of the first part of his tetralogy, Idola tribus: la destrucción del humanismo (Idola Tribus: The Destruction of Humanism) (2007).

== Theatrical works ==
After its publication in 2016 by the El Mundo newspaper, Gomá's dramatic monologue Inconsolable premiered on 28 June 2017 in the main hall of the María Guerrero Theatre in Madrid (of the Spanish National Drama Centre), directed by Ernesto Caballero de las Heras and performed by Fernando Cayo. The following year it was performed in Bilbao and Barcelona.

In May 2019, the publisher Pre-Textos published the comedy Quiero cansarme contigo, o el peligro de las buenas compañías (I want to get tired with you, or the danger of good company), which depicts a conflict with exemplarity in a humorous register. This work, together with Inconsolable and a third entitled Las lágrimas de Jerjes (Xerxe's tears), make up a theatrical trilogy entitled Un hombre de cincuenta años (A man of 50).
