= Historical journalism =

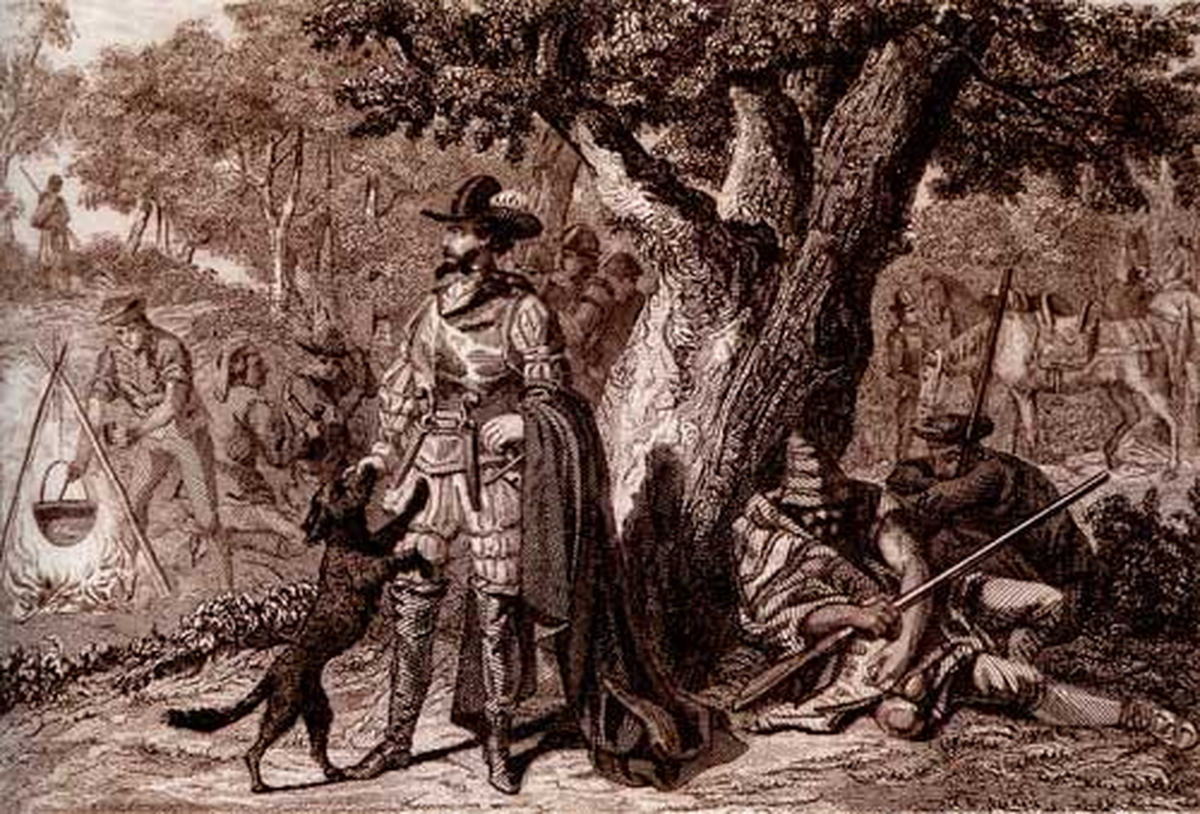
Perot Roca Guinarda as described by Cervantes

Historical journalism refers to the in-depth research and reporting of historical events, often uncovering new facts and providing fresh insights into significant occurrences from the past centuries. This branch of journalism combines techniques from both investigative journalism and historical research. It's important to mention that most of these journalists are not historians or they don't have a university degree in history. Historical journalism is not directly related to revisionism, as the majority of cases investigate unknown facts for the first time. However, according to the dictionary, some cases that start an investigation about perfectly known facts, can be considered as revisionist.

The second part of 'Don Quixote', an important chapter of world literature and a crucial piece of Cervantes' work, it is a typical case of historical journalism, as, few years after the facts, he narrates his meeting with Perot Rocaguinarda, a famous bandolier of his time, describing the facts in detail, even saying " he carried four pistols in his waist, which in that land are called pedreñales." This can be considered as an example of historical journalism because is based on oral sources and, there is a sufficient lapse of time between the events and the narration, the years elapsed between the first and second parts of 'Don Quixote'.

== Characteristics ==
Historical journalism plays a crucial role in uncovering the truths of the past, providing valuable insights, and informing the public. It requires a combination of journalistic skills and historical knowledge, making it a unique and important field within journalism.

Historical investigative journalism is characterized by:

- Thorough Research: Utilizing archives, primary sources, interviews, and other historical documents.
- Fact-Checking: Ensuring the accuracy of the information through cross-referencing multiple sources.
- Narrative Style: Presenting historical events in a compelling and engaging manner.

== History ==
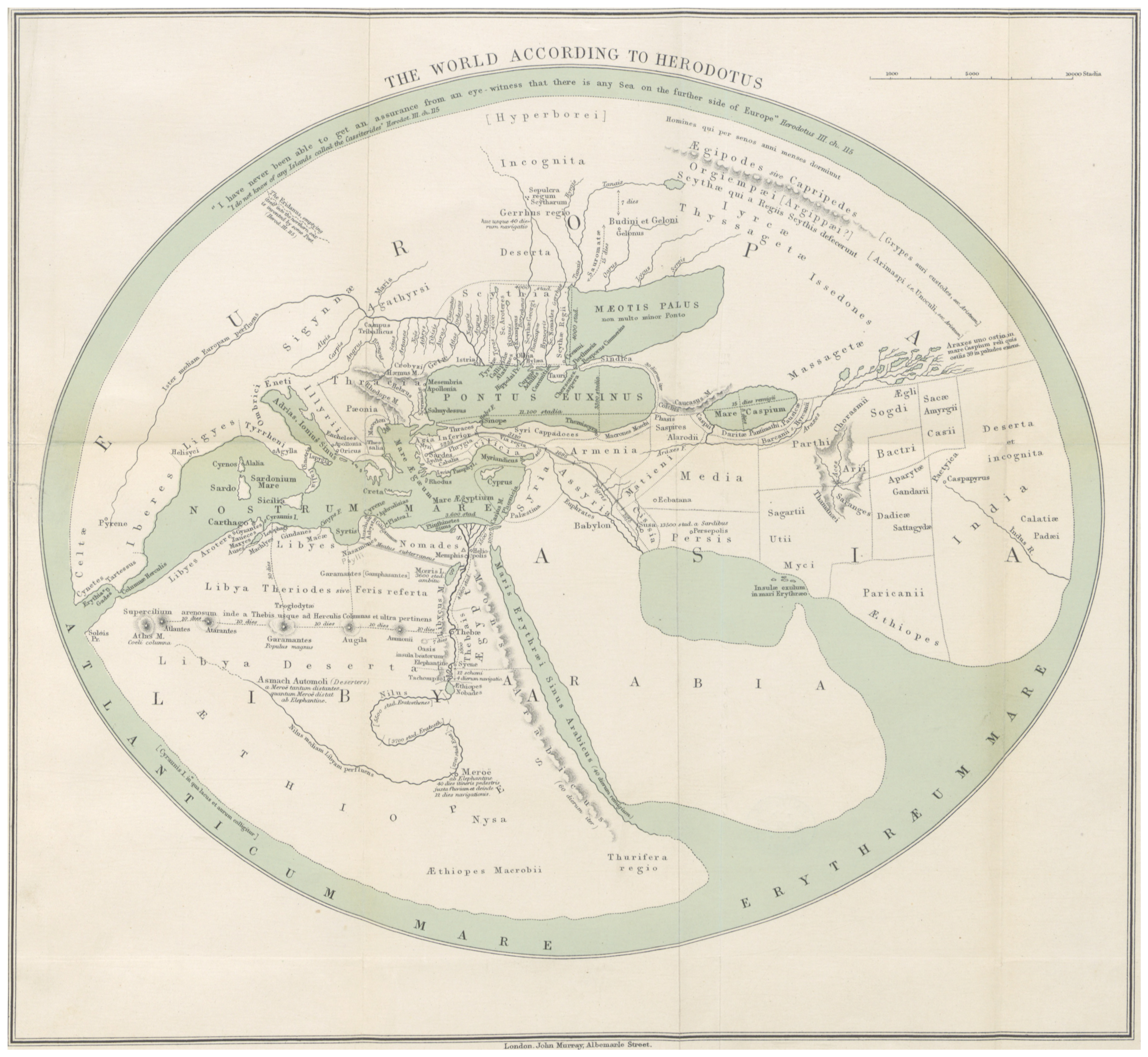
Reconstructed map of the world based on the writings of Herodotus

The practice of historical journalism has evolved over time, with journalists seeking to understand the context and implications of historical events. It became more prominent in the 20th century, with publications dedicated to uncovering the complexities of past events.

The father of History, the Greek Herodotus, whose travel book is described as “the first great reportage of universal literature.” It is an acknowledged that this book “is not a true history” because it only has oral sources, so that his interlocutors “have told Herodotus the facts not as they happened but as they think or would have liked them to happen.” Objective history does not exist, just as objective journalism does not exist, but both disciplines try to seek rigor.

A very significant example, of historical journalism, is the story of Matvey Kuzmin, an 83-year-old Russian peasant who sacrificed his life in 1942 to lead an entire German battalion into an ambush. His story went largely unnoticed until Pravda journalist Boris Polevoy wrote the article “El último día de Matvey Kuzmin.” As a result of this historical investigation and reporting, Kuzmin was posthumously recognized as a Hero of the Soviet Union, and his story was turned into a children's school tale.

In recent years, a group of journalists has been contributing to Wikipedia and several newspapers, documenting the Franco regime reprisals against pro-Republican people in Spain. Their work includes stories, and hundreds of reprisal cases. These contributions are crucial in shedding light on these dark periods of history and ensuring that the victims are remembered and honored.

== Methods ==
Journalists in this field use various methods, including:

- Archival Research: Accessing historical records, letters, and official documents.
- Oral Histories: Conducting interviews with individuals who have firsthand knowledge of historical events.
- Collaboration with Historians: Working alongside academic historians to ensure a comprehensive understanding of the context.

== Challenges and impact ==
Journalists in this field face several challenges, such as:

- Access to Information: Difficulty in obtaining primary sources or restricted documents.
- Verification of Facts: Ensuring the accuracy of historical accounts.
- Ethical Considerations: Balancing the need for public knowledge with respect for individuals involved.

The impact of .historical journalism is significant, as it:

- Reveals Hidden Truths: Bringing to light previously unknown or misunderstood aspects of history.
- Informs the Public: Educating the public about historical events and their relevance to contemporary issues.
- Influences Policy: Sometimes leading to changes in policy or public perception.

== Examples ==
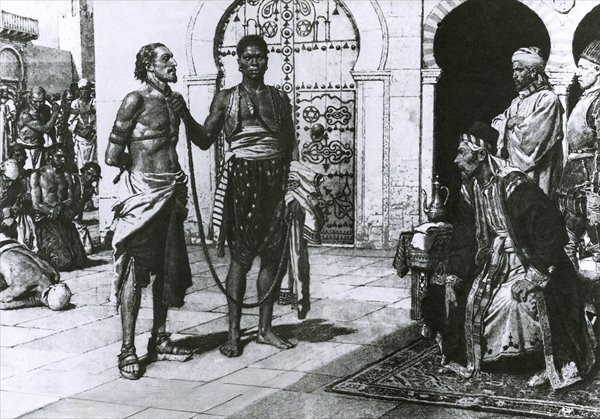
Cervantes brought before Hassan Pasha

Some of the works in historical journalism include:

- Cervantes in his theatrical play "El trato de Argel" narrates his imprisonment in Algiers by Hassan Pasha, returning from the Battle of Lepanto. Some years later, from his house in front of Barcelona harbor, he could watch the ships arriving at the city and has narrated, in the second part of 'Don Quixote', some events that were happening in it, for instance, the aprehension of a turkish ship in front of Montjuic. Both works became a part of the historical journalism of his time.
- "The Pentagon Papers" by Neil Sheehan and The New York Times, revealing the secret history of the Vietnam War.
- Identification and location of the Catalan Romaní populations in France, language, culture and migratory itineraries, by Eugeni Casanova which made known the existence of Catalan Romaní in France beyond Roussillon.
- The story of the "13 Roses", thirteen republican girls shot by Franco's army the 5th, August,1939, on the outer walls of the Almudena cemetery in Madrid, Spain, together with 43 men.
- The story of two republican women (mother and daughter) from Setcases, Catalonia, were forced to exile to the town of Valmanya, in northern Catalonia, and then deported by the occupying forces of the Wertmacht to the Ravensbrück Concentration Camp, where the mother died and the daughter was able to survive until liberation, but the town of Valmanya was completely destroyed and almost all its inhabitants murdered, in what is known as the Valmanya Massacre.

== Bibliography ==
- Walter Hömberg: Die Aktualität der Vergangenheit. Konturen des Geschichtsjournalismus. In: Universitas, 64. Jg. 2009, Nr. 761, S. 1141–1155.
- Klaus Arnold, Walter Hömberg und Susanne Kinnebrock (Hrsg.): Geschichtsjournalismus. Zwischen Information und Inszenierung. In: Kommunikationsgeschichte, Band 21. LIT Verlag, Berlin 2010.
