= Luis López Nieves =

Puerto Rican writer

- Born: January 17, 1950 (age 76); San Juan, Puerto Rico
- Occupations: Writer, Professor
- Spouse: Mara Daisy Cruz
- Writing career
- Genres: Novel, Short Story
- Notable works: Voltaire's Heart; Seva; The True Death of Juan Ponce de León
- Notable awards: National Literature Prize (Twice: in 2000 and in 2005)
- Website: ciudadseva.com

Luis López Nieves (born January 17, 1950) is a Puerto Rican author.

He has collaborated with several newspapers and written two TV miniseries. He has written the scripts for PSA advertisements. He has been visiting professor at the University of Massachusetts Boston and was a Ford Foundation Fellow.

== Education and career ==
López Nieves created and is the director of the first Master's Program in Creative Writing of Latin America, at the Universidad del Sagrado Corazón, in San Juan.

López Nieves studied at the University of Puerto Rico, Río Piedras Campus and was in a course taught by René Marqués, which he says changed his life, knowing then he wanted to write-not study law, as he had originally planned.

López Nieves has a BA in General Studies from the University of Puerto Rico; also an MA in Hispanic Literature and a Ph.D. in Comparative Literature, both from State University of New York at Stony Brook.

During two year he wrote his column Byzantine Letters (Cartas Bizantinas) in the largest newspaper of Puerto Rico, El Nuevo Día.

=== Ciudad Seva ===
On December 12, 1995, he founded Ciudad Seva, a website that has received more than 63 million visitors. The site was launched out of curiosity, as a way for López Nieves to keep in touch with his family and friends. He chose "Seva", the title of his first book, as the name of the site. The website features almost all publicly known information about the author and his writings.

Founded in April 2001, the Ciudad Seva Digital Library is a major attraction of the site. Begun as a way for the author to post useful stories for his students and courses, it now houses more than 3000 classic short stories. In addition to its digital library function, the site houses numerous literary Internet forums, including one for the peer review of writings and the exchange of ideas for improving each other's work. In addition, visitors can subscribe to a weekly classic short story via email.

=== Retirement ===
In August 2019 he retired from his job as professor after 30 years at the Universidad del Sagrado Corazón, where he had mentored many writers.

== Publications ==
His books The True Death of Juan Ponce de León (2000) and Voltaire's Heart (2005) have won the National Literature Prize. Additional books he has published include Seva and Writing for Rafa. His short stories have been published in Latin American and Spanish anthologies. In 2009 he published his latest novel, Galileo's Silence (El silencio de Galileo), simultaneously in Spain and in Latin America.

== Bibliography ==
=== Novels ===
- El corazón de Voltaire, 2005, Grupo Editorial Norma, Colombia. (Voltaire's Heart.)
- El corazón de Voltaire, 2007, Belacqva, Spain. (Voltaire's Heart.)
- El silencio de Galileo, La Otra Orilla (Grupo Editorial Norma), Bogotá, Colombia, junio 2009, pp. 338. (Galileo's Silence)
- El silencio de Galileo, Mosaico (Grupo Editorial Norma), Barcelona, España, julio 2009, pp. 333. (Galileo's Silence)

=== Short stories ===
- Seva (one of Puerto Rico's most celebrated short stories), 1984, Grupo Editorial Norma, Colombia.
- Escribir para Rafa, 1987, Grupo Editorial Norma, Colombia. (Writing for Rafa.)
- La verdadera muerte de Juan Ponce de León, 2000, Grupo Editorial Norma, Colombia. (The True Death of Juan Ponce de León.)

=== Short story anthologies ===
- El cuento hispanoamericano (Seymour Menton, Fondo de Cultura Económica, México, Seventh Edition, 2003).
- El cuento hispanoamericano en el siglo XX (Fernando Burgos, Editorial Castalia, Madrid, 1997).
- El muro y la intemperie: El nuevo cuento latinoamericano (Julio Ortega, Ediciones del Norte, New Hampshire, USA, 1989).
- Cuentos para ahuyentar el turismo (Vitalina Alfonso y Emilio Jorge Rodríguez, Editorial Arte y Literatura, La Habana, Cuba, 1991).
- Writing Between the Lines (Bowen & Weigel, University of Massachusetts Press, Amherst, MA, USA, 1997).
- Die Horen (Wilfried Böhringer, Germany, Year 42, 3rd Quarter, Edition 187, 1997).
- Los nuevos caníbales: Antología de la más reciente cuentística del caribe hispano (Bobes, Valdez y Gómez Beras, Editorial Isla Negra -joint publishing with Ediciones Unión/Cuba and Editorial Búho/Dominican Republic-, San Juan, Puerto Rico, 2000).

== See also ==
- List of Puerto Ricans
- List of Puerto Rican writers
- Puerto Rican literature
