= Sevag =

Sevag (Armenian: Սեւակ, pronounced [sɛvɑɡ]) is a popular masculine given name used in Armenian. It means "black eye" and is a compound word formed by the lexemes "sev" (meaning black) and "ag" (meaning eye). In the Eastern Armenian language, it is pronounced "Sevak".

Notable people with the name include:

- Paruyr Sevak (1924–1971), Armenian poet, translator and literary critic
- Ruben Sevak (1886–1915), Ottoman Armenian poet, prose-writer, and doctor
- Sevak Amroyan (born 1990), Armenian singer
- Sevag Balıkçı (1986–2011), Turkish soldier of Armenian descent who was shot to death during compulsory military service
- Sevak Khanagyan (born 1987), Russian-Armenian singer and songwriter
- Krikor Sevag Mekhitarian (born 1986), Armenian-Brazilian chess grandmaster and chess streamer

== See also ==
- Paruyr Sevak, Armenia
