= Sivak (surname) =

Sivak is a Slavic-language surname derived from the nickname that refers to a man with gray hair, from the Slavic word sivy, gray, gray-haired.

Notable people with the surname include:

- Jozef Sivák (1886–1959), Slovak politician
- Martín Sivak (born 1975), Argentine journalist and author
- Nancy Sivak, Canadian actress
- Peter Sivák (born 1982), Slovak ice hockey player
- Václav Sivák (born 1999), Czech kickboxer
