= Seva (short story) =

Short story written by Puerto Rican author Luis López Nieves

"Seva: A History of the First American Invasion of the Island of Puerto Rico in May 1898" is a short story written by Puerto Rican author Luis López Nieves. First published in the newspaper Claridad on December 23, 1983, the story gives a fictionalized account of the 1898 U.S. invasion of Puerto Rico.

== Plot ==
"Seva" tells the story of Dr. Victor Cabañas, a contemporary historian who uncovers evidence of the destruction of the town of Seva by American forces during the Spanish–American War. Cabañas learns that, before the July landings of U.S. troops at Guánica, General Nelson A. Miles had attempted to invade Seva, on Puerto Rico's east coast. The residents of Seva fought back, causing heavy casualties among the Americans and prompting General Miles, ashamed and enraged, to bomb the town continuously for three months. After his troops' successful Guánica-based invasion, Miles ordered Seva's remaining residents killed, the city's ruins paved over with Roosevelt Roads Naval Station, and the area's name changed to Ceiba. Only one person, a boy named Ignacio Martínez, survived the slaughter. Cabañas collects evidence of these events, including a taped interview with Martínez, now an adult. The story, narrated by López Nieves himself, is framed as an exposé of Cabañas's findings.

== Makeup ==
López Nieves mixed fact and fiction throughout the story. The town of Seva and the main character, Dr. Victor Cabañas, are both entirely fictional. General Nelson Miles was the leader of U.S. forces during the invasion, but the invasion began in June from the south, not in May from the east. Upon its publication, readers who mistook the story for truth demanded that the government investigate the events and that Dr. Cabañas be located. The newspaper Claridad had to issue press releases confirming that the story was fictional.
